= Vijayakanth filmography =

Filmography of India actor Vijayakanth captain

The following is the filmography of Vijayakanth (1952–2023), an Indian actor, film producer, philanthropist and politician.

== Filmography ==
=== Film actor ===
Year	Film	Role	Notes	Ref(s)
1979	Inikkum Ilamai	Arun		
1979	Agal Vilakku	Dhanushkodi		
1980	Neerottam	Kumar	credited as A. Vijayakanth	
1980	Samanthipoo	Prakash		
1980	Doorathu Idi Muzhakkam	Ponnan		
1981	Sattam Oru Iruttarai	Vijay		
1981	Sivappu Malli	Ranga		
1981	Nenjile Thunivirunthal	Muthu		
1981	Jadhikkoru Needhi	Kaantha		
1981	Noolaruntha Pattam	Udhaya		
1981	Needhi Pizhaithathu	Vijay		
1982	Parvaiyin Marupakkam	Vijay		
1982	Pattanathu Rajakkal	Vijay		
1982	Autoraja	Raja		
1982	Sivantha Kangal	Inspector Vijay		
1982	Om Shakti	Kathavarayan		
1982	Sattam Sirikkiradhu	Subash		
1983	Naan Soottiya Malar	Ashok		
1983	Dowry Kalyanam	Ethiraj		
1983	Saatchi	Inspector Vijay		
1984	Madurai Sooran	Sooran		
1984	Madras Vathiyar	Marasamy		
1984	Theerppu En Kaiyil	Madhan		
1984	Vetri	Vijay (Vetri)		
1984	Nooravathu Naal	Raj		
1984	Vengaiyin Mainthan	Pambatti		
1984	Kuzhandhai Yesu	Jeeva		
1984	Vellai Pura Ondru	Jeeva		
1984	Nalla Naal	Chinna Durai (Muthu)		
1984	Maman Machan	Mahesh		
1984	Veetuku Oru Kannagi	Vijay		
1984	Sabaash	Vijay		
1984	Naalai Unathu Naal	Arun		
1984	Sathiyam Neeye	Soori		
1984	Idhu Enga Boomi	Vijay		
1984	Vaidhegi Kaathirunthaal	Vellaichamy	Nominated, Filmfare Award for Best Actor – Tamil	
1984	Kudumbam	Vijay		
1984	January 1	Inspector Mano		
1985	Alai Osai	Muthu		
1985	Santhosha Kanavukal	Pandian		
1985	Pudhu Yugam	Vijay		
1985	Navagraha Nayagi	Narayana		
1985	Raman Sreeraman	Vijay, Sanjay	Dual role	
1985	Puthiya Sagaptham	Vijay		
1985	Annai Bhoomi	Raja		
1985	Naane Raja Naane Mandhiri	Rangamani		
1985	Thandanai	Kumar		
1985	Amudha Gaanam	Sundaram		
1985	Engal Kural	Himself	Guest appearance	
1985	Eetti	Velan		
1985	Neethiyin Marupakkam	Inspector Vijayakumar		
1985	Puthiya Theerpu	Inspector Raja		
1985	Yemaatrathe Yemaaraathe	Suryaprakash		
1986	Karimedu Karuvayan	Karuvayan		
1986	Manakanakku	Ramanu		
1986	Amman Kovil Kizhakale	Chinnamani	Filmfare Award for Best Actor – Tamil; Cinema Express Award for Best Actor – Tamil	
1986	Nambinar Keduvadhillai	Murali		
1986	Enakku Nane Needipathi	Vijay		
1986	Vasantha Raagam	Vijay		
1986	Oomai Vizhigal	DSP Dheenadayalan		
1986	Annai En Dheivam	Vijay		
1986	Thazhuvatha Kaigal	Gopal		
1986	Dharma Devathai	Vijay		
1986	Oru Iniya Udhayam	Sakhtivel		
1987	Sirai Paravai	DCP Rajasekharan		
1987	Solvadhellam Unmai	Vijay		
1987	Poo Mazhai Pozhiyuthu	Pandian		
1987	Velundu Vinaiyillai	Vetri		
1987	Veerapandiyan	Manimaran		
1987	Veeran Veluthambi	Inspector Rahman		
1987	Cooliekkaran	Raja		
1987	Ninaive Oru Sangeetham	Marudhu		
1987	Manathil Uruthi Vendum	Himself	Guest appearance for song "Vangala Kadale"	
1987	Sattam Oru Vilayaattu	Vijay		
1987	Uzhavan Magan	Chinna Durai, Siva	Dual role	
1988	Kaalaiyum Neeye Maalaiyum Neeye	Raja, Inspector Vishwanath	Dual role	
1988	Makkal Aanaiyittal	Kathiravan		
1988	Ullathil Nalla Ullam	Michael Raj		
1988	Therkathi Kallan	Kallan		
1988	Poonthotta Kaavalkaaran	Anthony	Cinema Express Awards for Best Character Actor; Nominated, Filmfare Award for Best Actor – Tamil	
1988	Thambi Thanga Kambi	Shankar		
1988	Nallavan	Gurumoorthy, Rajasekhar	Dual role	
1988	Senthoora Poove	Captain Soundarapandiyan	Tamil Nadu State Film Award for Best Actor; Cinema Express Awards for Best Character Actor	
1988	Thenpandi Seemayile	Vijay		
1988	Uzhaithu Vaazha Vendum	Raja		
1989	En Purushanthaan Enakku Mattumthaan	Marudhu		
1989	Paattukku Oru Thalaivan	Arivu		
1989	Poruthathu Pothum	Nallarasu (Vallarasu), Ponnuthangam	Dual role	
1989	Ponmana Selvan	Raja		
1989	Dharmam Vellum	Inspector K. Jaganath, Vijay	Dual role	
1989	Rajanadai	Inspector Vijayakanth		
1989	Meenakshi Thiruvilayadal	Shiva / Lord Sundareswar		
1990	Pulan Visaranai	DCP 'Honest' Raj	Nominated, Filmfare Award for Best Actor – Tamil	
1990	Pudhu Padagan	Manikkam		
1990	Sandhana Kaatru	Azhagiri		
1990	Sirayil Pootha Chinna Malar	Muthappa, Parthiban	Dual role	
1990	Engitta Mothathay	Pandiyan		
1990	Chatriyan	ACP Panneer Selvam		
1991	Iravu Sooriyan	Himself	Special appearance	
1991	Captain Prabhakaran	DFO Prabhakaran IFS		
1991	Maanagara Kaaval	ACP Subash IPS		
1991	Moondrezhuthil En Moochirukkum	Robert		
1992	Chinna Gounder	Thavasi (Chinna Gounder)	Nominated, Filmfare Award for Best Actor – Tamil	
1992	Bharathan	Bharathan		
1992	Thai Mozhi	Inspector Alex	Special appearance	
1992	Kaviya Thalaivan	Manikkam		
1993	Kovil Kaalai	Uppiliyappan		
1993	Ezhai Jaathi	Subhash Chandra Bose		
1993	Sakkarai Devan	Sakkarai Devan		
1993	Rajadurai	SP Rajadurai, Vijay	Dual role	
1993	Enga Muthalali	Vijaya Ragunadhan Reddy		
1993	Senthoorapandi	Senthoorapandi	Extended Cameo Appearance	
1994	Sethupathi IPS	DCP Sethupathi		
1994	Honest Raj	ASP Raj	Nominated, Filmfare Award for Best Actor – Tamil	
1994	Pathavi Pramanam	Siva		
1994	En Aasai Machan	Aruchami		
1994	Periya Marudhu	Periya Marudhu		
1995	Karuppu Nila	Shanmuga Pandian		
1995	Thirumoorthy	Moorthy		
1995	Gandhi Pirantha Mann	Balu, Gandhi	Dual role	
1996	Thayagam	Sakthivel	Tamil Nadu State Film Award Special Prize; Nominated, Filmfare Award for Best Actor – Tamil	
1996	Tamizh Selvan	Thamizhselvan IAS		
1996	Alexander	Alexander IPS		
1997	Dharma Chakkaram	Chakkaravarthy		
1998	Ulavuthurai	Commodore Vasanth Periyasamy		
1998	Dharma	Dharma		
1998	Veeram Vilanja Mannu	Duraipandi, DSP Vijay	Dual role	
1999	Kallazhagar	Kamalakannan, Kamaaluddin	Dual role	
1999	Perianna	Lingam (Periyanna)	Extended Cameo Appearance	
1999	Kannupada Poguthaiya	Vetrivel, Vasudevarayar	Dual role	
2000	Vaanathai Pola	Vellaichamy, Muthu	Dual role	
2000	Vallarasu	DCP Vallarasu		
2000	Simmasanam	Sathyamurthy, Sakthivel, Thangarasu	Triple role	
2001	Vaanchinathan	DCP Vaanchinathan		
2001	Narasimha	Captain Narasimha		
2001	Viswanathan Ramamoorthy	Himself	Cameo appearance	
2001	Thavasi	Thavasi, Boopathi	Dual role	
2002	Raajjiyam	Karthikeyaan		
2002	Devan	Rathnavelu IPS	Extended Cameo Appearance	
2002	Ramanaa	Ramanaa		
2003	Chokka Thangam	Muthu		
2003	Thennavan	Thennavan IAS		
2004	Engal Anna	Sundaralingam Prabhakaran (SP)		
2004	Gajendra	Gajendra		
2004	Neranja Manasu	Ayyanar		
2005	Maayavi	Himself	Special appearance	
2006	Sudesi	Sudesi		
2006	Perarasu	Ilavarasu Pandiyan (Kasi Vasudevan IPS), Perarasu Pandiyan	Dual role	
2006	Dharmapuri	Sivaraman		
2007	Sabari	Sabarivasan		
2008	Arasangam	Arivarasu IPS		
2009	Mariyadhai	Annamalai, Raja	Dual role	
2009	Engal Aasaan	Mahendran		
2010	Virudhagiri	Virudhagiri IPS	Also Director	
2015	Sagaptham	Deiveegam	Cameo appearance	
2024	The Greatest of All Time	Nuclear Scientist "Captain" (Gandhi in disguise)	Posthumous film release AI Generated Cameo appearance	
2025	Padai Thalaivan	Professor Ramanaa (Final film role)	Posthumous film release AI Generated Cameo appearance	

=== Film producer ===
Vijayakanth with his brother-in-law L. K. Sudheesh has produced films under the company Captain Cine Creations.

- Vallarasu (2000)
- Narasimha (2001)
- Thennavan (2003)
- Engal Anna (2004)
- Sudesi (2006)
- Arasangam (2008)
- Viruthagiri (2010)
- Sagaptham (2015)

=== Film director ===
- Viruthagiri (2010)
