= V. V. Creations =

Indian motion picture company

- Type: Film production
- Industry: Motion pictures
- Founded: 1984
- Headquarters: Tamil Nadu, India
- Key people: Shoba Chandrasekhar; S. A. Chandrasekhar; Vijay

V. V. Creations is a Tamil film production company owned by S. A. Chandrasekhar's wife Shoba Chandrasekhar.

== History ==
V.V Creations is named after their children Vijay and his late sister Vidhya. V. V. Creations ventured into film production in 1984 with Veettuku Oru Kannagi directed by S. A. Chandrasekhar starring Vijayakanth and Saritha. The production company then produced five more Vijayakanth starrer films and directed by S. A. Chandrasekhar. In 1991, they produced Nanbargal directed by Shoba Chandrasekhar who made her directorial debut. The film completed a 200-day run at the box-office. Following the success of Nanbargal, they produced Shoba Chandrasekhar's Innisai Mazhai. In the end of 1992, S. A. Chandrasekhar and Shoba Chandrasekhar launched their son Vijay in Naalaiya Theerpu. They then produced Nenjinile and Pandhayam.

== Filmography ==
Year	Title	Director	Cast	Notes
1984	Veetuku Oru Kannagi	S. A. Chandrasekhar	Vijayakanth, Saritha	
1985	Pudhu Yugam	S. A. Chandrasekhar	Vijayakanth, Sivakumar, Suresh	
1985	Neethiyin Marupakkam	S. A. Chandrasekhar	Vijayakanth, Radhika	
1986	Vasantha Raagam	S. A. Chandrasekhar	Vijayakanth, Sudha Chandran, Rahman	
1987	Sattam Oru Vilayaattu	S. A. Chandrasekhar	Vijayakanth, Radha	
1989	Rajanadai	S. A. Chandrasekhar	Vijayakanth, Seetha, Gautami, Suresh	
1991	Nanbargal	Shoba Chandrasekhar	Neeraj, Mamta Kulkarni	
1992	Innisai Mazhai	Shoba Chandrasekhar	Neeraj, Parveen	
1992	Naalaiya Theerpu	S. A. Chandrasekhar	Vijay, Keerthana	
1999	Nenjinile	S. A. Chandrasekhar	Vijay, Isha Koppikar	
2006	Aathi	Ramana	Vijay, Trisha	
2008	Pandhayam	S. A. Chandrasekhar	Nithin Sathya, Sindhu Tolani	
