= Chaplin Balu =

Indian comedian and actor

- Occupation: Actor
- Years active: 1992–present

Chaplin Balu is an Indian actor and comedian who predominantly featured in comedy roles in Tamil cinema. He had acted in over 150 films in his acting career.

== Career ==
During his acting career, he frequently collaborated with lead actor Vijay in most of the latter's earlier films, often appearing as a friend of him in a supporting character role. His prominent collaborations with Vijay include Naalaiya Theerpu (1992), Senthoorapandi (1993), Deva (1995), Coimbatore Mappillai (1996), Vasantha Vaasal (1996), Maanbumigu Maanavan (1996), Once More (1997). At the shooting set of Maanbumigu Maanavan (1996), Vijay engaged in a heated exchange with his own father S. A. Chandrasekhar where Vijay asked for the rationale behind slapping Chaplin Balu for a careless mistake committed by an assistant director in the shooting spot, which Chandrasekhar mistook and misunderstood as he thought the mistake was due to Chaplin Balu's fault.

He also collaborated in comedy sequences along with veteran actor Vivek in several of his films including Pennin Manathai Thottu (2000), Budget Padmanabhan (2000), Shahjahan (2001), Saamy (2003), Dhool (2003). In Prabhu Deva starrer, Pennin Manathai Thottu (2000), he alongside Vivek and Mayilsamy acted in a film sequence which was shot and set within a single take. He also reportedly gave an hint to Vivek to apply dirty particles and black stain around his body in order to capture and grab the attention of audience for the comedy track sequence in Vijay starrer Shahjahan (2001), which also involved veteran actress Kovai Sarala where the latter played the role of a beggar woman.

However, his career took a backseat when veteran actor Vadivelu often interfered and took away the acting opportunities of him and other character artists. Initially, he was signed to play a role in Poonthottam (1998) and shoot for the film for ten days but Vadivelu intervened and he was subsequently removed from the film. Vadivelu apparently did not let other supporting comedy actors to shine and peak using their own mannerisms and Chaplin Balu was one of the casualties of Vadivelu's antics according to sources.

== Filmography ==
- Naalaiya Theerpu (1992)
- Senthoorapandi (1993)
- Sathyavan (1994)
- Deva (1995)
- Muthu (1995) (uncredited)
- Coimbatore Mappillai (1996)
- Vasantha Vaasal (1996)
- Maanbumigu Maanavan (1996)
- Kadhal Desam (1996)
- Once More (1997)
- Vasuke (1997)
- Kizhakkum Merkkum (1998)
- Tholi Prema (1998; Telugu)
- Thullatha Manamum Thullum (1999)
- Anantha Poongatre (1999)
- Sundari Neeyum Sundaran Naanum (1999)
- Nenjinile (1999)
- Minsara Kanna (1999)
- Paattali (1999)
- Nilave Mugam Kaattu (1999)
- Ninaivirukkum Varai (1999)
- Sudhandhiram (2000)
- Pennin Manathai Thottu (2000)
- Appu (2000)
- Kann Thirandhu Paaramma (2000)
- Budget Padmanabhan (2000)
- Ilaiyavan (2000)
- Uyirile Kalanthathu (2000)
- Manasu (2000)
- Chocklet (2001)
- Shahjahan (2001)
- Love Marriage (2001)
- Piriyadha Varam Vendum (2001)
- Poove Pen Poove (2001)
- Mitta Miraasu (2001)
- Raja (2002)
- H2O (2002; Kannada) (uncredited)
- Pesadha Kannum Pesume (2002)
- Gemini (2002)
- Style (2002)
- Dhool (2003)
- Vaseegara (2003) (uncredited)
- Pallavan (2003)
- Anjaneya (2003)
- Inidhu Inidhu Kadhal Inidhu (2003)
- Saamy (2003)
- Manasellam (2003)
- Sindhamal Sitharamal (2003)
- Ghilli (2004)
- Maanasthan (2004)
- Loves (2004)
- Arivumani (2004)
- En Purushan Ethir Veetu Ponnu (2004)
- Englishkaran (2005)
- Sivakasi (2005)
- Vanakkam Thalaiva (2005)
- En Uyirinum Melana (2007)
- Sutta Pazham (2008)
- Kuruvi (2008)
- Iyakkam (2008)
- Unnai Kann Theduthe (2009)
- Sattapadi Kutram (2011)
- Poova Thalaiya (2011)
- Osthe (2011)
- Onbadhule Guru (2013)
- Enbathettu (2017)
- Junga (2018)
- Azhagai Pookuthe (2023)
- Vizhithelu (2023)
- Pagalariyaan (2024)
- 2K Heart (2025)
