= Thangachimadam =

Coordinates: 9.2847°N 79.2511°E

- Village
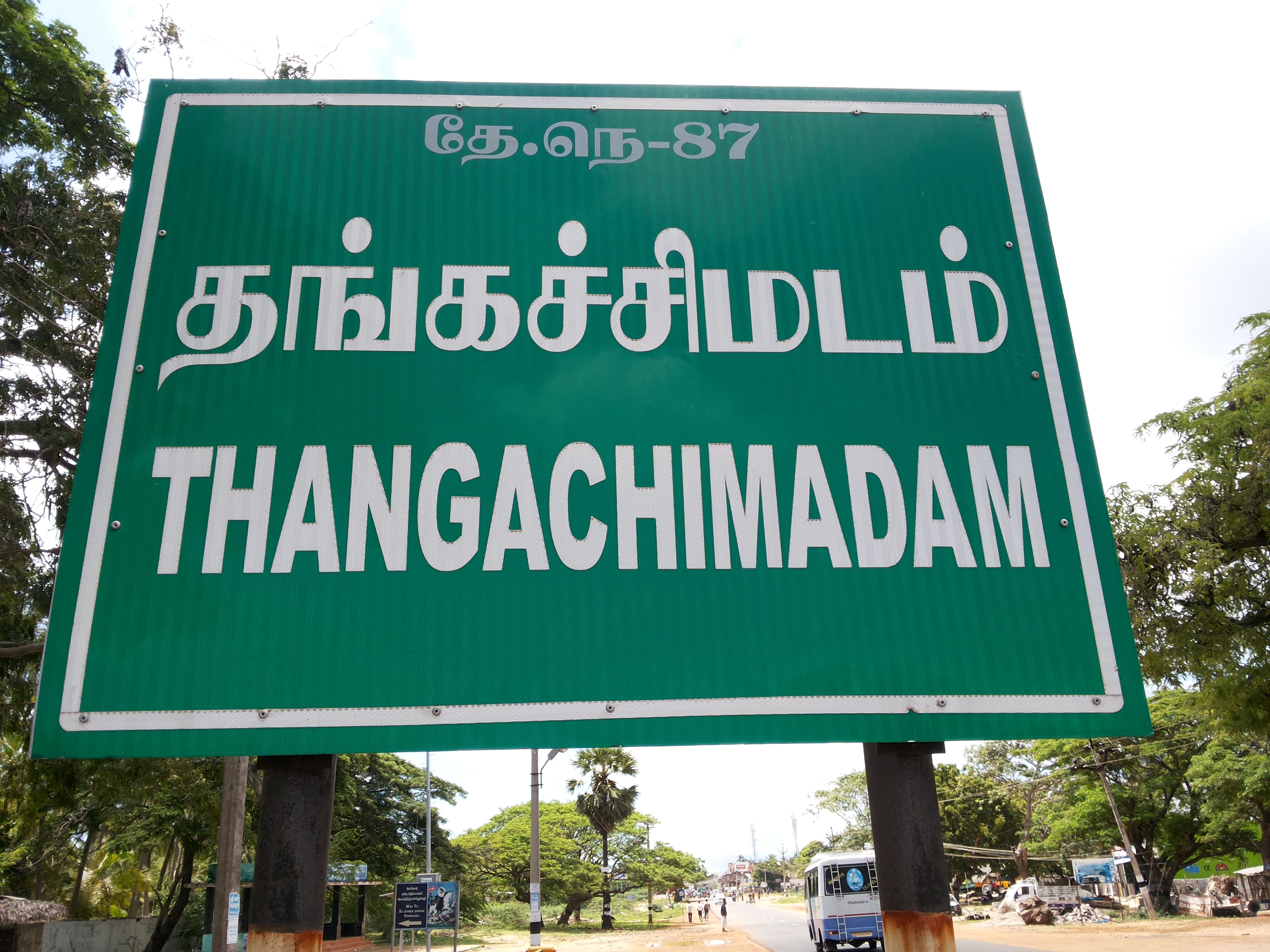
- Thangachimadam Name Board
- Interactive map of Thangachimadam
- Country: India
- State: Tamil Nadu
- District: Ramanathapuram

Languages
  - Official: Tamil
- Time zone: UTC+5:30 (IST)
- PIN: 623529
- Telephone code: 04573
- Vehicle registration: TN 65
- Nearest city: Rameswaram
- Lok Sabha constituency: Ramanathapuram
- Vidhan Sabha constituency: Ramanathapuram
- Patron Saint: St. James the Great

Thangachimadam is a village in Rameswaram island in the state of Tamil Nadu in India.

== Geography ==
Rameshwaram is separated from the mainland by Pamban channel.

== Economy ==
The main occupation of people live here is fishing and its allied occupations. As Thangachimadam is located in the middle of the Rameswaram island it has sea access on both sides North and Side. This advantage facilitates the fishing for the entire year.

Also coconut and jasmine farming activities exist at a considerable level. Jasmine nurseries abound in this coastal hamlet although fishing is the predominant activity. Around 300 farmers cultivate the exotic jasmine variety that is known for its unique fragrance. Small nurseries cover at least 150 acres in the village. Jasmine is almost synonymous with the temple city of Madurai, but the famed Madurai malli has its origins in this little known village of Thangachimadam on Rameswaram island.

== Climate ==
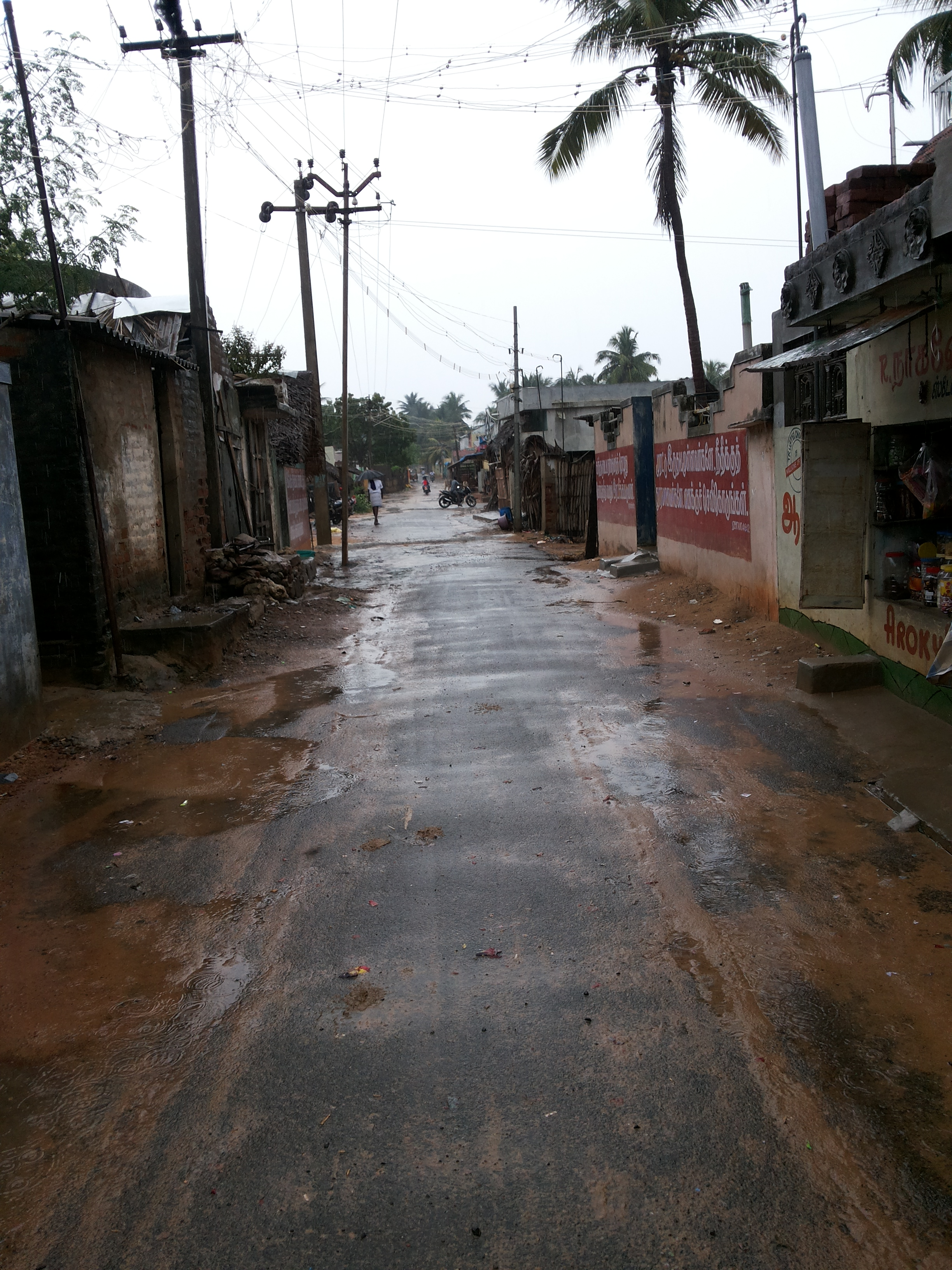
Raining at MGR Nagar Thangachimadam

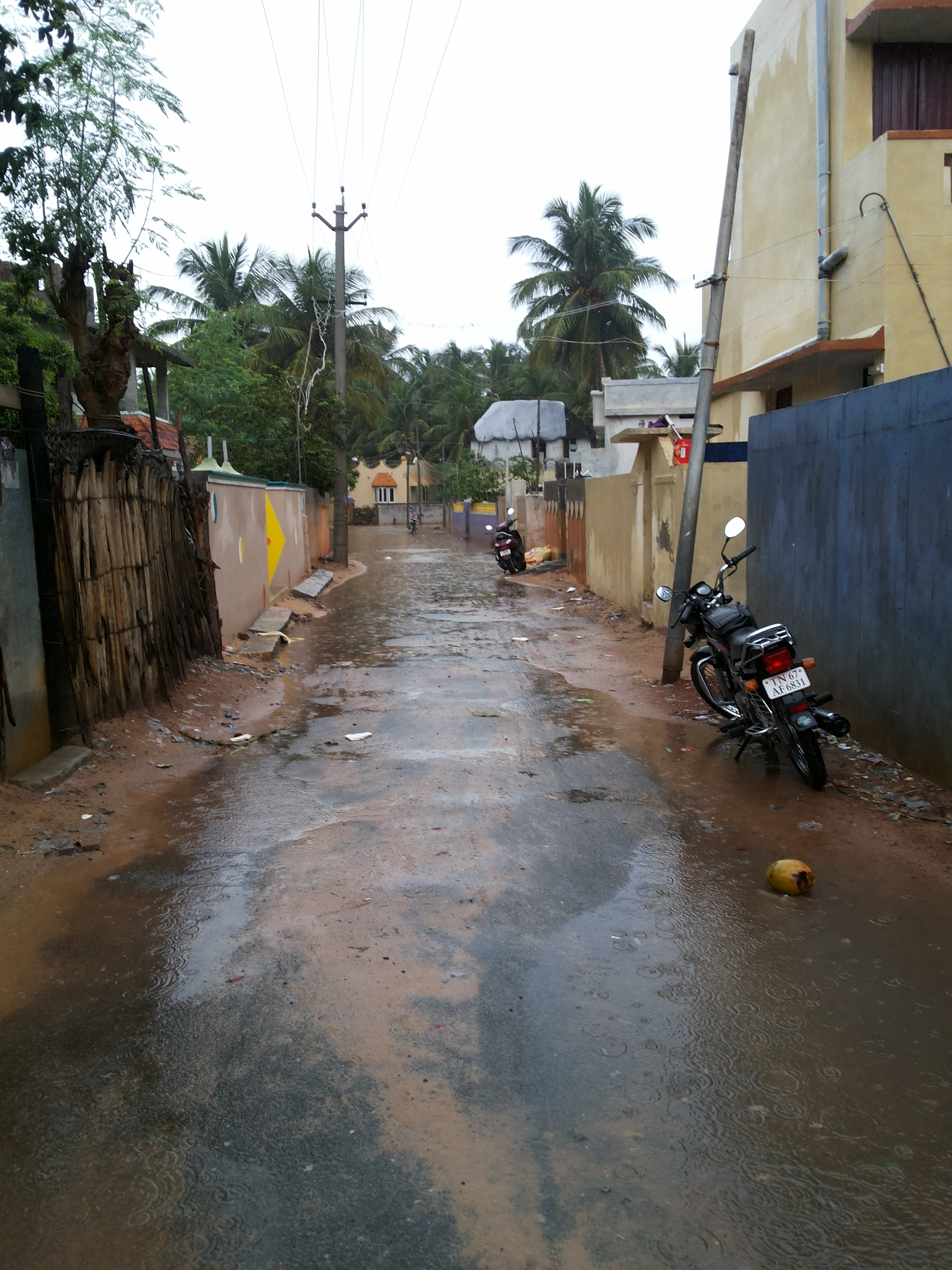
Water flowing after rain MGR Nagar

Thangachimadam has a hot tropical climate temperature ranging from 25 °C (min) to 46 °C (max) and the relative humidity is high at 79% on an average and it ranges between 80% and 90%.

Winter: Max. 30 °C Min. 25 °C, rainfall: 500 mm

== Communication ==
Under the joint ISRO-MSSRF Village Resource Centre programme- ISRO has sanctioned satellite connectivity to Thiruvaiyaru in Tanjore, Sembatty in Dindigul district and Thangachimadam in Ramnad district. These centers will facilitate teleconferences between farm and fishing families at these locations and MSSRF scientists as well as with leading experts in the area of health, education, agriculture, fisheries, marketing and disaster management.

== Education ==
- Govt Higher Secondary School.
- Mandapam Union Primary School
- Vivekanda Vidyalaya Matriculation School.
- St. Theresa primary school.
- Holy Cross girls higher secondary school.

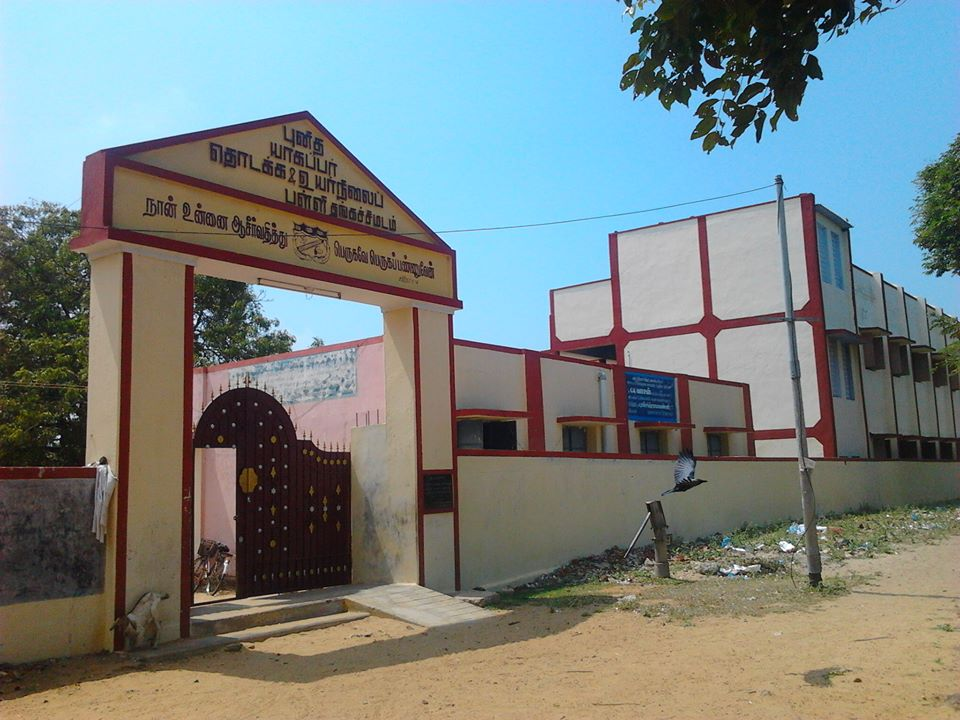
Punitha Yagappa High School

- Punitha Yagappar Higher Secondary School

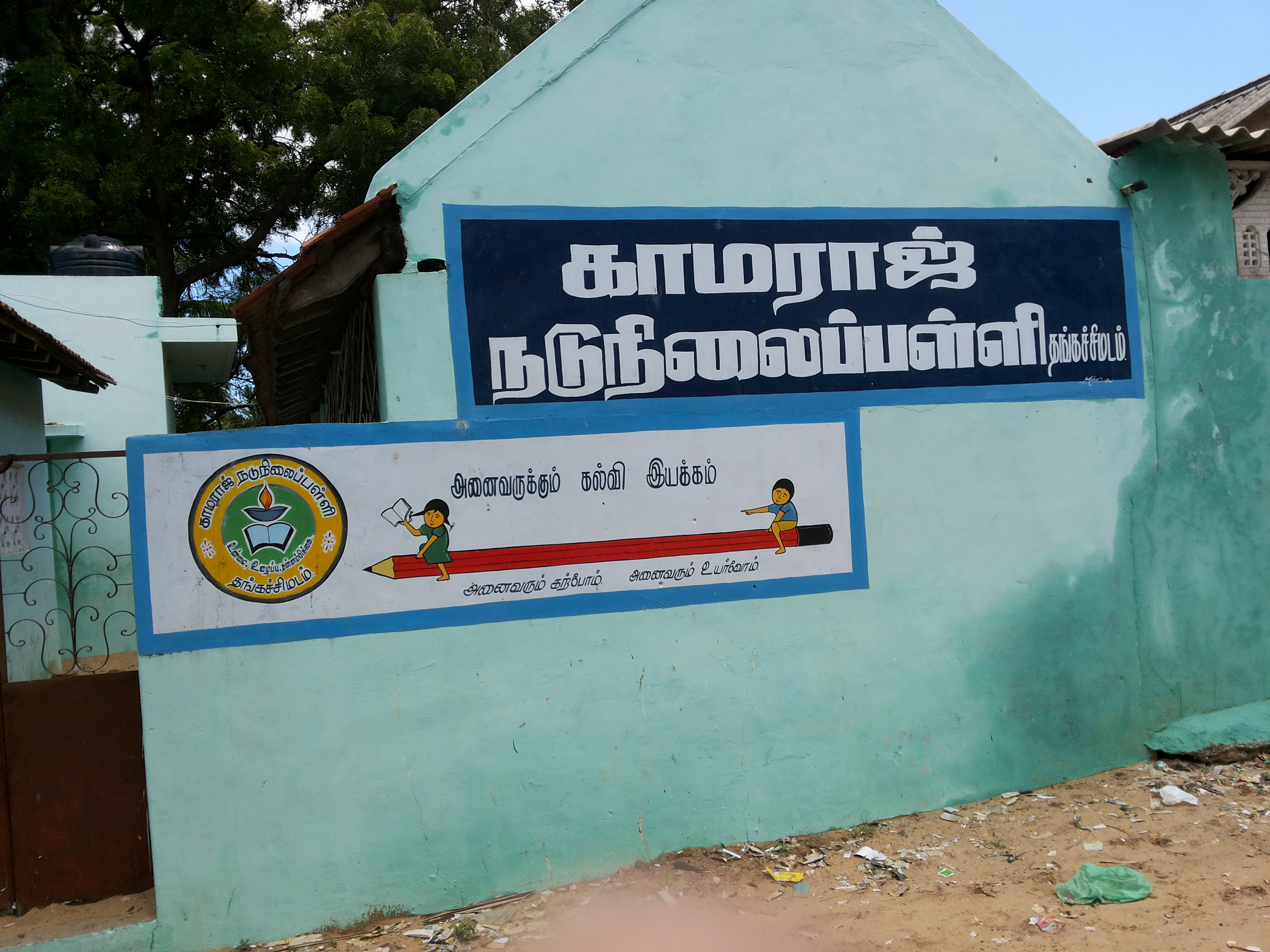
Kamaraj Middle School

- Kamaraj high school.
- King of Kings Matriculation School
- Infant Jesus Matriculation school.
- Al Hadi Primary school.
- St.James primary and nursery school
- St.Anne's Matriculation Higher Secondary school
- Udhayam Polytechnic College

== Notable people ==
- S. A. Chandrasekhar, Tamil Film director and Father of former actor and the current incumbent Chief Minister of Tamil Nadu, Thiru C. Joseph Vijay
- Elred Kumar, Tamil Film Producer
- Former President of India Dr. A. P. J. Abdul Kalam's resting place is at Ariyankundu Bus stop near Thangachimadam.
