= Naan Kadavul Illai =

- Official Release Poster
- Directed by: S. A. Chandrasekaran
- Written by: S. A. Chandrasekaran
- Starring: Samuthirakani; Sakshi Agarwal; Saravanan
- Cinematography: Magesh K. Dev
- Edited by: Prabhakar
- Music by: Siddharth Vipin
- Production company: Star Makers
- Release date: 3 March 2023
- Country: India
- Language: Tamil

Naan Kadavul Illai (transl. I am not God) is a 2023 Indian Tamil-language vigilante action film directed by S. A. Chandrasekaran, starring Samuthirakani and Sakshi Agarwal. It was released on 3 March 2023 in a clash against Bagheera (2023) and Ayothi (2023). Upon release, the movie was panned by the critics.

== Plot ==
Senthooran is a CID official who lives with his mother, wife and daughter. While he was working as a cop, he arrests murderer Veerappan. After a few years, Veerappan escapes from prison with the intention to take revenge on Senthooran and his family. Was Senthooran able to escape from Veerappan and save his family forms the crux of the story.

== Cast ==
- Samuthirakani as Senthooran
- S. A. Chandrasekaran
- Saravanan as Veerappan
- Ineya as Maisu
- Sakshi Agarwal as Leena
- Abi Saravanan
- Yuvan Mayilsamy
- Rohini
- Girija Hari
- Priyanka
- Theni Mayakka
- Dayanasri
- Baby Shasha
- Imman Annachi as Abdullah (uncredited)

== Production ==
The film began production during October 2020, with S. A. Chandrasekhar launching a directorial venture after media reports suggested that Capmaari (2019) would be his last film. The shoot of the film was completed by 2021, with promotions beginning during September 2021. On her action-related role in the film, Sakshi Agarwal took up stunt training from Kanal Kannan.

== Soundtrack ==
The soundtrack was composed by Siddharth Vipin.

- Kanne En Kanmaniye – Saindhavi, S. A. Chandrasekhar
- Oho Villain – MC Rude

== Reception ==
The film was released on 3 February 2023 across Tamil Nadu. Navein Darshan of Cinema Express rated with 1/5 and wrote "mediocrity thrives in this reckless revenge drama" and that the film was a "self-indulgent, overlong, incoherent rehash of the SAC formula". A critic from Dina Thanthi gave the film a negative review.
