= Innisai Mazhai =

- Film poster
- Directed by: Shoba
- Written by: Shoba (dialogues)
- Screenplay by: S. A. Chandrasekhar (unc.)
- Story by: Shoba
- Produced by: Joseph Vijay
- Starring: Neeraj; Parveen; Vivek; Sudhakar
- Cinematography: Chakravarthy
- Edited by: Gauthamaraj
- Music by: Ilaiyaraaja
- Production company: V. V. Creations
- Release date: 12 April 1992
- Running time: 140 minutes
- Country: India
- Language: Tamil

Innisai Mazhai (transl. Rain of music) is a 1992 Indian Tamil-language romantic musical film directed by Shoba Chandrasekhar and produced by her son Joseph Vijay. The film stars Neeraj, Parveen, Vivek and newcomer Sudhakar. It was released on 12 April 1992, and failed at the box office.

== Plot ==
Vijay, Mamta, Michael and Saravanan are members of a musical troupe. Michael and Saravanan are in love with Mamta, while Mamta loves Vijay. Vijay hates love and rejects her love. Shaken by his words, Mamta tries to commit suicide. Vijay's father brought him up alone and he doesn't even know his mother. So his father reveals that his mother is, in fact, Michael's mother. Finally, Vijay understands Mamta's love and accepts her it.

== Cast ==
- Neeraj as Vijay
- Parveen as Mamta
- Vivek as Michael
- Sudhakar Vasanth as Saravanan
- Vinodh as Surish
- Jai Ganesh as Sabesan, Mamta's father
- Prasanna as Vijay's father
- Sangeetha as Michael's mother
- Sudha as Mamta's mother
- Kumarimuthu as Saravanan
- Ganeshrao
- Jayabaal
- Joseph
- Super Subbarayan
- S. A. Chandrasekhar as Police officer

== Production ==
Innisai Mazhai was the second film directed by Shoba Chandrasekhar after Nanbargal (1991). The film was produced by her son Vijay, he was credited as Joseph Vijay in the title credits. Since it was a romantic story, S. A. Chandrasekhar insisted Shoba to direct this film as the audience branded him as a director who only makes films based on the law.

== Soundtrack ==
The music was composed by Ilaiyaraaja, with lyrics written by Vaali.

| Song | Singer(s) | Duration |
|---|---|---|
| "Adi Netriravu" | S. P. Balasubrahmanyam, S. Janaki | 4:47 |
| "Dhoori Dhoori Manathil Oru Dhoori" | S. P. Balasubrahmanyam, Shoba Chandrasekar | 4:33 |
| "Hello Hello" | Mythali | 5:14 |
| "Mangai Nee" | Ilaiyaraaja, S. N. Surendar | 4:15 |
| "Oru Patchai Kodi" | K. S. Chithra | 4:27 |
| "Oru Raaga" | S. P. Balasubrahmanyam, S. Janaki | 5:47 |
| "Therke Pirandha" | S. P. Balasubrahmanyam | 5:09 |
| "Vaa Vaa Kanmani" | S. P. Balasubrahmanyam, S. Janaki | 7:49 |
| "Vaa Vaa Mannava" | S. P. Balasubrahmanyam, S. Janaki | 5:40 |

== Reception ==
Mayilai Sridharan in his review for Kalki praised the music and locations but panned the script and acting. Similarly, K. Vijiyan of New Straits Times praised the music and locations but panned the lack of a story.
