= Hasida Hebbuli =

- Directed by: S. A. Chandrasekhar
- Written by: Shoba Chandrasekhar
- Screenplay by: S. A. Chandrasekhar
- Produced by: Venkataram
- Starring: Ambareesh; Ambika; Vajramuni; Tiger Prabhakar
- Cinematography: Vijay
- Edited by: Goutham Raj
- Music by: Satyam
- Production company: Sri Bhavani Shakthi Productions
- Release date: 27 September 1983
- Country: India
- Language: Kannada

Hasida Hebbuli (transl. Hungry tiger) is a 1983 Indian Kannada film, directed by S. A. Chandrasekhar. The film stars Ambareesh, Ambika, Vajramuni and Tiger Prabhakar. The film has Satyam. The film was a remake of director's own Tamil film Nenjile Thunivirunthal.

== Cast ==
- Ambareesh as Rajanna
- Ambika
- Vajramuni as Zamindar
- Tiger Prabhakar as Patel
- Dinesh
- Shakti Prasad
- M. S. Umesh
- Ravichandra
- Shashikala
- Vijayaranjini
- B. Jayashree
- Baby Rekha
- Master Sanjay
- Arikesari
- Vijayakashi

== Soundtrack ==
- "Savinenappu Yemanathe" – S. P. Balasubrahmanyam, S. Janaki
- "Praaya Matherithe" – S. P. Balasubrahmanyam, S. Janaki
- "Yello Aathodhuddoru" – S. P. Balasubrahmanyam
- "Ee Rathraadi Namakkaagi" – S. Janaki, Surendran
