= Nenjinile =

1999 film by S. A. Chandrasekhar

- Poster
- Directed by: S. A. Chandrasekhar
- Screenplay by: S. A. Chandrasekhar
- Story by: A. C. Jairam
- Produced by: S. A. Chandrasekhar
- Starring: Vijay; Isha Koppikar
- Cinematography: Vijay Milton
- Edited by: B. S. Vasu; Saleem
- Music by: Deva
- Production company: V. V. Creations
- Release date: 25 June 1999
- Running time: 139 minutes
- Country: India
- Language: Tamil

Nenjinile (transl. In My Heart) is a 1999 Indian Tamil-language crime action film written by A. C. Jairam and directed by S. A. Chandrasekhar. The film stars his son Vijay and Isha Koppikar in the lead roles, while Sonu Sood, Sriman, Nizhalgal Ravi, Devan and Manivannan play supporting roles. The film's music is composed by Deva with cinematography by Vijay Milton. The film is inspired by Abhimanyu (1991), which itself is based on the Hollywood film Scarface (1983). It was released on 25 June 1999.

== Plot ==
Karunakaran is from an indebted family in Ambasamudram; who are looking for a groom for his younger sister. However, because of the family's financial status, all suitors are turned away and so, Karunakaran decides to go to Mumbai in order to get his passport and head to Dubai for work. In Mumbai, he stays with his elder sister who is estranged from their parents as she had eloped to marry. Karunakaran pays an agent from Tamil Nadu in Mumbai, for obtaining visa for UAE but it turned out that he was a fraud. Knowing that he cannot return to his village empty-handed and happens to meet his childhood friend Chandru.

Chandru leads a comfortable life in Mumbai and while reluctant to introduce Karunakaran to his boss, Supari, but eventually does. Karunakaran is shocked to know that Chandru is a henchman for the gangster Supari but because of his financial situation, he agrees to join the gang. During one such instance of terrorising the city of Mumbai, he meets Nisha and she falls in love with him for saving her. Karunakaran also gets financially wealthy and is able to support his family, who have now renovated their house to look fancy and modern in the village.

Little does he know that Supari has a long term feud with Nisha's father Samraj, and ends up killing Samraj and his wife by breaking into their house with his gang including Karunakaran, Chandru and Sonu. Nisha is shocked seeing Karunakaran there and runs for safety. While Supari orders to kill the entire family including Nisha, Karunakaran runs away with her and protects her and explains the circumstances, convincing her that he was not at fault.

Now Supari is desperately looking for Karunakaran and wants to kill Nisha and him. In the crossfire, Chandru is killed by Supari's gang. In the meantime, Tamil Nadu police find out that Karunakaran is a gangster and come in search of him to his house, and the whole village gets to know that their luxurious life are because of the proceeds of crime. Karunakaran's father is insulted in public by a villager and as a result, the family commits mass suicide, including his younger sister.

Karunakaran gets to know the news and is heartbroken, and in his desperation, manages to kill Supari and runs away to Tamil Nadu with Nisha. However, Sonu is still desperate for revenge and the two meet at a temple. Karunakaran gives a long speech on how they are all educated youngsters and should look into productive employment as they are all educated but circumstances forced them to be gangsters. Sonu reforms and decides to leave Karunakaran and Nisha in peace, as they get together in the temple, ready to be married.

== Cast ==
- Vijay as Karunakaran
- Isha Koppikar as Nisha
- Manivannan as Arumugam
- Nizhalgal Ravi as Vaidyalingam, Karunakaran's father
- Devan as Samraj, Nisha's father
- Rami Reddy as Supari
- Sonu Sood as Sonu
- Sriman as Chandru, Karunakaran's friend
- Sathyapriya as Karunakaran's mother
- Sindhu as Amudha
- Sridevi as Vijaya, Karunakaran's sister
- S. N. Surendar as Karunakaran's brother-in-law
- S. A. Chandrasekhar as DCP Jai Dixit IPS
- Karikalan as Villager
- Sethu Vinayagam as Subramaniam
- Mahanadi Shankar as Samraj's henchman
- Thalapathy Dinesh as Supari's henchman
- Chaplin Balu as Arumugam's assistant
- Thadi Balaji as Balaji
- Kovai Senthil as Villager
- Rani in a special appearance
- Roja in a special appearance

== Production ==
Vijay recommended Isha Koppikar as the female lead to his father S. A. Chandrasekhar after being impressed with her performance in Kaadhal Kavithai, despite her lack of understanding of Tamil. An item number was shot with actress Roja in late March 1999. During the post-production stages, Chandrasekhar accused the son of K. Balachander of trying to make illegal copies of the film. The allegations prompted Vijay to pull out of a film he had agreed to act in under Balachander's production house.

== Soundtrack ==
The soundtrack was composed by Deva.

Track listing
No.	Title	Lyrics	Singer(s)	Length
1.	"Manase Manase"	Ra. Ravikumar	K. S. Chithra, P. Unnikrishnan	5:36
2.	"Anbe Anbe"	Vijayan	Hariharan	5:27
3.	"Prime Minister"	Palani Bharathi	S. N. Surendar, Harini	5:49
4.	"Thanga Nirathuku"	A. C. Jairam	Vijay, Swarnalatha	5:04
5.	"Madras Dhost"	Vaali	Krishnaraj, Anuradha Sriram, Naveen	5:39
6.	"Manasaey"	Kalaikumar	Hariharan, Sadhana Sargam	5:34
7.	"Sariya Thappa"	Vaali	Deva	4:43
Total length:				37:52

== Release and reception ==
The film was released on 25 June 1999. D. S. Ramanujam of The Hindu appreciated Vijay's performance, Chandrasekhar's screenplay and the fight choreography, but said Chandrasekhar "leaves much to be desired" in the comedy subplot. K. N. Vijiyan of New Straits Times wrote, "Those who go to see [Nenjinile] will either be fans of Vijay or those captivated by Isha". Ananda Vikatan rated the film 35 out of 100. However K. P. S. of Kalki gave a positive review, saying both Vijay and Chandrasekhar created a jugalbandi. A critic from Sify wrote that "Somewhere along the line Chandrasekar loses his senses and the screenplay takes twists and turns which only confuse the viewer and many times defy logic. [...] Choreography and cinematography are good and Vijay scores in dances and fights".
