= Palletoori Monagadu =

1983 Indian Telugu film by S. A. Chandrasekhar

- Theatrical release poster
- Directed by: S. A. Chandrasekhar
- Screenplay by: S. A. Chandrasekhar
- Produced by: Midde Rama Rao
- Starring: Chiranjeevi; Radhika Sarathkumar
- Music by: K. Chakravarthy
- Release date: 5 February 1983
- Country: India
- Language: Telugu

Palletoori Monagadu is a 1983 Telugu-language film directed by S. A. Chandrasekhar and produced by Midde Rama Rao. The film stars Chiranjeevi and Radhika Sarathkumar and was a remake of director's own Tamil film Nenjile Thunivirunthal. The film had musical score by K. Chakravarthy. It was a commercial success.

== Cast ==
- Chiranjeevi as Raja/Rajanna
- Radhika Sarathkumar as Rani/Dr. Santhi
- Maruthirao Gollapudi
- Rajesh as Ravi
- Poornima
- R. Narayana Murthy
- Suthi Veerabhadra Rao
- Suthi Velu

== Production ==
- Chiranjeevi was paid 1.25 lakh Rupees remuneration for the movie.

== Soundtrack ==
- "Paluke Bangarama" – S. P. Balasubrahmanyam, P. Susheela
- "Akkum Bakkum" – S. P. Balasubrahmanyam, P. Susheela
- "Jadaloni Banthi Puvvu" – S. P. Balasubrahmanyam, P. Susheela
- "Evvaroi Peddhollu" – S. P. Balasubrahmanyam
- "Gundegadhi Khaali" – S. P. Sailaja, N. Raja

== Box office ==
- The movie was commercially successful and ran for 100 days in Venkateswara Theater in Visakhapatnam and Lakshmi Theater in Vijayawada
