= Kooran (film) =

2025 Tamil film

- Theatrical release poster
- Directed by: Nithin Vemupati
- Written by: Screenplay & Dialogues: S. A. Chandrasekhar
- Story by: Nithin Vemupati
- Produced by: Vicky
- Starring: S. A. Chandrasekhar; Y. G. Mahendran; Balaji Sakthivel
- Cinematography: Martin Donraj
- Edited by: B. Lenin; K. Maruthi
- Music by: Siddharth Vipin
- Production company: Kanaa Productions
- Release date: 28 February 2025
- Running time: 110 minutes
- Country: India
- Language: Tamil

Kooran is a 2025 Indian Tamil-language legal drama film directed by Nithin Vemupati and co-written along with S. A. Chandrasekhar, starring himself, Y. G. Mahendran, Balaji Sakthivel in the lead roles, alongside Sathyan, George Maryan, Saravana Subbiah, Indraja Shankar, Madhankumar Dhakshinamoorthy, Kavitha Barathi and others in supporting roles. S. A. Chandrasekhar is a final acting film.

Kooran released in theatres on 28 February 2025.

== Plot ==
The movie begins with a tragic hit-and-run accident in which a puppy is killed. The mother dog, distraught and seeking justice, tries to get help. She ends up drawing the attention of Dharmaraj, a once-famous lawyer who is more or less retired or out of the spotlight. Dharmaraj learns that the person responsible for the hit-and-run is Ranjith Raja, the son of a powerful businessman named Sekhar Raja. Despite the challenges—legal, ethical, and societal—Dharmaraj takes on the case on behalf of the dog to seek justice. The story explores how a dog's grief and loyalty, combined with the law, can challenge powerful interests.

== Cast ==
- S. A. Chandrasekhar as Dharmaraj, a lawyer
- Y. G. Mahendran as Parthasarathy
- Balaji Sakthivel as Nanthagopal
- Sathyan as Manohar
- George Maryan as Antony
- Saravana Subbiah
- Indraja Shankar as Chithra
- Madhankumar Dhakshinamoorthy as Inspector Manikandan
- Kavitha Barathi

== Production ==
The film is directed by debutant Nithin Vemupati and produced by Kanaa Productions in association with VB Combines by Vicky. The film stars S. A. Chandrasekhar, Y. G. Mahendran, Balaji Sakthivel in the lead roles, alongside Sathyan, George Maryan, Saravana Subbiah, Indraja Robo Shankar, Madhan Dakshanamoorthy and Kavitha Barathi in supporting roles. The titular role is played by a trained police dog named Jancy. The technical team consists of Martin Donraj as the cinematographer, B. Lenin and K. Maruthi as the editors, Siddharth Vipin as the music composer, Vanaraj as the art director, and Muthamil as the lyricist.

Principal photography took place in Kodaikanal. The pre-release audio launch event held on 19 December 2024 in Chennai was attended by former Union Minister Maneka Gandhi who appealed for a tax exemption for the film.

== Release ==
Kooran released in theatres on 28 February 2025 in Tamil and also in a Hindi dubbed version titled Sarama.

== Reception ==
A critic of Dinamalar rated the film 2.75/5 stars praising the performances of the lead actors. Harshini SV of The Times of India gave 2.5/5 stars and wrote "While actors SA Chandrasekaran, YG Mahendran, Balaji Sakthivel, and George Mariyan play their parts beautifully to drive the story, the actual hero of Kooran – which is another word for dog in Tamil – is the mother dog! [...] This emotional connection we feel, along with the unique twists and a solid moral, make Kooran a unique thriller despite its shortcomings." Akshay Kumar of Cinema Express gave 1.5/5 stars and wrote "Kooran serves as a reminder that a good idea does not automatically translate into a good film—especially not through the over-the-top storytelling it relies on. The film aims to promote compassion toward animals but its execution betrays its noble intentions."
