= Veetuku Oru Kannagi =

- Poster
- Directed by: S. A. Chandrasekhar
- Screenplay by: S. A. Chandrasekhar
- Story by: Shoba Chandrasekhar
- Produced by: S. A. Chandrasekhar
- Starring: Vijayakanth; Sujatha; Nalini
- Cinematography: M. Kesavan
- Edited by: P. R. Gouthama Raj
- Music by: Shankar–Ganesh
- Production company: V. V. Creations
- Release date: 1 July 1984
- Running time: 144 minutes
- Country: India
- Language: Tamil

Veetuku Oru Kannagi (transl. A Kannagi for the house) is a 1984 Indian Tamil-language vigilante film, directed and produced by S. A. Chandrasekhar. The film stars Vijayakanth, Sujatha and Nalini. It was released on 1 July 1984.

== Plot ==
Suja, a noted writer, is married to inspector Chandrasekar and has a young daughter. Her sister is married to the abusive Ravi. Vijay is a journalist for a magazine focused on social justice issues and occasionally works with Suja. He meets the orphaned Maadhavi and two fall in love. Ravi kills Suja's sister and Chandrasekar arrests him. Ravi's business partner Meenakshisundaram and lawyer Mahendran conspire to twist the evidence. The court does not have the evidence to convict Ravi and he is freed. He then kills Suja's daughter in front of her; again, the justice system fails her as he has set up an alibi. Chandrasekar is heartbroken but still believes in the justice system. Suja has lost all faith on the system and is willing to take the law in her own hands in bid for revenge. Ravi is killed mysteriously but it is ruled a suicide. Chandrasekar and Ravi's associates suspect Suja but have no proof. The once loving couple are pitted against each other as Chandrasekar is determined to do his job and uphold the law. Suja, with the help of Vijay and Maadhavi, wants revenge.

== Cast ==
- Vijayakanth as Vijay
- Sujatha as Suja
- Jaishankar as Inspector Chandrasekhar
- Nalini as Maadhavi
- Sangili Murugan as Meenakshisundaram
- Y. G. Mahendran as Criminal Lawyer Mahendran
- Raveendar as Ravi
- Sathyakala as Kannagi
- Ilavarasi as Suja's sister
- Vennira Aadai Moorthy as Sub-Inspector Senthilnaathan
- Typist Gopu
- Raja
- Pasi Sathya
- Vani
- Ashadevi
- Jayamalini as Rani
- S. A. Chandrasekhar as Newspaper Delivery Person
- Anuradha as dancer

== Production ==
Silk Smitha was originally offered to act in the film. She refused, and the role went to Anuradha, who was paid half the remuneration offered to Smitha.

== Soundtrack ==
Soundtrack was composed by Shankar–Ganesh.

Track listing
No.	Title	Singer(s)	Length
1.	"Nee Venmalligai"	Vani Jairam, S. N. Surendar
2.	"Kallallada Mannallada"	P. Susheela
3.	"Then Paandi"	Vani Jairam, S. N. Surendar
4.	"Raatthiri Dhinam"	Shobha Sekhar

== Reception ==
Balumani of Anna said Vijayakanth's acting was routine and Sujatha's was the highlight of the film, concluding it was a must-watch not only for women but all progressive thinkers.
