= Nenjile Thunivirunthal =

- Title card
- Directed by: S. A. Chandrasekhar
- Screenplay by: S. A. Chandrasekhar
- Story by: Shoba Chandrasekhar
- Produced by: P. S. V. Hariharan
- Starring: Vijayakanth; Swapna
- Cinematography: D. D. Prasad
- Edited by: P. R. Gowthamraj
- Music by: Shankar–Ganesh
- Production company: Veeralakshmi Film Combines
- Release date: 29 August 1981
- Running time: 115 minutes
- Country: India
- Language: Tamil

Nenjile Thunivirunthaal (transl. If You Dare) is a 1981 Indian Tamil-language action drama film directed by S. A. Chandrasekhar, starring Vijayakanth and Swapna. It was released on 29 August 1981. The film was remade in Telugu as Palletoori Monagadu and in Kannada as Hasida Hebbuli.

== Plot ==
Muthu is falsely accused of murdering his father.

== Cast ==
- Vijayakanth as Muthu
- Swapna as Vasanthi
- Goundamani
- Manorama
- Vijayashanti
- Sangili Murugan
- Peeli Sivam

== Soundtrack ==
Soundtrack was composed by Shankar–Ganesh and lyrics by Vairamuthu, Pulamaipithan and Poonguyilan.

Track listing
No.	Title	Singer(s)	Length
1.	"Vangada"	Malaysia Vasudevan
2.	"Chitrame"	K. J. Yesudas, Vasantha
3.	"Kanniponne"	S. N. Surender, Vani Jairam
4.	"Oorumille"	S. P. Balasubrahmanyam, S. P. Sailaja
