= Neethikku Thandanai =

1987 film by S. A. Chandrasekhar

- Poster
- Directed by: S. A. Chandrasekhar
- Written by: M. Karunanidhi
- Produced by: S. S. Neelakantan; Shoba Chandrasekharan
- Starring: Radhika; Nizhalgal Ravi; Charan Raj
- Cinematography: Indu Chakravarthi
- Edited by: D. Shyam Mukherjee
- Music by: M. S. Viswanathan
- Production company: Lalithanjali Fine Arts
- Release date: 1 May 1987
- Running time: 143 minutes
- Country: India
- Language: Tamil

Neethikku Thandanai (transl. Punishment for Justice) is a 1987 Indian Tamil-language legal drama film, directed by S. A. Chandrasekhar and written by M. Karunanidhi. The film stars Radhika, Nizhalgal Ravi and Charan Raj, with Srividya in a prominent role. It was released on 1 May 1987. The film was remade in Hindi as Kudrat Ka Kanoon (1987) and in Telugu as Nyayaniki Siksha (1988).

== Plot ==
A doctor is wrongfully convicted of murder after helping an opponent of the tyrannical panchayat leader. The doctor's child is murdered when an inspector attempts to rape the former's wife. The victims are then represented in court by a female lawyer.

== Cast ==
- Radhika as Chithra and Sindhuja
- Nizhalgal Ravi as the doctor
- Charan Raj as the minister
- Senthil
- S. S. Chandran
- Senthamarai as the panchayat leader
- S. N. Vasanth
- Karnan
- Charuhasan
- V. Gopalakrishnan
- Senapathi
- Amjath Kumar
- Suruli Vel
- Nagaraja Chozhan
- Vairam Krishnamurthy
- LIC Narasimhan
- Omakuchi Narasimhan
- Kutty Padmini
- Kovai Sarala
- Sulochana
- Sri Asha
- Ravichandran
- Srividya as the lawyer
- S. A. Chandrasekhar

== Production ==
In the late 1980s, politician and writer M. Karunanidhi was arrested and director S. A. Chandrasekhar thought the law was wrong to do so; this inspired the title for their next film Neethikku Thandanai. Karunanidhi wrote the script while in prison. The original title was Idhu Nyayama (transl. Is this fair?), but Chandrasekhar changed it to Neethikku Thandanai.

== Soundtrack ==
The music was composed by M. S. Viswanathan. Swarnalatha, who made her playback singing debut with the song "Chinnanchiru Kiliye", based on the poem by Subramania Bharati, was chosen to sing the song by Viswanathan after he was impressed with her rendition of his composition "Paal Polave" from Uyarndha Manithan (1968), which he had asked her to sing during the song's audition. The film's "Chinnanchiru Kiliye" is set in Harikambhoji, a Carnatic raga.

Track listing
No.	Title	Lyrics	Singer(s)	Length
1.	"Chinnachiru Kiliye"	Subramania Bharati	K. J. Yesudas, Swarnalatha	4:50
2.	"Paavai Meethu Parijatham"		S. Janaki	4:18
3.	"Neethane Maharani"		Shoba Chandrasekhar, P. Susheela	6:14
4.	"Chinna Chiru Kiliye" (Slow)		Shoba Chandrasekhar	1:54
5.	"Manithargale O Manithargale"	Bharathiyar	Surendran	4:09

== Release and reception ==
Neethikku Thandanai was released on 1 May 1987. N. Krishnaswamy of The Indian Express wrote that the "story and narration are so thoroughly mired in preposterous situations". He went on to say, "M. S. Viswanathan has tuned a Bharathi song to good effect, but how come Bharathi agreed to write a song for this film?". Jayamanmadhan of Kalki praised the performances of Radhika, Srividya and Charanraj, and the dialogues by Karunanidhi, but criticised the film for suggesting that violence will solve problems. Radhika won the Filmfare Award for Best Actress – Tamil.

== Controversy ==
The film became controversial as it was seen as critical of the rule of the incumbent Chief Minister of Tamil Nadu, M. G. Ramachandran. The then ruling party AIADMK, led by Ramachandran, tried to halt the film's release by filing a case that it may disrupt law-and-order in Tamil Nadu, but Chandrasekhar overcame the case.

== Bibliography ==
- Rathinagiri, R. (2007). Time Capsule of Kalaignar. Dravida Munnetra Kazhagam. OCLC 233030854.
