= Senthoorapandi =

1993 film directed by S.A. Chandrasekhar

- Theatrical release poster
- Directed by: S. A. Chandrasekharan
- Screenplay by: S. A. Chandrasekharan
- Story by: Shoba
- Produced by: B. Vimal
- Starring: Vijayakanth; Gautami; Vijay; Yuvarani
- Cinematography: Ravishankar
- Edited by: P. R. Gautham Raj
- Music by: Deva
- Production company: B. V. Combines
- Distributed by: XB Film Creators
- Release date: 10 December 1993
- Running time: 138 minutes
- Country: India
- Language: Tamil

Senthoorapandi is a 1993 Indian Tamil-language romantic action film directed by S. A. Chandrasekharan. The film stars Vijay and Yuvarani in the lead roles with Vijayakanth as the titular character. It revolves around Vijay (Vijay) who falls in love with Meena. Meena's brother opposes their marriage due to rivalry between both the families, whereas Vijay's brother Senthoorapandi (Vijayakanth) returns from jail to help him to win his love.

The film was released on 10 December 1993, and performed well commercially.

== Plot ==
Vijay returns to his village after his studies, much to the happiness of his parents. He falls in love with Meena, the sister of local bigwig Ponnambalam. He opposes their love because Vijay belongs to a lower caste, and tries to kill the entire family. But Vijay's brother Senthoorappandi, who is just released from prison, shows up on time and saves them.

Through a flashback, we learn that Senthoorappandi and Marikozhundhu were in love and that was opposed by her family. But Senthoorappandi overpowers the opposition and marries her. Enraged, her uncle kills her. In retaliation, Senthoorappandi kills the uncle and goes to prison.

Now that Senthoorappandi is out of prison, he tries to convince Ponnambalam to get his sister married to Vijay, but Ponnambalam insults Senthoorappandi and rejects the proposal. Meena decides to marry Vijay against her brother's wishes. In an attempt to stop the wedding, Ponnambalam kills Vijay/Senthoorappandi's father.

Senthoorappandi proceeds with the wedding of his brother despite the killing of his father. Ponnambalam tries to stop the wedding, but Senthoorappandi fights him and kills him and goes to jail again, happy that Vijay and Meena are united.

== Cast ==
- Vijayakanth as Senthoorapandi
- Vijay as Vijay
- Yuvarani as Meena
- Vijayakumar as Senthoorapandi's father
- Manorama as Maruthaayi, Senthoorapandi's mother
- Ponnambalam as Ponnambalam, Meena's brother
- S. S. Chandran as Sundaralingam
- Tiruppur Ramasamy as Postman
- Chaplin Balu as Vijay's friend
- O. A. K. Sundar as Meena's suitor
- Meesai Murugesan as Meena's suitor's father
- Gauthami as Marikozhundhu (guest appearance)
- S. A. Chandrasekhar (guest appearance in "Aadadhada Aadadhada")

== Production ==
After Vijay's debut film as a lead actor Naalaiya Theerpu (1992) failed at the box-office, Chandrasekhar decided to cast an established actor alongside Vijay for his next film; Vijayakanth agreed to do the film for free.

== Soundtrack ==
The soundtrack was composed by Deva. For the dubbed Telugu version Bobbili Rayudu, all lyrics were written by Rajasri.

Tamil
No.	Title	Lyrics	Singer(s)	Length
1.	"Aadadhada Aadadhada"	P. R. C. Balu	Deva	4:12
2.	"Chinna Chinna"	Vaali	Mano, Swarnalatha	4:53
3.	"Mane Nane"	Vaali	S. N. Surendar, Swarnalatha	5:06
4.	"Pillayare Pillayare"	Vaali	Mano	3:50
5.	"Senthoora Pandikku"	Vaali	S. P. Balasubrahmanyam, K. S. Chithra	5:08
Total length:				23:09

Telugu
No.	Title	Singer(s)	Length
1.	"Manasa"	S. P. Balasubrahmanyam, K. S. Chithra	5:01
2.	"Sindura Puvvu"	S. P. Balasubrahmanyam, K. S. Chithra	5:05
3.	"Pilladhani"	S. P. Balasubrahmanyam, K. S. Chithra	3:45
4.	"Challanaina"	S. P. Balasubrahmanyam, K. S. Chithra	4:49
Total length:			18:42

== Reception ==
Malini Mannath of The Indian Express wrote it "turns out to be fairly engaging film". K. Vijiyan of New Straits Times wrote, "It is amazing Chandrasegaran went into production without a proper story. Rajarajan's cinematography is the saving grace in this movie which seems to have nothing new to say". Thulasi of Kalki panned the plot and violence but praised the cinematography and music. Ananda Vikatan gave the film a score of 30 out of 100.
