= Loves (film) =

- Directed by: K. Jayapandian
- Starring: Thamizh; Sona; Sweety
- Cinematography: Ravishankar
- Music by: Deva
- Release date: 30 July 2004
- Country: India
- Language: Tamil

Loves is a 2004 Indian Tamil-language romantic drama film directed by K. Jayapandian starring Thamizh, Sona and Sweety. The film was released on 30 July 2004.

== Cast ==
- Thamizh as Hari
- Sona as Mala
- Sweety as Amala
- Deva as Amala's brother
- Junior Silk as a lecturer
- Vadivelu
- Chaplin Balu
- Vijay Babu
- Shakeela as herself (guest appearance)

== Production ==
The film marked the debut of Vikram, a dentist by profession, who appeared under the stage name of Thamizh. Sona, the sister of actress Rajashree, also made her debut in Tamil cinema through the film. She had previously been attached to star in Sonnal Thaan Kaadhala (2001), under the stage name of Bobby, but was later removed from the project by director T. Rajender.

== Reception ==
Malini Mannath of Chennai Online wrote that "it's a time affair, with mediocre scripting and treatment" and that the "ending is thoughtless and insensitive too". She also compared the film's story to that of Punnagai Poove (2003).

Screen wrote "Debutante hero Tamizh is the only saving grace of the film. Aimed for the B&C; centers, director Jaipanian has introduced many ingredients to make the front benchers happy. [...] Comedy by Vadivelu is crude and obscene."
