= Pudhu Yugam (1985 film) =

- Title card
- Directed by: S. A. Chandrasekharan
- Screenplay by: S. A. Chandrasekharan
- Story by: Sundar
- Produced by: Shoba Sekhar
- Starring: Sivakumar; Vijayakanth; K. R. Vijaya; Viji
- Cinematography: M. Kesavan
- Edited by: P. R. Gauthamraj
- Music by: Gangai Amaran
- Production company: V. V. Creations
- Release date: 22 February 1985
- Running time: 120 minutes
- Country: India
- Language: Tamil

Pudhu Yugam (transl. New Era) is a 1985 Indian Tamil-language action drama film, directed by S. A. Chandrasekharan and produced by Shoba Chandrasekhar. The film stars Sivakumar, Vijayakanth, K. R. Vijaya and Viji. It is a remake of the Telugu film Mama Allula Saval (1980). The film was released on 22 February 1985.

== Cast ==
- Sivakumar as Rajasekar
- Vijayakanth as Vijay
- K. R. Vijaya as Saradha
- Viji as Radha
- Kalyan Kumar as Bhaskar
- Anuradha as Rekha
- Suryakanth as Bharathi
- Sangili Murugan
- Vennira Aadai Moorthy
- Y. G. Mahendran
- Pandari Bai
- Vanitha
- Sujitha
- V. Gopalakrishnan
- S. A. Chandrasekharan

== Production ==
The film saw Sivakumar and Vijayakanth sharing screen space together for first time.

== Soundtrack ==
The soundtrack was composed by Gangai Amaran.

Track listing
No.	Title	Lyrics	Singer(s)	Length
1.	"Poovo Ponno"	Na. Kamarasan	S. Janaki, K. J. Yesudas
2.	"Deivam Vandhadhu"	Pulamaipithan	Malaysia Vasudevan, S. N. Surendar, P. Susheela, Shoba Shekar
3.	"Azhage Nee Azhalamaa"	Vaali	S. N. Surender, Shoba Shekar
4.	"Sooderum"	Muthulingam	S. N. Surender, Vani Jairam

== Reception ==
Jayamanmadhan (a duo) of Kalki felt there were too many plots to recall and that Sivakumar's role and performance as nothing to speak about. The duo also felt Y. G. Mahendra, Moorthy and Sangili Murugan as antagonists looked more like sacrificial lambs than menacing. Balumani of Anna praised acting, music, cinematography.
