= Enakku Nane Needipathi =

- Poster
- Directed by: S. A. Chandrasekhar
- Screenplay by: S. A. Chandrasekhar
- Story by: Shoba
- Produced by: Kovai Chezhiyan
- Starring: Vijayakanth; Jeevitha; Jaishankar; Lakshmi
- Cinematography: M. Kesavan
- Edited by: D. Shyam Mukerjee
- Music by: Ilaiyaraaja
- Production company: KayCey Film Combines
- Release date: 18 July 1986
- Running time: 132 minutes
- Country: India
- Language: Tamil

Enakku Nane Needipathi (transl. I am my own judge) is a 1986 Indian Tamil-language action drama film, directed by S. A. Chandrasekhar and produced by Kovai Chezhiyan. The film stars Vijayakanth, Jeevitha, Jaishankar and Lakshmi. It was released on 18 July 1986, and became a success.

== Cast ==
- Vijayakanth as Vijay
- Jeevitha as Devika
- Jaishankar as Inspector Devaraj
- Lakshmi as Gowri
- Major Sundarrajan as I.P.S Ranadurai
- S. A. Chandrasekhar as Advocate Chandrasekhar
- Senthamarai as Raj
- Vinu Chakravarthy as Rathnasamy
- Senthil as Arivazhagan
- Kovai Sarala as Police constable Kannamma
- Suryakanth as Rowdy
- Idichapuli Selvaraj as Teacher
- Ennathe Kannaiah as Police constable
- LIC Narasimhan as Advocate
- Anuradha as Item number

== Production ==
The car chase scene where Jaishankar chases gangsters to rescue Sulakshana was shot around Chennai especially Congress exhibition.

== Soundtrack ==
The music was composed by Ilaiyaraaja.

Song	Singers	Lyrics	Length
"Ammaiyappa"	Malaysia Vasudevan	Gangai Amaran	03:12
"Ichandru Ichandru Mutham"	Yesudas, S. Janaki	Pulamaipithan	04:32
"Thiruda Thiruda"	K. S. Chithra	Muthulingam	04:30
"Yaaro Sonagalam"	S. P. Sailaja	Vaali	04:36
