= Kudumbam (1984 film) =

1984 film by S. A. Chandrasekhar

- Poster
- Directed by: S. A. Chandrasekhar
- Screenplay by: S. A. Chandrasekhar
- Story by: Shoba Chandrasekhar
- Produced by: S. S. Neelakantan
- Starring: Vijayakanth; Devisri; Jaishankar; Sujatha
- Cinematography: M. Kesavan
- Edited by: P. R. Goutham Raj
- Music by: Gangai Amaran
- Production company: Lalithaanjali
- Release date: 22 November 1984
- Running time: 135 minutes
- Country: India
- Language: Tamil

Kudumbam (transl. Family) is a 1984 Indian Tamil-language drama film, directed by S. A. Chandrasekhar. The film stars Vijayakanth, Devisri, Jaishankar and Sujatha. It was released on 22 November 1984.

== Plot ==
Vijay falls in love with Devi. With the empowerment of Shankar and her sister Vijaya, the marriage is granted. While Vijay cannot find time with Devi for entertainment. She gives birth to a baby but Devi suddenly dies. An argument takes place in the family and he decides to divide his entourage by sharing the house. Vijay gets his daughter, raised by his sister but runs away with Raja, son of Vijaya. Both children are in the street but are and recovered, protected by Latha. Gangs are trying to capture his children, but Vijay and Latha are helping them. The film ends when the family also gets closer to them.

== Cast ==
- Vijayakanth as Vijay
- Devisri as Devi
- Jaishankar as Shankar
- Sujatha as Vijaya
- Sripriya as Latha
- Sangili Murugan as Kanthasamy
- Vennira Aadai Moorthy as Palamozhi Mama
- S. A. Chandrasekhar as Sekhar
- M. R. Krishnamurthy as Aadiyapatham
- Kallapetti Singaram as Singaram
- Pasi Sathya as Vasantha
- Master Suresh as Raja
- Vijay as Narada
- Jayamalini in Guest Appearance
- Manorama in Guest Appearance
- Y. G. Mahendran in Guest Appearance

== Soundtrack ==
Soundtrack was composed by Gangai Amaran.

Title	Singer	Length
"Chinna Ponnu Naniruken"	Vani Jairam	04:58
"Nelagiri Poove"	S. N. Surendar, S. Janaki	04:28
"Thedamal Dheivam"	P. Susheela	03:52
"Nalla Kudumbam"	Gangai Amaran, Ilaiyaraaja	02:50

== Reception ==
Jayamanmadhan of Kalki panned the acting and the characterisation of actors.
