= Vasantha Raagam =

- DVD cover
- Directed by: S. A. Chandrasekhar
- Story by: Shoba
- Produced by: Shoba
- Starring: Vijayakanth; Rahman; Sudha Chandran
- Cinematography: M. Kesavan
- Edited by: D. Shyam Mukherjee
- Music by: M. S. Viswanathan
- Production company: V. V. Creations
- Release date: 1 August 1986
- Running time: 128 minutes
- Country: India
- Language: Tamil

Vasantha Raagam (transl. Tune of spring) is a 1986 Indian Tamil-language romantic drama film, directed by S. A. Chandrasekhar and produced by his wife Shoba who wrote the story. The film stars Vijayakanth, Rahman and Sudha Chandran. It was released on 1 August 1986. Despite the film's lackluster box office performance, its story was adapted into the 1992 Hindi film Deewana.

== Plot ==
A young journalist Raghu falls in love with Vasantha. As advised by a senior journalist colleague Chandrasekhar, Raghu eventually confesses his feelings to his lady love. Vasantha is revealed to be a widow. Raghu and Vasantha eventually marry, with the approval of Vasantha's mother, who was initially hesitant. It is revealed through flashback that Vasantha was deeply in love and about to be married to Vijay but he dies in an accident. In sadness, and in attempting to move forward, Vasantha and Vasantha's mother (Vijay's older sister) shift base to Madras.

In a strange twist of fate, Vijay is shown to have mistakenly been declared deceased. He is alive and now a famous stage singer. Vasantha and Raghu meet Vijay as audience members at one of his shows. Vasantha hides her shock not to make Raghu suspicious. Raghu remains clueless about his wife's past with Vijay. Raghu is only aware that Vasantha was a widow before him marrying her and asks nothing further. Raghu is impressed with Vijay's musical abilities and looks up to him as an elder brother figure.

Vijay's older sister is alerted to Vijay's presence by her daughter Vasantha and goes to Vijay's hotel room to meet him. She is emotional and shocked that Vijay is indeed alive. She is distraught that she got Vasantha married to Raghu, while Vijay was active. She apologises to her younger brother Vijay and says she got her daughter Vasantha married as everyone thought Vijay had died. She requests her younger brother to leave Madras not to interfere or cause problems to her daughter Vasantha's marriage. Vijay is overwhelmed and begs his sister to let him remain in Madras. He promises never to be seen by them but that he will merely admire his beloved Vasantha from a distance. Vasantha's mother is still not happy with this and feels that Vijay should leave Madras in everyone's best interests.

Vijay gets a cab to Madras Airport to leave the city, but the cab driver is intoxicated, and they both meet with a non-fatal car accident. Vijay is taken to hospital, and Raghu is informed as he is listed as Vijay's contact person. Raghu brings Vijay back to his house to recuperate. Raghu hosts a house party to commemorate his first wedding anniversary with Vasantha. Vijay is requested to sing a song and entertain the guests. After the guests leave, it is inadvertently revealed to Raghu that Vasantha was meant to be married to Vijay, but everyone assumed Vijay had died.

On discovering this hidden truth, Raghu feels he has come between the true love of Vijay and Vasantha and decides to leave town so they can unite. Vasantha and Vasantha's mother assures Raghu that Vasantha is committed to her marriage to Raghu and that despite Vijay being alive, he has been considered long dead and they have moved on with their lives. Vijay leaves Raghu's house and returns to his hotel room.

Vijay writes a heartfelt letter to Raghu and Vasantha wishing them all the best for their future and that they belong to each other as rightful husband and wife. Raghu, Vasantha and Vasantha's mother arrive at Vijay's hotel room to read Vijay's letter. Vijay, tragically, commits suicide by shooting himself in the head. Unable to bear the pain of living a life without his Vasantha, he chooses to escape the problem forever.

== Cast ==
- Vijayakanth as Vijay
  - Vijay as Child Vijay
- Rahman as Raghu
- Sudha Chandran as Vasantha
- S. A. Chandrasekhar as Chandrasekhar
- Radha Ravi as Minister Anbarasan
- Y. G. Mahendra
- Senthil as Chinnamalai
- Kovai Sarala as Devi
- C. R. Vijayakumari as Vasantha's mother
- Idichapuli Selvaraj as Mudhi Azhagan
- S. Shankar as printing press worker

== Production ==
The scene where Rahman dances with patients in a hospital was shot at Prasad Studios.

== Soundtrack ==
The music was composed by M. S. Viswanathan & Lyrics were written by Vaali and PulamaiPithan.

Track listing
No.	Title	Lyrics	Singer(s)	Length
1.	"Thedatha Idamellam"	Vaali	S. P. Balasubrahmanyam
2.	"Kannan Manam Allavo"	Pulamaipithan	S. Janaki
3.	"Naan Amudha"	Vaali	S. N. Surendar
4.	"Sogam Dhaana"	Vaali	Vani Jairam
5.	"Naan Ulladhai Sollattume"	Vaali	P. Susheela, K. J. Yesudas, S. N. Surendar
6.	"Oru Deivam"	Pulamaipithan	S. P. Balasubrahmanyam, Vani Jairam

== Reception ==
Jayamanmadhan (a duo) of Kalki appreciated the music but criticised the story, and complemented Chandrasekhar for trying to deviate from his usual revenge-themed films.
