= Om Sakthi =

- Directed by: S. A. Chandrasekhar
- Produced by: M. Muthuraman
- Starring: Vijayakanth; Menaka
- Cinematography: D. D. Prasad
- Edited by: P. R. Gowthamraj
- Music by: Shankar–Ganesh
- Release date: 21 May 1982
- Country: India
- Language: Tamil

Om Sakthi is a 1982 Indian Tamil-language Tamil drama film directed by S. A. Chandrasekhar, starring Vijayakanth and Menaka. Vijayakanth played a negative role and Jaishankar made a special appearance. It was released on 21 May 1982, and failed at the box office, leading to a brief career setback for Vijayakanth.

== Cast ==
- Vijayakanth as Kathavarayan
- Menaka as Kanniamma / Amman
- R. Dilip
- Jaishankar as Singaram
- Nalini as Anandhi
- Lalitha as Shenbagam

== Soundtrack ==
The music was composed by Shankar–Ganesh.

Title	Singer(s)	Length
"Abirama Valliyenum Thiruvale"	Deepan Chakravarthy	04:33
"Engaee Engaee Nee Pogirai"	S. Janaki	05:43
"Omkariye Maa Kaliye"	S.P. Sailaja, T. L. Maharajan	05:35
"Oothu Naa Sorgatha Pakumvara"	S. P. Balasubrahmanyam	04:52

== Reception ==
Balumani of Anna newspaper wrote that, on the whole, Om Sakthi does have some kind of power.
