= Naalaiya Theerpu =

1992 Tamil film directed by S. A. Chandrasekhar

- Theatrical release poster
- Directed by: S. A. Chandrasekhar
- Screenplay by: S. A. Chandrasekhar
- Story by: Shoba Chandrasekaran
- Produced by: Shoba Chandrasekaran
- Starring: Vijay; Keerthana
- Cinematography: R. P. Imayavaramban
- Edited by: Gautham Raju
- Music by: Manimekalai
- Production company: V. V. Creations
- Release date: 4 December 1992
- Running time: 140 minutes
- Country: India
- Language: Tamil

Naalaiya Theerpu (transl. Tomorrow's Verdict) is a 1992 Indian Tamil-language vigilante action film directed by S. A. Chandrasekhar and produced by his wife Shoba Chandrasekaran, which marked the debut of their son Vijay as a leading actor. The film also stars Keerthana, Easwari Rao, Srividya, Radha Ravi and Sarath Babu. The music was composed by newcomer Manimekalai with cinematography by R. P. Imayavaramban and editing by Gautham Raju.

The film revolves around a businessman who has many extramarital affairs and molests his wife. However, things take an unexpected turn when she becomes pregnant and has a son who later avenges his father's deeds.

The film was released on 4 December 1992 to mostly negative reviews and became a box-office bomb. However, Vijay won the Cinema Express Award for Best New Face Actor.

== Plot ==
Vijay is a college student who lives with his mother Mahalakshmi and has a strong sense of justice. He works part-time for a newspaper to supplement his income. At his college, he has rivals Rocky Mehta (the son of billionaire Arun Mehta) and his girlfriend Rani (the daughter of Minister Sundaramoorthy), who are arrogant. His classmate Priya is in love with him, and at one point it becomes mutual, but Rocky misbehaves with Priya, leading to Vijay beating up Rocky along with his friends. Rocky uses his business and political influence to have Vijay sacked from his job. The same newspaper prints false news about Vijay, alleging that he was engaging in rowdyism in college, leading to his rustication and arrest.

Vijay is reinstated at the college following protests from students, who definitively demand Rocky's dismissal, which they accept under duress. During Vijay's trial, he is defended by his mentor and lawyer, who is also Priya's brother. While the evidence was perfectly against Vijay, Priya's brother corners the public prosecutor by appealing to his religious sentiments, saying he lacks a conscience and curses him to ruin if he does not admit the truth. Out of fear, the public prosecutor admits that all evidence against Vijay is fabricated, and thus, Vijay is acquitted.

However, Vijay's friends ask him why he refused to disclose his father's name during his trial. He reveals that he is, in fact, Arun's only son, but Arun was abusive towards Mahalakshmi. At one point, when Arun entered the house with the woman he was having an affair with (Rocky's mother), while Mahalakshmi objected, Arun tried to slap her. Vijay blocked Arun and left the house angrily, with his mother ripping off the nuptial thread and handing it back to Arun.

In the present, Vijay's friends admire him more, given how he walked away from billions of family wealth through his father. Priya's brother says that if Vijay wants to bring down Arun, he has to do it properly and suggests they start their own newspaper. With his help, they start a newspaper called Naalaiya Theerpu. Frustrated at the events, Rocky, to exact his revenge, kidnaps, assaults, and murders Priya. This leaves Vijay and her brother heartbroken, but Rani has a change of heart and joins Vijay in his revolution to topple Arun.

Rani secretly films her father and Arun accusing one another and, in return, confessing that Arun looted millions in a stock market scam and an illegal liquor business, and how Sundaramoorthy helped in his business pursuits using political power. Rani escapes her house, and despite Sundaramoorthy trying to shoot her, she was smart enough to have removed the bullets from the pistol. Thus, she hands the video to Vijay, who starts preparing the article on their newspaper exposing the criminal businesses of Arun. However, Arun's goons ransack the Naalaiya Theerpu office, and in the process, Priya's brother is also killed. In his last words, he makes Vijay promise not to take up violence and to ensure the newspaper's publication. The newspaper is published, and Arun is cornered.

Not knowing what to do, Arun returns to Mahalakshmi begging for forgiveness, but Vijay had already taken a promise from her that she would not relent under any circumstances. Left with no choice, Arun decides to kill his accomplices who turned approvers against him and Sundaramoorthy. Vijay, to avoid this, plans a decoy strategy where Arun will think that witnesses are in one car and would blow it up, but others will safely escort them to court. The friends fight over who gets to be the decoy as each wants to sacrifice their life for the revolution, but Vijay says they would draw lots. His mother selects Vijay's; she cries, and once Vijay left, she realizes that Vijay wrote his own name on every chit.

Meanwhile, Rocky decides to manipulate the judge and threatens to kill the judge's granddaughter if she does not deliver a judgement in favour of Arun and Sundaramoorthy. The judge starts to read her acquittal of Arun and Sundaramoorthy while declaring Vijay's student revolution to be a front for terrorism, but reveals that she does it under duress. When the students are ready to sacrifice their lives for a larger cause, she feels her granddaughter could also be a sacrifice for the greater cause. Thus, she sentences Arun and Sundaramoorthy to death, and as the icing on the cake, Vijay saves the granddaughter just in time from Rocky and enters the court after fighting off all of Arun's goons. The story ends with a note on the student revolution continuing.

== Cast ==
- Vijay as Vijay
- Keerthana as Priya
- Eswari Rao as Rani
- Srividya as Mahalakshmi Metha
- Radha Ravi as Arun Metha
- Vinu Chakravarthi as Minister Sundaramoorthy
- Gowtham Sundararajan as Rocky Metha
- K. R. Vijaya as Judge
- Sarath Babu as Priya's brother
- Dhamu as Dhamu, Vijay's friend
- Srinath as Vijay's friend
- Mansoor Ali Khan as Inspector
- Major Sundarrajan as D.P
- V. Gopalakrishnan as Police Commissioner
- S. S. Chandran as MLA Meenakshisundaram
- Jai Ganesh as Rajasekhar, college principal
- Pandu as Lecturer
- Typist Gopu as Police Constable
- S. N. Surendar as Press Editor
- K. S. Jayalakshmi as Ambika
- Chaplin Balu as Vijay's friend
- Kavitha

== Production ==
Vijay made his debut as a leading actor with the film, aged eighteen. A fan of Rajinikanth, he told Chandrasekhar that he wanted to headline a film. Vijay enacted a scene from Annaamalai (1992), the one in which the title character (Rajinikanth) challenges Ashok (Sarath Babu). Chandrasekhar recalled, "He did it exactly the way it was in the film [...] That's when I realised that he had talent, a fierce passion".

== Soundtrack ==
The music was composed by M. M. Srilekha, under the name of Manimekalai at the age of 12. The film featured lyrics written by Pulamaipithan, P. R. C. Balu and Bharani. The latter went on to become a popular music composer. The audio rights were acquired by Pyramid Music and Phoenix Music.

Track listing
No.	Title	Singer(s)	Length
1.	"Aayiram Erimalai"	S. P. Balasubrahmanyam	4:49
2.	"Ammadi Rani"	S. N. Surendar, Minmini	4:51
3.	"Maapillai Naan"	S. N. Surendar, Minmini, Manimekalai	7:41
4.	"Vaadai Kulirkatru"	K. S. Chithra	4:58
5.	"MTV Parthuputta"	Sangeetha Sajith	5:06
6.	"Udalum Intha Uyirum"	S. P. Balasubrahmanyam, K. S. Chithra	4:35
7.	"Udalum Intha Uyirum" (Sad)	S. P. Balasubrahmanyam, K. S. Chithra	4:30
Total length:			36:30

== Release and reception ==
Naalaiya Theerpu was released on 4 December 1992. Ayyappa Prasad of The Indian Express wrote, "Many tongue-in-cheek remarks on the prevailing political and economic climate makes the film worth watching". However, other reviews were mostly negative, including the magazine Kumudam which wrote, "Should we pay to see this face in theaters?" Despite Chandrasekhar's confidence, Naalaiya Theerpu became a box-office bomb. Chandrasekhar recalled in 2018, "To be honest, I shouldn’t have made that film for him especially when he was just 18 [...] I thought now that my son is also becoming an actor, I could continue to practise my style of filmmaking and pass on socially relevant messages to the audience through him. Maybe the timing wasn't right". Despite the film's failure, Vijay won the Cinema Express Award for Best New Face Actor.
