= Capmaari =

2019 Indian film directed by S. A. Chandrasekhar

- Directed by: S. A. Chandrasekhar
- Written by: S. A. Chandrasekhar
- Starring: Jai; Vaibhavi Shandilya; Athulya Ravi
- Cinematography: M. Jeevan
- Edited by: Prasanna GK
- Music by: Siddharth Vipin
- Production company: Green Signal
- Release date: 13 December 2019
- Running time: 133 minutes
- Country: India
- Language: Tamil

Capmaari (transl. Fraud) is a 2019 Indian Tamil-language sex comedy film written and directed by S. A. Chandrasekhar. The film stars Jai, Vaibhavi Shandilya and Athulya Ravi. It is also the 25th film of Jai. The music was composed by Siddharth Vipin with cinematography by M. Jeevan and editing by Prasanna GK. The film was released on 13 December 2019.

== Plot ==
Jai an IT professional, happens to share a coach with Jeni during a train journey. The duo strikes a conversation and soon sharing beers and the bed too. After two years, they meet accidentally in Chennai and recognize each other, and for some inexplicable reason, decide to get married. Meanwhile, Jai's colleague Varsha likes him, and although it is obvious, she never explicitly says it to him.

One day, Jai drops Varsha at her home after work. At her home, both of them drink beer, get boozed and enter into physical relationship. Jai returns to his home at midnight which makes Jeni furious. Jeni doubts Jai about having an affair with Varsha. Surprisingly, Jeni secures a job in Jai's office. Trouble erupts between Jeni and Varsha following which Varsha challenges that she would take Jai with her soon.

Varsha enters Jai's house claiming that she is pregnant which shocks everyone. Jeni decides to divorce Jai, however her love for Jai does not make to take this decision and she keeps forgiving him. Varsha says that Jai should be shared between her and Jeni. Finally, Jai is angered and sends Varsha out from his house saying that he loves only Jeni. Jeni patches up with Jai believing he has ditched Varsha.

A few years later, it is shown that Jai maintains relationship with both the women along with their children – but hiding this truth from Jeni. Jeni learns of this and the movie ends on the funny note that she beats up Jai.

== Cast ==
- Jai as Jai Vel / Albert Jai
- Vaibhavi Shandilya as Jeniliya
- Athulya Ravi as Varsha
- Livingston as Jai's father
- Rindhu Ravi as Jai's mother
- Sathyan as J. D.
- Srinivasan as Power Pandy Durai
- Devadarshini as Priya
- Siddharth Vipin as Venky
- Crane Manohar as Census Officer
- Thadi Balaji as Car Salesman
- Sharmila Thapa as Sangi
- Rahul Thatha as Man in the bar
- Vetrivelan as David
- S. A. Chandrasekhar as Police Inspector

== Production ==
The film began production as Love Matter. However, the name of the film was later revealed to be Capmaari. It is also known by the initialism CM.

== Soundtrack ==
Capmaari

Soundtrack album by Siddharth Vipin
- Recorded: 2019
- Genre: Feature film soundtrack
- Labels: Studio Plus Entertainment; Video Park
- Producer: Siddharth Vipin

Siddharth Vipin chronology
Thirumanam (2019)	Capmaari (2019)	Battery (2022)

The soundtrack of the film is composed by Siddharth Vipin. The song "En Kadhal Rani Enna Thooki Veesitta" was filmed at MGR Film City with 50 dancers from Mumbai.

- "Ummunu Irukkanum" – Anirudh Ravichander
- "Capmaari Anthem" – MC Vicky, Syed Abu
- "Naan Oruthikitta" – Haricharan
- "Ippadi Or Inbam" – Neha Nair
- "Ethir Paarkala" – Sanjith Hegde Pallavi Vinothkumar
- "Romba Romba Pudikuthu" – Vijay Antony, Neha Nair

== Release and reception ==
The film was scheduled to release on 6 December, but was later postponed to 13 December.

The Indian Express wrote "The director's lack of understanding of modern romance and his problematic perspectives are not the only problems with Capmaari. The pressing issue here is the misreading of the genre of adult comedy". It gave the film the worst possible rating of 0.5 out of 5, stating the movie a big "disaster" in the review. The Times of India wrote "The first few minutes of a film usually tell you what to expect, and Capmaari reveals what it has in store in its opening scene – titillation in the guise of a romcom about modern-day youngsters".
