= Sattam Oru Vilaiyattu =

- Poster
- Directed by: S. A. Chandrasekhar
- Screenplay by: M. Karunanidhi
- Story by: Shoba Chandrasekhar
- Produced by: Shoba Chandrasekhar
- Starring: Vijayakanth; Radha; Ravichandran
- Music by: M. S. Viswanathan
- Production company: VV Creations
- Release date: 21 October 1987
- Running time: 132 minutes
- Country: India
- Language: Tamil

Sattam Oru Vilaiyattu (transl. The Law is a Game) is a 1987 Indian Tamil-language vigilante action film, directed by S. A. Chandrasekhar and produced by Shoba Chandrasekhar. The film stars Vijayakanth, Radha and Ravichandran. It revolves around a man seeking to avenge the murder of his mother and younger brother. The film was released on 21 October 1987.

== Plot ==
As a boy, Raja saw his mother and younger brother murdered. He saw too that his police inspector father DCP Needhi Manikkam was powerless to get the murderer convicted as there was no evidence.

As a young man under the name of Vijay, he gets even with the criminal Mathappu Sundaram killing each one of his three sons. One under water, the second from a mountain peak, the third murder is made to look as if it were an accident with the car carrying the victim hurtling off the peak.

== Cast ==
- Vijayakanth as Raja /Joseph Vijay
  - Vijay as young Raja
- Radha as Veni
- Ravichandran as DCP Needhi Manikkam
- Srividya as Amudha
- S. A. Chandrasekhar as Peter Fernandez
- Senthamarai as Mathappu Sundaram
- S. S. Chandran as Vairavelu
- Senthil as Lingesan
- Kamala Kamesh as Nair's wife
- Omakuchi Narasimhan

== Soundtrack ==
The music was composed by M. S. Viswanathan.

Song	Singers	Lyrics	Length
"Nee Pirantha Podhu"	Vidya	Gangai Amaran	4:14
"Oru Brindavanam" – Small	S. P. Balasubrahmanyam, Vani Jayaram, Shoba Sekar and Sheela	Pulamaipithan	1:01
"Oru Brindavanam"	S. P. Balasubrahmanyam, Vani Jayaram, Shoba Sekar and Sheela	Pulamaipithan	4:47
"Sugam Tharum Nila"	S. P. Balasubrahmanyam and K. S. Chithra	Pulamaipithan	5:14
"Oru Kulla Nari"	Yesudas, S. N. Surendar and Shoba Sekar	Pulamaipithan	4:32

== Release and reception ==
Sattam Oru Vilaiyattu was released on 21 October 1987, alongside another Vijayakanth film Uzhavan Magan on Diwali day. However, both films went on to become super hits at the box office. The Indian Express wrote, "The screenplay is utterly contrived and there is nothing new either in M. Karunanidhi's dialogues [..] or S. A. Chandrasekhar's treatment which is as hackneyed as ever". Jayamanmadhan of Kalki questioned why Karunanidhi would associate his name for this kind of third rated films.
