= Shoba Chandrasekhar =

Indian playback singer (born 1948)

- Born: 24 August 1948 (age 78); Madras Presidency, Dominion of India
- Occupations: Playback singer; Screenwriter; Film producer; Film director
- Years active: 1967–2015
- Spouse: S. A. Chandrasekhar
- Children: 2 (Note: One is deceased.) including C. Joseph Vijay
- Relatives: S. N. Surendar (brother); Sangeetha Vijay (daughter-in-law)

Shoba Chandrasekhar (born 24 August 1948) is an Indian playback singer, screenwriter, film producer and film director. She is the mother of former actor and the ninth chief minister of Tamil Nadu C Joseph Vijay.

== Others ==
In 2011, she was appointed as the Artistic Heritage Consultant by the order of the Tamil Nadu Chief Minister J. Jayalalithaa.

== Film career ==
She was a singer in light music troupes. She later graduated to singing in films. Her first film song was "Maharaja Oru Maharani..." from the film Iru Malargal.

She has written several stories that have been made into movies by moviemaker husband S. A. Chandrasekhar mostly starring Vijayakanth and Vijay.

Her first light classical music programme was telecast on Vijay TV in April 2003. The title of the programme was "Samarpanam".

She has produced 10 films and written stories for more than 50. She also directed two films, Nanbargal and Innisai Mazhai. In fact, Chandrasekhar worked as her associate director in these films. He was assisted by Shankar, now a famous director. She also sang over 12 movies.

== Personal life ==
Shoba is married to film director S. A. Chandrasekhar on April 24, 1973. Their son Vijay is a former actor in Tamil cinema and the incumbent Chief Minister of Tamil Nadu since 2026. Their daughter Vidya died at the age of 2.

== Filmography ==
- Note: she was mostly credited as Shoba and was sometimes credited as Shoba Chandrasekaran.

Year	Film	Director	Writer	Producer	Notes
1982	Pattanathu Rajakkal	No	Story	No	
1984	Kudumbam	No	Story	No	
1985	Pudhu Yugam	No	No	Yes	Credited as Shoba Sekhar
1985	Neethiyin Marupakkam	No	Story	Yes	
1986	Enakku Nane Needipathi	No	Story	No	
1986	Vasantha Raagam	No	No	Yes	
1987	Neethikku Thandanai	No	No	Yes	
1987	Sattam Oru Vilayaattu	No	No	Yes	
1987	Kudrat Ka Kanoon	No	Story	No	Hindi remake of Neethikku Thandanai; story originally written by M. Karunanidhi
1988	Sudhanthira Naattin Adimaigal	No	Story	No	
1989	Rajanadai	No	Story	Yes	
1991	Nanbargal	Yes	Yes	No	
1992	Innisai Mazhai	Yes	Story	No	
1992	Naalaiya Theerpu	No	Story	Yes	
1993	Senthoorapandi	No	Story	No	
1994	Rasigan	No	Story	No	
1995	Deva	No	Story	No	
1995	Vishnu	No	Story	No	
1996	Maanbumigu Maanavan	No	Story	No	
1998	Nilaave Vaa	No	No	Yes	
2006	Aathi	No	No	Yes	
2006	Nenjirukkum Varai	No	Story	No	
2008	Pandhayam	No	No	Yes	
2015	Touring Talkies	No	No	Yes	

== As a playback singer ==
Year	Title	Song(s)	Composer	Co-singer(s)	Ref.
1967	Iru Malargal	"Maharaja Oru Maharani"	M. S. Viswanathan	Sadan, T. M. Soundararajan	
1978	Aval Oru Pachai Kuzhanthai	"Maalai Ila Manathil"	Illayaraja	S. N. Surendar	
1979	Allari Vayasu (Telugu)	"Paapam Ee Chinnavaadikoka Lokam"	J. V. Raghavulu	G. Anand	
1985	Neethiyin Marupakkam	"Potti Kadaiyile"	Illayaraaja	Illayaraja	
1986	Kodai Mazhai	"Pala Pala Kuruvi"	Illayaraaja	Uma Ramanan	
1986	Natpu	"Adi Maadi Veettu"	Illayaraaja	P. Jayachandran	
1992	Innisai Mazhai	"Dhoori Dhoori"	Illayaraaja	S. P. Balasubrahmanyam	
1993	Kattalai	"Nambinen Maharajene"	Illayaraaja	Mano	
1994	Rasigan	"Love Love Mama"	Deva	S. P. Balasubrahmanyam	
1995	Vishnu	"Dhoddabetta"	Deva	Vijay	
1997	Once More	"Oormila Oormila"	Deva	Vijay	
2005	Sivakasi	"Kodambakkam Area"	Srikanth Deva	Tippu	
2006	Nenjirukkum Varai	"Azhagana Ponnu"	Srikanth Deva	Gopal Sharma	
2007	Mudhal Kanave	"Beeru Venuma Brandy Venuma"	Srikanth Deva	Vikranth	
2008	Pandhayam	"Chinnamamiye"	Vijay Antony	MK Balaji, Vinaya, Christopher	
2009	Vettaikaaran	"Uchimandai Surrru"	Vijay Antony	Krishna Iyer, Charulatha Mani, Shakthisree Gopalan	
2010	Veluthu Kattu	"Sangili Pungili"	Bharani	Karthik, Rap Valla	
2010	Sura	"Naan Nadanthal Adhiradi"	Mani Sharma	Naveen, Janani Madhan	
