= S. A. Chandrasekhar =

Indian film director and actor (born 1945)

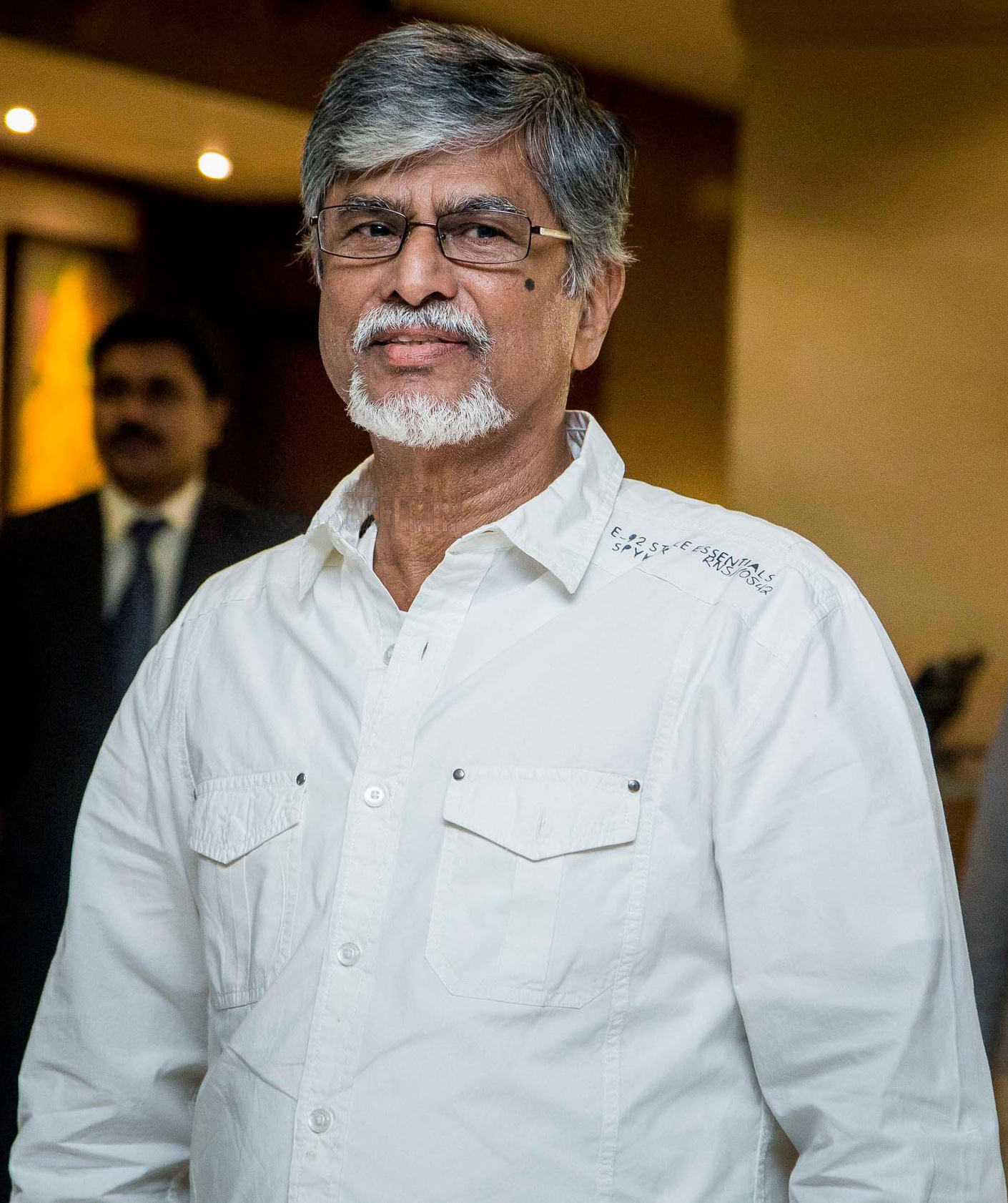
- Chandrasekhar at Kanithan audio launch
- Born: Senapathy Albert Chandrasekaran; 2 July 1945 (age 81); Thangachimadam, Madras Presidency, British India
- Other name: S. A. Chandrasekhar
- Occupations: Film director; Film producer; Screenwriter; Actor
- Years active: 1978–2025
- Spouse: Shoba Chandrasekhar
- Children: 2 (Note: One is deceased.) including C. Joseph Vijay
- Relatives: Vikranth (nephew); S. N. Surendar (brother-in-law)

Senapathy Albert Chandrasekaran, (born 2 July 1945), popularly known as S. A. Chandrasekhar, is an Indian film director, producer, screenwriter and actor who primarily works in Tamil cinema along with some Telugu, Kannada and Hindi films. He made his directorial debut with Aval Oru Pachai Kuzhanthai (1978) and got his breakthrough with Sattam Oru Iruttarai (1981). He has directed over 70 movies in all south Indian languages and is known for directing films focusing on social issues. He is the father of the ninth and incumbent Chief Minister of Tamil Nadu, C. Joseph Vijay.

== Personal life ==
Chandrasekar was born in Thangachimadam, Tamil Nadu into a Catholic Christian family as S. A. Chandrasekaran. His son is Joseph Vijay, who is a former actor and politician and currently serves as the Chief Minister of Tamil Nadu. Chandrasekhar also had a daughter named Vidya, who died at the age of two. His brother-in-law S. N. Surendar is a playback singer and voice artist. His nephew Vikranth is also an actor, and his grandson Jason Sanjay is a director who made his debut with Sigma (2026).

== Film career ==
=== Directing ===
Chandrasekar has directed over 70 movies in Tamil, Telugu, Kannada and Hindi. Directors S. Shankar, Senthilnathan, C. Ranganathan, Pavithran, Majith, K. R. Jaya, M. Rajesh, Ponram, T. Shivraj, and Vicky had worked with him as assistants.

Some of his hit movies include Sattam Oru Iruttarai (1981), Chattaniki Kallu Levu (1981), Nyaya Ellide (1982), Palletoori Monagadu (1983), Saatchi (1983), Vetri (1984), Naan Sigappu Manithan (1985), Sattam Oru Vilayaattu (1987), Senthoorapandi (1993), Rasigan (1994), Deva (1995), Once More (1997), and Nenjirukkum Varai (2006).

He introduced his son Vijay and directed several films in his formative years such as Naalaiya Theerpu (1992), Senthoorapandi (1993), Rasigan (1994), Deva (1995), and Vishnu (1995). Most of his movies are with Vijayakanth or Vijay.

He also directed Telugu movies such as Chattaniki Kallu Levu (1981) and Palletoori Monagadu (1983) with Chiranjeevi. In 2019, he directed his 70th film, Capmaari.

=== Acting ===
Chandrasekhar has appeared in supporting roles in movies such as Kudumbam (1984), Pudhu Yugam (1985), Naan Sigappu Manithan (1985), Neethiyin Marupakkam (1985), Enakku Nane Needipathi (1986), Nilave Malare (1986), Vasantha Raagam (1986), Neethikku Thandanai (1987), Sattam Oru Vilayaattu (1987), Innisai Mazhai (1992), Deva (1995), Priyamudan (1998), Sukran (2005) and Kodi (2016).

Chandrasekhar played the lead role in the film Touring Talkies (2015). He acted in Traffic Ramasamy (2018), a biopic about the eponymous activist, and played the title role.

Chandrashekhar acted in Kooran (2025) as his last film.

=== Other work ===
In the early 2000s, Chandrasekhar slowed down his work as a director and focused on business interests, including on the construction of a three star hotel for his son. In 2000, he began pre-production work on a film titled Dhoosi with Sarathkumar but the project was later shelved.

== Controversies ==
In 2018, Chandrasekhar spoke at the music launch of the movie Visiri at Vadapalani Prasad Lab, Chennai. He allegedly said "offering at Tirupati Hundiyal was like a bribe to the deity and one cannot pass the exam by simply making offering to a deity. If the offering to deity can help you pass the exams, you don't need to write the exams and sit at home". He also said that "success can be achieved only by studying." Virugambakkam police registered a FIR against Chandrasekhar on charges of hurting religious beliefs after a complaint filed by Hindu Munnani over his statements.

== Filmography ==
=== As a director ===
- Note: he is mostly credited as S. A. Chandrasekaran. For many of his older films, his name was absent from the film credits and only present on promotional media

Year	Film	Language	Notes			
Year	Film	Language	Notes	1978	Aval Oru Pachai Kuzhandhai	Tamil
1981	Sattam Oru Iruttarai					Tamil
1981	Nenjile Thunivirunthal					Tamil
1981	Chattaniki Kallu Levu	Telugu	Remake of Sattam Oru Iruttarai			
1981	Needhi Pizhaithadhu	Tamil				
1982	Idhayam Pesugirathu	Tamil				
1982	Pattanathu Rajakkal	Tamil				
1982	Om Shakti	Tamil				
1982	Nyaya Ellide	Kannada	Remake of Sattam Oru Iruttarai			
1983	Balidaanam	Telugu				
1983	Samsaram Enbathu Veenai	Tamil				
1983	Palletoori Monagadu	Telugu	Remake of Nenjile Thunivirunthal			
1983	Gedda Maga	Kannada	Remake of Moondru Mugam			
1983	Geluvu Nannade	Kannada				
1983	Saatchi	Tamil				
1983	Hasida Hebbuli	Kannada	Remake of Nenjile Thunivirunthal			
1983	Simha Gharjane	Kannada				
1984	Dopidi Dongalu	Telugu				
1984	Vetri	Tamil	Remakes of Kannada film Geluvu Nannade			
1984	Devanthakudu	Telugu	Remakes of Kannada film Geluvu Nannade			
1984	Veetuku Oru Kannagi	Tamil				
1984	Kudumbam	Tamil				
1985	Pudhu Yugam	Tamil				
1985	Intiko Rudramma	Telugu				
1985	Naan Sigappu Manithan	Tamil				
1985	Balidaan	Hindi				
1985	Neethiyin Marupakkam	Tamil				
1986	En Sabatham	Tamil				
1986	Nilave Malare	Tamil				
1986	Enakku Nane Needipathi	Tamil				
1986	Vasantha Raagam	Tamil				
1986	Sigappu Malargal	Tamil				
1987	Neethikku Thandanai	Tamil				
1987	Sattam Oru Vilayaattu	Tamil				
1987	Kudrat Ka Kanoon	Hindi	Remake of Neethikku Thandanai			
1988	Sudhanthira Naattin Adimaigal	Tamil				
1988	Poovum Puyalum	Tamil				
1988	Ithu Engal Neethi	Tamil				
1989	Rajanadai	Tamil				
1990	Azaad Desh Ke Gulam	Hindi	Remake of Sudhanthira Naattin Adimaigal			
1990	Seetha	Tamil				
1992	Insaaf Ki Devi	Hindi				
1992	Mera Dil Tere Liye	Hindi				
1992	Naalaiya Theerpu	Tamil				
1993	Jeevan Ki Shatranj	Hindi	Remake of Rajanadai			
1993	Rajadurai	Tamil				
1993	Senthoorapandi	Tamil				
1994	Rasigan	Tamil				
1995	Deva	Tamil				
1995	Vishnu	Tamil				
1996	Maanbumigu Maanavan	Tamil				
1997	Once More	Tamil				
1999	Perianna	Tamil				
1999	Nenjinile	Tamil				
2001	Dosth	Tamil				
2002	Mutham	Tamil	Spoke poems in the song "Oru Murai Nee"			
2005	Sukran	Tamil				
2006	Nenjirukkum Varai	Tamil				
2008	Pandhayam	Tamil				
2011	Sattapadi Kutram	Tamil				
2015	Touring Talkies	Tamil				
2019	Capmaari	Tamil				
2023	Naan Kadavul Illai	Tamil	Also singer for song "Kanne Kanmaniye"			

=== As a producer ===
Year	Title	Notes
1984	Veetuku Oru Kannagi	
1999	Nenjinile	
2005	Sukran	
2006	Aathi	
2010	Veluthu Kattu	
2011	Sattapadi Kutram	
2016	Nayyapudai	Also assistant director
2018	Traffic Ramasamy	

=== As a screenwriter ===
Year	Film	Notes			
Year	Film	Notes	1992	Innisai Mazhai	Uncredited
2002	Thamizhan				
2025	Kooran	Also dialogue writer			

=== As an actor ===
Year	Film	Role	Notes
1977	Olimayamana Ethirkalam		First film
1981	Sattam Oru Iruttarai	Hitchhiker	
1984	Kudumbam	Sekhar	
1985	Pudhu Yugam		
1985	Naan Sigappu Manithan	Hospital Ward Boy	
1986	Enakku Nane Needipathi	Advocate Chandrasekhar	
1986	Vasantha Raagam	Chandrasekhar	
1987	Sattam Oru Vilayaattu	Peter	
1992	Innisai Mazhai	Police officer	
1993	Senthoorapandi		Guest appearance in song "Aadada Aadada"
1994	Rasigan		Guest appearance in song "Thambi Konjam"
1995	Deva	Marimuthu	
1998	Priyamudan	CBI officer Gopal	
2005	Sukran	Himself	Guest appearance
2015	Touring Talkies	Anthony	Anthology film; segment Love @ 75
2016	Nayyapudai	Vellaichamy	
2016	Kodi	Thalaivar	
2018	Traffic Ramasamy	Traffic Ramasamy	
2018	Aaruthra	Shiva's father	
2019	Capmaari	Police Inspector	
2021	Maanaadu	Arivazhagan	
2023	Tamil Kudimagan	Chinnasamy's advocate	
2023	Naan Kadavul Illai		
2023	Karumegangal Kalaigindrana	Ramanathan's friend	
2025	Kooran	Dharmaraj	Final film

== Television ==
Year	Title	Role	Channel	Language
2023–2024	Kizhakku Vaasal	Swamiappan	Star Vijay	Tamil
