= List of Tamil films of 1997 =

Post-amendment to the Tamil Nadu Entertainments Tax Act 1939 on 1 April 1958, Gross jumped to 140 per cent of Nett Commercial Taxes Department disclosed ₹108 crore in entertainment tax revenue for the year.

A list of films produced in the Tamil film industry in India in 1997 by release date.

== List of released films ==
=== January — March ===
Opening		Title	Director	Cast	Studio	Ref
J A N	10	Sakthi	R. Raghu Raj	Vineeth, Yuvarani	Gentleman Film International	
J A N	14	Dharma Chakkaram	K. S. Ravikumar	Vijayakanth, Deepti Bhatnagar, Rambha	Lakshmi Movie Makers	
J A N	14	Iruvar	Mani Ratnam	Mohanlal, Aishwarya Rai, Prakash Raj, Gouthami, Revathi, Tabu	Madras Talkies	
J A N	14	Kaalamellam Kaathiruppen	R. Sundarrajan	Vijay, Dimple	M. G. Pictures	
J A N	14	Kathirunda Kadhal	Vijeshwaran	Arun Vijay, Suvalakshmi	Ganga Gowri Productions	
J A N	14	Minsara Kanavu	Rajiv Menon	Arvind Swamy, Prabhu Deva, Kajol	AVM Productions	
J A N	14	Nalla Manasukkaran	Jayarajendran	Pandiarajan, Jayaragini	Annai Sree Baalaambikai Creations	
J A N	14	Om Saravana Bhava	N. Krishnaswamy	Sowmyan, Vidyasri		
J A N	14	Periya Thambi	Chitra Lakshmanan	Prabhu, Nagma	Gayathri Films	
J A N	15	Bharathi Kannamma	Cheran	R. Parthiban, Meena	Pangaj Productions	
J A N	15	Gopura Deepam	Ramarajan	Ramarajan, Sukanya	Kashtoori Films International	
J A N	15	Nesam	K. Subash	Ajith Kumar, Maheswari	Dhanooja Films	
J A N	30	Pudhayal	Selva	Mammooty, Arvind Swamy, Aamani, Sakshi Shivanand	Cheran Cine Makers	
F E B	12	Kaalamellam Kadhal Vaazhga	R. Balu	Murali, Kausalya	Sivasakthi Movie Makers	
F E B	14	Ettupatti Rasa	Kasthuri Raja	Napoleon, Khushbu, Urvashi	Pyramid Films International	
F E B	14	Parama Pithaa	K. Alexander	Nizhalgal Ravi, Vijaya		
F E B	14	Vaimaye Vellum	P. Vasu	R. Parthiban, Rachana Banerjee	S. B. Films	
F E B	21	Mannava	L. M. Balaji	Prashanth, Sanghavi, Urvashi	Star Movies	
F E B	21	Maradha Uravu	Thiruvarangan	Rajiv, Rajam		
F E B	28	Adhipathi	Balaraja	Varunraj, Apsara		
F E B	28	Aravindhan	T. Nagarajan	Sarath Kumar, R. Parthiban, Nagma	Amma Creations	
F E B	28	Mappillai Gounder	Manivasagam	Prabhu, Sakshi Shivanand, Swathi	Janaki Films	
M A R	6	Vivasaayi Magan	Ramarajan	Ramarajan, Devayani	Mahalakshmi International	

=== April — June ===
Opening		Title	Director	Cast	Studio	Ref
A P R	10	Arunachalam	Sundar C	Rajinikanth, Soundarya, Rambha, Visu	Annamalai Cine Combines	
A P R	10	Thaali Pudhusu	Keyar	Ramki, Khushbu	Perumal Productions	
A P R	14	Dhinamum Ennai Gavani	A. R. Ramesh	Ramki, Sanghavi	Tamilannai Cine Creations	
A P R	14	My India	K. Alex Pandian	Shihan Hussaini, Vani Viswanath, Swathi	Deivaanai Movies	
A P R	14	Raasi	Muraliappas	Ajith Kumar, Rambha, Prakash Raj	NIC Arts	
A P R	19	Vallal	Rajkapoor	Sathyaraj, Meena, Roja, Sangeetha, Goundamani, Senthil	Raaj Films International	
A P R	27	Sishya	Selva	Karthik, Roshini	Tharangai V. Sunder	
M A Y	9	Adimai Changili	R. K. Selvamani	Arjun, Roja, Rambha	Sai Roja Companies	
M A Y	9	Love Today	Balasekaran	Vijay, Suvalakshmi, Manthra	Super Good Films	
M A Y	9	Pistha	K. S. Ravikumar	Karthik, Nagma	Pyramid Films International	
M A Y	9	Pongalo Pongal	V. Sekhar	Vignesh, Sangeetha, Vadivelu, Vivek	Thiruvalluvar Kalaikoodam	
M A Y	23	Ullaasam	J. D.–Jerry	Ajith Kumar, Vikram, Maheswari	Amitabh Bachchan Corporation	
J U N	6	Pasamulla Pandiyare	T. P. Gajendran	Rajkiran, Meena, Roja	Meenakshi Arts	
J U N	27	Devathai	Nassar	Nassar, Vineeth, Keerthi Reddy	Indus Film Factory	
J U N	27	Suryavamsam	Vikraman	Sarath Kumar, Devayani, Radhika, Priya Raman	R. B. Choudary	

=== July — September ===
Opening		Title	Director	Cast	Studio	Ref
J U L	4	Nattupura Nayagan	Rama Narayanan	Selva, Swathi, Timea	Karumari Movies	
J U L	4	Once More	S. A. Chandrasekhar	Sivaji Ganesan, Vijay, Simran, Saroja Devi, Anju Aravind	Shree Ganesh Vision	
J U L	4	V. I. P	D. Sabhapathi	Prabhu Deva, Abbas, Simran, Rambha	Kalaipuli S. Dhanu	
J U L	11	Nandhini	Manobala	Prakash Raj, Suhasini, Keerthi Reddy	V. Natarajan	
J U L	25	Kaadhali	Sidhu	Vignesh, Devayani	Tara Creations	
A U G	1	Pagaivan	Ramesh Balakrishnan	Ajith Kumar, Sathyaraj, Anjala Zhaveri	Viswas Films	
A U G	15	Anubhavam Pudhumai	S. Raj	Venki, Jothy	T. V. Productions	
A U G	15	Kadhal Palli	Pavithran	Vignesh, Suvalakshmi	N. R. D. Film Circuit	
A U G	15	Sathi Sanam	Jayaprakash	Mahesh, Ovia	Chozha Creations	
A U G	22	Periya Idathu Mappillai	Guru Dhanapal	Jayaram, Devayani, Manthra	Murugan Movies	
A U G	22	Raman Abdullah	Balu Mahendra	Sivakumar, Vignesh, Karan, Eshwari Rao, Rudra	Anand Cine Arts	
S E P	5	Abhimanyu	K. Subash	R. Parthiban, Ravali	Sree Charan Films	
S E P	5	Kalyana Vaibhogam	N. Rathnam	Ramki, Khushbu, Sangita	Gomathi Shankar Films	
S E P	5	Nerrukku Ner	Vasanth	Vijay, Suriya, Simran, Kausalya	Madras Talkies	
S E P	12	Adrasakkai Adrasakkai	V. C. Guhanathan	Pandiarajan, Sangita, Anusha	Victory Movies	
S E P	12	Ganga Gowri	Madheswaran	Arun Kumar, Sangeetha, Manthra	Ganga Gowri Production	
S E P	12	Naalaya Udhayam	K. R. Ranjith	K. R. Ranjith, Rani Chitra		
S E P	19	Aahaa Enna Porutham	C. Ranganathan	Ramki, Sanghavi	K.B Films	
S E P	26	Paththini	P. Vasu	Jayaram, Khushbu	Good Luck Films	

=== October — December ===
Opening		Title	Director	Cast	Studio	Ref
O C T	10	Samrat	C. Dinakaran	Ramki, Vineetha, Rukma	Lakshmikaran Enterprises	
O C T	30	Aahaa..!	Suresh Krishna	Rajiv Krishna, Sulekha	Shogun Films	
O C T	30	Periya Manushan	Guru Dhanapal	Sathyaraj, Ravali	Guru Film International	
O C T	30	Porkkaalam	Cheran	Murali, Meena, Sanghavi, Manivannan, Vadivelu	Roja Combines	
O C T	30	Ratchagan	Praveen Kanth	Nagarjuna, Sushmita Sen, Girish Karnad, Raghuvaran	Gentleman Films	
O C T	30	Thedinen Vanthathu	Ravi Varma	Prabhu, Manthra, Goundamani	Shiva Shree Pictures	
O C T	30	Themmangu Paattukaaran	Gangai Amaren	Ramarajan, Aamani	Sree Devi Bahavathy Films	
O C T	30	Vasuke	Kasthuri Raja	Rajendra Prasad, Urvashi	Anand Movie Land	
O C T	30	Vidukadhai	Agathiyan	Prakash Raj, Neena	Kavithalayaa Productions	
O C T	31	Janakiraman	Sundar C	Sarath Kumar, Nagma, Rambha, Goundamani, Senthil	Malar Films	
N O V	28	Thadayam	Ramesh Balakrishnan	Ramki, Vijayashanti, Indraja	Maruthi Movie Makers	
N O V	28	Veerapandi Kottayiley	Chandernath	Ramji, Maina		
D E C	5	Kadavul	Velu Prabhakaran	Velu Prabhakaran, Arun Pandian, Roja	Deccan Pictures	
D E C	5	Roja Malare	Jayamurugan	Murali, Riva Bubber, Arun Pandian	Kamalam Movies	
D E C	5	Thambi Durai	Senthilnathan	Saravanan, Sukanya	Sree Maariamman Films	
D E C	12	Arasiyal	R. K. Selvamani	Mammootty, Shilpa Shirodkar, Roja	Motherland Movies Internationals	
D E C	12	Poochudava	Udayasankar	Abbas, Simran		
D E C	12	Rettai Jadai Vayasu	C. Sivakumar	Ajith Kumar, Manthra	Bhagyam Cine Combines	
D E C	19	Kadhalukku Mariyadhai	Fazil	Vijay, Shalini, Sivakumar, Srividya, KPAC Lalitha	Murugan Cine Arts	
D E C	26	Pudhalvan	Selva Vinayagam	Ramki, Pragathi, Vijayakumar	P. N. R. Pictures	

== Awards ==
Category/Organization	Cinema Express Awards 23 August 1998	Dinakaran Cinema Awards 12 April 1998	Filmfare Awards South August 1998	Tamil Nadu State Film Awards 27 November 1998
Best Film	Suryavamsam	Suryavamsam	Bharathi Kannamma	Arunachalam / Suryavamsam
Best Director	Vikraman; Suryavamsam	Cheran; Porkkaalam	Cheran; Bharathi Kannamma	Cheran / Vikraman; Porkkaalam / Suryavamsam
Best Actor	Sarathkumar; Suryavamsam	Sarathkumar; Suryavamsam	Sarathkumar; Suryavamsam	Parthiban / Vijay; Bharathi Kannamma / Kadhalukku Mariyadhai
Best Actress	Meena; Bharathi Kannamma	Devayani; Suryavamsam	Meena; Bharathi Kannamma	Meena / Devayani; Porkkaalam / Suryavamsam
Best Music Director	S. A. Rajkumar; Suryavamsam	A. R. Rahman; Minsara Kanavu	A. R. Rahman; Minsara Kanavu	S. A. Rajkumar; Suryavamsam
