= Thee Ivan =

2023 film directed by Jayamurugan Muthusamy

- Poster
- Directed by: Jayamurugan Muthusamy
- Written by: Jayamurugan Muthusamy
- Produced by: Jayamurugan Muthusamy
- Starring: Karthik; Sukanya
- Music by: Jayamurugan Muthusamy
- Production company: Manithan Cine Arts
- Release date: 8 December 2023
- Running time: 177 minutes
- Country: India
- Language: Tamil

Thee Ivan (transl. He is fire) is a 2023 Indian Tamil-language crime drama film written, produced and directed by Jayamurugan Muthusamy. The film stars Karthik and Sukanya in the main lead roles. The film marked the return of Karthik in the main lead role, after a long gap.

== Cast ==
- Karthik as Muthusamy
- Sukanya as Lakshmi
- Suman Jayamurugan as Muthukutty
- Sunny Leone in a special appearance
- Abitha
- Radha Ravi
- Ilavarasu as Senathipathy
- John Vijay as Minor
- Singampuli as Vinayagam
- Yuvarani

== Production ==
The film project was announced by T. M. Jayamurugan which marked his comeback return as film director and it also marked his third directorial venture after Roja Malare (1997) and Adada Enna Azhagu (2009). He also composed music for the film and also penned lyrics for the songs while also writing the screenplay and dialogues for the film.

Karthik was chosen to play the main male lead role after a long break from doing masala films. Karthik played supporting roles in films including Anegan (2015) and Thaanaa Serndha Koottam (2018) prior to this film project, as he was seen in only a handful of films here and there in the 2010s. It was reported that Karthik very much liked the script and storyline of the film, and he agreed to commit his time for the film to go on floors despite him being busy full-time with his political commitments.

The film was set in Coimbatore. The filmmakers chose Sunny Leone for an item number in a dance sequence opposite to Karthik and the shooting of the song reportedly began on 15 November 2023 in Chennai.

== Soundtrack ==
No.	Title	Singer(s)	Length
1.	"Rightum Oduthu"	AJ Alimirzaq	03:26
2.	"Mela Agayam"	Amith & Vinithra	04:25
3.	"Attu Kutti"	Sai Vignesh	03:58
4.	"Kattukkullae"	Velan & Padmalatha	03:56
5.	"Iravum Pakalum"	Sai Vignesh & Padmalatha	03:27
6.	"Kalilae Salangi"	Senthil & Rajalakshmi	03:46
7.	"Vaikaporu Pathikichu"	Amith & Vinithra	03:51
8.	"Maname"	AJ Alimirzaq	01:28
9.	"Enga Solli Ketpathu"	Saindhavi

== Reception ==
Maalai Malar stated that Karthik gave a befitting performance for the role of the father. Times Now rated three out of five and stated, "The director, Jayamurugan Muthusamy, skillfully crafts the film's pacing, allowing the audience to empathise with the protagonist's struggles and triumphs."
