= Selvaa =

Selvaa may refer to:

- Selvaa (director)
- Selvaa (film)
