= Madhuchandralekha =

- Directed by: Rajasenan
- Written by: Raghunath Paleri
- Produced by: Samad Mangada
- Starring: Jayaram; Urvashi; Mamta Mohandas
- Cinematography: K. P. Nambiathiri
- Edited by: Raja Muhammed
- Music by: M. Jayachandran
- Release date: 24 March 2006
- Country: India
- Language: Malayalam

Madhuchandralekha is a 2006 Indian Malayalam-language comedy-drama film directed by Rajasenan and written by Raghunath Paleri. It stars Jayaram, Urvashi, and Mamta Mohandas in the title roles as Madhu, Chandramathi, and Indulekha, respectively. The music was composed by M. Jayachandran. The film is a remake of the Korean film My Wife. This is the 15th film in which Rajasenan and Jayaram have worked together. Madhuchandralekha was a success at the box office.

== Plot ==
Madhu aka Madhavan is a successful playback singer. Chandramathi is his illiterate, rustic, coarse, betel chewing wife with a habit of spitting in inappropriate places. They have four children. She has a clutch of equally coarse brothers and grandma. Theirs was an incompatible matrimony but still a happy one. She had in fact fallen in love with her music teacher, Madhavan, and one day, Chandramathi kissed him in public and that incident forced him to marry her. Even though they are out of sync, Madhu loves his wife because she has brought him luck. Madhavan and the kids tolerate her, as she even spits betel juice accidentally on others and is known in party circles as "kolambi".

Enters Lekha, a sophisticated urban model-cum-singer, an ardent lover of Madhu's music, who finds a place in the hearts of all the family members. The kids start to avoid Chandramathi as they want a stylish mummy, like Lekha. Chandra is aware of their incompatibility in the changed scenario, and attempts to improve, even trying her hand at learning English. At last, Chandramathi thinks Lekha will be the perfect wife for her husband and a good mother for her children. To unite Madhu and Lekha, she leaves home with her younger child, Kingini. This incident totally changes Madhu's life.

Chandramathi moves to her uncle's home. Even though in the end she cannot tolerate the pain of giving her husband to another woman. With the help of Chandramathi's uncle, Madhu and Lekha plan to take her back to the children and Madhu. In the end, she enters Madhu and Lekha's wedding ceremony and cries off. It is revealed that everything was based on a plan and Madhu loves his wife a lot. Finally, he marries Chandramathi once again.

== Cast ==
- Jayaram as Madhavan aka Madhu
- Urvashi as Chandramathi
- Mamta as Indulekha
- Cochin Haneefa as Abootty
- Indrans as Lukose
- Sudheer Sukumaran as Rishi
- Harisree Asokan as Chidambaram
- Kundara Johny as Shanmugham
- Bheeman Raghu as Arumugham
- Sukumari as Chandramathi's grandmother
- Kalasala Babu as Ramu
- Vijayakumari as Chandramathi's mother
- Anslal K A as running child 4

== Awards ==
Kerala State Film Award

- Best Actress- Urvashi

== Soundtrack ==
The film's soundtrack contains 7 songs, all composed by M. Jayachandran. Lyrics by Gireesh Puthenchery and Kanesh Punoor.

#	Title	Singer(s)
1	"Chakkani Raaja"	Sankaran Namboothiri
2	"Kusumavadana"	Kavalam Sreekumar, Chithra Iyer, Saraswathy Shankar
3	"Mallikappoo"	K. J. Yesudas
4	"Manassil Viriyunna (F)"	Sujatha Mohan
5	"Manassil Viriyunna (M)"	K. J. Yesudas
6	"Sukhamano"	Afsal, Cicily
7	"Thullithulli"	Santhosh Keshav, Vijay Yesudas
