= Parrisu =

Indian Tamil-language drama film

- Theatrical release poster
- Directed by: Kala Alluri
- Produced by: Kala Alluri
- Starring: Jaanvekaa Subramaniam; Kiran Pradeep; Jai Bala
- Cinematography: Sankar Selvaraj
- Edited by: Prem; Ram Gopi
- Music by: Rajeesh K
- Production company: Sri Kala Creationss
- Release date: 7 November 2025
- Country: India
- Language: Tamil

Parrisu (transl. Gift) is a 2025 Indian Tamil-language drama film directed by Kala Alluri and produced by Kala Alluri.The film stars Jaanvekaa Subramaniam, Kiran Pradeep and Jai Bala in the lead roles.

== Cast ==
- Jaanvekaa Subramaniam
- Kiran Pradeep
- Jai Bala
- Sachu
- Aadukalam Naren
- Pei Krishnan
- Sendrayan
- Manobala
- Chinnaponnu
- Sudhakar
- Rajasekhar

== Reception ==
Dinakaran wrote that Janhvika has done justice to her character in the guises of a college student, a farmer, and a soldier; she has performed bravely in the fight scenes. Maalai Malar stated that the director has said that the greatest gift one can give to parents is to fulfill their dreams.
