= Bagavathi =

2002 Indian Tamil-language action film

- Theatrical release poster
- Directed by: A. Venkatesh
- Written by: Pattukkottai Prabakar (Dialogues)
- Screenplay by: A. Venkatesh
- Story by: A. Venkatesh
- Produced by: K. Muralidharan; V. Swaminathan; G. Venugopal
- Starring: Vijay; Reema Sen
- Cinematography: R. Rathnavelu
- Edited by: V. T. Vijayan
- Music by: Deva
- Production companies: Lakshmi Movie Makers; Kalasangham Films
- Release date: 4 November 2002
- Running time: 164 minutes
- Country: India
- Language: Tamil

Bagavathi is a 2002 Indian Tamil-language gangster action film written and directed by A. Venkatesh, starring Vijay and Reema Sen. Jai (in his film debut), Vadivelu, Ashish Vidyarthi, K. Viswanath and Yugendran play supporting roles, while Deva composed the music for the film.

Bagavathi was released on 4 November 2002 during Diwali and was a failure. It was remade in Kannada as Kashi from Village (2005).

== Plot ==
Bagavathi owns a tea shop, where Vadivelu works. Bagavathi lives with his younger brother Guna. He meets a girl named Anjali who ends up appreciating his kindness, and they fall in love. Guna has a girlfriend named Priya, with whom he has a secret physical relationship. Priya's father, Easwarapandiyan, objects to Guna and Priya's relationship. Bagavathi tries to convince Easwarapandiyan to let Priya and Guna marry, but is humiliated. With his brother's help, Guna attempts to marry Priya, but Easwarapandiyan kills Guna and Bagavathi's friend Anand, who tries to defend him, as well as Bagavathi's friend Anand, who tries to defend Guna.

Bagavathi mourns over Guna's death. Guna, in his last moments, promises he will be with his brother forever. After Guna's death, everyone realises that Priya is pregnant. Bagavathi thinks that Guna will be reborn. However, Easwarapandiyan attempts to kill the child before birth. Bagavathi challenges him, saying the child will touch the earth. To do so, Ganga helps him turn into a gangster. With the help of Anjali and Vadivelu, Bagavathi overcomes all hurdles created by Easwarapandiyan and manages to protect Priya to allow for the safe birth of his brother's child. Guna's child is born. In the climax, Bagavathi avenges the death of his brother by killing Easwarapandian. And Guna's child has grown up safely.

== Cast ==
- Vijay as Bagavathi
- Reema Sen as Anjali
- Jai as Guna, Bagavathi's brother
- Monica as Priya
- Vadivelu as Vadivelu and Vibration
- Ashish Vidyarthi as Easwarapandiyan MA LLB (Member of Parliament), Priya's father
- K. Vishwanath as Chief Minister
- Yugendran as Anand, Childhood friend of Bagavathi
- Thalaivasal Vijay as Ganga
- Vimalraj as Henchman
- Ponnambalam as Vibuthi Ganesan
- Ilavarasu as Singamuthu MP
- Seema as District Judge, Anjali's mother
- Sathyapriya as Priya's mother
- Kottachi as Bagavathi's employee
- Singamuthu as Nattamai
- Benjamin as Perumal
- Citizen Mani as Cyclist
- Bayilvan Ranganathan as Traffic Police officer
- Chelladurai as Vegetable seller
- Vellai Subbaiah as Villager

Uncredited

- V. Swaminathan (special appearance)
- Vasanthi (special appearance in "Allu Allu")
- Japan Kumar (special appearance in "Podango")

== Production ==
Lakshmi Movie Makers initially started the project Unnai Ninaithu with Vijay directed by Vikraman; however Vijay left that film due to creative differences, with Suriya replacing him and the production company instead started a new project Bhagavathi with A. Venkatesh directing. Venkatesh selected a newcomer, Jai, to play the role of Guna after seeing him at Jai's uncle, Deva's, recording studio, noting Jai's resemblance to Vijay. The film was shot at various locations including Chennai, Nellore, Araku Valley, Vishakhapatnam with two songs picturised at Sydney, Australia. Prior to the title being confirmed as Bagavathi, the maker considered the title Namma Aalu.

== Soundtrack ==
The soundtrack consists of six songs composed by Deva. Deva composed twelve tunes out of which the film's director chose six tunes. The song "Allu Allu" is based on "Nari Narain" by Egyptian singer Hisham Abbas. The song "Kai.. Kai.." is based on "Raanu Raanu" from the Telugu film Jayam.

Track listing
No.	Title	Lyrics	Singer(s)	Length
1.	"July Malargale"	Pa. Vijay	Karthik, Sadhana Sargam	4:45
2.	"Achamillai"	Snehan	Shankar Mahadevan	3:43
3.	"Kai... Kai.."	Kalai Kumar	Shankar Mahadevan, Anuradha Sriram	4:19
4.	"Saiyo Saiyo"	Na. Muthukumar	Timmi, Sadhana Sargam	5:23
5.	"Allu Allu"	Vaali	Udit Narayan	5:20
6.	"Coca Cola (Podango Podango)"	Kalai Kumar	Vadivelu, Vijay	4:19
Total length:				27:49

== Release and reception ==
Bagavathi was released in Diwali alongside Ajith Kumar starrer Villain. The film was released in Malaysia under the title Pasupathy. Ananda Vikatan rated the film 37 out of 100. Malathi Rangarajan of The Hindu wrote "The film that seemed to move at an interesting pace makes a nosedive in the climax [..]". Deccan Herald wrote "The film lacks a storyline and turns out to be a dull affair after the second half with the director focussing more on the main character instead of the script". Indiainfo wrote, "The film starts off well but ends in a very predictable manner. That's the major itch. The film could have been better if Venkatesh focused on screenplay". Cinesouth wrote "Vijay's affection for his younger brother and Vadivelu's comedy are the two things that save the film. Otherwise, the film has all the ingredients that his recent half baked films had".
