= Naai Kutty =

- Film poster
- Directed by: Sathaji
- Written by: Sathaji
- Produced by: V. A. Durai
- Starring: Selvin; Nicole
- Cinematography: C. H. Prasath
- Edited by: K. Thanikachalam
- Music by: Vijayabharathi
- Production company: Evergreen Movie International
- Release date: 31 December 2009
- Running time: 125 minutes
- Country: India
- Language: Tamil

Naai Kutty (transl. Puppy) is a 2009 Indian Tamil-language drama film written and directed by Sathaji and produced by V. A. Durai. The film stars newcomer Selvin and Nicole, with Soori, Sippy, and Jayakumaran playing supporting roles. The film's music was composed by Vijayabharathi with cinematography by C. H. Prasath and editing by K. Thanikachalam. The film was released on 31 December 2009.

== Plot ==
In a slum in Chennai, Naai Kutty (Selvin), an orphan, is brought up by a cycle rickshaw puller. He spends his time drinking alcohol in the company of his friend Maari (Soori) and does not go for any work. Malli (Nicole) sells flowers in a temple near the slum, and she is in love with Naai Kutty, while her friend Ammu (Sippy) treats him like her brother. After the death of his adoptive father, Naai Kutty decides to ride his cycle rickshaw. He then comes into contact with prostitutes who use his rickshaw, and he gets paid handsomely for his service. Naai Kutty starts to carry prostitutes, and he eventually buys an auto rickshaw. One day, rowdies try to misbehave with the prostitutes in a brothel. Naai Kutty beats the rowdies up and saves the prostitutes. Impressed by his strength, Reddy (Jayakumaran), the kingpin of the flesh trade, hires Naai Kutty as his henchman.

One day, Ammu's father sells her to Reddy, Naai Kutty clashes with Reddy to save Ammu and quits his job in disgust. Later, he sells his auto rickshaw and buys a van to start a new life. In the meantime, Maari, who runs in the councillor election, begs Naai Kutty to lend him money for the election, but Naai Kutty refuses because he has run out of money. A vengeful Reddy hatches a conspiracy against Naai Kutty, and he convinces Maari to leave Malli to him. Malli is drugged and unconscious, and wealthy clients rape her in the brothel. Naai Kutty then meets Reddy, who gives him money to dispose of a body. At the cemetery, a drunk Naai Kutty discovers Malli's body and is in shock. The slum dwellers, who come across Naai Kutty, misunderstand the situation and beat him to death. The film ends with Ammu killing Maari for betraying Naai Kutty.

== Cast ==
- Selvin as Naai Kutty
- Nicole as Malli
- Soori as Maari
- Sippy as Ammu
- Jayakumaran as Reddy
- Editor Manivannan
- Auto Krishnamoorthy
- S. Vijayaraj
- T. Sivakumar
- Abdul Kader
- R. Keerthi
- Prathap
- Kalamalai Velmurugan
- Mano
- Santhosh
- Jakir
- Thambiran
- Bhagya Sri
- Easwari
- Shobana
- Umaraani
- Vani Sri as Prostitute
- Priya as Transgender
- Priyanga as Transgender
- Sashasri in a special appearance
- Sandy in a special appearance

== Production ==
The film was announced by V. A. Durai, producer of Pithamagan (2003) and Gajendra (2004), in mid-2008, where it was reported that S. S. Joe, an associate of Ram, would work on a film revolving a youth brought up in a Chennai slum. S. S. Joe was himself raised in the slums of Chennai and so he was expected to bring out the emotional and social plight of slum dwellers with reality as the strength. Prasanna and Nicole signed to play the lead roles while comedian Santhanam was approached to play a significant role and Sundar C. Babu was chosen to compose the music.

The film was inaugurated in Chennai on 24 September 2008 without the presence of S. S. Joe.

Subsequently, V. A. Durai restarted the project with a new script due to similarities with the Kannada film Nanda Loves Nanditha and Sathaji was chosen to direct the film whereas Kannada music director Vijayabharathi signed to compose the music. Newcomer Selvin signed on after Prasanna opted out of the role and Soori replaced Santhanam.

== Soundtrack ==
Naai Kutty

Soundtrack album by Vijayabharathi
- Released: 25 July 2009
- Recorded: 2009
- Genre: Feature film soundtrack
- Length: 24:52
- Label: Five Star Audio
- Producer: Vijayabharathi

The film score and the soundtrack were composed by Vijayabharathi. The soundtrack features 6 tracks, and it was released on 25 July 2009 by actor Silambarasan.

Tracklist
No.	Title	Lyrics	Singer(s)	Length
1.	"Uththirathil"	Sathaji	Madhu Balakrishnan	3:30
2.	"Adichi Potta"	Sathaji	Mukesh Mohamed	4:51
3.	"Eppo Partheno"	Viveka	K. S. Gandhi Kumar, Sangeetha	5:11
4.	"Johnny Walker"	Sathaji	Veeramani Karna	2:28
5.	"Kola Kolaiya"	Viveka	P. Unnikrishnan, Roshini	4:24
6.	"Kadhalilae Pengalukku"	Viveka	Krishnaraj	4:28
Total length:				24:52

== Critical reception ==
Sify wrote, "There is nothing positive in the film. It tries to cash in on the slum life and its brutal ways but ends up as too pretentious" and called the film "a waste of time".
