= Eli (2015 film) =

2015 Indian film by Yuvaraj Dhayalan

- Theatrical release poster
- Directed by: Yuvaraj Dhayalan
- Written by: Yuvaraj Dhayalan
- Produced by: G. Sathis Kumar; S. Amarnath
- Starring: Vadivelu; Sadha
- Cinematography: Paul Livingstone
- Edited by: V. T. Vijayan; T. S. Jay
- Music by: Vidyasagar
- Production company: City Cine Creations
- Distributed by: City Cine Creations
- Release date: 19 June 2015
- Running time: 154 minutes
- Country: India
- Language: Tamil

Eli (transl. Rat) is a 2015 Indian Tamil-language spy comedy written and directed by Yuvaraj Dhayalan. The film stars Vadivelu and Sadha. Vidyasagar composed the film's music. Eli, set in the 1960s, focuses on a small-time thief who is recruited by the police to infiltrate a gang in an effort to thwart an illegal cigarette smuggling scheme. The film was released on 19 June 2015.

== Plot ==
In 1960s, Chennai (Madras then), a police officer and a social worker give speech about ban of cigarettes in All India Radio. Then three men gets out from a car. They were thieves and led by Elisamy alias Eli, a petty thief (who once aspired to become a police officer) who pretends to be a captured-thief who has sold all his robbery items to a jewellery shop owner. The jewellery shop owner had no contact with him and his henchmen dressed as police take all the items pointed out and pretend to arrest Eli and loot the shop. He uses his tricks and loots many other places. One day he enters the house of retired police officer Rangarajan who had rejected him at the police selection. He loots everything except his photograph, in revenge. When the current IG Mohanraj arrives to meet Rangarajan, Eli pretends as though Rangarajan had vacated his house and he is performing rituals and not to disturb him. When the police officer meets Rangarajan on the way he is shocked to find that he had been tricked and Eli had looted the house.

Later when the police officer tells Rangarajan to send a police spy to catch the illegal cigarette cartel leader Nagarajan, Rangarajan recommends Eli to capture him. Eli pretends to be one of Nagarajan's henchmen and with the help of Julie captures Nagarajan red handed and hands him over to the police and also the policeman who had been helping Nagarajan.

== Cast ==
- Vadivelu as Elisamy alias "Eli" / Jolly
- Sadha as Julie
- Pradeep Rawat as Nagarajan
- Adithya Menon as IG Mohanraj IPS
- Santhana Bharathi as Jail Warden Ezhumalai
- Raj Kapoor as Police Inspector
- Rajendran as Kuruvi Manda Kumar
- Kitty as Retired IG Rangarajan IPS
- Bose Venkat as Inspector Karunakaran
- Besant Ravi as Pathanambakkam Ravi
- Shanmugarajan as spy
- Mahanadi Shankar as Padagu Babu
- Bava Lakshmanan as Eli's partner
- Vengal Rao as Eli's partner
- Nellai Siva
- King Kong as convict
- Muthukaalai as terrorist
- Boys Rajan as Padmanabhan
- Krishnamoorthy as Bank clerk
- Sakthivel as Jail warden
- Poochi Murugan as Minister Poochi Muthu
- Amirtha Lingam
- Pei Krishnan
- Kottai Perumal as smuggler
- Jayakumar as Police officer
- Aarivaya Shaik as Dumb convict
- Karnaa Radha

== Production ==
Eli is the second film of Vadivelu with Yuvaraj Dhayalan after Tenaliraman (2014). In March 2015, Sadha was confirmed to play the female lead in the film. In an interview with Sudhir Srinivasan of The Hindu, Dhayalan said that the inspiration for the film's title came from the repeated usage of the word "rat", which is a term used to denote an informant, in the American film The Departed (2006).

Principal photography commenced with the filming of a song sequence on the outskirts of the city, from the same day as the first look poster was released. A stunt sequence was shot at a specially erected set in early April 2015 over a period of eight days. According to Dhayalan, this sequence features Vadivelu evading the villain's henchmen instead of fighting them.

== Soundtrack ==
Vidyasagar composed the film's soundtrack and score while Pulamaipithan and Viveka wrote the lyrics. The music rights were purchased by Saregama. The launch of the soundtrack was held on 11 May 2015. During the audio launch, Vadivelu revealed that the Hindi song "Mere Sapno Ki Rani" from Aradhana (1969) would be reused in the film and that the sequence would feature himself and Sadha.

Track listing
No.	Title	Singer(s)	Length
1.	"Kollai Azhagu"	Mukesh Mohamed, Manjari	4:35
2.	"Kannameya"	Vadivelu	3:34
3.	"Engalukkum"	Hariharasudhan	4:29
Total length:			12:38

== Release and reception ==
Eli was released on 19 June 2015. Baradwaj Rangan of The Hindu wrote, "There have been films...that have mined comedy from crime, but just about nothing works here. Eli is full of scenes that go on forever — and for no reason....Even Vadivelu is stranded — the gags he's in are shockingly weak." The Times of India's M. Suganth gave the film 1.5 stars out of 5, describing it as "overlong, dull and largely unfunny" and adding, "Yuvaraj Dhayalan, seems to be after a spoof of spy movies but the filmmaking has no comic rhythm and the script, which rehashes elements from movies as varied as Ragasiya Police 115 and The Departed, is too slack that scenes just go on for ever". The New Indian Express wrote, "An insipid screenplay and flat narration ensures that it would be the most tedious and boring 154 minutes one could have spent in a theatre...the film is a test of patience". Sify called Eli an "unmitigated disaster" and "probably the worst movie he (Vadivelu) has ever done as a hero".
