= Oru Nadigaiyin Vaakkumoolam =

2012 Indian film by Rajkrishna

- Theatrical release poster
- Directed by: Rajkrishna
- Written by: Rajkrishna
- Produced by: Punnagai Poo Gheetha
- Starring: Sonia Agarwal
- Cinematography: Naga Krishnan
- Edited by: B. S. Vasu
- Music by: Aathish
- Production company: SG Films Pvt Ltd
- Release date: 10 February 2012
- Country: India
- Language: Tamil

Oru Nadigaiyin Vaakkumoolam (transl. Confessions of an Actress) is a 2012 Indian Tamil-language film, written and directed by Rajkrishna. The film stars Sonia Agarwal, with Kabil, Sathan, Urmila Unni, Rajkapoor, Kovai Sarala, and Ganja Karuppu in supporting roles. The music for the film was composed by Aathish with cinematography by Naga Krishnan and editing by B. S. Vasu. The film was released on 10 February 2012.

== Plot ==
The movie begins with a scribe named Rita searching for the actress Anjali. Anjali had disappeared after being a famous heroine. All searches to find this actress ended up as a failure. After the journalist finds her after many feats of hardships, there is a flashback revealing Anjali's travails. Being the daughter of a poor folk artiste named Devarajulu, her mother has been going to places to make her daughter an actress and reached Kodambakkam. After painfully climbing stairs and being rejected in every studio in Kodambakkam and Vadapalani, they agree on casting couch unhappily. However, Anjali gets her heroine role and makes it her debut after a compromise. This leads to a greed change in her mother to get money and leaves her in debt. After being humiliated by people in the industry exploiting her, she takes one of the film's extreme decisions. Thus, her discussions and other events lead up to the climax of the movie.

== Cast ==
- Sonia Agarwal as Anjali
- Urmila Unni as Girija
- Kovai Sarala as Papi
- Ganja Karuppu as Arokkiyasamy
- Raj Kapoor as Director
- Sathan
- Kabil
- Nicole
- Manobala
- Jyothi Lakshmi
- Robert
- Yogi Devaraj as Devarajulu
- Sukran as Datchinamurthy
- Boys Rajan as SG TV Channel MD
- Veyil Venkatesan
- Velmurugan
- Muthukaalai
- Punnagai Poo Gheetha as Rita (cameo appearance)
- Radha Krishnan in a special appearance
- Jithan Ramesh as himself (special appearance)
- Vikraman as himself (special appearance)
- A. Venkatesh as himself (special appearance)
- Suraj as himself (special appearance)

== Production ==
Sonia Agarwal accepted to work on the film after relating to script, stating that she also went through certain hardships during her time as an actress and lost weight to star in the film. The actress however clarified to the media before release that the film was not based on her life or any other actress's life. The success of the Hindi film, The Dirty Picture (2011), which was based on the same theme, created extra publicity for the film. Nicole was to supposed to shoot for the film for ten days but she stayed for twenty days at the insistentece of the film crew, out of which she only shot for five days.

== Soundtrack ==
Soundtrack was composed by Aatish.

- "Moondram Jenmam" - Anandhan, Anuradha Sriram
- "Vaanavil Idho" - Vinitha
- "Kaalai Sooriyan" - Ranjith
- "Cinema Cinema" - Mano

== Reception ==
A critic from IANS noted "the narrative style is outdated, the proceedings are disjointed and the screenplay lacks any coherence or logic" and added "a theme that had the potential to be an engrossing tale turns out to be a dull fare with diluted and archaic approach". A critic from Sify noted that "a premise that has to be insightful, dark and disturbing falls flat with an amateurish direction, jarring music and background score, wrong supporting cast, tacky production values and an old fashioned presentation". Likewise, The Hindu also gave the film a negative review, concluding the "script is weak and the dialogues repetitive".
