= Potta Potti =

- Poster
- Directed by: Yuvaraj Dhayalan
- Written by: Yuvaraj Dhayalan
- Produced by: V. Muraliraman
- Starring: Sadagoppan Ramesh; Harini
- Cinematography: Gopi Amarnath
- Edited by: Raja Mohammad
- Music by: Aruldev
- Production companies: AVR Talkies; Flicker Studios
- Release date: 5 August 2011
- Country: India
- Language: Tamil

Potta Potti is a 2011 Indian Tamil-language sports comedy film written and directed by newcomer Yuvaraj Dhayalan, featuring cricketer Sadagoppan Ramesh in the starring role alongside several newcomers. The film, initially titled Pattai Patti, was released on 5 August 2011.

== Plot ==
Kodaivannan and Kolaivannan are from a remote village. Both decide to marry a rich woman. The villagers decide to hold a cricket match with both lads in opposing teams and it is agreed that whoever out of the two wins the match would marry the woman. The 'good' hearted Kodaivannan's team kidnap a cricketer, Sadagoppan Ramesh. Kolaivannan also hires a greedy big-shot coach from Chennai, who eyes the extensive village land for his business.

Now, the teams of Kodaivannan and Kolaivannan have one more reason to fight against each other. To save the village, And the latter for the land which the greedy coach demands. Though, at the last, Kodaivannan wins the match successfully with Ramesh's coaching.

In between, the coach Ramesh falls in love with the woman whom Kodaivannan and Kolaivannan intend to marry.

== Cast ==
- Sadagoppan Ramesh as himself
- Harini as Ranjitham
- R. Sivam as Kodaivaanan
- Umar as Kolaivaanan
- Mayilsamy as Harichandra
- Avathar Ganesh as Avathaaram

== Soundtrack ==
All lyrics are written by Jayamurasu and Kevin Shadrach; all music is composed by Aruldev.

Track listing
No.	Title	Artist(s)	Length
1.	"Iduvarai Iduvarai"	Hariharan, Mahathi, Aruldev	4:12
2.	"Ekkuthappa Ekkuthappa"	Ranjith, Rahul Nambiar, Sathyan	5:02
3.	"Padai Nadungum"	Pavan	3:32
4.	"Adangaathaa Vegam"	Karthik	4:18
5.	"Never Gonna Change"	Vijay Narain	2:24

== Reception ==
Rediff.com's Pavithra Srinivasan gave it 2.5 out of 5, noting that it had "a Lagaan flavour" and "healthy doses of humour". Sify called the film "above average" and noted, "The film works because it is intelligent and uncompromising. It's packed with delicious little scenes, one liners and moments that will have you chuckling pretty much the moment you settle into your seat". Indo-Asian News Service said, "Potta Potti doesn't have the excitement of a movie based on sports but it doesn't disappoint as a fun-filled movie. Watch it for the innocence with which the villagers approach the game and some hilarious moments..."

Malathai Rangarajan from The Hindu wrote, "If keeping the viewer in splits is the aim, Potta Potti achieves it with ease", adding that it "may have arrived late, but the delay hardly affects the entertainment it provides". The New Indian Express wrote that the film "stays away from set patterns of film making, and proves yet again that a quality film can be made within a modest budget". N. Venkateswaran of The Times of India wrote, "Debutant writer-director Yuvaraaj does a fairly neat job, extracting the best from his fairly unknown cast and penning some very funny lines. But it would have helped if the pace was a-run-a-ball, rather than the occasional boundary".
