= Karma (Indian TV series) =

Indian superhero television series

- Genre: Superhero action drama
- Created by: Ekta Kapoor
- Written by: Subodh Chopra
- Directed by: Pavan S Kaul, Santram Varma
- Opening theme: "Karma" by KK
- Country of origin: India
- Original language: Hindi
- No. of seasons: 1
- No. of episodes: 26

Production
- Producers: Ekta Kapoor; Shobha Kapoor
- Cinematography: Prakash Barot
- Editors: K Rajdeep and Janak Chauhan
- Running time: 45 minutes
- Production company: Balaji Telefilms

Original release
- Network: StarPlus
- Release: 20 August 2004 – 11 February 2005

Karma – Koi Aa Raha Hai Waqt Badalney is an Indian superhero television series written by Subodh Chopra and directed by Pavan S Kaul. The show aired on StarPlus from 20 August 2004 to 11 February 2005. It was the first ever action-thriller show from Balaji Telefilms.

Karma revolves around the battle between good and evil as the titular superhero faces off against demonic evil. The main cast of the show is Siddharth Choudhary in the title role of Karma, Riva Bubber and Tinnu Anand. The show is based in a fictitious city named Panaki, but was shot in Mumbai and other cities in India. The series re-aired on Star Utsav and Pogo.

Earlier titled Kalki, it was later renamed before its premiere to Karma – Koi Aa Raha Hai Waqt Badalney. When titled as Kalki, the pilot episode was rejected by Star Plus in early 2003, after which the series was reworked as Karma.

== Plot ==
Karan Kapoor is born with supernatural powers, however he is oblivious to the fact until his twenty-first birthday when his powers increase at an alarming rate. He discovers that he was the "chosen one" who was born to defeat evil forces of Markesh. Teaming up with Gayatri Ji, he decides to finish the evil.

Meanwhile, he is in senior college, he notices that his classmates were cheating in exams and he discloses the fact to the school head. After that, those students beat him till death, but he is revived by his maternal grandfather Devdutt with the power of his meditation. As Devdutt uses the seven stars to revive him, he gets filled with the power of seven stars. After that he gets superpowers. His friend Mrinal Deshmukh, whom he loved, helps her out with her assignments as helping Karan while Karan saves her from all dangers by becoming Karma. Karma wears a black armor with seven stars in the center and a cape. Karma hides his identity from the people by wearing a mask on his eyes containing seven stars which shows that his power is the power of seven stars. He also throws a star sometimes with a 'K' written on it. He fights Markesh's assassins like Gunshot, Char Sau Chalis, Tilisma, Gilgit and Sonika to protect Panaki (The city where he resides). Karan had not got his love Mrinal and Mrinal had not loved him, so karan was searching for anyone else who will take care of his life. At last, in a face-to-face confrontation, he and Markesh find out that Markesh's mother and Karma stars were closely linked and killing Karma will result in Markesh's mother's death too. Therefore, Karma smartly plots to separate Markesh and Markesh's mother, so as to weaken them. In fact, he makes Markesh think that his mother is dead. And with many problems in Karan's own personal life, the show abruptly ends, with Karan lastly saying that he is Karma, he should keep on doing his duty without expecting any fortune for himself.

== Cast ==
- Siddharth Choudhary as Karan Kapoor / Karma
- Riva Bubber as Mrinal Deshmukh (Karan's former love interest)
- Mohan Kapoor / Nawab Shah as Markesh
- Tinnu Anand as Devdutt (Karan's maternal grandfather)
- Sudha Chandran as Gayatri (Guru Maa)
- Gaurav Chopra as Gunshot
- Melissa Pais as Kaira
- Aisha Shah as Maya
- Amita Chandekar as Manasi Mahesh Kapoor (Karan's mother and Devdutt's daughter)
- Nasser Abdullah as Professor Mahesh Kapoor (Karan's father)
- Sikandar Kharbanda as Rocky
- Anuj Gupta as Lalit
- Deepak Jethi as Challenger
- Ketan Karande as Yaksh / Markesh's Henchman
- Vicky Ahuja as Tilisma
- Vindu Dara Singh as Culprit 440
- Rio Kapadia as Chief Executive Officer of Right News Channel
- Kaliprasad Mukherjee as Dr. Merchant
- Puneet Vashisht as Jimmy Fernandes
- Sonia Kapoor as Gayatri (Guru Maa)
- Mithilesh Chaturvedi as Joe
- Alihassan Turabi
