= Deva (1995 film) =

1995 film by S. A. Chandrasekhar

- Poster
- Directed by: S. A. Chandrasekharan
- Story by: Shoba
- Produced by: B. Vimal
- Starring: Vijay; Swathi
- Cinematography: Selva. R
- Edited by: P. R. Gautham Raj
- Music by: Deva
- Production company: B. V. Combines
- Distributed by: XB Film Creators
- Release date: 17 February 1995
- Running time: 140 minutes
- Country: India
- Language: Tamil

Deva (/ðeɪvɑː/) is a 1995 Indian Tamil-language romantic action film directed by S. A. Chandrasekharan and produced by B. Vimal. The film stars Vijay, and debutante Swathi, while Sivakumar, Manorama, Mansoor Ali Khan and Manivannan play supporting roles. The film revolves around a couple who are deeply in love, but encounter opposition from the woman's father, who is head of the village. The father believes the man is not a suitable partner due to his perceived reputation. The film was released on 17 February 1995.

== Plot ==
Deva and Bharathi are deeply in love, but encounter opposition from Bharathi's father Gandhidasan, the head of the village. Gandhidasan believes that Deva is not a worthy suitor due to his perceived reputation throughout the village. Although the son of the wealthy Raasathi, it comes to light that Gandhidasan's disapproval stems from his relationship with his brother Rajadurai aka Periyavar, who is seemingly apathetic and unenthusiastic. The film ends happily with Gandhidasan recognising that his now son-in-law Deva is actually a really upstanding citizen in the village. Deva and Bharathi overcome all problems and live their lives happily married.

== Cast ==
- Vijay as Deva
- Swathi as Bharathi
- Sivakumar as Gandhidasan
- Manorama as Raasathi
- Mansoor Ali Khan as Rajadurai (Periyavar)
- Manivannan as Mayilsamy
- Vinu Chakravarthy as Deputy superintendent of police
- S. A. Chandrasekhar as Marimuthu
- Kumarimuthu as Rajadurai's assistant
- Kovai Senthil as Iyer
- K. S. G. Venkatesh as Gandhidasan's son
- Ennatha Kannaiya as Villager
- Chelladurai as Villager
- O. A. K. Sundar as Villager
- Chaplin Balu as Villager
- Madhusudhan Rao as Villager
- Usha Priya as Prostitute

== Production ==
R. Selva, a relative of Chandrasekhar, made his debut as cinematographer with this film. He received the opportunity when Chandrasekhar was impressed with his cinematography he did for the Bengali film Raja Bachcha.

== Soundtrack ==
The music was composed by Deva.

Track listing
No.	Title	Lyrics	Singer(s)	Length
1.	"Aiyayo Alamelu"	Vaali	Vijay	4:47
2.	"Chinna Paiyyan"	Vaali	S. N. Surendar, K. S. Chithra	4:42
3.	"Innoru Gandhi"	Pulamaipithan	Mano, S. N. Surendar	4:17
4.	"Kothagiri Kuppamma"	Vaali	Vijay, Swarnalatha, Manorama	5:02
5.	"Oru Kaditham" (Male)	Vaali	S. P. Balasubrahmanyam, Vijay	5:06
6.	"Oru Kaditham" (Female)	Vaali	K. S. Chithra	4:58
7.	"Deva Vara"	Vaali	Shoba Chandrasekhar, Deva	2:13
8.	"Marumagane"	Kavidasan	Deva, Krishnaraj	4:49
Total length:				35:54

== Reception ==
Thulasi of Kalki praised Vijay for his maturity but advised him not to take the risk of singing songs. She also appreciated the cinematographer and choreographer for adding more beauty to the film and concluded that the director's screenplay is perfect and ups and downs are okay to keep the audience engaged but asked him not to insult women in his next film. Manivannan won the Tamil Nadu State Film Award for Best Comedian.
