= Evergreen Movie International =

Indian film company

- Type: Film production Film distribution
- Industry: Entertainment
- Founded: 2000
- Headquarters: Chennai, India
- Key people: V. A. Durai
- Products: Motion pictures (Tamil)

Evergreen Movie International is an Indian film production and distribution company headed by V. A. Durai. The studio collaborated with actor Sathyaraj and director Sakthi Chidambaram on multiple ventures in the early 2000s, before running into financial trouble through the making of Bala's Pithamagan (2003).

== History ==
Durai made his first film Ennamma Kannu (2000) directed by Sakthi Chidambaram, and starring Sathyaraj and Devayani. He later collaborated with Sathyaraj again in Looty (2001) and Vivaramana Aalu (2002), and with Sakthi Chidambaram in Lovely (2001). Durai and Evergreen Movie International worked as executive producers for the making of Suresh Krishna's Baba (2002) starring Rajinikanth.

The studio ran into financial trouble during the making of Bala's Pithamagan (2003) starring Vikram and Suriya. Bala went over the agreed budget, and as a result, Durai held back on settling the payments for the lead actors. The film won critical acclaim upon release, also winning Durai the Filmfare Award for Best Tamil Film. Bala later agreed to pay Durai following the release of his maiden production venture. Bala announced and started projects as a producer including Maayavi (2005), Paramasivan (2006) and Naan Kadavul (2009), before selling the rights to other producers. As a result, Durai pursued a litigation case against Bala. As a result of the complications following Pithamagan's release, Durai produced Gajendra under a different production studio named Tamilanai Cine Creation. The film ran into release issues as a result of Vijayakanth's political involvement, with cadres from Pattali Makkal Katchi threatening to indulge in violence at theatres owing to Vijayakanth's comments against their party leader. In 2005, Durai planned a film with director P. C. Anbazhagan and actor Murali, but the film did not begin production. He later also attempted to cast Ajith Kumar and Jiiva in films by Tarun Gopi and Ameer respectively, but neither project materialised.

In mid-2008, Durai announced a return to films with a project titled Naai Kutty (2010) by newcomer S. S. Joe. Prasanna and Nicole signed to play the lead roles while comedian Santhanam was approached to play a significant role and Sundar C. Babu was chosen to compose the music. In late-September 2008, a complaint had been lodged by director Ram Shiva alleging that the story had been taken from the Kannada film Nanda Loves Nanditha. He alleged that Durai tried to buy the rights for remaking the film in Tamil but his efforts were in vain and had decided to plagiarise the script as a result. Durai later restarted the project with a new script and Sathaji was chosen to direct the film after Joe opted out. Newcomer Selvin signed on after Prasanna opted out of the role and Soori replaced Santhanam. He made a second attempted comeback through the comedy drama Kagitha Kappal (2016) starring Appukutty but the film went unnoticed.

V. A. Durai died in October 2023 following long-term illnesses.

== Filmography ==
Title	Year	Director	Cast	Synopsis	Ref.
Ennamma Kannu	2000	Sakthi Chidambaram	Sathyaraj, Devayani, Ranjith	Kaasi, a womaniser woos a girl Gayathri she rejects him and is in love with his friend Vishwa. When Vishwa deserts her on the day of the wedding, Kaasi offers refuge to her.	
Looty	2001	Parameshwar	Sathyaraj, Roja, Mumtaj	Rasappa and Geetha who are childless adopt a baby however Geetha suspects the baby as Rasappa's biological son	
Lovely	2001	Sakthi Chidambaram	Karthik, Malavika, Monal	Chandru and Niveditha who are in love comes up with a plan to impress her father who hates love	
Vivaramana Aalu	2002	K. Selva Bharathy	Sathyaraj, Devayani, Mumtaj		
Pithamagan	2003	Bala	Vikram, Suriya, Laila, Sangeetha	A naive but violent grave digger and loud mouthed thief befriend each other	
Gajendra	2004	Suresh Krissna	Vijayakanth, Flora, Laya		
Naai Kutty	2009	Sathaji	Selvin, Nicole, Soori		
Kagitha Kappal	2016	S. Sivaraman	Appukutty, Dilija, M. S. Bhaskar		
