= Sindhu Bath =

- Directed by: Balu Anand
- Written by: Balu Anand
- Produced by: T. M. Jayamurugan; M. Appu
- Starring: Mansoor Ali Khan; Kasthuri; Sanghavi
- Cinematography: B. Ahamed
- Edited by: L. Kesavan
- Music by: Deva
- Production company: Manithan Cine Arts
- Release date: 15 September 1995
- Running time: 135 minutes
- Country: India
- Language: Tamil

Sindhu Bath is a 1995 Indian Tamil-language drama film directed by Balu Anand. The film stars Mansoor Ali Khan, Kasthuri and Sanghavi, with R. Sundarrajan, Senthil, Rajan P. Dev, Kovai Sarala and Jai Ganesh playing supporting roles. It was released on 15 September 1995, and failed at the box office.

== Plot ==
The film begins with Mayilsamy getting released from jail. Mayilsamy then finds himself caught up in a bank robbery. The building is surrounded by the police, the robber Muthu then threatens to shoot Mayilsamy if Mayilsamy refuses to act as a robber. Muthu manages to escape from the police but Mayilsamy catches him and forces him to surrender to the police. At the police station, Muthu tells him that he stole this money for a good cause and begs him to save him. Mayilsamy and Muthu then run away from the police station but they have lost the suitcase full of money.

Being sought by the police, Muthu offers him to stay in his boss' house for a few days. Muthu tells Mayilsamy that he steals the money to arrange the marriage between his boss' daughter Shobana and her boyfriend. Bhama, a small-time crook, enters Shobana's house and claims to be Shobana's grandmother. Mayilsamy and Shobana are now forced to act as husband and wife. Afterwards, their drama took a sharp turn for the worse, when Mayilsamy discovers that Shobana's father is Sarangan.

In the past, Mayilsamy was a poor bangle seller in his village. Mayilsamy and the village belle Kannatha were madly in love with each other. When her father Rasu Gounder, a rich landlord, learnt about the love affair between Kannatha and a bangle seller, he locked up his daughter in her room. The politician Sarangan then promised Mayilsamy to arrange his wedding with Kannatha if he stole the gold jewels from the village temple. As promised, Mayilsamy brought him the jewels but later, Sarangan betrayed him and fled with the jewels. The next day, Kannatha committed suicide and the innocent Mayilsamy was arrested for stealing the temple jewels.

Back to the present, Mayilsamy is determined to take revenge on Sarangan, who is now a minister. What transpires next forms the rest of the story.

== Cast ==
- Mansoor Ali Khan as Mayilsamy
- Kasthuri as Shobana
- Sanghavi as Kannatha
- R. Sundarrajan as Muthu
- Senthil
- Rajan P. Dev as Sarangan
- Kovai Sarala as Bhama
- Jai Ganesh as Rasu Gounder
- Ra. Sankaran as Doctor
- Krishnamoorthy as Shankaran
- M. C. Nadrajan
- B. Ashokarajan
- Joker Thulasi
- Nellai Siva
- Karnan as Rajini
- Radha Rani

== Soundtrack ==
The soundtrack was composed by Deva, with lyrics written by Vairamuthu and T. M. Jayamurugan.

Song	Singer(s)	Duration
"Vaa Vaa Kanni Thene"	Ranga Babu	3:03
"Jal Jal Valayal"	Malaysia Vasudevan	5:10
"Jan Janakku"	S. Janaki, Krishnaraj, Sundaraj	4:50
"Sindhubath Kottayile"	Mano, K. S. Chithra	5:10
"Va Va Kanni Thene Vaanam"	S. P. Balasubrahmanyam, K. S. Chithra	5:12
