= Annan (film) =

1999 film

- Title card
- Directed by: Anu Mohan
- Written by: Anu Mohan
- Produced by: T. Seenuvasan
- Starring: Ramarajan; Swathi
- Cinematography: T. Damodaran
- Edited by: B. Krishnakumar
- Music by: Ilaiyaraaja
- Production company: Myson Pictures
- Release date: 26 March 1999
- Running time: 145 minutes
- Country: India
- Language: Tamil

Annan (transl. Elder brother) is a 1999 Indian Tamil language drama film directed by Anu Mohan. The film stars Ramarajan and Swathi, with Manivannan, R. Sundarrajan, newcomers Vaasan and Apoorva, Vadivukkarasi and Ponvannan playing supporting roles. It was released on 26 March 1999.

== Plot ==
Velan (Ramarajan) is the manager of the village market and is a respected man. He loves dearly his only sister Lakshmi (Apoorva) who is the village's school teacher. Sundari (Swathi) and her father (R. Sundarrajan) come to Velan's village. Velan and Sundari fall in love whereas Lakshmi and the rural development officer Selvam (Vaasan) also fall in love. In the meantime, Velan and the village chief Rasappan (Manivannan) decide to arrange the marriage between Lakshmi and the wicked Rasappan's son Manikkam (Ponvannan). One day, Selvam breaks the village's rule and he is beaten at the village court. Lakshmi finally reveals the love between them and they get married. Selvam is not a rural development officer but a police officer who urges to arrest Velan. In the past, Velan killed a local rowdy who was, in fact, Selvam's father. Selvam arrests Velan and Velan is sent to jail. Manikkam becomes the new manager of the village market. Without sufficient evidence, the court releases Velan and he comes back to his village. Now, Velan has to face Selvam and Manikkam. What transpires later forms the crux of the story.

== Cast ==
- Ramarajan as Velan
- Swathi as Sundari
- Manivannan as Rasappan
- R. Sundarrajan as Sundari’s father
- Vaasan as Selvam
- Apoorva as Lakshmi
- Vadivukkarasi as Guruvamma, Selvam's mother
- Ponvannan as Manikkam
- Pandu as Sangu
- Balu Anand
- Vishwanath
- Rajappa
- Rajendra Kumar
- Chinnakannu
- Kanthan
- K. Rameshraj
- R. S. Samiraj
- Padmanabhan
- Nadrayan
- Chatur Sethupathi
- Ashokrajan
- Master Jafar
- Baby Kavitha
- Chelladurai
- Kottai Perumal
- Kovai Senthil as Ayyakannu
- Anuja
- Kalpana

== Soundtrack ==
The soundtrack was composed by Ilaiyaraaja.

Track list
No.	Title	Lyrics	Singer(s)	Length
1.	"Aalamarathu Kuyile"	Arivumathi	Ilaiyaraaja, Sujatha	5:02
2.	"Kanmanikku Vazhthu" (Female)	Kamakodiyan	Bhavatharini	4:24
3.	"Kanmanikku Vazhthu" (Male)	Kamakodiyan	Ilaiyaraaja	4:24
4.	"Vayasu Pulla Vayasu Pulla"	Arivumathi	Ilaiyaraaja, Sujatha	5:08
5.	"Otha Roobavukku Oru"	Mu. Metha	Swarnalatha, Arunmozhi	5:00
6.	"Kutti Nalla Kutti"	Gangai Amaran	Arunmozhi	5:03
Total length:				29:01
