= Vasantha Vaasal =

- VHS cover
- Directed by: M. R
- Written by: M. R
- Produced by: M. R
- Starring: Vijay; Swathi
- Cinematography: Kichas
- Edited by: Tata Suresh
- Music by: Masa (Songs); Dhina (Score)
- Production company: Kumar Movies
- Release date: 22 March 1996
- Running time: 135 minutes
- Country: India
- Language: Tamil
- Budget: ₹20 lakh
- Box office: ₹1.30 crore

Vasantha Vaasal (transl. Spring gate) is a 1996 Indian Tamil-language romantic action film written, produced and directed by M.R. (in his directorial debut). The movie stars Vijay and Swathi in the lead roles, while Mansoor Ali Khan, Vadivelu, and Kovai Sarala play supporting roles. This was a debut film for the music director Masa. The film was originally scheduled to be released in September 1995, but was delayed later in March 1996. The film collected ₹1.30 crore end of its run made on a budget of ₹20 lakh in 1996 and declared a box office success.

== Plot ==
Vijay comes to the city with an ambition to star in movies as he is totally mad about cinema. He lives as a tenant in Divya's house. He tries acting out film scenes and speaking film dialogues in a loud fashion, thus disturbing her studies. Thus, both of them get off on the wrong foot, but they finally fall in love with each other. Ganesh is Divya's maternal uncle who also wants to marry her. Ganesh starts to disturb the lovers, but Vijay fights for Divya and finally wins her hand.

== Cast ==
- Vijay as Vijay
- Swathi as Divya
- Mansoor Ali Khan as Ganesh
- Vadivelu as Velu
- Kovai Sarala as Velu's wife
- C. R. Saraswathi as Vasantha, Divya's mother
- Idichapuli Selvaraj as Makeup Artist
- Shakeela as Sunitha
- Kullamani
- Vellai Subbaiah
- C. I. D. Sakunthala as Velu's mother-in-law
- Jeeva as Rani
- Bayilvan Ranganathan
- Chaplin Balu as Vijay's friend

== Production ==
Vasantha Vaasal was the first film where Vijay, then associated primarily with his home banner, acted for an "outside banner".

== Soundtrack ==
All songs were written by Masa, Uma Kannadasan, M.R. Music was composed by Masa. The audio rights were acquired by Mayil Music Tamil.

Title	Singer(s)	Lyrics	Length
"Aadi Kulugum"	Shahul Hameed, Swarnalatha	M. R	04:58
"Athipathi Azhagu"	Arunmozhi, K. S. Chithra	Masa	04:44
"En Kadhali"	Mano	Masa	04:47
"En Thegam"	S. Janaki, chorus	Uma Kannadasan	04:38
"Macham Enga Irukku"	Mano, Sindhu	Masa	04:54
"Pudhu Roja"	Arunmozhi	Masa	04:58
"Raathiriniley"	Mano, Sindu	Uma Kannadasan	04:33

== Reception ==
The Hindu wrote " A love story of two youngsters with different ideals in life has not been given the required treatment by director Emmar in Kumar Movies Vasantha Vaasal. The director adopts the safe method of mixing song and dance sequences with the I hate you attitude of the heroine, peppering the proceedings, with some fights. But these fail to jell because there is nothing new with the director not putting on his thinking cap to infuse new situations."
