= Nicole (actress) =

Indian actress

- Occupation: Actress
- Years active: 2001–2012

Nicole is a former Indian actress who worked predominantly in Tamil-language films.

== Early life and career ==
Her father Ricky D'Costa is a rhythm box player who worked under Deva before going on to work in several Kannada films. Her mother named her after Nicole Kidman. She made her acting debut playing the younger version of Devayani's character in Vinnukum Mannukum (2001). She did an acting and dancing course in Mumbai and took up a career in acting much to the dissatisfaction of her father. Nicole made her Tamil debut in a glamorous role in Adada Enna Azhagu (2009). She worked on two more films throughout 2009: Aarumaname and Naai Kutty. She took a brief hiatus from acting to get her driver's license when she was eighteen years old. The shoot of her next film Oru Nadigaiyin Vaakkumoolam was embroiled in controversy as she was only supposed to shoot for ten days but the film crew made her stay twenty days, out of which she only shot for five days.

== Filmography ==
Year	Title	Role	Language	Notes
2001	Vinnukum Mannukum	Young Devayani	Tamil	child artist
2007	Vidyarthi		Kannada	
2007	Gundamma Gaari Manavadu		Telugu	
2009	Adada Enna Azhagu	Nisha	Tamil	
2009	Aarumaname	Anandhi	Tamil	
2009	Naai Kutty	Malli	Tamil	
2012	Oru Nadigaiyin Vaakkumoolam		Tamil	
