= Vivaramana Aalu =

- VCD cover
- Directed by: K. Selva Bharathy
- Written by: K. Selva Bharathy (dialogues)
- Screenplay by: K. Selva Bharathy
- Story by: V. G. Ramalingam
- Produced by: V. A. Durai
- Starring: Sathyaraj; Vivek; Devayani; Mumtaj
- Cinematography: K. Vijay Chakravarthi
- Edited by: B. Lenin; V. T. Vijayan
- Music by: Deva
- Production company: Evergreen Movie International
- Release date: 14 January 2002
- Running time: 152 minutes
- Country: India
- Language: Tamil

Vivaramana Aalu (transl. Knowledgeable Person) is a 2002 Indian Tamil-language comedy drama film directed by K. Selva Bharathy. The film stars Sathyaraj, Vivek, Devayani and Mumtaj, with Ponnambalam, Prathap K. Pothan, Kanal Kannan and Manochithra playing supporting roles. The film, produced by V. A. Durai, was released on 14 January 2002.

== Plot ==
In Coimbatore, Mayilsamy is a pickpocket who is determined to make it big in life, by hook or crook. After being released from jail, his friend "Palladam" Bhaskar advises him to go to Chennai and to join the gang of Kota Subramaniam. In the meantime, Kota Subramaniam who is in Coimbatore pressures the innocent village belle Pappu to marry him. Mayilsamy then comes across Kota Subramaniam, he beats him up and steals his money. A politician, who witnessed the scene, asks Mayilsamy to marry Pappu in exchange for money promised by the government for those who marry girls from financially weak families. Mayilsamy marries her and deserts her soon after.

In Chennai, Mayilsamy tries to find Kota Subramaniam. The petty thief "Suitcase" Subbu who used to steal suitcases for a living is now cheating under the name of Dr John Britto, a psychiatrist doctor. When Mayilsamy tries to escape from the police, he ends in the asylum of Dr John Britto. Mayilsamy who knows about "Suitcase" Subbu's secret lies him that he is the real Dr John Britto and he decides to keep "Suitcase" Subbu as his assistant.

Puppy is a wealthy heiress and a mentally ill woman. Her parents, who are hell-bent on saving their family's prestige at any cost, do not want people to know about their daughter's mental illness and they hate each other. Mayilsamy who comes across Puppy decides to become her personal doctor and plans to marry her. Puppy is in fact faking as a mental patient to bring her parents together. Thanks to Mayilsamy, Puppy's parents reconcile and now want Mayilsamy to marry their daughter Puppy . Puppy falls in love with Mayilsamy. In the meantime, Pappu comes to Chennai looking for her husband Mayilsamy and "Suitcase" Subbu decides to help her.

Mayilsamy eventually realises his folly. He decides to live with his wife Pappu and to make an honest living. He also apologizes to Puppy for playing with her feelings.

== Cast ==
- Sathyaraj as Mayilsamy
- Vivek as "Suitcase" Subbu
- Devayani as Pappu
- Mumtaj as Puppy
- Ponnambalam as Kota Subramaniam
- Prathap K. Pothan as Mr O, Puppy's father
- Kanal Kannan as Inspector Karuppu
- Manochithra as Puppy's mother
- Periya Karuppu Thevar as Politician
- Tiruppur Ramasamy
- Dhadha Muthukumar as "Palladam" Bhaskar
- Chelladurai as Kandhasamy
- Mayilsamy as Funeral dancer
- Scissor Manohar as Anbu
- Muthukaalai as Seenu
- Bonda Mani as Mentally ill man
- Jayamani as Police constable
- Kottai Perumal as Police constable
- Lekhasri as Rukku
- Kottachi as "Suitcase" Subbu's assistant
- Soundar as Kota Subramaniam's henchman
- Lollu Sabha Soundarya as Young lover
- Citizen Mani as Newlywed man
- Senthil as Politician (guest appearance)
- Vinu Chakravarthy as Inspector Mariappan (guest appearance)
- Monal in a special appearance

== Soundtrack ==
The soundtrack was composed by Deva.

Track listing
No.	Title	Writer(s)	Singer(s)	Length
1.	"Eeccha Eechambazham"	Kabilan	Krishnaraj, Pushpa Sriram	4:50
2.	"Rottila Kiss Adhicha"	Na. Muthukumar	Mathangi	3:52
3.	"Adiye Azhagi Aaravalli"	Na. Muthukumar	Sabesh, Anuradha Sriram, Chitra Sivaraman	5:28
4.	"Yei Maamaa"	Na. Muthukumar	Tippu, Mathangi	5:34
5.	"Vaadaa Vaadaa Paalkaaraa"	P. Vijay	Anuradha Sriram	4:54
Total length:				24:38

== Reception ==
Sify wrote, "Director Selvabharathy's idea is to please the frontbenchers as the story moves ahead. There is a comedy, sex, smutty dialogues and jokes galore at politicians especially targeting Tamilnadu chief Minister O. Panneerselvam". Mallini Mannath of Chennai Online said, "Verbal and situational comedy, some of them enjoyable, is packed in. The director makes no bones about catering to the masses. Giving Sathyaraj company is Vivek, straining his voice to a crescendo, fitting in well with the director's requirements. Mumtaz, for a change, has a meaty role, and uses well the opportunity given to her". Cinesouth wrote "Director Selva Bharati had taught us a very good lesson by his mistakes - its not enough if you manage to get a title that suits Sathyaraj, or get Vivek & Mumtaj as his co-stars, but, for a comedy movie also needs a screenplay".
