= Yogi (2009 Tamil film) =

- Poster
- Directed by: Subramaniam Siva
- Screenplay by: Ameer
- Story by: Subramaniam Siva
- Produced by: Ameer
- Starring: Ameer; Madhumitha; Vincent Asokan; Swathi
- Cinematography: R. B. Gurudev; K. Devaraj
- Edited by: Ram Sudharsan
- Music by: Yuvan Shankar Raja
- Production company: Teamwork Production House
- Release date: 27 November 2009
- Running time: 145 minutes
- Country: India
- Language: Tamil

Yogi is a 2009 Indian Tamil-language action drama film directed by Subramaniam Siva. Produced by Ameer, he stars as the titular protagonist alongside Madhumitha, Swathi, Vincent Asokan, Ponvannan, lyricist Snehan (in his acting debut), and Ganja Karuppu. An uncredited remake of the 2005 South African film Tsotsi, the film was written and produced by Ameer himself, and features musical score composed by Yuvan Shankar Raja.

The film follows Yogi, a slum-dwelling criminal who makes a living from murder and robbery. When police chase him during a robbing spree, he steals a woman's car and succeeds in fleeing. His life changes when he realizes there is a baby in the car, and he cannot let go of it, even though he attempts to do so while abandoning the getaway car.

Launched in 2007, Yogi was released theatrically on 27 November 2009. The same year, it was showcased at the 6th Dubai International Film Festival.

== Plot ==
Yogeshwaran "Yogi" and his gang of three men live in a slum on the edge, making a living out of robberies and murders and having no human emotions. Yogi, in particular, has a dark secret about his bad past, which he keeps to himself. One day, during a robbing spree, he is chased by the police. He gets into a car parked by a woman in front of a fruit shop and manages to flee, when he suddenly hears the cry of a child, finding a three-month-old baby in the car's backseat. He abandons the car and leaves the baby in there, but as he hears the baby crying, he is moved, and the human being in him wakes up. He gets back to shove the baby into a large shopping bag and takes it home with him. He hides the baby from the rest of his gang and tries to take care of the baby alone.

Yogi, then holding at gunpoint, coerces Rajasulochana, a young mother hailing from Andhra Pradesh and deserted by her husband, to breastfeed that baby. Meanwhile, it is revealed that the child's real mother, Caroline, is desperate to get her child back, whilst her husband Linden, happening to be merely the stepfather of the baby, searches with the help of rowdies for the baby, which he actually wants dead.

In the meantime, Yogi slowly transforms into a new man thanks to the baby, which apparently prompts feelings in him, even planning to keep and raise the child himself. A flashback reveals his past, where he had an atrocious childhood as he was terrorised by his sadistic father, a beggar who was responsible for the death of his mother and sister, and for making Yogi himself a brute. However, he changes his plans and decides to reunite the baby with its mother, but unfortunately, the child slips into Linden's hands. Yogi gets to know that Linden wants to kill the baby and tries to prevent this and save the baby.

== Cast ==
- Ameer as Yogeshwaran (Yogi)
- Madhumitha as Raja sulochana
- Swathi as Caroline Linden
- Vincent Asokan as Linden Fernando
- Snehan as Sadai
- Ponvannan
- Ganja Karuppu as "Stills" Mani
- Babu as Aspiring Actor
- Nandha Periyasamy
- Besant Ravi
- Dinakaran Reporter Devaraj as Yogi's father
- Ghazali as MLA Thiruna
- Vinodh as Inbaraj
- Jijuba as Urula (Sampath)

== Production ==
Yogi is the debut for Ameer in a leading role. He chose Subramaniam Siva to direct the film after being impressed by the director's work in Thiruda Thirudi (2003). Ameer, seeking to achieve the physique of a coolie, went on a specific diet by eating only chapati and eggs, avoiding biryani and having to eat only within 45 minutes of completing his workout. A number of actresses were approached to play the female lead but refused, and the role went to Madhumitha. Lyricist Snehan made his acting debut in the film. Journalist Devaraj played a prominent role, while 20 newcomers were to make their debut in the film, including two real-life slum dwellers, who would play Ameer's friends.

Filming began in mid-November 2007 and was completed by mid-July 2009. Since the story revolves around a slum dweller in an urban slum, shooting was mainly held around slum areas in Chennai as in Egmore, Saidapet, Chennai Central and Teynampet. Several fight scenes in the climax were shot at the terrace of Big Bazaar in Vadapalani, at Ennore and a house in Besant Nagar. Ameer was injured while filming a stunt sequence, where he had to jump from 40 meter high and sustained fracture in his right hand.

== Soundtrack ==
The music of Yogi is composed by Yuvan Shankar Raja. Much of the music is centred on the traditional instrument sarangi played by Ustad Sultan Khan. The album has six songs written by Snehan and was released on 13 September 2009 under the Sony Music India label, although work on the background music continued through October 2009.

Karthik S wrote for Bangalore Mirror, "Barring one song, Yogi's soundtrack is brilliant". Pavithra Srinivasan from Rediff.com wrote, "You get the feeling that [Yuvan is] really trying to put out something new in his songs, and the effort shows but it doesn't last, and he falls into familiar patter[n]s. Yogi would be considered good from any other composer, but from Yuvan, you've come to expect more. In that sense, it only partially delivers".

Track listing
No.	Title	Singer(s)	Length
1.	"Yogi Yogi Thaan"	Blaaze, Neha Bhasin	3:56
2.	"Yaarodu Yaaro"	Yuvan Shankar Raja, Ustad Sultan Khan	5:24
3.	"Yogi Theme In Saarangi"	Ustad Sultan Khan	4:02
4.	"Seermevum Koovathiley"	Ameer, Naveen Madhav, Snehan, Jijuba	5:52
5.	"Yogi Theme Music"	Instrumental	1:57
6.	"Yogi Yogi Thaan Version II"	Blaaze, Neha Bhasin	4:18
Total length:			25:29

== Critical reception ==
Pavithra Srinivasan from Rediff.com gave the film 3 stars out 5 and praised the secondary actors, dialogues, twists, music and art direction. Criticism was aimed towards the performance of Ameer, slow pacing and the film's similarities with Tsotsi. Bhama Devi Ravi from The Times of India gave the film 2.5 stars out of 5, noting it had plenty of fight scenes unlike the original, and praised the film's rawness along with the performances. However, the reviewer felt the film reminded too much of Tsotsi, and also criticised the melodramatic episodes and lack of depth in characterisation. A reviewer from Sify praised the performances and cinematography, while criticising the music, loopholes in writing and excessive melodrama in the second half, along with the execution and predictability of the climax.

Malathi Rangarajan from The Hindu praised the performances of Devaraj and Madhumitha, Ganja Karuppu's situational humor, editing and music. However, she felt Ameer was expressionless and the pace was too slow for an action film. Devan Nair of TimesLIVE appreciated Gurudev's cinematography and Ram Sudarshan's editing, but added, "It is a great technical effort that has been underplayed because of his blatant plagiarism [...] Yogi is riveting viewing for those who haven't seen Tsotsi, and for those who have, it does make for captivating viewing". Cinefundas wrote that it "lacks substantiality over the script and lengthy screenplay and so on. If you ask us, whether this film deserves a watch? Definitely not!".
