= Ivan Maryadaraman =

- Theatrical poster
- Directed by: Suresh Divakar
- Screenplay by: Udayakrishna-Siby K. Thomas
- Story by: S. S. Kanchi
- Based on: Maryada Ramanna by S. S. Rajamouli
- Produced by: Anto Joseph
- Starring: Dileep; Nikki Galrani; Nagineedu; Kailash
- Cinematography: Vijay Ulaganath
- Edited by: Johnkutty
- Music by: Gopi Sundar
- Production company: Anto Joseph Film Company
- Distributed by: Anto Joseph Film Company Release; ACHU & ACHU'S CREATIONS in Australia & New Zealand
- Release date: 4 April 2015
- Running time: 165 minutes
- Country: India
- Language: Malayalam

Ivan Maryadaraman (transl. This is polite Raman) is a 2015 Indian Malayalam-language comedy drama film directed by Suresh Divakar (in his directorial debut). starring Dileep, Nikki Galrani, Nagineedu and Kailash with a supporting cast including Satyadev, Sudheer Sukumaran, Abu Salim, Santhosh Keezhattoor, Vadivukkarasi, Thara Kalyan, Sunil Sukhada, Ponnamma Babu and Saju Navodaya. The film is produced by Anto Joseph under Anto Joseph Film Company and scripted by Udayakrishna-Siby K. Thomas. It is a remake of the 2010 Telugu film Maryada Ramanna, which itself is inspired from Buster Keaton's 1923 silent film, Our Hospitality. (Note: References based on "Ivan Maryadaraman" film)

== Plot ==
The story starts 30 years ago where Puthukottayil Veerabhadran gets a phone call regarding the release of Indrasimhan from jail. Indrasimhan had killed Veerabhadran's father and in order to seek revenge, he leaves to kill him. Meanwhile, Narasimhan, Indrasimhan's elder brother persuades him to kill Veerabhadran as he too murdered Indrasimhan's wife and child. In an ensuing fight between both of them, Indrasimhan is killed and Veerabhadran is nearly killed. On reaching home, Veerabhadran's wife Sumitra is worried as their rivals are out to kill Sumitra and their son. However, Veerabhadran succumbs to injuries and his wife takes their son and leaves the village in fear. Afterward, Narasimhan persuades his sons Suryasimhan and Chandrasimhan to kill Veerabhadran's son on his arrival at their village.

Then the story shifts to Veerabhadran's son Ramachandran alias Raman, a rice mill factory worker in Pune. He takes goods from factory to other places in his old and damaged bicycle. Out of rage, the factory owner rebukes Raman and as a result he is expelled. However, in order to continue with his job, Raman decides to buy an Auto Rickshaw to make his job easier. So he decides to go to his village to get money that his parents has invested in his name before their death. He catches a train to Ramapuram, his hometown. In the train he meets Krishnendu, who is Narasimhan's daughter. They become good friends during the journey. After reaching his hometown, he follows Krishnendu to give her book that she had forgotten in the train. He later meets Suryasimhan who leaves him at the post office without knowing his identity. Raman is successful in collecting his money, which he would get that evening. However, one of the office staffs informs Suryasimhan the real identity of Raman. Out of rage, Suryasimhan returns to the post office in search of Raman to kill him but in vain. Afterwards, Raman meets Narasimhan and Chandrasimhan in a temple. They respectfully invite him home as a guest. To his surprise he meets Krishna whom he learns is the fiancée of Rajeev, a doctor settled in America. During lunch, Suryasimhan comes with the information that Raman is the son of Veerabhadran. Then, Narasimhan and sons wait for a moment to slash him to death immediately after he steps out of the house as according to their tradition, not even a drop of blood should fall inside the house, if so, the goddess turns out to be evil. Later, Raman discovers that the father and sons are waiting to kill him, so he uses several tricks to stay inside the house to remain alive.

The next day he had to conditionally honour of the house as everyone had gone to the temple to attend Rajeev's and Krishna's engagement. After locking Suryasimhan in a room, he leaves the house with courage. But Chandrasimhan and his gang chase him with swords to kill him, but he runs quickly and evades them. Suryasimhan breaks the doors and windows and leaves the house.

Meanwhile, Krishna tells Rajeev that she cannot marry him as she is in love with Raman. She thought that her father and brothers chase him due to their love issues. So Rajeev sends Krishna back to Raman. Rajeev tries to console Narasimhan about the love between Raman and Krishna. Unable to control his anger, Narasimhan beats up Rajeev. Later, Raman meets Krishna during his run but soon confronted by Suryasimhan who is injured badly after his car goes out of control. Raman and Krishna reach a bridge and Krishna tells him that they should elope. It is then she realises that Raman was feared only due to his nearing death on the basis of Narasimhan's, Suryasimhan's and Chandrasimhan's revenge. Then, Narasimhan and sons came there with their gang to kill Raman. Raman was fearful at first but when he learned that Krishna was in love with him, he decides to sacrifice his fear and mustered courage. However, to avenge Indrasimhan's death Narasimhan, Suryasimhan and Chandrasimhan beat him up ruthlessly. When he was about to be beheaded, Krishna jumps onto the river in pain of losing him. Narasimhan and sons felt tensed about Krishna's condition. Raman rescues Krishna and Narasimhan and sons feel happy to have her back. Suryasimhan and Chandrasimhan decided to kill Raman as they thought that he was the root cause to all the problems. To everyone's surprise Narasimhan blocks his sons from killing Raman as he rescued Krishna while others were fearful to jump from a great height. As a result, Narasimhan and sons forget their past and revenge and Raman and Krishna unite.

In the end credits, Narasimhan's mother persuades him and his son to promise that they will never harm or kill anyone or even touch any harmful weapons. Raman and Krishna are seen going together on a bicycle.

== Cast ==
- Dileep as Puthukottayil Ramachandran (Ramu)
- Nikki Galrani as Kizhakkekottayil Krishnendu (Krishna)
- Nagineedu as Kizhakkekottayil Narasimhan (voiceover by Shammi Thilakan)
- Kailash as Dr. Rajeev
- Satyadev as Kizhakkekottayil Sooryasimhan, Narasimhan's eldest son
- Sudheer Sukumaran as Kizhakkekottayil Chandrasimhan, Narasimhan's second son
- Abu Salim as Rudran, Narasimhan's henchman
- Santhosh Keezhattoor as Puthukotayil Veerabhadran, Ramu's father
- Vadivukkarasi as Narasimhan's mother
- Thara Kalyan as Rajalakshmi, Narasimhan's wife
- Yamuna Mahesh as Sumithra, Ramu's mother
- Sunil Sukhada as Soman, Rajeev's father
- Ponnamma Babu as Jayabharathi, Rajeev's mother
- Kazan Khan as Mahesh Sharma
- S. P. Sreekumar as Broker
- Anand as Indrasimhan, Narasimhan's young brother
- Suraj Venjaramoodu as Hercules (Bicycle voice)
- Manju Satheesh as Suryasimhan's wife
- Tony Alex Valluvassery as the man who bought Hercules cycle
- Subbalakshmi as Muthassi
- Saju Navodaya as the fellow passenger

== Release ==
Ivan Maryadaraman released on 4 April 2015. This movie is the remake of 2010 movie Maryada Ramanna which starred Sunil and Saloni Aswani. Nagineedu reprised his role as the main antagonist.

== Reception ==
Times of India gave the film a rating of 3/5, stating that "it is one of the oldest plots in tinsel town - a film that banks on love between the younger generations of warring families interspersed with antiquated rituals and their attempts to kill each other. It gives you an eerie feeling of familiarity. However, the scriptwriters here are Udayakrishna and Siby K Thomas, who have managed to churn out profitable flicks by showcasing stupid villains, strained relations and romantic comedies."

The critic at NowRunning gave this film a rating of 2/5 stating "Measure it by any yardstick, and I'd still maintain that 'Ivan Maryadaraman' is certainly not my cup of tea. For that matter, neither is the Telugu original that it blatantly admits to have been inspired from."

== Soundtrack ==
The film's original songs were composed by Gopi Sundar.

Ivan Maryadaraman

Soundtrack album by Gopi Sundar
- Released: 2015
- Genre: Film soundtrack
- Length: 16:18
- Language: Malayalam
- Label: Satyam Audios

No.	Title	Lyrics	Singer(s)	Length
1.	"Ummarathe"	BK Harinarayanan	V. Devanand, Divya S. Menon	04:38
2.	"Ezhazhakulla"	BK Harinarayanan	Afsal, KS Maneesha	04:00
3.	"Choolamittu"	BK Harinarayanan	Vijay Yesudas, Divya S. Menon	04:36
4.	"Manushya Hridayam"	BK Harinarayanan	Gopi Sundar, Ajay Sen	03:04
Total length:				16:18
