= Pei Krishnan =

Indian actor and comedian (1958 or 1959 – 2024)

- Born: N. Gothandaraman; 1958 or 1959
- Died: 18 December 2024 (aged 65); Perambalur, Tamil Nadu, India
- Occupation: Actor
- Known for: Kalakalappu (2012)

N. Gothandaraman (or Kothandaraman; 1958 or 1959 – 18 December 2024), more popularly known by his stage name Pei Krishnan, was an Indian actor, comedian and stuntman who predominantly appeared in Tamil language films in comedy track sequences. He had also worked as a stunt master in Tamil cinema for over 25 years.

== Career ==
Gothandaraman initially joined Tamil cinema industry as a stunt master performing dupe stunt sequences for actors in action oriented sequences. He was one of the prominent members of the Stunt Union. He worked as stunt choreographer in films including Ellame En Pondattithaan (1998), Ellame En Rasathan (1995) and Once More (1997). He later ventured into acting in films predominantly in supporting roles. He worked as a co-stunt master in films including Bagavathi (2002), Kireedam (2007) and Vedalam (2015). He also acted in supporting roles in films including Bagavathi (2002), Thirupathi (2006), Kireedam (2007), Singam (2010) and Vedalam (2015). He was affectionately called Pei Krishnan among the film fraternity after portraying a character of a ghost in one of the films where he was cast in a supporting role.

He received his major breakthrough in Sundar C's directorial Kalakalappu (2012), where he had more scope for his acting and he shared screen space with fellow comedian Santhanam. His role as Thimingalam playing as a sidekick to Santhanam in Kalakalappu was well received by the audience. In Kalakalappu one of his comical sequences with Santhanam, where he comes out of water in search of Santhanam's love interest played by Anjali to say "Ammava puduchiten" (transl. I've caught her). This went onto become a viral meme template that began to trend in social media platforms after the popularity of the film surged post the theatrical release. Despite having received significant fanfare and fame through his performance in Kalakalappu, he refused to accept film acting opportunities. He rejected film roles following an accident where a mini lorry apparently ran over his leg, as he endured discomfort to locomote and thus it made him unable to walk for months, which was later confirmed by his fellow associate stuntman Thalapathy Dinesh to sources.

== Death ==
Gothandaraman died from a long illness in Perambalur, on 18 December 2024, at the age of 65. He had reportedly mentioned in several of his interviews that his family members and relatives had continued to abandon him ever since he underwent treatment for his illness. The Stunt Union reportedly cared for Gothandaraman during this period. Although his stage name Pei Krishnan was preferred by many in the film fraternity, upon the announcement of his death, most of the press media sources referred to him as Gothandaraman.

== Filmography ==
As stunt choreographer

- Ellame En Pondattithaan (1998)
- Ellame En Rasathan (1995)
- Once More (1997)

As actor

- Bagavathi (2002)
- Baba (2002) (uncredited) as Baba's henchman
- Gajendra (2004)
- Jyeshta (2005) (Kannada) as henchman
- Aaru (2005) (uncredited) as Reddy's henchman
- Thirupathi (2006)
- Parijatham (2006)
- Ninaithaley (2007) (uncredited)
- Kireedam (2007)
- Singam (2010)
- Velayudham (2011)
- Kalakalappu (2012)
- Theeya Velai Seiyyanum Kumaru (2013)
- Tenaliraman (2014) (uncredited)
- India Pakistan (2015)
- Eli (2015)
- Vedalam (2015)
- Virumandikkum Sivanandikkum (2016)
- Petromax (2019)
