= Aarumaname =

- Directed by: Sudheesh Sankar
- Written by: Dinesh Pallath (dialogues)
- Screenplay by: Sudheesh Sankar
- Story by: Dinesh Pallath
- Produced by: K. S. Rajan; R. S. Valsala Rajan
- Starring: Deepak; Nicole; Karthika Mathew
- Cinematography: Ambumani
- Edited by: V. Jai Sankar
- Music by: Srikanth Deva
- Production company: Al Shola Productions
- Release date: 31 July 2009
- Running time: 135 minutes
- Country: India
- Language: Tamil

Aarumaname is a 2009 Indian Tamil language action drama film directed by Sudheesh Sankar. The film stars Deepak, Nicole and Karthika Mathew, with Ganja Karuppu, Sudheer Sukumaran, Rajesh, Ponvannan, Sriman and Anand playing supporting roles. It was released on 31 July 2009.

== Plot ==
The film begins with Vaithi (Deepak) running to save his elder brother Moorthy (Sriman) from the goons. Upon his arrival, Moorthy is seriously wounded and covered with blood.

Vaithi lived with his father Arunachalam (Rajesh), a retired teacher; his mother; and his brother Moorthy. Moorthy was a successful CPWD engineer and the pride of Arunachalam, while Vaithi was a kind-hearted auto-driver and was hated by Arunachalam. Moorthy, being an incorruptible engineer, attracted the anger of Ratnavel (Sudheer Sukumaran) and Rajadurai (Ponvannan), who were constantly trying to bribe him to get his approval for a project. In the meantime, Vaithi and Anandhi (Nicole), sister of Ratnavel and Rajadurai, fell in love with each other. Circumstances forced Moorthy to get married with Thenmozhi (Mythili), but he didn't like her.

Back to the present, Moorthy dies in Vaithi's arms, but before dying, he pronounces the name Kadambari. Vaithi suspects Ratnavel and Rajadurai for killing his brother. A few days later, a woman (Karthika Mathew) with a baby introduces to Vaithi as Kadambari and reveals that she was Moorthy's secret wife. By pity, Vaithi accommodates them in Moorthy's outhouse. The whole village talks ill about Kadambari and Vaithi's relationship, but Vaithi keeps the secret and takes the insults of the village. Vaithi is now disowned by his father, and his girlfriend has broken up with him. One day, Periyasamy (Ganja Karuppu), who witnessed his brother's murder, reveals that the killer was Kadambari's brother Boopathy (Anand), a criminal. What transpires next forms the rest of the story.

== Cast ==
- Deepak as Vaithi
- Nicole as Anandhi
- Karthika Mathew as Kadambari
- Ganja Karuppu as Periyasamy and Chinnasamy
- Rajesh as Arunachalam
- Ponvannan as Rajadurai
- Sudheer Sukumaran as Ratnavel
- Sriman as Moorthy
- Anand as Boopathy
- Mythili as Thenmozhi
- Meera Krishnan as Vaithi's mother
- Master Krishna Sankar as Munna
- Thalaivasal Vijay as Samikannu
- Bava Lakshmanan
- Muthukaalai
- Arulmani as Sivasakthi

== Production ==
Nicole plays a village belle in the film, which was a contrast to her previous glamorous role. According to her, the film demanded a kissing scene that was shot aesthetically. Her father was against her doing an onscreen kiss for her previous film.

== Soundtrack ==
The soundtrack was composed by Srikanth Deva, with lyrics written by Snehan, Kabilan and Dr. Kruthiya.

Song	Singer(s)	Duration
"Maanattam Mayilattam"	Naveen Madhav	5:40
"Chithiram Pesuthadi"	Harish Raghavendra, Sadhana Sargam	5:32
"Aara Aariro"	Karthik	5:28
"Yaro Yaro"	Vijay	5:21
"Naan Kadhalikiren"	Shweta Mohan, Udit Narayan	5:10
"Aara Aariro"	Shweta Mohan	4:59

== Release ==
The film was released at the end of July in 2009.
