= Parijatham (2025 TV series) =

2025 Indian television series

- Genre: Drama; Romance
- Written by: Dialogues: Baskar Shakthi
- Screenplay by: Sarkunam Punkaraj
- Story by: Ashok Kumar
- Directed by: K. Manikandakumar
- Starring: Alya Manasa; Akshay Kamal; Swathi
- Music by: Hariharan
- Country of origin: India
- Original language: Tamil
- No. of episodes: 360

Production
- Producers: Sruthi Narayanan; Vinotha Narayanan
- Cinematography: Kesavan
- Editor: Arul
- Camera setup: Multi-camera
- Running time: 22–24 minutes
- Production company: Shruthi Studios

Original release
- Network: Zee Tamil
- Release: 8 September 2025 – present

Parijatham is a 2025 Indian Tamil-language Romance Melodrama television series starring Alya Manasa, Akshay Kamal and Swathi in lead roles. The story revolves around a deaf girl called Isai and forced to marry Vishal, who is passionate about music.

The show produced by Sruthi Narayanan and Vinotha Narayanan under the banner of Monk Studios and directed by K. Manikandakumar. It premiered on Zee Tamil on 8 September 2025, and airs on Monday to Saturday and streams digitally on ZEE5.

== Plot ==
The series follows the story of Isai, a young woman blessed with a melodious singing voice but faced with after losing her parents and hearing in a tragic accident, then raised by her relatives Krishanan and Rukumani, where her life becomes even more difficult because of her aunt Rukumanani. In this tough environment, Isai's only source of comfort and love is her cousin Varshini, who stands by her through thick and thin.

Subadra Devi, from a wealthy family and an astrologer with a strong belief in horoscopes, wants to find the perfect brides for her sons Raghav and Vishal. Hoping for wealth and status, Rukmini manipulates the astrological charts to ensure that Varshini is matched with Raghav, while Isai is forced to marry Vishal when her aunt Rukmini manipulates her horoscope to meet Subadra's strict astrological beliefs. Vishal is in love with another girl, but Vishal is forced to marry Isai because of his mother and horoscope.

However, Vishal is unaware of Isai's hearing impairment, their lives change when they learn the truth about Isai.

== Cast ==
=== Main ===
- Alya Manasa as Isai
- Rakshit Gopal / Akshay Kamal as Vishal
- Swathi as Subathra Devi

=== Recurring ===
- Smriti Kashyap / Sherin Janu as Sreeja
- Nithin Kumar Krishnamurthy as Raghav
- Shabeena as Varshnini
- Anjana Mishra as Chithamani
- Shiva Subramanian as Bhaskaran
- VJ Ayub as Ashok
- Koli Ramya as Dr. Yazhini
- Anuradha as Devaki
- Latha Rao / Ragavi Sasikumar as Rukmani
- Samritha as Pallavi
- Rajkanth as Krishanan
- Mahesh Prabha as Inspector Rathnavel
- Abhishek Shankar as Vijayaraghavan
- Ramesh Khanna as Vaidyanathan
- Deepa Nethran as Yazhini's mother
- Jeevitha Krishnan as Bhanumathi
- Keerthi Vijay as Deepthi
- Arvind Kathare as Ramakrishnan
- J. Livingston as Isai's grandfather

=== Special Appearances ===
- Nalini as Alankaaram
- Senthilnathan as Vanangamudi
- Munish Raja as Arun
- Deepa Shankar as Pattammal
- Soodhu Kavvum Sivakumar as Balaraman
- Sanjay Kumar Asrani as Parthiban
- Nanjil Sampath as Himself
- Kavitha Solairaja as Parameshwari
- Swaminathan as Sankaran
- Ajay Rathnam as Sreeja's acting father
- Anitha Venkat as Meenatchi
- Ambika as Doctor Mithra
- Meera Krishna as Doctor Narmada
- Sona Heiden as Governor of Tamil Nadu
- Raviprakash as Palani (fake Ashok)
- Ashika Padukone as Maari
- Bhargavi Eshwaramoorthy as Ramya
- Gayatri Jayaraman as Amman
- Unknown as Aadhi Lakshmi
- Mohan Vaidya as Subramani
- Fathima Babu as Poongothai

== Production ==
=== Casting ===
After Iniya, Alya Manasa made a comeback through this series as "Isai", whilst Kannada television actor Rakshit made his Tamil debut as Vishal but he left the series and is replaced by Akshay Kamal. Swathi was cast as Subathra.

Nithin Kumar Krishnamurthy was cast in another male lead role of Raghav after his notable performances in Endrendrum Punnagai. Smriti Kashyap cast was as Srija, who is in love with Vishal, however she left the show resulting in Sherin Janu to play the role.

=== Release ===
The first promo was released on 9 August 2025, which introduced the main characters of the series. The second promo was unveiled on 22 August 2025, featuring Subathra's past life story and main plot of the series.
