= Gundamma Gaari Manavadu =

2007 Telugu film directed by B. Jaya

- Theatrical release poster
- Directed by: B. Jaya
- Written by: Polur Ghatikachalam (dialogues)
- Screenplay by: B. Jaya
- Produced by: R. R. Venkat
- Starring: Ali; Sindhuri; Nicole
- Cinematography: Purna Kandru
- Music by: Vandemataram Srinivas
- Production company: R. R. Movie Makers
- Release date: April 28, 2007
- Country: India
- Language: Telugu

Gundamma Gaari Manavadu (Mrs. Gundamma's grandson) is a 2007 Indian Telugu-language film directed by B. Jaya and starring Ali, Sindhuri, and Nicole. The film was released on 28 April 2007. The film was commercially successful and ran for fifty days.

== Plot ==
The title is suggestive of a grandmother-grandson relationship. Yedukondalu (played by comedian Ali) is looked after by his grandmother Gundamma (Vadivukkarasi) after his mother's death while his father, Srisailam (Tanikella Bharani) is an alcoholic. Ali falls in love with Mahalakshmi (Sindhuri), whose father Neelakanta (Kota Srinivasa Rao) is a greedy person and wants his would-be son-in-law to own a hotel. With the help of his grandmother (she sells off her jewellery) Yedukondalu sets up a hotel.

Neelakatna reluctantly agrees to the match but later calls off the wedding after receiving a better marriage proposal for his daughter. Yedukondalu is beaten up and dumped on the railway track. Injured, he nevertheless rescues a girl (Nicole) stuck in a car on the tracks. Together they join hands to set up a successful restaurant. Yedukondalu then distances himself from Mahalakshmi. Whether he ends up with her makes up the rest of the story.

== Cast ==
- Ali as Edu Kondalu
- Sindhuri as Mahalakshmi
- Nicole
- Kota Srinivasa Rao as Neelakanta
- Vadivukkarasi as Gundamma
- Tanikella Bharani as Srisailam
- Jayalalita
- Narsing Yadav
- Mallikarjuna Rao as priest
- Venu Madhav as boxer
- Gundu Hanumantha Rao
- Duvvasi Mohan
- Gundu Sudarshan
- AVS as priest
- Kondavalasa
- Jr. Relangi
- Krishna as Sabari, Mahalakshmi's father (guest appearance)

== Soundtrack ==
The soundtrack was composed by Vandemataram Srinivas.

Track listing
No.	Title	Lyrics	Singer(s)	Length
1.	"Bhale Bhaleti Mandu"		Tanikella Bharani	2:15
2.	"Brahme Eduruga Vachi"	Paidisetty Sriram	N. C. Karunya	3:21
3.	"Chengavi Rangu Cheera"	Kaluva Krishna Sai	Raghu Kunche, Sunitha Upadrashta	4:25
4.	"Mahalakhmi"	Paidisetty Sriram	Jassie Gift	4:38
5.	"Okkasari Okkasari"	Baladitya	Jassie Gift, Kalpana	4:47
6.	"Orori Edukondalu"		Chakri, Kousalya	4:10
7.	"Ye Devuni"	Paidisetty Sriram	N. C. Karunya	2:40
Total length:				26:16

== Reception ==
A critic from Rediff.com rated the film one-and-a-half out of five stars and wrote that "Jaya seems to have got carried away by the commercial format resulting in an out of sync effect. Overall an average film."
