= Yuvaraj Dhayalan =

Indian film director and screenwriter

- Born: Chengalpattu, Tamil Nadu, India
- Occupations: Film director Screenwriter
- Years active: 2011–Present

Yuvaraj Baiju Dhayalan is an Indian film director and screenwriter who works in Tamil cinema.

== Career ==
Dhayalan made his directorial debut with the cricket comedy film Potta Potti (2012), starring Sadagoppan Ramesh. It received positive reviews.

In 2014, he directed the historical comedy Tenaliraman starring Vadivelu. Dhayalan collaborated with Vadivelu a second time for the 2015 film Eli, which released to negative reviews and was a box office bomb.

In 2023, he directed the romance film Irugapatru, which became a box office success.

== Filmography ==
Key
†	Denotes film or TV productions that have not yet been released

Year	Film	Notes
2011	Potta Potti	
2014	Tenaliraman	
2015	Eli	
2023	Irugapatru	
