= Swathi (actress) =

Indian actress

- Born: 23 October 1978 (age 47); Hyderabad, India
- Occupations: Actress, model
- Years active: 1995–present
- Spouse: Kiran (m. 2009)
- Children: 1

Swathi is an Indian actress who has appeared in a few Tamil, Kannada, Hindi and Telugu films.

== Career ==
She made her film debut with the film Deva in 1995 opposite Vijay. Swathi shared the screen space with Ajith Kumar in Vaanmathi (1996) directed by Agathiyan.

After the success of Vaanmathi, Swathi returned to Hyderabad to complete her education and turned down film offers. She played opposite Vijay in Vasantha Vaasal (1996) and Selva (1996). She played a supporting role with Prabhu in Mappillai Gounder (1997).

After a few films in Tamil, she debuted in Hindi with Mithun Chakraborty and Suman Ranganathan in Hatyara (1998). In the same year, she joined hands with Ajith in Unnai Thedi (1999) directed by Sundar C. She was cast opposite Ramarajan in Annan (1999).

In 2000, Swathi was seen in a Hindi film Qurbaniyaan. The same year, she paired opposite Mithun Chakraborty in Justice Chowdhary. Swathi got a small yet meaty role in Yajamana, a Kannada film with Vishnuvardhan. In 2003, she shared the screen space with Vijayakanth in Chokka Thangam directed by K. Bhagyaraj. In 2004, she was seen in Thendral in a supporting role. In this movie, Swathi shared the screen space with R. Parthiban. In 2008, she played a supporting role in Ezhuthiyatharadi.

She was last seen in Ameer's Yogi in 2009 and she chose to bid adieu to the acting career. In 2025, she makes a comeback in Tamil serial Parijatham as one of the a main role.

== Personal life ==
She married a company director, Kiran, on 2 December 2009 at Maruthi Gardens, Red Hills in Hyderabad. The couple have one son.

== Filmography ==
| Year | Film | Role | Language | Notes |
|---|---|---|---|---|
| 1995 | Deva | Bharathi | Tamil | |
| 1995 | Aata Hudugata | Anuradha | Kannada | |
| 1996 | Vaanmathi | Vaanmathi | Tamil | |
| 1996 | Gajanura Gandu | Ranjini | Kannada | Credited as Narmada |
| 1996 | Vasantha Vaasal | Divya | Tamil | |
| 1996 | Vishwanath | Swathi | Tamil | |
| 1996 | Selva | Sumathi | Tamil | |
| 1997 | Thaali | Ganga | Telugu | |
| 1997 | Mappillai Gounder | Amsavalli | Tamil | |
| 1997 | Priyamaina Srivaru | | Telugu | |
| 1997 | Vammo Vatto O Pellaamo | | Telugu | |
| 1997 | My India | Jyothi | Tamil | |
| 1997 | Nattupura Nayagan | Ranjani | Tamil | |
| 1998 | Sundara Pandian | Karthika | Tamil | |
| 1998 | Thulli Thirintha Kaalam | Swathi | Tamil | Special appearance |
| 1998 | Hatyara | Professor Kajol | Hindi | |
| 1999 | House Full | Stella | Tamil | |
| 1999 | Unnai Thedi | Chitra | Tamil | |
| 1999 | Annan | Sundari | Tamil | |
| 1999 | Ponvizha | Parvathi | Tamil | |
| 1999 | Sivan | Shenbagam | Tamil | |
| 2000 | Qurbaniyaan | Professor Kajol | Hindi | |
| 2000 | Justice Chowdhary | Saritha | Hindi | |
| 2000 | Yajamana | Dr. Keerthi | Kannada | |
| 2001 | Asathal | Catherine | Tamil | |
| 2001 | Sonnal Thaan Kaadhala | Saro | Tamil | |
| 2003 | Chokka Thangam | Gowri | Tamil | |
| 2003 | Chandu | | Telugu | Credited as Archana |
| 2004 | Thendral | Sundari | Tamil | |
| 2004 | Seshadri Naidu | Seshadri Naidu's sister | Telugu | |
| 2004 | Kadhale Jayam | Chithra | Tamil | |
| 2007 | Thangiya Mane | Lakshmi | Kannada | |
| 2008 | Ezhuthiyatharadi | Roja | Tamil | Dubbed into Telugu as Premistu |
| 2009 | Yogi | Caroline | Tamil | |
| 2009 | Sankham | | Telugu | |

== Television ==
| Year | Show | Notes | Channel |
|---|---|---|---|
| 2025–present | Parijatham | Subathra Devi | Zee Tamil |
