= Gajendra (2004 film) =

- DVD cover
- Directed by: Suresh Krishna
- Screenplay by: S. S. Rajamouli
- Story by: V. Vijayendra Prasad
- Based on: Simhadri by V. Vijayendra Prasad
- Produced by: V. A. Durai
- Starring: Vijayakanth; Flora; Laya
- Cinematography: V. Prathap
- Edited by: K. Thanigachalam
- Music by: Deva
- Production company: Tamilanai Cine Creation
- Release date: 17 September 2004
- Running time: 158 minutes
- Country: India
- Language: Tamil

Gajendra (spelt onscreen as Gajendraa) is a 2004 Indian Tamil-language action film directed by Suresh Krishna and produced by V. A. Durai. The film stars Vijayakanth, Flora, and Laya. It is a remake of Telugu film Simhadri. The music was composed by Deva with cinematography by V. Prathap and editing by K. Thanigachalam. The film was released on 17 September 2004 and failed at the box office.

== Plot ==
Gajendra (Vijayakanth), an orphan and kindhearted man, grows up under Azhagarsamy's (Sarath Babu) family in Chennai. Gajendra and Azhagarsamy share a father-son bond. Kasthuri (Flora Saini) is Azhagarsamy's granddaughter, and she develops feelings towards Gajendra. Once a week, Gajendra meets a mentally challenged girl Indhu (Laya). He entertains her and provides money for her caretakers. When Azhagarsamy and his wife (Lavanya) discover that Kasthuri wants to marry Gajendra, Azhagarsamy decides to get them married. He makes a formal announcement to officially adopt Gajendra. At this time, it is revealed that Gajendra is very close to Indhu. The alliance breaks off when Gajendra refuses to leave Indhu (who is suspected to be his mistress).

Meanwhile, two separate groups are in search of Gajendra. They find him at the banks of the Kaveri River along with Indhu. In the ensuing confrontation between one group of gangsters and Gajendra, Azhagarsamy and his family are surprised to see that Gajendra, who used to be calm and composed, is ruthlessly killing many rowdies without mercy. Meanwhile, Indhu gets injured. Gajendra is helped by the second group, who call him "Andhra Gaja". When Indhu comes back to her senses, she remembers her past, and the first thing she does is stab Gajendra with an iron pole. Gajendra is hospitalized in critical condition. The leader of the second group, who was searching for Gajendra, explains the "Andhra Gaja" story in a flashback.

In the flashback, it is revealed that Azhagarsamy's oldest daughter Mahalakshmi (Seetha) elopes with her lover, a Hyderabadi named Aravind (Rajeev). After some harsh words and saddened over Azhagarsamy's rejection over her choice to marry her love, they both settle in Andhra Pradesh. Learning of the sadness surrounding Azhagarsamy and his wife, Gajendra takes up the job of uniting the family and visits Hyderabad. He joins the medical and spiritual therapy spa operated by Mahalakshmi and her family under the disguise of a patient.

He finds that Indhu is Azhagarsamy's first granddaughter. He convinces the separated family to reunite and ask for forgiveness. During this time, Mahalakshmi is killed by a local goon Chhota Babu (Rajat Bedi). A don named Rana (Nawab Shah) controls the mafia of Andhra Pradesh. Chhota and Rana are brothers. Gajendra takes the law into his hands and kills Babu and his small gang in Andhra Pradesh, thereby avenging Mahalakshmi's death. The local Andhra people start calling him "Andhra Gaja". In the ensuing scenes, Gajendra finds himself developing into "Gajendra", eradicating Rana's network and illegal activities. Indhu finds herself alone and constantly worrying about him. She proposes to her father that they should return to Tamil Nadu because she cannot stand their home without her mother, and Gajendra ignores her now.

Indhu and Aravind decide to return to Chennai. Gajendra receives a call that Indhu's father is carrying a bomb in his briefcase. Aravind is seen rushing to catch a moving train, and Indhu was about to lend him a hand. Unable to warn him, Gajendra has two choices: let Indhu's father die so people on the train can live, or let the bomb kill everyone on board, including Indhu and her father. Gajendra chooses the first option. As soon as Aravind catches the train bar handle, Gajendra shoots him in the back. Surprised at Gajendra's action, Indhu jumps off the train to catch her falling father, and she hits head against a pole, causing her amnesia and becoming mentally challenged.

After the flashback ends, people are seen and heard chanting Gaja Gaja outside the hospital. Rana and his men arrive at the hospital to finish off Gajendra, but Gajendra has gained consciousness, and with the help of his friends, police and family (now reunited), he takes down Rana and his army.

== Cast ==
- Vijayakanth as Gajendra / Andhra Gaja
- Flora as Kasthuri
- Laya as Indhu
- Sarath Babu as Azhagarsamy
- Nawab Shah as Rana
- Rajat Bedi as Chotta Babu
- Seetha as Mahalakshmi
- Rajeev as Aravind
- Radha Ravi as ACP Soukath Ali
- Ramesh Khanna as Pazhaniappan
- Vinu Chakravarthy as Peedhambaram
- Nizhalgal Ravi as Azhagarsamy's second son-in-law
- Lavanya as Azhagarsamy's wife
- Hema as Azhagarsamy's second son-in-law's wife
- Mahanadi Shankar as Goon
- M. S. Bhaskar as Fake Patient
- Raj Kapoor as Rana's henchman
- G. V. Sudhakar Naidu as Golfer
- Jenny as Priest
- Pei Krishnan as Goon
- Visweswara Rao as Religious man

== Production ==
The film was shot at locations in Rameswaram, Pushkarani, Tiruchandur, Vishakhapatnam, Rajahmundry, Thiruvananthapuram, Chennai, and Hyderabad for more than 90 days. One of the fight scenes was picturized in the forest areas near Thalakkonam within 15 days with 6 cameras, while another fight scene was shot in the Godavari river in five days in which a stuntman lost his life in the water. Another fight scene was shot at Rajahmundry with more than 6000 junior artistes and 6 cameras for 10 days while the film's climax fight was shot for 14 days.

== Soundtrack ==
The soundtrack was composed by Deva. It features 5 tracks but only two are placed in the film. "Gaja Varanda" was reused from Deva's own Kannada song "Banda Nodamma" for Kannada film Kadamba (2003) also directed by Suresh Krishna.

Track listing
No.	Title	Lyrics	Singer(s)	Length
1.	"Gaja Varanda"	Kabilan	Palakkad Sreeram	5:22
2.	"Unnai Paartha"	Pa. Vijay	S. P. B. Charan, Sharmili	4:38
3.	"Erumbu Onnu"	Pa. Vijay	Karthik, Anuradha Sriram	4:39
4.	"Ammavum Naane"	Pa. Vijay	Srinivas	4:43
5.	"Oorukku Mudhal Vanakkam"	Pa. Vijay	Deva	5:13
Total length:				24:02

== Release and reception ==
The film's release was postponed for some months; producer Durai's financial troubles and Vijayakanth's controversial statements against the Pattali Makkal Katchi (PMK) were said to be the reason for delays.

Sify said that the film is a "waste of time". Malathi Rangarajan of The Hindu called it "another Vijayakanth product that deifies the hero." Visual Dasan of Kalki noted many of the Vijayakanth's dialogues have indirect political overtones while also stating the film despite being remade from a Telugu film, it heavily reminds of Baashha and called the film a massive bore. Malini Mannath of Chennai Online wrote "It's a very focussed script with not many distractions, fast-paced and emotion-packed, keeping one glued to the screen for the most part". GU of Deccan Herald wrote "Vijayakanth tries hard to give a good performance mouthing political one liners but it looks like his acting days are coming to an end. He is too heavy, jaded and tends to repeat himself. The stunt scenes are too contrived and un natural. There are too many characters, too many sub plots and flashbacks and lot of violent scenes".
