= Sudheer Sukumaran =

Indian actor

- Citizenship: Indian
- Occupation: Actor
- Years active: 2002–present

Sudheer Sukumaran is an Indian actor who works primarily in Malayalam Film Industry. He is best known for his role in Kochi Rajavu and Dracula 2012.

== Filmography ==
Year	Title	Role	Notes	Ref.
2002	Thalaram			
2003	C.I.D. Moosa	Terrorist Jandu		
2004	Runway	Chinnadan Varkey's Son		
2005	Kochi Rajavu	Marimuthu		
2006	Lion	Sub Inspector		
2007	Inspector Garud	Guptaji's henchman		
2009	Moz & Cat			
2009	Malayali	Hamid		
2009	Aarumaname	Ratnavel	Tamil film	
2010	Yakshiyum Njanum	Shivashankara Menon		
2010	Kanyakumari Express	DSP Tirunelveli Muthuvel		
2010	Annarakkannanum Thannalayathu	Padmanabhan Nair's Son		
2011	Raghuvinte Swantham Raziya	Jamal (Amit Headley)		
2013	Dracula 2012	Roy Thomas/William D'Souza/Count Dracula		
2014	Bhaiyya Bhaiyya	Manikandan		
2015	Ivan Maryadaraman	Chandrasimhan		
2015	Lailaa O Lailaa	Sahel		
2016	Welcome to Central Jail	Kodanadu Vishwanathan		
2016	Thoppil Joppan	SI George Thomas		
2017	1971: Beyond Borders	Pakistan Major General Balukha Khan		
2018	Chanakya Thanthram	Krishna Murthy		
2019	Mamangam	Irama		
2023	Class by a Soldier	Balu		
2024	Once Upon a Time in Kochi			
2024	DNA	Charlie		
2024	Bad Boyz	Althara "Thara" Ambadi		
2024	Gumasthan			
2025	Sree Ayyappan			

== Controversy ==
In 2014, Sukumaran claimed that the director Vinayan had paid him a low remuneration of ₹96,000 for Dracula 2012 despite making ₹5-crore profit.
