= Habibi Dah (Nari Narain) =

"Habibi Dah (Nari Narain) (حبيبي ده (ناري نارين"

Single by Hisham Abbas

from the album Habibi Dah
- Released: 2001
- Genre: Arabic pop
- Label: Delta Sounds, EMI
- Songwriter: Hisham Abbas

"Habibi Dah (Nari Narain)" (Arabic: حبيبي ده (ناري نارين ), romanized: That's My Love (My Fire is Two Fires)) is a popular Hindi-Arabic bilingual song by Egyptian singer Hisham Abbas, with parts of the song sung in Hindi by Indian singer Jayashri also featuring actress Riva Bubber. The single went platinum in Egypt and won the award for Best Video at the Egyptian Oscars. the song is featured in the 2001 Pakistani film Sangram.
