= Riva Bubber =

Indian actress

- Born: Mumbai, India
- Occupations: Model, actress
- Years active: 1996–2018

Riva Bubber is an Indian actress. After featuring in the Indian Arabic pop song Habibi Dah in 2001 Bubber made her debut as an actress with the role of Nikita in television series Kyun Hota Hai Pyarrr. Afterwards, she joined Kyunki Saas Bhi Kabhi Bahu Thi where she played the role of Damini. She is also known for her portrayal as Shabana Ghulam Haider in Beintehaa, Vimmi in Ram Milaayi Jodi and Priyamvada in Suryaputra Karn.

== Early life ==
Riva Bubber was born in Mumbai, India to Ruby Bubber. She is of Punjabi descent and the youngest of three children.

== Filmography ==
Year	Film	Role	Language	Notes
1996	Selva	Kamini	Tamil	Credited as Reeva
1997	Roja Malare	Malarvizhi	Tamil	Credited as Reeva
2018	Pad Man	Lakshmi Prasad's neighbour	Hindi	

=== Television ===
Year	Serial	Role
2002–2004	Kyun Hota Hai Pyarrr	Nikita / Nikki Sharma
2003–2008	Kyunki Saas Bhi Kabhi Bahu Thi	Damini Gautam Virani
2004–2005	Ayushmaan	Dr. Kavya
2004–2005	Karma – Koi Aa Rahaa Hai Waqt Badalney	Mrinal
2005	Kkavyanjali	Sonia
2005–2006	K. Street Pali Hill	Smriti / Simran / Damini resembles Mansi
2010–2012	Ram Milaayi Jodi	Vimmy Bedi
2013–2014	Beintehaa	Shabana Ghulam Haider
2015	Suryaputra Karn	Priyamvada
