= Hisham Abbas =

Egyptian pop singer (born 1963)

Hisham Abbas هشام عباس
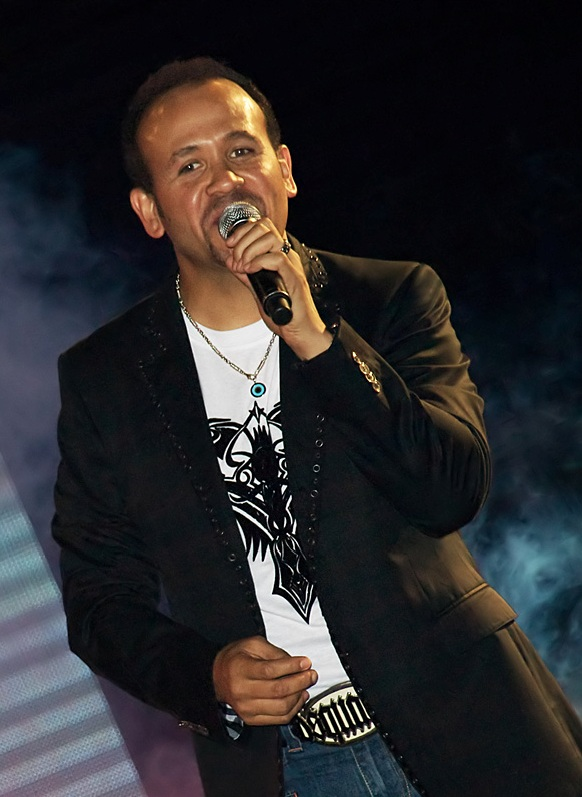
- Hisham Abbas performing at the International Garden, Cairo, Egypt (July 15, 2008)

Background information
- Also known as: Hisham Abbas
- Born: Mohammad Hisham Mahmoud Mohammad Abbas; September 13, 1963 (age 62); Cairo, Egypt
- Origin: Shoubra, Egypt
- Genres: Arabic pop, Egyptian music
- Occupations: Actor, singer
- Years active: 1977–1978; Pats Band; 1978–present Solo Artist
- Label: Alam El Phan (2002–2007; 2019-present)

Mohammad Hisham Mahmoud Mohammad Abbas (Arabic: محمد هشام محمود محمد عباس; born September 13, 1963), commonly known as just Hisham Abbas ([heˈʃæːm ʕæbˈbæːs]), is an Egyptian pop singer best known for his hit song "Habibi Dah (Nari Narain)" and his religious song "Asmaa Allah al-husna".

== Biography ==
Hisham Abbas was born in Cairo, Egypt. He had his primary education at Dar El Tefl school. Later on he enrolled in American University in Cairo and graduated with a major in mechanical engineering.

Abbas' career bloomed later on to release several songs. He became popular in the early 1990s with successful hits like "Wana Wana Wana", "Eineha El Sood", "Ta'ala", "Ya Leila", "Shoofi" and his most successful hit, "Habibi Dah (Nari Narain)" featuring Indian singer Jayashri. He currently has 10 solo studio albums to his credit. He received a number of awards, the most notable being Orbit's Arabic Song Award in 1997.

== Discography ==
=== Studio albums ===
- Aamel Dagga (2019)
- Matbatalesh (2009)
- Ta'ala Gamby (2007)
- Sebha Tehebbak (2004)
- Gowwa F Alby (2002)
- Habibi Dah (2001)
- Kalam El Leil (1999)
- Shoufi (1999)
- Habaitha (1998)
- Ya Leila (1997)
- Gawabak (1996)
- Zay El Awel (1995)
- Hisham 95 (1995)
- Ard El Sharq (1994)
- Ta'ala (1994)
- Hisham (1992)
- Halah (1992)
- Fainoh
- Sahara

=== Collections/Compilations ===
- Ahla Ma Ghanna Hisham Abbas / From The Best of Hisham Abbas
- Atfal
- Hisham Abbas Collection'

=== Singles ===
- "Habibi Dah (Nari Narain)
- " [ Halet Hob ( Valentine's Day ) ]
