= T. M. Jayamurugan =

Indian film director and producer (died 2025)

- Born: Jayamurugan Muthusamy; Tamil Nadu, India
- Died: 18 January 2025
- Occupations: Film director, producer
- Years active: 1997–2023

T. M. Jayamurugan (died 18 January 2025) was an Indian film director and producer, who directed Tamil-language films. He rose to fame through Roja Malare (1997), and went on to make feature films including the dramas Adada Enna Azhagu (2009) and Thee Ivan (2023).

== Life and career ==
Jayamurugan first entered the Tamil film industry as a producer, making Sindhu Bath (1995) through his production house Manithan Cine Arts. Jayamurugan made his directorial debut through the romantic drama film Roja Malare (1997) starring Murali, Arun Pandian and Anand Babu in the lead roles. Prior to release, the film garnered attention for its shoot in St. Mary's Islands. Upon release, the film received mixed reviews from film critics. In the late 1990s, he made a film called Poonguyile with Livingston, Udhaya and Vindhya, which was shelved after several schedules.

Jayamurugan re-emerged in the late 2000s by directing Adada Enna Azhagu (2009) starring Jai Akash and Nicole. The film opened to negative reviews, with a critic from Sify noting "there is nothing to recommend in the film. Keep away". Entertainment portal Behindwoods.com rated the film 0.5 out of 5 and wrote, "Adada Enna Azhagu is so fake and out of place that you end up feeling you are time-transported two decades earlier".

In early 2020, Jayamurugan announced another comeback and noted that he was making a film titled Thee Ivan (2023) with Karthik and his son, Suman, in the lead roles. He noted that he would keep the livelihood of people hailing from the Kongu Seemai region as the backdrop, and that it would deal with the bond between a brother and sister. The film eventually had a delayed release in 2023, with a song from Sunny Leone added to the project.

Jayamurugan died from a heart attack on 18 January 2025.

== Filmography ==
Year	Title	Credited as			Notes
Year	Title	Director	Producer	Composer	Notes
1995	Sindhu Bath	No	Yes	No	
1997	Roja Malare	Yes	No	No	
2009	Adada Enna Azhagu	Yes	No	Yes	
2023	Thee Ivan	Yes	No	Yes	
