= Adada Enna Azhagu =

- Poster
- Directed by: T. M. Jayamurugan
- Written by: T. M. Jayamurugan
- Produced by: Gowri Ramaswami
- Starring: Jai Akash; Nicole
- Cinematography: Kitchas
- Edited by: S. Surajkavee
- Music by: T. M. Jayamurugan; Jeevan Thomas
- Production company: Alipirie Movie Productions
- Release date: 20 March 2009
- Running time: 160 minutes
- Country: India
- Language: Tamil

Adada Enna Azhagu (transl. Wow, how beautiful) is a 2009 Tamil-language romance film directed by T. M. Jayamurugan. The film stars Jai Akash and newcomer Nicole, with Sarath Babu, Ashish Vidyarthi, Karunas, Aishwarya, Rekha, Aarthi and Mahadevan playing supporting roles. It was released on 20 March 2009. The film was also dubbed into Telugu as Aaha Entha Andam and into Hindi as Tum Ho Sabse Haseen.

== Plot ==
Vasan (Jai Akash) is the son of the psychiatrist Vaikam (Sarath Babu), who runs a mental hospital while Nisha (Nicole) is the daughter of the Defence Minister Alexander (Ashish Vidyarthi). Vasan is an avid fan of music but he pursues a MBBS course for fulfilling his father's wish. Before the graduation ceremony, Vasan shares with his friend (Karunas) the best moments he had during his college life. Last year, Nisha (Nicole) joined the medical college as a last year student. Vasan fell in love at first sight with his co-student Nisha and they even became friends. Nisha eventually fell in love with him but they couldn't express their love.

At the graduation ceremony, Vasan and Nisha received gold medals from the hands of their fathers but they still cannot declare their love. One day, goons try to kidnap Nisha and her father saves her but, in the process, Nisha suffers a head injury. She is admitted to Vaikam's hospital as a mental patient. Vaikam suggests her father that music therapy might cure her mental illness and Vasan cures her by singing a song. Alexander is grateful to them so he is ready to give them anything in return for saving his daughter. Vasan and his parents then make a marriage proposal and Vasan tells Alexander that he was in love with Nisha. Alexander, who thinks that money and prestige are more important than anything else, turns down the offers and insults them. Thereafter, Vasan kidnaps Nisha but Alexander uses his powers and they are caught: Nisha is locked in her bedroom while Vasan is held by police officers.

Vasan manages to escape from the police and releases his lover Nisha. Goons who want to kidnap Nisha, Alexander's henchmen and police officers are in pursuit of the young lovers. Afterwards, Alexander changes his mind and approves for their love marriage.

== Cast ==
- Jai Akash as Vasan
- Nicole as Nisha
- Sarath Babu as Vaikam
- Ashish Vidyarthi as Alexander
- Karunas as Vasan's friend
- Aishwarya as Diana, Nisha's mother
- Rekha as Vasan's mother
- Aarthi as Nisha's friend
- Mahadevan as Mahadevan
- Satya Prakash
- A. Mathiazhagan
- Chitti Babu as Security guard
- Unistar Manohar as Security guard
- LIC Narasimhan
- Vimalathithan
- Kaviyanban
- N. Sundarrajan
- Bellie as Bellie
- Jasmin
- Vengal Rao
- Raghuvaran as himself (cameo appearance)

== Production ==
Nicole played a glamorous role in the film and performed her own stunt of jumping off of the seventh floor of a building.

== Soundtrack ==
Adada Enna Azhagu

Soundtrack album by T. M. Jayamurugan Jeevan Thomas
- Released: 4 March 2009
- Recorded: 2008
- Genre: Feature film soundtrack
- Length: 35:35
- Producers: T. M. Jayamurugan; Jeevan Thomas

The film score and the soundtrack were composed by T. M. Jayamurugan and Jeevan Thomas. The soundtrack, released in 4 March 2009, features 7 tracks with lyrics written by T. M. Jayamurugan.

Track	Song	Singer(s)	Duration
1	"Adada Enna Azhagu"	S. P. Balasubrahmanyam, Gopika Poornima	4:47
2	"Unnai Enakku"	Hariharan	5:05
3	"Ulaga Azhagellam"	Shankar Mahadevan, Karthik	4:19
4	"Kummu Kummu"	Tippu, Suchitra, Kalyani	5:18
5	"Deepavali"	Mano, Harish Raghavendra, Mukesh Mohamed, Kalyani, Saindhavi, Anuradha Sriram	5:27
6	"Nisha"	Aslam Mustafa	5:12
7	"Theeratha"	Mukesh Mohamed	5:27

== Critical reception ==
Sify said, "There is nothing to recommend in the film. Keep away". A reviewer rated the film 1.75 out of 5 and stated, "The director has come out with a routine romantic tale and though the presentation was somewhat okay, the narrative lacked the finesse".
