= Tenaliraman (film) =

2014 Indian film by Yuvaraj Dhayalan

- Theatrical release poster
- Directed by: Yuvaraj Dhayalan
- Written by: Aaroor Dass (dialogues); Yuvaraj Dhayalan
- Produced by: Kalpathi S. Aghoram; Kalpathi S. Ganesh; Kalpathi S. Suresh
- Starring: Vadivelu; Meenakshi Dixit
- Cinematography: Ramnath Shetty
- Edited by: Raja Mohammed
- Music by: D. Imman
- Production company: AGS Entertainment
- Distributed by: AGS Entertainment
- Release date: 18 April 2014
- Running time: 116 mins
- Country: India
- Language: Tamil
- Budget: ₹35 crore (equivalent to ₹61 crore or US$6.3 million in 2026)
- Box office: ₹23 crore (equivalent to ₹40 crore or US$4.2 million in 2026)

Tenaliraman (previously titled Jagajala Pujabala Tenaliraman) is a 2014 Indian Tamil-language historical comedy film directed by Yuvaraj Dhayalan. Vadivelu stars in this film in dual roles. Meenakshi Dixit plays the pivotal role in the film. The film released to negative reviews.

== Plot ==
Tenaliraman is an intelligent guy and a rebel leader who is fighting a battle against Maamannar Krishnadevarayar the King who has no time for his people and is controlled by his corrupt ministers. The king with 36 wives and 52 children believes his nine ministers are Navarathnams (nine jewels) of his court. Soon Tenaliraman is able to infiltrate into the court as he is able to charm the king with his all-round talents including singing, dancing, sharp wit and amazing sense of humor. Meanwhile, other ministers in the court sell out to the Chinese who want to take over the kingdom and expand their market. Tenaliraman comes to the king's rescue and whether he does it single-handedly forms the rest of the story.

== Cast ==
- Vadivelu as Tenali Raman/Maamannar (The King of Vikata Nagaram)
- Meenakshi Dixit as Princess Maadhulai (voice-over by Deepa Venkat)
- Radha Ravi as Parasbaram, ruler of a rival kingdom
- Manobala as Education Minister
- Rajesh as Eating Joint Owner
- Santhana Bharathi as Ex Chettiar/Man carrying bags of rice on cart
- Bose Venkat as Kaaliappa, Tenaliraman's comrade
- Joe Malloori as Nandivarma Rayar
- G. M. Kumar as Chief Minister, the head of the navarathnams (nine jewels)
- Bala Singh as Naganadha, One of the ministers
- Namo Narayana as Environmental Minister
- Krishnamoorthy as Health Minister
- Chelladurai as One of the Ministers
- King Kong as Street dancer/Beggar
- Muthukaalai as Vendor in the street
- George Maryan as Eating Joint worker
- Besant Ravi as Leader of the thief gang
- Bava Lakshmanan as One of the Ministers
- Nellai Siva as Maamannar's soldier
- Jangiri Madhumitha as Kongana Valli, one of the 36 queens
- Devadarshini as Eating Joint Owner's Sister
- Amritha Aiyer as Maadhulai's friend
- Baby Neha as one of Maadhulai's Sisters

Uncredited

- Shanmugarajan as One of the Ministers
- Mansoor Ali Khan as Cannibal tribe leader
- Scissor Manohar as Beggar who acts like a blind person
- Halwa Vasu as Candidate for Nandivarma Rayar's post
- Pei Krishnan as Whipper
- Nickson Cheng as Chao Gong Gong, leader of the Chinese traders
- Vivienne Tseng as Courtesan Hong
- Wilson Ng as General Wang
- Minnale Ravi as Royal Barber
- Sumathi as Villager

== Production ==
Principal photography began on 20 May 2013 under the working title Jagajala Pujabala Thenaliraman. Meenakshi Dixit was selected to play the female lead in this film. The film's first look was shown via stills in October 2013, much to the delight of Vadivelu's fans, confirming that the shooting of the film was underway. Portions of the film were also shot in China and Hyderabad, but the news of shooting the film in China was however clarified by Vadivelu as untrue, "We had plans to go to China and shoot. But that didn't materialize because of time constraints. We, however, overcame that issue by getting Chinese actors from Singapore to come down here and shoot." The scenes in the film have extensive CGI (computer-generated imagery) work. The work is about 95 minutes of the running time of the film.

== Music ==
Tenaliraman

Soundtrack album by D. Imman
- Released: 1 April 2014
- Genre: Film soundtrack
- Language: Tamil
- Label: Sony Music
- Producer: D. Imman

D. Imman chronology
Amara (2014)	Tenaliraman (2014)	Yennamo Yedho (2014)

D. Imman composed the music for the film and singer Shreya Ghoshal had sung a track penned by Viveka. The song was one of the high points in the film. Apparently, Vadivelu himself had crooned a number as well and that he had done a terrific job in singing the song. Singer Krishnaraj had also delivered a song. Singer and actress Andrea Jeremiah had sung a Middle Eastern flavoured number and furthermore, Imman had confirmed that the soundtrack of the film will consist of 5 songs and 3 theme songs and that a 70's kind of feel would be present in each track. Talking about the music of the film Imman posted on his Twitter page "Tenaliraman audio is designed to achieve the sound of early 60's and 70's. Melody making and orchestration is set to the period with the mix and master of today's digital sound. This film's music did take me for a time travel and hope it does with the listeners too." The audio of the film was launched on April Fool's Day. Imman had tweeted, "The background score is in full swing, and nearing completion. I'm sure u guys gonna love Vadivelu sir back on screen! Audio on April 1". In addition to Viveka, Puthumaipithan's lyrics were also used.

The album received mixed reviews from critics, many of whom felt that the songs would look better on screen. Behindwoods gave 2/5 saying, "Imman's usual magic is missing". Only Kollywood gave it 2.75/5 praising Imman's experimental songs, particularly "Aanazhagu", but finally stating that the songs overall were mediocre by Imman's standards. Therarefield gave a mixed review stating, "Tenaliraman captures the yesteryear ambience in its sounds to mixed results". Cinemagrind gave 2.5/5 saying, "Staying true to the script, Imman has no freedom to experiment. Average vintage album!" Nevertheless, songs like "Aanazhagu" and "Rampappa" became instant hits among the masses. Indiaglitz wrote, "The usual Imman touch is missing".

Tracklist
No.	Title	Lyrics	Singer(s)	Length
1.	"Aanazhagu"	Viveka	Shreya Ghoshal
2.	"Aey Vaayadi"	Viveka	Krishnaraj
3.	"Udal Vaangalaiyo"	Viveka	Andrea Jeremiah
4.	"Nenje Nenje"	Viveka	Hariharasudan
5.	"Rampappa"	Pulamaipithan	Mukesh, Vadivelu
6.	"Aanazhagu (Karaoke)"
7.	"Udal Vaangalaiyo (Karaoke)"
8.	"Nenje Nenje (Karaoke)"

== Release ==
The film, initially set for release on 11 April 2014, was postponed to release a week later on 18 April 2014. The film released across 16 countries worldwide. It released in 19 screens in the US and 12 in the United Kingdom. The satellite rights of the film were secured by Sun TV.

=== Promotion ===
The official 3-minute trailer for the film was released on 27 March 2014. In its trailer review, Behindwoods wrote "However, for now, Vadivelu is back. Dum.".

=== Marketing ===
In an interview with Sun TV on 14 April 2014, Vadivelu mentioned that the idea of the King having 36 wives and 52 children was based on Ziona Chana, who lives in Baktawang village of the Mizoram state of India and who holds the world record for the world's biggest family with 39 wives, 94 children, 14 daughters-in-law and 33 grandchildren, 181 in total. Commenting on the film, the film's director Yuvaraj spoke of how much faith Vadivelu has put in him and he efforts he made in the film, "There are several reasons for viewers to watch this film. The first is Vadivelu sir. My film will mark his return to cinema after a two-year break. He will be seen in dual roles and both roles will make you smile. To differentiate between the two characters he plays in the film, Vadivelu sir created a different body language for one of the characters. For instance, he created a different walking and talking style for a particular character. In fact, he would blink several times more while playing this character. It was amazing to see the way he transformed himself. Vadivelu sir received several offers, but he chose my film to mark his comeback and gave me the opportunity to work with him. I am just 27 years old. When some top heroes are scared to trust youngsters, he has shown that he has immense faith in the youth of this country." he said Actress Meenakshi Dixit was aware of the fact that the film did not feature a regular hero, yet she agreed to work in the film because she didn't want to miss an opportunity to work with Vadivelu, "I was told by many people not to do this film but my heart was all for it. I was sure about one thing that maybe I'm not working with a regular hero but I will not get an opportunity to work with a legendary comedian. Moreover, the movie concentrates more on the content rather than just the hero. I'm very proud to be a part of such a prestigious project by a great production house. Working with him was an experience of a lifetime. I have learnt a lot from him. He is the most humble and grounded person I have ever met in my life. It was a challenge to match the comic timing of Vadivelu because he would improvise randomly on sets. I would have practiced my lines for hours and then when we do the scene, everything would have been improvised by Vadivelu. So, catching up with him was a challenge." she said Furthermore, Vadivelu stated, "This is a very good film, one people must watch," he said and added, "I am sure they will like it. I wanted to mark my return with a film that would stand out. And I chose this script after listening to several others. We have added some imaginary events to short stories we know and have shot the film in a manner that will not hurt anybody's feelings or sentiments," he said. Pointing out to him that his director Yuvaraj was grateful that he had been entrusted with the task of directing a film that marked his return to cinema and he replied, "Today's youngsters are full of passion. This youngster was like camphor. If I began narrating a scene, he would complete it for me. He is sharp and has a bright future. He might be 26, but has the wisdom of a 62-year-old. I've realized that one must never dismiss or underestimate anybody just because they are young. In fact, I have worked as an assistant director to him in this film. My producer has placed a lot of faith in me. Despite several people trying to dissuade him from making this film, he has backed me. I am grateful for the support he has extended." he said.

=== Allegations of depiction of historical figures ===
Certain Telugu associations had written to the Censor Board seeking the removal of any scene that degrades Tenali Raman, the legendary minister in King Krishnadevaraya's court. The organisations had petitioned the censor board to appoint an expert committee of Andhra historians to check the movie. It was understood that he plays the roles of Tenali Raman and his King Krishnadevaraya. In his interview to a leading National newspaper, the film's director, Yuvraj Dhayalan had clarified that Vadivelu had not acted as King Krishnadevaraya in his film. He also added that his film was not based on any real incidents and it was a summation of a few moral stories about Tenaliraman. Commenting on the issue, the director of the film, Yuvaraj Dhayalan had said that he was ready to screen his film to any committee that had raised concerns and that they could very well ask him to show the film to them. He confirmed that there will be no scenes that will degrade Tenali Rama and that the Censor Board had looked into all the concerns posed by the Telugu associations and cleared the film with a 'U' certificate without any cuts. He furthermore said that the film has been in the making for a very long time and people knew very well that Vadivelu was acting in it and that they should have raised this concern some six months ago and not around the time of the release of the film and that the intentions of the entire team of the film was not to hurt anyone's sentiments. Addressing the concerns raised by the Telugu groups, Vadivelu himself also stated that there was no mention of the Krishnadevaraya in the film and that the word "Manna" only was used to address the King throughout the film. An official statement signed by R. Rangarajan, director of AGS entertainment, which produces the film, stated that the film is an imaginary story conceived on the basis of Tenaliraman's moral stories and that the film doesn't reflect neither the life history of Tenaliraman nor that of any person with whom Tenaliraman was associated with/lived with and that the story of the film is an imaginary one reflecting the lifestyle of people who lived in the 15th century in the backdrop of the present happenings and events and that all the characters appearing in the film are fictitious. The Telugu groups moved to the High Court on Friday and also sought the intervention of the Tamil Nadu government. On Friday, two Telugu organisations filed a writ petition in the Madras High Court seeking a direction to the Tamil Nadu Government to pass appropriate orders on their representation with regard to the film. The petitioners, Tamil Nadu Telugu Makkal Peravai and Tamil Nadu Telugu Yuva Sakthi, said that the film's producer had not considered the facts about King Krishnadevaraya and that they had produced the movie with its own ideology. "History should not be twisted;" the petitioners said. At a press meet in the city, representatives of various Telugu organisations said they were also attempting to make a representation to the Chief Secretary seeking a halt to the release of the film. "Tenaliraman is a historic character who was a poet in the court of Krishnadevaraya, a great king. But the trailer of this film shows the king as a person who has many wives and children, and ignored his subjects." Thangavel Swamy of Sillavar Rajakambalam Naicker Sangam, one of the protesting groups, said. The petition also stated to the film's producers to screen the movie to its representatives or authorities appointed by the court before the movie's release so as to be sure of what the movie contained. The petition was taken up for hearing on 11 April 2014 by Justice Satish Kumar Agnihotri (acting Chief Justice) and Justice M. M. Sundaresh. Justice Sathish Kumar Agnihotri said that since he did not know Tamil, he could not judge about the contents of the film. Hence he had posted the petition to another division bench.

=== Clearing of the film ===
On 16 April 2014, a division bench consisting of Justices N. Paul Vasanthakumar and M. Sathyanarayanan refused to stall the release of the film but asked its producers to prominently display a disclaimer at the beginning of the film stating that it was a fictional work and that it was not intended to hurt the sentiments of religious or any other groups. Earlier, the producer had filed an affidavit stating that there was no mention of King Krishnadevaraya anywhere in the movie and pointed out that the Madurai bench of the high court had already dismissed a similar PIL.

=== Support for the film ===
Director and political activist Seeman and directors Bharathiraja and V. Gowthaman supported the film, the latter terming the allegations as systematic attacks to prevent the film's release.

== Reception ==
=== Critical reception ===
Hindustan Times gave 2/5 and wrote, "Vadivelu does make an effort to look and sound different in the two roles, varying his body language – to appear dignified as the king and comical as the jester" and concluded that, "Tenaliraman is meant for Vadivelu fans and is a good movie for the summer." S. Saraswathi of Rediff gave 2/5 and wrote, "Performance wise, there is little scope for anyone other than Vadivelu. Though the film is set in the 15th century, the issues dealt with are quite contemporary such as foreign direct investment, rampant corruption and bribe-giving and receiving. Director Yuvaraj has tried to present a socially relevant issue in a humorous manner." Sify wrote, "On the whole, Tenaliraman is a perfect family outing this summer, as some laughs are guaranteed. Watch it for Vadivelu!". The Deccan Chronicle gave 3/5 stars and wrote, "Clearly the film rests entirely on Vadivelu's shoulders. He delivers a noteworthy performance both as the king and as Tenali, but it is the character of Maamannar that draws the most laughs from the audience." The Times of India gave 2.5/5 stars and wrote, "Tenaliraman is amusing, especially if you like loud comedy." The New Indian Express wrote, "Vadivelu uses suitable body language and expressions to demarcate the two roles – of a simpleton king, unaware of the real state of his people and of the scheming by his ministers; and of the witty shrewd Tenali who brings the king to his senses. What makes the film watchable is Vadivelu's screen presence." Baradwaj Rangan of The Hindu wrote, "Vadivelu's timing is intact. He has a terrific scene where he spouts gibberish, unable to put together words to describe his plight." Siddarth Srinivas of Cinemalead gave 2.5/5 stars and wrote, "Copacetic period comedy highlighted by Vadivelu's performance." Indiaglitz gave 2.5/5 stars and concluded, "Tenaliraman is an enjoyable light-hearted entertainer." Behindwoods gave 2.5/5 stars and wrote, "In all, Tenaliraman, as a standalone film, may find patrons in family audiences and children and may come across as a welcome break for this summer vacation." Moviecrow gave 2.75/5 and concluded, "Tenaliraman is mounted on a political platform and successfully gets away without setting off land mines. However, Tenaliraman looks like a poor cousin of Imsai Arasan and lacks some genuinely interesting moments and necessary sting that is quintessential to political satires. Nevertheless, Tenaliraman is watchable only for Vadivelu!".

=== Box office ===
The film collected 3.2 million in worldwide alone during its first week of release (from 18 April 2014 to 20 April 2014). It collected 2.65 million in its second week (from 21 April 2014 to 27 April 2014). The film collected 2.2 million in its third week (from 28 April 2014 to 4 May 2014). The films collected 0.32 million in its fourth week (from 5 May 2014 to 11 May 2014), therefore taking the box office tally in Worldwide to 22.9 million. The final verdict by Behindwoods was "Average".
