= Selvaa (film) =

- Poster
- Directed by: A. Venkatesan
- Screenplay by: A. Venkatesan
- Story by: Majeeth
- Produced by: Pavithran
- Starring: Vijay; Swathi; Riva; Raghuvaran
- Cinematography: S. Saravanan
- Edited by: B. Lenin; V. T. Vijayan
- Music by: Sirpy
- Production company: A. R. S. International
- Release date: 12 December 1996
- Running time: 120 minutes
- Country: India
- Language: Tamil

Selvaa is a 1996 Indian Tamil-language romantic action film directed by A. Venkatesan, and produced by Pavithran. It stars Vijay, Swathi, Riva and Raghuvaran. The music is composed by Sirpy. The film was released on 12 December 1996, and became a successful venture.

== Plot ==
The film opens with blasting a commercial ship orchestrated by industrialist Varatharajan. On the other side, Selvaa is a young man looking for a job living in a working class colony. It is here that Varatharajan comes to meet him and is revealed that he is indeed Selvaa's father and requests him to come back as all the assets he has earned is for Selvaa, but the latter insists that he wants to create a name for himself; and he did not move out of spite and the two remain best of friends. Selvaa is unaware of the other side about his father. He falls in love with Sumathi from the same colony.

On his way to the interview for a job with the police force, he witnesses a murder on the street - which was carried out under the instructions of Varatharajan. Selvaa chases the goons but is unsuccessful but eventually performs very well in the police interview. However, Varatharajan uses his influence to block Selvaa from getting the job as he did not want Selvaa to end up investigating him. Instead, he arranges a job for him with the Tamil Nadu Tourism Development Corporation (TTDC) as a tour guide.

News breaks that the hanging of a terrorist, the son of Muhammad Vaappa was to happen soon, and in revenge, Muhammad Vaappa plans to assassinate the Home Minister at an event in Tamil Nadu. However, Selvaa happens to be at the event as the TTDC representative and saves the Home Minister, that he is scheduled to be felicitated for his bravery at an orphanage. It is here that he learns that he was an orphan and Varatharajan is his adoptive father, that Selvaa's respect for him even grows further.

He is then assigned to be a tour guide for the daughter of the president of foreign country, named Kamini (who spoke fluent Tamil) - and Selvaa takes her around Tamil Nadu - and at Ooty, they all happen to meet his neighbours of the colony, whom Kamini starts to adore. She decides to spend the rest of her stay in India in the colony under extreme security - much to the jealousy of Selvaa's lover Sumathi. However, Kamini tells Sumathi how Selvaa is a gentleman and that his heart only has room for her, that she is convinced.

Vaappa's son is executed and it is revealed that he is the adoptive father of Varatharajan, and both plot to kidnap Kamini, to tarnish India's image. While the colony is under heavy protection, Selvaa and Kamini successfully manage to sneak out to visit Varatharajan in the hospital as he was sick. However, on their way back, Varatharajan's henchmen disguise as commandos and take Kamini with them, while Selvaa assumes that he has sent her with full protection.

This leads to suspicion from the police and they arrest Selvaa for being a terrorist from Vaapa's group. He is tortured by the CBI Officer during the interrogation and she tells him that he lacks patriotism, at which point Selvaa goes on a long monologue to express his patriotism - that the officer decides to release him and is convinced that he would help in tracking down Kaamini.

He manages to track them down near a waterfall is shocked to find his father Varatharajan there, and Selvaa begs him to release Kaamini and change his ways but Varatharajan does not relent on his loyalty towards Vaappa. In the pursuing fight, Selvaa severely injures Vaappa but Varatharajan tries to cut the rope that would drop Kamini into the waterfall. Selvaa finally chooses country over family and fatally attacks Varatharajan. Vaappa tries to shoot Selvaa and Kamini but the CBI arrive just in time, shoot and thank Selvaa for his service to the nation, with the film ending with all of them saluting the tricolour, including the foreigner Kamini.

== Cast ==
- Vijay as Selva
- Swathi as Sumathi
- Riva as Kamini
- Raghuvaran as Varatharajan, Selva's father
- Rajan P. Dev as Vaappa
- Senthil as Magic Guruji
- Manivannan as Cellular Mani Selva s friend (voice dubbed by Mayilsamy for some scenes)
- Jayachitra as CBI officer
- Vichithra as Jothi
- Shanmugasundari as Deaf grandmother
- C. R. Saraswathi as Bhama, Sumathi's mother
- Vatsala Rajagopal as Church mother
- Mannangatti Subramaniam as Gopalu, Sumathi's father
- Tiruppur Ramasamy as Ramasamy
- Kalidoss as Varatharajan’s assistant
- Jayaprakasam as Soosai
- Diamond Babu as Kamini’s father
- Krishnamoorthy as Deputy inspector general of police
- Bonda Mani as Colony man
- Prathapachandran as Director general of police
- Peter Hein as Fighter
- A. Venkatesh as Vaappa's henchman

== Production ==
Vijay performed a risky jump stunt in the film without using a double.

== Soundtrack ==
All songs were written by Vaali and music was composed by Sirpy.

Title	Singer(s)	Length
"Chicken Kari"	Vijay, Sirpy, Swarnalatha	5:02
"Don't Care Master"	Mano	3:46
"Lappu Tappu"	Suresh Peters, Swarnalatha, Deepika	4:41
"Potta Pulla Manasu"	Mano, Sujatha	4:46
"Tharaiyil Natakkuthu"	S. P. Balasubrahmanyam, Swarnalatha	4:43

== Reception ==
Ananda Vikatan rated the film 30 out of 100. R. P. R. of Kalki praised Vijay for acting with life and performing stunts and called Raghuvaran's performance as the only entertaining thing from the film but felt the film had no plot and two of the actresses were underutilised.
