= Roja Malare =

- DVD cover
- Directed by: T. M. Jayamurugan
- Written by: T. M. Jayamurugan
- Produced by: Nirmaladevi Jayamurugan
- Starring: Murali; Reeva; Arun Pandian; Anand Babu
- Cinematography: A. Venkatesh
- Edited by: L. Kesevan
- Music by: Adithyan
- Production company: Kamalam Movies
- Release date: 5 December 1997
- Running time: 150 minutes
- Country: India
- Language: Tamil

Roja Malare (transl. Oh, rose) is a 1997 Indian Tamil-language romantic drama film directed by T. M. Jayamurugan. The film stars Murali, Reeva, Arun Pandian and Anand Babu. It was released on 5 December 1997.

== Plot ==
Kannan is a singer in a musical ensemble with his friends. Kannan falls in love with, a college student, Malarvizhi but he cannot express his love. Malarvizhi gets engaged with Arun, a strict businessman. Will Malarvizhi accept Kannan's love forms the rest of the story.

== Cast ==
- Murali as Kannan
- Reeva as Malarvizhi
- Arun Pandian as Arun
- Anand Babu as Anbu
- Senthil as Babu
- Madhan Bob
- Sathyapriya as Lakshmi
- Kottai Perumal
- Shobaraj
- T. M. Jayamurugan

== Production ==
Songs from the film were shot at St. Mary's Islands.

== Soundtrack ==
The soundtrack was composed by Adithyan, with lyrics written by T. M. Jayamurugan. The song "Azhagoviyam" attained popularity.

Song	Singer(s)	Duration	Lyrics
"Anandam Vandadhadi"	Mano	4:41	
"Azhagoviam (Lovely Lisa Monalisa)"	S. P. Balasubrahmanyam	5:49	T. M. Jayamurugan
"Bombay Reeva"	Mano	5:07	
"Kettavaram"	Mano	4:16	
"Poopupuva"	S. P. Balasubrahmanyam	6:15	
"Rojamalarin"	Jeemon KJ	4:56	
"Udhayathu"	Jayachandran	5:27	

== Reception ==
A writer for Indolink wrote, "The fact that all these stars [Murali, Arunpandian, Anandbabu and Reeva] packed up to picturize the songs in St. Mary's Island seems to be the sole asset to this film". Two years after release, the producers were given a ₹5 lakh subsidy by the then Chief Minister of Tamil Nadu M. Karunanidhi along with ten other films.
