= List of Tamil films of 1993 =

Post-amendment to the Tamil Nadu Entertainments Tax Act 1939 on 1 April 1958, Gross jumped to 140 per cent of Nett Commercial Taxes Department disclosed ₹82 crore in entertainment tax revenue for the year.

A list of films produced in the Tamil film industry in India in 1993 by release date:

== Movies ==
Opening		Title	Director	Cast	Production	Music Director	Ref
J A N	14	Aadhityan	V. L. Bashkaraaj	R. Sarathkumar, Sukanya	Vellore Film Associates	Gangai Amaran	
J A N	14	Captain Magal	Bharathiraja	Raja, Khushbu	Manoj Creations	Hamsalekha	
J A N	14	Sinna Mapplai	Santhana Bharathi	Prabhu, Sukanya, Sivaranjani	Amma Creations	Ilaiyaraaja	
J A N	14	Jaathi Malli	K. Balachander	Mukesh, Khushbu, Vineeth, Yuvarani	Kavithalayaa Productions	Maragadha Mani	
J A N	14	Koyil Kaalai	Gangai Amaran	Vijayakanth, Kanaka, Goundamani, Senthil	Ambaal Pictures	Ilaiyaraaja	
J A N	14	Maamiyar Veedu	S. Ganesaraj	Saravanan, Selva, Sithara, Nandhini	Karpaga Jothi Films	Ilaiyaraaja	
J A N	14	Marupadiyum	Balu Mahendra	Revathi, Arvind Swamy, Nizhalgal Ravi, Rohini	Ashwin International	Ilaiyaraaja	
J A N	14	Mutrugai	Manobala	Arun Pandian, Bhanupriya, Ranjitha	Sri Varalakshmi Cine Productions	Siddhartha	
J A N	14	Walter Vetrivel	P. Vasu	Sathyaraj, Sukanya, Ranjitha, Goundamani	Kamalam Movies	Ilaiyaraaja	
J A N	29	Chinna Kannamma	R. Raghu	Karthik, Gautami, Suhasini, Nassar, Shamili	Geetha Chithra Combines	Ilaiyaraaja	
F E B	5	Dasarathan	Raja Krishnamoorthy	R. Sarathkumar, Heera	Aalayam Productions	L. Vaidyanathan	
F E B	5	En Idhaya Rani	S. S. Vikram	Anand Babu, Geetharani	Anandham Movies	S. S. Vikram	
F E B	5	Rakkayi Koyil	Manivasagam	Selva, Kasthuri, Goundamani, Senthil	Patel Cine Arts	Ilaiyaraaja	
F E B	12	Manikuyil	Rajavarman	Murali, Saradha Preetha, Goundamani, Senthil	Yaghava Productions	Ilaiyaraaja	
F E B	12	Pudhu Piravi	Prem	Prem, Rohini	A Lotus Film Company	Deva	
F E B	18	Yajaman	R. V. Udayakumar	Rajinikanth, Meena, Aishwarya, Goundamani, Senthil	AVM Productions	Ilaiyaraaja	
F E B	19	Ezhai Jaathi	Liaquat Ali Khan	Vijayakanth, Jaya Prada	Chinnibhavan Cine Creations	Ilaiyaraaja	
F E B	19	Mudhal Paadal	Arul Krishnan	Madhu, Monisri	Sree Amman Creations	S. A. Rajkumar	
F E B	24	Madurai Meenakshi	P. Amirtham	Selva, Ranjitha, Sujatha	Poomalai Productions	Deva	
F E B	25	Suriyan Chandiran	K. S. Ravikumar	Anand Babu, Keerthana, Saravanan	Ayyannar Cine Arts	Deva	
M A R	5	Maharasan	G. N. Rangarajan	Kamal Haasan, Bhanupriya, Goundamani, Senthil	Kumaravel Films	Ilaiyaraaja	
M A R	12	Pudhu Vayal	Nanjil Kennedy	Nanjil Kennedy, Kasthuri		Aravind	
M A R	19	Malare Kurunji Malare	A. Parthiban	Raja Venkatesh, Seetha		Raveendran	
A P R	2	Iniyaraja	V. Ganesh Pandian	Ravikiran, Subhala	I. Kumar Creations	V. S. Narasimhan	
A P R	9	Amma Ponnu	Arun	Vignesh, Akhila, Goundamani, Senthil	Anand Cine Arts	Ekandhan, Siva	
A P R	9	Enga Thambi	S. D. Sabha	Prashanth, Subhashri	Sathya Movies	Ilaiyaraaja	
A P R	9	Pon Vilangu	K. S. Rajkumar	Rahman, Ranjith, Ramya Krishnan, Sivaranjani	RK Productions	Ilaiyaraaja	
A P R	10	Pettredutha Pillai	Poorna Chandran	Saravanan, Sithara, Pandiyan, Rohini	Chimbu Cine Arts	T. Rajendar	
A P R	14	Kalaignan	G. B. Vijay	Kamal Haasan, Bindiya, Sivaranjani	Sivaji Productions	Ilaiyaraaja	
A P R	14	Minmini Poochigal	Raghuvyas	Bharath, Yuvarani, Napoleon	P. R. J. Films	Adithyan	
A P R	14	Uthama Raasa	Raj Kapoor	Prabhu, Khushbu, Goundamani, Senthil	K. B. Films	Ilaiyaraaja	
A P R	16	Aranmanai Kili	Rajkiran	Rajkiran, Ahana, Gayathri	Red Sun Art Creations	Ilaiyaraaja	
A P R	16	Ponnumani	R. V. Udayakumar	Karthik, Soundarya, Goundamani, Senthil	Thaai Sakthi Productions	Ilaiyaraaja	
A P R	16	Pratap	Arjun	Arjun, Khushbu	Sreeram Films International	Maragadha Mani	
A P R	16	Ulle Veliye	Parthiban	Parthiban, Aishwarya	AC Abi Creations	Ilaiyaraaja	
M A Y	6	Madhumathi	Agathiyan	Ravi Rahul, Madhumitha	Anbalaya Films	Deva	
M A Y	6	Vedan	Suresh Krissna	R. Sarathkumar, Khushbu	Sathya Jyothi Films	Deva	
M A Y	14	Paadhukaappu	S. A. Chandra Mohan	Charan Raj, Abhilasha, Varunraj, Charmila	Abhilasha Creations	Maharaja	
M A Y	21	Porantha Veeda Puguntha Veeda	V. Sekhar	Sivakumar, Bhanupriya, Goundamani, Senthil	Thiruvalluvar Kalaikoodam	Ilaiyaraaja	
M A Y	28	Idhaya Nayagan	J. Rajkamal	J. Rajkamal, Roopa Sree	Twin Films	Deva	
M A Y	28	Pudhiya Mugam	Suresh Chandra Menon	Suresh Chandra Menon, Revathi, Vineeth, Kasthuri	Tele Photo Films	A. R. Rahman	
J U N	4	Amaravathi	Selva	Ajith Kumar, Sanghavi	Chozha Creations	Bala Bharathi	
J U N	4	Thangakkili	Rajavarman	Murali, Shali	A. G. S. Movies	Ilaiyaraaja	
J U N	10	Sakkarai Devan	Paneer	Vijayakanth, Sukanya	I. V. Cine Productions	Ilaiyaraaja	
J U N	11	Gokulam	Vikraman	Jayaram, Bhanupriya, Arjun	J. K. Combines	Sirpy	
J U N	12	Konjum Kili	T. P. Gajendran	Raghuvaran, Srividya	Sree Abhirami Arts	S. A. Rajkumar	
J U N	18	Munarivippu	R. S. Boovan	R. Sarathkumar, Heera	Supreme Movies	Deva	
J U N	24	Rajadhi Raja Raja Kulothunga Raja Marthanda Raja Gambeera Kathavaraya Krishna Kamarajan	Balu Anand	Mansoor Ali Khan, Nandhini, Napoleon	Raj Kennedy Films	Mansoor Ali Khan	
J U N	24	Uzhaippali	P. Vasu	Rajinikanth, Roja	Chandamama Vijaya Combines	Ilaiyaraaja, Karthik Raja	
J U N	25	Kattalai	Liaquat Ali Khan	Sathyaraj, Bhanupriya	Sri Thirumala Art Productions	Ilaiyaraaja	
J U N	25	Pathini Penn	R. C. Sakthi	Ranjan, Rupini, Chithra	Best Friends Creations	M. S. Viswanathan	
J U L	2	Band Master	K. S. Ravikumar	R. Sarathkumar, Heera, Ranjitha, Goundamani, Senthil	A. G. S. Movies	Deva	
J U L	2	Nallathe Nadakkum	K. Shankar	Saravanan, Kaveri, Rohini	Valliyandan Pictures	Deva	
J U L	2	Thanga Pappa	R. Aravindraj	Ramki, Shamili	Aarthi Films	Deva	
J U L	9	Maathangal Ezhu	Yugi Sethu	Yugi Sethu, Ramya Krishnan	Vivek Chithra Productions	Vidyasagar	
J U L	9	Naan Pesa Ninaipathellam	Vikraman	Anand Babu, Mohini, Anand	Vasantham Creations	Sirpy	
J U L	16	Dharma Seelan	Cheyyar Ravi	Prabhu, Khushbu, Geetha, Goundamani, Senthil	Anandhi Films	Ilaiyaraaja	
J U L	16	Kadal Pura	Babu Ganesh	Babu Ganesh, Kuyili	Angalamman Movies	Babu Ganesh	
J U L	23	Pass Mark	V. Balakrishnan	Ramki, Kasthuri, Nandhini	Sri Lakshmi Balaji Films	Deva	
J U L	30	Athma	Prathap K. Pothan	Rahman, Ramki, Gautami	Supriya International	Ilaiyaraaja	
J U L	30	Gentleman	Shankar	Arjun, Madhubala, Subhashri, Goundamani, Senthil	A. R. S. Film International	A. R. Rahman	
A U G	15	Maravan	Manoj Kumar	Prabhu, Khushbu	Sree Rajakaali Amman Enterprises	Deva	
A U G	15	Udan Pirappu	P. Vasu	Sathyaraj, Sukanya, Rahman, Kasthuri	Raj Films International	Ilaiyaraaja	
A U G	20	Thalattu	T. K. Rajendran	Arvind Swamy, Sukanya, Sivaranjani, Goundamani, Senthil	Kiran Films	Ilaiyaraaja	
A U G	20	Valli	K. Natraj	Rajinikanth, Priya Raman, Hariraj, Sanjay	Rajini Arts	Ilaiyaraaja	
A U G	27	Varam Tharum Vadivelan	Shanmuga Sidhan	K. R. Vijaya, Rajesh, Radha Ravi	Mass Media International	S. A. Rajkumar	
S E P	10	Sivarathiri	Rama Narayanan	Shobana, Shamili, Sarath Babu	Sri Ragavendar Film Circuits	Shankar–Ganesh	
S E P	18	Moondravadhu Kann	Manivannan	R. Sarathkumar, Nizhalgal Ravi, Raja, Monisha	Gi. Di. En. Art Films	Deva	
S E P	25	Poranthalum Ambalaiya Porakka Koodathu	N. K. Viswanathan	Pandiarajan, Aishwarya	Meenakshi Films	Bala Bharathi	
O C T	2	Dhool Parakuthu	K. Hariharan	Raghuvaran, Sindhuja, Ramya Krishnan	Sri Sabarimala Enterprises	M. S. Viswanathan	
O C T	7	Karuppu Vellai	Manobala	Rahman, Sukanya	Chandamama Vijaya Combines	Deva	
O C T	8	Akkarai Cheemayile	Radha Bharathi	Saravanan, Devaki	A. K. M. Productions	Deva	
O C T	8	Otta Pandhayam	S. Navaraj Chelliah	Soundarya Kumar, Anupriya, S. Navaraj Chelliah	N. L. G. Creations	S. Navaraj Chelliah	
O C T	13	Rajadurai	S. A. Chandrasekhar	Vijayakanth, Jayasudha, Sivaranjani	Rowther films	Deva	
O C T	15	I Love India	Pavithran	R. Sarathkumar, Tisca Chopra, Shenbagam	Sri Sai Thejaa Films	Ilaiyaraaja	
O C T	15	Karpagam Vanthachu	R. Krishnamurthy	Arjun, Radhika	Shyamalaya Productions	Shankar–Ganesh	
O C T	15	Dhuruva Natchathiram	Raja	Arjun, Pallavi, Goundamani, Senthil	Ajantha Creations	Ilaiyaraaja	
O C T	23	Parvathi Ennai Paradi	V. Sekhar	Saravanan, Sri Parvathi	KRG Movies International	Ilaiyaraaja	
N O V	13	Chinna Jameen	Raj Kapoor	Karthik, Sukanya, Vineetha, Goundamani, Senthil	K. B. Films	Ilaiyaraaja	
N O V	13	Enga Muthalali	Liaquat Ali Khan	Vijayakanth, Kasthuri	P. A. Art Productions	Ilaiyaraaja	
N O V	13	Kattabomman	Manivasagam	R. Sarathkumar, Vineetha, Goundamani, Senthil	Raja Pushpa Pictures	Deva	
N O V	13	Kilipetchu Ketkava	Fazil	Mammootty, Kanaka	M. G. Pictures	Ilaiyaraaja	
N O V	13	Kizhakku Cheemayile	Bharathiraja	Vijayakumar, Radhika, Napoleon, Vignesh	V Creations	A. R. Rahman	
N O V	13	Muthupandi	A. Raja Pandian	Saravanan, Shenbagam		Deva	
N O V	13	Paarambariyam	Manobala	Sivaji Ganesan, Saroja Devi, Pandiyan, Nirosha, Chithra	Sasivarnam Films	Shankar–Ganesh	
N O V	13	Pudhiya Thendral	Prabhakar	Ramesh Aravind, Sivaranjani, Radhika	Seventh Channel Communications	Devendran	
N O V	13	Sabash Babu	Sasi Mohan	Heera, T. Rajendar, Silambarasan	S. R. M Arts Productions	T. Rajendar	
N O V	13	Thiruda Thiruda	Mani Ratnam	Prashanth, Anand, Heera	Aalayam Productions	A. R. Rahman	
N O V	13	Uzhavan	Kathir	Prabhu, Bhanupriya, Rambha	Sai Shanthi Movies	A. R. Rahman	
D E C	3	Kathirukka Neramillai	Kulothungan	Karthik, Khushbu, Sivaranjani	Mass Media International	Ilaiyaraaja	
D E C	3	Purusha Lakshanam	K. S. Ravikumar	Jayaram, Khushbu	Good Luck Films	Deva	
D E C	3	Rojavai Killathe	Suresh Krissna	Arjun, Khushbu	Sukumar Art Combines	Deva	
D E C	9	Airport	Joshiy	Sathyaraj, Gautami	Madhu Films International	S. P. Venkatesh	
D E C	11	Kizhakke Varum Paattu	Radha Bharathi	Prashanth, Charmila	Apple Creations	Deva	
D E C	24	Senthoorapandi	S. A. Chandrasekhar	Vijayakanth, Vijay, Gautami, Yuvarani	B. V. combines	Deva	

== Dubbed films ==
- Periyavar- 01.01.1993
- Sivappu chandran- 01.01.1993
- Jilla rowdy - 14.01.1993
- Ashokan- 19.02.1993
- Keezhakkarai Viswanath - 12.03.1993
- Kadamai - 19.03.1993
- Suriya Puthran - 26.03.1993
- Maanbumigu Maesthri - 14.04.1993
- Latchiyam - 14.04.1993
- Yenakkenna Bayam? - 30.04.1993
- Devar Vamsam - 07.05.1993
- Thalaivar Pondatti - 04.06.1993
- Narasimma Nayakkar - 04.06.1993
- Gang War - 16.07.1993
- Inspector Aswini - 30.07.1993
- Maravar Maghal - 15.08.1993
- Devar Samrajyam - 03.09.1993
- Aadi Amavasai - 10.09.1993
- Akkarai Seemaiyile - 08.10.1993
- Ottappandhayam- 08.10.1993
- Police Lock-Up 13.11.1993
- Commander -17.12.1993

Opening	Title	Director(s)	Original film		Cast	Ref.
Opening	Title	Director(s)	Film	Language	Cast	Ref.
24 December	Ilam Nenje Vaa	K.Rushendra Reddy	Tholi Muddhu	Telugu	Divya Bharati, Prashanth Thiagarajan	
