= Ibrahim Rowther =

Indian film producer and writer (1952–2015)

- Born: A S Ibrahim Rowther; 1952; Madurai, Madras State, India
- Died: 22 July 2015 (aged 63); Chennai, Tamil Nadu, India
- Occupations: Film Producer, writer
- Years active: 1987-2015
- Spouse: Fathima
- Children: 1
- Awards: Kalaimamani

Ibrahim Rowther was an Indian film producer and writer who had worked on Tamil language films. He was a close friend of Tamil actor and politician Vijayakant. He produced films under the studios Rowther Films, Tamilannai Cine Creation and IV Cine International.

== Career ==
Ibrahim Rowther launched his first film, Uzhavan Magan in 1987 to promote his friend Vijayakanth as an actor in the Tamil film industry. Vijayakanth subsequently garnered several bigger offers, and regularly collaborated with Ibrahim during his acting career.

In the late 1990s, Ibrahim took up a key administrative role in the Tamil Film Producers Council and later served as its president. His production house, Rowther Films, began to fail in the late 1990s and films such as K.Paarthasarathy's Unakkum Enakkum Kalyanam featuring Livingston and Devayani were put on hold.

In 2000, Ibrahim Rowther announced five new films as a part of a comeback after the slowdown. He created a new banner known as Kamban Kalaikoodam, and planned to collaborate with directors he had already worked with. He announced films including Manobala's Naan Paada Ninaippathellam featuring Ramesh Aravind, Swarnamalya and Suhasini; Senthilnathan's Kadhal Mudal Kadhal Varai featuring Bala Kumaran and Uma; J. Panneer's Enakkoru Snehithi featuring Hamsavardhan and Rishi; A. R. Ramesh's Daddy featuring Raghuvaran; and R. Aravindraj's Pesum Vizhigal featuring Jaishankar's son Jaivijay. None of the films materialised owing to financial problems.

Rowther Films' first release in the 21st century was Puriyadha Anandam Puthithaga Arambam (2015) featuring Krish and Srushti Dange in the lead role. Rowther had selected Krish for the role in late 2012, but the film eventually went through a production delay and did not perform well at the box office.

== Personal life ==
Ibrahim had a close relationship with his childhood friend, actor Vijayakanth. As his trusted confidante in the industry, Ibrahim was entrusted with the job of picking out the right scripts and producing films for the actor. However, the pair later fell out in 2012, with Rowther departing from Vijayakanth's political party to the All India Anna Dravida Munnetra Kazhagam citing that Vijayakanth lacked decorum.

== Death ==
Vijayakanth often visited Rowther in hospital a week before his death and wrote an open letter about their friendship. Ibrahim Rowther died aged 63, following a prolonged illness on 22 July 2015.

== Filmography ==
=== As producer ===
Rowther Films

Title	Year	Director	Cast	Notes
Uzhavan Magan	1987	R. Aravindraj	Vijayakanth, Radhika, Radha	
Thalattu Padava	1990	R. Sundarrajan	Parthiban, Rupini, Khushbu	
Bharathan	1992	Sabapathy Dekshinamurthy	Vijayakanth, Bhanupriya, Napoleon	
Thai Mozhi	1992	R. R. Ilavarasan	Sarathkumar, Vijayakanth, Mohini	
Rajadurai	1993	S. A. Chandrasekhar	Vijayakanth, Jayasudha, Sivaranjani	
Karuppu Nila	1995	R. Aravindraj	Vijayakanth, Ranjitha, Khushbu	
Aavathum Pennale Azhivathum Pennale	1996	Senthilnathan	Arun Pandian, Mansoor Ali Khan, Rajashree	
Dharma	1998	Keyaar	Vijayakanth, Preetha Vijayakumar, Shilpa	
Puriyadha Anandam Puthithaga Arambam	2015	Syed Ibrahim	Krish, Srushti Dange	
Ellaam Mela Irukuravan Paathuppan	2023	U. Kaviraj	Aari Arujunan, Shaashvi Bala	

Tamilannai Cine Creation

Title	Year	Director	Cast	Notes
Poonthotta Kaavalkaaran	1988	Senthilnathan	Vijayakanth, Radhika, Anand	
Paattukku Oru Thalaivan	1989	Liaquat Ali Khan	Vijayakanth, Shobana	
En Aasai Machan	1994	R. Sundarrajan	Vijayakanth, Murali, Revathi	
Gandhi Pirantha Mann	1995	R. Sundarrajan	Vijayakanth, Revathi, Ravali	
Aavathum Pennale Azhivathum Pennale	1996	Senthilnathan	Arun Pandiyan	
Dhinamum Ennai Gavani	1997	A. R. Ramesh	Ramki, Sanghavi, Prakash Raj	
Simmasanam	2000	Eshwaran	Vijayakanth, Khushbu, Manthra	

I. V. Cine Productions

Title	Year	Director	Cast	Notes
Pulan Visaranai	1990	R. K. Selvamani	Vijayakanth, Rupini, Radharavi	
Captain Prabhakaran	1991	R. K. Selvamani	Vijayakanth, Rupini, Sarathkumar	
Sakkarai Devan	1993	J. Panneer	Vijayakanth, Sukanya, Kanaka	
Ulavuthurai	1998	Ramesh Selvan	Vijayakanth, Meena,	
Pulan Visaranai 2	2015	R. K. Selvamani	Prashanth, Karthika, Parul Yadav	
