= M. Sundaram =

Indian politician

M. Sundaram Mudaliar is an Indian politician and former Member of the Legislative Assembly of Tamil Nadu. He was twice elected to the Tamil Nadu legislative assembly from Rishivandiyam constituency, as an Indian National Congress candidate in the 1977 election, and as an Indian National Congress (Indira) candidate in the 1980 election. He also served as Chairman of Thirukovilur for many years. S. Sivaraj was nephew of him. He belongs to Sengunthar Kaikola Mudaliyar community.
