= P. C. Ramakrishna =

Indian theatre and voice actor

- Education: Loyola College, Chennai
- Occupations: Voice artist, theatre actor
- Years active: 1993–1998

P. C. Ramakrishna is a veteran theatre actor and voice artist based in Chennai, India. He has acted in several plays, such as Anna Weiss, Dance Like A Man, The Good Doctor and provided voice-overs to numerous advertisements, documentaries and corporate shows. He has been a member of the English theatre group The Madras Players since 1969.

== Biography ==
Ramakrishna did his schooling in Kolkata, India, and completed his undergraduate education at the Loyola College, Chennai. Ramakrishna's early interests included learning the mridangam – an ancient Indian percussion instrument – and he trained under Palghat Mani Iyer in Chennai and Tanjavur. He played mridangam for 18 years since the age of 3 and was considering making it a profession, but was discouraged by low wages for musicians. Instead, he joined the Indian Institute of Management, Ahmedabad, and after graduation worked in the corporate sector from 1967 until voluntary retirement in 1993.

== Career ==
Most of the documentary narration work that I do is dull as ditch water. For example, tell me how many people are interested in the details of installing a boiler?

— P. C. Ramakrishna, interview to JobsByRef

Ramakrishna worked on his first play as a director in 1969, which was also the only play he directed. Subsequently, he auditioned for the play The Crucible by The Madras Players, a role which he eventually got. While working in the industry, he hosted programs on the All India Radio, and was later approached by the Doordarshan. Ramakrishna was one of the first English news readers in Indian television.

Ramakrishna's notable plays include Anna Weiss, where he plays the role of a man who is accused of sexual abuse by his daughter; Mercy, a monologue based on a novel by the Tamil author Sivasankari; and Mahesh Dattani's Dance Like A Man.

== Filmography ==
Year	Film	Role
1993	Thiruda Thiruda	Finance Minister
1994	May Madham	Sandhya's father
1995	Karuppu Nila	ShanmugaPandian's Father
1997	Poochudava	Nandhini's Father
1998	Ulavuthurai	Navy Chief
