= Karuppu Nila =

- Poster
- Directed by: R. Aravindraj
- Screenplay by: P. Kalaimani
- Story by: A. S. Ibrahim Rowther
- Produced by: A. S. Ibrahim Rowther
- Starring: Vijayakanth; Ranjitha; Khushbu
- Cinematography: Rajarajan
- Edited by: G. Jayachandran
- Music by: Deva
- Production company: Rowther Films
- Distributed by: GV Films
- Release date: 16 January 1995
- Running time: 155 minutes
- Country: India
- Language: Tamil

Karuppu Nila (transl. Black Moon) is a 1995 Tamil-language action film directed R. Aravindraj and produced by A. S. Ibrahim Rowther. The film stars Vijayakanth, Ranjitha and Khushbu, with M. N. Nambiar, Kazan Khan, R. Sundarrajan, Major Sundarrajan, S. S. Chandran, Srividya and P. C. Ramakrishna playing supporting roles. It was released on 16 January 1995, and turned out to be a hit at the box office.

== Plot ==
Shanmuga Pandian is a kind-hearted person who lives with his father Selvanayagam, mother Lakshmi, and sister Sumathi. Selvanayagam is a respected estate owner. Later, Shanmuga Pandian and Divya fall in love with each other.

At Sumathi's wedding, Selvanayagam is falsely arrested for supplying weapons to terrorists. If it turns out to be true, all his savings will be donated to the coffers of the State. Thereafter, Sumathi's wedding is stopped, Lakshmi becomes paralysed, and Divya refuses to marry him only because Shanmuga Pandian became poor.

Afterwards, Nandhini hires Shanmuga Pandian in her company, but Nandhini's father considers Selvanayagam as his nemesis. Shanmuga Pandian and Nandhini fall in love with each other.

The conspiracy against Selvanayagam was in fact planned by the corrupt politician P.K.R and his son Vasu. Later, Divya marries Vasu, but the sadistic Vasu tortures Divya. The rest of the story concerns Shanmuga Pandian proving his father's innocence and exacting revenge on the villains with the help of Divya and Nandhini. In this process, Divya dies, and Shanmuga Pandian eventually marries Nandhini.

== Cast ==
- Vijayakanth as Shanmuga Pandian
- Ranjitha as Divya
- Khushbu as Nandhini
- M. N. Nambiar as Nandhini's father
- R. Sundarrajan as Sundaram
- S. S. Chandran as P.K.R
- Srividya as Lakshmi, Shanmuga Pandian's mother
- P. C. Ramakrishna as Selvanayagam, as Shanmuga Pandian's father
- Meena Kumari as Sumathi, Shanmuga Pandian's sister
- Kazan Khan as Vasu
- Kullamani as Kulla
- Major Sundarrajan
- Loose Mohan
- Swaminathan
- Reena
- Peeli Sivam
- Kallapart Natarajan
- Pasi Narayanan
- Vellai Subbaiah
- Karuppu Subbiah
- Premi
- Vaijayanti
- Raviraj
- Mannangatti Subramaniam

== Production ==
The helicopter fight scene was shot at Goa.

== Soundtrack ==
The music was composed by Deva.

Song	Singer(s)	Lyricist	Duration
"Chinnavare Chinnavare"	S. P. Balasubrahmanyam, S. Janaki	Piraisoodan	4:35
"Coffee Venuma Tea Venuma"	S. P. Balasubrahmanyam, K. S. Chithra	Vaali	5:11
"Namma Ooru Thottathile"	Krishnaraj, K. S. Chithra, Mano	Vaali	5:10
"Sunda Kanji Soru"	Malaysia Vasudevan, K. S. Chithra	Vaali	5:08
"Pallakku Pallakku"	Swarnalatha	Piraisoodan	4:18

== Critical reception ==
R. P. R. of Kalki noted that despite having able technicians, the film makes audience squirm from beginning to the end citing various reasons such as too many emotional scenes for an action film, apart from gun, car, motor boat, helicopter chasing and hastily added things like Premananda issue, court scenes and lengthy dialogues. He however said that Vijayakanth, despite having visibly aged, was able to perform his fight scenes well.
