= Poonthotta Kaavalkaaran =

- Poster
- Directed by: Senthilnathan
- Screenplay by: Liaquat Ali Khan
- Story by: A. S. Ibrahim Rowther
- Produced by: T. Siva; R. Sundar Raj; I. Rahumathulla; Tamil Fathima
- Starring: Vijayakanth; Radhika; Anand; Vani Viswanath; Livingston
- Cinematography: Rajarajan
- Edited by: G. Jayachandran
- Music by: Ilaiyaraaja
- Production company: Tamilannai Cine Creation
- Release date: 10 June 1988
- Running time: 139 minutes
- Country: India
- Language: Tamil

Poonthotta Kaavalkaaran (transl. The guard of the flower garden) is a 1988 Indian Tamil-language action drama film directed by Senthilnathan, in his directorial debut. The film stars Vijayakanth, Radhika, Anand, Vani Viswanath and Livingston. It was released on 10 June 1988, and ran for over 175 days in theatres. The film was remade in Telugu as Dharma Teja (1988).

== Plot ==
Anthony, a powerful goon with a heart of gold, is being pursued by the newly appointed DSP, who's determined to put an end to Anthony's illicit liquor trade. Anthony consistently evades the police, once cleverly escaping during Muthu Badsha's wedding, where he's a revered figure.

Meanwhile, an eloping couple, Anand and Vidhya, accidentally stow away in Anthony's lorry. As Anthony confronts them, they reveal their story. Vidhya is Ramkumar's sister, a wealthy smuggler with significant political influence. Anand and Vidhya were schoolmates, and after a few encounters, Anand playfully ragged Vidhya, prompting Ramkumar to capture and torture him. However, Vidhya developed feelings for Anand, and he eventually reciprocated. When an MLA, acquainted with Ramkumar, spotted the couple, he informed Ramkumar, who ordered the MLA to eliminate Anand and his grandmother. Vidhya overheard the conversation, and before Anand could intervene, Ramkumar's henchmen attacked his grandmother, who succumbed to her injuries. On her deathbed, she urged Anand and Vidhya to escape Ooty before Ramkumar could harm them. With the help of Anand's friends, they fled to Madras.

After hearing their story, Anthony sympathizes with Anand and Vidhya, especially since Anthony is also an orphan. However, Anthony's rival gang attacks him, causing Anand and Vidhya to get separated from him. Coincidentally, they end up at Anthony's house, where he and his wife Sivagami take care of them. Meanwhile, the MLA manipulates Ramkumar into believing that his wife Susheela, helped Vidhya escape, leading Ramkumar to torture Susheela for information about Vidhya's whereabouts. During their stay with Anthony, Anand and Vidhya ask him why he engages in illicit businesses despite being a good person. Anthony reveals his past: he was abandoned as a baby at a church gate and raised by a cemetery worker. After his death, Anthony became an orphan and was forced to do menial jobs to survive. He was imprisoned for unknowingly carrying illicit liquor and spent most of his youth in prison without guidance.

Anthony eventually joined the illicit liquor trade and later worked under an MLA. He fell in love with the MLA's daughter Sivagami, and despite her father's resistance, they got married. One of MLA's friends, a DSP, helped Anthony get a job after Sivagami's request. Sivagami soon becomes pregnant, but her life takes a tragic turn when her father sends goons to kill Anthony. In a desperate attempt to protect her husband, Sivagami intervenes and suffers a brutal attack, resulting in a miscarriage that leaves her unable to bear children. Haunted by his past as a criminal, Anthony struggles to find peace after trying to reform. He eventually returns to his old ways, manufacturing illicit liquor and engaging in rowdyism. However, he's now more powerful and feared.

Anthony and Sivagami treat Anand and Vidhya like their own children. To get them married, Sivagami requests Anthony to persuade Ramkumar to accept the union. Anthony and Muthu Badsha visit Ramkumar, who feigns acceptance. Trusting Ramkumar's words, Anthony brings them to Ramkumar's house, where wedding preparations are underway. However, Anthony soon realizes that Ramkumar is lying, and so he rescues Vidhya and challenges Ramkumar that Vidhya's marriage will be conducted with his acceptance. Ramkumar enlists the help of the DSP to persuade Vidhya to return home with him. However, the DSP has a past connection with Anthony, having helped him secure a job. When the DSP confronts Anthony, he refuses, citing her desire to stay with them and marry Anand. The DSP has a change of heart and advises Ramkumar to respect Vidhya's wishes. But Ramkumar uses his influence to mobilize a large police force to arrest Anthony and his team, prompting Anthony to fight back with guns and bombs.

Meanwhile, Ramkumar's goons abduct Vidhya and Muthu Badsha's wife. Muthu Badsha intervenes, but Ramkumar stabs and kills him. Anthony learns that Ramkumar is forcing Vidhya into another marriage and rushes to intervene. After a fierce battle, despite being stabbed, Anthony holds Ramkumar at gunpoint and demands that he allow Anand to marry Vidhya. Ramkumar's men try to block Anand's path, but Anthony's men escort him and Sivagami to the wedding venue. As Anand prepares to tie the knot with Vidhya, Anthony, mortally wounded, addresses the gathering. He reflects on the cost of uniting the couple, including the loss of his loyal aide Muthu Badsha, and asks the attendees to genuinely bless the couple if they believe Ramkumar's actions were unjust. The corrupt MLA, who had been supporting Ramkumar, has a change of heart. Moments after Anand completes the wedding ceremony, Anthony succumbs to his injuries and dies, leaving Sivakami and even Ramkumar in shock.

== Cast ==
- Vijayakanth as Anthony
- Radhika as Sivagami
- Anand as Anand
- Vani Viswanath as Vidhya
- Livingston as Ramkumar
- S. S. Chandran as M.L.A.
- M. N. Nambiar as D.S.P.
- Thyagu as Ramkumar's manager
- Vijay Krishnaraj as a corrupt minister
- Kokila as Susheela, Ramkumar's wife
- S. N. Lakshmi as Anand's grandmother
- K. S. Jayalakshmi
- Takla Ramu as MLA's assistant
- Kullamani
- Pandiyan in a guest appearance as Muthu Badsha
- Senthil in a guest appearance as Azhagu
- Malaysia Vasudevan in a special appearance as Sivagami's father

== Production ==
Senthilnathan, son of Jambulingam who directed Nam Naadu with M. G. Ramachandran and erstwhile assistant of S. A. Chandrasekhar and V. Azhagappan made his directorial debut with this film. Vijayakanth offered Livingston a negative role in the film, and he accepted. The filming was held at Mudumalai forests.

== Soundtrack ==
The music was composed by Ilaiyaraaja, with lyrics by Gangai Amaran. The song "Sindhiya Venmani" song is set to the Carnatic raga Srothaswini, and "Paramal Partha Nenjam" is set to Suddha Dhanyasi.

| Song | Singers | Length | Lyricist |
|---|---|---|---|
| "En Uyire Vaa" | S. P. Balasubrahmanyam, K. S. Chithra | 04:31 | Gangai Amaran |
| "Adi Kaana Karunkuyile" | K. J. Yesudas | 05:35 | Gangai Amaran |
| "Kavalkara Kavalkara" | Ilaiyaraaja | 04:07 | Gangai Amaran |
| "Paadatha Themmangu" | S. P. Balasubrahmanyam | 05:32 | Gangai Amaran |
| "Paramal Paartha Nenjam" | Mano, K. S. Chithra | 04:26 | Gangai Amaran |
| "Sindhiya Venmani" | K. J. Yesudas, P. Susheela | 04:22 | Gangai Amaran |
| "Ezhaigal Vaazha Nee" | Ilaiyaraaja | 01:02 | Gangai Amaran |

== Critical reception ==
Jayamanmadhan (a duo) of Kalki praised Livingston's performance but felt his character design as antagonist was not strong enough while also praising Chandran's humour and Ilaiyaraaja's music but panned the flashback of Vani and Anand as lengthy and dragged. They also felt the inclusion of stunt sequences in an emotional film was like neither here and nor there.

== Accolades ==
Radhika won the Cinema Express Award for Best Actress – Tamil, and Livingston won for Best New Face.

== Bibliography ==
- Sundararaman (2007) [2005]. Raga Chintamani: A Guide to Carnatic Ragas Through Tamil Film Music (2nd ed.). Pichhamal Chintamani. OCLC 295034757.
