= The Madras Players =

English-language theatre group in Chennai, India

The Madras Players are the oldest English-language theatre group in Chennai, the capital of Tamil Nadu, India. The Madras Players have staged over 240 theatre productions for more than 50 years.

== History ==
The Madras Players has its origins from Kilpauk General/Mental Hospital in the Psychiatric Ward, a theatre group exclusively for the mentally disabled, that mounted comedies and bedroom farces in the early 1950s. In 1955, the British Council first hosted Robert Newton's Othello which featured a mix of British and Indian actors. Shortly after, the Madras Dramatic Society closed down, and bequeathed most of their props and make-up equipment to The Madras Players founding members N. S. Yamuna and Gayathri (Grace) Krishnaswamy.

The group members in the early 1960s included Thambi Kadambavanam, Ammu Mathew, Girish Karnad, and Stewart Melluish. In their early days, the group staged British works from Terence Rattigan, Shakespeare, Ibsen, Osborne with the help of directors like John Shepherd and Peter Coe and with constant support from the British Council. In the 1970s, they turned their attention to the newly available English translations of Indian-language plays, a venture which was well received by the audiences. Noted Kannada director Girish Karnad translated his plays to English for the group, who also performed translated works of playwrights like Mohan Rakesh, Vijay Tendulkar and Gurucharan Das.

Noted performers for the Players in this period include comedian Naushir Ratnagar, back-stage artist Mithran Devanesan and voice-artist P. C. Ramakrishna, who has been a member of the group since 1969.

== Activities ==
The Players' notable theatre productions include adaptations of Vijay Tendulkar's Kanyadaan, Shreekumar Varma's Midnight Hotel and Girish Karnad's Hayavadana. The group's longest running play was the 2007 adaptation of Chetan Bhagat's novel Five Point Someone.
