= Kattalai (film) =

- Film poster
- Directed by: Liaquat Ali Khan
- Written by: Liaquat Ali Khan
- Produced by: M. Gopi
- Starring: Sathyaraj; Bhanupriya
- Cinematography: Rajarajan
- Edited by: G. Jayachandran
- Music by: Ilaiyaraaja
- Production company: Sri Thirumala Art Productions
- Release date: 15 May 1993
- Country: India
- Language: Tamil

Kattalai (transl. Order/Command) is a 1993 Indian Tamil-language action film written and directed by Liaquat Ali Khan. The film stars Sathyaraj and Bhanupriya. It was released on 15 May 1993.

== Plot ==
Sabarathnam is the son of Natarajan, who has no job and spends his time reading newspapers. Sabarathnam is the sole breadwinner of his family. He tries to bring down all the atrocities happening in the society then he falls in love with Vijaya.

== Cast ==
- Sathyaraj as Sabarathnam
- Bhanupriya as Vijaya
- Anandaraj as Rangarajan
- R. Sundarrajan as Natarajan
- Radha Ravi as Venkadachalam
- Ravi as Sabarathnam Friend
- S. S. Chandran as Venkadachalam PA
- Srividya as Venkadachalam wife
- Sumithra as Natarajan Wife
- Anju as Anjali Sabarathnam Sister
- Kavitha as Venkadachalam 2nd wife

== Soundtrack ==
The soundtrack was composed by Ilaiyaraaja and lyrics were written by Vaali. In an interview, Liaquat Ali Khan said initially A. R. Rahman was booked as the composer; due to producer's concern he was replaced by Ilaiyaraaja.

Song	Singers	Length
"Aathukara Mama"	Mano, K. S. Chithra	05:04
"En Aasai"	Malaysia Vasudevan, K. S. Chithra	04:57
"Naa Vanna Nila"	K. S. Chithra	04:01
"Nambinen Maharajane"	Sunandha, Mano	04:58
"Thai Piranthathu"	Mano	05:37

== Reception ==
Malini Mannath of The Indian Express called it a "crude remake" of the director's previous film Ezhai Jaathi. K. Vijiyan of New Straits Times wrote, "Kattalai will go down well with Sathyaraj fans but for those who are not particularly thrilled by his presence, you may find it difficult to shake off that deja vu feeling that you have seen all these before".
