= Oor Mariyadhai =

- Theatrical release poster
- Directed by: K. S. Ravikumar
- Screenplay by: K. S. Ravikumar
- Story by: R. N. Kumaresan
- Produced by: R. B. Choudary
- Starring: Sarathkumar; Sasikala; Napoleon; Anand
- Cinematography: Ashok Rajan
- Edited by: K. Thanikachalam
- Music by: Deva
- Production company: Super Good Films
- Release date: 1 May 1992
- Running time: 148 minutes
- Country: India
- Language: Tamil

Oor Mariyadhai (transl. Respect of the village) is a 1992 Indian Tamil-language drama film directed by K. S. Ravikumar. The film stars Sarathkumar, Sasikala, Napoleon and Anand. It revolves around Rathnavelu (Sarathkumar), who is in love with Rasathi (Sasikala) who, however, loves Kannan (Anand). When her mother discovers this fact she gets her forcefully married to Rathnavelu leading to Kannan committing suicide and his brother swearing revenge. The film, produced by R. B. Choudary, was released on 1 May 1992.

== Plot ==
In a village, the annual temple festival features a dangerous tug-of-war contest held across a fire pit. The victor earns the highest honor—carrying the deity's sacred sword, who becomes the village's moral authority, empowered to settle disputes and issue judgments.

Rathnavelu "Rathnam" Thevar, a widely respected nobleman, wins the contest by defeating the womanizer Veerapandi "Veerapandi" Thevar, whom the villagers dislike. Rathnam loves his niece Rasathi, though she sees him only with familial affection. Rathnam's cousin Kamachi harbors a one-sided love for him that he never reciprocates. His devotion to Rasathi is so deep that he tattoos her name on his arm. One day, during a playful quarrel about beauty between Kamachi and Rasathi, Rasathi impulsively accepts a challenge and remains bathing unclothed in the river in anger. At that moment, Kannan—Veerapandi's younger brother returns to the village after completing his studies. Due to the chaos caused by Minor Mahadevan and his aide, the coracle overturns, and he falls into the river, where he unexpectedly encounters Rasathi. Struck by her beauty, he falls in love instantly. Rasathi soon reciprocates his feelings, and they begin a secret romance.

As the sword-bearer, Rathnam presides over village justice. When Rakappan falsely accuses his wife of infidelity—though he is actually abusive—Rathnam orders their separation, earning respect for protecting the woman. Trouble begins when Rasathi's family discovers her love for Kannan, who belongs to their sworn enemy's lineage. Rasathi's grandmother Chinna Thaayi recounts the violent past: years earlier, Rasathi's father Chinnaraj defeated Veerapandi and Kannan's father Muthupandi Thevar in the same sacred contest. Humiliated, Muthupandi attacked him, and both men died in the clash. During the violence, Rathnam's father, Arumuga Thevar, lost a leg. Since then, hatred between the families has endured.

Seeking revenge, Veerapandi manipulates Kannan into eloping with Rasathi. When she refuses, he abducts her. Rathnam intervenes and rescues her, but to prevent Rasathi from entering the rival family, her mother compels Rathnam to marry her. Bound by duty, Rathnam agrees. The next day, Kannan is found dead by suicide in the village square. Devastated, Rasathi attempts to kill herself but is stopped. Rathnam, understanding her grief, pretends to be drunk on their wedding night so the marriage will not be consummated, respecting her love for another man. Veerapandi, blaming Rathnam's family for his brother's death, plots revenge. His attempt to kill Rathnam through an electrical trap fails, killing a cow instead. Rathnam learns of the plot but is restrained by his father, who urges him not to act in anger.

During a feast arranged by Minor, Rasathi behaves affectionately toward Rathnam in public for the sake of family honor. Rathnam mistakenly believes she has begun to accept him, but she later clarifies that she still loves Kannan. Heartbroken, Rathnam turns to alcohol for the first time. In a drunken state, he approaches Rasathi, intending to consummate the marriage, but she panics and resists, causing a public scene. Rakappan seizes this opportunity to convene a panchayat, citing Rathnam's earlier judgment about protecting women from abusive husbands. Veerapandi humiliates Rathnam by spreading false accusations about Kamachi's character, forcing her to leave in shame. The council rules that Rathnam and Rasathi must separate after Rasathi openly declares she cannot accept him as her husband. She removes and returns the thali he tied. To protect Rathnam's reputation, Kamachi marries another man.

At the next festival, despite his family's pleas, Rathnam participates in the fire-pit tug-of-war for the village's sake. The rope reminds him of the thali and his broken marriage; emotionally shattered, he loses and falls into the flames, suffering severe injuries. Veerapandi becomes the new sword-bearer and gains power. Rasathi, realizing her role in Rathnam's suffering, laments that she agreed to the separation only so he could live happily with someone else, never knowing his love for her was absolute. Now in authority, Veerapandi attempts to force Rasathi into marriage. When her mother intervenes, he tries to assault her. The villagers inform Rathnam, who—despite his injuries—rises to protect them. Fighting through Veerapandi's men, Rathnam reaches the temple grounds, takes up the sacred sword, and kills Veerapandi.

Grievously wounded, Rathnam collapses. Rasathi discovers the tattoo of her name on his arm and the thali he had preserved as a memory of their bond. Only then does she fully understand the depth of his love. Overcome with guilt and sorrow, she begs forgiveness beside his lifeless body—and dies beside him with the thali chain entwined around her neck as though their marriage still lives. The film ends with the families mourning the tragic couple.

== Cast ==
- Sarathkumar as Rathnavelu "Rathnam" Thevar
- Sasikala as Rasathi
- Srividya as Rasathi's mother and Rathnavelu's sister
- Goundamani as Minor "Minor" Mahadevan
- Senthil as Chinna Minor
- Napoleon as Veerapandi Thevar
- Anand as Kannan
- Sindhu as Kamachi
- V. Gopalakrishnan as Arumuga Thevar
- Delhi Ganesh as Veerapandi's uncle
- Kumarimuthu as Minor's tenant
- Gandhimathi as Chinna Thaayi
- K. S. Jayalakshmi as Minor's wife
- Typist Gopu as a village headman
- Bayilvan Ranganathan as Thalaivetti Muniyandi (uncredited role)
- Vijayakumar in a special appearance as Sakkarapatti Chinnaraj
- Kitty in a special appearance as Muthupandi Thevar
- R. N. Kumaresan in a special appearance
- K. S. Ravikumar in a special appearance as Rakappan

== Soundtrack ==
The music was composed by Deva, with lyrics by Kalidasan. The song "Unna Naan Thottathukku" was originally composed for the film Adhikaalai Subavelai which never released.

Track listing
No.	Title	Singer(s)	Length
1.	"Ethirveetu Jannal"	Malaysia Vasudevan, Krishnaraj	5:24
2.	"Kichchali Samba"	S. P. Balasubrahmanyam, K. S. Chithra	5:03
3.	"Malaruthu"	K. S. Chithra, S. A. Rajkumar	4:56
4.	"Mariyadai Ullavan"	K. S. Chithra	5:05
5.	"Palapalanguthu Thalathalanguthu"	Swarnalatha, S. P. Sailaja	5:08
6.	"Unna Naan Thottathukku"	S. P. Balasubrahmanyam	4:30
Total length:			30:06

== Release and reception ==
Oor Mariyadhai was released on 1 May 1992. C. R. K. of Kalki wrote even though name of the characters, locations, making, actors, screenplay will get changed, the story will remain the same.
