= Chirabandhavya =

- Poster
- Directed by: M. S. Rajashekar
- Written by: Saisuthe (Based on a novel of same name)
- Produced by: R. Niveditha; N. Prema; K. Doreswamy
- Starring: Shiva Rajkumar; Subhashri; Chi Guru Dutt
- Cinematography: Mallikarjun
- Edited by: T. Shashikumar
- Music by: Hamsalekha
- Production company: Shashwathi Chitra
- Release date: 1 July 1993
- Running time: 134 minutes
- Country: India
- Language: Kannada

Chirabandhavya is a 1993 Indian Kannada-language romance drama film directed by M. S. Rajashekar and produced by Shashwathi Chitra. The film stars Shiva Rajkumar, Subhashri and Bharathi. The film's plot is based on the novel of the same name, written by Sai Suthe. The movie, which was Shiva Rajkumar's 17th movie in a lead role, was his first movie to not complete 50 days.

== Cast ==
- Shiva Rajkumar
- Subhashri
- Bharathi (Sukanya)
- Chi Guru Dutt
- K. S. Ashwath
- Thoogudeepa Srinivas
- Pandari Bai
- Mynavathi
- Girija Lokesh
- Ashwath Narayan
- Pramila Joshai
- Avinash

== Soundtrack ==
The soundtrack of the film was composed by Hamsalekha.

Track listing
No.	Title	Lyrics	Singer(s)	Length
1.	"Cheluva Cheluva"	Hamsalekha	S. P. Balasubrahmanyam, Manjula Gururaj
2.	"Thaatha Thaatha"	Hamsalekha	Shivarajkumar
3.	"Raam Raam"	Hamsalekha	S. P. Balasubrahmanyam
4.	"Koli Kalla"	Hamsalekha	S. P. Balasubrahmanyam
5.	"Baaligu Bhoomigu"	Hamsalekha	Rajkumar
