= Akka! Bagunnava? =

- Poster
- Directed by: Mouli
- Written by: Mouli
- Produced by: TVD Prasad
- Starring: Jayasudha; Anand; Vikram; Ravali; Subhashri
- Cinematography: A. Vijayakumar
- Edited by: Rama Rao
- Music by: Koti
- Production company: National Art Movies
- Release date: 31 May 1996
- Running time: 135 minutes
- Country: India
- Language: Telugu

Akka! Bagunnava? (transl. Sister! Are you fine?) is a 1996 Indian Telugu-language drama film written and directed by Mouli. The film stars Vikram, Jayasudha and Anand in the leading roles, while Ravali and Subhashri play supporting roles.

== Cast ==
- Jayasudha as Lakshmi
- Anand as Mohan
- Vikram as Pedababu
- Ravali
- Subhashri
- Devan
- Brahmanandam
- Tanikella Bharani
- Narra Venkateswara Rao as Geetha's father
- C. V. L. Narasimha Rao
- Gundu Hanumantha Rao
- Gautam Raju
- M. S. Narayana
- Raghava Lawrence in a special appearance

== Production ==
The film progressed smoothly and was completed without a climax portion shot. Producer Prasad later approached then budding writer Trivikram Srinivas to help propose a climax, which was later completed by Posani Krishna Murali and used in the film.

== Soundtrack ==
Akka! Bagunnava?

Soundtrack album by Koti
- Genre: Feature film soundtrack
- Language: Telugu
- Producer: Koti

The soundtrack album was composed by Koti.

Tracklist

No.	Title	Singer(s)	Length
1.	"Aalesha Deko"	Suresh Peters	5:08
2.	"Sarada Sada"	Murali, Swarnalatha	4:52
3.	"Aa Pakka Chandamama"	S. P. Balasubrahmanyam, K. S. Chithra
4.	"Antannidurra Poye Velaendi"	K. S. Chithra	4:24
5.	"Abbo Pillagade"	Murali	4:56
Total length:			23:34

== Release ==
The film was later dubbed and released in Tamil under the title Aarusamy by Supriya Arts, as a result of Vikram's new found saleability after the release of Sethu (1999).
