= Vasantham Karthikeyan =

Indian politician

K. Karthikeyan
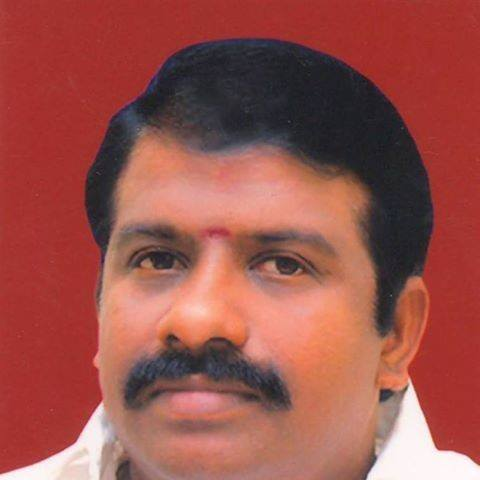

Member of the Tamil Nadu Legislative Assembly
- Incumbent
- Assumed office 16 May 2016
- Preceded by: S. A. Santhosh
- Succeeded by: Vijayakanth
- Constituency: Rishivandiyam

Personal details
- Party: Dravida Munnetra Kazhagam

Vasantham Kannan Karthikeyan is a politician in the Kallakurichi district in the Indian state of Tamil Nadu. He was selected as a member of legislative assembly from Rishivanthiyam in 2016 and 2021, representing the D.M.K Party.

== Early life ==
Karthikeyan was born at Saathanur Village in 1978. Karthikeyan's parents were Kannan and Gandimathi.

== Elections contested ==
Election	Constituency	Party	Result	Vote %	Runner-up	Runner-up Party	Runner-up vote %
2021 Tamil Nadu Legislative Assembly election	Rishivandiyam	DMK	Won	51.27%	S. A. Santhosh	ADMK	39.81%
2016 Tamil Nadu Legislative Assembly election	Rishivandiyam	DMK	Won	49.16%	K. Dhandapani	ADMK	31.77%
