= Aavathum Pennale Azhivathum Pennale =

- Directed by: Senthilnathan
- Screenplay by: Senthilnathan
- Story by: Ibrahim Rowther
- Produced by: Tamil Fathima
- Starring: C. Arunpandian; Mansoor Ali Khan; Jayabharathi
- Cinematography: Rajarajan
- Edited by: G. Jeyachandran
- Music by: Bala Bharathi
- Production company: Tamilannai Cine Creation
- Release date: 17 May 1996
- Running time: 130 minutes
- Country: India
- Language: Tamil

Aavathum Pennale Azhivathum Pennale (transl. Women are the reason for rise and demise) is a 1996 Indian Tamil-language crime film directed by Senthilnathan. The film stars C. Arunpandian, Mansoor Ali Khan and Jayabharathi. It was released on 17 May 1996.

== Plot ==
The film begins with the murder of a reputed heart surgeon Dr. Charles. The next day, Sivalingam is killed by a mysterious person. His wife, Chandra, is a corrupt and influential politician who supplies weapons to the terrorists. The mysterious person warns Chandra that he will continue to kill them. Antony, an honest police officer, is charged to protect Chandra. Soon, Antony finds out that the killer was none other than Chandra's son-in-law and his best friend Prabhakaran.

In a flashback, Prabhakaran fell in love with and married Chandra's daughter Lakshmi. He lived happily with his mother, his wife Lakshmi and his son in Chandra's house. One day, his mother witnessed the murder of a CBI officer by Chandra, and Chandra poisoned her.

Antony and Prabhakaran decide to team up to punish the heartless Chandra.

== Cast ==
- C. Arunpandian as DCP Antony IPS
- Mansoor Ali Khan as Prabhakaran
- Jayabharathi as Chandra
- M. N. Nambiar as Deena Dayalan
- Manivannan as Sivalingam
- Rajashree as Lakshmi
- C. R. Vijayakumari as Prabhakaran's mother
- T. N. S. Ashokakumar
- Jinna
- Bobby as Chandra's brother
- Vivek as Dhanush
- Balu Anand as Manush
- Vijay Krishnaraj as Dr. Charles
- Peeli Sivam as Police inspector
- Raviraj as the Police inspector
- Periyar Dasan as Amavasai, Prabhakaran's father
- Chitti as CBI officer
- Idichapuli Selvaraj as Astrologer
- Kullamani as the Police inspector
- Kovai Senthil as Kuppusamy
- Vaithi as Azhagunambi
- Nellai Siva as Sandana Karuppan
- Kavithasri as Inspector Satyavadi
- J. Lalitha as Lakshmi
- Premi as Dr. Charles' wife
- Sri Bharathi
- LIC Narasimhan as Dr. Maari
- Bayilvan Ranganathan
- Silk Smitha in a special appearance

== Soundtrack ==
The music was composed by Bala Bharathi, with lyrics written by Piraisoodan.

Song	Singer(s)	Duration
"Chinna Chitti"	S. P. Balasubrahmanyam	5:03
"Mavane Magarasanae"	K. S. Chithra	5:02
"Mavane Magarasanae"	Anuradha Sriram	5:14
"Nillu Nillu"	Swarnalatha	5:04
"Uyire Uyir Dheepame"	Mano	5:01
"Uyire Uyir Dheepame"	Bala Bharathi	5:21

== Critical reception ==
Tharamani of Kalki praised the film for mocking contemporary politics and also praising the performances of Jayabharathi and Mansoor Ali Khan but panned cinematic flashback, duet, unrealistic climax which could have been avoided. The Hindu wrote, "Ibrahim Rowther's story has events that resemble the happenings in Tamil Nadu and the viewer can easily identify the female personality who has a strong hold over the ruling leader. K. C. Thangam's caustic dialogue, punched out in a couple of places, adds to the performances of Jayabharathi, the lady with lethal connections, and Mansur Ali Khan, her son-in-law who falling a victim to her power hungry schemes takes up cudgels against her".
