= Puriyadha Anandam Puthithaga Arambam =

2015 Indian film by Syed Ibrahim

- Directed by: Syed Ibrahim
- Produced by: Ibrahim Rowther
- Starring: Krish; Srushti Dange
- Music by: A. R. Reihana
- Production company: Rowther Films
- Release date: 5 June 2015
- Country: India
- Language: Tamil

Puriyadha Anandam Puthithaga Arambam (lit. 'An ununderstandable happiness, a new beginning') is a 2015 Tamil romantic drama film written and directed by Syed Ibrahim, which stars Krish and Srushti Dange. The title of the film is derived from the song in Mouna Ragam composed by Ilaiyaraaja. The film was released on 5 June 2015.

== Cast ==
- Krish as Bharathi
- Srushti Dange as Amudha
- Vijay Babu as Bharathi's father
- Pooja Ramachandran as Amudha's friend
- Nitish Veera as Mano
- Kayal Devaraj

== Production ==
Puriyadha Anandam Puthithaga Arambam is named after a line from the Mouna Ragam song "Chinna Chinna Vanna Kuyil". Producer Ibrahim Rowther spotted Krish in the "Aga Naga" song in Ko (2011) and offered him the chance of portraying the lead role in his production, Puriyatha Anantham Puthithaga Aarambam. The film, a romantic love story featuring him alongside Srushti Dange, began shoot in late 2012 but was only released in June 2015.

== Critical reception ==
The film received negative reviews from critics with The New Indian Express stating "the lackluster screenplay abounds in such situations, unconvincing and hard to digest" and "the amateur treatment doesn’t help matters", concluding it's an "effort gone haywire".
