= Rishivandiyam Assembly constituency =

State Legislative Assembly Constituency in Tamil Nadu

Coordinates: 11.81°N 79.10°E

Rishivandiyam
- Constituency No. 78 for the Tamil Nadu Legislative Assembly

Constituency details
- Country: India
- Region: South India
- State: Tamil Nadu
- District: Kallakurichi
- Lok Sabha constituency: Kallakurichi
- Established: 1962
- Total electors: 2,73,641

Member of Legislative Assembly
- 17th Tamil Nadu Legislative Assembly
- Incumbent K. Karthikeyan
- Party: DMK
- Elected year: 2026

Rishivandiyam is a state assembly constituency in Kallakurichi district of Tamil Nadu, India. Its State Assembly Constituency number is 78. It comprises portions of Tirukkoyilur and Sankarapuram taluks. It is part of Kallakurichi Lok Sabha constituency for national elections to the Parliament of India. It is one of the 234 State Legislative Assembly Constituencies in Tamil Nadu.

== Demographics ==
Demographics (2011)
Category	Data
Vanniyar	32%
Mudaliar	11 %
Konar	09%
Kamma Naidu	08%
Muslims	07%
Christians	05%
Chettiars	02%
Others	05%
Total Electorate	2,40,469

== Members of Legislative Assembly ==
Year	Member	Political party
Madras State
1962	L. Anandan	Indian National Congress
1967	M. Anandan	Dravida Munnetra Kazhagam
Tamil Nadu
1971	N. Dharmalingam	Dravida Munnetra Kazhagam
1977	M. Sundaram	Indian National Congress
1980	M. Sundaram	Indian National Congress (I)
1984	S. Sivaraj	Indian National Congress
1989	Ekal M. Natesan	Dravida Munnetra Kazhagam
1991	Dr. M. Govindaraju	All India Anna Dravida Munnetra Kazhagam
1996	S. Sivaraj	Tamil Maanila Congress
2001	S. Sivaraj	Tamil Maanila Congress
2006	S. Sivaraj	Indian National Congress
2011	Vijayakanth	Desiya Murpokku Dravida Kazhagam
2016	K. Karthikeyan	Dravida Munnetra Kazhagam
2021	K. Karthikeyan	Dravida Munnetra Kazhagam
2026	K. Karthikeyan	Dravida Munnetra Kazhagam

== Election results ==
Vote share of winning candidates
2026	36.65%
2021	53.56%
2016	47.08%
2011	53.19%
2006	42.74%
2001	52.37%
1996	61.34%
1991	61.56%
1989	46.96%
1984	51.95%
1980	51.11%
1977	38.42%
1971	51.86%
1967	49.60%
1962	58.82%

=== 2026 ===
2026 Tamil Nadu Legislative Assembly election: Rishivandiyam
Party	Candidate	Votes	%	±%
DMK	Karthikeyan K	89,711	36.65	▼16.91
TVK	Ashok Kumar G	84,849	34.66	New
PMK	Chezhiyan P	56,488	23.08	New
NTK	Radhika P	7,247	2.96	▼2.71
Independent	Senthikumar V N	1,071	0.44	New
Independent	Selvaraj P	800	0.33	New
BSP	Balakrishnan A	578	0.24	New
NOTA	NOTA	534	0.22	▼0.92
Independent	Anbumurugan S	458	0.19	New
Anna Makkal Katchi	Sevvantha G K	322	0.13	New
All India Puratchi Thalaivar Makkal Munnetra Kazhagam	Ranganathan N	302	0.12	New
Parivartan Rajniti Party	Arumugam G	291	0.12	New
Naadaalum Makkal Katchi	Venkatraman J	251	0.10	New
Independent	Karthikeyan A	244	0.10	New
Independent	Manikandan C	241	0.10	New
Independent	Vinoth S	208	0.08	New
Independent	Sezhiyan K	173	0.07	New
TVK	Sankar R	161	0.07	New
Independent	Vijayakumar G	141	0.06	New
Independent	Gowtham C	136	0.06	New
Independent	Raja S	130	0.05	New
Independent	Karthikeyan V	125	0.05	New
Independent	Raja K	98	0.04	New
Independent	Anbu D	90	0.04	New
Independent	Narayanan L	83	0.03	New
Independent	Marikkannu A	63	0.03	New
Margin of victory		4,862	1.99	▼17.63
Turnout		2,44,795	89.46	▲10.17
Registered electors		2,73,641		▲5,410
DMK hold		Swing	▼16.91	

=== 2021 ===
2021 Tamil Nadu Legislative Assembly election: Rishivandiyam
Party	Candidate	Votes	%	±%
DMK	K. Karthikeyan	113,912	53.56	+6.48
AIADMK	S. A. Santhosh	72,184	33.94	−2.72
NTK	R. Suresh Manivannan	12,066	5.67	New
AMMK	S. Prabhu	10,387	4.88	New
NOTA	NOTA	2,420	1.14	New
Independent	K. Murugan	1,508	0.71	New
Margin of victory		41,728	19.62	9.20
Turnout		212,686	79.29	−1.18
Rejected ballots		345	0.16	
Registered electors		268,231		
DMK hold		Swing	6.48	

=== 2016 ===
2016 Tamil Nadu Legislative Assembly election: Rishivandiyam
Party	Candidate	Votes	%	±%
DMK	K. Karthikeyan	92,607	47.08	New
AIADMK	K. Dhandapani	72,104	36.66	New
DMDK	V. J. P. Vincent Jayaraj	14,239	7.24	−45.95
PMK	K. P. Pandiyan	8,148	4.14	New
Independent	S. Barath	1,710	0.87	New
Independent	C. Raphael Raj	1,090	0.55	New
Independent	V. Chandrasekaran	1,022	0.52	New
Margin of victory		20,503	10.42	−7.54
Turnout		196,697	80.47	−2.40
Registered electors		244,427		
DMK gain from DMDK		Swing	-6.11	

=== 2011 ===
2011 Tamil Nadu Legislative Assembly election: Rishivandiyam
Party	Candidate	Votes	%	±%
DMDK	Vijayakanth	91,164	53.19	+37.36
INC	S. Sivaraj	60,369	35.22	−7.52
Independent	M. Vijayakanth	7,355	4.29	New
IJK	P. Natarajan	3,227	1.88	New
Independent	M. Ramajayam	2,044	1.19	New
Loktantrik Samajwadi	J. Selvaraju	1,860	1.09	New
BJP	B. Rajasundaram	1,793	1.05	−0.51
Independent	K. Senthil	1,587	0.93	New
Independent	V. Murugan	1,299	0.76	New
Margin of victory		30,795	17.97	11.78
Turnout		171,405	82.87	14.12
Registered electors		206,830		
DMDK gain from INC		Swing	10.44	

=== 2006 ===
2006 Tamil Nadu Legislative Assembly election: Rishivandiyam
Party	Candidate	Votes	%	±%
INC	S. Sivaraj	54,793	42.74	New
AIADMK	L. Athinarayanan	46,858	36.55	New
DMDK	T. K. Govindan	20,283	15.82	New
Independent	M. Govindaraj	2,757	2.15	New
BJP	B. Raja Sundaram	1,992	1.55	New
LJP	Marur N. Dharmalingam	1,511	1.18	New
Margin of victory		7,935	6.19	−17.22
Turnout		128,194	68.75	6.42
Registered electors		186,451		
INC gain from TMC(M)		Swing	-9.63	

=== 2001 ===
2001 Tamil Nadu Legislative Assembly election: Rishivandiyam
Party	Candidate	Votes	%	±%
TMC(M)	S. Sivaraj	57,108	52.37	New
PNK	T. K. T. Murali	31,576	28.96	New
MDMK	Marudur N. Durairaj	15,470	14.19	+4.54
Independent	G. Arumugam	4,891	4.49	New
Margin of victory		25,532	23.41	−14.26
Turnout		109,045	62.34	−5.30
Registered electors		174,987		
TMC(M) hold		Swing	-8.97	

=== 1996 ===
1996 Tamil Nadu Legislative Assembly election: Rishivandiyam
Party	Candidate	Votes	%	±%
TMC(M)	S. Sivaraj	65,230	61.34	New
AIADMK	P. Annadurai	25,166	23.66	−37.9
MDMK	N. Durairaj	10,263	9.65	New
PMK	N. Subramanian	3,971	3.73	New
Margin of victory		40,064	37.67	2.53
Turnout		106,344	67.64	0.13
Registered electors		164,019		
TMC(M) gain from AIADMK		Swing	-0.22	

=== 1991 ===
1991 Tamil Nadu Legislative Assembly election: Rishivandiyam
Party	Candidate	Votes	%	±%
AIADMK	Dr.M. Govindarajalu	58,030	61.56	+53.31
DMK	M. Thangam	24,899	26.41	−20.54
PMK	P. Vijalakshmi	9,568	10.15	New
Independent	K. Thoppalan	918	0.97	New
Margin of victory		33,131	35.15	29.32
Turnout		94,263	67.51	−12.84
Registered electors		148,616		
AIADMK gain from DMK		Swing	14.61	

=== 1989 ===
1989 Tamil Nadu Legislative Assembly election: Rishivandiyam
Party	Candidate	Votes	%	±%
DMK	Ekal M. Netesa Vdyar	48,030	46.96	+1.13
INC	S. Sivaraj	42,069	41.13	−10.82
AIADMK	T. N. Moorthy	8,436	8.25	New
AIADMK	P. Vijayanan	2,497	2.44	New
India Farmers and Tailers Party	V. Venkataraman	746	0.73	New
Margin of victory		5,961	5.83	−0.30
Turnout		102,287	80.36	2.10
Registered electors		130,994		
DMK gain from INC		Swing	-4.99	

=== 1984 ===
1984 Tamil Nadu Legislative Assembly election: Rishivandiyam
Party	Candidate	Votes	%	±%
INC	S. Sivaraj	43,439	51.95	+0.84
DMK	M. Natesha Udayar	38,318	45.82	New
Independent	K. Thoppalan	1,040	1.24	New
Margin of victory		5,121	6.12	−0.45
Turnout		83,619	78.26	7.71
Registered electors		112,187		
INC hold		Swing	0.84	

=== 1980 ===
1980 Tamil Nadu Legislative Assembly election: Rishivandiyam
Party	Candidate	Votes	%	±%
INC	M. Sundaram	38,238	51.11	+12.69
AIADMK	M. Deiveekan	33,317	44.54	+12.21
Independent	P. Govindasami	2,552	3.41	New
Independent	T. Abdul Wahab	703	0.94	New
Margin of victory		4,921	6.58	0.48
Turnout		74,810	70.54	3.21
Registered electors		108,377		
INC hold		Swing	12.69	

=== 1977 ===
1977 Tamil Nadu Legislative Assembly election: Rishivandiyam
Party	Candidate	Votes	%	±%
INC	M. Sundaram	25,530	38.42	−9.72
AIADMK	M. Deivigam	21,478	32.32	New
JP	K. Jayachandran	12,177	18.33	New
DMK	J. V. Keerthy	5,323	8.01	−43.85
Independent	D. Govindarajan	814	1.23	New
Independent	T. Abdulwahab	685	1.03	New
Margin of victory		4,052	6.10	2.37
Turnout		66,448	67.33	−7.53
Registered electors		101,448		
INC gain from DMK		Swing	-13.44	

=== 1971 ===
1971 Tamil Nadu Legislative Assembly election: Rishivandiyam
Party	Candidate	Votes	%	±%
DMK	N. Dharmalingam	29,350	51.86	+2.27
INC	K. Mappan	27,242	48.14	−0.86
Margin of victory		2,108	3.72	3.13
Turnout		56,592	74.87	−1.95
Registered electors		78,419		
DMK hold		Swing	2.27	

=== 1967 ===
1967 Madras Legislative Assembly election: Rishivandiyam
Party	Candidate	Votes	%	±%
DMK	M. Anandan	26,491	49.60	+8.41
INC	L. Anandan	26,173	49.00	−9.82
Independent	N. T. Singaram	750	1.40	New
Margin of victory		318	0.60	−17.04
Turnout		53,414	76.81	24.47
Registered electors		72,950		
DMK gain from INC		Swing	-9.22	

=== 1962 ===
1962 Madras Legislative Assembly election: Rishivandiyam
Party	Candidate	Votes	%	±%
INC	L. Anandan	25,057	58.82	New
DMK	M. Anadan	17,544	41.18	New
Margin of victory		7,513	17.64	
Turnout		42,601	52.34	
Registered electors		86,840		
INC win (new seat)				
