= Dharma Teja =

- Directed by: Perala
- Based on: Poonthotta Kaavalkaaran (1988)
- Produced by: Sainath
- Starring: Krishnam Raju; Sharada; Radhika; Vani Viswanath
- Music by: Vidyasagar
- Release date: November 18, 1988
- Country: India
- Language: Telugu

Dharma Teja is a 1988 Indian Telugu-language film directed by Perala and produced by Sainath. It stars Krishnam Raju, Sharada, Radhika and Vani Viswanath. The music was composed by Vidyasagar. The film was a remake of Tamil film Poonthotta Kaavalkaaran.

== Cast ==
- Krishnam Raju as Dharma Teja
- Sharada
- Radhika as Sampoorna
- Vani Viswanath
- Anand
- Ranganath as Ramkumar
- Kota Srinivasa Rao as Sarabhaiah
- Jaggayya as D.S.P. Chakrapani
- Sivakrishna as Sambaiah
- Manik Irani as Sher Khan

== Soundtrack ==
Dharma Teja

Soundtrack album by Vidyasagar
- Released: 1988
- Genre: Feature film soundtrack
- Length: Telugu
- Producer: Vidyasagar

Vidyasagar chronology
Poo Manam (1989)	Dharma Teja (1988)

The music and background score for the film were composed by Vidyasagar. All songs were written by Sirivennela Seetharama Sastry.

=== Track listing ===
Title	Singers
"Chikkenamma Chakkanamma"	SP Balu, P. Susheela
"Eda Meete Vanajallu"	SP Balu, S. Janaki
"Pachchani Muchchata"	SP Balu, S Janaki
"Sambaralu Jaragali"	SP Balu
"Velliponi Vidichi"	SP Balu
