= Paattukku Oru Thalaivan =

- Poster
- Directed by: Liaquat Ali Khan
- Story by: Ibrahim Rowther
- Produced by: T. Siva; A. Tamil Fathima
- Starring: Vijayakanth; Shobana
- Cinematography: Rajarajan
- Edited by: G. Jayachandran
- Music by: Ilaiyaraaja
- Production company: Tamilannai Cine Creation
- Release date: 17 March 1989
- Running time: 140 minutes
- Country: India
- Language: Tamil

Paattukku Oru Thalaivan (transl. A leader for the song) is a 1989 Indian Tamil language romantic drama film, directed by Liaquat Ali Khan. The film stars Vijayakanth and Shobana. It was released on 17 March 1989.

== Plot ==
The movie starts with Arivu fighting against some goons, where he meets Shanthi. He gets drunk and is confronted by his mother Shenbagam. When his best friend Vicky asks about his past, his mother tells his story.

In the flashback, Arivu is an innocent son of Veluchami, who is an atheist. Their family has troubles with local M.L.A Marudhanayagam. Arivu falls in love with his daughter Shanthi, who comes to the village for vacation. When Veluchami goes to Marudhanayagam's house with the alliance he is embarrassed by them, Shanthi also denies ever loving his son. He dies in shock and Arivu is moved to Chennai. He became a drunkard to forget Shanthi.

Shanthi tries to convince Arivu that she is not guilty, but he never gives her a chance. Shenbagam meets with an accident and Shanthi saves her life by donating blood and even paying her hospital bills. Shanthi tells the truth to Shenbagam that she lied that day to save the life of Veluchami, who was surrounded by her fathers gunmen unknown to them. She tried to tell the truth and run away, but was caught and locked up in a room by her father.

Arivu, still not convinced, hates Shanthi. He learns the truth from his mother and also come to know that Shanthi's marriage has been fixed. Shanthi tries to commit suicide and is saved by Arivu.

== Cast ==
- Vijayakanth as Arivu
- Shobana as Shanthi
- M. N. Nambiar as Veluchami, Arivu's father
- K. R. Vijaya as Shenbagam, Arivu's mother
- Vijayakumar as M.L.A Marudhanayagam
- Livingston
- S. S. Chandran as Singaram
- Janagaraj as Vicky
- Senthil as Azhagu
- Kovai Sarala as Selvi
- S. Sathyendra as a villager (uncredited)

== Soundtrack ==
The music was composed by Ilaiyaraaja.

Track listing
| No. | Title | Lyrics | Singer(s) | Length |
|---|---|---|---|---|
| 1. | "Ninaithathu Yaaro" | Gangai Amaran | Mano and Jikki | 05:09 |
| 2. | "Ellorudaiya Vazhkaiyilum Oru Pombala" (version 2) | Ilaiyaraaja | Ilaiyaraaja | 04:21 |
| 3. | "Chitta Chitta Chinukku Than" | Gangai Amaran | Malaysia Vasudevan and chorus | 04:25 |
| 4. | "Azhagiya Nadhi Enna" | Gangai Amaran | S. P. Balasubrahmanyam and K. S. Chithra | 04:23 |
| 5. | "Isaiyile Naan Vasamaaginen" | Gangai Amaran | Malaysia Vasudevan and K. S. Chithra | 04:25 |
| 6. | "Ellorum Rasaanna Puthu Jananga" | Ilaiyaraaja | Malaysia Vasudevan and chorus | 02:36 |
| 7. | "Ninaithathu Yaaro" (sad) | Gangai Amaran | Mano and S. Janaki | 04:32 |
| 8. | "Ellorudaiya Vazhkaiyilum Oru Pombala" (version 1) | Ilaiyaraaja | S. P. Balasubrahmanyam | 04:21 |
| 9. | "Paattukku Thalaiva² Naan Paduthuma" (bonus) | Ilaiyaraaja | Ilaiyaraaja | 02:58 |
| Total length: | | | | 37:10 |

== Release and reception ==
Paattukku Oru Thalaivan was released on 17 March 1989. P. S. S. of Kalki wrote Vijayakanth would have done better if he had paid even one tenth of the attention to the story and the character development instead of the fight scenes and the outfits.
