= Liaquat Ali Khan (director) =

Indian director and screenwriter

- Occupations: Director, screenwriter, dialogue writer

Liaquat Ali Khan (/lɪjɑːkəθ əlɪ xɑːn/) is an Indian film director and screenwriter who has worked on Tamil films. He was primarily active in the 1990s, collaborating with Vijayakanth and R. K. Selvamani for several films in the politics genre.

== Personal life ==
In 2006, Liaquat Ali Khan pledged his allegiance to the political party, All India Anna Dravida Munnetra Kazhagam. The move came after his friend and confidante Vijayakanth left him out of his newly floated political party. He was also appointed as Electoral Officer to conduct Small Screen Actors Association Polls.

== Awards ==
- Kalaimamani Award - 2019
- Dinakaran Cinema Award for Best Dialogue writer - for Arasiyal

== Filmography ==
Director

Year	Film	Notes
1989	Paattukku Oru Thalaivan	
1993	Ezhai Jaathi	
1993	Kattalai	
1993	Enga Muthalali	
1995	Rani Maharani	Also producer
1999	Suyamvaram	

Writer

- Films apart from the above where Liaquat Ali Khan received writing credits.
- Annai En Deivam (1986)
- Poonthotta Kaavalkaaran (1988)
- Uzhaithu Vaazha Vendum (1988)
- Thaai Paasam (1988)
- Thangachi (1988)
- Aatha Naan Pass Ayittaen (1990)
- Pulan Visaranai (1990)
- Captain Prabhakaran (1991)
- Vetri Padigal (1991)
- Maanagara Kaaval (1991)
- Moondrezhuthil En Moochirukkum (1991)
- Thai Mozhi (1992)
- Sakkarai Devan (1993)
- Makkal Aatchi (1995)
- Delhi Diary (1996)
- Thadayam (1997)
- Aravindhan (1997)
- Arasiyal (1997)
- Aasai Thambi (1998)
- Ulavuthurai (1998)
- Unmai (1998)
- Mannavaru Chinnavaru (1999)
- Shanmuga Pandian (2000)
- Bharatha Rathna (2000)
- Vaanchinathan (2001)
- Gajendra (2004)
- Kuttrapathirikai (2007)
- Pulan Visaranai 2 (2015)
- Arase (2007-2009) (Dialogue writer as well acted in the character Singaperumal)
