= Srushti Dange =

Indian actress

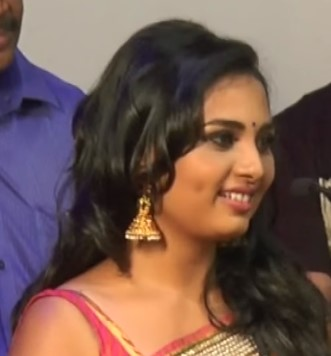
- Srushti Dange at Saravanan Irukka Bayamaen press meet
- Born: Srushti Danghe
- Other name: Shuruthi
- Occupation: Actress
- Years active: 2010–present

Srushti Dange is an Indian actress, who has mostly appeared in Tamil films and appears in a few Telugu and Malayalam films. She is also the runner up of the reality cooking show Cooku with Comali.

== Career ==
She debuted with the Tamil movie Kadhalagi (2010). Srushti Dange initially appeared in supporting roles, playing a victim in Myshkin's Yuddham Sei (2011), before playing a supporting role in the Telugu film, April Fool (2014). Srushti made a breakthrough portraying the lead role in the romantic thriller Megha (2014), winning mixed reviews for her performance in the title role. In 2015, she was seen in the horror film Darling, the psychological thriller film Enakkul Oruvan and Puriyadha Anandam Puthithaga Arambam, a romantic film which launches Krish in the leading role.

In 2016, she appeared in four Tamil films: the Dharma Durai, Vijay Vasanth's Achamindri, the romantic comedy Navarasa Thilagam, in which she plays a medical student, and the Suseenthiran production Vil Ambu. In 2017, she made her Malayalam debut with the film 1971: Beyond Borders. She was seen in the horror comedy films such as Pottu (2019) and Chandramukhi 2 (2023).

In 2023, she appeared as a special guest in the BiggBoss house.

== Filmography ==
Key
†	Denotes films that have not yet been released

Year	Title	Role	Language	Notes
2010	Kadhalagi	Nandhini Velu Nachiyar	Tamil	Debut film; Tamil
2011	Yuddham Sei	Suja	Tamil	
2014	April Fool	Satya	Telugu	Telugu debut
2014	Megha	Meghavathy Srinivasan	Tamil	
2015	Darling	Swati	Tamil	
2015	Enakkul Oruvan	Herself	Tamil	
2015	Puriyadha Anandam Puthithaga Arambam	Amudha	Tamil	
2015	Kaththukkutti	Bhuvana	Tamil	
2016	Vil Ambu	Nithya	Tamil	
2016	Navarasa Thilagam	Chithra	Tamil	
2016	Jithan 2	Priya (the sprit girl)	Tamil	
2016	Parvathipuram	Shruti	Telugu	partially reshot as Veera Khadgam in 2023
2016	Dharma Durai	Stella	Tamil	
2016	Achamindri	Malarvizhi	Tamil	
2017	Mupparimanam	Anusha	Tamil	
2017	1971: Beyond Borders	Chinmay's wife	Malayalam	Malayalam debut
2017	Saravanan Irukka Bayamaen	Fathima	Tamil	
2017	Oye Ninne	Vedha	Telugu	
2018	W/O Ram	Escort	Telugu	Minor role
2018	Kaala Koothu	Revathi	Tamil	
2019	Sathru	Darshini	Tamil	
2019	Pottu	Nithya	Tamil	
2020	Rajavukku Check	Aathira	Tamil	
2021	Chakra	Rithu Bhatia	Tamil	
2023	Chandramukhi 2	Priya	Tamil	
2023	Kattil	Dhanam	Tamil	
2025	Mahasenha	Bommi	Tamil	
2026	The Bed	Christy	Tamil	

=== Television ===
Year	Show	Role	Channel	Language	Notes
2019	Lots of Love (LOL)		MX Player	Telugu	Web Series
2021	Survivor Tamil	Participant	Zee Tamil	Tamil	Eliminated Day 8
2023	Cook with Comali Season 4	Contestant	Star Vijay	Tamil	1st Runner-up
2023	Bigg Boss (Tamil season 7)	Guest	Star Vijay	Tamil	Deepavali Celebration along with Pugazh
