= Rajadurai (film) =

- Theatrical release poster
- Directed by: S. A. Chandrasekhar
- Screenplay by: S. A. Chandrasekhar
- Story by: Shoba Chandrasekhar
- Produced by: A. S. Ibrahim Rowther
- Starring: Vijayakanth; Jayasudha; Sivaranjani; Anandaraj
- Cinematography: Rajarajan
- Edited by: Goutham Raj
- Music by: Deva
- Production company: Rowther Films
- Release date: 11 September 1993
- Running time: 153 minutes
- Country: India
- Language: Tamil

Rajadurai (/ˈrɑːdʒəθʊraɪ/ transl. Royal Senate) (Note: Also the title character.) is a 1993 Indian Tamil-language action drama film, directed by S. A. Chandrasekhar and produced by A. S. Ibrahim Rowther. The film stars Vijayakanth, Jayasudha, Sivaranjani and Anandaraj. It revolves around a police officer, whose son turns against him after being brainwashed by his father's enemy. The film was released on 11 September 1993.

== Plot ==
Rajadurai, an honest police officer, arrests and humiliates a criminal Mayandi, who swears revenge. Once Mayandi gets out of prison, he kidnaps Rajadurai's son Vijay. He later brings him up as Arun along with his own son in such a way that Vijay would do anything for him. In fact, Mayandi uses him as a weapon against his own father.

Years later, Mayandi who has taken the name of Manohar is a large kingpin; a wolf in sheep's clothing who has a great influence in the government. Rajadurai is transferred to this area to control the crimes. His wife Uma spots an injured Vijay, recognizes him as her long-lost son, and takes him to the hospital, from where he manages to escape from the police in pursuit. Later, Rajadurai confronts his son when he tries to smuggle goods illegally as per Manohar's instructions. Rajadurai brutally beats his son when he refuses to reveal the truth. Manohar uses the situation to develop a grudge against Rajadurai inside Vijay.

Later, Vijay is married to a crook, Suriya, and Rajadurai is made the chief escort for the minister who is the main guest by Manohar humiliating the officer. After marriage, the couple is asked by Manohar to stay in Rajadurai's house. Though Uma welcomes them wholeheartedly, Rajadurai is suspicious and pretends to accept them. Suriya reforms and later turns against her own husband when he criticizes his own parents. Again a part of Manohar's game, Rajadurai and Uma leaves their house. Uma, whose health worsens, asks her husband to bring Vijay as her last wish. However, Manohar refuses to send him, due to which Rajadurai is forced to act as Vijay to fulfill his wife's wish, but his identity is revealed, and Uma dies instantly, heartbroken.

Having enough, Rajadurai sets out to nab Manohar and his son. At the last moment, Vijay understands his mistake and kills Manohar with the help of his father, after which he surrenders.

== Cast ==
- Vijayakanth as DCP Rajadurai and Vijay Kumar / Arun
- Jayasudha as Uma
- Sivaranjani as Suriya
- Anandaraj as Mayandi / Manohar
- R. Sundarrajan
- Srihari
- Thalapathy Dinesh
- Peeli Sivam
- Vellai Subbaiah
- Karuppu Subbiah
- Thiraineethi Selvam
- Bhanupriya as Radha in a special appearance
- Major Sundarrajan in a guest appearance
- V. Gopalakrishnan in a guest appearance

== Production ==
The song "Radha Radha" choreographed by Prabhu Deva was initially picturised for another film starring Vijayakanth; since it was not included in that film it was used instead for Rajadurai.

== Soundtrack ==
The music was composed by Deva.

Song	Singers	Lyrics	Length
"Oosi Malakkadu"	S. Janaki, Mano	Vaali	05:09
"Muthu Muthu Aani Muthu (Happy)"	Mano, K. S. Chithra	Pulamaipithan	05:08
"Muthu Muthu Aani Muthu" (Sad)	K. S. Chithra	Pulamaipithan	01:11
"Pillaikkoru Thagappanundu"	S. P. Balasubrahmanyam	Vaali	04:59
"Kaadu Varai"	Deva	R. V. Udayakumar	00:35
"Oru Sandhana Meniyil"	S. Janaki, Mano	R. V. Udayakumar	04:56
"Radha Hey Radha"	S. P. Balasubrahmanyam, S. Janaki	Gangai Amaran	05:49

== Critical reception ==
Malini Mannath of The Indian Express wrote, ".. the story being a rehash of earlier ones, the screenplay full of gaps and actor not quite carrying off the double role, the film [..] is a disappointment". C. R. K. of Kalki said that, despite the son character being too similar to Vijayakanth's earlier roles, the actor showed new acting dimensions in his performance as the father.

== In other media ==
The story of Rajadurai became the basis for another Tamil film The Greatest of All Time (2024), which featured Vijayakanth in an AI appearance.
