= Enga Muthalali =

- Theatrical release poster
- Directed by: Liaquat Ali Khan
- Written by: Panchu Arunachalam
- Produced by: Meena Panchu Arunachalam
- Starring: Vijayakanth; Kasthuri
- Cinematography: Rajarajan
- Edited by: Ashok Metha
- Music by: Ilaiyaraaja
- Production company: P. A. Art Productions
- Release date: 13 November 1993
- Running time: 150 minutes
- Country: India
- Language: Tamil

Enga Muthalali (transl. Our Boss) is a 1993 Indian Tamil-language drama film directed by Liaquat Ali Khan and written by Panchu Arunachalam. The film stars Vijayakanth and Kasthuri. It was released on 13 November 1993.

== Plot ==
Vijayaragunatha, a compassionate landlord and village chieftain, resides with his mother while his younger brother, Balakrishna "Balu", pursues his college education. Vijayaragunathan witnesses his cousin, Jayarama, murdering a poor farmer and refuses to withhold his testimony despite his uncle Narayana's pleas to lie. As a result, Jayarama is sentenced to life imprisonment. Narayana seeks revenge against Vijayaragunatha's family for his son's imprisonment. He exploits Seetharama, the caste union leader's caste-oriented sentiments to create divisions within the community. Vijayaragunathan, who advocates for equality, opposes these decisions, which leads to a confrontation between Vijayaragunathan and Seetharaman. Seetharaman, also Vijayaragunathan's brother-in-law, mistakenly believes Vijayaragunathan orchestrated the humiliation. Seetharaman's daughter, Kalyani, has been in love with Vijayaragunathan since childhood. When Seetharaman discovers their meetings, he beats Kalyani and arranges her marriage to another groom. However, none of the prospective grooms accept due to fear of Vijayaragunathan.

Seetharaman ultimately settles on Panduranga "Bambaram Pandu", the immature son of Godhandarama, who agrees to the marriage due to his interest in Seetharaman's property. Vijayaragunathan crashes the wedding, fights off the goons, and helps Kalyani confess her true feelings to the gathered relatives. Despite Seetharaman's objections, Vijayaragunathan and Kalyani get married. Narayana and his relatives await an opportunity to manipulate Balu against his brother Vijayaragunathan. Meanwhile, Balu falls in love with Kaveri, the daughter of Seetharaman's mistress, Vani Nair. Before departing for Delhi, Balu promises Kaveri that he will marry her, a vow witnessed by Kalyani. Balu and Kaveri eventually consummate their relationship. Narayana and his sons deceive Balu, claiming that if he leaves for Delhi, Vijayaragunathan will monopolize the family's wealth and make Balu stay in the village, sowing discord between the brothers.

Vijayaragunathan discovers Balu's love for Kaveri and approaches Seetharaman to request her hand in marriage for Balu. Seetharaman, overwhelmed by Vijayaragunatha's gesture, agrees to the union. However, Parvathi, Vijayaragunatha's sister, refuses to accept the marriage, citing the societal implications of Balu marrying the daughter of her husband's mistress. Narayanan further manipulates Balu, falsely claiming that Vijayaragunathan rejected a lucrative marriage proposal from Krishna's daughter on Balu's behalf. Narayanan advises Balu to keep Kaveri as his mistress and marry Krishna's daughter instead. Trusting Narayanan's words, Balu calls off the marriage. Vijayaragunathan implores Balu to explain his sudden change of heart, but Balu remains obstinate. In a fit of anger, Vijayaragunathan slaps Balu, who enraged, abandons their home. Narayana exploits Balu's vulnerability, urging him to partition their ancestral property. But, Vijayaragunathan transfers the entire property to Balu and leaves the house with his mother and Kalyani.

Meanwhile, Jayarama is released from Salem prison on bail and is made to stay in Salem. During Balu's engagement with Krishna's daughter, Kaveri interrupts, confronting Balu demanding justice for impregnating her. Balu lashes out at Kaveri. Narayana secretly brings Jayarama back to the village and orchestrates Kaveri's murder, using a knife with Balu's fingerprints, and plants the knife in Balu's belongings, framing him for the crime. Balu is falsely arrested and charged with Kaveri's murder. Seetharaman witnesses the murder and is subsequently kidnapped by Jayarama, who tries to coerce him into committing suicide. Vijayaragunathan intervenes, fighting off Jayarama and his men, and protects Seetharaman. Seetharaman then brings the police and, using a letter signed by himself on behalf of Narayana, ensures Narayana and Jayarama's arrest. With the truth revealed, Balu is released from prison, and the family reunites, with Balu now reformed.

== Cast ==
- Vijayakanth as Vijayaragunatha
- Kasthuri as Kalyani
- Radha Ravi as Seetharama
- Raja as Balakrishna "Balu"
- R. Sundarrajan as Narayana
- Napoleon as Jayarama, Narayana's son
- John Amirtharaj as Krishna
- Vellai Subbaiah as a marriage broker
- Karuppu Subbiah as Karuppusamy
- Pasi Narayanan as a marriage broker
- Vennira Aadai Moorthy as Godhandarama, Pandurangan's father
- Thiyagu as Nanjappan
- Vivek as Panduranga 'Bambaram Pandu'
- Junior Balaiah as Narayana's relative
- Nalinikanth as Narayana's relative
- Sumithra as Parvathi
- Vichithra as Kaveri
- S. N. Parvathy as Pandurangan's mother
- Dubbing Janaki as Vijayaragunatha, Balu and Parvathi's mother
- C. R. Saraswathi as Vani Nair, Kaveri's Mother
- Thalapathi Dinesh as a henchman (uncredited)

== Soundtrack ==
The music was composed by Ilaiyaraaja.

Song	Singer(s)	Lyrics	Length
"Bhoomikkum Saamikkum"	Mano, K. S. Chithra	Vaali	5:05
"Kolli Malai"	Mano, Swarnalatha	Vaali	4:49
"Kungumam Manjalukku (Ragam: Rathnakanthi)"	K. J. Yesudas, S. Janaki	Vaali	5:00
"Mahathaana Uravugalai"	S. P. Balasubrahmanyam	Vaali	4:44
"Marumagale"	S. P. Balasubrahmanyam, K. S. Chithra	Panchu Arunachalam	5:01

== Critical reception ==
Malini Mannath of The Indian Express wrote, "Liyakat Ali Khan's treatment is fairly neat and he has tackled a subject that is different". Thulasi of Kalki, however, found the film to be clichéd and predictable.
