= Sakkarai Devan =

- Poster
- Directed by: J. Panneer
- Screenplay by: Liaquat Ali Khan
- Story by: R. Selvaraj
- Produced by: A. S. Ibrahim Rawuthar
- Starring: Vijayakanth; Sukanya; Kanaka
- Cinematography: Rajarajan
- Edited by: G. Jayachandran
- Music by: Ilaiyaraaja
- Production company: I. V. Cini Productions
- Release date: 10 July 1993
- Running time: 154 minutes
- Country: India
- Language: Tamil

Sakkarai Devan is a 1993 Indian Tamil-language action drama film, directed by J. Panneer (in his directorial debut) and produced by A. S. Ibrahim Rowther. The film stars Vijayakanth, Sukanya and Kanaka. It was released on 10 July 1993.

== Plot ==
Sakkarai Devan makes and sells jaggery. On a visit to a neighbouring village, he falls in love with Sarasu, on whom the village landlord Vairaperumal had already cast his eye. Sarasu's widowed brother Vaiyapuri is arrested following an altercation with Vairaperumal over his sister. Dhanam, an orphan, given refuge by Sakkarai, realising her love is one-sided, marries Vaiyapuri. Sakkarai's popularity with the villagers and his attempts to unite them against Vairaperumal invite the latter's ire.

== Cast ==
- Vijayakanth as Sakkarai Devan
- Sukanya as Sarasu
- Kanaka as Dhanam
- M. N. Nambiar as Sarasu's grandfather
- Nassar as Vaiyapuri
- Mohan Natarajan as Vairaperumal
- Thyagu as Ponnambalam
- R. Sundarrajan as Appu
- Gandhimathi as Sakkarai Devan's mother
- Senthil
- Vadivelu
- C. K. Saraswathi
- Baby Monisha as Revathi

== Production ==
The story of Sakkarai Devan was written by R. Selvaraj. He revealed when he visited sugarcane plants in Alanganallur, it reminded him of sugarcane plants owned by his grandfather which prompted him to write a screenplay based on this backdrop. R. V. Udayakumar was supposed to direct the film but due to some reasons he left. He was replaced by J. Panneer, who earlier assisted Aabavanan, making his directorial debut. Selvaraj felt the film felt short of the taste they created after Udayakumar left the film. Balaji Sakthivel worked as an assistant director.

== Soundtrack ==
The music was composed by Ilaiyaraaja, with lyrics by Vaali. The song "Love Love" is set to the raga Chakravakam, "Manjal Poosum" is set to Sivaranjani, and "Nalla Velli" is set to Sankarabharanam.

Song	Singers	Length
"L.o.v.e Love Love"	Malaysia Vasudevan, S. Janaki	04:50
"Manjal Poosum"	Malaysia Vasudevan, S. Janaki	04:58
"Nalla Velli"	Ilaiyaraaja	04:54
"Pattathu Yaanai"	T. S. Raghavendra, Krishnamoorthy	05:54
"Thanner Kudam"	S. Janaki	04:43
"Thanner Kudam – short version"	Malaysia Vasudevan, S. Janaki	02:19

== Reception ==
Malini Mannath of The Indian Express wrote, "Despite the story being an oft-repeated one, Panneer's narration is fairly neat and his handling of the subject confident". K. Vijiyan of New Straits Times wrote "Sakkarai Devan should go down well with Vijayakanth's fans".

== Legacy ==
The song "Manjal Poosum" was also used in Vaazhai (2024).

== Bibliography ==
- Sundararaman (2007) [2005]. Raga Chintamani: A Guide to Carnatic Ragas Through Tamil Film Music (2nd ed.). Pichhamal Chintamani. OCLC 295034757.
