= Anand (actor) =

Indian actor

- Born: 21 February 1968 (age 58); Hyderabad, Andhra Pradesh (now in Telangana), India
- Occupation: Actor
- Years active: 1988–present
- Spouse: Poornima (m. 2002)
- Children: 1

Anand Bharathi is an Indian actor who works predominantly in Telugu, Tamil, and Malayalam films, and television shows. The actor's biggest film till date is Mani Ratnam's black comedy Thiruda Thiruda (1993), but unlike his co-stars of that film, it failed to translate into a breakthrough for him. He has also played second lead roles and supporting characters in several films including Kamal Haasan's Sathyaa and Vijayakanth's Poonthotta Kaavalkaaran.

== Early and personal life ==
Anand was born in Hyderabad as the youngest of four sons. His father V. S. Bharathi, worked for Brooke Bond India Ltd, and his mother Rajalakshmi is a house wife. His brothers are B. Ramesh, a Vice President of Finance with Times of India, Dr. B. Suresh, a teacher at English Vivekananda College, and Bharat Arun, a former Indian cricketer and now bowling coach for Indian cricket team. Anand also owns a restaurant named Zenzerro in Thiruvananthapuram.

Anand has been married to actress Poornima since 2002.

== Career ==
He made his film debut in 1987 with Vanna Kanavugal. He is best known for his works in films such as Sathya (1988), Anbe En Anbe (1988), Apoorva Sagodharargal (1989), Oor Mariyadhai (1992), Thalaivasal (1992), and Thiruda Thiruda (1993), screened at the Toronto International Film Festival.

His works as a character actor include hits such as 1: Nenokkadine (2014), Ring Master (2014), Ivan Maryadaraman (2015), Srimanthudu (2015), and Gentleman (2016).

== Legal issues ==
In 2000, the actor was involved in a drunk driving hit-and-run case, where he hit a police officer who had tried to stop him. The police officer, Ramachandran, subsequently died due to his injuries and the actor faced a murder charge. The actor made a financial settlement with the victim's family. Later he was acquitted.

His house in Uthandi, Chennai was burgled in 2008 and the actor cited that it was an "inside job".

== Filmography ==
Year	Title	Role	Language	Notes
1987	Vanna Kanavugal		Tamil	
1988	Sathya	Anand	Tamil	
1988	Poonthotta Kaavalkaaran	Anand	Tamil	
1988	Anbe En Anbe		Tamil	
1988	Dharma Teja		Telugu	
1988	Annanagar Mudhal Theru	Flirty son	Tamil	
1988	Sudhanthira Naattin Adimaigal		Tamil	
1989	Apoorva Sagodharargal	Vincent	Tamil	
1989	En Kanavar		Tamil	
1990	Nila Penne	Krishnamoorthy	Tamil	
1990	Adhisaya Manithan	Vivek	Tamil	
1990	Kadapa Redamma		Telugu	
1990	Anjali		Tamil	Cameo appearance in a song
1991	Master Plan	Antony	Malayalam	
1991	En Pottukku Sonthakkaran		Tamil	
1991	Manchi Roju		Telugu	
1991	Adhikari	Sarath	Tamil	
1992	Oor Mariyadhai	Kannan	Tamil	
1992	Thalaivasal	Sudhakar	Tamil	
1992	Mudhal Kural	Kumaran	Tamil	
1993	Chinna Mapillai	Mythili's husband	Tamil	
1993	Thiruda Thiruda	Kadhir	Tamil	
1993	Naan Pesa Ninaipathellam	Anand	Tamil	
1994	Muthal Payanam		Tamil	
1994	Ammayi Kapuram	Aravind	Telugu	
1995	Kizhakku Malai		Tamil	
1995	Aunty	Anand	Telugu	
1995	Street Fighter		Telugu	
1995	Khaidi Inspector	Kumar	Telugu	
1996	Avathara Purushan	Anand	Tamil	
1996	Merupu	Naveen	Telugu	
1996	Srikaram	Chandram	Telugu	
1996	Akka Bagunnava	Mohan	Telugu	
1996	Amma Nanna Kaavaali		Telugu	
1996	Pellala Rajyam	Gopi	Telugu	
1997	Kurralla Rajyam		Telugu	
1998	Kondattam	Anand	Tamil	
1998	Sollamale	Riyaz	Tamil	
1998	Snehithulu	Vijay	Telugu	
1999	Ninaivirukkum Varai	Aravind	Tamil	
1999	Malabar Police	Anand	Tamil	
1999	Seenu	Riyaz	Telugu	
1999	Unnaruge Naan Irundhal	Anand	Tamil	
1999	Aasaiyil Oru Kaditham	Anand	Tamil	
2000	Vaanathaippola	Anand	Tamil	
2000	Maa Annayya	Anand	Telugu	
2000	Ennavalle	Anand	Tamil	
2001	Vande Matharam	Citizen rights council member	Kannada	
2001	Deevinchandi		Telugu	
2001	Love Channel	Anand	Tamil	
2001	Sri Manjunatha	Manjunatha's friend	Kannada	
2002	Red	Radha krishnan	Tamil	
2002	Raajjiyam	Kiran Kumar	Tamil	
2003	Naaga		Telugu	
2003	Enakku 20 Unakku 18	Sridhar's brother-in-law	Tamil	Bilingual film; guest appearance
2003	Nee Manasu Naaku Telusu	Sridhar's brother-in-law	Telugu	Bilingual film; guest appearance
2004	Swetha Naagu	Tribal man	Telugu; Kannada	
2005	The Tiger	Sudev Sachidanand / Musafir	Malayalam	
2005	Thommanum Makkalum	Kaliyappan	Malayalam	
2005	Alaiyadikkuthu		Tamil	
2005	Udayananu Tharam	Dinesh	Malayalam	
2006	Yes Your Honour	DFO Sarath Shetty	Malayalam	
2006	Vargam	Sheriff	Malayalam	
2006	Chacko Randaaman	Kaalan Madhavan	Malayalam	
2006	Oruvan	SI Madhavan	Malayalam	
2007	Payum Puli	Ravishankar	Malayalam	
2007	July 4	Vincent	Malayalam	
2007	Inspector Garud	Saravanan	Malayalam	
2007	Ali Bhai	Bhaskaran	Malayalam	
2008	Aandavan	Sadashivan	Malayalam	
2009	Josh	Sathya's father	Telugu	
2009	Muthirai	Azhagar Thondaiman	Tamil	
2010	Marykkundoru Kunjaadu	Johnykutty	Malayalam	
2010	Advocate Lakshman Ladies Only	Haridas	Malayalam	
2010	Thanthonni		Malayalam	
2010	The Thriller	Manmohan	Malayalam	
2010	Andari Bandhuvaya		Telugu	
2011	Arjunan Sakshi	Rajan Thomas	Malayalam	
2011	Christian Brothers	Renjith	Malayalam	
2012	Etho Seithai Ennai	Nambi	Tamil	
2012	Kunjaliyan	Suresh Varma	Malayalam	
2012	Ajantha	Singer	Kannada; Malayalam	
2012	My Boss	Mathew Abraham	Malayalam	
2012	MLA Mani: Patham Classum Gusthiyum	Ananthan	Malayalam	
2013	Crocodile Love Story	DFO	Malayalam	
2013	Careebeyans	Shiva Subramaniyam	Malayalam	
2014	1: Nenokkadine	Chandrasekhar	Telugu	
2014	Ring Master	Raju	Malayalam	
2015	Ivan Maryadaraman	Indrasimhan	Malayalam	
2015	Srimanthudu	Meghana's father	Telugu	
2015	365 Days	Chandrasekhar	Telugu	
2016	Kalyana Vaibhogame	Divya's father	Telugu	
2016	Gentleman	Ram Prakash	Telugu	
2016	Aatadukundam Raa	Anand Rao	Telugu	
2016	Oozham	Karthikeyan	Malayalam	
2017	Mister	Chai's father	Telugu	
2017	Thikka	Madan Mohan	Telugu	
2017	Rangoon	Syed Nawazuddin	Tamil	
2017	Vunnadhi Okate Zindagi	Abhi's father	Telugu	
2017	Villain	Dinesh Tharakan	Malayalam	
2018	Savyasachi	Mahalakshmi's husband	Telugu	
2018	Juvva	Sivakrishna Hegde	Telugu	
2019	Sye Raa Narasimha Reddy	Kumara Mallareddy	Telugu	
2019	Maharshi	Ramavaram District Collector	Telugu	
2019	Dear Comrade	Bobby's father	Telugu	
2020	IIT Krishnamurthy	Srinivasa Rao	Telugu	
2020	Joshua		Malayalam	
2021	Cold Case	Aadhavan Padmanabhan	Malayalam	
2021	Varudu Kaavalenu	Karthik's father	Telugu	
2023	Paayum Oli Nee Yenakku		Tamil	
2023	Kolai	Tilak Varma	Tamil	
2024	Siddharth Roy		Telugu	
2025	Dilruba		Telugu	
2025	Arjun Son of Vyjayanthi	Vishwanath	Telugu	
2026	Parasakthi	MP Bhaskar Rao	Tamil	
2026	Sky		Telugu	
2026	Maa Inti Bangaaram	Ramaiah Raju	Telugu	
2026	Rao Bahadur	A. Jagannadhan	Telugu	

=== Television ===
Year	Title	Network	Language
1998	Peyarai Solla Vaa	Sun TV	Tamil
2000	Nippulanti Nijam	ETV	Telugu
2001	Sigaram	Sun TV	Tamil
2001	Soolam	Sun TV	Tamil
2004	Aalipazham	Surya TV	Malayalam
2005	Kadamattathu Kathanar	Asianet	Malayalam
2006	Ezham Kadalinakkare	Asianet	Malayalam
2007	Swami Ayyappan	Asianet	Malayalam
2010–2012	Idhayam	Sun TV	Tamil
2011	Devimahatmyam	Asianet	Malayalam
2011	Sabarimala Shridharma Shastha	Asianet	Malayalam
2012	Veera Marthandavarma	Surya TV	Malayalam
2012	Dost	Kairali TV	Malayalam
2015	Spandanam	Surya TV	Malayalam
2015	7 Raatrikal	Asianet	Malayalam
2016–2017	Kayamkulam Kochunniyude Makan	Surya TV	Malayalam
2018	Lahiri Lahiri Lahirilo	ETV	Telugu
2020–2021	Ammayariyathe	Asianet	Malayalam
2020–2023	Anbe Vaa	Sun TV	Tamil
2021	Kannana Kanne	Sun TV	Tamil
2021	Rudramadevi	Star Maa	Telugu
2025	Teacheramma	Asianet	Malayalam
2026–Present	Podarillu	Star Maa	Telugu

=== Other work ===
Title	Language	Notes
Kassu Panam Thuttu Money Money	Malayalam	short film; as director and producer
