= Subhashri =

Indian actress (born 1975)

- Born: 18 July 1978 (age 48); Chennai, India
- Occupation: Actress
- Years active: 1993-1997
- Spouse: Neeraj Bhuvania (m. 1998)
- Children: 1
- Relatives: Malashri (sister)

Bharathi Bhuvania (née Pandey; 18 July 1975) widely known by her stage name Subhashri is an Indian former actress known for her works in Telugu, Tamil, Kannada, and Malayalam language films. She is the sister of south actress Malashri, Subhashri starred in about thirty feature films in a variety of roles in films such as Gentleman (1993), Chirabandhavya (1993), Muthu (1995), Pokiri Raja (1995), Pedarayudu (1995), and Minor Mappillai (1996). Subhashri was born in Chennai, her mother tongue is Telugu.

== Filmography ==
Year	Title	Role	Language	Notes
1993	Enga Thambi	Indu	Tamil	
1993	Chirabandhavya		Kannada	
1993	Gentleman	Suganthi	Tamil	
1993	Navibbaru Namagibbaru		Kannada	
1994	Andaru Andare		Telugu	
1994	Kanmani		Tamil	
1994	Gandhada Gudi Bhaga 2		Kannada	
1994	Thaatboot Thanjavoor		Tamil	
1994	Gangmaster		Telugu	
1994	Punya Bhoomi Naa Desam		Telugu	
1995	Pokiri Raja	Nikitha	Telugu	
1995	Pedarayudu	Teacher	Telugu	
1995	Alibaba Adbhuta Deepam	Swapna	Telugu	
1995	Muthu	Padmini	Tamil	
1995	Thai Thangai Paasam		Tamil	
1996	Soma		Kannada	
1996	Shreemathi Kalyana		Kannada	
1996	Hitlist	Maya	Malayalam	
1996	Akka Bagunnava		Telugu	Dubbed in Tamil as Aarusamy
1996	Pattanakke Banda Putta		Kannada	
1996	Ooha		Telugu	
1996	Maa Aavida Collector		Telugu	
1996	Hello Neeku Naaku Pellanta		Telugu	
1996	Minor Mappillai		Tamil	
1996	Circle Inspector		Kannada	
1997	Peddannayya	Neelaveni	Telugu	
1997	Allari Pellikoduku		Telugu	
1997	Mavana Magalu		Kannada	
1997	Kurralla Rajyam		Telugu	
1997	Atta.. Nee Koduku Jagratta		Telugu	
1997	Kaliyugamlo Gandaragolam		Telugu	
1997	Bhanda Alla Bahaddur		Kannada	
1997	Kalyani		Kannada	
1998	Allari Pellam		Telugu	
