= S. Sivaraj =

Indian politician

S. Sivaraj is an Indian politician and was a Member of the Legislative Assembly of Tamil Nadu. He was elected to the Tamil Nadu legislative assembly from Rishivandiyam constituency as an Indian National Congress candidate in the 1984 and 2006 elections, and as a Tamil Maanila Congress (Moopanar) candidate in the 1996 and 2001 elections.
