= Ezhai Jaathi =

- Theatrical release poster
- Directed by: Liaquat Ali Khan
- Written by: Liaquat Ali Khan
- Produced by: Hemalatha Ramesh
- Starring: Vijayakanth; Jaya Prada
- Cinematography: Raja Rajan
- Edited by: G. Jayachandran
- Music by: Ilaiyaraaja
- Production company: Chinnipavan Cine Creations
- Release date: 19 February 1993
- Running time: 152 minutes
- Country: India
- Language: Tamil

Ezhai Jaathi (transl. Poor Caste) is a 1993 Indian Tamil-language political action drama film written and directed by Liaquat Ali Khan. The film stars Vijayakanth and Jaya Prada. It was released on 19 February 1993.

== Plot ==
Subhash is the son of Udayar, an influential industrialist who helps pull down one government, and set up another. Subhash is sympathetic to the cause of down-trodden lives in their midst, fighting for their rights. Initially, his father's name is Armour but when his actions—like his clashes with the son of a minister —threaten to bring down the very government which his father supports, latter washes his hands of him, and he is a market man.

The local MLA exploits the innocent people of the slums and gets their votes by using the common caste-factor. Subhash acquaints them of their rights, exposes the politicians for what they are and earns the love and respect of the poor. Thilakavathi, an MP is sympathetic to his cause for which she is held prisoner by her colleagues. However, all ends well with Subhash recovering from a near-fatal wound and the exposed politicians getting their just deserts throughout an irate job.

== Cast ==
- Vijayakanth as Subhash Chandra Bose
- Jaya Prada as Thilakavathi
- Vijayakumar as Udaiyar
- M. N. Nambiar as Iyer
- Manorama as Nagamma
- Mansoor Ali Khan as Rajarathinam's son
- Livingston as Thilakavathi's stepfather
- John Amirtharaj as Rajarathinam
- Senthil as Petha Perumal
- Thyagu as MLA
- LIC Narasimhan as Selection officer
- Krishnamoorthy as Inspector
- Yuvasri as Shankar's Sister
- Murali Kumar as Blind man
- Kokila as Murali kumar's wife
- S. N. Vasanth as Shankar
- Vijay Krishnaraj as Opposition leader
- Dharani as Shanthi
- Prabhu Deva (Special appearance)
- Thalapathy Dinesh (uncredited)
- Vadivelu as Villager (guest appearance)

== Soundtrack ==
The soundtrack was composed by Ilaiyaraaja.

Track listing
| No. | Title | Lyrics | Singers | Length |
|---|---|---|---|---|
| 1. | "Ezhai Jaathi" | Vaali | P. Jayachandran | 5:00 |
| 2. | "Adho Andha Nadhiyoram" | Gangai Amaran | S. Janaki | 5:38 |
| 3. | "Indha Veedu" | Vaali | S. P. Balasubrahmanyam | 5:08 |
| 4. | "Koduthalum" | Vaali | Mano | 4:42 |
| 5. | "Anbe Vaa" | Vaali | Minmini | 7:01 |
| 6. | "Indha Veedu" | Vaali | Ilaiyaraaja | 4:42 |
| Total length: | | | | 32:11 |

== Reception ==
Malini Mannath of The Indian Express wrote, "The dialogue are punchy, and the film, though a little prosaic, is able to hold one's attention". R. P. R. of Kalki wrote that despite grinding the same dough, there was no unnecessary romance, no absurd comedy track; the only thing is length could have been trimmed.
