= Vijayakanth =

Indian actor and politician (1952–2023)

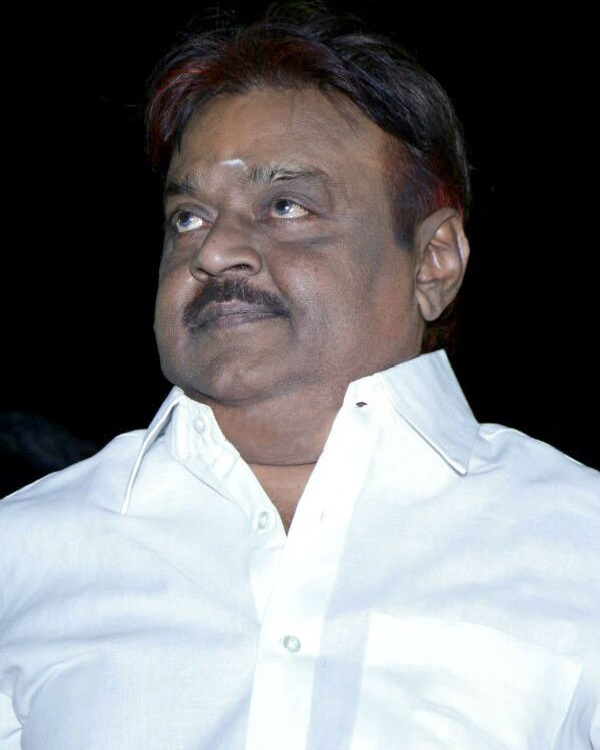
- Vijaykanth in 2015

16th Leader of the Opposition in the Tamil Nadu Legislative Assembly
- In office 27 May 2011 – 21 February 2016
- Chief Minister: J. Jayalalithaa; O. Panneerselvam
- Preceded by: J. Jayalalithaa
- Succeeded by: M. K. Stalin

Member of the Tamil Nadu Legislative Assembly
- In office 23 May 2011 – 21 May 2016
- Preceded by: S. Sivaraj
- Succeeded by: Vasantham K. Karthikeyan
- Constituency: Rishivandiyam
- In office 29 May 2006 – 14 May 2011
- Preceded by: R. Govindasamy
- Succeeded by: V. Muthukumar
- Constituency: Vriddhachalam

President of Desiya Murpokku Dravida Kazhagam
- In office 14 September 2005 – 28 December 2023
- Preceded by: Position established
- Succeeded by: Position abolished

General Secretary of Desiya Murpokku Dravida Kazhagam
- In office 1 June 2014 – 14 December 2023
- Preceded by: S. Ramu Vasanthan
- Succeeded by: Premalatha

President of South Indian Artistes' Association
- In office 2000–2006
- Preceded by: Radha Ravi
- Succeeded by: R. Sarathkumar

Personal details
- Born: Vijayaraj Alagarswami; 25 August 1952 Madurai, Madras State, India
- Died: 28 December 2023 (aged 71) Chennai, Tamil Nadu, India
- Resting place: Koyambedu, Chennai
- Party: Desiya Murpokku Dravida Kazhagam
- Spouse: Premalatha Vijayakanth (m. 1990)
- Children: 2, including Shanmuga Pandian
- Occupation: actor; director; film producer; philanthropist; politician
- Awards: Padma Bhushan (2024) (posthumous); Kalaimamani (2001)
- Nicknames: Captain; Karuppu M.G.R (Black M.G.R); Puratchi Kalaignar (Revolutionary Artist)

Vijayaraj Alagarswami (25 August 1952 – 28 December 2023), known by his stage name Vijayakanth, was an Indian actor, politician, Former 16th Leaders of the opposition in the Tamil Nadu Legislative Assembly. He ventured into politics in the later part of his career, founding the Desiya Murpokku Dravida Kazhagam party.

Vijayakanth acted in over 150 films in his career. Some of his popular films include Vaidehi Kathirunthal (1984), Amman Kovil Kizhakale (1986), Poonthotta Kaavalkaaran (1988), Senthoora Poove (1988), Pulan Visaranai (1990), Chinna Gounder (1992), Honest Raj (1994), Thayagam (1996), Vaanathaippola (2000) and Ramanaa (2002). He was nicknamed "Captain" following his role in the film Captain Prabhakaran (1991). He was also credited as "Puratchi Kalingar" (revolutionary artist) in the film titles as he often appeared in roles as a law enforcer, vigilante, or a village head. He won two Filmfare Awards South, three Tamil Nadu State Film Awards and was awarded the Kalaimamani title in 2001.

Vijayakanth served as the president of the Nadigar Sangam (actors association) from 2000 to 2006. He is credited with bringing the association out of debt and establishing a charitable trust that paid pension to low-income members of the film industry. He was likened to former Tamil Nadu Chief Minister M. G. Ramachandran for his humanitarian work and for his role in supporting impoverished personnel from the Tamil film industry. He accepted deferred remuneration for certain films to help struggling film producers and also preached for food equality on film sets, demanding that all the crew members must be given the same quality meals that he was served.

After founding his own party in 2005, he served as a Member of Legislative Assembly for two terms from 2006 to 2016, representing the constituencies of Virudhachalam and Rishivandiyam respectively. He led his party to win the second-most seats in the 2011 Tamil Nadu Legislative Assembly election and served as the leader of the opposition in the Tamil Nadu Legislative Assembly from 2011 to 2016. He remained as the leader of his party until his death in 2023. In January 2024, he was posthumously awarded India's third-highest civilian honour, the Padma Bhushan, by the Government of India.

== Early and personal life ==
Vijayakanth was born as Vijayaraj Alagarswami in Madurai on 25 August 1952. His parents were K. N. Alagarswami and Aandal. Vijayakanth grew up idolising M. G. Ramachandran and displayed passion towards community and societal issues. During his young age, his father was concerned about Vijayakanth as he showed less interest towards studies and was more interested in cinema. His father ran a rice mill at Keeraithurai where Vijayakanth went on to work and surprised him with his administrative skills.

Vijayakanth married Premalatha on 31 January 1990 and the couple have two sons– Shanmuga Pandian and Vijaya Prabhakaran.

== Film career ==
=== 1978 to 1989: Early career ===
In 1978, Vijayakanth engaged in a photo shoot in Rasi Studios in Madurai with the aim of acting in films, which helped him garner attention. He later gave credit to the chief photographer R. Asaithambi, indicating that the photographs eventually helped him earn a spot in the film industry. Vijayakanth travelled to Chennai to pursue his passion in acting, even though he did not have any cinematic background. He was cast in a supporting role as Rajnikanth's younger brother in En Kelvikku Enna Bathil (1978) by the director P. Madhavan, for which he received an advance of ₹100 (equivalent to ₹3,000 or US$31 in 2026). However, he was later replaced by Ceylon Manohar after the director was unimpressed with Vijayakanth's acting. He claimed to have lost several film opportunities during the early stages of his acting career largely due to his darker complexion. In 1979, Vijayakanth made his first film appearance in M. A. Kaja's Inikkum Ilamai (1979), when he was first credited with his screen name "Vijayakanth". The film was a critical and commercial failure. Though his subsequent films Agal Vilakku (1979), Neerottam (1980) and Samanthipoo (1980) also did not perform well at the box office, his film Doorathu Idi Muzhakkam was screened at the International Film Festival of India. The later film was lauded by viewers and became a turning point in his career.

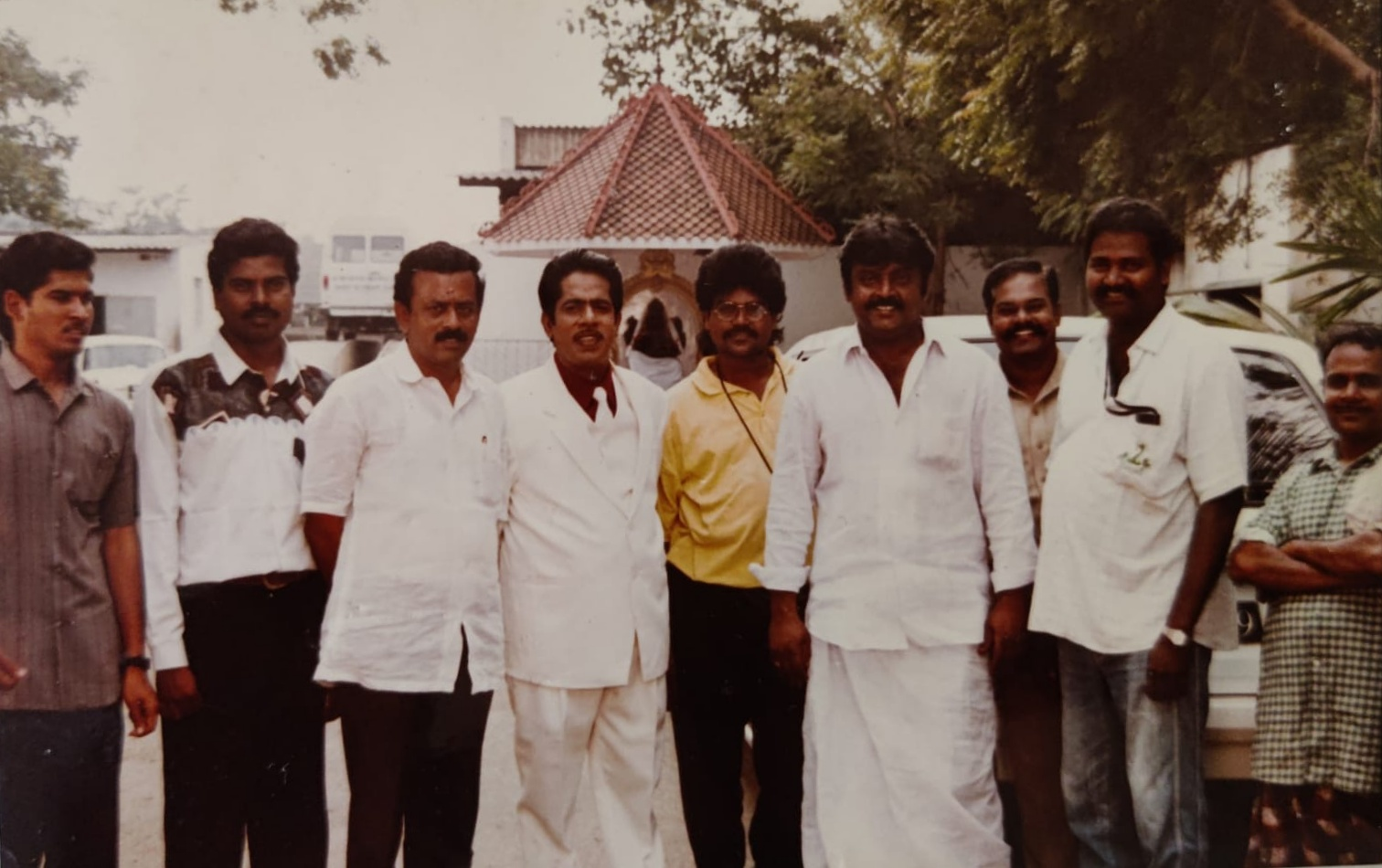
Vijayakanth (third from the right) during his early film career.

In the next few years, Vijayakanth often portrayed the character of an angry young man in films with revolutionary story lines such as Sivappu Malli (1981) and Jadhikkoru Needhi (1981). He became a popular commercial hero after his role in Sattam Oru Iruttarai (1981), directed by S. A. Chandrasekhar, with whom he collaborated in numerous films thereafter. The film became a hit and was remade in several other Indian languages. He played the villain in Om Shakti (1982), which was his last antagonist part in a film. His subsequent commercial films included Dowry Kalyanam (1983), Nooravathu Naal (1984) and Vaidhegi Kaathirunthaal (1984), which became successes. He became lead actor to appear in the most films in 1984. He acted in Annai Bhoomi (1985), the first 3D film made in the Tamil film industry, alongside Radha Ravi and Tiger Prabhakar. He acted in the commercially successful romantic comedy Naane Raja Naane Mandhiri (1985) and co-starred with Vishnuvardhan in Eetti (1985). He went on to act in Amman Kovil Kizhakale (1986), which earned him a Filmfare Award for Best Actor – Tamil; the film ran for 150 days in theatres. In 1986, he appeared in Manakanakku, the only film in which he worked alongside Kamal Haasan.

Vijayakanth's next film was Oomai Vizhigal (1986), which became a cult classic and was lauded as a film way ahead of its time. It portrayed him in a role of an aged cop and made him one of the popular actors of the time alongside Rajinikanth, and Kamal Haasan. In 1987, he co-starred with Sivaji Ganesan in Veerapandiyan, and acted in Ninaive Oru Sangeetham. He was given the epithet "Puratchi Kalaigner" by film's producer Kalaipuli S. Thanu after his performance in Cooliekkaran. On 21 October 1987, Vijayakanth had two theatrical releases as both Uzhavan Magan and Sattam Oru Vilayaattu, both of which were commercially successful. Uzhavan Magan also marked the first collaboration between Vijayakanth and his longtime friend Ibrahim Rowther, who produced the film. In 1988, he worked in films such as Therkathi Kallan, Nallavan and Poonthotta Kaavalkaaran. He won a Tamil Nadu State Film Award for Best Actor for his performance in Senthoora Poove. In 1989, he starred in the commercially successful films Paattukku Oru Thalaivan, and Ponmana Selvan. This was followed by the crime thriller Rajanadai and devotional film Meenakshi Thiruvilayadal.

=== 1990 to 1999: Action roles ===
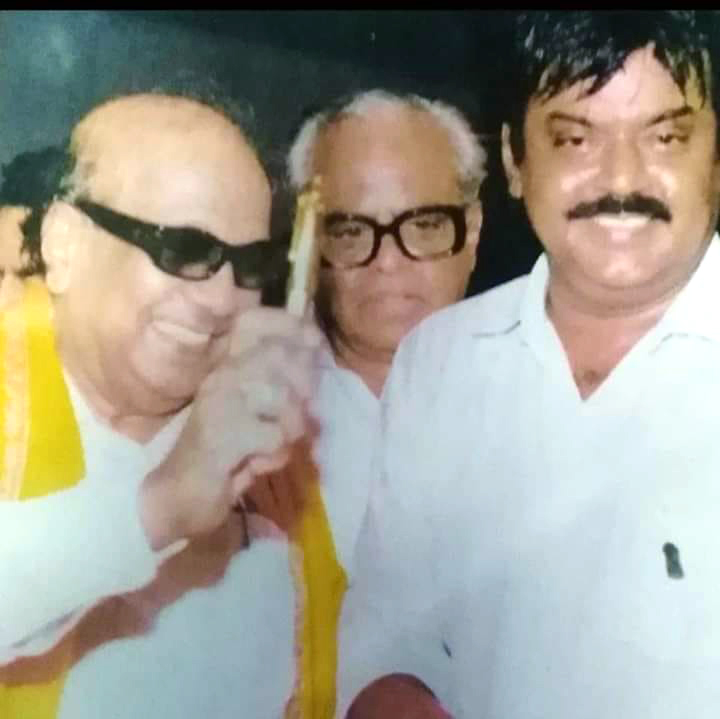
Vijayakanth with then Chief Minister of Tamil Nadu M. Karunanidhi and director K. Balachandar in a function in 1997.

In the 1990s, Vijayakanth established himself as an action icon with a consistent box-office appeal. He was best known for low-budget films that often featured gravity-defying stunts in which he would single-handedly dispatch his enemies. Rowther produced many of his films and played an instrumental role in Vijayakanth's rise as an actor in the early 1990s. He also assisted Vijayakanth in choosing the film scripts. Rowther and Vijayakanth combined for many of the films including Pulan Visaranai (1990), Captain Prabhakaran (1991), Bharathan (1992), Rajadurai (1993), Sakkarai Devan (1993), En Aasai Machan (1994), Gandhi Pirantha Mann (1995), Karuppu Nila (1995), Ulavuthurai (1998), Dharma (1998) and Simmasanam (2000). Pulan Visaranai, which was directed by R. K. Selvamani and featured R. Sarathkumar as the antagonist, became one of the most popular crime thrillers of the time. He later starred as an honest cop in the hit flick Sathriyan, produced by Mani Ratnam. After the success of Pulan Visaranai, he collaborated with Selvamani for Captain Prabhakaran (1991), which was Vijayakanth's 100th film. The film became one of the highest grossing films in 1991 and ran for over 250 days in theatres. He got the sobriquet "captain" after the success of the film.

Vijayakanth acted in the movies Maanagara Kaaval and Moondrezhuthil En Moochirukkum in the same year. In 1992, he appeared in the role of a village chief in the film Chinna Gounder, which turned out to be an experimental film and a cult classic in the later years. The song "Antha Vaanatha Pola" from the movie became popular, and eventually became a popular meme in the later years. He later appeared in films such as Koyil Kaalai (1993), Ezhai Jaathi (1993), Sakkarai Devan (1993), Rajadurai (1993) and Enga Muthalali (1993). He co-starred with Vijay in Senthoorapandi (1993), where he plays the role of elder brother. He played an extended cameo role in this film for which he did not take any remuneration. In 1994, he appeared in Sethupathi IPS, Honest Raj, Pathavi Pramanam, En Aasai Machan and Periya Marudhu. His later films included Karuppu Nila (1995), Thirumoorthy (1995) and Gandhi Pirantha Mann (1995). He won a Tamil Nadu State Film Award Special Prize for his performance in the action film Thayagam (1996). This was followed by Tamizh Selvan and Alexander in 1996. In 1997, he appeared in the film Dharma Chakkaram which was directed by K. S. Ravikumar. He acted in his 125th film Ulavuthurai in 1998, followed by Dharma (1998) and Veeram Vilanja Mannu in the same year. In 1999, he acted in Kallazhagar, and Periyanna, in which he acted alongside Suriya. He later starred in R. B. Choudary's production, Kannupada Poguthaiya.

=== 2000 to 2009: Experienced roles ===
In 2000, Vijayakanth played a dual role in Vaanathai Pola, a rural family drama directed by Vikraman, which won two awards; a Tamil Nadu State Film Award for Best Film of the year and National Film Award for Best Popular Film Providing Wholesome Entertainment. His acting in Vallarasu received widespread attention, in which he played a cop who took on a terrorist group. He played three different roles in his next movie Simmasanam. He acted in action films Vaanchinathan (2001) directed by Shaji Kailas and Narasimha (2001). Though the later failed at the box office, Vijayakanth was praised for his action, and the film became a unique component in Tamil pop culture. Narasimha was considered as a spiritual sequel to Vallarasu. He made a cameo appearance in Viswanathan Ramamoorthy and appeared in a dual role in the village drama Thavasi (2001). His next film Raajjiyam (2002) failed to deliver in the box office and it turned out to be a box office bomb. In 2002, he acted in guest appearance in Devan, directed by Arun Pandian.

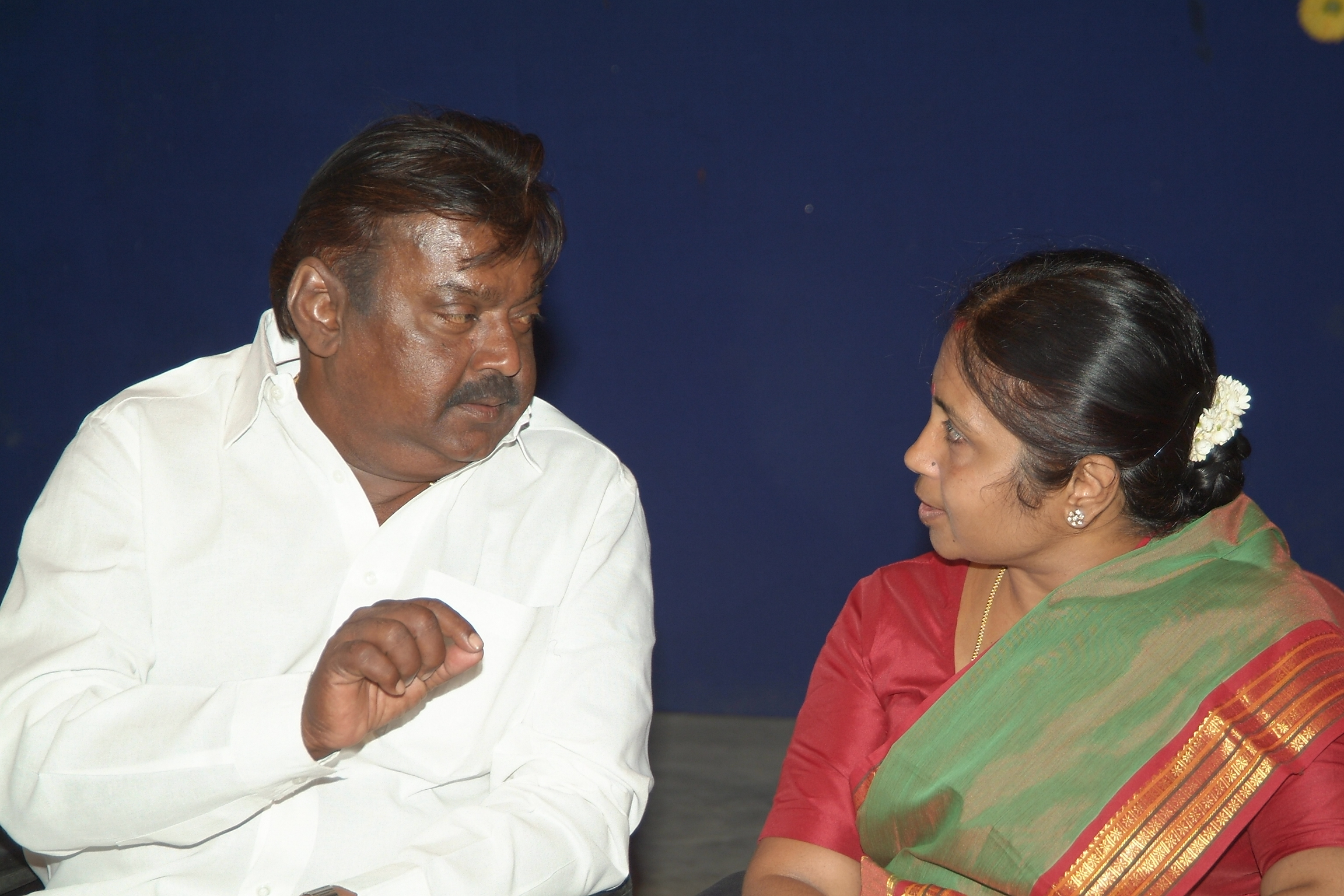
Vijayakanth at a function in 2007.

Vijayakanth collaborated with director AR Murugadoss in Ramanaa, in which he underplayed an action hero and anti-corruption crusader. The film won a Tamil Nadu State Film Award for Best Film of the year and the film became commercially successful. In 2003, he had two releases, Chokka Thangam, a family drama and Thennavan, a political film. In 2004, he appeared in a comedy-drama, Engal Anna which was a commercial success. However, his next films Gajendra and Neranja Manasu, which were released in the same year, received negative reviews. Later, he did a special appearance in Suriya's film Maayavi (2005). In 2006, he acted in three action films, Sudesi, Perarasu and Dharmapuri, all of which failed to deliver at the box office and received negative reviews from critics. The following year, he starred in Sabari (2007) and his 150th film was Arasangam (2008), which was about a police officer who discovers and unravels the mystery behind a terrorist plot. He acted in the drama Mariyadhai (2009), in his second collaboration with director Vikraman, followed by the action film Engal Aasan (2009), in which he co-starred with Vikranth.

=== 2010 to 2015: Later projects ===
In 2010, Vijayakanth acted and directed the film, Virudhagiri, a remake of the French film Taken. After a hiatus of five years, he made a cameo appearance in his son Shanmuga Pandian's first film Sagaptham in 2015. In November 2015, he started acting in Arun Ponnambalam's Thamizhan Endru Sol, alongside his son. The film was later suspended due to Vijayakanth's political commitments and his deteriorating health. In 2022, director Vijay Milton attempted to rope in Vijayakanth in a short role for his film Mazhai Pidikatha Manithan alongside Vijay Antony. The film later went ahead without Vijayakanth due to his health issues. In a film career spanning more than 30 years, he acted in 154 movies.

== Political career ==
On 14 September 2005, Vijayakanth announced the formation of Desiya Murpokku Dravida Kazhagam (DMDK), a regional political party at Madurai. In the 2006 Tamil Nadu state assembly election, only Vijayakanth won, but the party had a 8.4% vote share and registered votes higher than the winning margins of candidates in 63 constituencies. The party contested without an alliance in the 2009 Indian general elections and secured about 10.28% of the votes in Tamil Nadu.

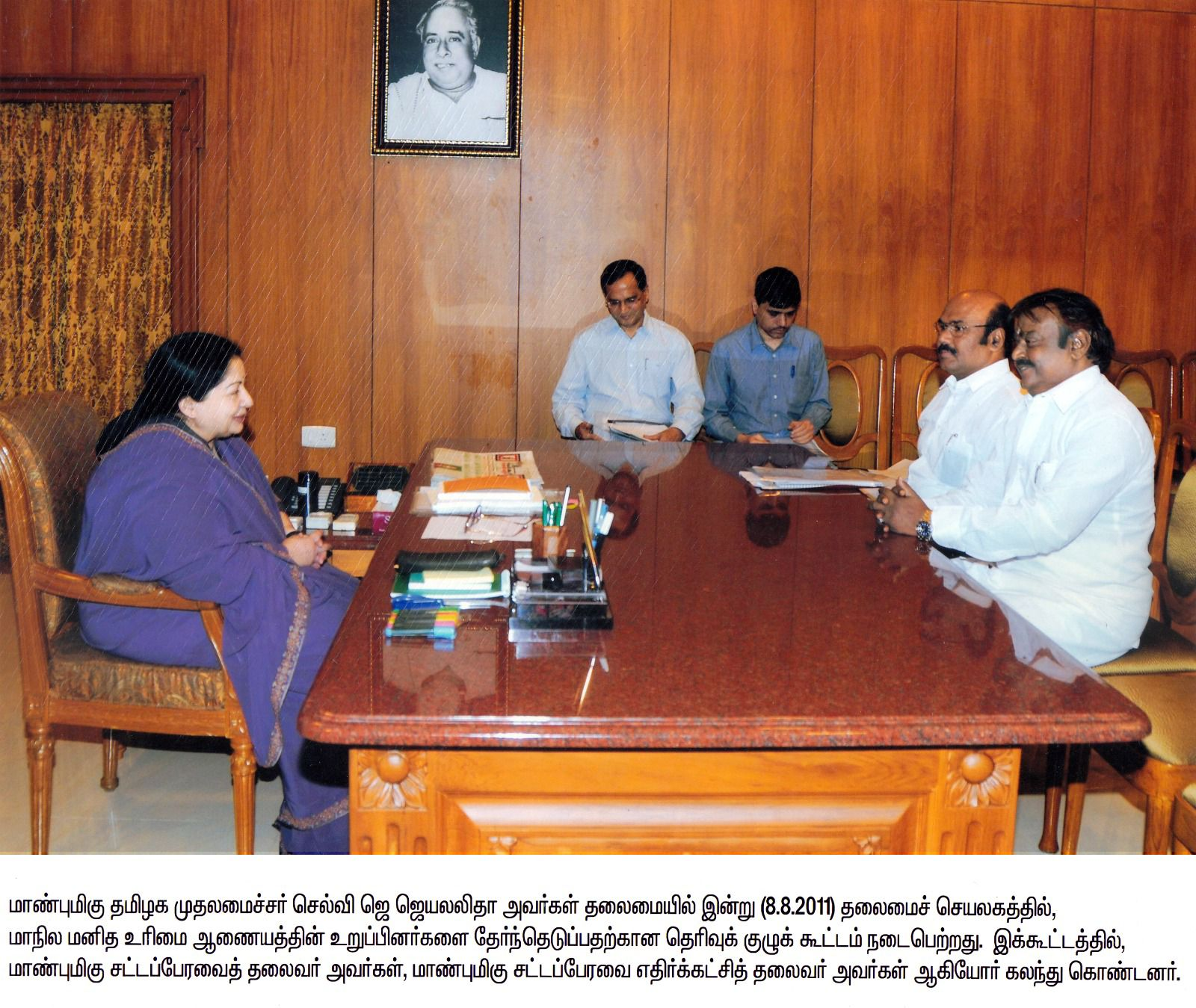
Vijayakanth meeting then chief minister Jayalalithaa in August 2011

In the 2011 Tamil Nadu Legislative Assembly election, the party contested as a part of the AIADMK-led alliance. Vijayakanth led the party's campaign for the elections despite opposition from other party leaders such as S. Ramadoss, the founder of Pattali Makkal Katchi, who expressed his dissatisfaction with people from the film industry entering politics. During the runup to the elections, Vijayakanth developed a feud with actor Vadivelu, Vijayakanth's co-star in a number of his films. This led to attack of Vadivelu's residence by men, whom Vadivelu claimed were from Vijayakanth's party and subsequent legal cases. This was refuted by Vijayakanth. Vadivelu subsequently campaigned against Vijayakanth in the elections.

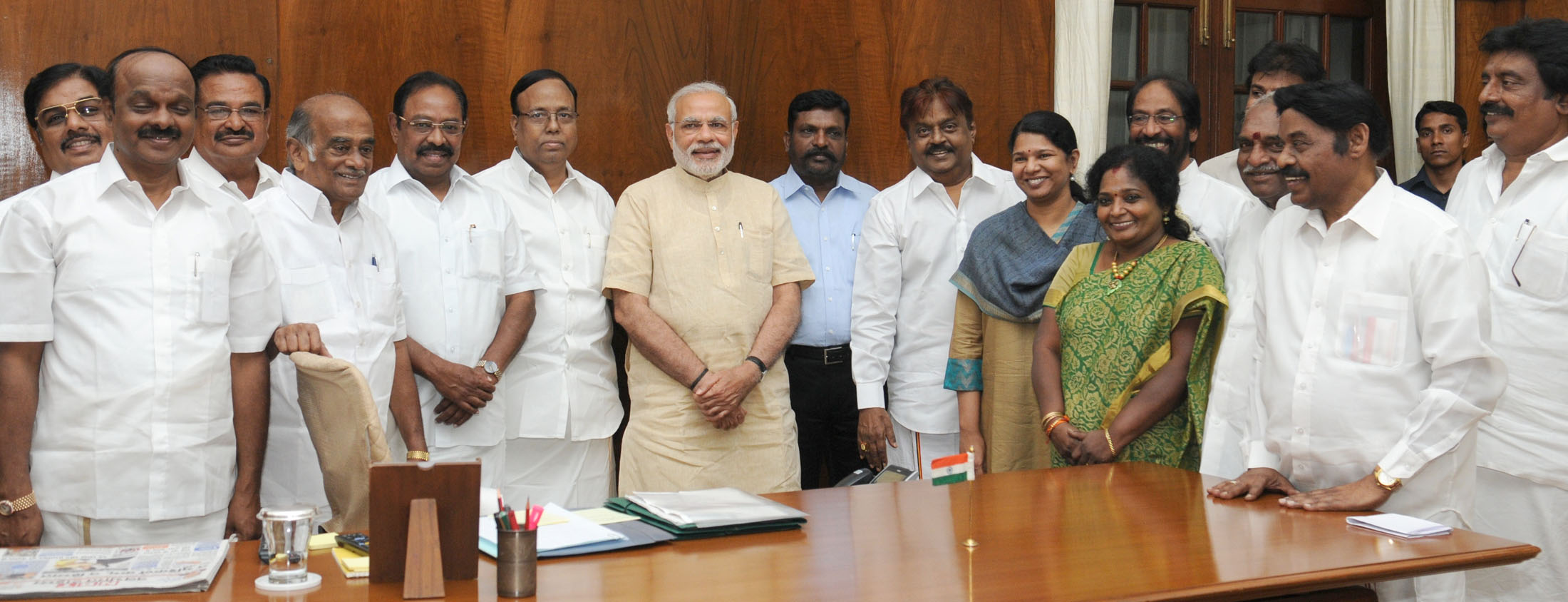
Vijayakanth with his party delegation in a meeting with Prime Minister Narendra Modi in 2015.

DMDK won 29 seats and emerged as the second largest party in the Tamil Nadu Legislative Assembly. Vijayakanth won from Rishivandiyam, after securing 53.2% of the votes polled. Following its performance in the 2011 assembly elections, DMDK was officially recognised as a state party by the Election Commission of India and Vijayakanth was elected as the Leader of Opposition in the Tamil Nadu assembly. Over the next two years, rifts developed between Vijayakanth and then Chief Minister of Tamil Nadu and leader of AIADMK Jayalalithaa, which resulted in separation between the two alliance partners. For the 2014 Indian general elections, Vijayakanth entered into the National Democratic Alliance led by the Bharatiya Janata Party. His party contested 14 seats but did not win a single seat.

In February 2016, Vijayakanth lost his position as the Leader of Opposition in the Tamil Nadu assembly after ten of his party MLAs resigned from the assembly. For the 2016 Tamil Nadu Legislative Assembly elections, he led the People's Welfare Front alliance. During the election campaign, he criticised actor Rajinikanth, which caused backlash from the supporters of Rajinikanth. He was also criticised for making obscene gestures in public, often towards journalists. This led to several memes targeting him in the social media. He lost the election from Ulundurpet to R. Kumaraguru of the AIADMK and his party-led alliance failed to win any seats in the assembly. Despite being part of the winning alliance, his party fared poorly and failed to win any seat in the subsequent 2019 Indian general elections. In the 2021 Tamil Nadu Legislative Assembly election, his party secured just 0.43% of the total votes polled. He continued to serve as the president of DMDK till his death in December 2023.

=== Election results ===
Elections	Assembly	Constituency	Party	Result	Vote percentage	Opposition Candidate	Opposition Party	Opposition vote percentage
2006	13th	Vridhachalam	DMDK	Won	40.49	R. Govindasamy	PMK	31.2
2011	14th	Rishivandiyam	DMDK	Won	53.19	S. Sivaraj	INC	35.22
2016	15th	Ulundurpet	DMDK	Lost	15.14	R. Kumaraguru	AIADMK	36.03

=== Positions held ===
Elections	Position	Elected constituency	Term in office		
Elections	Position	Elected constituency	Assumed	Left	Time in office
2006	Member of Legislative Assembly	Vriddhachalam	17 May 2006	14 May 2011	4 years, 362 days
2011	Leader of the Opposition	Rishivandiyam	27 May 2011	21 February 2016	4 years, 270 days
2011	Member of Legislative Assembly	Rishivandiyam	3 May 2011	21 May 2016	}

== Other work ==
During his film career, Vijayakanth accepted deferred remuneration for certain films to help struggling film producers and also preached for food equality on film sets, demanding that all the crew members must be given the same quality meals that he was served. He was involved in philanthropic work and offered food and meals through his office. He had also assisted several actors by offering consultancy and required financial help. In 2000, Vijayakanth was elected as the president of South Indian Film Artistes' Association and served till 2006. He is credited with bringing the association out of debt. He led the establishment of a charitable trust that paid pension to low-income members of the film industry.

In 2001, Vijayakanth founded Shri Andal Alagar College of Engineering. Vijayakanth launched a television channel Captain TV on 14 April 2010. Vijayakanth later launched a news channel Captain News on 29 August 2012.

== Health decline and death ==
Since the mid-2010s, Vijayakanth’s health issues were noted by the public and media, as his speech slurred and he was unsteady during some political rallies and speeches. In 2017, he remarked that thyroid problems affected his vocal cord. In 2020, he tested positive for COVID-19, after which he had limited public appearance, often sporting a face mask. In 2022, he underwent surgery to amputate three of his toes due to complications from diabetes, which led Vijayakanth to use a wheelchair. In November 2023, he was admitted to hospital. He had tested positive for COVID-19 and was given ventilator support.

On 28 December 2023, Vijayakanth died at the age of 71. His death was condoled by Indian prime minister Narendra Modi, various political leaders, and members of the film industry. The Government of Tamil Nadu announced full state honours for his funeral. His body was kept in state at his residence in Saligramam, later at the Island Grounds for the public to pay their tributes. On the evening of 29 December 2023, his body was taken on a public procession and the last rites were performed. He was buried with state honours in a sandalwood casket in the premises of the headquarters of Desiya Murpokku Dravida Kazhagam in Koyambedu.

== Awards and honours ==
Vijayakanth won two Filmfare Awards South, three Tamil Nadu State Film Awards and was awarded the Kalaimamani title in 2001. In January 2024, he was posthumously awarded India's third-highest civilian honour, the Padma Bhushan, by the Government of India.

Vijayakanth was credited as "Puratchi Kalaignar" (revolutionary artist) and "Captain" in the film titles as he often appeared in roles as a law enforcer, vigilante, or a village head. In 2014, an ex-serviceman lodged a complaint against Vijayakanth at the Madras High Court for using the title "captain", arguing that the term is attached to the Indian Army, is an insult to servicemen and is illegal for common people to use it. He was listed amongst the top 20 best Tamil actors of all time by Cinemaholic in 2022. He was likened to former Tamil Nadu Chief Minister M. G. Ramachandran for his humanitarian work and was often referred to as "Black M.G.R.".
