= List of songs recorded by Vijay =

Songs sung by Vijay

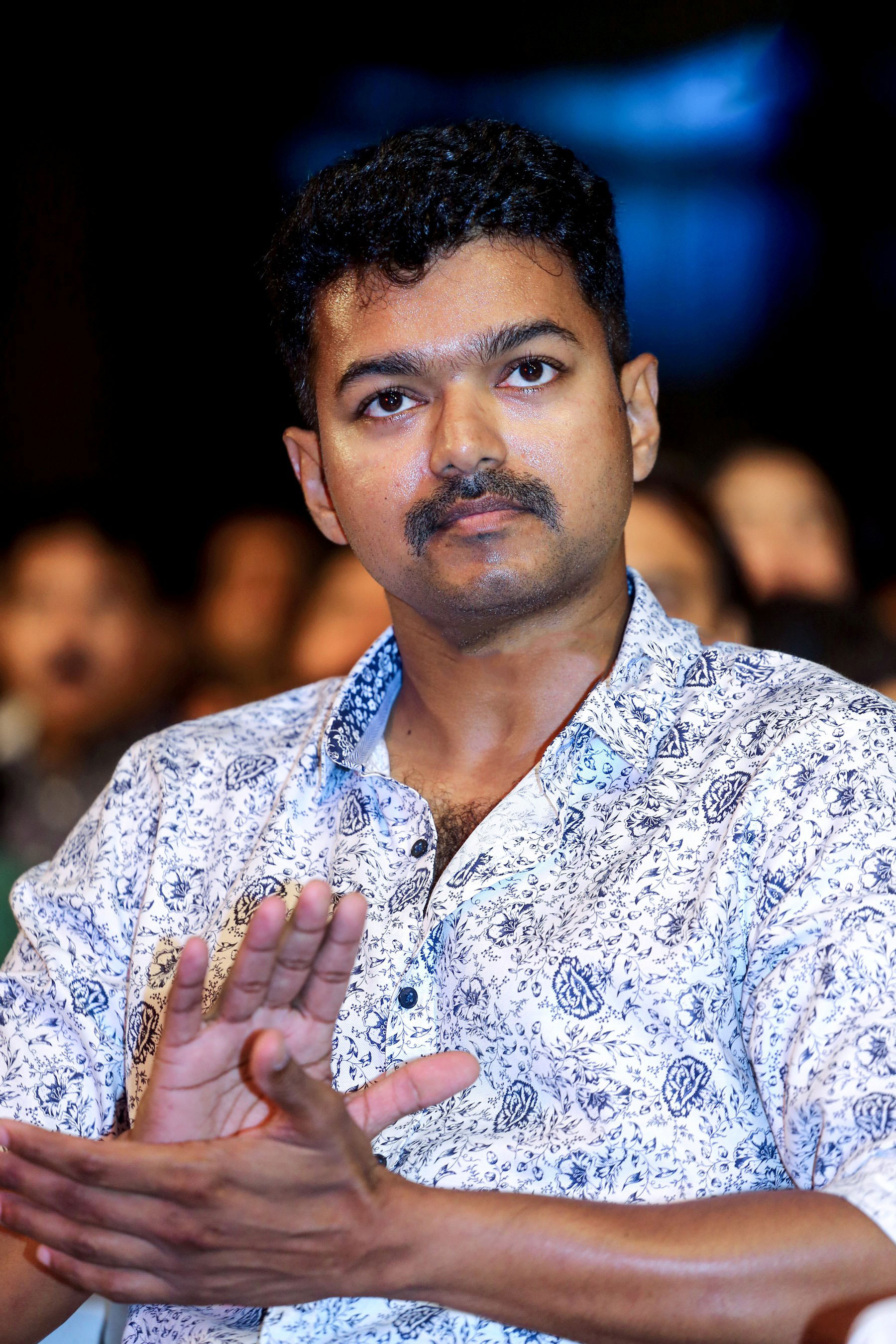
Vijay in 2015

Vijay is an Indian politician, former actor and playback singer who worked in Tamil cinema and is currently serving as 9th chief minister of Tamil Nadu. The son of director S. A. Chandrasekhar, Vijay debuted in the lead role in early 1990s, appearing in Naalaiya Theerpu, directed by his father. He has sung for composers including multiple collaborations with Deva, A. R. Rahman, Ilayaraja, Vidyasagar, Yuvan Shankar Raja, D. Imman, Devi Sri Prasad, G. V. Prakash Kumar, Anirudh Ravichander, and Thaman S. He is one of the most prolific singers among Tamil actors.

Vijay made his debut by singing "Bombay City Sukkha Rotti" composed by Deva (1994) in Rasigan. After his 25th song "Vaadi Vaadi" (2005) in Sachein, Vijay took a sabbatical from singing to concentrate on acting, but made a comeback with "Google Google" in Thuppakki (2012). He won the Favorite Song of The Year at the Vijay Awards for his performance of the song. and a SIIMA Award nomination for Best Playback Singer.

In 2016, Vijay was nominated for a Filmfare Award South in the Best Playback Singer category for "Selfie Pulla". In 2015 he was again nominated for Best Playback Singer, for his performance of "Yaendi Yaendi".

== Songs ==
=== Film songs ===
Year	Song	Film	Composer	Lyricist	Other artist(s)	Notes	Ref.
1994	"Bombay City Sukkha Rotti"	Rasigan	Deva	Vaali	K. S. Chithra		
1995	"Oru Kaditham"	Deva	Deva	Vaali	S. P. Balasubrahmanyam	Spoke dialogues at the beginning of the song	
1995	"Aiyaiyoo Alamelu"	Deva	Deva	Vaali			
1995	"Kothagiri Kuppamma"	Deva	Deva	Vaali	Swarnalatha, Manorama		
1995	"Thottabettaa Rottu Melae"	Vishnu	Deva	Vaali	Shoba Chandrasekhar		
1996	"Bombay Party Shilpa Shetty"	Coimbatore Mappillai	Vidyasagar	Vaali	Shahul Hameed		
1996	"Thiruppathy Ponaa Mottai"	Maanbumigu Maanavan	Deva	Vaali			
1996	"Chicken Kari"	Selva	Sirpy	Vaali	Sirpy, Swarnalatha		
1997	"Anjaam Number Bussil Yeri"	Kaalamellam Kaathiruppen	Deva	R. Sundarrajan			
1997	"Oormilaa Oormilaa"	Once More	Deva	Vairamuthu	Shoba Chandrasekhar		
1997	"Oh Baby Baby"	Kadhalukku Mariyadhai	Ilaiyaraaja	Palani Bharathi	Bhavatharini		
1998	"Mowriya Mowriya"	Priyamudan	Deva	Palani Bharathi	Anuradha Sriram		
1998	"Kaalathuketha Oru Gana"	Velai	Yuvan Shankar Raja	Ravi Bharathi	Nassar, Premgi Amaren		
1998	"Nilave Nilave"	Nilaave Vaa	Vidyasagar	Vairamuthu	Anuradha Sriram		
1998	"Chandira Mandalathai"	Nilaave Vaa	Vidyasagar	Vairamuthu	Harini, S. P. B. Charan		
1999	"Thammadikkira Styla Pathu"	Periyanna	Bharani				
1999	"Juddadi Laila"	Periyanna	Bharani		Swarnalatha		
1999	"Roadula Oru"	Periyanna	Bharani				
1999	"Thanga Nirathuku"	Nenjinile	Deva	A. C. Jairam	Swarnalatha		
2000	"Mississippi Nadhi Kulunga"	Priyamaanavale	S. A. Rajkumar	Vaali	Anuradha Sriram		
2001	"Ennoda Laila"	Badri	Ramana Gogula	Palani Bharathi			
2002	"Ullathai Killadhae"	Thamizhan	D. Imman	Vairamuthu	Priyanka Chopra		
2002	"Coca-Cola (Podango)"	Bagavathi	Srikanth Deva	Kalai Kumar	Vadivelu		
2005	"Vaadi Vaadi"	Sachein	Devi Sri Prasad	V. Elango	Vadivelu		
2012	"Google Google"	Thuppakki	Harris Jeyaraj	Madhan Karky	Andrea Jeremiah, Krishna Iyer, Joe	Vijay Award for Favourite Song; Nominated—SIIMA Award for Best Male Playback Singer	
2013	"Vanganna Vanakkanganna"	Thalaivaa	G. V. Prakash Kumar	Na. Muthukumar	Santhanam		
2014	"Kandangi Kandangi"	Jilla	D. Imman	Vairamuthu	Shreya Ghoshal		
2014	"Selfie Pulla"	Kaththi	Anirudh Ravichander	Madhan Karky	Sunidhi Chauhan	Nominated—Vijay Award for Favourite Song; Nominated—Filmfare Award for Best Male Playback Singer – Tamil	
2014	"Bad Eyes – Villain Theme"	Kaththi	Anirudh Ravichander			His portions were featured in the soundtrack only.	
2015	"Yaendi Yaendi"	Puli	Devi Sri Prasad	Vairamuthu	Shruti Haasan	Nominated—Filmfare Award for Best Male Playback Singer – Tamil	
2016	"Chella Kutti"	Theri	G. V. Prakash Kumar	Kabilan	Neeti Mohan		
2017	"Papa Papa"	Bairavaa	Santhosh Narayanan	Vairamuthu	Priyadarshini		
2019	"Verithanam"	Bigil	A. R. Rahman	Vivek	Sangeetha Sajith, Poovaiyar		
2021	"Kutti Story"	Master	Anirudh Ravichander	Arunraja Kamaraj	Anirudh Ravichander	Nominated—Filmfare Award for Best Male Playback Singer – Tamil	
2022	"Jolly O Gymkhana"	Beast	Anirudh Ravichander	Ku Karthik	Anirudh Ravichander		
2023	"Ranjithame"	Varisu	Thaman S	Vivek	M. M. Manasi		
2023	"Naa Ready"	Leo	Anirudh Ravichander	Vishnu Edavan	Anirudh Ravichander, Asal Kolaar		
2024	"Whistle Podu"	The Greatest of All Time	Yuvan Shankar Raja	Madhan Karky	Yuvan Shankar Raja		
2024	"Whistle Podu Theatrical"	The Greatest of All Time	Yuvan Shankar Raja	Madhan Karky	Yuvan Shankar Raja, Premgi Amaren, Venkat Prabhu		
2024	"Chinna Chinna Kangal"	The Greatest of All Time	Yuvan Shankar Raja	Kabilan Vairamuthu	Bhavatharini		
2026	"Thalapathy Kacheri"	Jana Nayagan	Anirudh Ravichander	Arivu	Anirudh Ravichander, Arivu		
2026	"Chella Magale"	Jana Nayagan	Anirudh Ravichander	Vivek			

=== Non-film songs ===
Year	Song	Composer	Lyricist	Notes	Ref.
2025	"Unga Vijay Na Varen"	S. Thaman	Vivek		
2026	"TVK Election Campaign Song"	S. Thaman	Vivek		

== See also ==
- Vijay filmography
- List of awards and nominations received by Vijay
