= Vijay filmography =

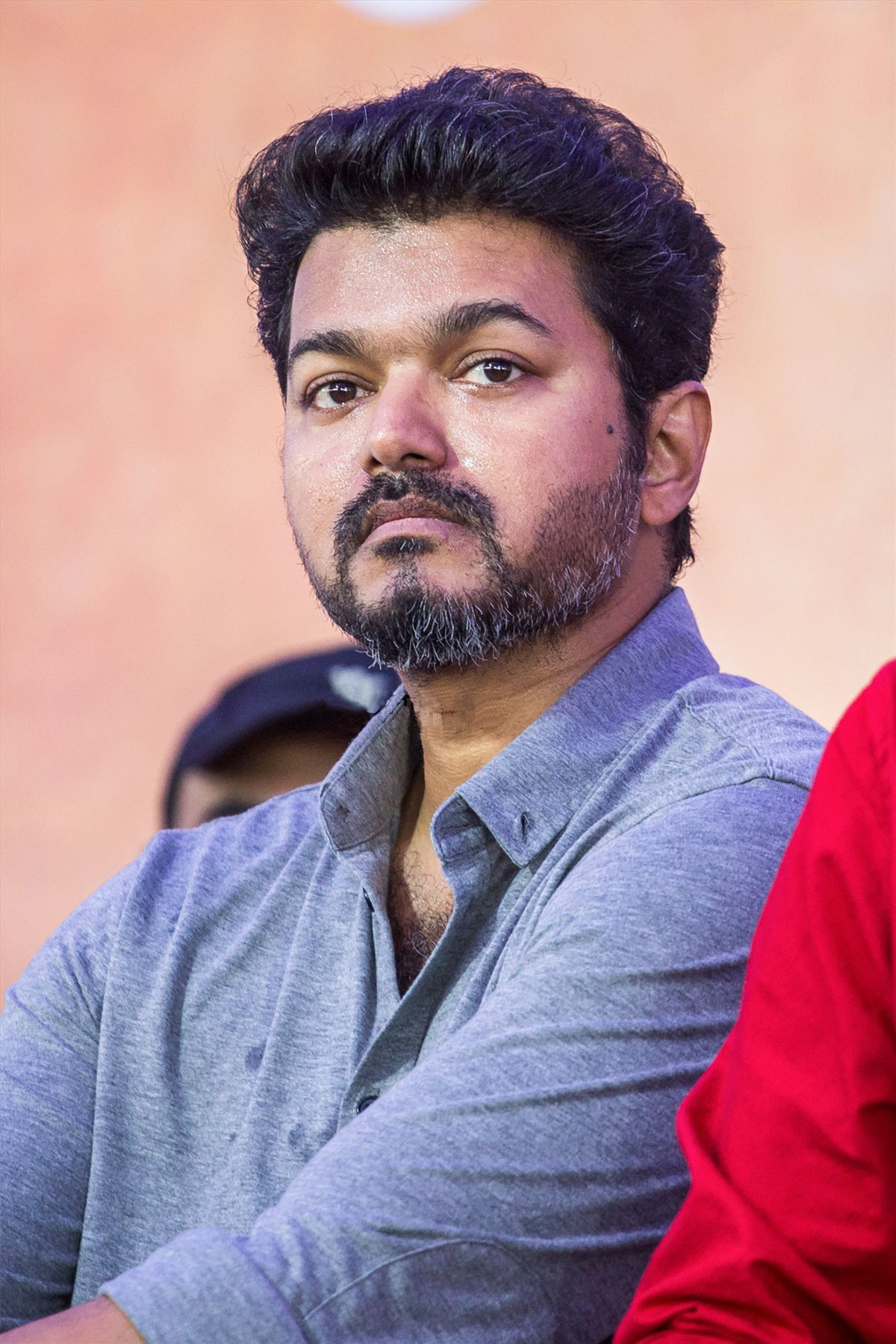
Vijay in 2018 at the Nadigar Sangam Protest

Vijay is an Indian actor, playback singer, and politician who works in Tamil cinema and who is currently the chief minister of Tamil Nadu. He made his cinematic debut in 1984 with Vetri, directed by his father, S. A. Chandrasekhar. After appearing in Chandrasekhar's films as a child artist, Vijay made his debut as a lead actor with Naalaiya Theerpu (1992) at the age of 18. He followed it with a role opposite Vijayakanth in Senthoorapandi (1993). Vijay went on to play lead roles in his father's directorial ventures such as Rasigan (1994), Deva (1995) and Vishnu (1995). Most of those films were successful commercially.

Vijay's first commercial blockbuster was the rom-com Coimbatore Mappillai in 1996, followed by his breakthrough blockbuster romance film, Poove Unakkaga. His subsequent films, Love Today (1997) and Kadhalukku Mariyadhai (1997), were critically and commercially successful. His performance in the latter won him the Tamil Nadu State Film Award for Best Actor. Thullatha Manamum Thullum (1999), where he played a passionate singer gained him the reputation of a romantic hero.

Vijay began the new millennium with critically and commercially successful films such as Kushi and Priyamaanavale. The following year, he appeared in three films: Friends, Badri and Shahjahan. All three were box office successes. Many of his subsequent films were successful including Thamizhan, Youth, Bagavathi (all three released in 2002), and Vaseegara (2003). The success of his masala film Thirumalai (2003), changed his on-screen persona to that of an action hero. He appeared next as a kabaddi player in Ghilli (2004), which went on to become the most commercially successful Tamil film of the year. His performance as a sword-smith in the masala film Thirupaachi (2005) earned him a special prize at the Tamil Nadu State Film Awards. He continued to achieve commercial success with Sivakasi (2005) and Pokkiri (2007). Barring Vettaikaaran and Kuruvi's box office successes, his subsequent releases Azhagiya Tamil Magan (2007), where he played dual roles for the first time in his career, and Villu (2009) were average successes; his 50th film, Sura (2010), managed to recover only its production cost.

In 2011, Vijay's career prospects improved after he was praised for his role as a bodyguard in Kaavalan, which had a 100-day theatrical run and was a box office hit. Velayudham in which he appeared as a masked superhero, was commercially successful worldwide. The following year he appeared in two films: as a college student in Nanban and an army officer in Thuppakki. His performances in both films received positive critical feedback. He followed that with Thalaivaa (2013) and the multi-starrer Jilla (2014) which was commercially successful. He teamed up with Murugadoss again for the action film Kaththi (2014). The film, which had Vijay playing dual roles as a thief and an idealist, became one of the highest-grossing Tamil films of that year; his performances earned him critics praise. In his next film, fantasy Puli (2015), he featured again in dual roles; it underperformed at the box office. The following year, he played a police officer in Atlee's Theri and has gained positive response from the audience. The film had one of the biggest openings in Tamil cinema and was a major commercial success. Vijay's performance won him South Indian International Movie Awards. He played triple roles for the first time in Mersal (2017). In addition to garnering a UK Award for Best Actor, the film became a box office success. Vijay earned critical acclaim for Sarkar (2018). He also starred in films Bigil (2019), Master (2021), Beast (2022), Varisu, Leo (both 2023) and he played dual roles again in the film The Greatest of All Time (2024), all of which garnered mixed reviews but were commercially successful in the box office, with Leo becoming the highest-grossing film of his career. As Vijay shifted his focus to his political career, he announced his retirement from cinema, with Jana Nayagan becoming his last film.

== Film ==
Key
†	Denotes films that have not yet been released

- All films are in Tamil, unless otherwise noted.

List of Vijay film credits
Year	Title	Role(s)	Notes	Ref.
1984	Vetri	Vijay	Child actor	
1984	Kudumbam	Narada	Child actor	
1985	Naan Sigappu Manithan	Unnamed	Child actor	
1986	Vasantha Raagam	Vijay	Child actor	
1987	Sattam Oru Vilayattu	Raja	Child actor	
1988	Ithu Engal Neethi	Vijay	Child actor	
1992	Naalaiya Theerpu	Vijay	First film as lead actor	
1993	Senthoorapandi	Vijay		
1994	Rasigan	Vijay		
1995	Deva	Deva		
1995	Rajavin Parvaiyile	Raja		
1995	Vishnu	Vishnu (Krishna) (Note: Vijay played a single character with two or more names)		
1995	Chandralekha	Rahim Rowther		
1996	Coimbatore Mappillai	Balu		
1996	Poove Unakkaga	Raja		
1996	Vasantha Vaasal	Vijay		
1996	Maanbumigu Maanavan	Sivaraj		
1996	Selvaa	Selvan		
1997	Kaalamellam Kaathiruppen	Kannan		
1997	Love Today	Ganesh		
1997	Once More	Vijay		
1997	Nerrukku Ner	Vijay		
1997	Kadhalukku Mariyadhai	Jeevanandham (Jeeva)		
1998	Ninaithen Vandhai	Gokulakrishnan		
1998	Priyamudan	Vasanth		
1998	Nilaave Vaa	Siluvai		
1999	Thullatha Manamum Thullum	Kutty		
1999	Endrendrum Kadhal	Vijay		
1999	Nenjinile	Karunakaran (Karna)		
1999	Minsara Kanna	Kannan (Kasi)		
2000	Kannukkul Nilavu	Gautham Prabhakar	25th film	
2000	Kushi	Shiva		
2000	Priyamaanavale	Vijay Vishwanathan		
2001	Friends	Aravindhan		
2001	Badri	Sri Badrinatha Moorthy (Badri)		
2001	Shahjahan	Ashok		
2002	Thamizhan	C. J. Surya		
2002	Youth	Shiva		
2002	Bagavathi	Bhagavathi		
2003	Vaseegara	Boopathi		
2003	Pudhiya Geethai	Sarathy		
2003	Thirumalai	Thirumalai		
2004	Udhaya	Udhayakumaran (Udhaya)		
2004	Ghilli	Saravanavelu Sivasubramaniam (Velu, Ghilli)		
2004	Madhurey	Maduravel (Madhurey)		
2005	Thirupaachi	Sivagiri (Giri)		
2005	Sukran	Sukran	Extended cameo	
2005	Sachein	Sachein		
2005	Sivakasi	Muthappa (Sivakasi)		
2006	Aathi	Aathikesavan		
2007	Pokkiri	Sathyamoorthy (Thamizh)		
2007	Azhagiya Tamil Magan	Gurumoorthy (Guru), Prasad (Note: Vijay played two characters)		
2008	Kuruvi	Vetrivel Singamuthu (Velu, Kuruvi)		
2008	Pandhayam	Himself	Guest appearance	
2009	Villu	Pugazh, Saravanan		
2009	Vettaikaaran	"Police" Ravi		
2010	Sura	Sura	50th film	
2011	Kaavalan	Bhoominathan		
2011	Velayudham	Velu (Velayudham)		
2012	Nanban	Kosaksi Pasapugazh (Panchavan Parivendan)		
2012	Rowdy Rathore	Himself	Hindi film; Guest appearance in the song "Chinta Ta"	
2012	Thuppakki	Jagadish Dhanapal		
2013	Thalaivaa	Vishwa Ramadorai (Vishwa Bhai)		
2014	Jilla	DCP Shakthi Aarumugam		
2014	Kaththi	Kathiresan (Kathir), Jeevanandham (Jeeva)		
2015	Puli	Marudheeran, Pulivendhan		
2016	Theri	A. Vijay Kumar (Joseph Kuruvilla, Dharmeshwar)		
2017	Bairavaa	Bairavaa		
2017	Mersal	Vetri, Maaran, Vetrimaaran (Note: Vijay played three characters)		
2018	Sarkar	Sundar Ramasamy		
2019	Bigil	Michael Rayappan (Bigil), Rayappan		
2021	Master	John Durairaj (JD)		
2022	Beast	Veera Raghavan		
2023	Varisu	Vijay Rajendran		
2023	Leo	Parthiban / Leo Das		
2024	The Greatest of All Time	M.S. Gandhi, Jeevan Gandhi (Sanjay Menon), Cloning Jeevan 01, Cloning Jeevan 02, Cloning Jeevan 03 (Note: Vijay played five characters)		
2026	Jana Nayagan	Thalapathy Vetri Kondan	Final film	

== See also ==
- List of awards and nominations received by Vijay
- List of songs sung by Vijay
