= List of accolades received by Thuppakki =

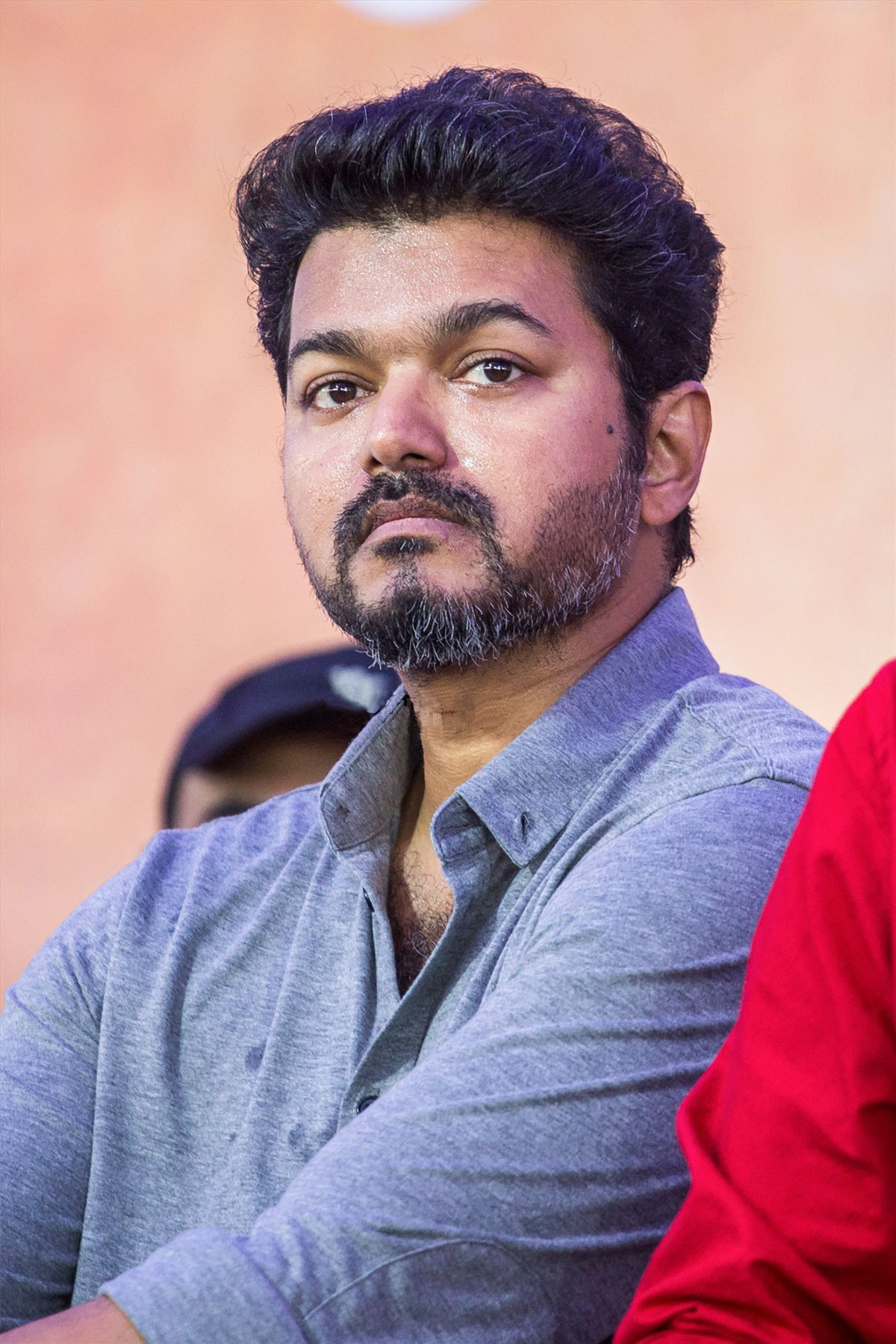
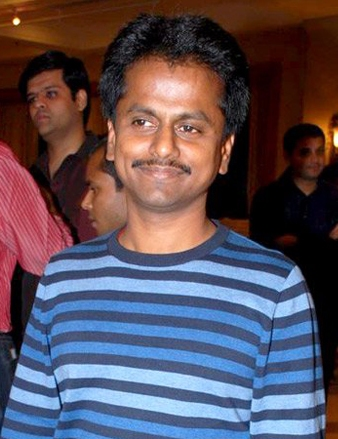
- Vijay and AR Murugadoss received several awards and nominations for their performance, script and direction, respectively.
Accolades
Award	Won	Nominated
Ananda Vikatan Cinema Awards	1	1
Chennai Times Film Awards	1	5
CineMAA Awards	1	1
Edison Awards	3	12
Filmfare Awards South	0	7
South Indian International Movie Awards	4	10
Vijay Awards	6	16
- Total number of awards and nominations (Note: Awards in certain categories do not have prior nominations and only winners are announced by the jury. For simplification and to avoid errors, each award in this list has been presumed to have had a prior nomination.)
Totals	19	57

Thuppakki (transl. Gun) is a 2012 Indian Tamil-language action thriller film written and directed by AR Murugadoss. Produced by Kalaipuli S. Thanu under his studio V Creations and distributed by Gemini Film Circuit, the film stars Vijay and Kajal Aggarwal, with Sathyan, Vidyut Jammwal and Jayaram in supporting roles. The film's music was composed by Harris Jayaraj with cinematography handled by Santosh Sivan and editing done by A. Sreekar Prasad. It revolves around Jagadish Dhanapal (Vijay) an Indian Army officer on a mission to track down, destroy and deactivate a sleeper cell, after witnessing and barely escaping a bomb blast executed by the cell.

Produced on a budget of ₹700 million (equivalent to ₹1.3 billion or US$14 million in 2023), Thuppakki released on 13 November 2012 to positive reviews from critics and was commercially successful, grossing over ₹1.8 billion (equivalent to ₹3.4 billion or US$35 million in 2023). S. Saraswathi of Rediff stated that it was the first Tamil film to cross ₹1 billion (US$10 million) mark. Furthermore, the film won 19 awards from 57 nominations, mostly for the performances, soundtrack, score, cinematography, scripting, direction and other major technical aspects.

At the 60th Filmfare Awards South, Thuppakki received seven nominations in the Tamil branch, including Best Film, Best Director (Murugadoss) and Best Actor (Vijay), but did not win in any category. It received ten nominations at the 2nd South Indian International Movie Awards and won four: Best Actress – Critics (Aggarwal), Best Actor in a Negative Role (Jammwal), Best Music Director (Harris Jayaraj) and Best Fight Choreographer Kaecha Kampakdee. The film received 16 nominations at the 7th Vijay Awards and won 6 awards; the highest in the award ceremony – with five from the favourite awards branch and an Entertainer of the Year award for Vijay. Among other wins, the film received a Chennai Times Film Award for Best Film, an Ananda Vikatan Cinema Award for Best Actor (Vijay), CineMAA Award for Aggarwal and three Edison Awards.

== Accolades ==
Award (Note: Awards, festivals and organisations are in alphabetical order.)	Date of ceremony (Note: Date is linked to the article about the awards held that year, wherever possible.)	Category	Nominee(s)	Result	Ref.
Ananda Vikatan Cinema Awards	16 January 2013	Best Actor	Vijay (Note: also for Nanban)	Won	
Chennai Times Film Awards	4 November 2013	Best Film	Thuppakki	Won	
Chennai Times Film Awards	4 November 2013	Best Director	AR Murugadoss	Nominated	
Chennai Times Film Awards	4 November 2013	Best Actor	Vijay	Nominated	
Chennai Times Film Awards	4 November 2013	Best Actor in a Negative Role	Vidyut Jammwal	Nominated	
Chennai Times Film Awards	4 November 2013	Best Screenplay	AR Murugadoss	Nominated	
CineMAA Awards	16 June 2013	Best Actress — Tamil	Kajal Aggarwal	Won	
Edison Awards	10 February 2013	Best Director	AR Murugadoss	Nominated	
Edison Awards	10 February 2013	Best Actor	Vijay	Nominated	
Edison Awards	10 February 2013	Best Music Director	Harris Jayaraj	Nominated	
Edison Awards	10 February 2013	Best Cinematographer	Santosh Sivan	Nominated	
Edison Awards	10 February 2013	Best Editor	A. Sreekar Prasad	Won	
Edison Awards	10 February 2013	Best Producer	Kalaipuli S. Thanu	Won	
Edison Awards	10 February 2013	Best Villain	Vidyut Jammwal	Nominated	
Edison Awards	10 February 2013	Best Lyricist	Madhan Karky for "Google Google"	Won	
Edison Awards	10 February 2013	Best Screenplay	AR Murugadoss	Nominated	
Edison Awards	10 February 2013	Best Choreographer	Shobi Paulraj for "Antartica"	Nominated	
Edison Awards	10 February 2013	Best Female Playback Singer	Andrea Jeremiah for "Google Google"	Nominated	
Edison Awards	10 February 2013	Best Character Role – Female	Deepthi	Nominated	
Filmfare Awards South	20 July 2013	Best Film – Tamil	Kalaipuli S. Thanu	Nominated	
Filmfare Awards South	20 July 2013	Best Director – Tamil	AR Murugadoss	Nominated	
Filmfare Awards South	20 July 2013	Best Actor – Tamil	Vijay	Nominated	
Filmfare Awards South	20 July 2013	Best Supporting Actor – Tamil	Vidyut Jammwal	Nominated	
Filmfare Awards South	20 July 2013	Best Music Director – Tamil	Harris Jayaraj	Nominated	
Filmfare Awards South	20 July 2013	Best Lyricist – Tamil	Madhan Karky for "Google Google"	Nominated	
Filmfare Awards South	20 July 2013	Best Female Playback Singer – Tamil	Andrea Jeremiah for "Google Google"	Nominated	
South Indian International Movie Awards	12–13 September 2013	Best Film	Kalaipuli S. Thanu	Nominated	
South Indian International Movie Awards	12–13 September 2013	Best Director	AR Murugadoss	Nominated	
South Indian International Movie Awards	12–13 September 2013	Best Actor	Vijay	Nominated	
South Indian International Movie Awards	12–13 September 2013	Best Actress (Critics)	Kajal Aggarwal	Won	
South Indian International Movie Awards	12–13 September 2013	Best Actor in a Negative Role	Vidyut Jammwal	Won	
South Indian International Movie Awards	12–13 September 2013	Best Comedian	Jayaram	Nominated	
South Indian International Movie Awards	12–13 September 2013	Best Male Playback Singer	Vijay for "Google Google"	Nominated	
South Indian International Movie Awards	12–13 September 2013	Best Music Director	Harris Jayaraj	Won	
South Indian International Movie Awards	12–13 September 2013	Best Dance Choreographer	Shobi Paulraj	Nominated	
South Indian International Movie Awards	12–13 September 2013	Best Fight Choreographer	Kaecha Kampakdee	Won	
Vijay Awards	11 May 2013	Entertainer of the Year	Vijay	Won	
Vijay Awards	11 May 2013	Favourite Film	Thuppakki	Won	
Vijay Awards	11 May 2013	Favourite Director	AR Murugadoss	Won	
Vijay Awards	11 May 2013	Favourite Hero	Vijay	Won	
Vijay Awards	11 May 2013	Favourite Heroine	Kajal Aggarwal	Won	
Vijay Awards	11 May 2013	Favourite Song	Harris Jayaraj for "Google Google"	Won	
Vijay Awards	11 May 2013	Best Film	Thuppakki	Nominated	
Vijay Awards	11 May 2013	Best Director	AR Murugadoss	Nominated	
Vijay Awards	11 May 2013	Best Actor	Vijay	Nominated	
Vijay Awards	11 May 2013	Best Actress	Kajal Aggarwal	Nominated	
Vijay Awards	11 May 2013	Best Villain	Vidyut Jammwal	Nominated	
Vijay Awards	11 May 2013	Best Editor	A. Sreekar Prasad	Nominated	
Vijay Awards	11 May 2013	Best Art Director	Sunil Babu	Nominated	
Vijay Awards	11 May 2013	Best Choreographer	Shobi Paulraj for "Antartica"	Nominated	
Vijay Awards	11 May 2013	Best Choreographer	Sridhar for "Alaikka Laikka"	Nominated	
Vijay Awards	11 May 2013	Best Stunt Director	Kaecha Kampakdee	Nominated	

== See also ==
- List of Tamil films of 2012
