= List of awards and nominations received by Vijay =

Vijay awards and nominations
- Vijay in 2013
Awards and nominations
Award	Wins	Nominations
Honours	1	1
Ananda Vikatan Cinema Awards	2	2
Asianet Film Awards	1	1
Dinakaran Awards	1	1
Edison Awards	4	7
Kumudam Awards	1	1
Mathrubhumi Film Awards	1	1
National Film Awards UK	0	1
Osaka Asian Film Festival	1	1
South Indian International Movie Awards	1	9
Tamil Nadu State Film Awards	3	3
Vijay Awards	9	18
Zee Cine Awards Tamil	1	1
International Achievement Recognition Award (IARA)	1	1

Totals (Note: Certain award groups do not simply award one winner. They acknowledge several different recipients, have runners-up, and have third place. Since this is a specific recognition and is different from losing an award, runner-up mentions are considered wins in this award tally. For simplification and to avoid errors, each award in this list has been presumed to have had a prior nomination.)
- Wins: 30
- Nominations: 58

C. Joseph Vijay is a former Indian actor and singer who worked in Tamil cinema.

== Awards and nominations ==
Name of the award ceremony, year presented, nominee(s) of the award, award category, and the result of the nomination
Award ceremony	Year (Note: Indicates the year of ceremony. Each year is linked to the article about the awards held that year, wherever possible.)	Category	Work	Result	Ref.
Ananda Vikatan Cinema Awards	2012	Best Actor	Nanban/Thuppakki	Won	
Ananda Vikatan Cinema Awards	2018	Best Actor	Mersal	Won	
Asianet Film Awards	2010	Most Popular Tamil Actor	–	Won	
Cosmopolitan Awards	2012	Best Actor	Nanban/Thuppakki	Won	
Dinakaran Awards	2005	Best Actor	Ghilli	Won	
Edison Awards	2011	Best Actor	Velayudham	Won	
Edison Awards	2011	Super Star Award	Velayudham	Won	
Edison Awards	2012	Best Actor	Thuppakki	Nominated	
Edison Awards	2014	Best Actor	Kaththi	Nominated	
Edison Awards	2015	Best Actor	Puli	Nominated	
Edison Awards	2016	Best Actor	Theri	Won	
Edison Awards	2017	Best Actor	Mersal	Won	
Filmfare Awards South	2005	Best Actor – Tamil	Ghilli	Nominated	
Filmfare Awards South	2008	Best Actor – Tamil	Pokkiri	Nominated	
Filmfare Awards South	2013	Best Actor – Tamil	Thuppakki	Nominated	
Filmfare Awards South	2015	Best Actor – Tamil	Kaththi	Nominated	
Filmfare Awards South	2015	Best Male Playback Singer – Tamil	"Selfie Pulla" (from Kaththi)	Nominated	
Filmfare Awards South	2017	Best Actor – Tamil	Theri	Nominated	
Filmfare Awards South	2018	Best Actor – Tamil	Mersal	Nominated	
Filmfare Awards South	2019	Best Actor – Tamil	Sarkar	Nominated	
Isaiaruvi TV Awards	2007	Best Actor	Pokkiri	Won	
Isaiaruvi TV Awards	2009	Favourite Hero	Vettaikaran	Won	
Kumudam Awards	2014	People Choice Superstar Award	–	Won	
Mathrubhumi Film Awards	2007	Best Tamil Actor	Pokkiri	Won	
National Film Awards UK	2018	Best Actor	Mersal	Nominated	
Osaka Tamil International Film Festival	2023	Best Actor	Master	Won	
South Indian International Movie Awards	2013	Best Actor – Tamil	Thuppakki	Nominated	
South Indian International Movie Awards	2013	Best Male Playback Singer – Tamil	"Google Google" (from Thuppakki)	Nominated	
South Indian International Movie Awards	2015	Best Actor – Tamil	Kaththi	Nominated	
South Indian International Movie Awards	2017	Entertainer of the year	Theri	Won	
South Indian International Movie Awards	2017	Best Actor – Tamil	Theri	Nominated	
South Indian International Movie Awards	2018	Best Actor – Tamil	Mersal	Nominated	
South Indian International Movie Awards	2021	Best Actor – Tamil	Bigil	Nominated	
South Indian International Movie Awards	2022	Best Actor – Tamil	Master	Nominated	
South Indian International Movie Awards	2024	Best Actor – Tamil	Leo	Nominated	
Tamil Nadu State Film Awards	1997	Best Actor	Kadhalukku Mariyadhai	Won	
Tamil Nadu State Film Awards	2000	MGR Award	Thulladha Manamum Thullum	Won	
Tamil Nadu State Film Awards	2005	Special Prize	Thirupaachi	Won	
Vijay Awards	2007	Superstar of Tomorrow	–	Won	
Vijay Awards	2008	Entertainer of the Year	Pokkiri / Azhagiya Tamil Magan	Won	
Vijay Awards	2008	Favourite Hero	Pokkiri	Nominated	
Vijay Awards	2009	Favourite Hero	Kuruvi	Nominated	
Vijay Awards	2010	Favourite Hero	Vettaikaaran	Won	
Vijay Awards	2011	Favourite Hero	Sura	Nominated	
Vijay Awards	2012	Favourite Hero	Velayudham	Nominated	
Vijay Awards	2013	Entertainer of the Year	Nanban / Thuppakki	Won	
Vijay Awards	2013	Favourite Hero	Thuppakki	Won	
Vijay Awards	2013	Favourite Song	Thuppakki	Won	
Vijay Awards	2013	Best Actor	Thuppakki	Nominated	
Vijay Awards	2014	Favourite Hero	Thalaivaa	Won	
Vijay Awards	2015	Entertainer of the Year	Jilla / Kaththi	Won	
Vijay Awards	2015	Favourite Hero	Kaththi	Nominated	
Vijay Awards	2015	Favourite Song	Kaththi	Nominated	
Vijay Awards	2015	Best Actor	Kaththi	Nominated	
Vijay Awards	2018	Favourite Hero	Mersal	Won	
Vijay Awards	2018	Best Actor	Mersal	Nominated	
Zee Cine Awards Tamil	2020	Favourite Hero	Bigil	Won	
International Achievement Recognition Awards (IARA)	2018	Best International Actor	Mersal	Won	[1]
