= Gemini Film Circuit =

Indian film production company

- Type: Film distribution, production
- Headquarters: Chennai, India
- Key people: Akkineni Manohar Prasad; Akkineni Anand Prasad
- Website: www.gemini360.in [www.geminivfx.com]

Gemini Film Circuit is a film distribution and production studio unit in Chennai, Tamil Nadu, India.

== Career ==
The company was founded by Ravi Shankar Prasad who also owned Anand Cine Services and it went on to produce and distribute many successful Tamil films including the remakes of Rajkumar Hirani films like Vasool Raja MBBS, Shankar Dada MBBS, Shankar Dada Zindabad & Nanban. (Note: Vasool Raja MBBS starring Kamal Haasan and Prabhu was the only Tamil film of the Munna Bhai series as only Vasool Raja MBBS was remade whereas both the films of the series (Munna Bhai M. B. B. S. and Lage Raho Munna Bhai) were remade as Shankar Dada MBBS and Shankar Dada Zindabad respectively in Telugu.) However the failure of Mani Ratnam's Kadal (2013) affected company's finances after the venture became a surprise failure at the box office, and distributors of Kadal wanted compensation before Madha Gaja Raja was released. The company made its comeback co-producing and distributing the Malayalam film Unda (2019).

== Filmography ==
=== As producer ===
Key
†	Denotes films that have not yet been released

=== Released ===
Year	Film	Director	Cast	Synopsis	Language	Notes
2004	Vasool Raja MBBS	Saran	Kamal Haasan, Prabhu, Sneha, Prakash Raj, Crazy Mohan, Nagesh, Rohini Hattangadi	A goon pretends to be a doctor to impress his parents however after his true colors are exposed he decides to join medical college to prove his worth	Tamil	A remake of Rajkumar Hirani's Munna Bhai M. B. B. S. (2003)
2004	Shankar Dada MBBS	Jayanth C. Paranjee	Chiranjeevi, Srikanth, Sonali Bendre, Paresh Rawal, Surya Bhagwandas, Girish Karnad, Venniradai Nirmala	A goon pretends to be a doctor to impress his parents however after his true colors are exposed he decides to join medical college to prove his worth	Telugu	A remake of Rajkumar Hirani's Munna Bhai M. B. B. S. (2003)
2007	Shankar Dada Zindabad	Prabhu Deva	Chiranjeevi, Srikanth, Karishma Kotak, Dilip Prabhavalkar, Sayaji Shinde	A gangster pretends to be a professor to win over a radio jockey however him seeing the reflection of Gandhi changes his life altogether.	Telugu	A remake of Rajkumar Hirani's Lage Raho Munna Bhai (2006)
2010	Kutty	Mithran Jawahar	Dhanush, Shriya Saran, Sameer Dattani	When a girl falls in love with politician's son after he threatens to jump off, other boy too falls in love with her however the girl reject him	Tamil	
2011	Mayakkam Enna	Selvaraghavan	Dhanush, Richa Gangopadhyay	An aspiring photographer becomes mentally affected after the photographer whom he claims as his inspiration took credit for the photos he had taken	Tamil	
2012	Nanban	S. Shankar	Vijay, Jeeva, Srikanth, Ileana D'Cruz, Sathyaraj, Sathyan		Tamil	A remake of Rajkumar Hirani's 3 Idiots (2009)
2012	Podaa Podi	Vignesh Shivan	Silambarasan, Varalaxmi		Tamil	
2013	Kadal	Mani Ratnam	Gautham Karthik, Thulasi Nair, Arjun Sarja, Arvind Swamy, Lakshmi Manchu		Tamil	
2019	Unda	Khalid Rahman	Mammootty		Malayalam	
2025	Madha Gaja Raja	Sundar C	Vishal, Anjali, Varalaxmi Sarathkumar, Santhanam		Tamil	Filmed in 2012 and released after 12 years

=== As distributor ===
Key
†	Denotes films that have not yet been released

=== Released ===
Year	Film	Director	Cast	Language
1995	Periya Kudumbam	K. S. Ravikumar	Prabhu, Kanaka, Vineetha	Tamil
2007	Dhee	Srinu Vytla	Vishnu Vardhan Babu, Genelia D'Souza, Srihari	Telugu
2008	Krishna	V. V. Vinayak	Ravi Teja, Trisha Krishnan, Mukul Dev	Telugu
2008	Swagatam	Dasaradh	Jagapati Babu, Anushka Shetty, Bhumika Chawla	Telugu
2008	Ready	Sreenu Vaitla	Ram, Genelia D'Souza	Telugu
2008	King	Sreenu Vaitla	Nagarjuna, Trisha Krishnan, Mamta Mohandas	Telugu
2011	Mayakkam Enna	Selvaraghavan	Dhanush, Richa Gangopadhyay	Tamil
2011	Rajapattai	Suseenthiran	Vikram, K. Vishwanath, Deeksha Seth	Tamil
2012	Thuppakki	A. R. Murugadoss	Vijay, Kajal Aggarwal	Tamil
2013	Kadal	Mani Ratnam	Arjun, Gautham Karthik, Arvind Swamy, Thulasi Nair	Tamil
2019	Unda	Khalid Rahman	Mammotty	Malayalam
2019	Sye Raa Narasimha Reddy	Surender Reddy	Chiranjeevi, Nayanthara, Tamannaah	Telugu
