= Yaan (film) =

2014 Indian film by Ravi K. Chandran

- Theatrical release poster
- Directed by: Ravi K. Chandran
- Written by: Ravi K. Chandran
- Produced by: Elred Kumar; Jayaraman
- Starring: Jiiva; Thulasi Nair
- Cinematography: Manush Nandan
- Edited by: A. Sreekar Prasad
- Music by: Harris Jayaraj
- Production company: RS Infotainment
- Distributed by: Dream Factory
- Release date: 2 October 2014
- Running time: 156 minutes
- Country: India
- Language: Tamil

Yaan (transl. I) is a 2014 Indian Tamil-language action thriller film written, directed and filmed by Ravi K. Chandran. It stars Jiiva and Thulasi Nair in her second and final acting credit. The film's soundtrack and score was composed by Harris Jayaraj, while editing and art direction were done by A. Sreekar Prasad and Sabu Cyril, respectively. Resul Pookutty was in charge of the sound mixing and Brinda was in charge of the choreography. The film was reported to be based on the 1978 film Midnight Express, was released on 2 October 2014.

== Plot ==
The film begins in Mumbai where cops plan the encounter of terrorist Malik Shah, who is a notorious criminal. The cops succeed in trapping him, and Police Commissioner Anwar Ali kills Malik. Then comes Chandrasekhar, a happy-go-lucky, jobless youth who is an MBA graduate and lives in his grandmother's expense. Chandru meets Sreela on the day of the encounter and helps her elope the spot, saving her life. Chandru falls for Sreela at first sight and starts to follow her. Though initially, she refuses him, they both fall in love soon. As usual, Sreela's father Rajan opposes their marriage as Chandru is jobless and does not have an income. Hence, Chandru decides to find a job with full fledge. He finally gets a job offer in 'Basilistan', a strict Islamic nation. Chandru travels to Basilistan with the help of a travel agent named Haridas. He also introduces Iqbal, an autistic teen boy to Chandru, who is also travelling to Basilistan for a work and asks Chandru to take care of him until they reach Basilistan.

A shock awaits Chandru and Iqbal, as they are arrested in Basilistan airport for carrying drugs. In the court, Chandru sees a man named Abdul Rashid, a wealthy entrepreneur from Basilistan, who resembles Malik. Chandru is interrogated by the officials. He claims that he is innocent but is sent to prison with a note that drug trafficking is a punishable offence in Basilistan, and he will be killed by the officials. Chandru understands that it was a trap set up by Haridas. Chandru meets Chinna, an inmate at the jail who is a Tamilian. Chinna is arrested for a small crime and is about to be released soon. Chinna tells Chandru that if someone from India can help him find a lawyer at Basilistan, he will get bail and will be released. Chandru sends a note for Sreela through Chinna, and Sreela decides to help Chandru. With Anwar's help, Sreela travels to Basilistan to rescue Chandru. She meets a Tamil taxi driver who drives her to the jail. On the way, they witness the execution of the criminals. She is shocked to see Chandru among the group and is deeply hurt. Luckily for Chandru, the execution did not happen because of the broken sword whilst executing Imran. He is taken back to jail. Chandru escapes the jail and meets Sreela. They both escape the place with the taxi driver's help.

Meanwhile, it is revealed that Rashid is none other than Malik himself, who faked the encounter with a dummy. Fearing that his identity will be revealed by Chandru, he follows Chandru and Sreela to kill them. They cross the Basilistan border with a camel, and Malik gets killed. Finally, Chandru and Sreela escape from Basilistan.

== Cast ==
- Jiiva as K. Chandrasekhar (Chandru)
- Thulasi Nair as Sreela Rajan
- Nawab Shah as Sultan Malik Shah (Terrorist) /Abdul Rashid
- Nassar as Rajan
- Jayaprakash as Anwar Ali
- Thambi Ramaiah as Chinna
- Karunakaran as Shaji
- Arjunan as Shiva
- Bose Venkat as Haridas
- Rishi as Ram
- Urmila Unni as Lakshmi
- Danush Bhaskar as Iqbal
- Alpesh Dhakan
- Bobby Bedi
- Neha Chauhan as Isha

== Production ==
=== Development ===
In an interview with The Times of India, producer Elred Kumar of RS Infotainment said that cinematographer-turned-director Ravi K. Chandran and actor Jiiva wanted to pitch a story to him, and he was initially hesitant at first as he thought that Chandran would come up with an "arty" subject, but he immediately agreed to produce the film when Chandran came up with an action story. Jiiva was revealed to be playing an unemployed MBA graduate with a "happy-go-lucky nature", while Thulasi Nair's character, Sreela, was a "sincere, responsible girl" who is just out of college and the opposite of Chandru. Stuntman Mustapha Touki, who had worked in films like Babel (2006), The Bourne Ultimatum (2007) and Zero Dark Thirty (2012), was hired to choreograph the action and stunt sequences. Karunakaran was selected to play a supporting role, in a role originally written for Prakash Raj.

=== Filming ===
The film's launch was held at Gokuldham Temple, Goregaon, Mumbai in November 2012, where photoshoots were done. By March 2013, about 65% of the film was completed in Chennai, Hyderabad and Karjat. Further shooting was done in Morocco, where a 15-day schedule was held. Shooting was also done in the Andaman and Nicobar Islands, Mumbai and Iceland. The lead pair changed 50 costumes each for the song sequence "Latcham Calorie". Two song sequences were shot in Switzerland. On 2 September 2014, Jiiva confirmed on his Twitter account that the shooting of the film was completed.

== Music ==
Yaan

Soundtrack album by Harris Jayaraj
- Released: 12 May 2014
- Recorded: 2014
- Genre: Feature film soundtrack
- Length: 23.43
- Language: Tamil
- Label: Sony Music India
- Producer: Harris Jayaraj

Harris Jayaraj chronology
Idhu Kathirvelan Kadhal (2014)	Yaan (2014)	Yennai Arindhaal (2015)

Harris Jayaraj composed the soundtrack album. He recorded the songs in New York, Florida, Haiti, Jamaica and Mexico. The album was released on 12 May 2014. In early September 2014. Harris began work on the background score of the film. On 12 September, he confirmed that the background score for the first half of the film had been completed.

Reviewing the album, S. R. Ashok Kumar of The Hindu described "Aathangara Orathil" as "interesting and energetic" and "Nenje Nenje" as "charming", while also stressing that "Latcham Calorie" "is sure to strike a chord with listeners". Karthik of Milliblog provided a mixed review and stated that, "But for "Hey Lamba Lamba" and "Nenje Nenje", Yaan is Yawn".

Track listing
No.	Title	Lyrics	Singer(s)	Length
1.	"Hey Lamba Lamba"	Vaalee	Devan Ekambaram, Krishna Iyer, Divya Vijay	4:49
2.	"Aathangara Orathil"	Kabilan	Gana Bala, MC Vickey	4:24
3.	"Latcham Calorie"	Pa. Vijay	Arjun Menon, Chinmayi	5:24
4.	"Nenje Nenje"	Kabilan	P. Unnikrishnan, Chinmayi, Praveen Saivi	3:22
5.	"Nee Vandhu Ponadhu"	Thamarai	KK, Bombay Jayashri, Ramya NSK, Megha	6:24
Total length:				24:23

== Release ==
Dream Factory bought the worldwide distribution rights of Yaan. The satellite rights of the film were sold for ₹3.5 crore (US$360,000) to Zee Tamil. The trailer of the film was launched on 3 September 2014, and reached 400,000 hits in 3 days on YouTube. The film was released on 2 October 2014.

== Critical reception ==
Baradwaj Rangan from The Hindu wrote, "Ravi K Chandran is a great cinematographer — of that, there is little doubt. But his first outing as writer-director, Yaan, is a major disappointment". M. Suganth of The Times of India gave 2 out of 5 and wrote, "...despite all the colours on the screen, this is such a dull, flavourless film, let down by the writing, which is preposterous and uninspiring". S. Saraswathi of Rediff.com gave the film 2 stars out of 5 as well and wrote, "Aside from the exceptional camera work, there is nothing remarkable about Yaan", going on to call it "a long, tedious and completely over-the-top action drama" and a "terrible bore".

IANS gave it a score of 1 out of 5 and wrote, "Jiiva has been an actor for nearly a decade and he should know best what will be accepted by the audience. Chandran has worked as a cinematographer for over two decades and he should've known better too. Together they've produced a film that makes you yawn in boredom". Sify wrote, "Yaan is a mixed bag and the noted cameraman turned director seems to be largely influenced by Bollywood flicks. It is well made, glossy but lacks a proper script". Neelima Menon wrote for Silverscreen.in, "Except for picture perfect visuals, there is hardly anything memorable about this film. One can't think of a single memorable song or line or performance, even though there was a solid technical team to back up the director".

== Plagiarism allegations ==
Although Ravi K. Chandran initially claimed that Yaan was an original script inspired by a true incident, Elred Kumar realised he had substantially plagiarised the 1978 American/British film Midnight Express. Kumar later sent a legal notice to Chandran for breaching an agreement he had signed stating that the story was original.
