= Kalla Thuppakki =

2013 Tamil film by Logiyas

- Poster
- Directed by: Logiyas
- Produced by: C. Ravi
- Starring: Vikky; Vijith; Prabhakaran; Tamilselva; Kutty Anand; Savandhika
- Music by: SK Balachandran
- Release date: 4 January 2013
- Country: India
- Language: Tamil

Kalla Thuppakki (transl. Unlicensed gun) is a 2013 Indian Tamil-language crime film directed by Logiyas and starring newcomers Vikky, Vijith, Prabhakaran, Tamilselvan, Kutty Anand and Savandhika.

== Cast ==
- Vikky
- Vijith
- Prabhakaran
- Tamilselvan
- Kutty Anand
- Sravanthika
- Sampath Ram
- Mohan Babu AVP as Raja

== Soundtrack ==
Music composed by SK Balachandran. Lyrics by DS. Gauthaman and Ilaya Kamban. A critic from IANS wrote that the music is "neither melodious, nor peppy".

Track listing
No.	Title	Singer(s)	Length
1.	"Uthi Uthi"	SK. Balachandran, Ravidevan
2.	"Salam Namaste (Chennai)"	Ananth Menon, SK. Balachandran
3.	"Kinathu Mettile"	Thanjai P. Rajasekaran, Sripriya
4.	"Thaba Thaba"	Jaiswapnah, SK. Balachandran
5.	"Midnight Kalloori"	MM. Manasi, CH. Raju, SK. Balachandran

== Controversies ==
The film was in the news for its similar title with Thuppakki (2012). The makers of this film filed a case against the makers of that film for using a similar title. Kalla Thuppakki was later denied a certificate by the censor board, citing its violent content, prompting the producer to approach the revising committee.

== Release and reception ==
The film was initially scheduled to release on Diwali 2012 (October), but was postponed to 4 January 2013. A critic from The Times of India rated the film 0.5 out of 5 and said that "In the end, [Kalla Thuppakki] misfires. The sloppy editing and uneven pacing only makes things worse". Sify wrote, "The director Logiyas seem to be totally confused making this half-baked venture, which hardly entertains or is gripping. Net result- All smoke, no fire!".
