= Kadal (2013 film) =

2013 Indian film by Mani Ratnam

- Theatrical release poster
- Directed by: Mani Ratnam
- Written by: Mani Ratnam; Jeyamohan
- Produced by: A. Manohar Prasad; A. Anand Prasad; N. Subash Chandrabose; N. Lingusamy; Mani Ratnam
- Starring: Arjun; Arvind Swamy; Gautham Ram Karthik; Thulasi Nair; Lakshmi Manchu
- Cinematography: Rajiv Menon
- Edited by: A. Sreekar Prasad
- Music by: A. R. Rahman
- Production companies: Madras Talkies; Gemini Film Circuit
- Distributed by: Gemini Film Circuit; Thirupathi Brothers
- Release date: 1 February 2013
- Running time: 164 minutes
- Country: India
- Language: Tamil
- Budget: ₹50 crore (US$5.2 million)

Kadal (transl. Sea) is a 2013 Indian Tamil-language action drama film co-written, co-produced and directed by Mani Ratnam. The film stars an ensemble cast featuring Arjun, Aravind Swamy, Gautham Ram Karthik, Lakshmi Manchu and Thulasi Nair. The film marks the debut of Gautham Karthik and Thulasi Nair. The music was composed by A. R. Rahman. The film revolves around the life of fishermen who instill the fact that faith can sometimes lead to the triumph of humanity.

The film was dubbed into Telugu as Kadali. The film was released worldwide on 1 February 2013 to mixed reviews and became a box-office failure.

== Plot ==
Bergmans, a brilliant but unruly student, is thrown out of his seminary for sinning the flesh after being caught red-handed by fellow student Sam Fernando. Blaming the good-hearted Sam for his ouster, Bergmans vows revenge and challenges to prove that evil does reign supreme in this world. Sam finishes his education and training and arrives at a village as the new father of the local church. A local boy named Thomas of this village, the illegitimate son of a local fisherman named Chetty Barnabodas, has grown up in a rough neighbourhood following his mother's death and thus being forced to fend for himself.

Sam takes the rundown church and sceptical villagers in his stride and starts bringing about changes. Through a series of incidents, he also manages to get the unruly Thomas under his control and gets him to learn the tricks of the fishing trade from the villagers. A few years later, Thomas grows up very close to Sam, a well-respected person in the village. Thomas comes across Beatrice "Bea" when she is running away from her convent school group, which had gotten her admitted to the hospital. They keep running into each other a few times, and Thomas eventually likes her presence.

Meanwhile, as Sam meditates on the remote beach, he hears gunshots on the sand. On investigation, he finds an unconscious Bergmans in the waters. On seeing that the shooters are still lurking around trying to finish their job of killing Bergmans, he pulls him to safety into an abandoned ship to take care of his bullet injuries with the help of a local village woman as well as a woman named Celina from a distant village that Bergmans asks him to get. A few villagers, including Chetty, who see Sam running around in the dark with the two women, get suspicious and accuse the three of sleeping together. They call the Bishop, upon whose interrogation, Celina admits to the sin, and Sam gets unfairly implicated. One of the villagers is also killed in the ensuing mêlée, and Sam is sentenced to four years of rigorous imprisonment.

Bergmans visits Sam in prison and admits that he got the woman to implicate him falsely to prove that evil will always triumph. When Sam returns from prison, he discovers that Thomas has fallen in cahoots with Bergmans in his smuggling trade and has committed many sins in his desire to make the village people bow before him. Thomas and Bea have also fallen in love with each other and come to seek Sam's blessings. Thomas subsequently gets to know that Bea is Bergmans's daughter and he takes Bea to Bergmans's house to trigger some long-lost memories when she recalls all the previous horrific incidents of her father, including the one of killing her mother. Bergmans gets angry, abducts Sam and Bea in his boat, and goes out to sea to kill them. However, even after a few feeble attempts, Bergmans who claims to have no emotional ties to family finds himself unable to kill his own daughter.. Thomas comes chasing them, and after a long fight between the three, he and Sam subdue Bergmans.

The film ends on a note that good finally triumphs over evil, whether Sam and Thomas's triumph over Bergmans, Thomas's suppression of his sinister inclination and rejoining forces with Sam, or Bergmans's good nature coming out in his inability to kill Bea.

== Cast ==
As per the film's opening and closing credits.

- Arjun as Bergmans (Meesakaran)
- Arvind Swamy as Father Sam Fernando
- Gautham Ram Karthik as Thomas
  - Saran Shakthi as Young Thomas
- Lakshmi Manchu as Celina
- Thulasi Nair as Beatrice, Thomas's lover and Bergmans' daughter (voice-over by Krithika Nelson)
- Ponvannan as Chetty Barnabodas, Thomas's father
- Singampuli as Clarence
- Kalairani as Mother Superior
- Guru Somasundaram as Kovil Kutty
- Vinodhini Vaidyanathan as Chandi Mary
- Ramdoss as Masilamani
- Anand Verma as Church Father
- Senthi Kumari as Chetty's wife and Thomas's stepmother
- George Vijay Nelson

Uncredited

- Devi as Sahaya Mary, Thomas's late mother
- Eka Lakhani as Bergmans' late wife
- Baby Rakshana as Young Beatrice

== Production ==
=== Development ===
During a press meet in December 2009, actor Karthik revealed that his son, Gautham Karthik would make his debut in Mani Ratnam's next venture post completion of Ratnam's bilingual films Raavan and Raavanan. In July 2010, reports emerged that the film was titled as Pookkadai. Mani Ratnam stopped pre-production work on the film in late 2010 and moved on to plan a big-budget historical project titled Ponniyin Selvan, but months later was forced to shelve it due to financial issues. Later, owing to the speculated title of the former project, the team was unable to name the film Pookkadai as an aspiring director had already registered the name in 2007. Finally the working project was renamed as Kadal in February 2012. When Mani Ratnam had finished Raavanan, Jeyamohan started writing a 200-page novel for Kadal, which was later transformed by Mani Ratnam into a screenplay. Jeyamohan was signed to be a part of the script-writing team for the film in August 2011, while Rajiv Menon was also confirmed as cinematographer for the film, reuniting with Mani Ratnam after the successes of Bombay and Guru. As the film portrays Christianity, Rajiv Menon explored the way artistes capture biblical themes. For this he and Ratnam went through Simon Schama's documentary called Power of Art on Caravaggio. For the outdoor shootings they stuck to the contemporary way. Mani Ratnam's reconnaissance for the film, the process of designing the look was done when his assistants brought back hundreds of pictures after jaunting through the entire coastline of the state Tamil Nadu, including Rameswaram.

=== Casting ===
Akshara Haasan, daughter of actor Kamal Haasan and actress Sarika was initially approached to play the female lead role but declined due to her then lack of interest in acting. In December 2011, reports emerged that Hindi film actress Sonam Kapoor was signed on to play the role after being convinced by her father but the news was proven untrue. Jhanvi, daughter of producer Boney Kapoor and actress Sridevi, was also considered to play the role. Finally in January 2012, it was revealed that Samantha was confirmed to portray the lead female role, making film Kadal her most high-profile project to that point. After production had begun, Samantha was forced to opt out of the film in June 2012 due to her PMLE ailments. The director replaced the lead female by signing Thulasi Nair, the second daughter of actress Radha. Though Thulasi was auditioned for the role during the casting process, she was not selected as Ratnam opined that she was too young for the role. Post Samantha's exit, she was roped in. The child actress in Mani Ratnam's 2002 film Kannathil Muthamittal, Keerthana was approached for a role but she chose to join the film's team as an assistant director, instead.

In November 2011, actor Arjun was signed to play a pivotal role in the film, denying reports that he would play the villain, though this was later revealed to be misdirection. Lakshmi Manchu would be playing a village belle in a negative shade, making her debut in Tamil films. Actor Lal was considered for a supporting role in the film, but dropped the film due to his commitments to the Malayalam film Ozhimuri. Arvind Swamy who returned to films post twelve years, was signed to play a full-fledged role. Child artiste Saran, earlier seen in films such as Mudhal Idam and Mye, would be seen playing Gautham Karthik's childhood role. Baby Rakshana would be playing the role of childhood Thulasi. Mani Ratnam roped in Nayantara for a special role in the film which was confirmed in early July 2012. However, the actress opted out claiming unavailability of dates and meager scope of her character in the film.

=== Filming ===
"One reason is the film's ability to take a battering—the cameras are so solid and the horizon blows out in digital camerawork, it becomes white and the sea and the sky become one."

— Rajiv Menon on the use of 35 mm film camera for Kadal making it one of the last Tamil films to use film stock.

Keeping principal photography under wraps, the director made the leading duo to undertake a 20-day acting workshop that was conducted by his crew. Later, a two-month acting workshop under the mentorship of actress Kalairani was also attended by them. The shooting of the film started in early March 2012 at Manapad, a sea village in Thoothukudi district. Scenes involving Arvind Swamy and Lakshmi Manchu were shot first. Later, in a schedule of five days, certain scenes were shot at Kottayam, Muhamma, backwaters and forts of Kochi in Kerala. The filming continued in Kerala throughout April 2012. A scene featuring the lead actors was shot at a church, created as a set in Tuticorin. Scenes were also canned in longest Indian lake Vembanad, Alappuzha. In the scenic interiors of Andaman & Nicobar Islands, twenty days filming schedule was completed by end of July 2012.

In an interview with Times of India in October 2012, Suhasini Mani Ratnam revealed that filming was in its final stages. On 31 October 2012, the crew shot the climax of the film in coastal suburbs of Chennai under the weather contrived by Cyclone Nilam. On 5 November 2012, the shooting of the film was completed except for a song to be canned in Alappuzha. This song schedule and patchwork for the film kicked off on 13 January 2013. By second last week of the same month the patch work and re-recording of the background score was completed. Post release of theatrical trailer, it was revealed that the filming of ten second osculating scene between lead actors took four hours to complete after several re-takes. The director had devoided the technicians and crew from the location to ease the situation for the actors. Post filming completions, the cinematographer stated that the film was set in a hard landscape. For initial portions of the film the crew created the barren look by emphasising sand colours and muffling vibrancy of costumes. Apparently, this was achieved to create an hostile environment in which the lead male character grows. Writer Jeyamohan told The Hindu, that the script was "deeply philosophical and spiritual", "but it has been narrated in an entertaining way, complete with songs and captivating frames. It is a grand saga..", he added.

== Music ==
Director Mani Ratnam's usual associate music composer, A. R. Rahman composed the songs as well as the background score for the film. The lyrics of three songs were penned by Vairamuthu, the other three written by his son Madhan Karky and remaining one by rapper Aaryan Dinesh Kanagaratnam, making the album feature seven tracks in the soundtrack album. The original Tamil version of the album was released on 28 November 2012, by the record label Sony Music. It topped the Indian music charts, especially iTunes India. The Telugu version of the soundtrack album was released direct to stores on 19 December 2012 and was also launched in a grand event at H.I.C.C. Novotel, Hyderabad on 2 January 2013.

== Release ==
Gemini Film Circuit bought the theatrical rights of Kadal. The film was given a U certificate by the Censor Board after five minor cuts. ATMUS Entertainment secured the distribution rights of the film in USA. The original (Tamil) version was released in 54 screens and dubbed (Telugu) version in 20 screens. The film was premiered in most of the locations of the same country a day prior to the actual release.

== Marketing ==
In February 2012, after the official announcement of the project with title several forged posters were released over the internet citing wrong credits and the film plot. On 19 November 2012 the film's official page was launched on social networking website Facebook. After two days the poster of the male lead concealing his visage was released through the same. In order to guard the facial identities of the debutantes, Mani Ratnam requested their respective parents to not let Thulasi or Gautham Karthik be snapped by anyone. Additionally they had to refrain from public appearances. The actress refused to appear at an interview for the same reason. The main theatrical trailer was released on 11 January 2013 through Madras Talkies' YouTube channel. The trailer was also attached to the theatre prints of film Alex Pandian that released on the same day. In a frenzy, the trailer crossed 1 million views within a day of its release on YouTube.

== Home media ==
The satellite rights of the film were sold to STAR Vijay.

== Reception ==
=== Critical response ===
Kadal received mixed reviews from critics. At DNA India, critic Mahalakshmi Prabhakaran quoted, "A poignant film", further adding, "The only drawback of the movie might be the fact that it drags towards the end. Else, go and watch Kadal. It is a beautifully made film". However, the Telugu version was reviewed contrary by the same source stating, "With a beautiful story and an imaginative screenplay, Kadal is a breathtaking film topped with fine performances which convey a range of emotions; the film weaves a number of immensely watchable scenes." Radhika Rajamani of Rediff quoted, "Kadal has all the elements of a regular entertainer but has nothing new in terms of a story" thereby summarising, "Kadal has nothing new to offer". T.S. Sudhir at Firstpost stated, "Mani Ratnam's Kadal leaves viewers at sea". Nandini Ramnath at Livemint noted, "Kadal is not a perfect storm, but it's far from a sinking proposition. It floats comfortably midstream, coasting along on the strength of attractive actors and visuals." However, she added more by stating, "A predictable story layered with strong performances" At Deccan Chronicle, Khalid Mohamed wrote, "Well, Mani still matters".

Simon Foster of Special Broadcasting Service noted: "Though lovingly cinematic in parts, it’s a dramatically shallow exploration of exploitable themes; a visual feast that will leave audiences intellectually under-nourished." M. Suganth of The Times of India noted, "Kadal's flaws are even more glaring. It is a failure for Mani Ratnam the storyteller, saved only to a certain extent by his visual flair." Sify reviewed, "Straight off the bat, Mani Ratnam's Kadal is nowhere in the league of his earlier films." However, applauded other aspects stating, "Rajiv Menon's striking camerawork, AR Rahman's music is one of the major plus of the film". Sahara Samay attributed the film title stating, "Confusion lasts like a sea. At the end the, movies seems like a tussle between fishing net and church." However, they added, "The music by A.R. Rahman is good and cinematography is at its best." Sangeetha Devi Dundoo of The Hindu who reviewed the Telugu version said, "Kadali is a visual and musical treat but content wise, the sailing isn't smooth." Vivek Ramz of In noted, "Kadal is a tiring watch and recommended only for die-hard Mani Ratnam fans."

=== Box office ===
In the US the film grossed ₹1.9 million (US$20,000) on the opening day. In UK and Ireland box office, the film collected £1,189 on 4 screens, with the per screen average working out to £297 summing up to £35,737. The film collected ₹20.54 lakh (US$21,000) in Britain and ₹38.19 lakh (US$40,000) in United States in first weekend.

== Awards and nominations ==
Positive nominations and awards' ceremonies held during 2013–14.

Ceremony	Category	Nominee(s)	Result	Reference(s)
24FPS International Animation Awards	Best Visual Effects Feature Film Studio India	Reliance MediaWorks for the film Kadal	Won	
Radio Mirchi South; Top 50 songs of the Year 2013	Nenjukkule (Ranked as #1)	A. R. Rahman	Won	
Vikatan Awards	Best Female Playback Singer	Shakthisree Gopalan	Won	
2013 MTV Europe Music Awards	Best Indian Act for "Nenjukkule (unplugged)"	A. R. Rahman	Nominated	
2014 Edison Awards	Best Introduced Actor	Gautham Karthik	Nominated	
2014 Edison Awards	Best Stunt Director	Kanal Kannan	Nominated	
2014 Edison Awards	Best Villain	Arjun	Nominated	
2014 Edison Awards	Best DOP (cinematography)	Rajiv Menon	Nominated	
2014 Edison Awards	Best Supportive Role	Arvind Swamy	Nominated	
2014 Vijay Awards	Best Music Director	A. R. Rahman	Won	
2014 Vijay Awards	Best Choreography	Brinda Master	Won	
2014 Vijay Awards	Best Debut Actor	Gautham Karthik	Won	
2014 Vijay Awards	Best Cinematography	Rajiv Menon	Won	
2014 Vijay Awards	Best Villain	Arjun	Won	
2014 Vijay Awards	Best Female Playback Singer	Shakthisree Gopalan	Won	
Filmfare Awards	Best Music Director	A. R. Rahman	Won	
Filmfare Awards	Best Playback Singer (Female)	Shakthisree Gopalan	Won	
Filmfare Awards	Best Debut Actor	Gautham Karthik	Won	
Filmfare Awards	Best Cinematography	Rajiv Menon	Won	
Filmfare Awards	Best Singer (Male)	A. R. Rahman	Nominated	
Filmfare Awards	Best Lyricist	Vairamuthu(for "Chithirai Nila")	Nominated	
Filmfare Awards	Best Lyricist	Madhan Karky (for "Anbin Vaasale")	Nominated	
Norway Tamil Film Festival Awards	Best Music Director	A. R. Rahman	Won	

== Controversies ==
After the release of first trailer of the film, the kissing scene between the leading debutantes was brought into discussions by media and audience. Later, Ratnam clarified that the scene has its own importance, justified in the story line of the film. Thulasi Nair in 2012 was fifteen years of age and scenes portraying such with minors, this fact added more to the same controversy. However, actress Radha, mother of Thulasi, defended stating "As I did Bharathiraja's film Alaigal Oivathillai, I was aged sixteen. There is a unique style and limitations directors have. They give proper directions to artistes. There is no mistake in doing intimate scenes if it is required for the movie." The osculating scene was later removed from the theatrical prints of the film, thereby reducing the runtime to 150 minutes.

In early February 2013, Indian Christian Democratic Party put allegations that Kadal had objectionable scenes referring to Christianity. They claimed that the film depicted their community in a cloddish manner. The members of the party proposed the deletion those scenes and warned of intensifying their protests. A memorandum in this regard was also submitted by them to police on the same day.

The film distributors suffered financial losses due to performance of the film at the box office and hence, on 9 February 2013, around fifty members, who had taken the theatrical rights of the film for various regions, protested in front of Madras Talkies' office and demanded the compensation. Defending the situation the production house claimed, "Madras Talkies had sold their film 'Kadal' (both Tamil and dubbed Telugu version) to Gemini Industries and Imaging Ltd in March 2012 itself on MG (Minimum Guarantee) basis" They added, "Madras Talkies has had no other dealing with anyone else for the distribution of their film, nor has been party to any contracts Gemini might have entered into in this regard".

Lingusamy's own production company Thirupathi Brothers had purchased the distribution rights of Mani Ratnam's Kadal for Chennai, Madurai and Coimbatore prior to the release of the movie. To the controversies over film, in a press release dated 2 March 2013, the distributor, on a positive note stated that he would never demand compensation for the losses incurred over acquiring Kadal's distribution rights. He assured that neither he nor anyone from his office would press Mani Ratnam for compensation of monetary losses incurred over Kadal at any point of time.

As per the proceedings of Madras High Court it was learnt that Mannan, one of the distributors for the film and his men issued false statements to let down the reputations of the director. With no basis and intentions to extort money from his clients, the distributor and some miscreants trespassed into Ratnam's office and abused the staff. On 14 March 2013, the judge was passed interim orders on an application arising out of a civil suit from the director and his wife. The suit claimed for a direction to Mannan to pay ₹ 50 million towards the damages.

== See also ==
- List of films directed by Mani Ratnam featuring A. R. Rahman
