= Selfie Pulla =

2014 song from Kaththi

Song by Vijay and Sunidhi Chauhan

from the album Kaththi
- Released: 24 September 2014
- Recorded: April–September 2014
- Studio: AM Studios, Chennai
- Genre: Electronic dance music, pop, kuthu, rhythm and blues
- Length: 4:51
- Label: Eros Music
- Composer: Anirudh Ravichander
- Lyricist: Madhan Karky
- Producer: Anirudh Ravichander

Kaththi track listing
- 1. "Pakkam Vanthu"; 2. "Paalam"; 3. "Kaththi Theme – The Sword of Destiny"; 4. "Selfie Pulla"; 5. "Bad Eyes – Villain Theme"; 6. "Nee Yaaro"; 7. "Aathi"

Music video
- "Selfie Pulla" on YouTube

"Selfie Pulla" (transl. Selfie Girl) is an Indian Tamil-language song composed by Anirudh Ravichander. The song was featured in the soundtrack for the 2014 Tamil action drama film Kaththi, directed by AR Murugadoss, that starred Vijay and Samantha Ruth Prabhu, and was performed by the lead actor Vijay alongside Sunidhi Chauhan, with lyrics written by Madhan Karky. The song was shot in Mumbai, featuring the lead actors, was choreographed by Shobi.

The song released as a part of the soundtrack album on 24 September 2014 through the Eros Music label. However, a rough cut of the track was leaked days before the official release. "Selfie Pulla" received positive response from music listeners and became a huge hit among youngsters. The track crossed a million views upon release in 2014, and had garnered about 113 million views as of February 2022.

== Production ==
The track was composed during late-April 2014, and by mid-June, Vijay was reported to sing for this track. While, it was initially deciphered as a "love kuththu" number, the lyricist of the track Madhan Karky stated it as a "stylish folk number". Karky wrote the lyrics for the track in August 2014. The same month, guitarist Keba Jeremiah too worked on this track. Vijay started recording for the track in September 2014, alongside Sunidhi Chauhan. The title for the song was officially revealed as "Selfie Pulla".

== Release ==
Before the official album release, a rough cut of the track was leaked onto the internet. The track, along with the film's soundtrack album, was exclusively released on 23 September 2014 through the iTunes music platform, and was mass released on 24 September 2014. The release coincided with the film's audio launch held at The Leela Palace Hotel in Chennai. Anirudh and Sunidhi Chauhan performed the song live on stage with the film's musical team.

== Reception ==
Durgesh Haridas in his review for The Indian Express stated that the song "is by far the most expected one by fans and Vijay doesn’t disappoint. Trendy lyrics from Madhan Karky, addictive guitars by Keba really carry the song" and concluded "Selfie Pulla is certainly a number that even kids will be humming". K. Siddharth of Sify wrote "the title hook of the song is pretty addictive but the song does follow the pattern of songs like 'Kattu Kattu' from Thirupaachi (2005) and 'Gandi Baat' from R... Rajkumar (2013). Vijay does an impressive job with his singing and seems to have had lot of fun while singing this number. The lyrics do focus on the current generation common terms like Instagram, Photoshop much along the lines of Google Google. Get your dancing shoes on!"

Vipin Nair of Music Aloud said that the track is "custom-made for Vijay’s limited vocal skills [...] Vijay does deliver it the right way though, alongside Sunidhi Chauhan, and the techno-kuthu fusion arrangement too is engaging".

In 2016, the song went viral in Romania after the YouTube series Nimic Nou featured the song due to the word pulla sounding similar to the Romanian word pulă, meaning dick/penis.

== Music video ==
The song was initially reported to be shot in London. But following the audio launch, on 26 September, the team headed to Mumbai for shooting the track. The song was choreographed by Shobi and about 100 dancers participated in the song sequence. Shooting for that track, being completed on 30 September, as was the entire filming being completed. The music video was launched on 24 October 2014, and crossed a million views upon release. In July 2021, the song crossed more than 100 million views. The Times of India listed the track as "one of the iconic dance numbers of the decade" saying "In this incredibly peppy number, Vijay also had the gorgeous Samantha adding to the charm, and the two actors brought out the joy of a romantic couple in a terrific way".

== Impact ==
The Students Society Party (SSP) Trust announced a challenge titled "Let's Take a Crazy Selfie Pulla," referencing a popular song. This challenge encourages youngsters to take a smiley selfie and recommend others to do the same, while also posting their selfies on the trust's official Facebook handle by tagging them. The president of SSP trust, Thamim Ansari M. said that "For every selfie posted, the SSP will contribute a stationery kit to a child at orphanages and government schools. We will reach all the needy children, says president He mentioned that giving a stationery kit not only served the purpose of assisting them in their classroom activities; they would also conduct motivational sessions to assure them that they have SSPians to support their dream." In the second season of Bigg Boss Tamil, as a part of a mini task, Mumtaj asked Sendrayan to recite the "Selfie Pulla" track in order to use the restroom. The song was played at the 2015 edition of Indian Super League's opening ceremony.

== Awards and nominations ==
Award	Date of ceremony (Note: Date is linked to the article about the awards held that year, wherever possible.)	Category	Recipient(s) and nominee(s)	Result	Ref(s)
Edison Awards	15 February 2015	Best Music Director	Anirudh Ravichander	Won	
Filmfare Awards South	26 June 2015	Best Music Director – Tamil	Anirudh Ravichander	Nominated	
Filmfare Awards South	26 June 2015	Best Lyricist – Tamil	Madhan Karky for "Selfie Pulla"	Nominated	
Filmfare Awards South	26 June 2015	Best Male Playback Singer – Tamil	Vijay for "Selfie Pulla"	Nominated	
Filmfare Awards South	26 June 2015	Best Dance Choreographer – South	Shobi	Won	
IIFA Utsavam	24–25 January 2016	Best Music Direction – Tamil	Anirudh Ravichander	Won	
IIFA Utsavam	24–25 January 2016	Best Female Playback Singer – Tamil	Sunidhi Chauhan for "Selfie Pulla"	Nominated	
Vijay Awards	25 April 2015	Favourite Song	"Selfie Pulla"	Nominated	
