= Thulasi Nair =

Indian actress

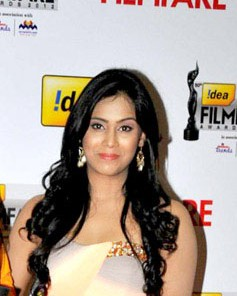
- Tulasi at 60th South Filmfare Awards 2013
- Born: 25 October 1997 (age 28); Thiruvananthapuram, Kerala, India
- Occupations: Actress; model
- Years active: 2013–2014
- Parent: Radha
- Relatives: Karthika Nair (sister)

Thulasi Nair is an Indian former actress who has appeared in Tamil language films. She made her debut in the 2013 Tamil drama film Kadal.

== Career ==
At age 14, Thulasi Nair was first considered for a role in director Mani Ratnam's Kadal after being recommended by actress Suhasini to audition for the lead role in November 2011. She was initially rejected with the director noting she was "too young for the role", before the team chose to sign her following Samantha's exit from the project. She would feature alongside fellow debutant Gautham Karthik in the leading roles, coincidentally 32 years after her mother and Gautham's father had also debuted together in Bharathiraja's Alaigal Oivathillai (1981). Nair lost twelve kilograms for the film and she went through a series of pre-production workshops conducted by actress Kalairani before the first schedule. Portraying the role of Beatrice, a young nurse with a child like personality, Nair worked alongside an ensemble cast including Arvind Swamy and Arjun and shot scenes across coastal Tamil Nadu. Her appearance was kept away from the media prior to release, with a clause in her contract preventing her from partaking in media interaction.

After the release of first theatrical trailer of the film, a kissing scene by her generated controversy as she was a minor. The film opened in February 2013 to mixed reviews and the film became a commercial failure at the box office. Nair's performance won positive reviews from critics, with Rediff.com noting that "when the script demands that she come to life at the end she manages to do it well." Similarly, another reviewer added "Thulasi, is natural and has lent an air of grace to her role", while Sify.com wrote "though she has a very little screen space, she has tried her best to do a fair job of the young, chirpy girl." Her performance fetched nominations for Best Female Debut Actress at the Vijay Awards and the South Indian International Movie Awards in 2014.

Before the release of Kadal, cinematographer Ravi K. Chandran signed on Nair to appear in a leading role in his maiden directorial venture, Yaan (2014). In Yaan, Nair played Srila, daughter of a retired defence officer, who lives in Mumbai. Featuring alongside Jiiva, the film was shot extensively in Morocco and released in October 2014 to negative reviews and became a surprise failure at the box office. She received mostly negative reviews for her portrayal with Behindwoods.com noting "she gets a better outing this time, and has some range of expressions in her bag". In comparison, Rediff.com wrote that she is "barely recognisable", and that "there is barely any chemistry between the lead pair", while describing the film as a "terrible bore". She has not acted in any further film since.

== Personal life ==
Thulasi Nair was born in a Malayali family to businessman Rajasekaran Nair and Radha, a leading actress in Tamil and Telugu films during the 1980s. Her elder sister Karthika is also an actress who appeared in Indian films, while she also has an elder brother, Vignesh Nair. Her maternal aunt Ambika was also a contemporary of Radha's, and Thulasi has revealed she often seeks advice on acting from her mother and sister.

She has juggled between completing her acting commitments and attending Podar International School in Mumbai. She completed her undergraduate in Business Administration from Russel square international affiliated with Royal Holloway London. She then continued to pursue her Master in International Management from King's College London and graduated in 2020.

== Filmography ==
Year	Film	Role	Notes
2013	Kadal	Beatrice	
2014	Yaan	Sreela Rajan	
