= Kaththi (soundtrack) =

- Soundtrack cover

Soundtrack album by Anirudh Ravichander
- Released: 24 September 2014
- Recorded: 2013–2014
- Genre: Feature film soundtrack
- Length: 25:48
- Language: Tamil
- Labels: Eros Music; Sony Music South
- Producer: Anirudh Ravichander

Anirudh Ravichander chronology
Maan Karate (2014)	Kaththi (2014)	Kaaki Sattai (2014)

Kaththi (transl. Knife) is the soundtrack album composed by Anirudh Ravichander, for the 2014 Tamil film of the same name. The film, directed by A. R. Murugadoss and produced by Lyca Productions, stars Vijay in dual roles, with Samantha Ruth Prabhu, Neil Nitin Mukesh, Tota Roy Chowdhury and Sathish. This film marks the first collaboration of Anirudh with Vijay and A. R. Murugadoss. He composed the film's theme music before signing the project, and started recording the album in late-2013 which was continued till September 2014.

The music album features seven tracks with five songs and two instrumental versions. The lyrics for the tracks were written by Madhan Karky, Yugabharathi, Pa. Vijay and Hiphop Tamizha. The film's audio was launched on 24 September 2014, at The Leela Palace Hotel in Chennai. The music album was distributed through physical and digital formats by the Eros Music label, marking their debut into Tamil music scene. The album and score received positive response from critics, with praise directed on Anirudh for his work in the album.

== Production ==
Before signing the film's project, Anirudh composed the theme music, which was featured in the digital first look poster. He later added that the album would feature two theme music versions. In April 2014, two more songs were produced after which Anirudh confirmed that three of the songs were completed. The fifth track is a romantic number and the production team were impressed with the tune composed by Anirudh.

In late-May, Bollywood music director Vishal Dadlani sang a track for the film. In June 2014, Vijay was reported to sing a "love kuththu" number. In August 2014, Andrea Jeremiah and singer Adhi of Hiphop Tamizha had each recorded a song. Hiphop Tamizha said that he had used classic Tamil words in the song. By mid-August, Anirudh had stated that he had almost completed working on the album, with the track sung by Vijay also being ready and added that "the album is full of big surprises for fans". A. R. Rahman's frequent collaborator-musician Keba Jeremiah played the guitar for one song which he labelled as "a soul stirring melody". Lyricist Madhan Karky called one of the songs he wrote a "stylish folk number".

In early September 2014, Vijay finished recording his song, titled "Selfie Pulla" and the team went to London to shoot its song sequence. Sunidhi Chauhan also roped for singing the female vocals for the track. A rough cut version of "Selfie Pulla" sung by Anirudh got leaked onto the internet before the music launch. Anirudh confirmed on 14 September 2014 that K. J. Yesudas had recorded a song for the film. Following the audio launch, Anirudh Ravichander started working on the film's background score on 9 October and had finished the score within 7 days.

In an interview with film reviewer Abishek Raja in March 2018, Anirudh said that when he composed a romantic track "Aathi", he was impressed by the 'hook-line' of the track, which transitioned from a melodious start, to a power-packed transition. Anirudh liked that 'hook-line' of this track and decided to convert it as the main theme for the film, which eventually became "The Sword of Destiny". Apart from "Selfie Pulla", Vijay also sang the Carnatic Jathi portions in the instrumental theme track "Bad Eyes – Villain Theme".

== Release ==
The audio rights were purchased by Eros Music. (Note: The Times of India reports that the audio rights were purchased for ₹25 million (US$260,000) to ₹30 million (US$310,000)) On 10 September 2014, Eros International (the co-producer and distributor) officially announced its foray into Tamil music scene, with the audio release of Kaththi, thereby being their first direct Tamil film album to be purchased. Soundarya Rajinikanth, creative head of Eros International in South branch had said that "With this move, we are looking forward to leveraging our strength in exclusively exploiting Tamil music content across all formats". Initial reports that the album release would be held in mid-September 2014 at the Wembley Arena in London, and that the lead pair would perform at the audio launch along with Anirudh proved to be untrue.

On late-August 2014, it was confirmed that the audio launch will take place on 24 September 2014. Soundarya Rajinikanth assured that the audio event will be held in a grand manner, and has been talked with high profile officials to provide proper security, after reports being surfaced of a protest led by Tamil groups against the film and its investor Lyca Productions, whose chairman and producer Subaskaran Allirajah had business links with the President of Sri Lanka, Mahinda Rajapaksa. The audio was launched at The Leela Palace Hotel in Chennai, in the presence of numerous celebrities. The event was hosted by Ma Ka Pa Anand along with Priyanka Deshpande, whilst composer Anirudh, Hiphop Tamizhan Adhi and other musicians were also part of stage performances. On 1 June 2025, Sony Music Entertainment India Pvt. Ltd.Officially released the soundtrack.

== Track listing ==
The track list was released on 21 September 2014 by Eros Music through their official Twitter account. The full album was released through iTunes digitally on 23 September 2014, and in all streaming platforms the following day. The physical CDs of the album were made available in stores on 25 September. The song "Paalam" was deleted from the film, but was reportedly included in overseas versions of the film.

No.	Title	Lyrics	Singer(s)	Length
1.	"Pakkam Vanthu"	Hiphop Tamizha	Anirudh Ravichander, Hiphop Tamizha	04:16
2.	"Paalam"	Madhan Karky	Shankar Mahadevan, Shweta Mohan	05:11
3.	"Kaththi Theme – The Sword of Destiny"	—	Instrumental: Anirudh Ravichander	01:01
4.	"Selfie Pulla"	Madhan Karky	Vijay, Sunidhi Chauhan	04:51
5.	"Bad Eyes – Villain Theme"	Instrumental	Vijay; Instrumental: Anirudh Ravichander	01:27
6.	"Nee Yaaro"	Pa. Vijay	K. J. Yesudas	03:53
7.	"Aathi"	Yugabharathi	Vishal Dadlani, Anirudh Ravichander	05:04
Total length:				25:33

== Reception ==
The album opened to positive response from critics and audiences. Durgesh Haridas of The Indian Express stated, "The OST is arguably the best for a Vijay movie in recent times and Anirudh’s variety and experimentation is helping him establishing himself as one of Kollywood's top music makers." K. Siddharth of Sify rated the album 3.5 out of 5, saying that "Kaththi has an interesting collection of several chartbusters along with experimental tracks and instrumentals. The peppy and the instantly likable tunes would work wonders for the movie if they are used properly."

Desi Music Bazaar rated 3.5 out of 5 stating "Anirudh once again proves that he is a youth-friendly composer. With tracks that are peppy and catchy, this album is sure to stay on the charts for a long time." Vipin Nair of Music Aloud gave 8 out of 10 stating that "Good mix of songs from Anirudh that should work well for an Ilayathalapathy movie." In a contrast review, Karthik Srinivasan of Milliblog wrote "Anirudh’s formula continues to work, but digressions don't."

== Background score ==
The original background score of Kaththi was released by Anirudh Ravichander, in a jukebox format through his official YouTube channel on 28 January 2015, to coincide with the film's 100th day celebration as well. It features six original scores, composed by Anirudh. The OST album was released in all digital platforms on 1 February 2015.

No.	Title	Length
1.	"Kathiresan Arrives"	01:38
2.	"Kaththi Title Music"	01:52
3.	"Interview Fight Theme"	01:24
4.	"Thanoothu Village"	02:55
5.	"Kaththi Engira Kathiresan"	01:47
6.	"Coin Fight Theme"	02:52
Total length:		12:29

== Impact ==
Celebrities such as Silambarasan and Dhanush called the album as "rocking". Actress Trisha too appreciated Anirudh's work in the film score and soundtrack. Srivatsan S. of The Hindu chose Kaththi as "one of the best films having 'mass' in the last decade" and said that the background score "goes beyond the detail of enhancing a scene" and "it adds character detail".
