= Krishna Iyer =

Indian playback singer, rapper

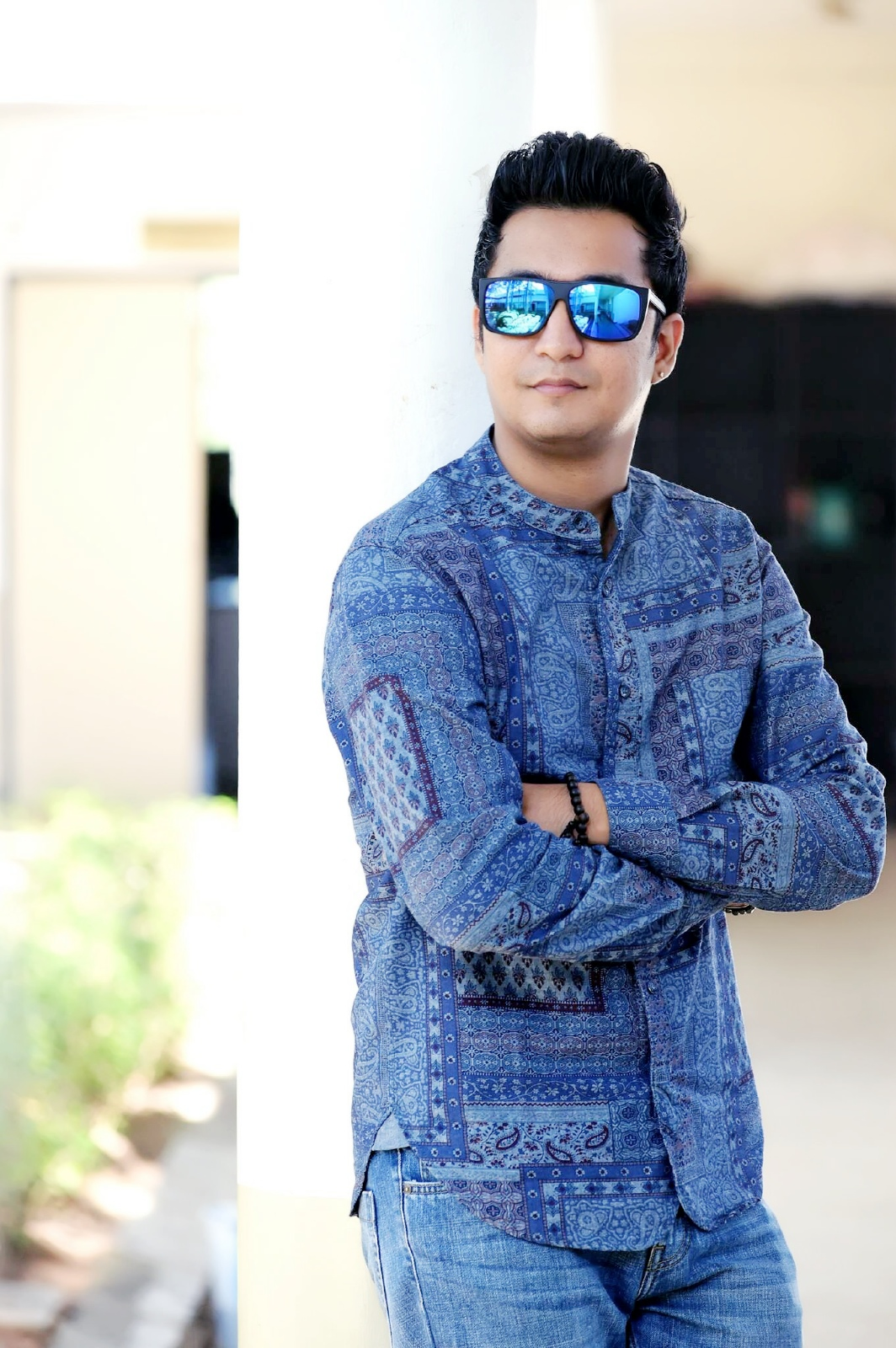
- Born: Krishna Iyer; 20 March; Chennai, Tamil Nadu, India
- Website: www.facebook.com/singerkrishnaiyer

Krishna Iyer (born 20 March) is a Tamil cinema Indian playback singer from Chennai, India who performs Tamil, Hindi, and Telugu songs. His rendition of "En Uchi Mandaila" from the film Vettaikaran, composed by Vijay Antony and starring Vijay, topped the music charts for many weeks in 2009. His first entry into the Tamil music industry was through the movie Kanthaswamy, starring Chiyaan Vikram. Krishna rendered the rap portion of the song "En Peru Meenakumari," scored by Devi Sri Prasad. He has several night shows and TV programs to his credit. Krishna Iyer has performed in several live shows internationally. His most recent singing credits include Harris Jayaraj's "Google Google" from Thuppakki, which he sang along with actor Vijay. In 2013, "Yaelae Yaelae Dosthu Da" for Harris Jayaraj, from the movie Endrendrum Punnagai, topped the iTunes India chart. He has worked with music directors Vijay Antony, Harris Jayaraj, Gv Prakash, Prasan Praveen Shyam, Selvanagesh, Shankar Mahadevan, Drummer Sivamani, Gopi Sundar, and Devi Sri Prasad.

== Discography ==
Year	Album	Composer	Songs	Notes
2009	Vettaikaaran	Vijay Antony	"En Uchimandai"	
2009	Kanthaswamy	Devi Sri Prasad	"En Peru Meenakumari"	
2010	Tamizh Padam	Kannan	"Pacha Manja"	
2011	Kullanari Koottam	V. Selvaganesh	"Aadugira Maattai"	
2012	Thuppakki	Harris Jayaraj	"Google Google"	
2013	Endrendrum Punnagai	Harris Jayaraj	"Yealae Yealae Dosthu Da"	
2014	Yaan	Harris Jayaraj	"Hey Lamba Lamba"	
2014	Gajakesari (Kannada)	V. Harikrishna	"Sui Tapak"	
2015	Yennai Arindhaal	Harris Jayaraj	"Maya Bazaar", "Yennai Arindhaal"	
2015	Yagavarayinum Naa Kaakka	Prasan Praveen Shyam	"Paprapampam", "Nee Sonna Vaarthai", "Singari Sokku Lady"	
2017	Kaadhali (Telugu)	Prasan Praveen Shyam	"Kaadhal Kaadhal", "Valentine"	
