= Thuppakki (soundtrack) =

Soundtrack album by Harris Jayaraj
- Released: 10 October 2012
- Recorded: 2011–2012
- Genre: Feature film soundtrack
- Language: Tamil
- Label: Gemini Audio
- Producer: Harris Jayaraj

Harris Jayaraj chronology
Maattraan (2012)	Thuppakki (2012)	Nanban (2012)

Thuppakki is the soundtrack album composed by Harris Jayaraj for the 2012 Tamil-language action thriller film of the same name directed by A. R. Murugadoss and produced by Kalaipuli S. Thanu, starring Vijay and Kajal Aggarwal. The album featured six songs and a theme music; lyrics for the songs were written by Pa. Vijay, Na. Muthukumar, Viveka and Madhan Karky. It was distributed by Gemini Audio and released on 10 October 2012.

== Background ==
Thuppakki is Harris Jayaraj's third collaboration with Murugadoss, and second with Vijay after Nanban (2012). The album consisted of seven tracks with lyrics written by Pa. Vijay, Na. Muthukumar, Viveka and Madhan Karky. Karky wrote over 35 pallavis for one of the songs. Vijay recorded vocals for the party number "Google Google", his first attempt at playback singing after seven years since "Vaadi Vaadi" from Sachein (2005). The song also featured vocals contributed by Andrea Jeremiah, and rap performed by Krishna Iyer and Joe. Vijay flew to Mumbai thrice to record his vocals. The song "Poi Varava" was included in the last minute as Murugadoss wanted a soulful song being dedicated to the soldiers who would guard the border. The final mixing of the film was completed by November, few days prior to the release. Justin Prabhakaran, who would later compose for films such as Pannaiyarum Padminiyum (2014), worked as a sound engineer in this film.

== Release ==
Though Harris Jayaraj initially announced that the film's music would be launched in mid-September, it was delayed following legal trouble over the film's title. The audio was eventually launched on 10 October at the Park Sheraton hotel in Chennai.

== Track listing ==
No.	Title	Lyrics	Singer(s)	Length
1.	"Kutti Puli Kootam"	Viveka	Hariharan, Tippu, Narayanan, Sathyan, Ranina Reddy	6:08
2.	"Antarctica"	Madhan Karky	Vijay Prakash, Krish, Devan, Rajeev	5:01
3.	"Poi Varava"	Pa. Vijay	Karthik, Chinmayi	5:50
4.	"Google Google"	Madhan Karky	Vijay, Andrea Jeremiah, Krishna Iyer, Joe	6:09
5.	"Vennilave"	Na. Muthukumar	Hariharan, Bombay Jayashri	4:52
6.	"Alaikaa Laikka"	Pa. Vijay	Javed Ali, Sayanora Philip, Sharmila	5:03
7.	"Jagadish on Mission" (Instrumental)			3:26
Total length:				36:29

== Reception ==
=== Critical reception ===
Sify wrote: "Overall, it is a classy and refreshing album". Pavithra Srinivasan of Rediff claimed that the music had "nothing new to offer" and that "except Google Google and the mildly melodious Poi Varavaa, the rest are all oft-heard, and seem a mish-mash of his (Jayaraj's) earlier tunes". Karthik Srinivasan of Milliblog stated that "Vijay does well in 'Google Google', a basic, but foot-tapping song where Andrea provides excellent support", whereas he felt "Kutti Puli Kootam" sounding "straight out of the fag-end of Rahman's music for pointless Prabhu Deva films" calling it as "plain embarrassing". He considered "Antartica" as an "amazingly non-descript, regurgitated Harris material" while "Poi Varava" being "pleasant" also felt "too standard within Harris’ usual template", and "'Vennilave' is a jaded addition to Harris’ Bombay Jayashri template". While calling "Alaikka Laikaa" is another "mandatory gibberish-loaded Harris song", he also added "'Jagdish on mission' theme closes the soundtrack on a decent note".

Haricharan Pudipeddi of The New Indian Express stated that "Except for two tracks, Harris' music falls flat. Thanks to the pulsating background score, Thuppakki has few moments of high-octane action mixed with energetic music." Critic based at Deccan Chronicle also stated, "Harris Jayaraj disappoints". L Romal M Singh of Daily News and Analysis wrote "What doesn’t work, however, are the songs in the film. A lot of money seems to have been spent on all the songs (and their picturisation) and other than the penultimate song, Vennilave and Google Google, most of the songs are boring to listen to and a pain to watch. The final number, Poi Varavaa, picturised on army folk boarding trains from Mumbai as they head back to their duty and call, manages to strike a chord with the audience, even leading to some final heart wrenching moments in the film."

Karthik Subramanian of The Hindu wrote "Music director Harris Jayaraj, though, seems to have had a surprisingly off-time with the songs. The background music is apt though it is significantly reminiscent of several popular scores." Vivek Ramz of In.com wrote "Harris Jayaraj has once again composed all the songs in his typical template style with the only exception being the part track 'Google Google' sung by Vijay himself. However, he has improved on the re-recording front from his recent debacle in 'Maattrraan' and increases the tempo with the 'Jagdish on Mission' theme whenever needed."

=== Accolades ===
Award (Note: Awards, festivals and organisations are in alphabetical order.)	Date of ceremony (Note: Date is linked to the article about the awards held that year, wherever possible.)	Category	Nominee(s)	Result	Ref.
Big FM Tamil Melody Awards	19 August 2013	Best Music Director of the Year	Harris Jayaraj (Note: also for Oru Kal Oru Kannadi)	Won	
Edison Awards	10 February 2013	Best Lyricist	Madhan Karky for "Google Google"	Won	
Edison Awards	10 February 2013	Best Female Playback Singer	Andrea Jeremiah for "Google Google"	Nominated	
Filmfare Awards South	20 July 2013	Best Music Director – Tamil	Harris Jayaraj	Nominated	
Filmfare Awards South	20 July 2013	Best Lyricist – Tamil	Madhan Karky for "Google Google"	Nominated	
Filmfare Awards South	20 July 2013	Best Female Playback Singer – Tamil	Andrea Jeremiah for "Google Google"	Nominated	
Mirchi Music Awards South	26 August 2013	Song of the Year – Listener's Choice	"Google Google"	Won (4th place)	
Mirchi Music Awards South	26 August 2013	Album of the Year – Listener's Choice	Thuppakki	Won (2nd place)	
South Indian International Movie Awards	12–13 September 2013	Best Male Playback Singer	Vijay for "Google Google"	Nominated	
South Indian International Movie Awards	12–13 September 2013	Best Music Director	Harris Jayaraj	Won	
Vijay Awards	11 May 2013	Favourite Song	Harris Jayaraj for "Google Google"	Won	
