= The Leela Palace Chennai =

Luxury hotel in Chennai, India

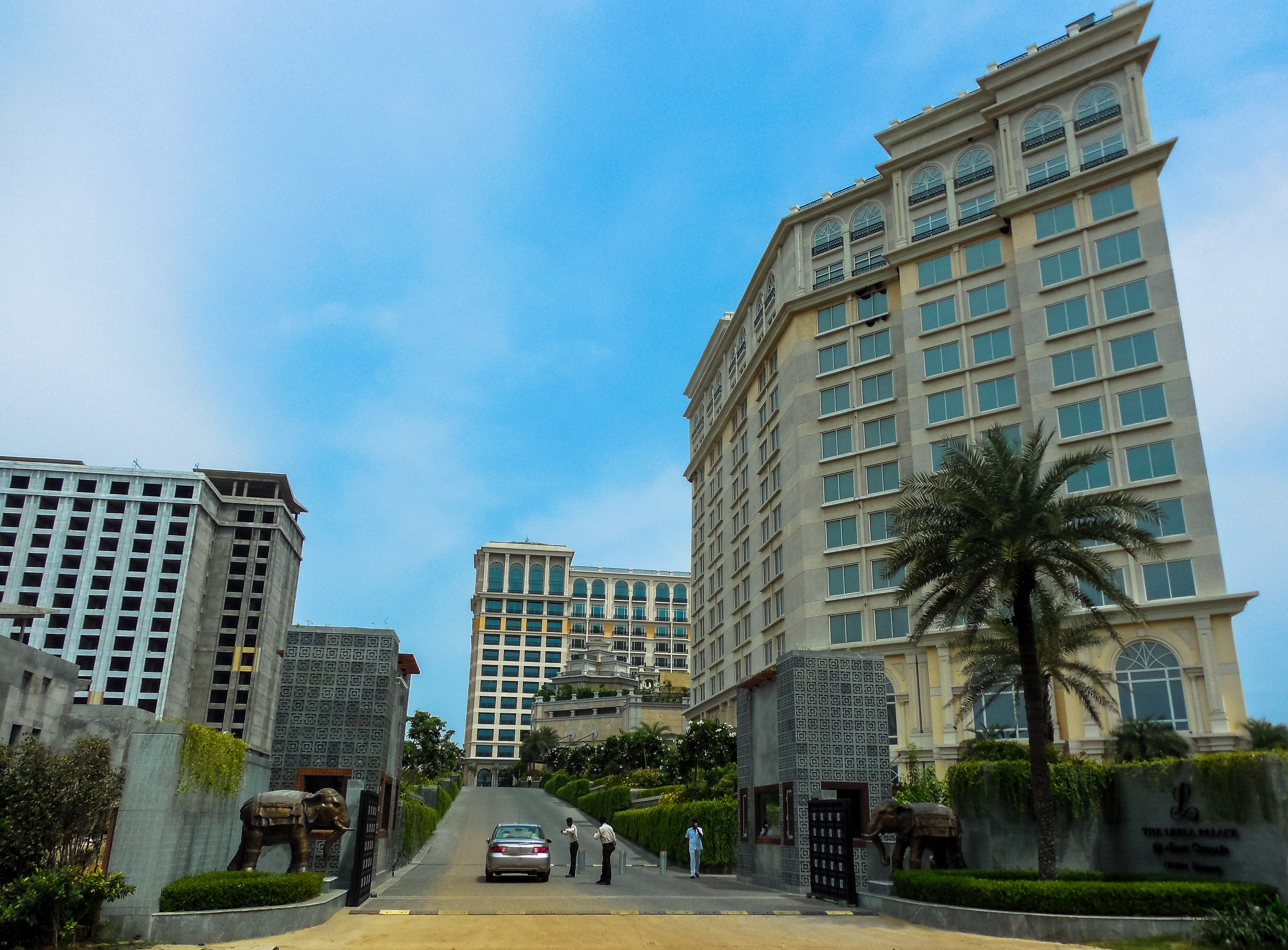
- Interactive map of the The Leela Palace Chennai area
- Hotel chain: The Leela Palaces, Hotels and Resorts

General information
- Location: Chennai, India, MRC Nagar, Raja Annamalaipuram; Chennai, Tamil Nadu 600 028
- Coordinates: 13.017285°N 80.273575°E
- Operator: The Leela Palaces, Hotels and Resorts

Height
- Height: 64.8 m (213 ft)

Technical details
- Floor count: 16
- Floor area: 831,000-square-foot (77,200 m^{2})

Design and construction
- Architects: SRSS & Associates, Inc. (Eskay Design, Local Architects, DesignWilkes, Interior Designers)

Other information
- Number of rooms: 326

Website
- The Leela Palace Chennai

The Leela Palace Chennai is a 326-room five star deluxe hotel in Chennai, India. It is located at MRC Nagar, Raja Annamalaipuram, in the Adyar Creek area in the southern end of the Marina Beach. The hotel is designed by Atlanta-based architects Smallwood, Reynolds, Stewart, Stewart and Associates, Inc. and is themed after the Chettinad architecture of Tamil Nadu. With the project cost exceeding ₹ 8,000 million, the hotel was expected to open in September 2012. However, delays in construction and operation preparation have pushed its inaugural date to January 2013.

== History ==
The land for the hotel was acquired from industrialist M. A. M. Ramaswamy for about ₹ 700 million.

In September 2014, ESPA, a 16,000-square feet spa, was opened at the hotel.

In September 2017, the hotel was purchased from the Leela Group by the American private equity fund Marigold Capital for ₹ 7,000 million.

== The hotel ==
Located on 6.25 acres near Adyar Creek facing the Bay of Bengal, the 16-story hotel with a built-up area of 831,000 sq ft has 326 rooms, including 295 deluxe or premiere room and 31 suites. The colonial-style building features 2,601 sq m of banquet and meeting facilities, including a 1,390 sq m ballroom and a traditional landscaped courtyard, bars, a 1,394 sq m health club/spa and a 1,060 sq m boutique retail plaza. In addition, there are Indian, Chinese and Italian restaurants and a cake shop. There are a total of 6 meeting rooms in the hotel. The project will use LED lights for all its external lighting and all major internal areas and will also collect water on a major scale from rain water harvesting.

The 12-room ESPA spa was designed by Jeffrey Wilkes of DesignWilkes and Madhu Nair of The Leela Hotel. It covers an area of 16,000 sq. ft. The hotel has its own ensemble of musicians playing Carnatic music.

== Software park ==
The hotel also has a 250,000 sq ft commercial property, the Leela Business Park, located next to the hotel property. However, the group is planning to sell the commercial property to raise funds for its hotel venture. Talks were on with the Reliance Industries, which was planning to buy the IT Park for ₹ 1,720 million. Reliance Industries signed the deal in late February for the said amount.

== See also ==
- Hotels in Chennai
- List of tallest buildings in Chennai
