= Rasigan =

1994 film by S. A. Chandrasekhar

- Poster
- Directed by: S. A. Chandrasekhar
- Screenplay by: S. A. Chandrasekhar
- Story by: Shoba
- Produced by: B. Vimal
- Starring: Vijay; Sanghavi; Vichithra
- Cinematography: Ravishankar
- Edited by: P. R. Gautham Raj
- Music by: Deva
- Production company: B. V. Combines
- Distributed by: XB Film Creators
- Release date: 8 July 1994
- Running time: 140 minutes
- Country: India
- Language: Tamil

Rasigan (transl. Admirer) is a 1994 Indian Tamil-language romantic action film written and directed by S. A. Chandrasekhar. The film stars his son Vijay, Sanghavi and Vichithra in the lead roles. It revolves around Vijay and Anitha who secretly love each other but are unable to confess their love for each other. Her father realises this and tries to separate the two. However, fate has other plans.

This was the first film where Vijay was credited with the prefix "Ilaya Thalapathy" (young commander-in-chief). Vijay also made his singing debut through the film's song "Bombay City Sukka Rotti". The film ran for 175 days in theatres and was a commercial hit.

== Plot ==
Vijay lives in Ranipet with his grandmother Maruthayi, whom he adores. He is in love with his neighbour Anitha, the daughter of a police officer Raghavan, even though both pretend to hate each other in front of their families. Vijay and Anitha constantly make excuses to go to their common terrace to have sex and bathe together. But when Raghavan finds out about their relationship, he is furious. He requests for a transfer to Madras to keep Anitha away from Vijay. Before leaving, he catches Anitha holding love letters written to her by Vijay and angrily throws them in Vijay's face. Vijay notices that all these letters contain Anitha's new address in Madras (Anitha had deliberately mentioned them in the love letters) and immediately leaves for Madras.

In Madras, Vijay stops at a restaurant to eat. When he asks a waiter about the restroom, he is warned not to use the upstairs restroom. Nevertheless, he goes to the upstairs restroom, where he notices a porn film shoot happening illegally. He is caught by the restaurant manager as well as the restaurant owner Singaara Naidu's son, who are both involved in the illegal shoot. In the fight that ensues, Naidu's son accidentally trips on a broken bottle and dies, and the blame is laid on Vijay, who is forced to go on the run. Raghavan is assigned the case to nab Vijay and is determined to bring him to justice. He offers a reward to anyone who can capture Vijay.

While on the run, Vijay is caught by constables Ekambaram and Karpooram but manages to escape from them. In the process, however, Ekambaram accidentally kills the restaurant manager, who is also pursuing Vijay to kill him and prevent him from exposing the truths about what is happening in the restaurant. The manager's death is also blamed on Vijay. Eventually, Vijay is rescued by Rani, a female autorickshaw driver who used to work as a servant maid in his house and has a crush on him, and takes him to her house, where he reunites with Maruthayi, who is convinced that he is innocent. At this juncture, Raghavan arrives and arrests Vijay, but at the police station, he realizes that Vijay is innocent and decides to help him expose Naidu.

Meanwhile, Anitha is kidnapped by Naidu's men. Vijay escapes from police custody, rescues Anitha and confronts Naidu. But just as he is about to kill Naidu, Raghavan arrives and kills Naidu. He apologizes to Vijay for whatever had happened and accepts his relationship with Anitha.

== Cast ==
- Vijay as Vijay
- Sanghavi as Anitha
- Vichithra as Rani
- Srividya as Bhagyalakshmi
- Manorama as Maruthayi
- Vijayakumar as Raghavan
- Goundamani as Ekamabaram
- Senthil as Kapooram
- Vijaya Rangaraj as Singaara Naidu
- Madhusudhan Rao as Inspector Sharma
- S. A. Chandrasekhar in a special appearance in the song "Thambi Konjam"

== Production ==
Rasigan was the first film in which Vijay was credited with the prefix "Ilaya Thalapathy" (young commander-in-chief) by his father himself, an epithet by which he would be credited in the remainder of his films till Bairavaa (2017), following which it was shortened to "Thalapathy" in Mersal the same year. It was Vijay's third film as a lead actor, and Sanghavi's third film. Vijay helped her with dialogue pronunciation.

== Soundtrack ==
The music was composed by Deva. Vijay made his singing debut through the song "Bombay City Sukka Rotti".

Track listing
No.	Title	Lyrics	Singer(s)	Length
1.	"Silena Silena"	Vaali	S. N. Surendar, Swarnalatha	4:46
2.	"Auto Rani"	Vaali	Mano, Swarnalatha	5:13
3.	"Beechoram"	Vaali	S. P. Balasubrahmanyam, K. S. Chithra	5:01
4.	"Love Love Mama"	Vaali	S. P. Balasubrahmanyam, Shoba Chandrasekar	4:53
5.	"Bombay City"	Vaali	Vijay, K. S. Chithra	4:55
6.	"Thambi Konjam"	P. R. C. Balu	Deva	4:51
Total length:				29:42

== Release and reception ==
Rasigan was released on 8 July 1994. Malini Mannath of The Indian Express wrote, "It is his third film, and Vijay shows a marked improvement in his performance and expressions [...] The director's script and treatment seems to be geared to suit the tastes of frontbenchers." Ananda Vikatan gave the film a score of 28 out of 100. R. P. R. of Kalki heavily criticised the film for its vulgarity.
