= Google Google =

2012 song from Thuppakki

Song by Vijay, Andrea Jeremiah, Krishna Iyer and Joe

from the album Thuppakki
- Released: 10 October 2012
- Recorded: 2011–2012
- Genre: Electronic dance music, pop
- Length: 6:09
- Label: Gemini Audio
- Composer: Harris Jayaraj
- Lyricist: Madhan Karky
- Producer: Harris Jayaraj

Thuppakki track listing
- 1. "Kutti Puli Kootam"; 2. "Antartica"; 3. "Poi Varava"; 4. "Google Google"; 5. "Vennilave"; 6. "Alaikaa Laikka"; 7. "Jagadish on Mission"

Music video
- "Google Google" on YouTube

"Google Google" is an Indian Tamil song composed by Harris Jayaraj for the soundtrack of the 2012 film Thuppakki directed by AR Murugadoss. The song written by Madhan Karky and was sung by Vijay and Andrea Jeremiah with rap portions by Krishna Iyer and Joe.

== Production ==
Initially, Vijay was not supposed to be a part of the song, but he became one of the singers after singing the song in a jiffy, marking his return to singing after a sabbatical. For the song, Vijay flew in three times to Mumbai. The songs alludes to Vijay's inclusion with the opening line "This is Vijay, and it uses the names of online platforms such as Google and Yahoo.

== Release and reception ==
The teaser for the song was released on 1 November 2012. Upon release, the song was a chartbuster. The success of the song further prompted to Vijay to sing several songs for his subsequent films. The making video featuring Vijay, Kajal Aggarwal, Andrea Jeremiah and the film crew was released on 2 November 2012. Krish and Andrea Jeremiah sang the song at the 6th Vijay Awards. Shah Rukh Khan and Vijay danced to the song at the 7th Vijay Awards. Udhayanidhi Stalin named his dog Google after the song.

=== Critical reception ===
A critic from The Hindu wrote that "There are seven songs in the album and ‘Google Google,’ sung by actor Vijay, is the best. The engineer-turned-lyricist Karky has used English words appealingly in the song". Karthik Srinivasan of Milliblog wrote that "Vijay does well in Google google, a basic, but foot-tapping song where Andrea provides excellent support". A critic from Rediff.com wrote that "the interludes are all filled with weird and wonderful sounds as is usual in a Harris Jeyaraj number". A critic from the IANS wrote that "Google Google", crooned by Vijay and Andrea Jeremiah with good-humoured lyrics, is an uplifting foot-tapping disco number. The lyrics subtly touch upon the susceptibility of modern-day relationship between a boy and girl".

== Accolades ==
Accolades for "Google Google"
Year	Award	Category	Winner	Result	Ref.
2013	7th Vijay Awards	Favourite Song	Harris Jayaraj	Won	
2013	Filmfare Awards South	Best Lyricist – Tamil	Madhan Karky	Nominated	
2013	Filmfare Awards South	Best Female Playback Singer – Tamil	Andrea Jeremiah	Nominated	
2013	SIIMA Awards	Best Male Playback Singer	Vijay	Nominated	
2013	Edison Awards	Best Lyricist	Madhan Karky	Won	
