= Thuppakki =

2012 Indian film by A. R. Murugadoss

- Theatrical release poster
- Directed by: A. R. Murugadoss
- Written by: A. R. Murugadoss
- Produced by: Kalaipuli S. Thanu
- Starring: Vijay; Kajal Aggarwal
- Cinematography: Santosh Sivan; Natty (1 song)
- Edited by: A. Sreekar Prasad
- Music by: Harris Jayaraj
- Production company: V Creations
- Distributed by: Gemini Film Circuit
- Release date: 13 November 2012
- Running time: 170 minutes
- Country: India
- Language: Tamil
- Budget: ₹70 crore
- Box office: ₹121 crore

Thuppakki (/θuppɑːkki/; Tamil pronunciation: [t̪upaːki]; transl. Gun) is a 2012 Indian Tamil-language action thriller film written and directed by A. R. Murugadoss. Produced by Kalaipuli S. Thanu, the film stars Vijay and Kajal Aggarwal, with Sathyan, Vidyut Jammwal, Jayaram, Manobala and Zakir Hussain in supporting roles. It revolves around an intelligence officer in the Indian Army, who seeks to track down, destroy and deactivate a sleeper cell, after witnessing and barely escaping a bombing carried out by the cell.

The project, which marked the beginning of a collaboration between Vijay and Murugadoss, was reported in July 2011, and the film's title was formally announced that December. Principal photography commenced in January 2012 and ended that October. Filming mostly took place in Mumbai, except for two song sequences which were filmed in Bangkok and Switzerland. The film's soundtrack was composed by Harris Jayaraj with cinematography handled primarily by Santosh Sivan and editing by A. Sreekar Prasad.

Thuppakki was released on 13 November 2012, Diwali day, and distributed by Gemini Film Circuit. The film went through numerous controversies, including protests from Islamic fringe groups who objected to the portrayal of the Islamic community in the film. Nevertheless, it received mostly positive reviews and became a major commercial success. A recipient of various accolades, the film received seven Filmfare Awards South nominations in the Tamil branch, but did not win in any category. In 2014, the film was remade in Bengali as Game and in Hindi as Holiday: A Soldier Is Never Off Duty by the same director.

== Plot ==
Captain Jagadish Dhanapal, a DIA specialist in the Indian Army, arrives at Mumbai from Jammu. On his arrival, his parents and younger sisters force him to see Nisha, a prospective bride. After the bride-viewing ceremony, Jagadish makes up excuses to avoid marrying her, which include commenting about her being traditional. On the contrary, Nisha turns out to be a university-level boxer, who is completely modern in her outlook, having been forced to appear traditional by her parents. Jagadish notices her in a boxing match and falls in love with her. Nisha reciprocates after refusing him initially.

One day, Jagadish witnesses an explosion in a bus in which he and his police officer-friend Balaji had travelled. He manages to capture an injured man who had planted the bomb, who later escapes from the hospital where he was kept under custody. Jagadish captures the bomber again and also forces the security chief, who helped the bomber escape, to commit suicide. Jagadish learns that the bomber is a mere executor, a sleeper agent, whose only role was to plant the bomb. He also discovers that the terrorist group that the bomber belongs to has planned twelve such attacks in the city in a couple of days. Jagadish enlists the help of his fellow army men and manages to kill the sleeper agents planting the bombs, including the sleeper agent leader's brother, Afsar Ali, and the previously captured sleeper agent.

When the leader of the sleeper cell learns about Jagadish's role in thwarting the attack, he begins to target the families of the army men, except Jagadish, by kidnapping someone close to them. When Jagadish realises the plan, he substitutes one of the people to be kidnapped with his younger sister, Sanjana. Using his pet dog and his sister's dupatta, Jagadish manages to reach the sleeper cell's hideout, rescuing his sister, who was about to be killed after Jagadish's bluff was exposed, and the other victims, and eliminates the sleeper agents assembled there. The second-in-command of the sleeper agents is captured and killed by Jagadish. With this attack too having failed, the sleeper cell leader decides to target Jagadish himself. He kills one of Jagadish's friends and asks Jagadish to surrender, or else there would be more attacks.

Jagadish decides to sacrifice his life and devises a plan with his fellow army men. He also breaks up with Nisha, wanting to keep her away from the truth. Jagadish meets the leader on a ship, which has been rigged with a bomb planted by another friend of Jagadish. When he learns about the leader's plan of infiltrating the Indian Army with sleeper agents with the help of a traitor in the Indian Defense – Kameeruddin IAS, the current Joint Secretary in Defence, Jagadish decides to abandon his suicidal plan. After an extensive beating, he mocks the leader and compels him to a fight. He gains the upper hand before escaping in a boat, with the leader as a hostage. After the ship explodes, he kills the bewildered leader. Jagadish confronts Kameeruddin and forces him to commit suicide, and later returns to Jammu along with his fellow army men after reconciling with Nisha.

== Cast ==
- Vijay as Captain Jagadish Dhanapal (Note: Alternatively spelt as Jagdish in the film.)
- Kajal Aggarwal as Nisha
- Sathyan as Balaji
- Vidyut Jammwal as the sleeper cell's leader (Voice: Abhinay)
- Jayaram as Major V. Ravichandran
- Manobala as Nisha's father
- Zakir Hussain as Kameeruddin
- Raneesh Thiagarajan as Senthil/Raneesh
- Meenakshi as Nisha's friend
- Shankara Narayanan as Jagadish's father
- Deepthi Nambiar as Sanjana
- Anupama Kumar as Nisha's mother
- Gautham Kurup as a sleeper agent
- Md Asif as Asif Ali
- Sanjana as Jagadish's youngest sister
- Mangala Radhakrishnan as Jagadish's mother
- Akshara Gowda as Swetha (cameo appearance)
- Prayas Mann as Afsar Ali (uncredited)
- Prasanth Nair as Noel (uncredited)
- A. R. Murugadoss (uncredited appearance in the song "Google Google")
- Santhosh Sivan (uncredited appearance in the song "Google Google")

== Production ==
=== Development ===
In July 2011, it was reported that Vijay and A. R. Murugadoss would collaborate to make an action film, after completing their then-respective ongoing projects, Velayudham, Nanban, and 7 Aum Arivu. Vijay's father S. A. Chandrasekhar was initially going to produce the film, but Kalaipuli S. Thanu eventually took over, producing it under his banner V Creations. Although the film was initially titled Maalai Nerathu Mazhaithuli, in December 2011, the new title was revealed: Thuppakki. Instead of his regular editor Anthony and art director Rajeevan, Murugadoss chose A. Sreekar Prasad and Thota Tharani for those positions, respectively. Santosh Sivan was hired as cinematographer. In 2014, Akshay Kumar revealed that Murugadoss narrated the script to him in 2010, with the film intended to be in Hindi, but the project could not start due to time constraints, resulting in Murugadoss making it in Tamil with a different actor.

=== Casting ===
Though Kingfisher Calendar model Angela Jonsson took part in a brief photoshoot with Vijay by Sivan in Chennai, Kajal Aggarwal was eventually confirmed as the female lead. Priya Anand was initially signed on as the lead actress, but could not commit due to scheduling conflicts with English Vinglish (2013). Akshara Gowda joined the cast for a single scene as she only wanted to "gain the experience of working with Murugadoss". In early 2012, Vidyut Jammwal, who was simultaneously shooting for Billa II, said he would play the main antagonist. Jammwal's voice was dubbed by Abhinay. Sathyan confirmed his participation in the film in January 2012, and Malayalam actor Jayaram confirmed his presence the following month. In March 2012, Deepthi Nambiar, who previously starred in Murugadoss' production venture Engaeyum Eppothum (2011), was cast as Vijay's sister and shot simultaneously alongside Thulli Vilayadu and the Malayalam film Cherukkanum Pennum. In April 2012, Murugadoss confirmed that he himself would appear onscreen. That was eventually revealed to be a cameo in the song "Google Google", where Sivan also cameoed. Dubai-based Malayali orthodontist Prasanth Nair was also signed to play a small but important role of a commando, making it his acting debut in Tamil cinema. Raneesh played an army man, marking his fifth collaboration with Vijay after Thullatha Manamum Thullum (1999), Badri (2001), Shahjahan (2001) and Thamizhan (2002).

=== Filming ===
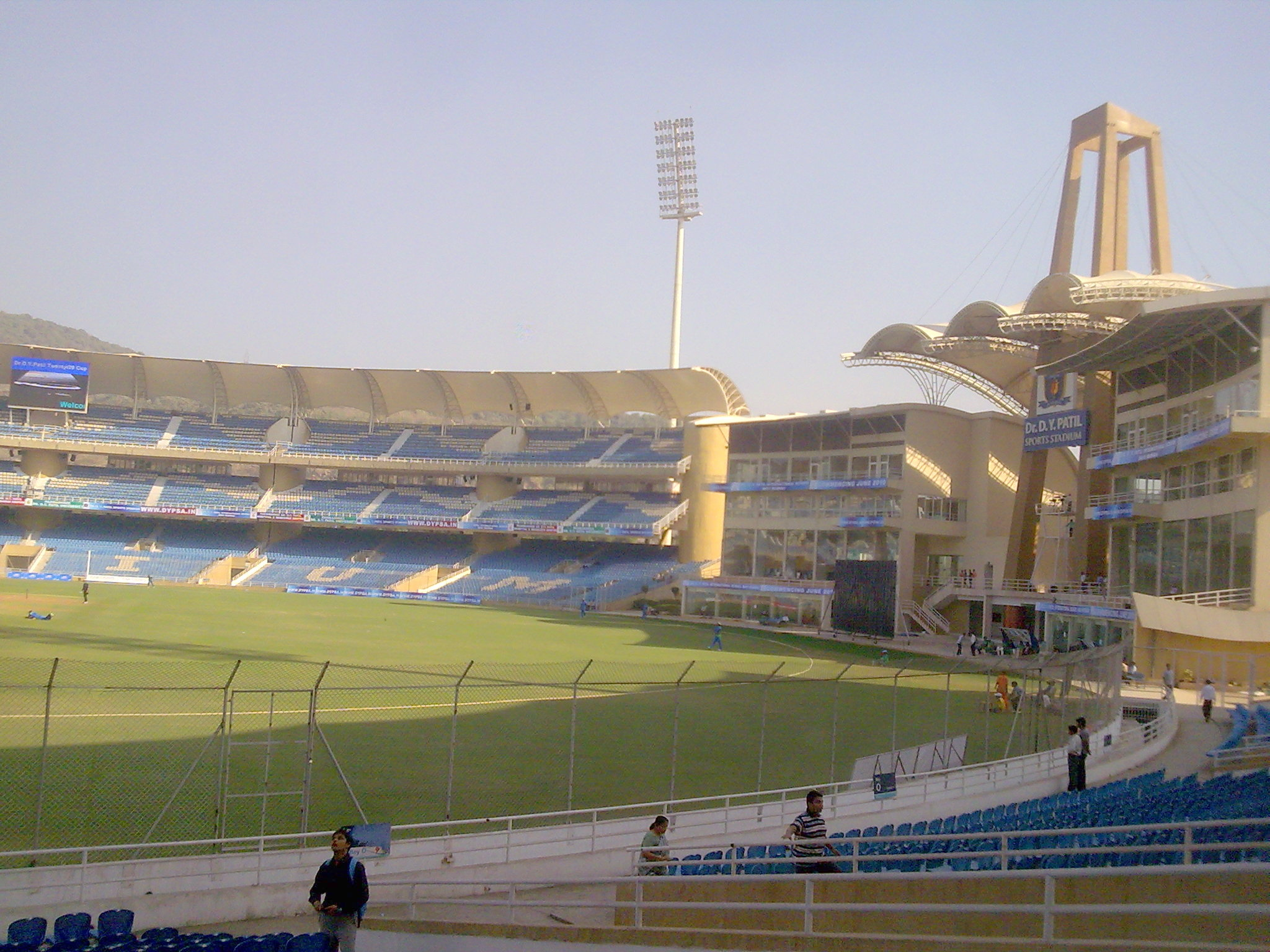
DY Patil Stadium, as seen in the song "Antarctica".

Principal photography was initially supposed to start on 26 November 2011, but the first schedule began in January 2012, and lasted for 35 days. At Linking Road in Bandra, Vijay acted and operated the camera himself for one scene with Sivan's assistance, which had to be filmed quickly with the unaware public. Sivan commented that it was shot perfectly and decided to retain it in the film. A major part of the film was being shot in real locations with hidden cameras. Sivan shot Thuppakki with an Arri Alexa camera, as opposed to traditional 35 mm film. Although Sivan has mostly preferred to shoot on film, he stated that he shot Thuppakki digitally because "the story and milieu of [Murugadoss's] script demanded it".

In March, the unit completed a 10-day shoot in Bangkok for "Google Google", picturised on Vijay and Aggarwal. In Mumbai, while Vijay was filming a sequence which involved him jumping from a height, he slipped and injured his knee; he was not wearing a knee-pad at the time. Shooting was stalled following the incident and Vijay left to London to undergo treatment. One of the film's songs was shot atop of a train, along with 300 dancers constructed by art director Sunil Babu. The dance sequence, choreographed by Shobi, was shot in the Mumbai–Pune Expressway. Another song, "Vennilave" was shot in Switzerland; since Sivan was unable to give dates, Natty Subramaniam shot it instead. The song "Antarctica" was shot at DY Patil Stadium in Mumbai, with which principal photography wrapped. The budget of the film was estimated to be ₹700 million (equivalent to ₹1.4 billion or US$15 million in 2026).

== Music ==
Harris Jayaraj composed the soundtrack of Thuppakki, collaborating with Murugadoss for the third time after Ghajini (2005) and 7 Aum Arivu and third time with Vijay after the 2000 Coca-Cola TVC and Nanban (2012). The lyrics were written by Na. Muthukumar, Pa. Vijay, Viveka and Madhan Karky, who had written over 35 pallavis for one of the songs, with one being finalised. The party number "Google Google", a duet between Andrea Jeremiah and Vijay, marked the latter's return to playback singing after a seven-year sabbatical; his last song was "Vaadi Vaadi" from Sachein (2005). Though Harris Jayaraj had announced in August that Thuppakki's audio launch would take place in September, the audio was eventually released on 10 October 2012.

== Release ==
Thuppakki was earlier scheduled to be released on 9 November 2012, receiving a U/A certificate. However, after minor cuts from the Central Board of Film Certification the film received a 'U' certificate. The makers opted for a traditional Friday release, since the date appears four days ahead of Diwali, which falls on 13 November, a Tuesday. However, the makers reconsidered their decision and pushed the release coinciding towards the festival. Thuppakki released along with Podaa Podi and Jab Tak Hai Jaan. The film released in more than 1500 screens, becoming the widest release for a Vijay film at that time.

Post release, Islamic fringe groups protested against the film and its makers, claiming that it portrayed Muslims as terrorists and traitors. Some of the activists gathered near Vijay's residence at Neelankarai on 14 November 2012, a day after its release, and raised slogans against him and the film in Arabic and Urdu. Later, Murugadoss, Thanu and S. A. Chandrasekhar later apologised openly to representatives of 23 different Muslim outfits, and agreed to delete the scenes to which objections were raised.

=== Distribution ===
Gemini Film Circuit distributed the original Tamil version. Several distributors including Bellamkonda Suresh, Geetha Films, Suresh Films and SVR Media competed for the Telugu dubbing rights, with SVR eventually purchasing the rights for ₹15 crore. ATMUS Entertainment distributed the film in North America, and BR Films International did so in France.

=== Marketing ===
Thuppakki's first look poster was leaked on 30 April 2012, a day prior to its scheduled release. The poster, that depicted Vijay holding a cigar in his mouth, was criticised by social activists for violating the Indian Tobacco Act, which prohibits advertising tobacco products. Murugadoss explained that it was only for promotional purposes and added that the film had no such scenes, claiming that even a small sequence featuring Vijay smoking had been deleted from the film.

Another poster, released later in the year, depicted a police-uniform clad Vijay carrying Aggarwal on his hands, was believed to have been lifted from a poster of An Officer and a Gentleman (1982). Murugadoss claimed that Thuppakki did not have an army backdrop like An Officer and a Gentleman, but was set in Mumbai instead, going on to assert that everything in his film was original. He, however, admitted to having used the poster of An Officer and a Gentleman, and told The Hindu, "Sometimes, you admire something so much that sub-consciously it becomes a part of your work".

The makers initially announced that the film's first trailer would be released on 22 June 2012, during Vijay's birthday. However, the teaser release was postponed to the first week of July to avoid clashing with the theatrical release of Saguni. It was further delayed after a lawsuit was filed against the makers, by filmmaker Ravi Devan, who claimed that the title bore a similarity to his film Kalla Thuppakki. This suit caused the film's promotional activities to be suspended. After Ravi Devan withdrew his case in early October, the first trailer was released in the same month on 10 October, and the second trailer on 26 October.

== Reception ==
=== Box office ===
On the opening day, Thuppakki netted around ₹18 crore (US$1.9 million) in Tamil Nadu box office. It collected a sum of ₹456 million (US$4.7 million) in Tamil Nadu, and ₹653 million (US$6.8 million) worldwide by its first week. In the UK and Ireland, Thuppakki grossed ₹1.85 crore after the fourth weekend. In Australia, it grossed A$80,264 (₹46,73,000) on six screens and the average per screen collection of the film stands out at A$1656 after two weeks. In Malaysia, it grossed $1,732,792 as of December 2012. Within 11 days of its release, the film reached the ₹1 billion (US$10 million) mark, and S. Saraswathi of Rediff.com believed it was the first Vijay film to do so. Its total domestic box office collections at the end of its run stood at ₹1.8 billion according to distributors Eros International. According to NDTV, the film's worldwide earnings were ₹121 crore.

=== Critical response ===
Thuppakki received mostly positive reviews from critics. L Romal M Singh of Daily News and Analysis stated that the film "is different. The difference is visible in every shot, every dialogue spoken and the amazing attention to detail. What stands out most in this incredibly entertaining film is that Tamil films have finally come of age – in so many interesting ways". Deccan Chronicle rated it 3.5 out of 5 and cited: "Thuppaki has come out as an action thriller that depends on mind games and smart plans rather than bloody fights. This is Murugados's film in its true sense and Vijay adds immense value to it by his performance". IANS named it a "well written Tamil film that engages the audience" and added that it had "the energy of Vijay and intellect of AR Murugadoss". Sify rated the film 4 out of 5 and stated that Murugadoss "has made a complete entertainer that blends with Vijay's mass image, thanks to his racy script", calling it a "perfect Diwali entertainer". Baradwaj Rangan wrote, "The narration is clean, uninterrupted by comedy (at least the intentional kind), and Murugadoss keeps guessing us throughout about Jagdish’s motives and methods. The only serious flaw is the mood-dampening track with Nisha (Kajal Agarwal).".

Sangeetha Devi Dundoo of The Hindu commented: "One of the first promos of the film, with snapshots of Mumbai, lurking terror, the antagonist threatening Vijay to which he responds 'I am waiting' went viral on social networks. The wait, clearly, has been worth it for the audience. And the man who's probably having the last laugh is Murugadoss". For the same newspaper, Karthik Subramaniam wrote, "One can only wonder just how much better Thuppakki would have been if it had done away with the song-and-dance-and-romance and such trappings." Haricharan Pudipeddi of The New Indian Express said, "Most of the characters are made to look dumb as Vijay steals all the attention. Kajal's role as a boxer, which she squanders with her clichéd performance, is definitely a turn off in the film. Jayaram and Sathyan, who're supposed to make us laugh, fail miserably in the process" and concluded, "In essence, "Thuppakki" has the energy of Vijay and intellect of A.R. Murugadoss".

J Hurtado of Screen Anarchy called the cinematography "astonishingly good" and added that, "Murugadoss and Vijay have never worked on a better-looking movie", but called the film "an enjoyable, though largely forgettable film". N. Venkateshwaran of The Times of India said, "Thuppakki will definitely be picked up by a big Bollywood star for a remake. For, the gun was bang on target". In contrast, Vivek Ramz from in.com rated it 3 out of 5 and said that it "doesn't meet the huge expectations it had created for itself", calling it "another regular commercial film which entertains in bits and pieces". Pavithra Srinivasan of Rediff.com rated the film 2.5 out of 5, saying "Vijay fans will find plenty to rejoice in this subdued avatar of their star, but audiences who seek intelligence in their movies will find it rather dull". S. Viswanath of Deccan Herald wrote, "While Vijay gives it all to live up to his fans' expectations, Kajal Aggarwal is just a pretty prop to pep up the proceedings. Despite boasting of ace cinematographer Santosh Sivan and Harris Jeyaraj as the music composer, this Thuppakki is not the Deepavali dhamaka it had promised with its promos". Ananda Vikatan rated the film 44 out of 100. In 2021, Nithisha Nanda Kumar of The Michigan Daily stated that "While it may have portrayed the story of an Indian officer well to some extent, Jagadish and Nisha's relationship felt extremely forced into the plot".

== Accolades ==
At the 60th Filmfare Awards South, Thuppakki was nominated for seven categories including Best Film, Best Director (Murugadoss) and Best Actor (Vijay), but did not win in any category. However, the film won four of ten nominations at the 2nd South Indian International Movie Awards: Best Actress – Critics for Aggarwal, Best Actor in a Negative Role for Jammwal, Best Music Director for Harris Jayaraj and Best Fight Choreographer for Kecha. The film as nominated at fifteen categories during the 7th Vijay Awards and won six awards, the highest in this ceremony. The awards were mostly from the favourite awards branch, which were: Favourite Film, Favourite Director (Murugadoss), Favourite Hero (Vijay), Favourite Heroine (Aggarwal) and Favourite Song (Google Google); Vijay further received an Entertainer of the Year award also for his work in Nanban. In addition, the film won an Ananda Vikatan Cinema Award, one CineMAA Award, one Chennai Times Film Award and three Edison Awards.

== Dubbed versions and remakes ==
Baba Yadav remade the film in Bengali as Game in 2014, and Murugadoss remade it in Hindi as Holiday: A Soldier Is Never Off Duty the same year. Despite the Hindi remake, Thuppakki was dubbed and released in the same language as Indian Soldier: Never On Holiday by Goldmines Telefilms in 2015.

== Legacy ==
The success of Thuppakki led to more collaborations between Murugadoss and Vijay, namely Kaththi (2014) and Sarkar (2018). The dialogue "I am waiting", spoken by Jagadish (Vijay) just before the interval, gained popularity and has since been used in the pre-interval scenes of other Indian films as well, particularly those starring Vijay. These include Kaththi, Theri (2016), Velainu Vandhutta Vellaikaaran (2016), Tamizh Padam 2 (2018), Sarkar, Master (2021), Varisu (2023), The Greatest of All Time (2024) and Good Bad Ugly (2025). The dialogue was also used in other films but not in the pre-interval portions such as Thalaivaa (2013), Pokkiri Simon (2017), Aavesham (2024) and Jaat (2025).
