= Surmukhi Raman =

Indian playback singer

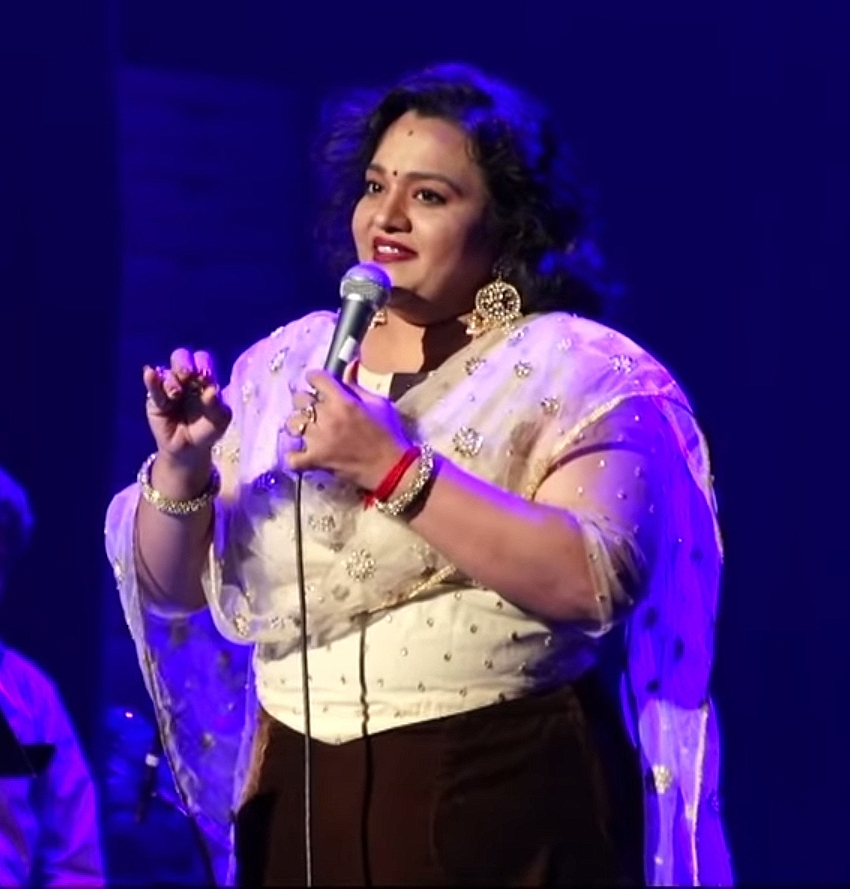
- Surmukhi Raman

Background information
- Born: Suchithra Raman; 15 September 1983 (age 43); Coimbatore, Tamil Nadu, India
- Occupations: Playback singer, Lyrics writer
- Instrument: Vocals
- Years active: 1997 – current

Surmukhi Raman (earlier called as Suchithra Raman), born on 15 September 1983 in Coimbatore, Tamil Nadu is an Indian playback singer from Tamil Nadu. She was brought up in Pune, Maharashtra. She occasionally writes lyrics. She is one of the emerging playback singers in South India. She has done playback for more than 150 film songs in four languages including Tamil, Telugu, Malayalam and Kannada. In addition, she has recorded a number of devotionals. She has performed in numerous concerts in India and abroad.

== Early life ==
Surmukhi Raman completed her primary education in Pune, Maharashtra and higher education at Vyasa Vidhyalaya Matric Higher Secondary School in Chennai, Tamil Nadu. She studied at University of Madras. Her father S.V. Ramanan, who had been a semi classical singer in All India Radio, Indore, Madhya Pradesh.

== Career ==
=== Singing career ===
Surmukhi's playback singing career started in 2007 and has spanned over 15years. She started singing Light music shows at the age of 14. B.H.Abdul Hameed advised her to make her voice recorded in a cassette to distribute to the music directors. She has sung the songs composed by all leading music directors in the film industry including Ilayaraja, A.R. Rahman, Hariharan, Bharadwaj, Vidhyasagar, Sharetth, Vijay Antony, Deva, Srikanth Deva, D. Imaan, Colonial Cousins, Jeevaraja, Vijayshankar, Taj Noor, Xavier, Manikanth Kadri, Rajini, Yuvan Shankar Raja, Ganesh Raghavendra, Nallathambi, and Shyam Balakrishnan. She has sung for more than 15 movies in Tamil and Telugu under the musical composition of Ilayaraja. Her famous hit songs include "Pothum Otha Sollu", "Chinna Paya Vayasu", and "Paruruvayaa". Her popular song "Aandipatti Kanava Kathu" from the Tamil "film Dharamadurai garnered 26 million views on YouTube." Also her another song "Peechey Peechey" from the movie Aranmanai is featured as one of the "most popular Tamil songs from the best artists" in the Tamil section of the Emirates Entertainment (In-Flight) Magazine, October 2016.

She is also a live stage performer who has performed more than 2000 orchestras.

=== Devotional albums ===
Surmukhi Raman has been performing solo devotional Bhajan, semi classical shows in North India almost every year for past 10 years. She has sung more than 500 devotional songs, encouraged by Mr.A.C. Dinakar, one of the senior most musicians in the industry. Her famous devotional albums include Siva Kavasam & Thirupallieluchi(2009),Yoga Narasimhar (2015), Murugane Mal Murugane (2011), Kanikai Thanthidum (2017) and Mera Sairam (2019).

=== Voice trainer ===
Apart from playback singing, she is also appeared among the panel of Judges in the singing reality shows. Official voice trainer for "Sun Singer" consecutively for 4 years.

== Discography ==
According to popular online media musical sources, the discography of Surmukhi Raman includes.

Year	Film	Language	Songs	Music director	Co-singers
2007	Pirappu	Tamil	Idhudhaana Kadhal Mazhai	Bharadwaj	Sathyan Mahalingam, Priya
2007	Pallikodam	Tamil	Rose Mary	Bharadwaj	Gana Ulaganathan
2007	Madurai Veeran	Tamil	Uyirum uyirum	Srikanth Deva	Ramesh & Senthildass Velayutham
2007	Naalaiya Pozhuthum Unnodu	Tamil	Yaarukitta thudhu solla	Srikanth Deva	Jaidev
2008	Subramaniapuram	Tamil	Madura Kulunga Kulunga	James Vasanthan	Velmurugan
2008	Thotta	Tamil	Saami Aduda	Srikanth Deva	Asit, Senthildass Velayutham
2008	Vallamai Tharayo	Tamil	Vallamai Tharayo	Bharadwaj	Bharadwaj
2008	Thiruvannamalai	Tamil	Amma Maare	Srikanth Deva	Pushpavanam Kuppusamy
2008	Thangam	Tamil	Chinna Chinna mukkuthi	Srikanth Deva	Senthildass Velayutham
2008	Nepali	Tamil	Hey Priya	Srikanth Deva	Karthik, Bombay Jayashri, Savitha
2008	Manjal Veiyil	Tamil	Malarudhu Malarudhu	Bharadwaj	Prasanna, Sathyan Mahalingam
2009	Perumal	Tamil	Yaen kedutha	Srikanth Deva	Benny Dayal
2009	Kannukulle	Tamil	Vaanam Padigal	Ilayaraja	Anitha, Priya
2009	Naalai Namadhe	Tamil	Naalai Namadhe	Bharadwaj	
2009	Kadhalukku Maranamillai	Tamil	Kadavule un kovilil	Bharadwaj	Ponethaal
2009	Modhi Vilayadu	Tamil	Chikki Mukki Chikki Mukhi	Colonial Cousins	Lesle Lewis
2009	A Aa E Ee	Tamil	Mena Minuki	Vijay Antony	Vijay Antony, Sangeetha Rajeshwaran, Suchitra
2009	Kasko	Telugu	Whistle Kottu	Premgi Amaren	Devi Sri Prasad
2010	Aasal	Tamil	Yea Dushyantha	Bharadwaj	Kumaran
2010	Aasal	Tamil	Kuthiraikku Theriyum	Bharadwaj	Sri Charan
2010	Mattram	Tamil	Yaaradhu Yaaradhu	Vijayshankar	Balram
2010	Ochayee	Tamil	Nochi kattu kadhavonnu	Jeevaraja	Sriram Parthasarathy
2010	Ochayee	Tamil	sonthamellam	Jeevaraja	
2010	Vamsam	Tamil	Marudhaani Poovapole	Taj Noor	Mukesh Mohamed
2010	Vamsam	Tamil	Usure	Taj Noor	
2010	Irandu Mugam	Tamil	Kannum Kannum	Bharadwaj	Karthik
2010	Puzhal	Tamil	Emmanase	Nallathambi	Karthik
2010	Puzhal	Tamil	Takkaru Takkaru Doi	Nallathambi	Naveen Madhav
2010	Sanikizhamai Saayangalam 5 Mani	Tamil	Thirudugirai Thirudugirai	Xavier	R. Prasanna
2011	Siruthai	Tamil	Chellam Vada Chellam	Vidhyasagar	Udit Narayan
2011	Avargalum Ivargalum	Tamil	Thedi Thedi	Srikanth Deva	
2011	Avargalum Ivargalum	Tamil	Para Para	Srikanth Deva	Karthik, Senthildass Velayutham, Renuka
2011	Sankarankovil	Tamil	Mudhan Mudhalaka	Rajini	Balaji
2011	Mudhal Idam	Tamil	Inga Vaanthey	D. Imaan	Haricharan
2011	Puli Vesham	Tamil	Top Glass	Srikanth Deva	M. L. R. Karthikeyan, Anitha, Srikanth Deva
2011	Mallukattu	Tamil	Maapillaiku Thozhan	Taj Noor	M. L. R. Karthikeyan, Malavika, Anjana Sowmya
2011	Raa Raa	Tamil	Anbum Aranum	Srikanth Deva	Harish Raghavendra
2011	Konjam Sirippu Konjam Kovam	Tamil	Kokilamma	Sunil Xavier	
2011	Konjam Sirippu Konjam Kovam	Tamil	En Edhire	Sunil Xavier	Tippu
2011	Maduve Mane	Kannada	Naxalittu Naanalla	Manikanth Kadri	Vijay Prakash
2011	Maduve Mane	Kannada	Idena	Manikanth Kadri	Manikanth Kadri
2011	Vaadamalli	Malayalam	Anuragam	Shyam Balakrishnan	K. K. Nishad
2011	Vaadamalli	Malayalam	Rapukalude	Shyam Balakrishnan	P. G. Ragesh
2011	Nandhi	Tamil	Vedhagosam muzangave	Bharadwaj	Bharadwaj, Mukesh Mohamed, Ananthu, M. L. R. Karthikeyan, Karpagam
2011	Nandhi	Tamil	Tanjore Thavil	Bharadwaj	Bharadwaj, Mukesh Mohamed, Ananthu, M. L. R. Karthikeyan, Karpagam
2012	Madhuvum Mythiliyum	Tamil	Bujju Kutti	Srikanth Deva	Srikanth Deva
2012	Vilayada Vaa	Tamil	Vanam Enthan	Srimurali	
2012	Manam Kothi Paravai	Tamil	Jal Jal Jal Oosai	D. Imaan	Aalap Raju
2012	Murattukaalai	Tamil	Dhavani	Srikanth Deva	
2012	Vachathi	Tamil	Sirumalligai	Jack Vathsan	Devi
2012	Muthal Thagaval Arikkai	Tamil	Un Athanum Naanthane	Ravi Raagav	Senthildass Velayutham
2012	Dhoni	Tamil	Endhaka née payanam	Ilayaraja	
2012	Panithuli	Tamil	Uyirin	Agnel Roman and Faisal	Jayadev
2012	Uu Kodathara? Ulikki Padathara?	Telugu	Hai Re Hai	Bobo Shashi	RanjithM. L. R. Karthikeyan, Senthil, Sam, Ramya, Deepa
2012	Prasad	Kannada	Ondu Aramane	Ilayaraja	Ilayaraja, Rita, Anitha
2013	Ananthapuram 1980	Telugu	Devudi Gudilo	James Vasanthan	Velmurugan
2013	Arya Surya	Tamil	Mama	Srikanth Deva	Gangai Amaran, Senthildass Velayutham, Belliraj, Mahathi, Hemambika
2014	Sooran	Tamil	Vaa Maa	P.B.Balaji	Vidyalakshmi, Rita
2014	Brahmaputra	Tamil	Koosum Theeye	Sunil Xavier	Prasanna
2014	Brahmaputra	Tamil	Kanmoodinal	Sunil Xavier	
2014	Aranmanai	Tamil	Peeche Peeche	Bharadwaj	M.M. Monissha, M. M. Manasi
2014	Aranmanai	Tamil	Katthi Parvakkari	Bharadwaj	Karthik
2014	Govindudu Andarivadele	Telugu	Bhavagare Choope	Yuvan Shankar Raja	Ranjith, Vijay Yesudas
2014	Yamaleela 2	Telugu	Alara Chanchalamaina	S. V. Krishna Reddy	
2014	Yamaleela 2	Telugu	Krishnam Bhaje	S. V. Krishna Reddy	M. L. R. Karthikeyan
2014	Drishya	Kannada	Ondu Kathe Kelu	Ilayaraja	Vijay Prakash, Pooja, Manasi
2015	Katham Katham	Tamil	Poda poda	Taj Noor	Velmurugan, Deepak
2015	Katham Katham	Tamil	Paakku Vetti	Taj Noor	Prabhu, N. M. Akthar
2015	Thunai Mudhalvar	Tamil	Kaasu Veesina	Jai	Rita
2015	Killadi	Tamil	Ekka Chakka	Srikanth Deva	
2015	Palakkattu Madhavan	Tamil	Kunnan Po	Srikanth Deva	
2015	Jippaa Jimikki	Tamil	Dolaare Dolaare	Ranib	
2015	Jippaa Jimikki	Tamil	Vennilaa Poloru	Ranib	V V Prasanna, Senthildass Velayutham
2015	Jippaa Jimikki	Tamil	Paraparannu Irukkudhaiya	Ranib	Mukesh Mohamed
2016	Kida Poosari Magudi	Tamil	Chinna Paya Vayasu	Ilayaraja	Suraj
2016	Tharai Thappattai	Tamil	Paruruvaaya	Ilayaraja	Sathya Prakash
2016	Dharamadurai	Tamil	Aandipatti	Yuvan Shankar Raja	Senthildass Velayutham
2016	Amma Kanakku	Tamil	Kanavugal	Ilayaraja	
2016	Nayyapudai	Tamil	Idhu pol Oru Sugam	Taj Noor	Yazin Nizar
2016	Gilli Bambaram Goli	Tamil	Engo Poguthu kaal	YR Prasad	
2017	Aakkam	Tamil	Solla Solla	Srikanth Deva	
2017	Yeidhavan	Tamil	Singari Chennakari	Paartav Barggo	
2017	Yevanavan	Tamil	Idhu Enna Mayamo	Fedo Pete	Kumaran
2017	Kalathur Gramam	Tamil	Kanna Unnai	Ilaiyaraja	
2018	Dhisai	Tamil	Madarasu Ponnuku	Bharadwaj	Sathyan Mahalingam
2018	Dhisai	Tamil	Idhu Aasai Pookkum	Bharadwaj	Bharadwaj
2018	Dhisai	Tamil	Kanna Kanna	Bharadwaj	Bharadwaj
2018	Genius	Tamil	Velaiyadu Magane	Yuvan Shankar Raja	Senthildass Velayutham, Sam, Pawan, Priya Himesh, Sri Varthini
2018	Eghantham	Tamil	Mullaiya kelu malliya	Ganesh Raghavendra	
2018	Eghantham	Tamil	Mullaiya kelu malliya	Ganesh Raghavendra	
2018	Maniyaar Kudumbam	Tamil	En manasukulla	Thambi Ramaiah	D. Imaan
2018	Poya Velaya Pathukittu	Tamil	Aayiram Jenmam	Sri Sai Sasi	Senthildass Velayutham
2019	Vinaya Vidheya Rama	Tamil	Thassadiyya	Devi Sri Prasad	Yazin Nizar
2019	Vinaya Vidheya Rama	Tamil	Rama Loves Sita	Devi Sri Prasad	Jagadish
2019	Maharshi	Telugu	Choti Choti Baatein	Devi Sri Prasad	Devi Sri Prasad, Ranina Reddy, Anitha, Roshini
2019	Maharshi	Telugu	Nuvve Samastham	Devi Sri Prasad	Yazin Nizar, Ranina Reddy
2019	Kurukshetra	Tamil	Guru Kulathai	V. Harikrishna	
2021	Jagame Thandhiram	Malayalam	Rakita Rakita	Santhosh Narayanan	Renjith Unni, Sannidhanandan
2021	Kurup	Tamil	Kaar Kaala Velai	Sushin Shyam	
2021	Kurup	Kannada	Aledaata Kaata Tikkaata	Sushin Shyam	
2021	Kurup	Hindi	Mujhe Aa Bharle	Sushin Shyam	
2021	Kurup	Telugu	Anuvynakaalam	Sushin Shyam	

== Television Title Songs ==
- Mahalakshmi – 2017

== Theme musical composition ==
Surmukhi Raman composed the theme music for Kanmani along with Sathyan Mahalingam and Regina.
