= Saindhavi =

Indian carnatic vocalist and playback singer (born 1989)

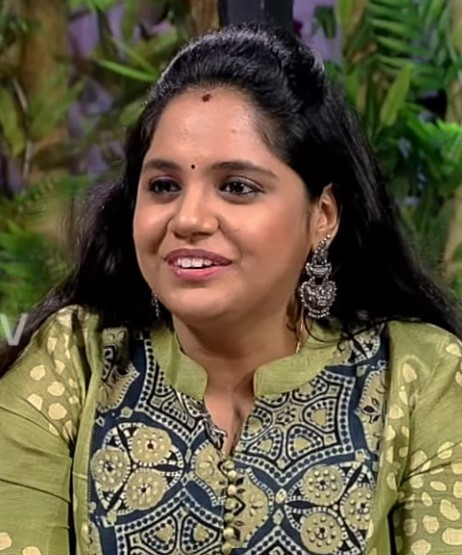
- Born: Saindhavi Srivatsan; 3 January 1989 (age 37); Chennai, Tamil Nadu, India
- Spouse: G. V. Prakash Kumar (m. 2013; div. 2025)
- Children: 1
- Musical career
- Genres: Playback singer
- Occupations: Playback singer; carnatic music; vocalist
- Years active: 2001–present

Saindhavi (born 3 January 1989) is an Indian Carnatic vocalist and playback singer. She has been performing since the age of 12.

== Personal life ==
Saindhavi married her schoolmate, composer G. V. Prakash Kumar, on 27 June 2013, in Chennai, India. They were in a relationship for 12 years before their wedding. The couple have a daughter. They announced their separation on 13 May 2024, after 11 years of marriage, and were granted divorce on 30 September 2025.

== Discography ==
=== Tamil songs ===
Some of Saindhavi's Tamil film songs are listed here.

Year	Film	Song	Music Director	Co - artist	Notes
2005	Anniyan	"Andangaka Kondakari"	Harris Jayaraj	Jassie Gift, Shreya Ghoshal, KK	
2005	Thotti Jaya	"Achuvellam"	Harris Jayaraj	Shankar Mahadevan, Ranjith	
2005	ABCD	"Manjal Mugame"	D. Imman		
2005	Padhavi Paduthum Paadu	"Rendu"	Gandhidasan	Prasanna	
2005	Selvam	"Thitathae Pesathae"	Deva		
2005	Aanai	"Figurudan Oru Naal"	D. Imman	Karthik	
2006	Saravana	"Kadhal Vandhum"	Srikanth Deva	V. V. Prasanna	
2006	Pattiyal	"Poga Poga Bhoomi Virikirathe"	Yuvan Shankar Raja	Haricharan, Vijay Yesudas, Harini Sudhakar	
2006	Paramasivan	"Kannan Manivannan"	Vidyasagar	Kalyani Menon, Lakshmi Rangarajan	
2006	Aathi	"Yea Durra"	Vidyasagar	Tippu	
2006	Varalaru	"Innisai"	A. R. Rahman	Mahathi, Naresh Iyer	
2006	Thambi	"Enn Kadhal"	Vidyasagar		
2006	Sudesi	"Senthamil Naadu"	Srikanth Deva	Priya, Vidya	
2006	Unarchigal	"Poomaalaiyo"	R. K. Sundar		
2006	Imsai Arasan 23rd Pulikecei	"Aah Aadivaa"	Sabesh–Murali	Manikka Vinayagam, Binny Krishnakumar, Kovai Kamala, Vadivelu	
2006	Sengathu	"Kundhal Paravai"	Arafin Yusuf	Prasanna	
2006	Sivappathigaram	"Poranthiruchi Kalam"	Vidyasagar	T. K. Kala, Ganga, Jayamoorthy, Mahalingham	
2006	Nenjirukkum Varai	"Kichu Kichu Moottadhada"	Srikanth Deva	Udit Narayan	
2006	Thirudi	"Vizhigal Randum"	Bharani	Harish Raghavendra	
2007	Azhagiya Tamil Magan	"Kelamal Kaiyile"	A. R. Rahman	Sriram Parthasarathy	
2007	Azhagiya Tamil Magan	"Maduraikku Pogathadee"	A. R. Rahman	Archit, Benny Dayal, Dharshana KT	
2007	Kannamoochi Yenada	"Kannamoochi Aatam"	Yuvan Shankar Raja	Palakkad Sreeram, Prasanna, Dr. Narayanan	
2007	Kaanal Neer	"Chella Chella"	Suresh-Bobby	Tippu, Vijay Yesudas	
2007	Kaanal Neer	"Enakena Pirantha"	Suresh-Bobby	Vijay Yesudas	
2007	Ninaithu Ninaithu Parthen	"Aandipatti Party"	Joshua Sridhar	Sukhwinder Singh, Haricharan, Premgi Amaren	
2007	Paali	"Theye Theye"	Bhagwat		
2007	Thee Nagar	"Oothu Oothuda"	Jassie Gift	Naveen, Anupama	
2007	Thottal Poo Malarum	"Kadatharan Naan Unnai"	Yuvan Shankar Raja	Rahul Nambiar	
2007	Aarya	"Chile"	Mani Sharma	Naveen	
2007	Tholaipesi	"En Pagaivan"	S. Shanthakumar		
2008	Pirivom Santhippom	"Iru Vizhiyo"	Vidyasagar	Vineeth Srinivasan	
2008	Thangam	"Othakathu"	Srikanth Deva	Karthik	
2008	Valluvan Vasuki	"Thamarapoo"	S. A. Rajkumar		
2008	Thozha	"Kaadhal Devathai"	Premgi Amaren	Haricharan	
2008	Ini Varum Kaalam	"Lukku Vida Likka Vida"	Bharani	Prasanna	
2008	Chakkara Viyugam	"Yei... Unnidam"	Karthik Raja		
2008	Kathavarayan	"Ponguppa Ponguppa"	Srikanth Deva	Naveen	
2008	Uliyin Osai	"Alaiyellam Chozhavala"	Ilaiyaraaja	Ilaiyaraaja, Rita, Madhu Balakrishnan	
2008	Mahesh, Saranya Matrum Palar	"En Padal"	Vidyasagar		
2009	Padikkathavan	"Appa Amma Vilayattu"	Mani Sharma	Ranjith	
2009	Thoranai	"Manjasela Mandakini"	Mani Sharma	Tippu	
2009	Thiru Thiru Thuru Thuru	"Jillenu Veesum"	Mani Sharma	Haricharan	
2009	Thiru Thiru Thuru Thuru	"TTTT Theme Song"	Mani Sharma	Ranjith	
2009	Adada Enna Azhagu	"Deepavali"	T. M. Jayamurugan & Jeevan Thomas	Mano, Harish Raghavendra, Mukesh Mohamed, Kalyani, Anuradha Sriram	
2009	Ilampuyal	"Vaa Vaa En Anbae"	Vashanth Sellathurai	Ananth	
2009	Mayandi Kudumbathar	"Mudhal Mazhaye"	Sabesh–Murali	Balram	
2009	Sirithal Rasipen	"Aagayame Ingu Vanthu"	Iniyavan	Karthik	
2009	Pudhiya Payanam	"Muthal Murai"	Prasad Ganesh	Krish	
2009	Engal Aasan	"Ennai Enna"	Sabesh–Murali		
2009	Malai Malai	"O Maare"	Mani Sharma	Ranjith	
2010	Paiyaa	"Adada Mazhaida"	Yuvan Shankar Raja	Rahul Nambiar	Edison Award for Best Female Playback Singer
2010	Sura	"Thanjavoor Jillakkari"	Mani Sharma	Hemachandra	
2010	Madharasapattinam	"Aaruyire Aaruyire"	G. V. Prakash Kumar	Sonu Nigam	
2010	Uthama Puthiran	"En Nenju"	Vijay Antony	Vijay Prakash	
2010	Maanja Velu	"Oh My Dear"	Mani Sharma	Ranjith	
2010	Magane En Marumagane	"Muruga Velmuruga"	Dhina		
2010	Thittakudi	"Otha Usurukulla"	Selvanambi		
2010	Thambi Arjuna	"Mazhai Megam Mazhai"	Dhina	Unni Menon, Prasanna, Dhina	
2010	Gowravargal	"Aaha Soka Vachan"	Dhina	Harish Raghavendra	
2010	Gowravargal	"Nesama Ninacha" (I)	Dhina		
2010	Gowravargal	"Thaaiya Pola"	Dhina	Srimathumitha	
2010	Vallakottai	"Magadheera" (II)	Dhina	Udit Narayan	
2010	Nellu	"Kannakkol Thiruda"	S. S. Kumaran	Silambarasan	
2011	Mappillai	"Ready Readya"	Mani Sharma	Ranjith	
2011	Mappillai	"Onnu Rendu"	Mani Sharma	Mukesh Mohamed	
2011	Arumbu Meesai Kurumbu Paarvai	"Idupazhagi O Maame"	Mohammed Rizwan	Ajeesh Ashok	
2011	Singam Puli	"Varrale"	Mani Sharma	Ranjith	
2011	Deiva Thirumagal	"Vizhigalil Oru Vaanavil"	G. V. Prakash Kumar		
2011	Vedi	"Ippadi Mazhai Adithaal"	Vijay Antony	Karthik	
2011	Mayakkam Enna	"Pirai Thedum"	G. V. Prakash Kumar	G. V. Prakash Kumar	Mirchi Music Award for Female Vocalist of the Year; Vijay Music Award for Popular duet of the year
2011	Mayakkam Enna	"Naan Sonnadhum Mazhaivandhucha"	G. V. Prakash Kumar	Naresh Iyer	
2011	Minsaram	"Anantha Deepam"	T. Devan	Ranjith	
2011	Narthagi	"The Destiny"	G. V. Prakash Kumar	Naresh Iyer	
2011	Eththan	"Mazhaiyudhir Kaalam"	Taj Noor	Vijay Yesudas	
2012	Vettai	"Thaiya Thaka"	Yuvan Shankar Raja	Harini	
2012	Saguni	"Manasellam Mazhaiye"	G. V. Prakash Kumar	Sonu Nigam, G. V. Prakash Kumar	
2012	Sundarapandian	"Nenjukkulle"	N. R. Raghunanthan		
2012	Thaandavam	"Uyirin Uyire"	G. V. Prakash Kumar	D. Sathyaprakash, G. V. Prakash Kumar	SIIMA Award for Best Female Playback Singer
2012	Medhai	"Annai Oru Kuzhandhai"	Dhina	K. J. Yesudas	
2012	Medhai	"Uyirile Deepam Ondru"	Dhina	Benny Dayal	
2012	Maasi	"Naan Paartha"	Dhina	Shankar Mahadevan	
2012	Thiruthani	"Nee Enakku Nee Enakku"	Perarasu	Karthik	
2012	Neerparavai	"Devan Magale"	N. R. Raghunanthan	V. V. Prasanna	
2013	Sundattam	"Kadhal Varum Varai"	Britto Michael		
2013	Udhayam NH4	"Yaaro Ivan"	G. V. Prakash Kumar		Edison Award for Best Female Playback Singer
2013	Thalaivaa	"Yaar Intha Saalai"	G. V. Prakash Kumar		
2013	Naan Rajavaga Pogiren	"Yaarivano"	G. V. Prakash Kumar		
2013	Raja Rani	"Nee Yaaro Yaaro"	G. V. Prakash Kumar		
2013	Theeya Velai Seiyyanum Kumaru	"Thiruttu Pasanga"	C. Sathya	Ranina Reddy, Dr. Narayanan	
2014	Thegidi	"Vinmeen Vithayil"	Nivas K. Prasanna	Abhay Jodhpurkar	
2014	Marumugam	"Kuru Kuru Kannale"	Agastya		
2014	Naan Sigappu Manithan	"Idhayam unnai Theduthe"	G. V. Prakash Kumar		
2014	Kathai Thiraikathai Vasanam Iyakkam	"Pen Maegam Polavae"	Sharreth	G. V. Prakash Kumar	
2014	Poriyaalan	"Kan Rendum"	M. S. Jones Rupert	G. V. Prakash Kumar	
2014	Kappal	"Kadhal Cassatta"	Natarajan Sankaran	D. Sathyaprakash	
2014	Pulivaal	"Neelangarayil"	N. R. Raghunanthan	Karthik	
2014	Kurai Ondrum Illai	"Ellai Ilam Kizhiye"	Ramanujan Mk	Andazh	
2014	Nimirndhu Nil	"Negizhiyinil"	G. V. Prakash Kumar	Haricharan	
2014	Ennamo Nadakkudhu	"Meesa Kokkudhan"	Premgi Amaren	Vijay Yesudas, Saranya Ponvannan	
2014	Jaihind 2	"Adada Nenjil Adada"	Arjun Janya	Karthik	
2014	Gnana Kirukkan	"Madura Marikkozhundhe"	Taj Noor	Haricharan	
2015	Sandamarutham	"Paarthu Kondae"	James Vasanthan	D. Sathyaprakash	
2015	Rajathandhiram	"Yenn Indha Paarvaigal"	G. V. Prakash Kumar		
2015	Idhu Enna Maayam	"Iravaga Nee"	G. V. Prakash Kumar		
2015	JK Enum Nanbanin Vaazhkai	"Nee Enna Pesuvai"	G. V. Prakash Kumar		
2015	Trisha Illana Nayanthara	"Yennachu Yedhachu"	G. V. Prakash Kumar	G. V. Prakash Kumar, Kalyani Pradeep	
2015	Katham Katham	"Idhu Enna"	Taj Noor	Yazin Nizar	
2015	Thakka Thakka	"Saaral Mazhai"	Jakes Bejoy	Abhay	
2015	Maanga	"Vedakozhi"	Premgi Amaren	Naveen	
2016	Sethupathi	"Hawa Hawa"	Nivas K. Prasanna	Karthik	
2016	Uyire Uyire	"Devadhai Paarkiral"	Aravind–Shankar	Hariharan	
2016	Theri	"En Jeevan"	G. V. Prakash Kumar	Hariharan, Vaikom Vijayalakshmi	
2016	Theri	"En Jeevan" (film version)	G. V. Prakash Kumar	G. V. Prakash Kumar, Vaikom Vijayalakshmi	
2016	Bayam Oru Payanam	"Maayavi Penne"	Y. R. Prasad	Haricharan	
2016	Sandikuthirai	"Nee Oru"	Varashree	V. V. Prasanna	
2017	Enbathettu	"Kaalakkaalin"	Thayarathnam		
2017	Paakanum Pola Irukku	"Manjapoove"	Aruldev		
2018	Lakshmi	"Aala Aala"	Sam C. S.	G. V. Prakash Kumar	
2018	Lakshmi	"Dreamy Chellamma"	Sam C. S.		
2018	Merlin	"Aagaya Nilave"	Ganesh Raghavendra		
2018	Yenda Thalaiyila Yenna Vekkala	"Imaikkamal Kangal"	A. R. Reihana	Abhay Jodhpurkar	
2019	Asuran	"Ellu Vaya Pookalaye"	G. V. Prakash Kumar		Ananda Vikatan Cinema Award for Best Female Playback Singer; SIIMA Award for Best Female Playback Singer
2019	Butler Balu	"Thaira Thaira"	Ganesh Raghavendra		
2020	World Famous Lover	"My Love"	Gopi Sundar	Sarath Santhosh	
2020	Ponmagal Vandhal	"Vaanamai Naan"	Govind Vasantha		
2020	Varmaa	"Sumanasa Vanditha"	Radhan		
2020	Soorarai Pottru	"Kayilae Aagasam"	G. V. Prakash Kumar		
2020	Kombu	"Arugilae Nindru Kolgirai"	Devguru	Santosh Hariharan	
2020	Kombu	"Tightu Macaan"	Devguru	Velmurugan	
2021	Pei Irukka Bayamen	"Vaanavillin Vannam Alli"	Jose Franklin		
2021	Thalaivii	"Mazhai Mazhai"	G. V. Prakash Kumar		
2021	Thalaivii	"Kannum Kannum Pesa Pesa"	G. V. Prakash Kumar		
2021	Thalli Pogathey	‌"Enna Thavam Seithen"	Gopi Sunder	D. Sathyaprakash	
2021	Jail	‌"Boomikku Nee Vandha"	Ravi G		
2021	Sangathalaivan	"Pudhu Vidha"	Robert Sargunam		
2021	Thaen	"Usuraye Ulukkudhe"	Sanath Bharathwaj		
2021	Endraavathu Oru Naal	"Kanne En"	N. R. Raghunanthan	Vijay Yesudas	
2022	Anbarivu	"Kannirendum"	Hiphop Tamizha		
2022	Yaanai	"Ganapathy Saranam" ‌	G. V. Prakash Kumar		
2022	Yaanai	"Deiva Magale"	G. V. Prakash Kumar		
2022	Bestie	"Ragasiya Rana"	J. V.		
2022	Irumban	"Un Vellandhiyu Azhagu Dhaan"	Srikanth Deva	G. V. Prakash Kumar	
2022	Mathimaran	"Kaththi Koovudhu Kadhal"	Karthik Raja	G. V. Prakash Kumar	
2022	Yugi	"Kadavul Thantha"	Ranjin Raj	Pradeep Kumar	
2022	Gatta Kusthi	"Maranthana"	Justin Prabhakaran		
2023	Naan Kadavul Illai	"Kanne En Kanmaniye"	Siddharth Vipin	S. A. Chandrasekhar	
2023	Jawan	"Eeram Theme"	Anirudh Ravichander	Vaikom Vijayalakshmi	
2023	Mark Antony	"Amma Ennum Mandhiramey"	G. V. Prakash Kumar		
2023	Kathar Basha Endra Muthuramalingam	"Yengaamal Ettu Vai"	G. V. Prakash Kumar		
2023	Karumegangal Kalaigindrana	"Suththamulla Nenjam"	G. V. Prakash Kumar		
2023	Karumegangal Kalaigindrana	"Megangal"	G. V. Prakash Kumar		
2023	Thee Ivan	"Enga Solli Ketpathu"	Jayamurugan Muthusamy		
2023	Mathimaran	"Kaththi Koovudhu Kadhal"	Karthik Raja	G. V. Prakash Kumar	
2024	Guardian	"Thiraikadal"	Sam C. S.		
2024	Kozhipannai Chelladurai	"Ponnana Pottapulla"	N. R. Raghunanthan	Anand Aravindakshan	
2024	Dear	"Kannadi Nilave"	G. V. Prakash Kumar	Ajay S Khashyap	
2024	Dear	"Nenjodu Nee (Female Version)"	G. V. Prakash Kumar		
2024	Sir	"Panangarukka"	Siddhu Kumar	G. V. Prakash Kumar	
2024	Amaran	"Kanave"	G. V. Prakash Kumar		
2025	Vanangaan	“Mugilin Mele”	G. V. Prakash Kumar		
2025	Baby and Baby	"Aaraa Amuthey"	D. Imman		
2025	Varunan	"Kaadhale"	BoBo Shashi	G. V. Prakash Kumar	
2025	Naangal	"Kanavae"	Ved Shanker Sugavanam		
2025	Tourist Family	"Mugai Mazhai"	Sean Roldan		Lyrics by Mohan Rajan
2025	Nizharkudai	"Kanne Kanmaniye"	Naren Balakumar		
2025	Paramasivan Fathima	"Oru Thalatu"	Deepan Chakravarthy	Sreekanth Hariharan	
2025	Phoenix	"O Thangalaye"	Sam C. S.		
2025	Mrs & Mr	"Subha Muhurtham"	Srikanth Deva		
2025	Kumaara Sambavam	"Idhu Devadhai Nerame"	Achu Rajamani	Haricharan	
2025	Padaiyaanda Maaveeraa	"Veera Padaiyaanda Veera"	G. V. Prakash Kumar		
2026	Parasakthi	"Muthaarame"	G. V. Prakash Kumar	G. V. Prakash Kumar	Lyrics by Jayashree Mathimaran, Ramajogayya Sastry
2026	Kara	"Thaazham Poove"	G. V. Prakash Kumar	G. V. Prakash Kumar	Lyrics by Uma Devi

=== Tamil album songs ===
Year	album	Song	Music Director	Produced by	Language	Notes
2016	Vanothan's Album	"Thavikkiren"	G.Saitharsan			
2020	Sandham- Symphony Meets Classical Tamil	"KalamSei Kove"	Raleigh Rajan			Album that featured in Amazon Top#10 International Music Category
2022	1 MinMusic	"Heartu Beatu"	Saindhavi			Album for Instagram reals
2024	Kanavellam Un Maayam	"Kanavellam Un Maayam"	Sajith MX	Vasanth Ramasamy	Tamil	Album for Giant Music India
2025	Kan Imaikaiyil	"Kan Imaikaiyil"	Sri Krish	Vasanth Ramasamy	Tamil	Album for Giant Music India

=== Telugu songs ===
Year	Film	Song title	Composer
2003	Gangotri	"Railu Bandi"	M. M. Keeravani
2005	Vennela	"Bhagyam Podduna"	Mahesh Mahadevan
2005	Vennela	"Super Model"	Mahesh Mahadevan
2005	Vennela	"Nela Thakani"	Mahesh Mahadevan
2005	Vennela	"Chesthara Love"	Mahesh Mahadevan
2007	Don	"Mudde Pettu"	Raghava Lawrence
2009	Avakai Biryani	"Mamidi Kommaki"	Manikanth Kadri
2009	Parugu	"Yelagelaga"	Mani Sharma
2009	Kasko	"Nachave"	Premgi Amaren
2009	Sasirekha Parinayam	"Yedho Yedho"	Vidyasagar
2009	Sasirekha Parinayam	"Yedho Yedho II"	Vidyasagar
2009	Baanam	"Naalo Nenena"	Mani Sharma
2010	Prasthanam	"Murali Lola"	Mahesh Shankar
2010	Awaara (D)	"Arere Vaana"	Yuvan Shankar Raja
2010	Khaleja	"Makathika"	Mani Sharma
2011	Nanna (D)	"Veliginadoka Vanavill"	G. V. Prakash Kumar
2011	Shakti	"Prema Desam"	Mani Sharma
2012	Ishq	"Sutiga Choodaku"	Anoop Rubens
2012	Lovely	"Lovely Lovely"	Anoop Rubens
2014	Jaihind 2	"Manasa Nee Madhurima"	Arjun Janya
2014	Janda Pai Kapiraju	"Telisinadhi"	G. V. Prakash Kumar
2016	Policeodu (D)	"Kannulo Vunnavu"	G. V. Prakash Kumar
2023	Aakaasam Nee Haddhu Ra (D)	"Andani Aakaasam"	G. V. Prakash Kumar
2024	Baak (D)	"Jo Jo"	Hiphop Tamizha
2024	Siddharth Roy	"Kathalo Kathe"	Radhan
2026	Parasakthi (D)	"Thaaraamani"	G. V. Prakash Kumar

=== Kannada songs ===
Year	Song title	Film	Composer	Notes
2008	"Mussanje Rangalli"	Psycho	Raghu Dixit	
2008	"Beladingalate Minu Minuguta"	Psycho	Raghu Dixit	
2010	"Chalisuva Cheluve"	Ullasa Utsaha	G. V. Prakash Kumar	Uncredited
2014	"Hriva Ninna Naguva"	Abhimanyu	Arjun Janya	
2022	"Matte Nodabeda"	Ek Love Ya	Arjun Janya	

=== Malayalam songs ===
Year	Song title	Film	Composer
2025	Swasamey Swasamey	4 Seasons	Raleigh Rajan

=== Television ===
She has sung title songs for the TV series Idhu Oru Kaadhal Kadhai, Chellamay Chellam and Magalir Mattum. She is also one of the lead vocalists in the popular series of albums Sacred Chants by Kosmic Music. Her devotional album on Lord Krishna titled "Alilayil Urangukinra Mayakkannane" was released in 2012 by Gaananjali Recordings.

Year	Series	Song	Composer(s)	Writer(s)	Co-artist(s)	Television
2007	Athipookal	"Ari Aro Uravugale"	X.Paulraj	Dr.Kiruthiya		Sun TV
2010	Mundhanai Mudichu	"Mundhanai Selai"		Vairamuthu		Sun TV
2012	Valli	"Kaalam Oru Nathiyena"	X.Paulraj	Dr.Kiruthiya		Sun TV
2019	Tamil Selvi	"Anbumanam Kondaval"				Sun TV
2021	Thalattu	"Thalattu Thalattu"				Sun TV
2022	Kanaa	"Kannala Vaal Edukura"				Zee Tamil
2023	Meena	"Poove Kadhai Pesalaamaa"	Ajesh	Snehan		Sun TV
2023	Singapennae	"Singa Penne Vaa"		Palani Bharathi		Sun TV
2024	Thayamma Kudumbathaar	"Thayamma"	C. Sathya			DD Tamil
2024	Lakshmi	"Penne Pinmaykkoru"				Sun TV
2025	Thanga Meengal	"Veetukkaran Oorukku Illai"				Sun TV
2024	Thulasi	"Settai Vachu Nenjikulle Aasiya Thedi"				

== Television ==
Year	Title	Role	Network
2023	Sa Re Ga Ma Pa Li'l Champs 3	Judge	Zee Tamil
2024	Sa Re Ga Ma Pa Seniors 4	Judge	Zee Tamil
2024	Sa Re Ga Ma Pa Li'l Champs 4	Judge	Zee Tamil
2025	Sa Re Ga Ma Pa Seniors 5	Guest Judge	Zee Tamil
2025	Sa Re Ga Ma Pa Li'l Champs 5	Judge	Zee Tamil
