= Mukesh Mohamed =

Indian Tamil-language playback singer

- Born: P. A. Peer Mohamed; 6 July 1980 (age 46); Chennai, Tamil Nadu, India
- Occupation: Playback singer
- Instrument: Vocals
- Years active: 1995 – current

Mukesh Mohamed (formerly known as Mukesh; born 6 July 1980) is an Indian playback singer. As a singer, he sings melody, folk and gana songs. He has sung more than 500 film songs in various Indian languages. He has also recorded a number of devotional albums. He has performed in numerous live concerts across the world, and has regular appearance in Ilaiyaraaja’s musical orchestras. Mukesh Mohamed has sung some songs including "Vaa Saamy" in Annatthe.

== Early life ==
Mukesh Mohamed was born P. A. Peer Mohamed in Chennai, Tamil Nadu. His parents are from Seythunganallur village, Tirunelveli district, Tamil Nadu. He was actively participating in singing competitions during his school days. His teacher had foreseen his future in music, and advised him to enter into film industry. Mukesh Mohamed was determined to make a career in the film industry as it was his passion since his childhood. His father, N.P. Abdul Kadar, who was also a musician, trained Mukesh Mohamed to sing some of the toughest classical songs sung by the legendary playback singers including K. B. Sundarambal, T. R. Mahalingam, T. M. Soundararajan and Sirkazhi Govindarajan, and encouraged him to learn music properly. Mukesh Mohamed, then, started learning music from Dinakaran, a music composer, who changed his name to Mukesh.

== Singing career ==
Mukesh Mohamed started his singing career in Dinakaran's musical orchestra. In the beginning, he used to sing a number of popular Tamil devotional songs. He later participated in different musical competitions organised by TV channels. In 2002, he was adjudged as the best singer of the year for "Raja Geetham", a musical competition conducted by Raj TV, and received the award in the presence of legendary musicians including M. S. Viswanathan, S. P. Balasubrahmanyam and A. R. Rahman. This reward gave him an entry to film industry. Mukesh Mohamed's debut in playback singing was for the song "Thee Kuriviyai" in the 2004 Tamil film Kangalal Kaidhu Sei. A. R. Rahman composed the music. He has sung a number of songs for many popular music directors including Ilaiyaraaja, Srikanth Deva, Bharadwaj, Devi Sri Prasad, D. Imman, Harris Jayaraj, Sirpy, Karthik Raja, Kannan and Yuvan Shankar Raja. Some of Mukesh Mohamed's hit songs include "Enn Theivathaikku" (Sivakasi), "Love Letter" (Kanna Laddu Thinna Aasaiya), “Azhage Azhage” (Oru Kal Oru Kannadi) and Kacheri Kacheri (Kacheri Arambam). He is popularly known for his singing of “Ullathil Nalla Ullam”, a song from the 1964 Tamil movie Karnan in live orchestras across the world.

== Discography ==
The discography of Mukesh Mohamed includes:

=== Tamil songs ===
Year	Film	Songs	Music director	Co-singers
2004	Kangalal Kaidhu Sei	Thee Kuriviyai	A. R. Rahman	Johnson, Harini
2005	Selvam	Ennai Sathiyama	Deva	
2005	Vetrivel Sakthivel	Madhura Karichi	Srikanth Deva	Srileka
2005	Sivakasi	Enn Theivathaikku	Srikanth Deva	
2005	Aaru	Soda Bottle	Devi Sri Prasad	Shankar Mahadevan
2005	Aaru	Freeya Vudu	Devi Sri Prasad	Jassie Gift, Vadivelu, M. L. R. Karthikeyan, Grace Karunas
2005	Bambara Kannaley	En Kadhalum Kadha	Srikanth Deva	Reshmi
2005	Bambara Kannaley	Mana Magale	Srikanth Deva	Sriram Parthasarathy, Roshini
2006	Kodambakkam	Oh! Pappa Oh! Pappa	Sirpy	Jassie Gift
2006	Vattaram	Ovvoru Pillaiyum	Bharadwaj	
2006	Thiruttu Payale	Thiruttu Payale	Bharadwaj	
2006	Idhaya Thirudan	Urikka Urikka	Bharadwaj	Ceylon Manohar
2006	Thagapansamy	Aararo Aariraro	Srikanth Deva	
2006	Thagapansamy	Semparuthi	Srikanth Deva	
2006	Thagapansamy	Porantha Manula	Srikanth Deva	
2007	Vettai Aarampam	Pattai Katikitu	EM. Ramamoorthi	Reshmiravi
2007	Kanna	Sembaruthi	Ranjit Barot	Manikka Vinayagam, Vinaya
2007	Muni	Varranda Muni	Bharadwaj	
2008	Dharmapuri	Karuthamachan	Srikanth Deva	Reshmi
2008	Pazhani	Thaayai Polathaan	Srikanth Deva	
2008	Silambattam	Where Is The Party	Yuvan Shankar Raja	Priyadharshini
2008	Vannathupoochi	Eai Vangadaa	Rehan	
2009	Vanam Partha Seemayile	Thaayi Oru Boomidaa	Srikanth Deva	
2009	Kannukulle	Paattu Ketka	Ilaiyaraaja	Velmurugan, Bhavatharini
2009	Madurai Ponnu Chennai Paiyan	Kalaikalama	Kanmani Raja	Sri Vardhini
2009	Adada Enna Azhagu	Deepavali	Jeevan Thomas	Saindhavi , Kalyani, Anuradha Sriram, Harish Raghavendra
2009	Adada Enna Azhagu	Theeratha	Jeevan Thomas	Suchitra
2009	Maasilamani	Odi Odi Vilayadu	D. Imman	Emcee Jesz, SuVi
2009	Naai Kutty	Adichi Potta	Vijayabharathi	
2009	Eesa	Aagayam Idi Muzhanga	Haran	Periya Karuppu Thevar
2010	Tamizh Padam	Pacha Manja	Kannan	
2010	Thambikku Indha Ooru	Thambikku Indha Ooru	Dharan	Benny Dayal
2010	Oru Koodai Mutham	Kokko Kokko	Shanthan	Srimathumitha
2010	Munnavar	Purushan Veetil	Nandhaji	
2010	Kutty	Nee Kadhalikkum Ponnu	Devi Sri Prasad	
2010	Kutty	Kannu Rendum	Devi Sri Prasad	Priya Himesh
2010	Munnavar	Adi Nenjil Siraku Mulaikha	Nandhaji	Roshini
2010	Oru Koodai Mutham	Majakka Majakka	Shanthan	Sathyan, Narayanan
2010	Kacheri Arambam	Kacheri Kacheri	D. Imman	Madhushree
2010	Aasal	Tottodaing	Bharadwaj	Janani
2010	Sura	Vettri Kodi Yeathu	Mani Sharma	Ranjith
2010	Kanimozhi	Yaaro Ival Ival	Satish Chakravarthy	Bela Shende, Parthiv Gohil
2010	Vamsam	Marudhaani Poovapole	Taj Noor	Surmukhi Raman
2010	Pa. Ra. Palanisamy	Singarimava Singakutty	Dhina	Chinnaponnu
2010	Aaravadhu Vanam	Yarodu Yaridam	R.Haribabu	
2010	Maanja Velu	Maanja Maanja	Mani Sharma	Priya Subramani
2010	Manmadan Ambu	Oyyale	Devi Sri Prasad	Suchitra, Karthik Kumar
2010	Irandu Mugam	Yanai Katti	Bharadwaj	Ananthu
2011	Pazhagiyathey Pirivatharkka	Ulagam Muzhuvadhum	Pakeya	Deepika Theyagarajan
2011	Aivar	Aaja Kujha	Kavi Periya Thambi	
2011	Thambikottai	Vaa Pulla	D. Imman	Velmurugan, M. L. R. Karthikeyan, Senthildass Velayutham
2011	Nandu Baaski	Thodaiye Kaattatha	Jeyam Senthil	Priyadharshini
2011	Pillaiyar Theru Kadaisi Veedu	Osiyillae Sarakku	Chakri	
2011	Mappillai	Aaru Padai	Mani Sharma	Vijay Yesudas
2011	Mappillai	Onnu Rendu	Mani Sharma	Saindhavi
2011	Kullanari Koottam	Adugira Maatai	V. Selvaganesh	Krishnna Iyer
2011	Muthukku Muthaaga	Ennanra Nee Ennanra	Kavi Periya Thambi	Krishna Beuraa, Roshini
2011	Muthukku Muthaaga	Vanakkam	Kavi Periya Thambi	Sriram, Janani
2011	Singam Puli	Naadilla	Mani Sharma	
2011	Uyarthiru 420	Natchathira Hotelu	Mani Sharma	
2011	Venghai	Pudikale Pudikudhu	Devi Sri Prasad	Suchitra
2011	Arumbu Meesai Kurumbu Paarvai	Aadaatha Aattam	Mohammed Riswan	Hema
2011	Eththan	Kadanai Kodutha Nanba	Taj Noor	
2011	Thirumangalam Perundhu Nilayam	Pongathiruvizhaa	Hitesh	
2011	Nandhi	Mayanginen Mayanginen	Yuvan Shankar Raja	Priyadharshini
2011	Nandhi	Tanjore Thavil	Yuvan Shankar Raja	Ananthu, M. L. R. Karthikeyan, Bharadwaj, Karpagam, Surmukhi Raman
2011	Nandhi	Vedhagosham	Yuvan Shankar Raja	Ananthu, M. L. R. Karthikeyan, Bharadwaj, Karpagam, Surmukhi Raman
2011	Engeyum Kadhal	Thee Illai	Harris Jayaraj	Naresh Iyer, Gopal Rao, Mahathi, Ranina Reddy
2011	Kathal Alla Adhaiyumthaandi	Ethirparthirundhen	Agni Raj	
2011	Kathal Alla Adhaiyumthaandi	Saittadikkum	Agni Raj	Raghupathy, Agni
2011	Raa Raa	Aambalaina Dhillu	Srikanth Deva	
2011	Konjam Veyil Konjam Mazhai	Thennamara Thoppukkulle	Bharani	Srimathumitha
2011	Chaplin Samanthi	Kavala Oor Kavala	Kannan	Suchitra
2011	Mallukattu	Colour Colourai	Taj Noor	
2011	Madhikettan Saalai	Madhayana Nanthanda	Srikanth Deva	Suchitra
2011	Sagakkal	Aaru Padayappaa	Thayarathnam	Haricharan
2011	Sagakkal	Vilaiyaattaa	Thayarathnam	Ranjith
2011	Sankarankovil	Puli Varuthu	Rajini	Priyadharshini
2011	Pathinettan Kudi Ellai Aarambam	Margazhi Maasam	L.D.Saravana Ganesh	Priya
2011	Payapulla	Karisakkattu Boomiyile	Kabileshwer	
2011	Rendavathu Padam	Aappu Birthday	Kannan	Velmurugan, Rahul Nambiar
2011	Ramanathapuram	Aandi Ooru	SPL. Selvadasan, S. Ebenezer	
2011	Gurusamy	Naanga Banthatta	Vasanthamani	
2012	Ivanum Panakkaran	Vettukkili Kothuthadi	Srikanth Deva	Suchitra
2012	Vilayada Vaa	Vanthenda Vettriku Veerana	Srimurali	
2012	Theni Mavattam	Yekka Yekka	Kingsley Vincent	Ranjith
2012	Madhuvum Mythiliyum	Sanda Sanda Sanda	Srikanth Deva	Suchitra
2012	Nanban	Heartiley Battery	Harris Jayaraj	Hemachandra
2012	Sembattai	Dagara Dagara	Sree Raghav	Chinnaponnu
2012	Udumban	Oram Kizhinjalum	Ramji S Balan	
2012	Udumban	Nallarukkum Pollarukkum	Ramji S Balan	
2012	Kadhal Pisase	Evan Evan Yaar Evan	Sabesh–Murali	
2012	Aravaan	Oore Oore Ennapetha	Karthik	Periya Karuppu Thevar, Rita, Priya, Krishnaraj
2012	Marina	Vanakkam Chennai	Girishh G.	Shilpa Natarajan, Ramshanker
2012	Koyambedu Perundhu Nilayam	Vittuputada	Ramesh Raja	Amirtha Varsha
2012	Pudhumugangal Thevai	Adicha Ghilli	Twinz Tunes	Senthildass Velayutham, Priya Himesh
2012	Mayanginen Thayanginen	Aadi Varum Thera Adungada	Kannan	Chinnaponnu
2012	Pachai Engira Kaathu	Naan Unnaiparthen	R.Haribabu	Banumathi
2012	Vellai Kaagitham	Licence Illamae	Sathish Varshan	
2012	Oruvar Meethu Iruvar Sainthu	Adi Aathi	Shiva	Anitha
2012	Oruvar Meethu Iruvar Sainthu	Kadalikira (Naa Rajamundri)	Shiva	Anitha
2012	Oruvar Meethu Iruvar Sainthu	Laddu Thinga Variya	Shiva	Anuradha Sriram, Malathy
2012	Nellai Santhippu	Kalavaani Kalavaani	Yugendran	Anuradha Sriram
2012	Unnathamanavan	Thiruvizhanna Koottam	Srikanth Deva	Srikanth Deva
2012	Veyilodu Vilayadu	Lungi Lungarre	Karthik Raja	Anitha
2012	Oru Kal Oru Kannadi	Azhage Azhage	Harris Jayaraj	Srimathumitha
2012	Pachai Engira Kaathu	Meesai Illa Sura Puli	R.Haribabu	Srimathumitha
2012	Racha	Neyveli Inga	Mani Sharma	Kalpana Raghavendar
2012	Pandi Oliperukki Nilayam	Azhagu Saroja	Kavi Periya Thambi	
2013	Iru Killadigal	Silu Siluvendru	Denmark Shan	Ramya NSK
2013	Iru Killadigal	Kathal Saaral	Denmark Shan	Ramya NSK
2013	Iru Killadigal	Kuliradikuthu	Denmark Shan	Ramya NSK
2013	Iru Killadigal	Pen Enna	Denmark Shan	Ramya NSK
2013	Yaasagan	Urangi Kidakkum	Satish Chakravarthy	Asha
2013	Muyal	Nee Muyandraal Vinnum	JV	
2013	Onbadhule Guru	Vaa Machi	K	Velmurugan, M. L. R. Karthikeyan
2013	Thirumathi Thamizh	Va Va Vennilave	S. A. Rajkumar	Swetha Mohan
2013	Kolagalam	Yelae Yelae Payalae	Bharani	Anuradha Sriram
2013	Karuppampatti	Adaleru Kaalaiyelam	Kannan	
2013	Karuppampatti	Karupampatti Karupampatti	Kannan	Suchitra, Naveen Madhav
2013	Angusam	Thanjavooru Singari	Srikanth Deva	Suchitra
2013	Alex Pandian	Onnam Class	Devi Sri Prasad	Priyadharshini
2013	Nadodi Paravai	Nilavapola	V. Kishore Kumar	Padmalatha
2013	Nadodi Paravai	Vizhi Moodi	V. Kishore Kumar	
2013	Yaaruda Mahesh	Yemathitta	Gopi Sundar	
2013	Ennai Piriyathey	Poomi Kaalkizha	A L S Velen	
2013	Kanna Laddu Thinna Aasaiya	Love Letter	S. Thaman	
2013	Kantha	Pathu Lorry	Shakthi R. Selva	Malathy
2013	Masani	Aatha Ingey	N Fazil	
2014	Hogenakkal	Quattarukku Matter Venum	Saran Prakash	Chinnaponnu
2014	Tenaliraman	Rampapa Rampapa	D. Imman	
2014	Manam Nilluna Nikkadhadi	Entry Nallarukku	R G Allen	
2014	Pagadai Pagadai	Pakatai	A. C. John Peter, Ramji	
2014	Pagadai Pagadai	Thookkividu Collor	A. C. John Peter, Ramji	
2014	Vallavanukku Pullum Aayudham	Takkaru Takkaru	Siddharth Vipin	
2014	Brahmaputra	Kera Kera	Sunil Xavier	Priyadharshini
2014	Vallinam	Maaman Machaan	S. Thaman	S. Thaman, Silambarasan
2014	Vanavarayan Vallavarayan	Vidudaa Ponungalae Venam	Yuvan Shankar Raja	
2014	Molivathu Yadhenil	Acham Embathedhu	Nithyan Karthick	
2014	Gnana Kirukkan	Sadha Sadha Shiva	Taj Noor	
2014	Sandiyar	Konna Usura	Yathish Mahadev	
2014	Vu	Aahaa Idhu Cinema	Abijith Ramaswami	
2014	Balu Thambi Manasile	Chikku Bukku	Devendran	Reshmi
2014	Azhagiya Pandipuram	Orekkannale	Bharadwaj	Priyadarshini
2014	Velmurugan Borewells	Velmurugan Borewells Raasiyana	Srikanth Deva	M.C.Rude, M.C.Vicky
2014	Aranmanai	Unnaye Enniye	Bharadwaj	Ananthu, M. L. R. Karthikeyan
2014	Pongadi Neengalum Unga Kadhalum	Thaaru Maara	Kannan	
2014	Pattaya Kelappanum Pandiya	Seerivarum	Aruldev	Velmurugan
2014	Kaaviya Thalaivan	Sollividu Sollividu	A. R. Rahman	
2015	Touring Talkies	Touring Talkies	Ilayaraaja	Vijay Antony, Vivek, Sathyan
2015	Settaikkaranga	Otha Ruba	Kavi Kannan	
2015	Bhooloham	Maasana Kollaiyila	Srikanth Deva	
2015	Thilagar	Oorellam Vettu Satham	Kannan	Chinnaponnu , Anitha
2015	Beedi	Malai Azhaga	Ganesh Raghavendra	
2015	Dummy Tappasu	Adiayae Flowerae	Deva	
2015	Vandha Mala	Cyberaagalam	Sam D Raj	Nincy
2015	Purampokku Engira Podhuvudamai	Marina Beachula	Varshan	Diwakar
2015	Eli	Kollai Alagu Ada Kotti	Vidyasagar	Manjari
2015	Patra	Super Figure	Sri Krishna	Nivas
2015	Jippaa Jimikki	Paraparannu Irukkudhaiya	Ranib	Surmukhi Raman
2015	Moone Moonu Varthai	Pa Paba Pa	Karthikeya Murthy	S. P. Charan
2015	Kadhal Payanam	Vaanam Enna Boomi Enna	R.K. Sundar	
2016	Arjunan Kadhali	Ennamo Senchale	Srikanth Deva	Rita
2016	Manathil Oru Margazhi	Vaalibamthan	Anuraj	
2016	Valeba Raja	Thada Thada Thada Thada	Radhan	Blaaze, Radhan
2016	Ammani	Life E Machaan Machaan	K	
2016	Selvanthan	Dhammathundu	Devi Sri Prasad	Priya Himesh
2016	Uyire Uyire	Once Upon A Time	Anup Rubens	Anup Rubens
2016	Anjala	Ayyankuli	Gopi Sundar	Tamil, Thala Muthu
2016	Sandikuthirai	Achacho Aasai	Vaarasree	Priya Himesh
2016	Sandikuthirai	Adikkura Ootha	Vaarasree	Priya Himesh
2016	Sokkali Mainar (D)	Kallu Koncham Ullappona	Anup Rubens	Priya Himesh
2016	Athithi	"Shutter Moodum Neerathile" (Tamil Beats)	Bharadwaj	M. L. R. Karthikeyan
2016	Athithi	"Shutter Moodum Neerathile" (Club Mix)	Bharadwaj	M. L. R. Karthikeyan
2016	Manal Kayiru 2	Roller Coster	Dharan Kumar	M. M. Manasi, Dr.Narayanan, S. Kousihan
2016	Narathan	Thada Thada Thada Thada	Mani Sharma	Gana Selvam, Priyadharshini
2016	Kandaen Kadhal Kondaen	Karichaanukku Kadhalikka	Naga	Sunandan
2016	Paisa	Chikku Bukku	JV	Hema Ambika
2017	Taramani	Paavangalai	Yuvan Shankar Raja	Senthildass Velayutham, Yuvan Shankar Raja
2017	Yeidhavan	Sakkara Barabara	Paartav Barggo	
2017	Aarambame Attakasam	Uttalakkadi	JK Doss	
2017	Katha Nayagan	Tappu Tippu	Sean Roldan	
2017	Enakku Vaaitha Adimaigal	Mannenna Vepenna	Santhosh Dhayanidhi	Dholak Gana Jagan
2017	Palli Paruvathile	Mamarathu Kilai Maela	Vijay Narayanan	Padmalatha
2017	Kadamban	Uchimalai Azhagu	Yuvan Shankar Raja	
2017	Vikram Vedha	Tasakku Tasakku	Sam C. S.	M. L. R. Karthikeyan, Guna
2018	Yenda Thalaiyila Yenna Vekkala	Vechi Seiraan	A. R. Reihana	A. R. Reihana, Deepika Thyagarajan
2018	Adanga Maru	Aangu Vaangu	Sam C. S.	Sam C. S., M. L. R. Karthikeyan
2018	Mr. Chandramouli	Raajadhi Raja	Sam C. S.	Ranjith Govind
2018	Ondikatta	Chandira Sooriyan	Bharani	Malathy, Shalini
2018	Kilambitaangayaa Kilambitaangayaa	Buva Buva	Sreekanth	
2018	Kadikara Manithargal	Pattasu Vedingada	Sam C. S.	Anthony Daasan, Velmurugan
2018	Maragathakkaadu	Kaatin Veedae	Jey Prakash	Vinaitha, Nanjil Rajendran
2018	Padaiveeran	Kombadhi Kombanada	Karthik Raja	
2018	Kasu Mela Kasu	Kasu Kasu	M. S. Pandian	Gayathri
2018	Dhoni Kabadi Kuzhu	Thadaigalai Udaithidu	Roshan Joseph	
2019	Gorilla	So Mitta	Sam C. S.	Guna
2021	Vellai Yaanai	Thandhom Thana	Santhosh Narayanan	
2021	Raajavamsam	Mapila Vandha	Sam C. S.	Sam C. S., Sindu Sampath
2021	Aranmanai 3	Lojakku Mojakku	C. Sathya	
2021	Annatthe	Vaa Saamy	D. Imman	Nochipatti Thirumoorthy, Keezhakkarai Samsudheen
2022	The Legend	Mosalo Mosalu	Harris Jayaraj	Armaan Malik
2023	Kuiko	Adi Penne	Anthony Daasan	
2025	Kombuseevi	"Usilampatti"	Yuvan Shankar Raja	Sinduri Vishal

=== Other language songs ===
Year	Film	Songs	Music director	Co-singers	Language	Notes
2004	Mellusire Savigana	Tham Nam Thannam	V. Manohar	Gokul, Abhishek, Bhutto, Deepa Ganesh	Kannada	
2007	Manmatha	"Surya Kirana"	Bharathi Das		Kannada	
2008	CID Eesha	Don't Worry Don't Worry	Vijaya Bharathi		Kannada	
2010	Love Journey	Evaro Ee Cheli	Niveditha		Telugu	Dubbed versions
2010	Manmadha Banam	"Uyyala"	Devi Sri Prasad	Suchitra, Karthik Kumar	Telugu	Dubbed versions
2011	Manchivadu	"Anaganaga Oka Chinnadi"	Sirpy	Shweta Mohan	Telugu	
2011	Pilla Zamindar	Rangu Rangu	V. Selvaganesh	Priya Himesh	Telugu	
2011	Oosaravelli	Dandiya India	Devi Sri Prasad	Suchitra	Telugu	
2012	OKOK	Areree Areree	Harris Jayaraj	Srimathumitha	Telugu	Dubbed versions
2015	Moodu Mukkallo Cheppalante	Pa Paba Pa	Karthikeya Murthy	S. P. Charan	Telugu	
2018	Bhairava Geetha	Appikondu Nange	Ravi Shankar		Kannada	
