= Ochayee =

- Directed by: O. Aasaithambi
- Written by: O. Aasaithambi
- Produced by: Thiraviya Pandian
- Starring: Dhaya; Thamarai
- Cinematography: Premshankar
- Edited by: G. Sasikumar
- Music by: Jeevaraja
- Production company: Aachi Kizhavi Thirai Koodam
- Distributed by: PMR International
- Release date: 15 October 2010
- Running time: 135 minutes
- Country: India
- Language: Tamil

Ochayee is a 2010 Tamil language drama film directed by O. Aasaithambi. The film stars newcomers Dhaya and Thamarai, with Rajesh, Santhana Bharathi, Ganja Karuppu, Shakeela, O. Murugan and Thiravi Pandian playing supporting roles. The film, produced by Thiraviya Pandian, had musical score by Jeevaraja and was released on 15 October 2010.

== Plot ==
The film begins with the ruffian Mokkasamy (Dhaya) killing the village big-wig Nagarasu in Madurai.

In the past, Periyamaayan (Rajesh) was the father of the young Mokkasamy who had lost his mother at a very young age. To care of Mokkasamy, Periyamaayan decided to re-marry to a much younger woman but she then ill-treated Mokkasamy and disallowed intimacy with Periyamaayan. When Periyamaayan came to know about his second wife's extramarital affair with a stranger, Periyamaayan killed them both and was jailed, leaving his son alone. Therefore, Mokkasamy was struggling with no money and he did odd jobs. Karutha Pandi (Thiravi Pandian), a local rowdy with a golden heart, took Mokkasamy under his wing and considered Mokkasamy like his own son.

Many years later, after coming out of jail, Periyamaayan returns to his village and he is astonished to see his son Mokkasamy being arrested by the police. A constable told about his wife's illicit affair with Nagarasu to Mokkasamy thus an infuriated Mokkasamy killed Nagarasu. Karutha Pandi then bails Mokkasamy out of jail. Aandi Thevar (Santhana Bharathi), the village big-wig and Nagarasu's ally, urges to take revenge on Mokkasamy.

One day, the mother of Ochayee (Thamarai) dies and Periyamaayan brings Ochayee at his home. Mokkasamy, who became a misogynist after his stepmother's affair, spends his time humiliating and insulting his childhood sweetheart Ochayee. Thereafter, he falls in love with Ochayee. Karutha Pandi advises Mokkasamy to become a responsible man and to find a decent job. In the meantime, Aandi Thevar is killed by his mentally ill son and the villagers blame Mokkasamy for killing him, hence the police encounter Karutha Pandi and his henchmen. Mokkasamy, who is hiding from the police, marries Ochayee in a hurry with the blessings of Periyamaayan and the two plan to escape from the village. The couple in an autorickshaw is then hit by a lorry and they are killed in the accident.

== Cast ==
- Dhaya as Mokkasamy
- Thamarai as Ochayee
- Rajesh as Periyamaayan
- Santhana Bharathi as Aandi Thevar
- Ganja Karuppu as Azhagar
- Shakeela as Pottu Kanni
- O. Murugan as Ezharai
- Thiravi Pandian as Karutha Pandi
- Usman as Mottai
- Usilai Bharathi as Oomaiyan
- Rathnasamy as Police Inspector
- Ochchu
- Surulipatti as Yeththu
- Haranram as Nagarasu
- Sundar as Kudaloor Peyathevar
- Vetri as Onapatti Rasu
- Chandhini as Poocharam
- Sindhu as Velammal

== Soundtrack ==
Ochayee

Soundtrack album by Jeevaraja
- Released: 2010
- Recorded: 2010
- Genre: Feature film soundtrack
- Length: 25:40
- Producer: Jeevaraja

The film score and the soundtrack were composed by Jeevaraja. The soundtrack features 6 tracks with lyrics written by Snehan and O. Aasaithambi. The audio was released in 2010 in three different places: in Australia, at the Arulmigu Osandamman Temple in Pappapatti and at the AVM studio in Chennai.

Track	Song	Singer(s)	Duration
1	"Pathooru Petti"	Velmurugan	4:44
2	"Kammangaatukule"	Harish Raghavendra, Bhavatharini	4:09
3	"Nochikattu"	Sriram Parthasarathy, Surmukhi Raman	4:50
4	"Sonthamellaam"	Surmukhi Raman	2:36
5	"Sonthamellaam"	Haricharan	5:15
6	"Marikkolunthu"	Manikka Vinayagam, Chinnaponnu	4:06

== Reception ==
Sify said, "The director Asai Thambi has nothing new to say other than rehashing so many earlier 'Made in Madurai' films with more melodrama and violence".
