= Gnana Kirukkan =

2014 Indian film by Ilayadevan

- Film poster
- Directed by: Ilayadevan
- Written by: Ilayadevan
- Produced by: Ilayadevan
- Starring: Jega; Archana Kavi
- Cinematography: S. Selva Kumar
- Edited by: Raja Mohammad
- Music by: Taj Noor
- Production company: Thangammal Movie Makers
- Distributed by: Thangammal Movie Makers
- Release date: 14 November 2014
- Running time: 148 min
- Country: India
- Language: Tamil

Gnana Kirukkan (transl. Wise Fool) is a 2014 Indian Tamil language drama film written, produced, and directed by Ilayadevan. It was produced by Ilayadevan under the banner Thangammal Movie Makers. The film stars Jega, making his debut in Tamil cinema, and Archana Kavi, while Daniel Balaji,Thambi Ramaiah, and Senthi Kumari play supporting roles. The movie is loosely based on the real-life story of a man Ganesan who is still alive in his native town. The music was composed by Taj Noor with cinematography by S. Selva Kumar and editing by Raja Mohammad. The film was released on 14 November 2014.

== Plot ==
Veera Perumal was born to Ganesh and Thangammal. At the time of the birth of the newborn baby, Ganesh turns retard and tries to kill the newborn but fails. Veera grows into a teenager and decides to leave the village for Trichy in search of a job and a better life. He finds a job washing dishes in a hotel. Due to his hard work and loyalty, the owner promotes him to a roomboy in a lodge. Veera starts saving every penny so that he may return to his hometown to his family with many gifts. Due to unfortunate circumstances, he gets fired from his job and decides to travel to Chennai to find work. He meets Sumathi, an innocent but mistreated girl. Veera decides to help Sumathi and starts liking her. The movie revolves around how he helps her and tries to become her better half and a better person despite having been born into bad circumstances.

== Cast ==
- Jega as Veera Perumal
- Archana Kavi as Sumathi
- Sushmitha as Jyothi
- Daniel Balaji as Ganesh
- Thambi Ramaiah as Selvamani
- Senthi Kumari as Thangammal
- Sevazhai Rasu as Gurusamy
- Seeniammal
- Vijaya Ammal

== Soundtrack ==
Gnana Kirukkan

Soundtrack album by Taj Noor
- Released: 2014
- Genre: Feature film soundtrack
- Length: 28:41
- Language: Tamil
- Producer: Taj Noor

Taj Noor chronology
Eththan (2011)	Gnana Kirukkan (2014)	Katham Katham (2015)

The soundtrack was composed by Taj Noor.

Tracklist
No.	Title	Singer(s)	Length
1.	"Madura Marikkozhundhe"	Haricharan, Saindhavi	5:11
2.	"Munnoru Naall"	Shweta Mohan	5:22
3.	"Otha Usura Kondu"	Veera Shankar, Jaya Murasu	4:48
4.	"Yaarai Nambi"	Madhu Balakrishnan	4:13
5.	"Sadha Sadha Shiva"	Mukesh Mohamed	3:54
6.	"Kanneera Edapooda"	Nivas, Pooja	5:13
Total length:			28:41
