= Eththan =

- Directed by: L Suresh
- Written by: L Suresh
- Produced by: Nazir
- Starring: Vimal; Sanusha; Jayaprakash
- Cinematography: KPR Ramesh
- Edited by: Raja Mohammed
- Music by: Taj Noor
- Production company: Sherali Films
- Release date: 27 May 2011
- Running time: 142 minutes
- Country: India
- Language: Tamil

Eththan (transl. Deceiver), also known as Ethan, is a 2011 Indian Tamil-language action thriller film written and directed by L Suresh. The film stars Vimal and Sanusha, whilst Jayaprakash and Sarvajit appear in supporting roles. The music was composed by Taj Noor. A remake of the 2010 Telugu film Kalavar King, directed by Suresh himself, the film was released on 27 May 2011, with moderate review.

== Plot ==
Sathyamoorthy is the son of a schoolteacher named DK in Kumbakonam. Sathya is a happy-go-lucky youngster who yearns to do business. To achieve his "mission", he borrows money from all quarters and is almost drowned in debts. Even as his father advises him to start leading life in a responsible manner, enters a student named Selvi. Sathya gets acquainted to Selvi, and his life takes a turn. Meanwhile, Selvi is in trouble because her paternal aunt's son Pandiyan, a rowdy, wants her to marry him. Selvi dismisses this proposal out of hand, because she hates Pandiyan who has killed her father. One day while goofing around with Sathya, Selvi loses the necklace that Pandiyan had given her. Sathya and Selvi escape to Chennai, but Pandiyan and a corrupt inspector come and trouble them. Sathya brilliantly switches on the police's cordless phone, through which the Assistant Commissioner of Police learns about Pandiyan and arrests him. The film ends with Sathya opening a cable TV station and becoming successful.

== Cast ==
- Vimal as Sathyamoorthy
- Sanusha as Selvi
- Jayaprakash as DK, Sathya's father
- Sarvajit as Pandiyan
- Pragathi as Sathya's mother
- Santhana Bharathi as Selvi's father
- Senthi Kumari as Selvi's mother
- Syamantha Kiran as Fathima, Selvi's friend
- Singampuli as Veerasingam
- Manobala as Bank Manager
- M. S. Bhaskar as Swami
- Kavithalaya Krishnan as MC
- Ramdoss as Lender
- Munishkanth as Bank Agent
- Mayilsamy
- Madhan Bob
- Ashvin Raja
- Amarasigamani
- Nandha Saravanan
- Lakshya in a cameo appearance
- Sampath Raj as Assistant Commissioner of Police (cameo appearance)

== Soundtrack ==
The soundtrack was composed by Taj Noor in his second venture after Vamsam. The song "Mazhaiyudhir Kaalam" is composed in Carnatic Raga Shuddha Dhanyasi aka Raag Dhani (of Hindustani music)

Eththan

Soundtrack album by Taj Noor
- Released: 2011
- Genre: Feature film soundtrack
- Length: 25:56
- Language: Tamil
- Producer: Taj Noor

Taj Noor chronology
Vamsam (2010)	Eththan (2011)	Gnana Kirukkan (2014)

No.	Title	Singer(s)	Length (m:ss)
1	"Mazhaiyudhir Kaalam"	Vijay Yesudas, Saindhavi	04:29
2	"Kannadasan"	Ananthu, Solar Sai, Sree Ranjini	04:06
3	"Ethan Kelambittanya"	M. L. R. Karthikeyan, Bhagyaraj, Ramesh	02:44
4	"Sigappu Thamaraye"	Ananthu	04:35
5	"Kaalayile Kan Vizicha"	Velmurugan	02:16
6	"Jimparapara"	Taj Noor, Manthangi	03:45
7	"Kadanai Kodutha Nanba"	Mukesh Mohamed	04:01
