= Gilli Bambaram Goli =

Indian comedy drama film by D. Manoharan

- Poster
- Directed by: D. Manoharan
- Written by: D. Manoharan
- Starring: Prasath; Deepthi Shetty; Tamizh; Naren; Santhosh Kumar
- Cinematography: Nagakrishna
- Edited by: P. Sai Suresh
- Music by: Y. R. Prasad
- Production company: Shri Sai Film Circuit
- Release date: 15 March 2019
- Country: India
- Language: Tamil

Gilli Bambaram Goli (transl. Gilli, top, marbles) is a 2019 Indian Tamil-language comedy drama film directed by D. Manoharan. and starring newcomers Prasath, Deepthi Shetty, Tamizh, Naren and Santhosh Kumar.

== Cast ==
- Prasath
- Deepthi Shetty
- Tamizh
- Naren
- Santhosh Kumar
- Ganja Karuppu
- Thalaivasal Vijay

== Production ==
The five lead actors were chosen from a group of forty to fifty people and given four months acting training. The film was shot in Malaysia (including Langkawi) and Hyderabad.

== Soundtrack ==
The soundtrack of the film was composed by Y. R. Prasad.

Track listing
No.	Title	Lyrics	Singer(s)	Length
1.	"Gilli Bambaram Goli"	Snehan	M. L. R. Karthikeyan, Mukesh	5:09
2.	"Vaanam Pola Vaazha Ninaithen"	Snehan	Karthik, Rita Thyagarajan	5:40
3.	"Vaada Vaada Nee Vaada"	Snehan	Naveen Madhav, M. L. R. Karthikeyan, Janani	4:38
4.	"Engo Pogudhu Kaalgal Ellaam"	Snehan	Surmukhi Raman, Rahul	4:22
5.	"Kaattil Vaazhum Mirugam"	Snehan	Ranjith	3:45
6.	"Kathi Indri Ratham Indri"	Snehan	Naveen Madhav	2:55
Total length:				26:29

== Reception ==
A critic from The Times of India rated the film 1 1/2 out of 5 and wrote that "Though the performances of its lead actors are convincing, and Nagakrishna's cinematography is another positive aspect, the amateurish making and shoddy screenplay make it a tiring watch". A critic from Maalai Malar called the film "a good game". National film critic Malini Mannath wrote that "Apart from the sluggish writing and execution, the film is low on technical values and could have done with some finesse".
