= Thittakudi (film) =

- Directed by: Sundaran
- Written by: Sundaran
- Produced by: R. Sivagokul Raj
- Starring: Ravi; Aswatha
- Cinematography: A. Karuppaiyah
- Edited by: P. G. Vel
- Music by: Selvanambi
- Production company: Sri Krishna Pictures
- Release date: 25 June 2010
- Running time: 140 minutes
- Country: India
- Language: Tamil

Thittakudi is a 2010 Indian Tamil language drama film directed by Sundaran. The film stars newcomers Ravi and Aswatha, with Munnar Ramesh, R. Sivakumar, Dindigul Meyyappan, Senthi Kumari and Sujibala playing supporting roles. The film, produced by R. Sivagokul Raj, had musical score by Selvanambi and was released on 25 June 2010.

== Plot ==
In the village Tittakudi, Velu was a bad student at school and a hardcore fan of actor Rajinikanth, but his father did not want him to give him money to watch films; thus, he dropped out of school. Under the guidance of the workman Ramaswamy (Munnar Ramesh) and archenemy of his father, he became a construction worker against his father's will. With the money obtained from his hard work, he went to watch his favourite star's films.

Many years later, Velu (Ravi) and his friend Kulanji (R. Sivakumar) have become wastrels: they drink alcohol and have sex with prostitutes. When the village girl Kalaiselvi (Aswatha), the daughter of Ramaswamy, attained puberty, Velu falls under her spell and tries to woo her. She eventually falls in love with him. Ramaswamy wants his relative Durai to marry his daughter and decides to arrange their wedding, but Kalaiselvi does not want to wed him. Thereafter, Velu sleeps with Kalaiselvi and gives her money for the service. Kalaiselvi is astonished for being in love with a cold-hearted man. A villager witnesses it, the news is spread, and people begin to talk ill about them. Ramaswamy complains to the police that Velu raped his daughter, and Velu is arrested. At the police, Kalaiselvi confesses that it was a consensual act; therefore, Velu is released from jail. Fearing of losing her daughter, Kalaiselvi's mother makes her leave the village. Meanwhile, Ramaswamy's relatives plan to kill Velu.

Kalaiselvi starts working in a cotton factory in a remote village, whereas Velu realises his mistakes. Velu tries to compromise with Ramaswamy and asks him to marry his daughter, and Ramaswamy surprisingly accepts. The day of the marriage, Velu's father drinks poison to stop it, and Velu could not attend his marriage. Ramaswamy then forces Kalaiselvi to marry a drunkard. In addition to that, Velu's family rejects him; hence, Velu becomes depressed and kills himself.

== Cast ==
- Ravi as Velu
- Aswatha as Kalaiselvi
- Munnar Ramesh as Ramaswamy
- R. Sivakumar as Kulanji
- Dindigul Meyyappan
- Senthi Kumari
- Sujibala as Mallika
- Uma Ravi
- Sindhuja
- Gokulraj
- J. Durairaj as Durai

== Production ==
Sundaran, a former associate of director Agathiyan, made his directorial debut with the village drama film Thittakudi. Newcomers Ravi and Aswatha were selected to play the lead roles. Selvanambi composed the music, A. Karuppaiyah took care of camera work and the editing was by P. G. Vel. Politician M. Karunanidhi's grandson M. K. M. Arivunidhi sang a song.

== Soundtrack ==
Thittakudi

Soundtrack album by Selvanambi
- Released: 20 January 2010
- Recorded: 2009
- Genre: Feature film soundtrack
- Length: 27:58
- Producer: Selvanambi

The film score and the soundtrack were composed by Selvanambi. The soundtrack features seven tracks with lyrics written by Na. Muthukumar, Ravisentha and Ekadhasi. The audio was released on 20 January 2010 was released by M. Karunanidhi at his Gopalapuram residence in Chennai. T. R. Baalu, Rama Narayanan and director Amirtham were present during the audio launch.

Track	Song	Singer(s)	Duration
1	"Annaiye En Annaiye"	Selvanambi	1:58
2	"Idhayathula Theeariya"	Selvanambi	4:25
3	"Kaathukinge Kathavugalum"	Prasanna	4:47
4	"Kudi Kudi Thittakudi"	Roshini, M. K. M. Arivunidhi	4:49
5	"Maru Genmam"	Selvanambi	1:18
6	"Nenjukulle"	Selvanambi, Bombay Jayashri	5:16
7	"Otha Usurukulla"	Saindhavi	5:25

== Release ==
The film was released on 25 June 2010 alongside four other films.

=== Critical reception ===
Bhama Devi Ravi of The Times of India rated the film 1.5 out of 5 and said, "Director Sundaram fails to convert a good story into a must-watch film. To a large extent, this is due to poor casting choice and below-par performance by hero Velu (Ravi). He fails to stir anything in you, the way Paruthiveeran, a cheeky wastrel did.

=== Box office ===
The film took a below average opening at the Chennai box office, beginning in the fifth position the first week and finishing in the fifth position the second week.
