= Kalakalappu 2 =

2018 film by Sundar C

- Theatrical release poster
- Directed by: Sundar C
- Written by: Badri (Dialogues)
- Screenplay by: Venkat Raghavan
- Story by: Sundar C
- Produced by: Khushbu
- Starring: Jiiva; Jai; Shiva; Nikki Galrani; Catherine Tresa
- Cinematography: U. K. Senthil Kumar
- Edited by: N. B. Srikanth
- Music by: Hiphop Tamizha
- Production company: Avni Cinemax
- Release date: 9 February 2018
- Running time: 154 minutes
- Country: India
- Language: Tamil

Kalakalappu 2 is a 2018 Indian Tamil-language comedy film directed and co-written by Sundar C and produced by his wife Khushbu. It is a spiritual successor to Sundar's 2012 film Kalakalappu. The film stars Jiiva, Jai, Shiva, Nikki Galrani and Catherine Tresa.

The film was officially announced in September 2017. Production began the following month and ended that December, with filming taking place at locations in Varanasi, Karaikudi, Pune and Hyderabad. It was released on 9 February 2018.

== Plot ==
The film starts with Raghu trying to kill his father for not taking good care of his family. That is when he discovers that he owns an ancestral property in Kasi which was given as lease almost a century ago, when he meets Aishwarya, a tahsildar. He falls for her, but she doesn't reciprocate. But after a few events, she realises his love for her. At the same time, an IT raid takes place in a minister's house. The minister hands over the laptop having his property detail to his auditor, who demands five crores to hand over the laptop. In Kasi, Raghu's ancestral property is taken care by Srinivas alias Seenu, but he was unsuccessful in the business that he is doing. It is then shown that both Seenu and Raghu had been cheated by Ganesh. They move to Karaikudi to get hold of Ganesh and get back their money, but realise that Ganesh loves Aishwarya but the later doesn't reciprocate. She tells Raghu she loves him only and asks him to ignore Ganesh. He is glad, and the duo reconcile with a steamy moment, where Raghu hides behind. Aishu when two people come, and playfully pinches her waist in the saree, tickling Aishu, as she laughs but doesn't expose him, leading the people to think she is crazy. Later, she playfully chides him for touching her, but his flattery makes her blush. Meanwhile, the minister starts his journey to get back the laptop. In Karaikudi, Ganesh and his two associates reveal that they want to cheat a billionaire to get valuable diamonds from him. Moreover, he assures to give back their money if they help him. After multiple attempts, they manage to get it overnight and plan to escape together. However, Ganesh sees Raghu with his girlfriend Aishwarya, whom he liked very much. He intends to cheat both Raghu and Seenu for his revenge. Seenu and Raghu find out about this later and chase after him. After multiple chases, the diamonds in a tusk cover are placed in a random train in the railway station. How Raghu and Seenu recover their money and how the minister retrieves the laptop forms the rest of the story.

== Cast ==
- Jiiva as Srinivas (Seenu)
- Jai as Raghuvaran (Raghu)
- Shiva as Ganesh
- Nikki Galrani as Aishwarya
- Catherine Tresa as Hema
- Radharavi as Police Inspector
- Ramaprabha as Seenu's and Raghu's grandmother
- Sathish as Gopal,Hema's brother
- Yogi Babu as Bhagavan
- Robo Shankar as Ganesh's foster father's brother-in-law
- VTV Ganesh as Sait, Aishwarya's father
- Munishkanth as Muthu Kumar
- Madhusudhan Rao as Dharmaraj
- Vaiyapuri as Satyamurthy
- Manobala as Ganesh's assistant
- Aranthangi Nisha as Raghu's assistant
- Singampuli as Seenu's assistant
- Singamuthu as Bhagavan's assistant
- Santhana Bharathi as Ganesh's foster father
- Vichu Vishwanath as Dharmaraj's henchman
- Thalapathy Dinesh as Dharmaraj's henchman
- Kaajal Pasupathi as Dharmaraj's wife
- Meena Vemuri as Ganesh's foster mother
- George Maryan as Police Constable
- Nandita Swetha as Nandita, fake CBI Officer, Ganesh's girlfriend (special appearance)

== Production ==
In May 2012, following the success of the just released Kalakalappu (2012), G. Dhananjayan of UTV Motion Pictures revealed that a sequel would be made with the same cast and crew, with production intended to begin in October 2012 after director Sundar C finished his ongoing projects. The project did not materialise as Sundar felt it was "difficult to meet such high expectations" and instead directed Theeya Velai Seiyyanum Kumaru (2013) for the same studio. In November 2013, it was reported that Sundar was keen to make a sequel but would only retain Shiva and Santhanam for key roles from the original cast. However, as a result of his busy schedule in late 2014, Sundar stated that he would not work on a sequel and would prioritise other work. In April 2016, it was reported that the makers had cast Arya and Nayanthara in a sequel. Sundar's wife Khushbu denied the reports and said there were no plans for a sequel.

During mid-2017, it was reported that Sundar's big budget project Sangamithra would be delayed and he would quickly complete a Kalakalappu sequel before resuming work on Sangamithra. The media speculated that Oviya (who appeared in the original film) would work on the sequel following her rise to fame through her appearance on the first season of the Tamil reality series Bigg Boss (2017). In late September 2017, Khushbu officially announced the project. Jiiva, Jai, Nikki Galrani and Catherine Tresa were announced as the lead actors, with Shiva being in discussions for a further role.

Filming began on 4 October 2017 in Karaikudi, Tamil Nadu. Vaiyapuri among other supporting actors, joined the cast of the film during the first schedule, after Sundar was impressed with Vaiyapuri's stint on Bigg Boss. The film was then shot continuously for two months across Kasi, Pune, Bhor, Hyderabad and Chennai, as the team aimed to release the film in early 2018. In Varanasi, during a 20-day schedule, the film was shot at Ramnagar, Scindia Ghat, Assi Ghat and the lanes adjoining these ghats. Furthermore, several songs including a song on Holi were filmed during the stint. During the Hyderabad schedule at Ramoji Film City, Nandita Swetha joined the cast to play a minor role. Filming wrapped in early December.

== Soundtrack ==
The music was composed by Hiphop Tamizha, while the audio rights were acquired by Think Music.

Track listing
No.	Title	Lyrics	Singer(s)	Length
1.	"Oru Kuchi Oru Kulfi"	Rokesh, Saravedi Saran, Hiphop Tamizha	Gana Vinoth, Saravedi Saran	3:47
2.	"Karaikudi Ilavarasi"	Mohan Rajan	Jassie Gift, Sudharshan Ashok	4:45
3.	"Thaarumaaru"	Mohan Rajan, Hiphop Tamizha	Sanjith Hegde, Sniggy, Hiphop Tamizha	3:29
4.	"Pudichiruka Illa Pudikalaya"	Mohan Rajan, Hiphop Tamizha	Hiphop Tamizha, Varun Parandhaman, Rajan Chelliah	3:27
5.	"Krishna Mukundha"	Mohan Rajan	Kaushik Krish, Padmalatha, Velmurugan	3:59
Total length:				19:27

== Release and reception ==
Kalakalappu 2 was released on 9 February 2018. The Tamil Nadu theatrical rights were valued at ₹50 crore. M. Suganth of The Times of India gave the film a rating of 3 stars out of 5, saying it was not as humorous as its predecessor because "there is over-plotting and over-indulgence (Sundar C just doesn’t want to stop) and by the time the film ends, it leaves us exhausted — though, this isn’t necessarily a complaint". Srinivasa Ramanujam of The Hindu wrote, "The first half just about saunters, but the second half redeems things a bit. There are a few laughs here and there [...] but they are far and few in between". The film collected around ₹100 million (equivalent to ₹150 million or US$1.6 million in 2026) in Tamil Nadu in its opening weekend.

== Future ==
In November 2024, Khushbu confirmed that a third Kalakalappu film was in development.
