= Arumbu Meesai Kurumbu Paarvai =

Indian Tamil-language coming-of-age drama film

- Official poster
- Directed by: Vetriveeran
- Produced by: E. Kamalkumar
- Starring: Chandru; Hasini
- Cinematography: Makesh K. Dev
- Music by: Mohammed Rizwan
- Production company: New Line Talkies
- Distributed by: Lakshmi Fine Arts Academy
- Release date: 1 July 2011
- Country: India
- Language: Tamil

Arumbu Meesai Kurumbu Paarvai (transl. First mustache, naughty gaze) is a 2011 Indian Tamil-language coming-of-age drama film directed by newcomer Vetriveeran and stars newcomer Chandru and Hasini.

== Plot ==
The film follows Chandru, and his fights against the anti-social elements in his village government hostel.

== Cast ==
- Chandru as Gunasekharan
- Hasini as Jayanthi
- R. Mohanbalu as the warden
- Ollikumar as Moovendran
- Pradip Belki
- Deivendran as the cook
- Ugrapandi as Oothadiyan

== Production ==
Director Vetriveeran previously worked as an assistant to Bharathiraja. Hashini, who played one of the leads in Velvi, stars in this film. Lyricist Vairamuthu recommended Mohammed Rizwan to be the music composer.

== Soundtrack ==
The music is composed by Mohammed Rizwan. The lyrics are written by Vairamuthu and Karthik Netha.

- "Viduthi Vaazhkai Viduthi" - Krishnamoorthy, Vignesh, Rag
- "Naan Thaan Kadhal" - Ravi, Ujjaini Rai
- "Varuginrdraan" - Mohammed Rizwan, Renina R.
- "Aadaatha Aattam" - Mukesh, Hema
- "Idupazhagi O Maame" - Ajeesh Ashok, Saindhavi

== Reception ==
A critic from The New Indian Express wrote that "Despite its flippant title, AMKP is an engaging, thought- provoking campus story with a difference". A critic from Dinamalar praised the film and its unique characters.
