= Vethu Vettu =

2015 Indian Tamil-language film

- Poster
- Directed by: S. Manibharathi
- Written by: S. Manibharathi
- Produced by: S. Kumar; A. Raamasamy; D. Saravanamanickam; R. Murthi
- Starring: Harish; Malavika Menon
- Cinematography: Kasi
- Edited by: P. Sai Suresh
- Music by: Taj Noor
- Production company: Vivin Movie
- Release date: 20 March 2015
- Country: India
- Language: Tamil

Vethu Vettu (transl. All style, no substance) is a 2015 Indian Tamil-language romantic comedy film directed by S. Manibharathi, starring Harish and Malavika Menon. It was released on 20 March 2015.

== Cast ==
- Harish as Machaikaalai
- Malavika Menon as Mahalakshmi
- Ilavarasu as Machaikaalai's father
- Sujatha Sivakumar as Machaikaalai's mother
- Thennavan as Mahalakshmi's father
- Sriranjani as Mahalakshmi's mother
- Aadukalam Naren
- Meera Krishnan
- Ganja Karuppu as Attachi Appakadai worker
- Pandi as Machaikaalai's friend
- Kambam Meena as the mother of Machaikaalai's friend
- Crane Manohar as Attachi Appakadai customer
- Vengal Rao as Attachi Appakadai customer
- Bonda Mani as Attachi Appakadai customer

== Soundtrack ==
The music was composed by Taj Noor. Each song was designed to have one instrument take "center stage"; for example, one prominently featured the nadaswaram, another focused on flute, another on the thappu, and another on guitar.

Track listing
| No. | Title | Singer(s) | Length |
|---|---|---|---|
| 1. | "Aaru Kulam Thevayilla" | Nancy Vincent | 3:51 |
| 2. | "Adiye Chella Thangam" | Nivas | 4:20 |
| 3. | "Kannanna Andhakkanna" | Prabhu | 4:20 |
| 4. | "Unnai Ninanithaale" | Deepak, Jayamurthi | 3:57 |
| 5. | "Vaangadi Vaangadi" | Velmurugan | 4:18 |
| Total length: | | | 20:46 |

== Release and reception ==
The film was released on 20 March 2015. Malini Mannath of The New Indian Express wrote, "A listless screenplay and insipid narrative ensures that we neither connect to the events nor to the characters". A critic from iFlicks wrote, "Director Mani Barathi has made an engaging movie. Dialogues add strength to the movie and songs are okay in Tajnoor's music. Kasi's camera showcases the beauty of the village in a brilliant manner". A critic from Dinamalar said that the film did not live up to its title due to flaws in writing and direction.
