= Vamsam =

- Theatrical release poster
- Directed by: Pandiraaj
- Written by: Pandiraaj
- Produced by: M. K. Thamizharasu
- Starring: Arulnithi; Sunaina
- Cinematography: Mahesh Muthuswami
- Edited by: Yogabhaskar
- Music by: Taj Noor
- Production company: Moghana Movies
- Release date: 13 August 2010
- Country: India
- Language: Tamil

Vamsam (transl. Lineage) is a 2010 Indian Tamil-language action drama film directed by Pandiraaj, starring debutante Arulnithi and Sunaina. The film is produced by Arulnithi's father and M. Karunanidhi's youngest son, M. K. Thamizharasu, and features Jayaprakash, Ganja Karuppu, Kishore, Anupama Kumar among others in supporting roles. It was released on 13 August 2010.

== Plot ==
A woman keeps her son away from the ancestral rivalry of two families in the village. However, after an unforeseen incident, he takes it upon himself to punish his enemies.

== Cast ==
- Arulnithi as Anbarasu
- Sunaina as Malarkodi
- Jayaprakash as Seenikannu Thevar
- Ganja Karuppu as Sombhu Mani
- Kishore as Rowdi Rathinam Thevar
- Anupama Kumar as Meenakshi
- Myna Nandhini as Sarasu
- Hello Kandasamy

== Production ==
Vamsam is the acting debut of Arulnithi, and was initially titled Aaruvadhu Sinam. Arulnithi's cousin Udhayanidhi Stalin was initially offered the lead role but turned down the opportunity, believing he would not suit the role. Sunaina was initially reluctant to sign the film because she had portrayed a rural character in Yathumaagi (2010) but accepted because of Pandiraaj's popularity after Pasanga (2008).

== Soundtrack ==
The soundtrack was composed by Taj Noor, who made his debut as composer with this film. Sasikumar and Samuthirakani made their debut as playback singers with this film. The audio was launched in early July 2010 at Sathyam Cinemas by Arulnithi's grandfather M. Karunanidhi, then the Chief Minister of Tamil Nadu.

Track listing
No.	Title	Lyrics	Singer(s)	Length
1.	"Mannaadhi Mannaru"	Vaali	Manikka Vinayagam, Velmurugan, Pandiraaj	6:31
2.	"Marudhani Poovapole"	Na. Muthukumar	Mukesh Mohamed, Surmukhi Raman	4:56
3.	"En Nenje"	Na. Muthukumar	Taj Noor, Priyadharshini, Ananthu	4:54
4.	"Usure"	Eknath	Surmukhi Raman	1:59
5.	"Suvadu Suvadu"	Pandiraaj	Sasikumar, Pandiraaj, Samuthirakani	4:51
6.	"Marudhani Poovumele"	Na. Muthukumar	Chinmayi, M. K. Balaji	4:51
Total length:				23:01

== Reception ==
The New Indian Express wrote, "Vamsam may not give that complete satisfaction which the director's earlier film did. But the film has its good moments. And like his earlier one, this too is a clean wholesome family entertainer". Pavithra Srinivasan of Rediff.com wrote, "Vamsam is an intriguing tale of the clash of clans, but it suffers from overkill." Bhama Devi Ravi of The Times of India praised Arunithi and Sunaina's performances, the cinematography and music, but criticised the pacing.
