= Avargalum Ivargalum =

K.Veerapandian

- Directed by: K.Veerapandian
- Written by: Veerapandian
- Produced by: C. Kamaraj
- Starring: Vimal Natarajan; Sathish; Aishwarya Rajesh; Supraja
- Cinematography: Agar Senguttuvan
- Edited by: Lancy Mohan
- Music by: Srikanth Deva
- Production company: Lakshika Films
- Release date: 18 March 2011
- Running time: 135 minutes
- Country: India
- Language: Tamil

Avargalum Ivargalum (transl. Those people and these people) is a 2011 Indian Tamil language romantic drama film directed by Veerapandian. The film stars newcomers Vimal Natarajan, Sathish, Aishwarya Rajesh and Supraja, with Charle, Manikka Vinayagam, G. M. Kumar, Agathiyan, Boys Rajan, Chinnaponnu, Jayashree and Sundari playing supporting roles. The film, produced by C. Kamaraj, had musical score by Srikanth Deva and was released on 18 March 2011.

== Plot ==
The film begins with Vallal (Vimal Natarajan) and Vennila (Supraja) eloping from their remote village and going on a train. There, they meet Bharathi (Sathish) and Shwetha (Aishwarya Rajesh), but the young lovers soon leave them. The next day, in Nagercoil, Vallal and Vennila, who have no money, struggle to survive. That night, Bharathi and Shwetha find the young lovers at a bus station and take them with them. At home, the two couples tell each other why they had to elope.

In a remote village, Vennila was from a rich and upper-caste family. She was pampered by her father Mahadevan (Manikka Vinayagam) and her two brothers. Vallal was from a poor and lower-caste family, and his father Chinnasamy (G. M. Kumar) was a cobbler. Vallal had completed a degree in leather technology in Chennai and was selected by his college to pursue his studies in Singapore. Vennila's family helped Vallal financially to go abroad. Thereafter, Vallal and Vennila fell in love and had to elope.

Similarly, Swetha was the daughter of a rich businessman (Boys Rajan) and was neglected by him. Swetha then found comfort in their car driver Bharathi (Sathish), an orphan who grew up in an orphanage. The two finally fell in love and decided to elope.

The four friends decide to be independent, so they first look for a job. Vallal and Bharathi find employment in a catering service run by a kind-hearted man (Charle). One day, Vennila's brothers find the couple, and they have to escape once again. At the temple, the two couples decide to get married, and Vennila's brothers track them down. During the escape, the four get into an accident. Vallal and Swetha survive, while Bharathi and Vennila die in the hospital from injuries. Vallal and Swetha are distraught after losing their lovers. Despite being depressed, Vallal finds a job to take care of a mournful Swetha. Swetha's father eventually finds her and decides to take her home, but Swetha chooses to stay with Vallal. Vallal and Swetha, being good friends, decide to support and take care of each other.

== Cast ==
- Vimal Natarajan as Vallal
- Sathish as Bharathi
- Aishwarya as Swetha
- Supraja as Vennila
- Charle as Catering contractor
- Manikka Vinayagam as Mahadevan, Vennila's father
- G. M. Kumar as Chinnasamy, Vallal's father
- Agathiyan as Dr. Thamizhvanan
- Boys Rajan as Swetha's father
- Chinnaponnu as Vallal's mother
- Jayashree as Dr. Seema Thamizhvanan
- Sundari as Vennila's mother
- Nisha as Valli, Vallal's sister
- Meenakshi
- Mudikondan
- Vengaya Balan
- Chinrasu
- Thakkar C.
- Udhayakumar
- Kasi
- C. Kamaraj
- Laksha in a special appearance

== Production ==
Veerapandian, who had earlier worked with Agathiyan in films like Vaanmathi (1996), Kadhal Kottai (1996) and Gokulathil Seethai (1996), made his directorial debut with Avargalum Ivargalum under the banner of Lakshika Films. Newcomer Vimal Natarajan, Azhagi fame Sathish, Aishwarya Rajesh and Supraja were selected to play the lead roles. Director Agathiyan was also cast to play a doctor. Veerapandian said, "My film is based on a real-life incident that took place in Chennai. It is about a touching incident that happened in a friend’s life. Rest assured, this movie will leave the viewer strengthened and refreshed". The film had been shot extensively in areas like Nagercoil, Virudhachalam and Visakhapatnam.

== Soundtrack ==
Avargalum Ivargalum

Soundtrack album by Srikanth Deva
- Released: 18 September 2010
- Recorded: 2010
- Genre: Feature film soundtrack
- Length: 26:56
- Label: Sony Music India
- Producer: Srikanth Deva

The film score and the soundtrack were composed by Srikanth Deva. The soundtrack was released on 18 September 2010 by actress Devayani.

Tracklist
No.	Title	Lyrics	Singer(s)	Length
1.	"Enna Thavam Senjiputten"	Na. Muthukumar	Bhavatharini	5:36
2.	"Para Para"	Snehan	Karthik, Senthildass Velayutham, Surmukhi Raman, Renuka	4:47
3.	"Idhu Oru Kadhal Vilaiyattu"	Kabilan	Vijay Yesudas	3:19
4.	"Thedi Thedi"	Palani Bharathi	Surmukhi Raman	4:29
5.	"Pathaigal"	Snehan	Manikka Vinayagam	3:25
6.	"Aaravalli"	Ilaya Kamban	Velmurugan, Chinnaponnu	5:20
Total length:				26:56

== Release ==
The film was released on 18 March 2011 alongside Muthukku Muthaaga, Minsaram and Lathika.

The New Indian Express wrote, "The inconsistency in the narration, the ambiguity in the scenes of Vallal and Shweta negate the impact of the positive elements [..] The performances too could have been done with more finesse and consistency" and concluded, "It is a plot with potential, had only the director made an effort to infuse some novelty in it. But inexperience comes in the way of executing his ideas on to the screen in a smooth and a convincing way". Dinamalar praised the performances of the actors, the cinematography by Agar Senguttuvan and the songs composed by Srikanth Deva. Kungumam also praised the actors and the songs.

=== Box office ===
The film did not fare well commercially.
