= Annaatthe (soundtrack) =

2021 film soundtrack by D. Imman

- Soundtrack album cover

Soundtrack album by D. Imman
- Released: 25 October 2021
- Recorded: 2019–2021
- Genre: Feature film soundtrack
- Length: 37:27
- Language: Tamil
- Label: Sun Pictures
- Producer: D. Imman

D. Imman chronology
| Udanpirappe (2021) | Annaatthe (2021) | Pon Manickavel (2021) |

Singles from Annaatthe
- 1. "Annaatthe Annaatthe" Released: 2 October 2021; 2. "Saara Kaatrae" Released: 6 October 2021; 3. "Marudhaani" Released: 11 October 2021; 4. "Vaa Saamy" Released: 25 October 2021

Annaatthe (transl. Big Brother) is the soundtrack album composed by D. Imman from the 2021 Tamil film of the same name, starring Rajinikanth and the film was directed by Siva. The film marked Imman's first collaboration with Rajinikanth and second collaboration with Siva after Viswasam (2019). The album featured six songs consisting of varied genres and sung by different singers; lyrics written by Thamarai, Viveka, Yugabharathi, Arun Bharathi, Mani Amuthavan and Arivu. On 2 October 2021, the track "Annaatthe Annaatthe" was released as the first single from the film. This track was sung by S. P. Balasubrahmanyam, who had sung most of the introductory songs of films featuring Rajinikanth; it marked his last film song before his death in September 2020. The track was released posthumously as an heartfelt tribute to the late singer. The singles – "Saara Kaatrae" and "Marudhaani" were released on 6 and 11 October respectively. The audio album released in jukebox format on YouTube on 25 October, and a week later (1 November), the songs were released through streaming platforms. It was launched without a promotional event due to the ongoing COVID-19 pandemic restrictions.

== Development ==
The film marked D. Imman's first collaboration with Rajinikanth, second collaboration with Siva and the production house after Viswasam and Namma Veettu Pillai (2019); his work in the former fetched him National Film Award for Best Music Direction. In an interview with Sudhir Srinivasan of The New Indian Express, Imman said that "Fans expect certain factors from Rajinikanth's songs. On the other hand, I want the album to carry my identity as well. I have to cater to both. In addition to that, Rajini sir is acting in a full-fledged rural entertainer after a while. So, the album should justify all these aspects." Composition of the songs held during January–March 2020, and after being interrupted due to COVID-19 lockdowns in that month; was later resumed on November. The music works of the film were completed within February 2021.

The album will reportedly have six tunes; five songs and a theme track, and feature lyrics written by Thamarai, Viveka, Yugabharathi, Arun Bharathi, Mani Amuthavan and Arivu. Imman said that the album will consist songs of varied genres: a mass track (which is the opening song of the film), melody, dance and festive numbers. Sun Pictures had planned to withhold the audio rights, along with the satellite and digital rights of the film and had planned to release the entire soundtrack the company.

One of the songs is an introductory number sung by S. P. Balasubrahmanyam, who had crooned for most of the actor's introductory songs. The track was written by Viveka, and was reportedly considered to be a "highly-energetic number", and also the "best-ever opening song" for Rajinikanth, according to Imman. It was the last song he recorded before his death on 25 September 2020. The album will feature songs sung by K. S. Chithra, Sid Sriram, Shreya Ghoshal, Vandana Srinivasan, Nakash Aziz, Anthony Daasan, Arivu, Mukesh Mohammed, Nochipatti Thirumoorthy, Keezhakkarai Samsudheen, Anirudh Ravichander, Diwakar and D. Imman himself. However, the songs by Anirudh and Diwakar, were not included in the final tracklist. In October 2021, he brought in Nadaswaram exponent, Dr. K. P. Kumaran from Jaffna, to record an instrumental track for one of the songs in the album.

== Track listing ==
| No. | Title | Lyrics | Singer(s) | Length |
|---|---|---|---|---|
| 1. | "Annaatthe Annaatthe" | Viveka | S. P. Balasubrahmanyam | 4:31 |
| 2. | "Saara Kaatrae" | Yugabharathi | Sid Sriram, Shreya Ghoshal | 4:06 |
| 3. | "Marudhaani" | Mani Amuthavan | D. Imman, Vandana Srinivasan, Nakash Aziz, Anthony Daasan | 5:01 |
| 4. | "Yennuyire" (Male Version) | Thamarai | Sid Sriram | 4:23 |
| 5. | "Vaa Saamy" | Arun Bharathi | Mukesh Mohamed, Nochipatti Thirumoorthy, Keezhakkarai Samsudheen | 4:13 |
| 6. | "A For Annaatthe" | Arivu | Arivu, Rajinikanth (Voice Over) | 3:41 |
| 7. | "Yennuyire" (Female Version) | Thamarai | K. S. Chithra | 4:09 |
| 8. | "Thalaivar Rampage" (Theme Music) | — | — | 1:57 |
| 9. | "Village Kuthu" (Theme Music) | — | — | 1:55 |
| 10. | "Yennuyire" (Instrumental) | — | K. P. Kumaran | 4:12 |
| Total length: | | | | 37:27 |

Telugu
| No. | Title | Lyrics | Singer(s) | Length |
|---|---|---|---|---|
| 1. | "Annayyaa Annayyaa" | Ramajogayya Sastry | S. P. Charan | 4:19 |
| 2. | "Raa Saamy" | Kasarla Shyam | Mukesh Mohammad | 4:13 |
| 3. | "Hali Hali" | Kasarla Shyam | Haricharan, Vandana Srinivasan | 4:06 |
| 4. | "Aha Kalyanam" | Ramajogayya Sastry | D. Imman, Nakash Aziz, Anthony Daasan, Vandana Srinivasan | 4:17 |
| 5. | "Thellaaradhe" | Bhaskarabhatla Ravi Kumar | Haricharan | 4:23 |
| 6. | "Ye Jenmalo" | Bhaskarabhatla Ravi Kumar | Chinmayi | 4:09 |
| 7. | "Peddanna Rampage" (Theme Music) | — | — | 1:57 |
| 8. | "Thalaivar Rampage" (Theme Music) | — | — | 1:55 |
| 9. | "Thellaaradhe" (Instrumental) | — | K. P. Kumaran | 4:12 |
| Total length: | | | | 33:31 |

== Background score ==
Annaatthe (Original Soundtrack Jukebox)

Film score by D. Imman
- Released: 12 December 2021
- Recorded: 2021
- Genre: Film score
- Length: 44:20
- Language: Tamil
- Label: Sun Pictures
- Producer: D. Imman
External audio
- Film Score on YouTube

The original soundtrack was released by Sun Pictures on 12 December 2021, which coincides Rajinikanth's Birthday.

| No. | Title | Length |
|---|---|---|
| 1. | "Annaatthe's Rampage" | 0:54 |
| 2. | "Shadow of Hope" | 0:41 |
| 3. | "Underworld" | 0:54 |
| 4. | "Madrasi's Anger" | 3:35 |
| 5. | "God's Power" | 2:08 |
| 6. | "The Evil" | 1:24 |
| 7. | "Kaalaiyan's Action" | 3:39 |
| 8. | "The Wall Fight" | 3:20 |
| 9. | "Thanga Meenatchi's Entry" | 1:29 |
| 10. | "Sister's Birth" | 2:07 |
| 11. | "Sister Love" | 1:12 |
| 12. | "Marriage Proposal" | 3:12 |
| 13. | "Happy Tears" | 1:53 |
| 14. | "Bride Goes Missing" | 7:59 |
| 15. | "Kaalaiyan's Naughtiness" | 0:30 |
| 16. | "Laughter" | 0:59 |
| 17. | "Festival" | 2:08 |
| 18. | "Winning The Court Case" | 1:52 |
| 19. | "Meenatchi Meets Pattammal" | 2:26 |
| 20. | "Meenatchi's Husband Anger" | 2:09 |
| Total length: | | 44:20 |

== Release ==
"During the filming of the song that SPB, the man who lived as my voice for 45 years, sung in Annaatthe, I never imagined that it would be the last song he would sing for me. My dear SPB will live on forever through his sweet voice"

— Rajinikanth on Twitter, about expressing his emotions on S. P. Balasubrahmanyam, singing his last song for the film Annaatthe

It has been falsely reported that the first single (later deciphered as the title track "Annaatthe Annaatthe") will be released on 25 September 2021, coinciding Balasubrahmanyam's death anniversary, in order to pay a heartfelt tribute to the singer. However, Imman decided against doing so, as the song release will become a celebration among the fans and the track being unveiled on a mourning day will not be considered as a right tribute, which as a result the song release was postponed to a later date. While asking about the song, Imman said that the song will be "an energetic song from the voice of S. P. Balasubrahmanyam, and also an emotional one due to the singer's untimely death".

On 2 October, coinciding the occasion of Gandhi Jayanti, the makers unveiled the introductory title track from the album. It received positive response from fans while also became emotional as it was considered as the last song that Balasubrahmanyam had sung for the film. A review from The Hindu concluded that "SPB's swansong makes fans in a state of joy and sadness, for it which marks his final song in films". The Indian Express further wrote "With his trademark gusto, SPB has crooned the Annaatthe Annaatthe song, which would set the tone and energy for the rest of the movie in theatres. The number ticks all the boxes that are required to qualify as a Rajinikanth introduction song. It is heavy on beats and is loaded with messages and wisdom to live a fruitful and fulfilling life." India Today further stated that "the song is electrifying and the colourful visuals of the song perfectly go with its peppy mood". Before the song release, Rajinikanth took to Twitter expressing his emotions about the song and Balasubrahmanyam and further said that his love for the late singer will live on through his sweet voice forever. Within 48 hours, the track crossed 4.8 million views on YouTube.

The second single track "Saara Kaatrae" released on 6 October 2021, it is a romantic number sung by Sid Sriram and Shreya Ghoshal, being picturised on Rajinikanth and Nayanthara. Indiaglitz stated that the song is a "soothing melody with a scenic beauty" while further saying that "The song is just as breezy as the lyrics and is definitely a visual treat for Superstar and Lady superstar fans". On 11 October 2021, the third single track "Marudhaani" sung by Vandana Srinivasan, Nakash Aziz and Anthony Daasan, was released. It is a pre-wedding celebration pictured on Rajinikanth, Meena, Khushbu and Keerthy Suresh, which was regarded as an "upbeat festive track" by The Indian Express and The Federal. Pranita Chaubey of NDTV praised Rajinikanth's dance moves in the number, while writing for the song. Later, the fourth track "Vaa Saamy" was released along with the soundtrack on 25 October. It was recorded by Mukesh Mohammad, along with physically challenged singers, Nochipatti Thirumoorthy and Keezhakkarai Samsudheen. With the jukebox format being initially released, the songs were released through the music streaming platforms on 1 November 2021.

== Reception ==
Behindwoods gave the album a rating of 3 out of 5 stars saying it as "Imman's solid debut with the Superstar" and "a mass commercial album". Meera Chithirappavai, in her music review for Moviecrow, rated three-and-a-half out of five stars and said "The album is a well-balanced, planned and executed from Imman, one that offers a bit of everything we expect to see in a rural drama and set the mood". She further wrote: "the album doesn't disappoint any strata or category of audience, but unapologetically conforms to playing to the gallery but the intelligence with which it has been packaged makes every song worth your while". Vipin Nair of Music Aloud too gave 3.5 stars and said "Imman strikes a fine balance between his musical sensibilities and the grandeur expected of a Rajni movie to produce an entertaining soundtrack."

== Personnel ==
Credits adapted from the official YouTube channel of Sun TV

- Composition, production, musical arrangements, recording, mixing, mastering – D. Imman
- Lyrics – Thamarai, Viveka, Yugabharathi, Arun Bharathi, Mani Amuthavan, Arivu
- Singers – D. Imman, S. P. Balasubrahmanyam, Sid Sriram, Shreya Ghoshal, Anirudh Ravichander, Diwakar, Vandana Srinivasan, Nakash Aziz, Anthony Daasan, Mukesh Mohammad, Nochipatti Thirumoorthy, Keezhakkarai Samsudheen,
- Additional music production – Ranjan
- Acoustic, electric and bass guitar – Keba Jeremiah
- Electric slide guitar – Pradeep Kumar
- Woodwinds, Clarinet, Saxophone – Nathan
- Shehnai – Balesh
- Sitar – Kishore
- Nadaswaram – D. Balasubramani, K. P. Kumaran
- Stringed instruments (mandolin, oud, bouzuki, pipa, saz, banjonin) – S. M. Subhani
- Indian percussions – Babu, Pradeep, Raja, Balu, Manoj, Saravanan, David, Chiranjeevi, Azhagiri (conducted by Kaviraj)
- Chennai Strings Orchestra conducted by – Yensone Bagyanathan
- Violin – Rex Isaac, Ramachandran, Sasi, Murali, B. G. Venkatesh, George, Mohan, Dhayalan, David Ling, Samson, Prabhu, Ruben, Baskar, Vijayabaskar, Jayakumar, Selva, Shiva, Sekar, Seenu, Narayana Rao, Manoj
- Viola – Sebastian, Balu, Hemanth, Girijan, Selva, Gopi, Chandran, Anita, Joseph, Cyril, Dinakar, Vinaykumar
- Cello – Sekar, Somnath, Francis, Seenu
- Bass – Bidhyut, Suresh
- Trumpet – Maxwell
- Harmony – Santosh Hariharan, Deepak, Shenbagaraj, Aravind Srinivas, Narayanan, Vignesh Narayanan, Veena Murali, Sowmya Mahadevan, Deepthi Suresh, Abinaya Shenbagaraj, Ala B Bala, Soundarya, Nandakumar
- Kids vocals – Sahana, Aditya Suresh
- Elfe Choir – Maria Roe Vincent, Angelin Nisha, Sheryl Suraj, Deepa Shankar, Nisha Sharon, Krithika Konda, Sneha Sathya, Padmaja Sreenivasan, Snigdha Chandra, Anuj Mathew, Rohit Sridhar, Reshwin Nishith, Aneesh Solomon (conducted by Maria Roe Vincent)
- Whistle – Swetha Suresh
- Studio – D. Imman's Sound Factory
- Strings recording – Lijesh Kumar (Voice and Vision Studios)
- iTunes Digital Mastering – Shadab Rayeen (New Edge Studios, Mumbai) [Assisted by Pukhraj, Milan]
- Managers – Peter (D. Imman's Sound Factory), Ashok Kumar (Voice and Vision Studios)
- System Consultant – Tamilselvan (Audio Visuals Inc.)
- Project Co-ordinator – David
