= Nayyapudai =

2016 Indian film by Vijay Kiran

- Theatrical release poster
- Directed by: Vijaya Kiran
- Starring: S. A. Chandrasekhar; Pa. Vijay; Chandini Tamilarasan
- Cinematography: M. Jeevan
- Edited by: V. Don Bosco
- Music by: Taj Noor
- Production company: 6Face Studios
- Distributed by: Cosmopolitan Village
- Release date: 26 February 2016
- Country: India
- Language: Tamil

Nayyapudai (transl. Strike hard) is a 2016 Indian Tamil-language action film directed by Vijay Kiran. The film stars S. A. Chandrasekhar, Pa. Vijay, and Chandini Tamilarasan in the leading roles, while M. S. Bhaskar and Rajendran play supporting roles. The music was composed by Taj Noor with cinematography by M. Jeevan and editing by V. Don Bosco. The film began production in November 2015 and was released on 26 February 2016.

== Plot ==
Vellaichamy is a retired army professional who lives alone in Chennai and takes care of children from the impoverished families of the neighbourhood. With his brave act, he saves a public bus taken hostage by the accomplices of a don who has been arrested for smuggling redstanders. Vellaichamy gives refuge to Vijay, a reporter at a prominent Tamil news channel, and his colleague, as they have eloped as a couple. Meanwhile, Vellaichamy crosses swords with the local don Baby Anaconda by wreaking havoc on some of his criminal activities, and a corrupt police officer Satyamurthy, who is loyal to Anaconda. The rest is how Vellaichamy, with Vijay's help, takes on Anaconda and uses Satyamurthy.

== Cast ==
- S. A. Chandrasekhar as Vellaichamy
- Pa. Vijay as Vijay
- Chandini Tamilarasan as Reporter
- M. S. Bhaskar as Satyamurthy
- Rajendran as Baby Anaconda
- Aadukalam Naren as Karthikeyan
- Viji Chandrasekhar
- C. Ranganathan
- Krishnamoorthy
- Mippu
- David
- Naveen Gopi
- Salim Ashmitha
- Raandilya
- Monisha
- Ravi Raja
- Saravanan
- Senthil
- Anna Nagar Ravi
- Vishnu

== Production ==
The project materialised in late 2015 and Vijaya Kiran made his directorial debut. Pa. Vijay, Chandini Tamilarasan and S. A. Chandrasekhar signed on to play the lead roles. Chandrasekhar revealed he would portray a 70-year-old character in the film and would be a disciplinarian who works with Vijay, who appears as a journalist. The film was launched in December 2015 at Prasad Labs and filming started thereafter, with the team releasing promotional stills in early 2016.

== Soundtrack ==
The songs were composed by Taj Noor.

Song	Singer(s)	Duration
"Idhu Pol Oru Sugam"	Yazin Nizar, Surmukhi Raman	04:20
"Lovukku Logic Ille"	Vijay Antony	3.49
"Engirundho Vandhaan"	Mahalingam	04:31
"Naan Foreign Car Engine"	Nincy Vincent	04:03
"Nayyappudai Theme"	S. A. Chandrasekhar, Pa. Vijay	01:38

== Critical reception ==
Samayam said there was not much authenticity in the story, screenplay, and dialogue, and Jeevan's cinematography was the film's only major positive. M. Suganth of The Times of India wrote, "Nayyappudai makes it clear that it wants to be a masala movie, with an old man doing things that are usually done by a mass hero. But the problem is that the execution is so clumsy, with no sense of the filmmaking basics". Anupama Subramanian of Deccan Chronicle wrote, "SA Chandrashekaran should be lauded for taking up an action avatar at this age and he has given a realistic portrayal [...] Though the structure of the story is a tried and tested formula in Tamil cinema, had the director incorporated some fresh scenes and interesting elements, it would have turned out to be a better product".
