= Kaajal Pasupathi =

Indian actress

- Born: ThamizhChelvi Pasupathi
- Other name: Kaajal Pasupathi
- Years active: 2006 – Present
- Spouse: Sandy (2009-2012)

Kaajal Pasupathi is an Indian actress of the Tamil film industry. She had roles in the films Ko (2011), Mouna Guru (2011) and Katham Katham (2015).

== Career ==
She began her career in entertainment as a video jockey with the Sun Music channel, before moving on to work in television serials. Her first film appearance came through Sasi's Dishyum (2006), where she portrayed Sandhya's friend. She was subsequently cast in several roles as a vamp, a police officer or in glamorous roles. Her most notable work in films including Ko (2011), Mouna Guru (2011), Katham Katham (2015) and Aayirathil Iruvar (2017). In 2012, she signed up for a film titled Maadathi directed by Nagarajan, which would have featured her in the lead role of a don in Chennai slums but the film did not begin its shoot. Several films she has shot remain unreleased including Krishna's Yen Ippadi Mayakkinai, P. V. Prasad's Sakunthalavin Kadhalan, the Sarathkumar-starrer Velachery, the Vivek-starrer Thuppariyum Shankar, the Richa Pallod-starrer Nalvaravu and the Sanchita Shetty-starrer Love Guru.

In 2017, she appeared as a contestant on the television show Bigg Boss hosted by Kamal Haasan. She entered on day 54 of the show and was evicted on day 70.

== Personal life ==
During her stint on the dance reality show Maanada Mayilada, she briefly dated choreographer Sandy. They married in 2009 and divorced in 2012. In 2019, she announced her intentions of adopting a child as a single mother.

== Filmography ==
=== Films ===
Year	Film	Role	Notes
2004	Vasool Raja MBBS	Nurse	
2004	Dreams	Shruti's friend	
2006	Idhaya Thirudan	Sun Music VJ	
2006	Dishyum	Cynthia's friend	
2006	Kalvanin Kadhali	Babloo's pair	
2008	Subramaniapuram	Dancer	Special appearance in theme song
2009	Perumal	Swarna Akka (Idithangi's wife)	
2010	Singam	Police officer	
2011	Ko	Rudhra	
2011	Vellore Maavattam	Police officer	
2011	Mouna Guru	Marimuthu's girlfriend	
2013	Gouravam	Sumathi	Tamil-Telugu bilingual film
2013	Maayai	Police officer	
2014	Ennamo Nadakkudhu	Traffic Police	
2014	Athithi	Marikozhundhu	
2014	Irumbu Kuthirai	Police officer	
2015	Katham Katham	Padmini	
2016	Azhagu Kutti Chellam		
2016	Pazhaya Vannarapettai	Silk	
2017	Yaanum Theeyavan	Pasupathy's girlfriend	
2017	Aayirathil Iruvar	Arundhati	
2018	Kalakalappu 2	Dharmaraj's wife	
2018	Ondraa Irandaa Aasaigal	Kaajal	Short film
2021	Katthi	Raani	Short film
2022	Kichi Kichi		

=== Television ===
- Sindhubadh (2005-2006)
- Kasthuri (2006-2012)
- Arasi (2007-2009)
- Maanada Mayilada (2007)
- Bigg Boss (2017) - Evicted day 70
- Sun Kudumbam Viruthugal (2019)
- Iniya (2023) as Bullet Pushpa
- Ninaithale Inikkum (2024) as Shilpa

== Online ==
- Galatta Tamil as Host
