= Sembattai =

2012 Tamil film

- DVD cover
- Directed by: I. Ganesh
- Written by: I. Ganesh
- Produced by: I. Ganesh
- Starring: Dhileepan; Sreejit; Gowri Nambiar
- Cinematography: Saleem
- Edited by: Mahavishnu
- Music by: Sreeraghav
- Production company: G. S. Studios
- Release date: 5 October 2012
- Country: India
- Language: Tamil

Sembattai (transl. Red) is a 2012 Indian Tamil-language drama film directed by I. Ganesh and starring Dhileepan (previously credited as Bala), Sreejit and Gowri Nambiar.

The film's lead actor, Dhileepan died a week after the film's release.

== Cast ==
- Dhileepan as Sembattai
- Sreejit as Kayamboo
- Gowri Nambiar as Anandi
- Kandasamy as Ayyavu
- George Rajan as Irulandi
- Cheranraj as Shankaralingam

== Production ==
The film's director I. Ganesh worked under Fazil and Siddique. This film marks the debut of Gowri Nambiar, cousin of Karthika Nair.

== Soundtrack ==
Music by Sreeraghav.

- "Kattumaram" sung by Mahalakshmi Krishnan
- "Kadalodu" sung by N. Srinivasan, Deepank, G.J. Siva, Sreeraghav and Chandrayee
- "Thaiyara Thaiya"
- "Muthe Muthe" sung by Vijay Yesudas
- "Uthu Uthu" sung by Maya Sricharan and Chandrayee
- "Sumaithangi" sung by Madhu Balakrishna
- "Nenjil" sung by Ganeshraghu
- "Ariyaamal" sung by Chandrayee
- "Adhisayam" sung by Prasanna (written by Palani Bharathi)
- "Takara Takara" sung by Mukesh and Chinnaponnu (written by Palanibharathi)
- "Sembattai" sung by Mukesh and Feji (written by Seergazhi Sirpi)

== Reception ==
Malini Mannath of The New Indian Express wrote that "'Sembattai' at the most is a promising effort of a debutant maker". A critic from The Times of India gave the film a rating of two out of five and opined that "Had the director not beaten around the bush, Sembattai could have been a much better watch".
