= Katham Katham =

2015 Indian film by Babu Thooyavan

- Theatrical release poster
- Directed by: Babu Thooyavan
- Written by: Babu Thooyavan; G Radhakrishnan (dialogues)
- Produced by: G Kartik; A Mushthari
- Starring: Nandha; Natty Subramaniam; Sanam Shetty; Sharika
- Cinematography: U. K. Senthil Kumar
- Edited by: Muthulakshmi Varadhan
- Music by: Taj Noor
- Production company: Appu Movies
- Distributed by: Appu Movies
- Release date: 13 March 2015
- Running time: 143 minutes
- Country: India
- Language: Tamil

Katham Katham (transl. It's done, it's done) is a 2015 Indian Tamil-language action thriller film directed by newcomer Babu Thooyavan, son of veteran writer Thooyavan. The film stars Nandha, Natty Subramaniam, Sanam Shetty and Sharika, and was produced by Appu Movies. The film's title is based off a dialogue spoken by Rajinikanth in Baba (2002).

== Plot ==
Nandha (Nandha Durairaj) is an upright sub-inspector of police who has been transferred 15 times in three years. He is then transferred in a police station based in Pollachi. There, Police Inspector Pandian (Natty Subramaniam) is in the pay of Minister Periyannan (Rajagopalan), who runs in own government in the place. Nandha is shocked to note that Pandian and the entire police department are corrupt. Thereafter, Nandha tries hard to enforce the order. Soon, both policemen clash. Pandian becomes an honest policeman after Periyannan's men attempt to kill him, and he is revived with blood transfusions from the public. However, Nandha does not believe that he has truly changed. After a fellow honest sub-inspector gets killed by Periyannan's men, Nandha blames Pandian, and through short routes, becomes inspector himself. He arranges for Periyannan and his men to clash with Pandian, but in the ensuing fight, Pandian kills them all, while Nandha walks away.

== Cast ==
- Nandha Durairaj as Sub-Inspector Nandha
- Natty Subramaniam as Inspector Pandian
- Sanam Shetty as Madhu
- Sharika as Priya
- Nizhalgal Ravi as SP Ravichandran
- Singamuthu as Constable Kumar
- Crane Manohar as Constable Swami Doss
- Pandu as Madhu's father
- Kaajal Pasupathi as Padmini
- Rajagopalan as Minister Periyannan
- Vinod as Sub-Inspector Kannan
- Harish as Sakthi, Periyannan's son
- K. R. Selvaraj as Nandha's father
- Soundar as Constable Soundar
- Seshu as Constable Unnikrishnan
- Mona Petra as DSP Deepthi Nair
- Sindhu as Manimekalai
- Maruthu Pandi
- Nisha Dass
- Muthu K Kumaran as Registar

== Soundtrack ==
The music was composed by Taj Noor.

Track listing
No.	Title	Artist(s)	Length
1.	"Idhu Enna"	Saindhavi & Yazin Nizar	03:56
2.	"Macham Parka"	Priya Himesh & Nimcy Vincent	03:50
3.	"Paakku Vetti"	Prabhu, Surmukhi Raman & N. M. Akthar	03:54
4.	"Poda Poda"	Velmurugan, Deepak, Surmukhi Raman	03:28
5.	"Vada Pooche"	Remya Nambeesan & N. M. Akthar	03:49
Total length:			18:57

== Critical reception ==
The movie opened to mixed reviews from critics. The Times of India gave the film 2.5 stars out of 5 and wrote, "This is pucca masala material and Babu Thooyavan does a fairly good job with it until the interval point. But the film fails to pick up steam...the script just fizzles out. There are no thrilling cat-and-mouse games and in their place all we get are predictable situations, a mood-killing love track...and a tame climax that is utterly disappointing". The Hindu wrote, "If the director had avoided the temptation of including "necessary commercial elements", Katham Katham would have been a quality film". Rediff gave it 1.5 stars out of 5 and wrote, "There are a few well-written dialogues, but a cliché ridden script, and ordinary execution by the debutant director makes Katham Katham a total waste of time". Sify called it "undoubtedly one of the worst films of the year in terms of story and production values"
