= Sanikizhamai Saayangalam 5 Mani =

- Directed by: Ravi Bharathi
- Written by: Ravi Bharathi
- Produced by: S.P.S Media Works
- Starring: Sarath; Malini
- Cinematography: S. P. S. Guhan
- Music by: Xavier
- Production company: S.P.S. Media Works
- Release date: 10 December 2010
- Running time: 135 minutes
- Country: India
- Language: Tamil

Sanikizhamai Saayangalam 5 Mani (transl. Saturday Evening 5 pm) is a 2010 Tamil language crime thriller film written and directed by Ravi Bharathi, starring Sarath and Malaini. The film was shot entirely with Canon EOS 7D, a still camera. The film received mixed reviews.

== Cast ==
- Sarath as Sakthi
- Malini as Maha
- Meera Krishnan as Maha's mother
- Ravi Bharathi as Maha's father
- Rathi Bala as "Kannaadi" Gopi
- Mogan as Inspector Aathi

== Soundtrack ==
The music was composed by Xavier, his first film.

- "Enge Pocho" - Haricharan
- "Sa Sa Sunday" - Jai, Shardha
- "Thirudugiraai" - Prasanna, Surmukhi Raman

== Release ==
In a review of the film by The Hindu, the reviewer wrote that "The film is bold, and has a fresh approach but lacks a compelling climax". Behindwoods wrote, "Overall, ‘Sanikizhamai Sayangalam 5 Mani’ has some brilliant flashes and it's laudable that Ravi Bharathy has exercised his ability to narrate an exclusive tale. It is true that the film could have found an exclusive place in Tamil cinema if it had a tighter screenplay and strong performances but director Ravi Bharathy and his crew must be lauded for their effort to conceptualize a unique essay which makes the movie a decent watch." Sify wrote, "The trouble with the suspense laden plot is that it is slow and songs in flashback comes as a speed breaker. The story and screenplay lacks logic and just drags on to a predictable climax."
