= Vu (film) =

2014 Indian film by Ashik

- Directed by: Ashik H
- Written by: Ashik H
- Produced by: Nandha Kumar, B. Ramaswami, Ashok Kumar
- Starring: Thambi Ramaiah; Varun; Madhan; Simile Selva; Kaali Venkat
- Cinematography: Jaya Prakash. N
- Edited by: Kamal G
- Music by: Abhijith Ramaswami
- Production company: Phoenix Pictures
- Release date: 7 February 2014
- Country: India
- Language: Tamil

Vu is a 2014 Tamil comedy film directed by Ashik. The film features Thambi Ramiah for first time in lead role, alongside newcomers Varun, Madhan Gopal, Kuran, Simile Selva and Sathyasai. The film was released on 7 February 2014.

== Cast ==
- Thambi Ramaiah as Ganesh
- Chakravarthy as Selvam
- Varun Shamrat as Singaraja / older Maaran
- Madhan Gopal as Mila
- Smile Selva as Bharathirasa
- Raj Kamal as Karthik
- Kaali Venkat as Veerakumar
- Bayilvan Ranganathan as Producer
- Nellai Siva as Krishnababu
- Venkatesh as Sub-inspector of police
- Deeparaj as Mani
- Sudhakar as Music director
- Ajith as younger Maaran
- Neha as older Raasathi
- Madhumitha as younger Raasathi
- Sathya Sai
- Aajeedh Khalique
- Sasi Karthi
- Rishikanth
- Doomz Khanna
- Yogi Devaraj
- Zubair
- Dev
- Bhaskar Raj
- Murugaraj

== Production ==
Producer and director Ashik stated: "When I narrated this script to National award winner Thambi Ramaiah, he not only appreciated it but also gave me the dates to shoot his portions, Although he is the main protagonist, the role cannot be considered so as there is no hero in this film. As for the story, Thambi Ramaiah’s character aims at achieving something he himself knows will be difficult." ‘Vu’ denotes the Pillaiyar Suzhi.

Hero Varun stated, "Director Ashik and I were friends in Vaishnava College. I was part of the theatre group Koothu-p-Pattarai for some time but this is the first time I am facing the camera. The heroine and I sport three looks in the film."

Music director Abhijith Ramaswami recalled, "I was part of my college band. I learnt the nuances of music direction from Sadanandam, a guitarist in Ilaiyaraja’s orchestra. I scored the music for Ashik’s short film Vanjam and he liked my work and gave me the chance to work on his feature film."

Heroine Neha: "A Chennai girl, she was studying for her BBA in Puducherry when she got the opportunity to fulfil her dream. A mutual friend introduced her to director Ashik who signed her up for his Vu."

== Soundtrack ==
Music is composed by debutant Abijith Ramaswami, lyrics for all songs were written by Murugan Manthiram. Thambi Ramaiah has sung a song called "Oru Padi Mela". "Thikki Thenarudhu" was sung by Aajeedh, winner of Vijay TV Airtel Super Singer Junior 2012 apart from acting in the film. The newly elected Directors’ Union president, director Vikraman released the audio, while the south head of UTV Motion Pictures Dhananjayan received it, P. L. Thenappan, S. S. Kumaran, and G. N. R. Kumaravelan graced the event. Behindwoods wrote:"Sparkles in bits".

- "Kaalin Keezhey" - C. G. Krishnan
- "Thikki Thenarudhu" - Aajeedh Khalique, Sruthi
- "Oru Padi Mela" - Thambi Ramaiah, Arun, Ashik, C. G. Krishnan
- "Aahaa Idhu Cinema" - Mukesh Mohamed
- "Chinna kuzhandhai" - Velmurugan
- "Thikki Thenarudhu" (Seniors) - Aditya Kashyap, Vandana Srinivasan

== Critical reception ==
The Indian Express wrote: "Innovative in his thinking, debutant director Ashik seems to be bursting with ideas. If only they were all put together in a more coherent and a consistent manner" The Times of India wrote: "Its premise is filled with the promise of a madcap film that could also serve as a commentary on the industry's follies. But what we get is an amateurish comedy that is only infrequently funny and often exasperating".
