= Jippaa Jimikki =

2015 Indian film by Ra Rajasekhar

- Official poster
- Directed by: Ra Rajasekhar
- Written by: Ra Rajasekhar
- Produced by: G. V. Divakar
- Starring: Krishik Divakar; Kushbhu Prasad
- Cinematography: Saravanana Natarajan
- Edited by: Sudha
- Music by: Ranib
- Production company: 3 Friends International
- Release date: 24 September 2015
- Running time: 164 minutes
- Country: India
- Language: Tamil

Jippaa Jimikki is a 2015 Indian Tamil-language romantic drama film directed by Ra Rajasekhar and starring Krishik Divakar and Kushbhu Prasad.

== Plot ==
Krishik and Shruti decide to take a journey together to show their parents, who want them to get married, that they are incompatible. However, the adventures they have on this trip end up bringing them together.

== Cast ==
- Krishik Divakar as Krishik
- Kushbhu Prasad as Shruti
- Aadukalam Naren as Krishik's father
- Ilavarasu as a lorry driver
- Rajendran as a farmer

== Production ==
The film was shot in Coorg.

== Reception ==
M. Suganth of The Times of India gave the film a rating of one out of five stars and said that "The director mutilates a dead plot with insipid writing". Malini Mannath of The New Indian Express wrote that "The screenplay is listless, the narration insipid". A critic from Dinamalar called the film documentary-like.
