= Velmurugan =

South Indian Tamil film playback singer

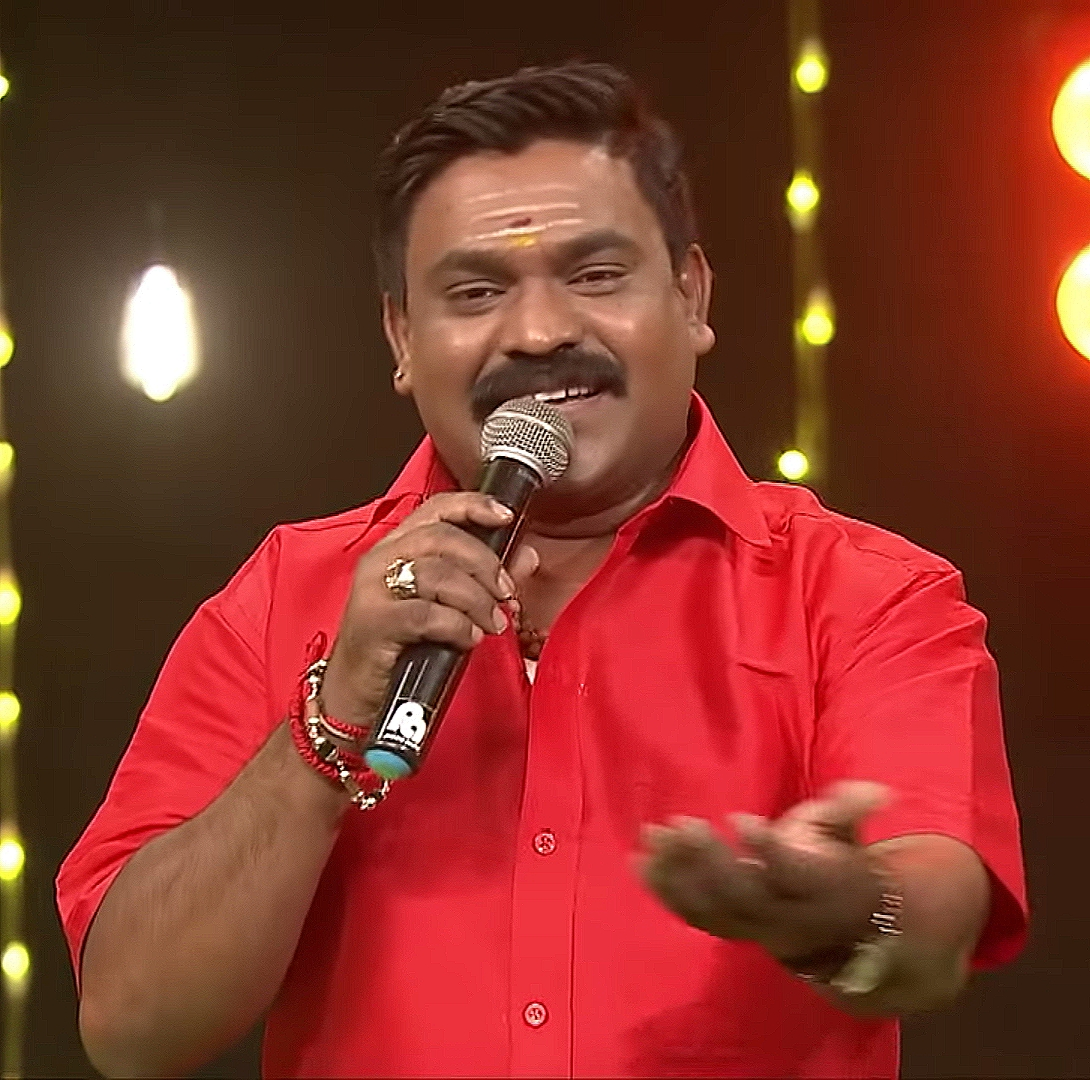

Background information
- Born: 5 March 1980 (age 46)
- Occupation: Playback singer
- Instrument: All instruments
- Years active: 2007 - present

Velmurugan is an Indian playback singer. He is known for folk songs including Madura in Subramaniapuram and Aadungada in Naadodigal and Otha Sollala in Aadukalam. He considers being called by James Vasanthan as one of the turning points in his life.

== Discography ==
All songs are performed in Tamil unless otherwise specified.

Year	Song	Film	Music director	
2008	"Madura Kulunga Kulunga"	Subramaniapuram	James Vasanthan	
2009	"Aadungada Machaan"	Naadodigal	Sundar C Babu	
2009	"Oru Nimisham"	Kunguma Poovum Konjum Puravum	Yuvan Shankar Raja	
2010	"Bale Pandiya"	Bale Pandiya	Devan Ekambaram	
2011	"Otha Sollaala"	Aadukalam	G. V. Prakash Kumar	
2011	"Vaa Pulla"	Thambikottai	D. Imman	
2011	"Kaalayile Kan Vilichu"	Eththan	Taj Noor	
2011	"Sangili Bungili"	Muni 2: Kanchana	S. Thaman	
2011	"Madhura Madhura"	Aayiram Vilakku	Srikanth Deva	
2011	"Hey Karuppa"	Thambi Vettothi Sundaram	Vidyasagar	
2011	"Vedi Pottu"	Poraali	Sundar C Babu	
2011	"Aaravalli"	Avargalum Ivargalum	Srikanth Deva	
2011	"Naadu Summa Kidandhalum"	Madhikettan Saalai	Srikanth Deva	
2012	"Aambalaikum Pombalaikum"	Kazhugu	Yuvan Shankar Raja	
2012	"Venaam Machan"	Oru Kal Oru Kannadi	Harris Jayaraj	
2012	"Pottadhu Pathalai Maapillai"	Saguni	G. V. Prakash Kumar	
2012	"Mayyal Kuyyal"	Thaandavam	G. V. Prakash Kumar	
2012	"Unnaithan Nenaikaile"	Pazhaya Vannarapettai	Jubin	
2013	"Local Boys"	Ethir Neechal	Anirudh Ravichander	
2013	"Konjam Kili"	Kedi Billa Killadi Ranga	Yuvan Shankar Raja	
2013	"Ennatha Solla"	Endrendrum Punnagai	Harris Jayaraj	
2013	"Nee Rangikkari"	Killadi	Srikanth Deva	
2013	"Chinna Kuzhanthai"	Vu	Abhijith Ramasami	
2013	"Chandran Suriyan"	Muthu Nagaram	Jayprakas	
2013	"Unnai Vanangaatha"	Madha Yaanai Koottam	G. V. Prakash Kumar	
2013	"Vaa Machi"	Onbadhule Guru	K	
2013	"Machango Mamango"	Vellachi	Bhavatharini	
2013	"Yennai Yenda"	Vilambaram	J. Vimal Raj	
2014	"Ramaiya Osthavaiya"	Kadhal Solla Aasai	M. M. Srilekha	
2014	"Petromax Light"	Aranmanai	Bharadwaj	
2014	"Palapalakkudhu"	Virumandikkum Sivanandikkum	R. Devarajan	
2014	"Paadatta Paadatta"	Vanmam	S. Thaman	
2014	"Maya Bazaar"	Yennai Arindhaal	Harris Jayaraj	
2014	"Palakku Devathaiya"	Idhu Kathirvelan Kadhal	Harris Jayaraj	
2015	"Thennattu Seemayilae"	Bathiladi	Thomas Rathnam	Film unreleased
2015	"Munthaanai Selakulle"	Agathinai	Maria Manohar	
2015	"Vaangadi Vaangadi"	Vethu Vettu	Taj Noor	
2015	"Karuppu Nerathazhagi"	Komban	G. V. Prakash Kumar	
2015	"Uppu Karuvaadu"	Uppu Karuvaadu	Steeve Vatz	
2015	"Onnam Glassile "	Veera Vilayattu	S. P. Venkatesh	Film unreleased
2016	"Pala Pona Ulagathula" (Glamour)	Pichaikkaran	Vijay Antony	
2016	"Edhukku Machan" (album version)	Mapla Singam	N. R. Raghunanthan	
2016	"Pangali"	Onbathu Kuzhi Sampath	Va Charlie	
2017	"Kannucharayam Munnale"	Ayyanar Veethi	U. K. Murali	
2017	"Atha Ponnu"	Ivan Yarendru Therikiratha	N. R. Raghunanthan	
2017	"Muttakari"	Munnodi	K. Venkat Prabu Shankar	
2017	"Kalyanamam Kalyanam"	Andava Kaanom	Ashwamitra	Film unreleased
2018	"Krishna Muguntha"	Kalakalappu 2	Hiphop Tamizha	
2018	"Athamaga Pudikkavilla"	Kannakkol	Bobby	
2018	"Thanjavur Melathukku"	Seemathurai	Jose Franklin	
2019	"Sandalee"	Semma	G. V. Prakash Kumar	
2019	"Kathari Poovazhagi"	Asuran	G. V. Prakash Kumar	
2019	"Dai Machan Dev"	Dev	Harris Jayaraj	
2021	"Dandanakka Dandanakka Thavuladi"	Velan	Gopi Sundar	
2022	"Sandaaliye"	Yaanai	G. V. Prakash Kumar	
2022	"Enna Othaiyila"	Yaanai	G. V. Prakash Kumar	
2023	"Neekemo Andamekkuva"	Waltair Veerayya	Devi Sri Prasad	
2024	"Azhagana Sadhigaari"	Rebel	G. V. Prakash Kumar	
2025	"Ayla Allela"	Veera Dheera Sooran	G. V. Prakash Kumar	

== Filmography ==
=== Films ===
Year	Film	Role	Notes
2016	Enakku Veru Engum Kilaigal Kidayathu		
2022	Padaippalan		

=== Television ===
Year	Program	Role	Channel	Notes
2020	Bigg Boss (Tamil season 4)	Contestant	Star Vijay	Evicted on day 28
2021	Mr and Mrs Chinnathirai 2	Contestant	Star Vijay	Evicted Week 8
2022	BB Jodigal (season 2)	Contestant	Star Vijay	Evicted Top 7
2024	Super Singer 10	Guest	Star Vijay	

Controversy

- He has made a religious verse, unnecessarily into a political party praising verse in the context, during Sashti Festival at Thiruchendur, Tamilnadu on 15.11.2026. Devotees claim that these kind of dirty and cheap stunt has never happened before.

== Awards ==
- 2007 – American University (Doctorate) Award
- 2009 – Edison Award for Best Introduced Playback Singer – "Aadungada"
- 2010 – Naattuppura Nayagan Award (by President APJ Abdul Kalam)
- 2011 – Naattuppura Nayagan Award
- 2019 – Radio Mirchi Award
- 2019 – Edison Award for Best Introduced Playback Singer – "Kathari Poovazhagi"
- 2019 – Kalaimamani Award
- 2019 – World Guinness Record (Tamilkalai Oyilaattam)
- 2020 – Mirchi Awards – "Kathari Poovazhagi" (Asuran)
