= Taj Noor =

Music composer, music producer, singer, lyric writer,

- Born: Taj Noor; Salem, Tamil Nadu, India
- Occupations: Music director, lyricist
- Years active: 2010 – present

Taj Noor is an Indian film score and soundtrack composer, who has predominantly scored music for Tamil films.

== Career ==
Taj Noor earlier assisted music director A. R. Rahman and worked as his keyboard player and coordinator.

His first solo film soundtrack was for the romantic drama film, Aayiram Muthangaludan Thenmozhi (2012), though delays meant that the soundtrack albums of Pandiraj's Vamsam (2010) and Eththan (2011) released before hand. He also previously worked on the Rambha-starrer Vidiyum Varai Kaathiru, but the film was shelved. For Aayiram Muthangaludan Thenmozhi, Taj Noor composed the music based on the seasons in the Kurinji, Mullai, Marutham, Neithal and Palai regions and used mostly the violin, viola and cello to record the songs. The film's director, Shanmugaraj, was a good friend of Pandiraj and recommended that Taj Noor should be selected for Pandiraj's second venture. Taj Noor made a breakthrough in the music industry with the album of Vamsam. He won further acclaim for his work in Eththan, though several of his subsequent albums had audio launches but did not have a theatrical release including Mallukattu, Adithalam, Swasame and Kaliyugam, where he worked alongside Siddharth Vipin and Arunagiri. Over the years, he has composed music for 20 films.

In addition to cinema, Taj Noor also has a presence in the advertising industry, composing music for over 500 advertising films for brands such as Chennai Silk, Saravana Stores, Ramraj, and Kumaran Silks.

As an author, Taj Noor penned the book Tarani Aḷum Kanini Isai, a comprehensive guide for aspiring musicians and filmmakers.

== Discography ==
=== Films ===
Year	Title	Score	Songs	Notes
2010	Vamsam	Yes	Yes	
2011	Eththan	Yes	Yes	
2011	Mallukattu	Yes	Yes	Unreleased film
2012	Aayiram Muthangaludan Thenmozhi	Yes	Yes	
2012	Kaliyugam	Yes	Yes	Unreleased films
2013	Swasame	Yes	Yes	Unreleased films
2013	Adithalam	Yes	Yes	Unreleased films
2014	Marumunai	Yes	No	
2014	Adhu Vera Idhu Vera	Yes	Yes	
2014	Gnana Kirukkan	Yes	Yes	
2015	Katham Katham	Yes	Yes	
2015	Vethu Vettu	Yes	Yes	
2015	Strawberry	Yes	Yes	
2016	Nayyapudai	Yes	Yes	
2016	Vellikizhamai 13am Thethi	Yes	Yes	
2016	Yaanai Mel Kuthirai Sawaari	Yes	No	
2017	Guru Uchaththula Irukkaru	Yes	Yes	
2022	Vattakara	Yes	Yes	
2025	Bioscope	Yes	Yes	
2026	Chellamada Nee Enakku	Yes	Yes	
2026	The Bed	Yes	Yes	

=== Independent work ===
- Naatu Kural
- Ramadan Mubarak
- Ellaam Valla Iraivanidam
