= Seeman filmography =

Thiralnidhi Seeman is an Indian film director and actor, who has worked in Tamil cinema. He made his directorial debut in 1996, with the Tamil film Panchalankurichi. Since then, he has directed four more films and also appeared in acting roles in films of other directors.

Thiralnidhi Seeman took up film direction as a career after being inspired by the films of Bharathiraja and Manivannan. Seeman started his career by directing Panchalankurichi (1996), a village action film starring Prabhu and Madhubala. He collaborated with Prabhu again in Iniyavale (1998), a romantic film which also featured actresses Suvalakshmi, Gouthami and Keerthi Reddy. Seeman's third film was Veeranadai (2000) with Sathyaraj and Khushbu, which garnered mixed review from critics and underperformed commercially. The failure of his initial films made it difficult for Seeman to attract producers to work on his next films. During the late 1990s and early 2000s, he worked on four other projects, Vaigai Karai Oram with Vijayakanth, Anandham with Karthik, Karma Veerar with Sarathkumar, and Sethupathi Cheemaiyile with Rajkiran, but all failed to develop beyond production.

Thiralnidhi Seeman then made the village-based vigilante film, Thambi (2006), starring Madhavan in the title role. The film's production was briefly halted following a disagreement between the actor and director, after Seeman raised an objection to Madhavan returning to be with his family for the birth of his son. The film opened to mixed reviews but performed well commercially. His most recent directorial release, Vaazhthugal (2008), received negative reviews and performed poorly at the box office. A reviewer from Sify noted the "execution is tacky and the final outcome is a dreary and boring message film that leaves you exhausted."

The failure of Vaazhthugal made it difficult for Seeman to find producers and actors to work on his other proposed projects, despite his interest in continuing work as a film director. In the late 2000s, Seeman attempted to make a film titled Pagalavan with either Ajith Kumar or Madhavan starring, but was unsuccessful. Seeman then hoped to make the film with Vikram for director Bala's production studio, but the venture did not materialise. In mid-2010, producer Kalaipuli S. Dhanu agreed to finance the project, and Seeman held talks with Vijay to be a part of the film. The actor later refused to work on the project, which prompted Seeman to speak out against Vijay. In 2013, Seeman approached Jiiva, Jayam Ravi, Arya and Vishal to work on the project, but none of the actors agreed to be a part of the film. In 2017, Seeman was in talks with Vijay Antony to feature in the lead role, and then with Silambarasan in 2018, but both actors later opted to prioritise other projects. In 2017, Seeman announced another project titled Kobam with G. V. Prakash Kumar in the lead role. However, despite an announcement, the film failed to find producers and was stalled.

Since the mid-2000s, Seeman has mostly worked as an actor. His notable roles including supporting characters in Pallikoodam (2007) and Evano Oruvan (2007).

== Filmography ==
=== As director ===
Year	Title	Notes	Ref.
1996	Panchalankurichi		
1998	Iniyavale		
2000	Veeranadai		
2006	Thambi	Tamil Nadu State Film Award for Best Dialogue Writer	
2008	Vazhthukkal		

=== As actor ===
Year	Title	Role	Notes	Ref.
1994	Amaidhi Padai	Man sitting on stage	Uncredited roles	
2001	Middle Class Madhavan	Passenger waiting at bus depot	Uncredited roles	
2006	Aadum Koothu	Zamindar's son and grandson	Dual roles	
2007	Pori	Mahadevan		
2007	Pallikoodam	Muthu		
2007	Evano Oruvan	Vetri Maaran		
2009	Mayandi Kudumbathar	Virumandi Mayandi		
2010	Moscowin Kavery	Himself	Guest appearance	
2010	Magizhchi	Kutralam		
2011	Sattapadi Kutram	Lawyer		
2011	Uchithanai Muharnthaal	Charles Anthony		
2013	Nagaraja Cholan MA, MLA	Farmer		
2018	Traffic Ramasamy	Himself	Guest appearance	
2018	Kattu Paya Sir Intha Kaali	Simon Says		
2019	Miga Miga Avasaram	Himself	Guest appearance	
2019	Thavam	Natesan		
2023	Munthirikkaadu	Anbarasan		
2026	Love Insurance Kompany	Anbukadal Vasudevan		

=== As writer ===
Year	Title	Credited as	Notes	Ref(s)
Year	Title	Writer	Notes	Ref(s)
1994	Rasa Magan	Story		
1995	Pasumpon	Story		
2007	Evano Oruvan	Dialogue supervisor	Nominated – Vijay Award for Best Story, Screenplay Writer	

=== As playback singer ===
Year	Title	Song	Composer	Notes
2009	Mayandi Kudumbathar	"Pesama Pesama"	Sabesh–Murali	

=== As lyricist ===
Year	Title	Song(s)	Composer	Notes
1997	Panchalankurichi	"Vanthigala"	Deva	
1998	Iniyavale	"Kanneerukku Kaasu", "Malarodu"	Deva	
2000	Veeranadai	"Nethi Pottu", "Vaanam Paatha"	Deva	

== Television ==
Seeman has also appeared as a host and anchor of Makkal Munnal, a weekly television talk show aired on Thanthi TV in which various social activists, political leaders and academics are part of the panel.
