= T. Arumugam (Thiruvottiyur MLA) =

Member-Tamil Nadu Legislative Assembly
- In office 2001–2006
- Preceded by: T. C. Vijayan
- Succeeded by: K. P. P. Samy
- Constituency: Thiruvottiyur

Personal details
- Born: 11 January 1962 Ennore
- Party: All India Anna Dravida Munnetra Kazhagam
- Profession: Fishermen

T. Arumugam is an Indian politician and a former Member of the Tamil Nadu Legislative Assembly. He hails from the Nettukuppam area of Chennai district. A Bachelor's degree holder, Arumugam belongs to the All India Anna Dravida Munnetra Kazhagam (AIADMK) party. In the 2001 Tamil Nadu Legislative Assembly elections, he contested from the Thiruvottiyur Assembly constituency and emerged victorious to become an MLA. In this election, he defeated Kumari Ananthan, who contested as an independent candidate, by a margin of 34,041 votes.

== Electoral Performance ==
=== 2001 ===
2001 Tamil Nadu Legislative Assembly election: Thiruvottiyur
Party	Candidate	Votes	%	±%
AIADMK	T. Arumugam	113,808	54.94%	+32.28
Independent	Kumari Ananthan	79,767	38.50%	New
MDMK	S. G. Sekar	8,483	4.09%	New
Independent	Bullet J. Selvaraj	2,221	1.07%	New
JD(S)	S. Gunasekaran	1,446	0.70%	New
Margin of victory		34,041	16.43%	−25.10%
Turnout		207,167	47.85%	−10.10%
Registered electors		432,947		
AIADMK gain from DMK		Swing	-9.25%	
