= N. Senthil Kumar =

Indian politician

N Senthil Kumar

Member of the Tamil Nadu Legislative Assembly
- Incumbent
- Assumed office 4 May 2026
- Preceded by: K. P. Shankar
- Constituency: Thiruvottiyur

Personal details
- Party: Tamilaga Vettri Kazhagam
- Occupation: Politician

N. Senthil Kumar is an Indian politician who is a Member of the 17th Legislative Assembly of Tamil Nadu. He was elected from Thiruvottiyur as an TVK candidate in 2026.

== Elections contested ==
2026 Tamil Nadu Legislative Assembly election: Thiruvottiyur
Party	Candidate	Votes	%	±%
TVK	Senthil Kumar. N	110,067	53.15	New
CPI(M)	L. Sundararajan	56,503	27.28	−
AIADMK	K. Kuppan	28,320	13.68	▼11.72
NTK	Sathya Bhaskar	8,413	4.06	▼20.37
NOTA	NOTA	805	0.39	▼0.17
Margin of victory		53,564	25.87	▲6.93
Turnout		2,07,088		
Rejected ballots				
Registered electors		2,44,903		
TVK gain from DMK		Swing	▲53.15	
