= Vijayan =

Vijayan is a South Indian name and may refer to:

== Given name ==
- Pinarayi Vijayan (born 1944), Indian politician
- Vijayan (actor) (1944–2007), Tamil & Malayalam film actor
- Vijayan (stunt coordinator), action choreographer for South Indian films
- Vijayan Nair, American statistician
- Vijayan Pillai, Indian politician
- Vijayan K. Pillai (born c. 1948), American professor of social work

== Surname ==
- Chandroth Vijayan (born 1936), Indian cricketer
- Dushara Vijayan (born 1997), Indian actress
- E. K. Vijayan (born 1953), Indian politician
- East Coast Vijayan, Indian lyricist
- G. S. Vijayan, Indian film director
- Geetha Vijayan (born 1972), Indian actress
- I. M. Vijayan (born 1969), Indian footballer
- Jay Vijayan, Tamil entrepreneur, engineer, inventor and investor
- K. Vijayan, Indian film director
- M. Vijayan (born 1941), Indian structural biologist
- M. N. Vijayan (1930–2007), Indian writer, orator and academic
- Nanjil Vijayan, Indian actor and comedian
- O. V. Vijayan (1930–2005), Malayalam novelist and cartoonist
- P. Vijayan (born 1968), Indian police officer
- Rajisha Vijayan, Indian actress
- Raman Vijayan (born 1973), Indian football manager
- Rex Vijayan (born 1983), Indian guitarist, composer and producer
- Sivakumar Vijayan (born 1982), Indian cinematographer
- T. C. Vijayan, Indian politician
- Thomas Vijayan, Indian wildlife photographer
- V S Vijayan (born 1945), Indian environmentalist and wildlife biologist
- V. T. Vijayan, South Indian film editor
- Vazhenkada Vijayan, Indian Kathakali dancer
- Vinod Vijayan, Indian film producer and director

== See also ==
- Dasan and Vijayan, fictional characters in the Nadodikkattu film series
