= Ilavarasu =

Indian cinematographer and actor

- Born: 28 August 1964 (age 62); Melur, Madurai District, Madras State (now Tamil Nadu), India
- Occupations: Cinematographer; actor
- Years active: 1984–present
- Parent: P. Malaichamy (father)

Ilavarasu is an Indian actor and cinematographer who works in the Tamil film industry. He started his career as a cinematographer and worked for 13 films, winning a Tamil Nadu State Film Award for one of them. He later became known as an actor after appearing in pivotal roles in Bharathiraja's and Cheran's films. He has starred in over 160 Tamil films, playing supporting, comedic, and antagonistic roles.

== Early life ==
He was born on 28 August 1964 in Melur, a town in Madurai district, present-day Tamil Nadu. His father, P. Malaichamy, served as a Member of the Tamil Nadu Legislative Assembly during 1967-76 on behalf of the Dravida Munnetra Kazhagam (DMK). Malaichamy was also one of the DMK members jailed during the 1975-77 Indian Emergency under the Maintenance of Internal Security Act (MISA).

== Career ==
Ilavarasu's debut film was to have been the unproduced Tamil film Top Tucker, and instead became Oru Kaidhiyin Diary (1985). He later worked in Bharathiraja's 1987 film Vedham Pudhithu.

He worked as an assistant to B. Kannan for the films Knock-Out (1992), Nadodi Thendral (1992), Captain Magal (1993), Karuthamma (1994) and Pasumpon (1995). He was credited as one of the main cinematographers for the latter four films although he worked as an assistant cinematographer. He made his debut as an independent cinematographer in 1996 with the film Panchalankurichi, starring Prabhu and Madhubala. The following year, he worked on another Prabhu movie titled Periya Thambi, directed by Chitra Lakshmanan. His breakthrough came with a significant role in Cheran's Porkkaalam (1997), which propelled him into the spotlight as a recognized actor. In 1998, Ilavarasu served as the cinematographer for two films, Ninaithen Vandhai and Iniyavale. While initially offered villainous characters, he later shifted his focus to character roles. The actor has shared screen with many actors in his career. Ilavarasu has played many versatile characters, including villain roles in a few films. Some of his noteworthy roles include Bagavathi (2002), Imsai Arasan 23rd Pulikecei (2006), Kalavani (2010), Lingaa (2014), Kanaa (2018) and NGK (2019).

In addition to his film career, Ilavarasu has also ventured into television, appearing in the 2022 series Anandha Ragam on Sun TV.

== Filmography ==
=== As an actor ===
==== Tamil films ====
Year	Title	Role	Notes
1985	Muthal Mariyathai	Photographer	
1985	Idaya Kovil	Shankar's friend	
1985	Oru Kaidhiyin Diary	Crowd member	Uncredited role
1986	Kadalora Kavithaigal	Chinnappa Das' friend	
1987	Vedham Pudhithu	Balu Thevar's nephew	
1988	Kodi Parakuthu	Police constable	
1990	Sandhana Kaatru		Uncredited role
1994	Ravanan		
1995	Pasumpon	Angusamy	
1997	Porkkaalam	Rasu	
2000	Vetri Kodi Kattu		
2000	Sabhash		
2001	Kutty	Pazhaniappan	
2001	Poovellam Un Vasam	Pandi	
2001	Pandavar Bhoomi	Carpenter	
2001	Thavasi	Kaarmegam	
2001	Shahjahan	Police Inspector	
2002	Red	Pandi	
2002	Gemini	Police Commissioner	
2002	Shree	Pasupathy	
2002	Karmegham	Saguni	
2002	Sundara Travels	Parotta Master Kasi	
2002	Maaran	Irulandi	
2002	University		
2002	Bagavathi	Singamuthu	Uncredited role
2002	Ramanaa		
2002	Style	Pandithurai	
2003	Anbe Sivam	Police Inspector	
2003	Pallavan	Pallavan and Manohar's father	
2003	Kadhal Sadugudu		
2003	Well Done		
2003	Pudhiya Geethai	Shekar	
2003	Saamy	Sivakasi Pattasu Raman	
2003	Jayam		
2003	Eera Nilam	Chellakannu	
2003	Boys	Kumar's father	
2003	Thiruda Thirudi		
2003	Anjaneya	Eshwarapandiyan	
2003	Naam		
2003	Unnai Charanadaindhen	Teja's father	
2003	Bheeshmar	Aadhi	
2003	Ragasiyamai		
2003	Sindhamal Sitharamal		
2004	Varnajalam	Police Constable	
2004	Autograph	Narayanan Teacher	
2004	Kuthu	Arunachalam	
2004	Kavithai		
2004	Jana	Jana's brother-in-law	
2004	Sound Party		
2004	Madhurey	Anitha's father	
2004	Kangalal Kaidhu Sei	John Vaseegaran's servant	Uncredited role
2004	Giri	Ramalingam	
2004	Neranja Manasu	Poochi	
2004	Attahasam		
2004	Chatrapathi	Deputy Commissioner	
2004	Maha Nadigan		
2004	Aai	Traffic Police Officer Subbarayan	
2004	Jaisurya	ACP	
2004	Meesai Madhavan	Kadalas	
2004	Gomathi Nayagam	Kutraleeswaran	
2005	Ayodhya	Vaiyapuri	
2005	Ji	Varadharajan's henchman	
2005	Kadhal FM	Astrologer	
2005	Gurudeva	Police Officer	
2005	Sevvel		
2005	Oru Naal Oru Kanavu	Rajamani	
2005	Majaa		
2005	Chanakya	Police inspector	
2005	Thavamai Thavamirundhu	Azhagarsamy	
2006	Kalabha Kadhalan		
2006	Thambi	Shankarayan	
2006	Kusthi	Abi's father	
2006	Oru Kadhal Seiveer	Aadhi	
2006	Sudesi	Cook	
2006	Don Chera	Perumal	
2006	Imsai Arasan 23rd Pulikecei	Mangunipaandiyan	
2006	Sengathu	Yedhukku	
2006	Thiruvilaiyaadal Aarambam	Muthukrishnan	
2007	Agaram	MLA	
2007	Thirumagan	Thavasi	
2007	Koodal Nagar		
2007	Chennai 600028	Manohar	
2007	Periyaar		
2007	Sivaji		Guest appearance
2007	Thullal	Security guard	
2007	Cheena Thaana 001	Tamizharasu's father's friend	
2007	Nam Naadu	Albert	
2007	Pasupathi c/o Rasakkapalayam	Terrorist	
2008	Pirivom Santhippom	Visalakshi's neighbor	
2008	Vaazhthugal	Thirunavukkarasu	
2008	Thangam		
2008	Vambu Sandai		
2008	Arai En 305-il Kadavul	Wellesley Prabhu	
2008	Kuruvi	Elango	
2008	Pandi	Periyamaayan	
2008	Kathavarayan	Police inspector	
2008	Dhanam	Dhanam's friend	
2008	Silambattam	Police	
2008	Panchamirtham	Kasi	
2009	Kadhalna Summa Illai		
2009	1977	Manikkam	
2009	Mayandi Kudumbathar	Mayandi and Virumandi's elder cousin	
2009	Engal Aasan	Muthu	
2009	Pokkisham		
2009	Kanthaswamy	Constable	
2009	Madurai Sambavam		
2009	Ninaithale Inikkum	Sethuraman	
2009	Solla Solla Inikkum		
2009	Arumugam	Arumugam's father	
2010	Rettaisuzhi		
2010	Sura	Samuthira Raja's sidekick	
2010	Goripalayam	Moovendhan	
2010	Irumbukkottai Murattu Singam	Dagalandi	
2010	Maanja Velu	Sivagnanam	
2010	Milaga	Vaazhaithoppu Maari	
2010	Kalavani	Ramasamy	
2011	Ilaignan		
2011	Seedan	Madhava Kounder	
2011	Bhavani	Shanmugam	
2011	Muthukku Muthaaga	Thavasi	
2011	Pillaiyar Theru Kadaisi Veedu	Ganesan's uncle	
2011	Mudhal Idam	Ponnusamy	
2011	Puli Vesham	Thamarai's father	
2011	Sadhurangam	Analaar	
2011	Aduthathu		
2011	Velayudham	Poor man	
2011	7 Aum Arivu	Aravind's uncle	
2011	Marudhavelu	Marudhavelu's father	
2012	Kondaan Koduthaan	Chellaiya	
2012	Kalakalappu	Anjuvatti Alagesan (Amitabh Mama)	
2012	Manam Kothi Paravai	Raamaiya	
2012	Billa II	Selvaraj	
2012	Etho Seithai Ennai	Veeru's aide	
2013	Thillu Mullu	Pasupathy's Uncle	
2013	Mathapoo	Karthik's brother-in-law	
2013	Ya Ya	Varadharajan	
2013	Jannal Oram	Police Inspector	
2013	Chandhamama	Santhanakrishnan's father	
2014	Veeram	Azhagappan	
2014	Sathuranga Vettai	Chettiyar	
2014	Pappali		
2014	Pattaya Kelappanum Pandiya	Velpandiyan's father	
2014	Pagadai Pagadai	S. Kotteswaran	
2014	Lingaa	Saami Pillai	
2015	Killadi	Inspector Britto	
2015	En Vazhi Thani Vazhi	Police Officer	
2015	Rajathandhiram	Sethu Madhavan	
2015	Vethu Vettu	Machaikaalai's father	
2015	Idam Porul Yaeval		Unreleased
2015	36 Vayadhinile	Vegetable merchant	
2015	Papanasam	Constable Shanmugam	
2015	Maanga	Nambirajan	
2015	Jippaa Jimikki	Lorry driver	
2015	Aaranyam	Kumaresan	
2016	Navarasa Thilagam	Paneerselvam	
2016	Vetrivel	Navaneetham	
2016	Ko 2	Home Minister	
2016	Uchathula Shiva	Ondipuli	
2016	Kallattam	Pazhani	
2016	Meen Kuzhambum Mann Paanaiyum	Annamalai's friend	
2016	Chennai 600028 II	Manohar	
2017	Kanavu Variyam	Ezhil's father	
2017	Sangili Bungili Kadhava Thorae	Parvathy's brother	
2017	Aayirathil Iruvar	Vanarajan	
2018	Kadaikutty Singam	Manikkam	
2018	Kannakkol		
2018	Azhagumagan	Azhagu	
2018	Aan Devathai	Solvilanguperumal	
2018	Jarugandi	Samuel	
2018	Kanaa	Thangarasu	
2019	Natpuna Ennanu Theriyuma	Ramanan	
2019	NGK	MLA Pandiyan	
2019	Kalavani 2	Ramasamy	
2019	Sixer	Aadhi's father	
2019	Magamuni	Muthuraj	
2019	Thambi	Jeevanand	
2021	Kalathil Santhippom	Ashok's father	
2021	Oru Kudaikul		
2021	Appathava Aattaya Pottutanga		
2021	Doctor	Padmini and Navneeth's father	
2021	Jai Bhim	Gunasekaran	
2022	Naai Sekar	Pooja's father	
2022	Anbulla Ghilli	Bhargavi's father	
2022	Etharkkum Thunindhavan	Aadhini's father	
2022	Maaran	Aravindan	
2022	Visithiran		
2022	Nenjuku Needhi	Sub-Inspector Malaichami	
2022	Viruman	Thenmozhi's father	
2022	Sardar	Politician	
2022	DSP	Murugapandi	
2023	Vaathi	Education Minister	
2023	Viduthalai Part 1	Ila. Ilavarasu	
2023	Rudhran	Police Inspector	
2023	Raavana Kottam	Chitravel	
2023	Parking	House Owner	
2023	Jigarthanda DoubleX	Minister Kaarmegham	
2023	Kuiko	Shanmugham	
2023	Thee Ivan	Senathipathy	
2024	Yaavarum Vallavare	Baskar	
2024	Dear	Rangarajan	
2024	Romeo	Arivazhagan and Janani's father	
2024	PT Sir	Rathinam	
2024	Maya Puthagam	Sambasivam	
2024	Raayan	Meghalai's father	
2024	P2		
2024	Meiyazhagan	Ekambaram	
2024	Viduthalai Part 2	PWD Minister Ilavarasu	
2024	Thiru.Manickam	Sumathi's uncle	
2025	Mr. Housekeeping	Chokkalingam	
2025	Poorveegam		
2025	Baby and Baby	Muthaiya	
2025	Nizharkudai	Police Inspector	
2025	Chennai City Gangsters	Minister Sengundran	
2025	Flashback		Only the Hindi dubbed version was released.
2025	Padaiyaanda Maaveeraa	Inspector Muthuramalingam	
2025	Idli Kadai	Ramarajan	
2026	Thalaivar Thambi Thalaimaiyil	Ilavarasu	
2026	Thaai Kizhavi	Gold Kumar	
2026	Vengeance	CM Velu	
2026	TN 2026	Treasurer	
2026	Singgaramm		

==== Other language films ====
Year	Title	Role	Language	Notes
2012	Ozhimuri	Vaidyan	Malayalam	
2013	Pattam Pole	Karthik's uncle	Malayalam	
2017	Mayaanadhi	Police Inspector Ilavarasu	Malayalam	
2022	Jana Gana Mana	Anbumani	Malayalam	
2024	Max	Ravanan	Kannada	
2025	Thudarum	Ilavarasu	Malayalam	
2025	Kalamkaval	Nandhakumar	Malayalam	

==== Television ====
Year	Title	Role	Channel	Notes
2022	Anandha Ragam	Shanmugavel	Sun TV	Extended Guest Appearance
2025-present	Nadu Center	Kaali's father	JioHotstar	

=== As cinematographer ===
Year	Film	Notes
1996	Panchalankurichi	
1997	Periya Thambi	
1998	Ninaithen Vandhai	
1998	Iniyavale	
1999	Manam Virumbuthe Unnai	Winner, Tamil Nadu State Film Award for Best Cinematographer
2000	Veeranadai	
2000	Sabhash	
2000	Eazhaiyin Sirippil	
2001	Love Marriage	
2009	Ajantha	Multilingual film
2010	Sura	Uncredited; assistant cinematographer

=== As dubbing artist ===
Year	Film	Actor	Notes
1994	Karuththamma	Ponvannan	
1996	Panchalankurichi	Mahanadi Shankar	
