= Bilaspur–Chennai Central Superfast Express =

Train in India

Bilaspur-Chennai Central Superfast Express
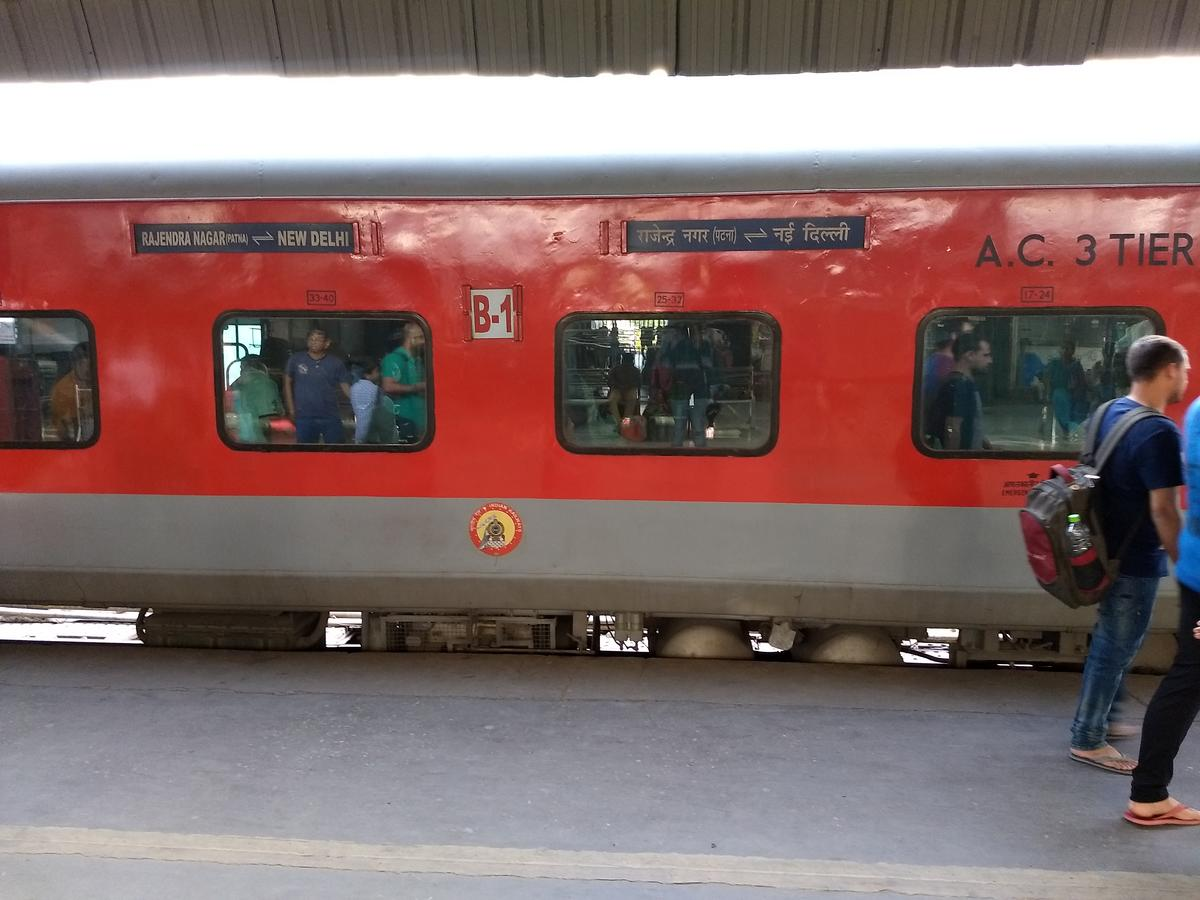
- Bilaspur-Chennai Express at Balharshah Station

Overview
- Service type: Superfast
- First service: 1 October 2006; 19 years ago
- Current operator: South East Central Railway

Route
- Termini: Bilaspur Junction (BSP); Chennai Central (MAS)
- Stops: 19
- Distance travelled: 1,415 km (879 mi)
- Average journey time: 23 hrs 15 mins
- Service frequency: Weekly (Note: Runs one day in a week for every direction.)
- Train number: 12851 / 12852

On-board services
- Classes: AC 1st, AC 2 tier, AC 3 tier, Sleeper Class, Pantry, General Unreserved, Luggage.
- Seating arrangements: Yes
- Sleeping arrangements: Yes
- Catering facilities: On-board Catering, E-Catering
- Observation facilities: Large windows
- Baggage facilities: No
- Other facilities: Below the seats

Technical
- Rolling stock: LHB coach
- Track gauge: 1,676 mm (5 ft 6 in)
- Electrification: Yes
- Operating speed: 61 km/h (38 mph) average including halts
Route map
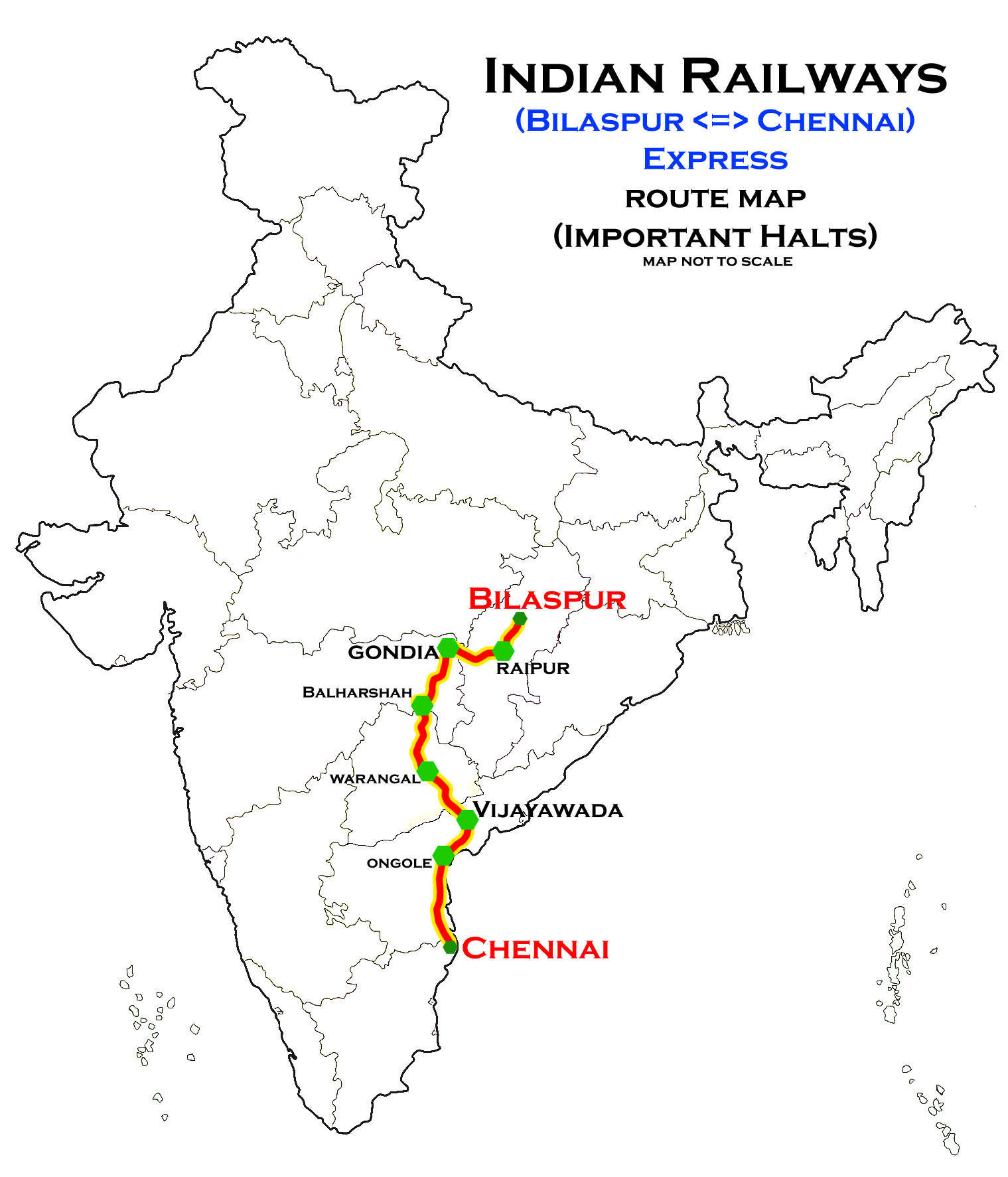

The 12851 / 12852 Bilaspur–Chennai Central Superfast Express is a Superfast Express train belonging to South East Central Railway zone that runs between Bilaspur Junction and Chennai Central in India. It is currently being operated with 12851/12852 train numbers on a weekly basis.

== Service ==
The 12851/Bilaspur-Chennai Central Weekly SF Express has an average speed of 59 km/h and covers 1415 km in 24h. The 12852/Chennai Central-Bilaspur Weekly SF Express has an average speed of 61 km/h and covers 1415 km in 23h 5m. People are demanding this train to be extended to Rameswaram so it would be the first train to connect Chhattisgarh to Rameswaram.

== Route and halts ==
The important halts of the train are:

- Bilaspur Junction
- Raipur Junction
- Durg Junction
- Rajnandgaon
- Gondia Junction
- Arjuni
- Wadsa
- Balharshah Junction
- Warangal
- Vijayawada Junction
- Gudur Junction
- Tiruvottiyur
- Chennai Central

== Coach composite ==
The train has standard LHB rakes with a maximum speed of 110 km/h. The train consists of 22 coaches:

- 1 AC First cum AC Two Tier
- 1 AC II Tier
- 4 AC III Tier
- 1 Pantry Car
- 10 Sleeper Coaches
- 2 General Unreserved
- 2 EOG

EOG GS GS S1 S2 S3 S4 S5 S6 S7 S8 S9 S10 PC B4 B3 B2 B1 A1 HA1 EOG

== Traction ==
From 10 June 2018, Bilaspur chennai S/F express was hauled by an electric locomotive, as Gondia Balharshah section electrification is now completed. WAP-7 Bhilai is a regular link for this train now for both the sides.

== Rake sharing ==
The train shares its rake with 12849/12850 Bilaspur - Pune Superfast Express.

== See also ==
- Bilaspur Junction railway station
- Chennai Central railway station
- Bilaspur - Pune Superfast Express
