= Aranaiyur =

- Village
- Location in Tamil Nadu, India Aranaiyur (India)
- Coordinates: 9.63°N 78.63°E
- Country: India
- State: Tamil Nadu
- District: Sivaganga
- Elevation: 45 m (148 ft)

Population (2001)
  - Total: 1,348

Language
  - Official: Tamil
- Time zone: UTC+5:30 (IST)
- PIN: 630702
- Telephone code: 914564

Aranaiyur is a village situated in the Sivagangai District in the Indian state of Tamil Nadu. It is near the towns of Paramakudi and Ilaiyangudi and has a population of 1348 people.

== Notable people ==
- Seeman (born 1966), film actor and politician
