= Bilaspur–Pune Express =

Train in India

Bilaspur–Pune Superfast Express
Overview
- Service type: Superfast
- First service: 4 July 2008; 17 years ago
- Current operator: South East Central Railways

Route
- Termini: Bilaspur (BSP); Pune (PUNE)
- Stops: 17
- Distance travelled: 1,302 km (809 mi)
- Average journey time: 22h 20m
- Service frequency: Weekly (Note: Runs one day in a week for every direction.)
- Train number: 12849 / 12850

On-board services
- Classes: AC 1st, AC 2 tier, AC 3 tier, Sleeper class, General Unreserved
- Seating arrangements: Yes
- Sleeping arrangements: Yes
- Catering facilities: On-board catering E-catering
- Observation facilities: Large Windows
- Baggage facilities: No
- Other facilities: Below the seats

Technical
- Rolling stock: LHB coach
- Track gauge: 1,676 mm (5 ft 6 in)
- Operating speed: 59 km/h (37 mph) average including halts

The 12849 / 12850 Bilaspur–Pune Superfast Express is a superfast train belonging to South East Central Railway zone that runs between Bilaspur Junction and Pune Junction in India. It is currently being operated with 12849/12850 train numbers on a weekly basis.

== Service ==
12849 Bilaspur–Pune Superfast Express has an average speed of 59 km/h and covers 1302 km in 22h 10m. The 12850 Pune–Bilaspur Superfast Express has an average speed of 56 km/h and covers 1302 km in 23h 10m.

== Route and halts ==
The important halts of the train are:

- Bilaspur
- Bhatapara
- Raipur
- Durg
- Rajnandgaon
- Gondia
- Nagpur
- Wardha
- Badnera
- Akola
- Bhusaval Junction
- Jalgaon
- Manmad
- Kopargaon
- Ahilyanagar
- Daund Junction
- Pune Junction

== Coach composition ==
The train has standard ICF rakes with max speed of 110 kmph. The train consists of 22 coaches:

- 1st AC cum AC II Tier
- 1 AC II Tier
- 4 AC III Tier
- 10 Sleeper coaches
- 2 General Unreserved
- 2 EOG

== Traction ==
Both trains are hauled by a Bhilai-based WAP-7 electric locomotive from Bilaspur to Daund Junction, After that a Bhusawal-based WAP-4 locomotive powers the train to its remainder journey until Pune and vice versa.

== Rake sharing ==
The train shares its rake with 12851/12852 Bilaspur–Chennai Central Superfast Express.

== Direction reversal ==
The train reverses its direction 1 times:

- Daund Junction

== See also ==
- Bilaspur Junction railway station
- Pune Junction railway station
- Bilaspur–Chennai Central Superfast Express
