= Tiruvottiyur =

Thiruvottriyur
- Neighbourhood
- Location within Chennai Location within Tamil Nadu Location within India
- Coordinates: 13.16°N 80.3°E
- Country: India
- State: Tamil Nadu
- District: Chennai
- Taluk: Tiruvottiyur
- Metro: Chennai
- Zone: Chennai
- Elevation: 0 m (0 ft)

Population (2011)
  - Total: 249,446

Languages
  - Official: Tamil
- Time zone: UTC+5:30 (IST)
- Postal code: 600019
- Vehicle registration: TN-03 & TN-20(old)

Tiruvottriyur (TVT) is a neighbourhood in North Chennai, administered by the Greater Chennai Corporation. It is part of the Tondiarpet division, located to the north of Chennai. It is one of the fifteen administrative zones in the Greater Chennai Corporation. The zone is called Zone 1 (Tiruvottriyur).

Tiruvottriyur has industrial units, trading activity, and nearby fishing hamlets. The area is easily accessible by Metropolitan Transport Corporation (MTC) buses from across the city and has a bus terminus. The area is also served by the Tiruvottiyur railway junction of the Chennai Suburban Railway Network. As of 2011, the neighbourhood had a population of 249,446.

== History ==
Historical population
Year	Pop.	±%
1901	15,919	—
2001	212,281	+1233.5%
2011	249,446	+17.5%
Sources: Imperial Gazetter of India, Volume 21. Clarendon Press. 1908.

Along with Avadi, Ambattur, Sembium, and Ennore, Tiruvottiyur is part of the "auto belt" in the city's industrial north and west regions that developed when the automobile industry developed in Madras during the early post-World War II years. In earlier days, Tiruvottiyur was known as Ottriyur since it was near the center of Chennai city. In April 2018, the state government transferred Tiruvottiyur to an expanded Chennai district.

== Geography ==
Tiruvottiyur is located at 13.16°N 80.3°E. It is an esplanade located on the shores of Bay of Bengal. Sea encroachment was a major problem for fishermen before the building of Groynes started in 2004. The groynes, put up over a length of 4 km, vary in length from 165 to 300 metres each, with a height four meters above the mean sea level. As the years have passed, some acres have been reclaimed with the formation of a beach as predicted.

As of 2018, the Tiruvottiyur zone, along with the Tondiarpet zone, has a green cover of under 10 percent, below the city's 14.9 percent average. This was chiefly because of numerous industrial units, mills, power plants, refineries, fishing harbours, and docks.

== Demographics ==
Religious census - 2011
Religion	Percent(%)
Hindu	83.7%
Muslim	6.93%
Christian	8.56%
Sikh	0.07%
Buddhist	0.04%
Jain	0.15%
Other	0.52%
No religion	0.03%

According to the 2011 census, Tiruvottiyur had a population of 249,446, with a ratio of 991 females for every 1,000 males, much higher than the national average of 929. A total of 26,903 were under the age of six, constituting 13,782 males and 13,121 females. Scheduled castes and scheduled tribes accounted for 14.16% and .2% of the population, respectively. The average literacy of the town was 79.03%, greater than the national average of 72.99%. The town had a total of 63,862 households. There were a total of 94,000 workers, comprising 451 cultivators, 509 main agricultural labourers, 1,568 in house hold industries, 78,522 other workers, 12,950 marginal workers, 163 marginal cultivators, 136 marginal agricultural labourers, 612 marginal workers in household industries and 12,039 other marginal workers. As per the religious census of 2011, Tiruvottiyur was composed of 83.7% Hindus, 6.93% Muslims, 8.56% Christians, 0.07% Sikhs, 0.04% Buddhists, 0.15% Jains, 0.52% following other religions and 0.03% who followed no religion or did not indicate any religious preference.

During 2001–2011, the population of Tiruvottiyur rose to 248,059, registering a decadal growth of 17 percent.

== Politics ==
Thiruvottiyur (state assembly constituency) is part of the Chennai North (Lok Sabha constituency). Tiruvotriyur K P Shankar (from DMK) is the Member of the Legislative Assembly from Thiruvottiyur; he was elected on 7 May 2021 to the 16th Tamil Nadu Assembly.

== Economy ==
Larger employers in Tiruvottiyur include MRF, Royal Enfield, which has been based in Tiruvottiyur for decades, and ITC (including WIMCO). Other industries include, KCP, CPCL, IOCL, SAIL, Inox Air, MFL present in Manali which is an industrial and residential suburb near Tiruvottriyur.

Thiruvottiyur is one of the more heavily populated locations in Chennai. It has few major industrial establishments, and is supported by numerous small-scale industries. A majority of the city's population are reliant on these industries for their daily labor. Apart from industries, the other primary source of income for the people is business. The fishing industry is also significant.

== Landmarks ==
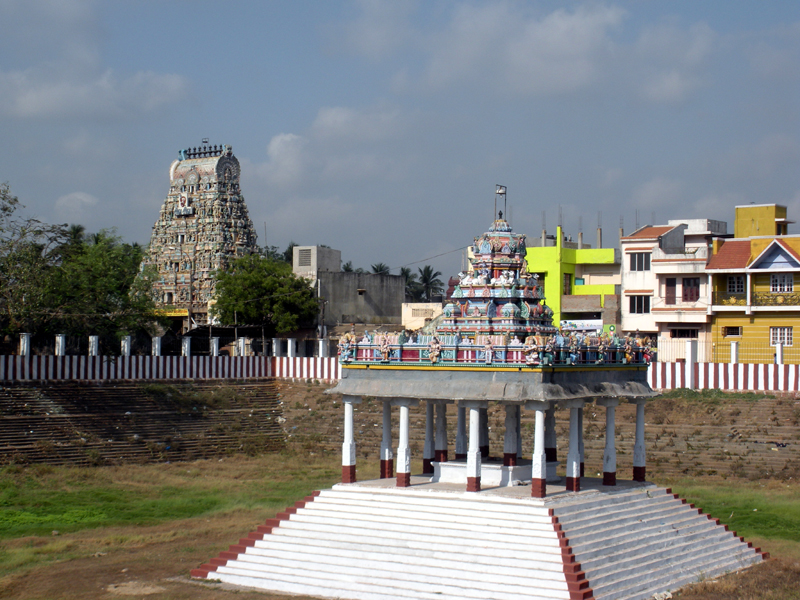
The tower of Thiyagarajaswamy Temple as seen from the Theppakulam (temple pond)

Tiruvottiyur's landmarks include Thiyagarajaswamy Temple (Vadivudaiamman Temple), Varadharaja Perumal Temple and the Pattinathar Temple.

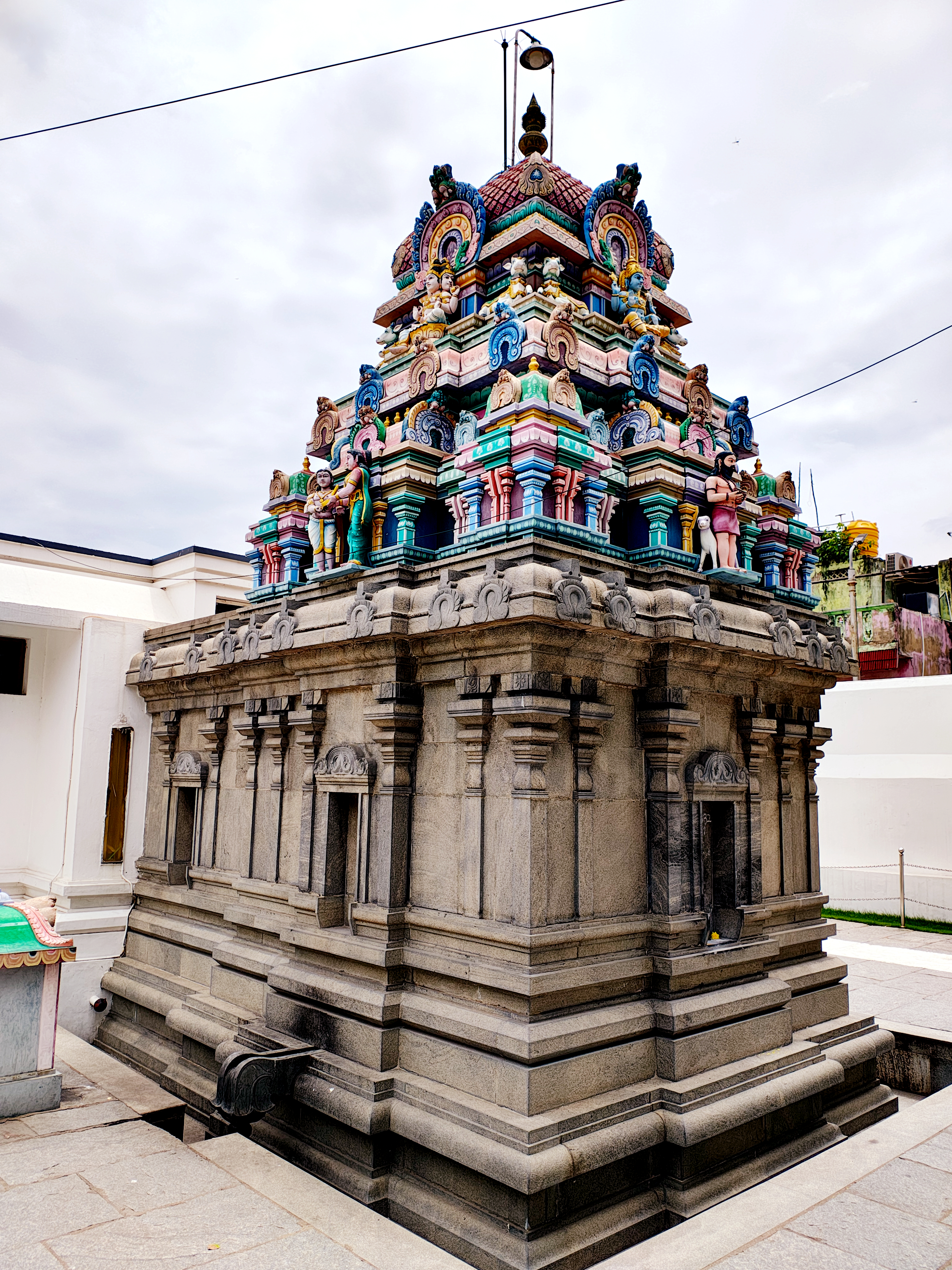
Pattinathar Temple, Tiruvottiyur

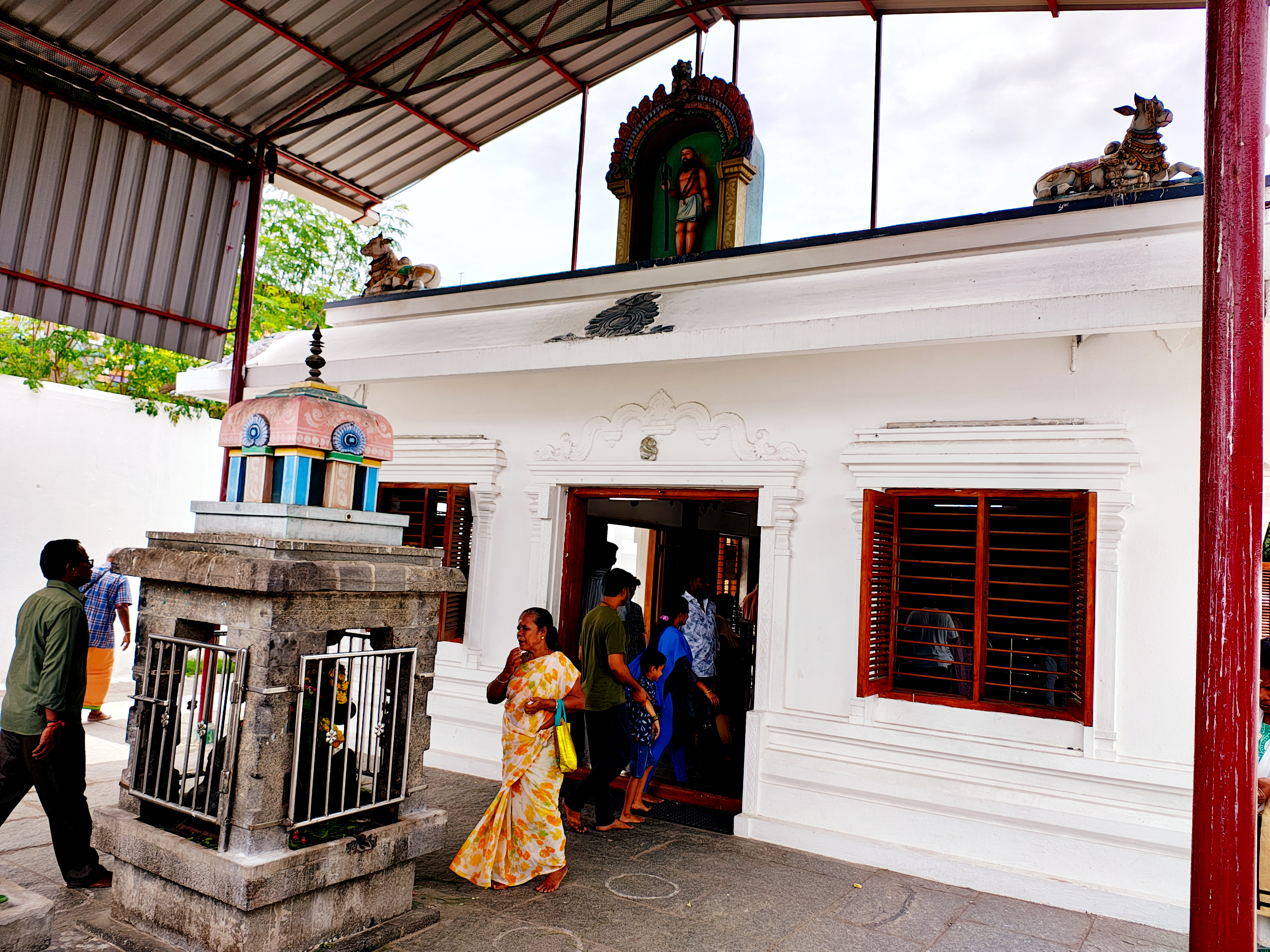
Tiruvottiyur Pattinathar Temple Entrance

== Notable residents ==
- Vagisa Munivar
