= Na. Muthuswamy =

Indian art director

Na Muthuswamy
- Born: 1936; Punjai village, Tanjore District, Madras Province, British India (now Thanjavur, Tamil Nadu, India)
- Died: 24 October 2018 (aged 82); Chennai, Tamil Nadu, India
- Awards: Sangeet Natak Akademi Award (2000), Padma Shri (2012)
- Website: www.koothu-p-pattarai.org

Padma Shri Na Muthuswamy (1936 – 24 October 2018) was the art director of Tamil folk theatre group Koothu-P-Pattarai, which is based in Chennai, Tamil Nadu in South India.

Muthuswamy has been described by The Hindu as "the master of the avant-garde". Muthusamy also made his first film appearance in Vaazhthugal (2008).

== Biography ==
Na Muthuswamy was born in Punjai, Thanjavur district, Tamil Nadu. In late 1950's Muthuswamy moved to Chennai in search of opportunities.

== Death ==
He died on 24 October 2018 at the age of 82.

== Awards ==
- 2000: Received Sangeet Natak Akademi Award from the Government of India.
- 2012: Received Padma Shri from the Government of India.
