= Kalyana Varadharaja Perumal Temple (Thiruvottiyur) =

Varadharaja Perumal Temple
- Varadharaja Perumal Temple, Tiruvottiyur, Chennai, Tamil Nadu

Religion
- Affiliation: Hinduism
- District: Chennai
- Deity: Kalyana Varadaraja Perumal (Vishnu); Perundevi; Pavala Vannar

Location
- Location: Thiruvotriyur, Chennai
- State: Tamil Nadu
- Country: India
- Interactive map of Varadharaja Perumal Temple
- Coordinates: 13.1534°N 80.2966°E

Architecture
- Type: Dravidian architecture
- Elevation: 29.56 m (97 ft)

Varadharaja Perumal temple is a Vishnu temple located at Kaladipet in Thiruvottiyur. This temple is located near Thyagaraja Swamy temple, Thiruvottiyur. This temple was historically known as Padmapuram and is estimated to be 500 years old. Perundevi shrine is located left to that of the Lord. The shrines for Navagrahas are installed on a stage designed as lotus petal. Magizham tree is the Thala Virutcham of the temple and Vaikanasam is the pooja.

== General Information ==
The Vimana of the Lord's shrine is of the Trikala design. Gopuja (cow worship) is performed daily before the shrine of the Lord. Lord Sri Rama, Mother Sri Andal, Sri Anjaneya and Sri Chakarathalwar-the deity of the discus of the Lord grace from separate shrines in the temple. Theerthavari festival is celebrated in Vaikasi-May–June. The temple is situated so centrally that the devotees can also conveniently visit the Thyagaraja temple, North faced Lord Dakshinamurthy temple and Pattinathar temple. A devotee cannot afford to miss these temples.

== Temple History ==
In the early 1700s, Chennai was under the governance of British East India Company and Joseph Collett was the President of Madras(Chennai). Vijayaraghavachariar, a Visnhu devote, was a trusted administrator of Joseph Collett. Vijayaraghavachariar began his daily work only after worshipping Pavalavanna Perumal in Kancheepuram. As he was traveling to Kancheepuram daily, Joseph Collett gave money for the construction of this temple near Madras (Chennai) for the convenience of his trusted agent. Upon the completion of the construction of the temple, the area was named after Joseph Collett as Colletpet, which later changed to Kaladipet. Vijayaraghavachariar continued the Kancheepuram visit. When questioned by Collett, he said that the beauty of the procession deity drew him there. Collett arranged to bring that deity here. Pavalavanna Nather told his devotee that he did not differ in appearance anywhere to His devotees. "I am in the hearts of my devotees" He said. Vijayaraghavachariar rendered his services to his Lord throughout his lifetime.

== Speciality of Temple ==
The Pavalavanna Perumal procession deity of the temple enjoys a special reputation in the temple with a staff in His left hand. The wedding festival is celebrated on the Panguni Uthiram day. He comes to the Mandap with Mothers Sridevi and Bhoodevi before the Mother Perundevi shrine where the festival is celebrated. Throughout the day Perumal grants darshan with Mother. After special Tirumanjanam, He returns to the sanctum sanctorum. During the wedding festival, those facing wedding problems offer unstripped coconut as nivedhana(offering), take it home and do pujas in the faith that their wedding would soon happen. As Perumal grants wedding boon, He is praised as Kalyana Varadaraja Perumal – Wedding Boon Perumal.

A 9-day festival in connection with Sri Rama Navami (Lord Sri Rama's birthday) is celebrated in the temple. As this is celebrated after the birth of Sri Rama, this is called Janana Utsav. In this temple, this festival begins 9 days earlier and ends on Navami the birthday of the Lord, hence called Garba Utsav (Utsav when the Lord was in Mother Kausalya's womb). The coronation of Sri Rama is celebrated on this day. Earlier, it was an 18-day Garba and Birth Utsav covering both the periods. Now, the Garba Utsav only is celebrated.

== Festival ==
The festivals of the temple are,

Thiruvottiyur Varadharaja Perumal Temple
S. No.	Festival	Month
1	10 day Acharya Sri Ramanuja Vizha	April–May
2	Vaikasi Brahmmotsava	May–June
3	Krishna Jayanthi	August–September
4	Masi Magam	February–March
5	Panguni Uthiram	March–April
