= Pasumpon =

- Poster
- Directed by: Bharathiraja
- Screenplay by: Bharathiraja
- Story by: Seeman
- Produced by: V. Mohan; V. Natarajan
- Starring: Prabhu; Sivaji Ganesan; Sivakumar; Radhika; Saranya Ponvannan
- Cinematography: Ilavarasu
- Edited by: K. Pazhanivel
- Music by: Vidyasagar
- Production company: Ananthi Films
- Distributed by: GV Films
- Release date: 14 April 1995
- Running time: 135 minutes
- Country: India
- Language: Tamil

Pasumpon is a 1995 Indian Tamil-language drama film directed by Bharathiraja. The film stars Prabhu, Sivaji Ganesan, Sivakumar, Radhika and Saranya Ponvannan, Ponvannan, Vignesh, Vadivelu, and Ilavarasu play supporting roles. It was released on 14 April 1995. The film was remade in Telugu as Pedababu.

== Plot ==
For several years, Thangapandi has been in a feud with his stepbrothers Sellasamy and Raasa.

In the past, Durairasu Thevar, the village chief, was very rich and highly respected in his area. His only heir, Nachiyar, married a rich man in the neighboring village as per Durairasu's wishes. A few years later, Nachiyar has a son, Thangapandi. Within weeks of Thangapandi's birth, Nachiyar's husband dies, and Durairasu becomes distraught. Seeing the young widow, his health deteriorates. He then forces her daughter to remarry her maternal cousin Kathiresan Thevar, so that she may have a safe life. Thangapandi, who was eight years old by then, hated his stepfather. Two years later, Nachiyar has another son, and Thangapandi became jealous of the newborn Sellasamy. He left the house and decided to live with his grandfather Durairasu in a grand house on the same street. After Durairasu's death, the conflict has hardened. Thangapandi manages all of the properties left by his grandfather and refuses to acknowledge that his mother is alive.

The liquor smuggler Angusamy hates Thangapandi since the latter once beat him up in public. Sellasamy wants to get married as soon as possible after his uncle Angusamy convinced him to, but it is disrespectful not to arrange the marriage for the elder son first. Finally, Sellasamy gets married before Thangapandi.

Meanwhile, Malar is in love with her cousin Thangapandi, and he proposes to her. At Thangapandi's marriage, Nachiyar secretly comes to see it and witnesses how her son Thangapandi secretly loves her. When Sellasamy and his family go to Angusamy's house to ask for his daughter's hand for Raasa, a fight breaks out, and Thangapandi comes to the aid of his brothers. The younger brothers realize the worth of their elder brother.

The next day, Thangapandi gets a widow with a baby boy married to her cousin, whom she loves, to protect the girl's future. Malar cites that the same was done 25 years ago by his grandfather, and it has become old enough for Thangapandi to accept his mother and step-family. This puts Thangapandi into deep thought. Later, Nachiyar falls ill due to a head injury in the fight, and Thangapandi feeds her the last milk to end her suffering. The family reconciles.

== Cast ==
- Sivaji Ganesan as Durairasu Thevar
- Prabhu as Thangapandi
- Sivakumar as Kathiresan Thevar
- Radhika as Nachiyar
- Saranya Ponvannan as Malar (voice-over by Revathi)
- Ponvannan as Sellasamy
- Vignesh as Raasa
- Vadivelu as Sonnaiya
- Ilavarasu as Angusamy
- Yuvarani as Thenmozhi
- Shenbagam as Paramakudiya
- Dubbing Janaki as Chellathayi, Malar's mother
- S. R. Vijaya as Angusamy's wife
- Periya Karuppu Thevar as Accountant

== Production ==
Bharathiraja initially launched a film called Thiruvizha with Prabhu in lead; however the film failed to proceed after the launch. Bharathiraja then launched a different film with Prabhu and Sivaji Ganesan which eventually became Pasumpon. Although B. Kannan shot the film, his assistant Ilavarasu was credited as the cinematographer.

== Soundtrack ==
The soundtrack was composed by Vidyasagar, with lyrics written by Vairamuthu. The tune of the song "Thamarai Poovukkum" was later reused in the song "Ishq Mein Pyar Mein" in the Hindi film Hulchul (2004) which also had music by Vidyasagar. "Thamarai Poovukkum" also features in the 2023 Tamil film Leo during its café fight sequence.

Song	Singer(s)	Duration
"Adi Aathi"	K. S. Chithra, Jayachandran, Sujatha Mohan	5:00
"Aele Aele" (male)	Malaysia Vasudevan	2:47
"Aele Aele" (female)	Swarnalatha	2:47
"Marudhaani Vachu"	S. P. Balasubrahmanyam, Swarnalatha	4:27
"Thamarai Poovukum"	Sujatha Mohan, Krishnachandran	5:24
"Vada Thangam Vada"	K. S. Chithra	4:00
"Thennattu Singame Thevarayya"	Pushpavanam Kuppusamy, Anuradha Sriram, Kalpana Raghavendar	4:00

== Reception ==
R. P. R. of Kalki wrote Bharathiraja, in this film, has squeezed out the struggle of affection, so we can hope that he will come out from that phase in the next one.
