= Vaazhthugal =

- Theatrical release poster
- Directed by: Senthamizhan Seeman
- Written by: Senthamizhan Seeman
- Produced by: T. Siva; Arunamaheswari
- Starring: Madhavan; Bhavana
- Cinematography: B. L. Sanjay
- Edited by: K. Pazhanivel
- Music by: Yuvan Shankar Raja
- Production company: Amma Creations
- Distributed by: Pyramid Saimira
- Release date: 15 January 2008
- Running time: 151 minutes
- Country: India
- Language: Tamil

Vaazhthugal (transl. Congratulations) is a 2008 Indian Tamil-language romantic drama film written and directed by Senthamizhan Seeman, in his last directorial work before his entry into politics. The film stars Madhavan and Bhavana, along with Venkat Prabhu, Ilavarasu, Mallika Sukumaran, Na. Muthuswamy and R. K., who play supporting roles. Produced by T. Siva for Amma Creations with music scored by Yuvan Shankar Raja, Vaazhthugal was released on 15 January 2008, during Pongal.

== Plot ==
Kadhiravan, a successful entrepreneur and socially responsible individual, manages his software company, Amma Menporul. His parents are searching for a prospective bride for him, but Kadhiravan's priorities are put to the test when he encounters his friend Kabilan's parents at an orphanage, where he is organising a food drive. Kabilan's parents have been forced to leave their home by their daughter-in-law, Shalini, who finds them uncomfortable to live with. Kadhiravan confronts Kabilan, who laments his inability to decide. This incident prompts Kadhiravan to look for a partner who will care for his parents. While watching a TV program, he is impressed by Kayalvizhi "Kayal", a college student from TNAU, Coimbatore, who shares her aspirations of being an ideal wife, mother, and daughter-in-law.

Kayal's emphasis on the importance of her large and loving family resonates with Kadhiravan, and he feels she might be the right partner for him. Kayal belongs to a big joint family, consisting of her grandfather Selvanayagam, her three uncles, and their wives. Determined to win Kayal's heart, Kadhiravan travels to Coimbatore with his friend Kalai. However, meeting her in college doesn't yield the desired results. His plan to send thousands of greeting cards also fails. Kadhiravan notices an advertisement by Kayal's grandfather, Selvanayagam, seeking quotations to renovate their traditional home. He sees this as an opportunity to enter Kayal's life and decides to learn interior designing from Vennila, a leading expert in Coimbatore, to make his approach genuine. Posing as an interior designer, Kadhiravan gains entry into Kayal's home and wins the hearts of her family members with his good nature. Kayal, too, develops feelings for him, but Kadhiravan keeps his true identity hidden from her family.

As the project nears completion, Vennila realises that Kayal is falling for Kadhiravan. After a conversation with Vennila, Kayal discovers that Kadhiravan took on the job solely to win her love, and she soon reciprocates his feelings. However, their relationship is put to the test when Kadhiravan and Kayal encounter a group of thugs in Kerala, leading to a trip to the police station. When the police contact Kayal's family, they realise that she is in love with Kadhiravan. Kayal's family, who claim to be orthodox and believe that love marriages are doomed to fail, reject her union with Kadhiravan. Instead of restricting her, they provide her with a car and give her the freedom to do as she wishes, but with the expectation that she will prioritise the family's reputation. Kadhiravan, who wants to marry Kayal with her family's blessings, faces opposition from her uncles, who send goons to attack him. Despite being beaten by Kayal's uncles, Kadhiravan chooses not to retaliate, instead seeing their actions as a manifestation of their love for Kayal.

Kayal pleads with her family to accept Kadhiravan, but they remain stubborn in their refusal. When Selvanayagam plans to marry Kayal to her cousin Mugilan, Mugilan's father, Vetriselvan, refuses, suspecting that Kayal may have consummated with Kadhiravan. This creates a rift within the family, and Kayal's three uncles leave the house, citing public disrespect due to Kayal's love for Kadhiravan. Kayal's father, Thirunavukkarasu, pleads with his brothers-in-law to stay, but they depart with their families. Kayal and her parents also leave the house. The house help, Mani, informs Kadhiravan about the situation, and he rushes to Kayal's house. However, upon arrival, Kadhiravan finds Selvanayagam having a heart attack and manages to ruch him to the hospital just in time, despite the family's resistance. Moved by the family's plight, Kadhiravan reveals that he loves Kayal and her entire family, regrets potentially causing the family split, and even offers to renounce his love for Kayal to reunite her family.

Overwhelmed, Kayal bursts into tears as Kadhiravan apologises and leaves. Kadhiravan returns to his home in Chennai but is surprised to find his home decorated and Kayal's entire family waiting to welcome him. In a dramatic turn, Selvanayagam and the rest of Kayal's family have undergone a change of heart, accepting Kayal's marriage to Kadhiravan. The two finally unite, bringing joy to both families.

== Cast ==
- Madhavan as T. Kadhiravan
- Bhavana as Kayalvizhi "Kayal"
- Ilavarasu as Thirunavukkarasu, Kayal's father
- RK as Vetriselvan Selvanayagam, Kayal's uncle
- Deva
- Na. Muthuswamy as Selvanayagam
- Trotsky Marudu as Kadhiravan's father
- T. Velmurugan as Tamizhkumaran, Kayal's uncle
- Venkat Prabhu as Kalai, Kadhiravan's friend
- Kicha as Mani, Kayal's house help
- Tamil Muzhakkam Shahul Hameed
- Anbu Thennarasu
- Mohammad Iqbal
- Ajay
- Jintha
- Vijayalakshmi as Vennila, Interior designer
- Mallika Sukumaran as Kadhiravan's mother
- Gayathri
- Sujatha Panchu as Amudhavalli, Kayal's aunt
- Kalpana Shri as Kanimozhi, Kayal's aunt
- Nisha
- Devi Shri
- Mu Ramaswamy as Subbaiyah, Selvanayagam's friend
- Sai Baba as Kabilan, Kadhiravan's friend
- Harris Moosa as Cheralathan, Vennila's husband
- Narayanan
- Revathi Sankaran as Kabilan's mother
- Tinki
- T. Siva as a Doctor
- Kottachi(special appearance)

== Production ==
After collaborating on Thambi (2006), director Seeman and actor Madhavan decided to work on two more projects titled Vaazhthugal and Pagalavan, although the latter project was dropped. Venkat Prabhu later joined the cast of Vaazhthugal, making a return to acting after a sabbatical as he had been focussing on direction.

The film began production in April 2007, and was shot in locations including Coimbatore, Pollachi, Udumalaipettai, and Kerala. It notably features no English dialogue, given the director's passion for the Tamil language.

== Soundtrack ==
Music was composed by Yuvan Shankar Raja and the lyrics were provided by Na. Muthukumar. The soundtrack was released on 3 January 2008. The lyrics of the song "Muzhumai Nila" were taken from a poem written by Bharathidasan. Saraswathy Srinivas of Rediff.com called it "A remarkable album that is worth listening to over and over again". Karthik of Milliblog wrote, "Vaazhthugal's music pales in front of other Yuvan soundtracks in 2007 and Seeman's earlier film with Vidyasagar's music (Thambi)".

Song	Singer(s)	Duration
"Enthan Vaanamum Neethan"	Haricharan, Mahathi	5:29
"Chinna Chinna"	Shweta Mohan	4:17
"Pookkal Rasithathu"	Haricharan, Ajindan	3:52
"Muzhumai Nila"	Sriram Parthasarathy, Mukesh	2:03
"Unmela Aasapattu"	S. P. Charan, Anuradha Sriram	4:00
"Kannil Vanthathum"	Haricharan, Dishanthan	5:15
"Enthan Vaanamum Neethan (Reprise)"	Rahul Nambiar, Rajalakshmi	5:27

== Release and reception ==
Vaazhthugal was released on 15 January 2008, during Pongal. Distributed by Pyramid Saimira, it was initially postponed to 26 January 2008, Republic Day, but later returned to the original date. Sify wrote, "Seeman's intentions to make Vazhthukkal were noble but his execution is tacky and the final outcome is a dreary and boring message film that leaves you exhausted! The flaw is not in the tale, it's in the telling — too many songs, conversations going nowhere, clichéd characters and a long drawn out 30 minutes tedious climax". Pavithra Srinivasan of Rediff.com wrote, "Seeman has obviously tried desperately, and failed to make a movie with a moral message for today's generation."

Madhumitha of Kalki praised the acting, music, cinematography and dialogues also for having heavy Tamil flavour but panned slow-paced scenes, predictable screenplay which seems to pull the film backward if this was avoided it would have been an unforgettable film. Malini Mannath of Chennai Online wrote that the film "begins promisingly enough, the earlier scenes focusing on the responsibility of children towards their aging parents, and the trauma the latter undergo when they are discarded by their progenies. But as the narration proceeds, the script loses it's [sic] focus, the director unable to maintain the same pace, feel and interest". Malathi Rangarajan of The Hindu wrote, "Colloquialism is a major casualty in Vaazhthugal and the contrived exchanges make even sincere performances appear unnatural. The result is that the filmgoer is unable to relate to the proceedings".
