= Koothu-P-Pattarai =

Tamil theatre group

- கூத்து-ப-பட்டறை
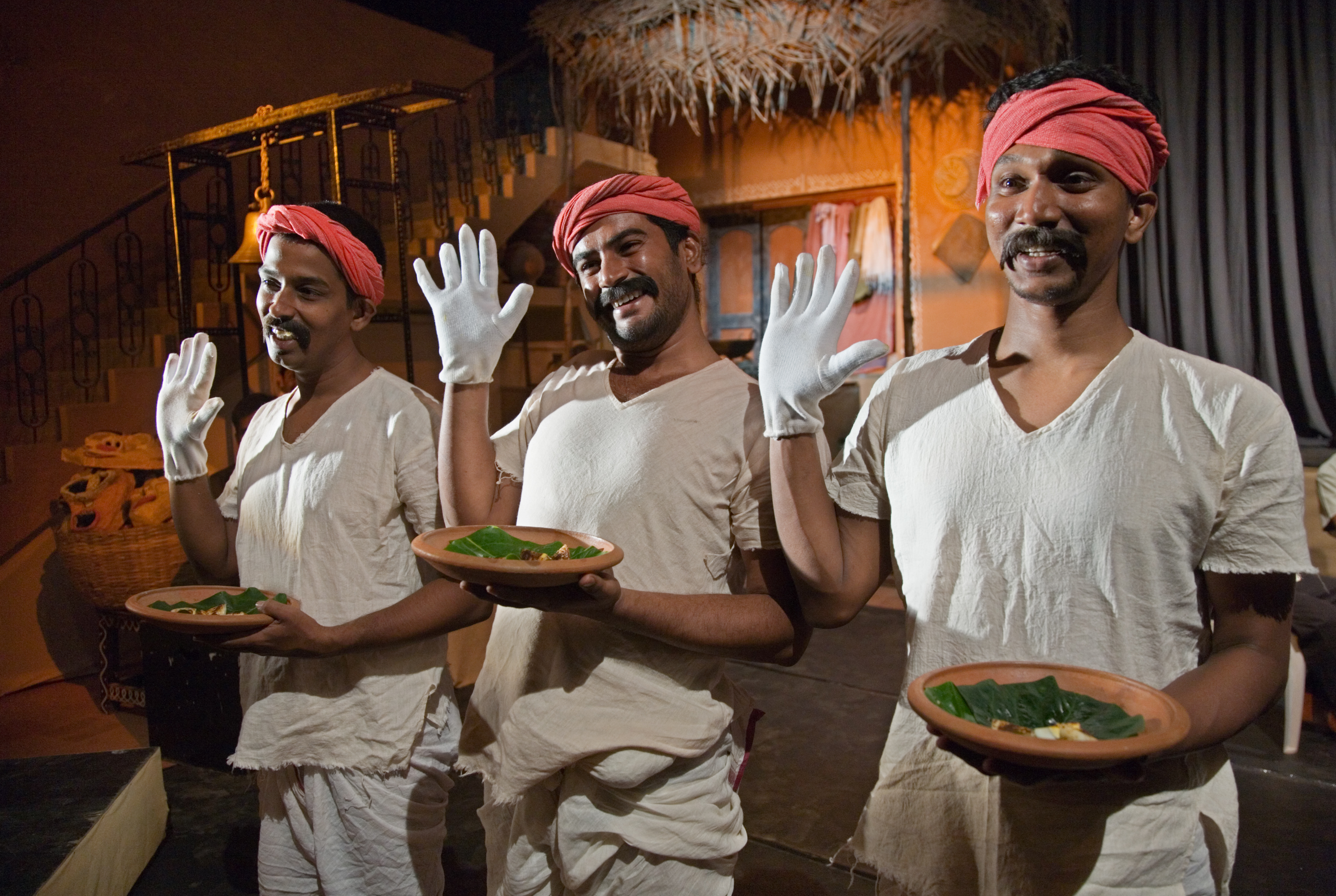
- Formation: 1977
- Type: Contemporary Theatre Group
- Location: Chennai, Tamil Nadu, India
- Artistic director: Na Muthuswamy (Late)
- Website: www.koothu-p-pattarai.org

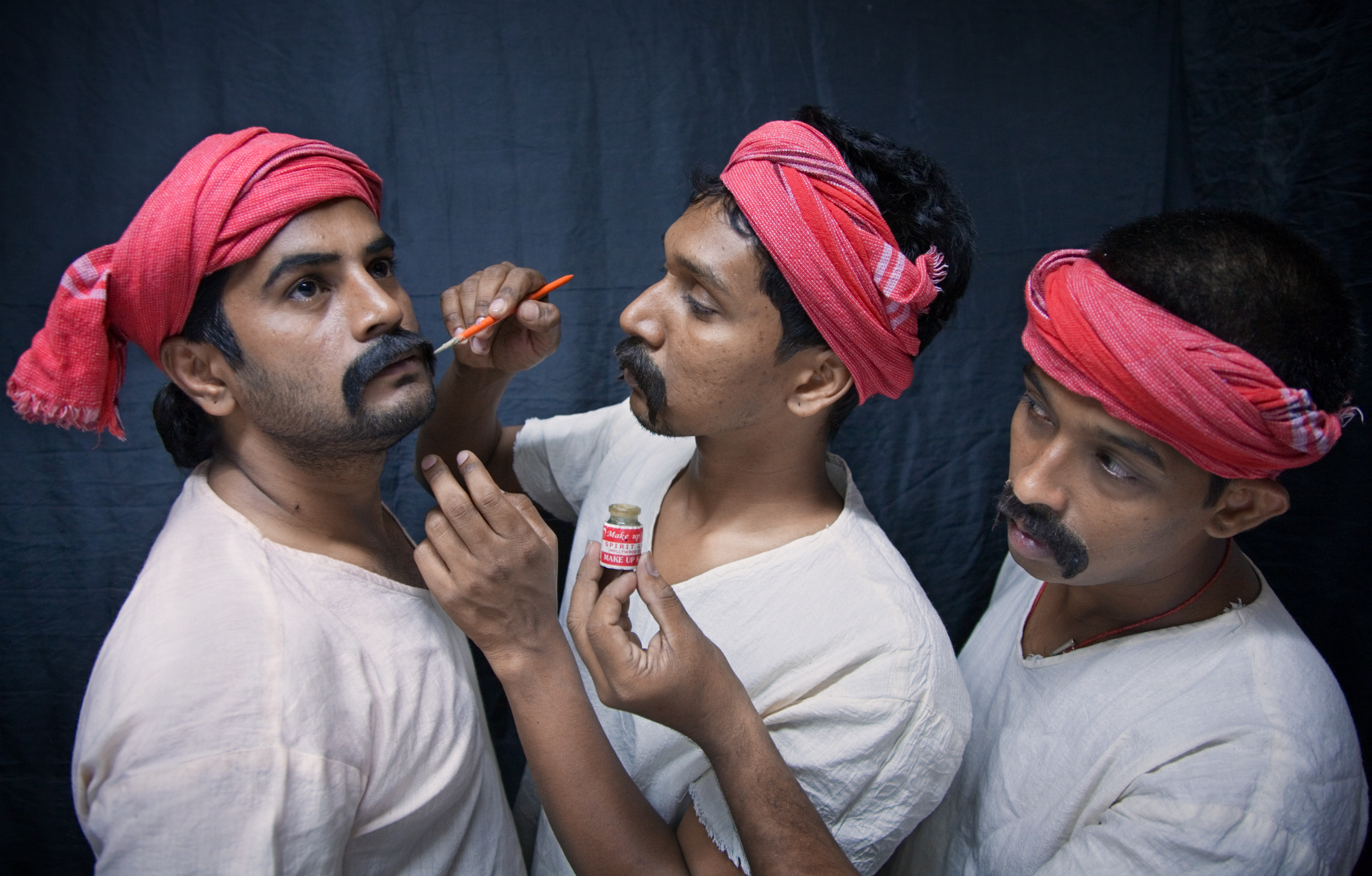
Actors in the process of applying make-up for a performance at the Kootu Pattarai theatre.

Koothu-P-Pattarai is a prominent Tamil theatre group founded in 1977 by Na Muthuswamy that has organised plays more than 30 years.The group has its base in Chennai, Tamil Nadu, India. It conducts speech training in a theatre speech laboratory and conducts workshops teaching "elements of traditional theatre art forms" as well as presenting lectures in educational institutions in order to raise awareness about folk theatre's significance to modern theatre.

Koothu-p-pattarai has been staging contemporary plays in Tamil for the past 30 years and has to its credit, over 65 major theatre productions, 575 stage shows, and over 80 collaborative workshops with the best theatre talents from all over the world.It is now a nodal research centre for performing arts in South India.

Koothu-P-Pattarai has received support from the Union ministry of culture, Ford Foundation, India Foundation for the Arts, Alliance Française de Madras and Chennai’s Goethe Institute.

The style of theatre has been described in The Hindu newspaper as "an intense physicality coupled with powerful ideas", and was described by India9.com as being "native folk arts in a contemporary style".

The director for this group Na Muthuswamy, was the recipient of the Sangeet Natak Akademi Award & Padma Shri from the Government of India.

Under Na Muthuswamy able direction, Koothu-p-pattarai staged many plays such as ‘England,’ ‘Appavum Pillaiyum,’ ‘Six Characters In Search Of An Author’ and ‘Macbeth.’

== UNESCO Recognition ==
They have been functioning as a full time Tamil theatre repertory since 1987. The UNESCO has identified us as one among the five learning centers for theatre and from 2000 to 2007, under the ASCHBERG program and have hosted one student for three months every year coming from any part of the world to study and teach theatre.

== Notable alumni ==
- George Maryan
- Kalairani
- Pasupathy
- Guru Somasundaram
- Vinodhini Vaidyanathan
- Vijay Sethupathi
- Vimal
- Vidharth
