= Thomas Vijayan =

Indian wildlife photographer

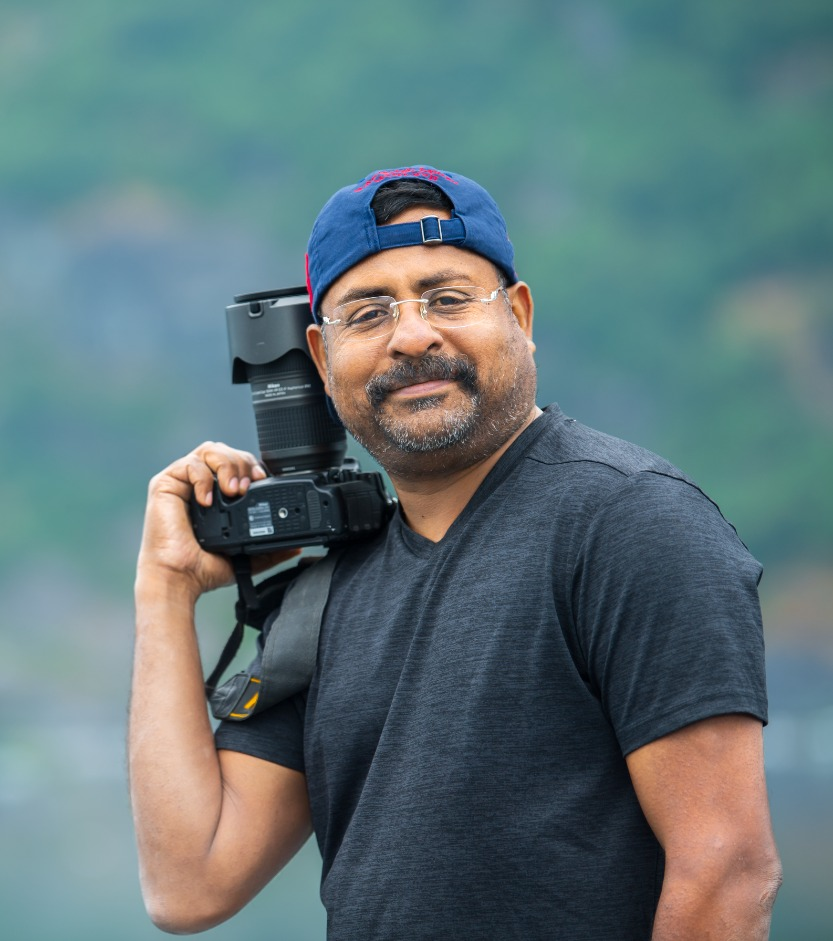
- Thomas Vijayan in 2020
- Born: 20th century Bangalore (now Bengaluru), Karnataka, India
- Occupations: Wildlife photographer and entrepreneur
- Website: thomasvijayan.com

Thomas Vijayan is an Indian wildlife photographer and businessman from Bangalore (now Bengaluru) who is based in Dubai.

== Biography ==
Vijayan is an architect, born and raised in Bangalore (now Bengaluru), India. Hailing from a photography family, he started photography at age ten. Later, he settled in Canada with his family.

In 2015, he was appointed as Nikon's first brand ambassador for the Middle East and Africa.

In 2016, Vijayan was the recipient of the Wildlife Photographer of the Year – People's Choice Award by the UK-based Natural History Museum, London for his picture titled Swinging Time. The picture was selected from 42,000 entries submitted from 96 different countries and has been added to the museum's special collection.

In 2019, Vijayan won top prize in the Society of International Nature and Wildlife Photographers Bird Photographer of the Year.

In 2020, he was the winner of a World Nature Photography Award.

== Awards ==
- PHOTO IS LIGHT – World Photography Contest 2021
- World Nature Photographer of the Year Award 2020
- Siena International Photo Awards 2020
- Moscow International Foto Awards (MIFA) 2020
- Tokyo International Foto Awards (TIFA) 2020 in Gold Category
- Windland Smith Rice Award 2019 for Nature's Best Photography
- First place in the Society of International Nature and Wildlife Photographers Bird Photographer of the Year 2019
- Wildlife Photographer of the Year 2017
