= P. Malaichamy =

Indian politician

P. Malaichamy was an Indian politician and former Member of the Legislative Assembly of Tamil Nadu. He was elected to the Tamil Nadu legislative assembly as a Dravida Munnetra Kazhagam candidate from Melur North constituency in 1967 election, and from Melur constituency in 1971 election.
