= Panchalankurichi (film) =

- Poster
- Directed by: Seeman
- Written by: Seeman
- Produced by: K. Balu
- Starring: Prabhu; Madhubala
- Cinematography: Ilavarasu
- Edited by: K. Pazhanivel
- Music by: Deva
- Production company: K. B. Films
- Release date: 10 November 1996
- Country: India
- Language: Tamil

Panchalankurichi is a 1996 Indian Tamil language drama film directed by Seeman in his directorial debut. The film stars Prabhu and Madhubala, with Chandrasekar, Vadivelu, Vijayakumar, Ilavarasi and Maheswari in supporting roles. It was released on 10 November 1996.

== Plot ==
Kitaan, as a young child, migrates to Panchalankurichi with his mother. When they try to cross a river his mother sacrifices herself to let him live. When he is distraught at the sight of his mother dying, Maayandi Thevar, the local chieftain, arrives and takes pity on Kitaan and takes him under his wing and raises him like a son.

Kitaan grows up in Panchalankurichi as a brave young man who is so noble in his acts that the local parents send their unmarried girls to the fairs of other villages with Kitaan as their guardian angel. Kitaan also has a brotherly relationship with Maayandi Thevar's daughter Chinnaatha. At a fair when a few local hooligans, brothers of Kaarisaamy misbehave with girls from Kitaan's village Kitaan fights with the goons to save their honour.

The heroine Pottu Kanni, upon seeing Kitaan's exploits in the fight and further in the local panchayat's inquest into the fight gets impressed with Kitaan and his qualities. Heroine is the daughter of Geedhari, who is a close acquaintance of Maayandi Thevar in the village.

Kaarisaamy, another local big shot, has locked horns with Maayandi in the past and had incurred some financial losses due to the fact that Maayandi opposes Kaarisaami's nefarious and illegal activists. Kaarisami plots revenge and plans a long game to bring Maayandi and Kitaan down. How Kitaan foils the Kaarisaamy's plan forms the rest of the story

One of Kaarisaamy's brothers Malasaamy is a classmate of Maayandi's daughtet Chinaatha. They fight initially but fall in love. Kaarisaamy plans to use this against Maayandi.

== Cast ==
- Prabhu as Kittan
- Madhoo as Pottu Kanni
- Vadivelu
- Vijayakumar as Mayandi
- Chandrasekhar as Geedhari
- Mahanadi Shankar as Kaarisaamy
- Ilavarasi
- Maheswari
- King Kong
- Prasanna

== Soundtrack ==
The soundtrack was composed by Deva.

Song	Singer	Lyrics	Duration
"Ana Aavanna"	Krishnaraj, Sujatha	Vairamuthu	4:55
"Aathoram Thopukulae"	Swarnalatha	Vairamuthu	6:13
"Chinna Chinna"	K. S. Chithra	Vairamuthu	5:08
"Chinnavale"	S. Janaki, Krishnaraj, Bhuvana Venkatesh	Vairamuthu	5:41
"Katrai Niruthi"	K. S. Chithra	Vairamuthu	2:37
"Oru Pakkam Then"	Krishnaraj, Bhuvana Venkatesh	Vairamuthu	2:23
"Un Uthattora"	Hariharan, Anuradha Sriram	Vairamuthu	6:00
"Vanthiyala"	Suresh Peters, Anuradha Sriram	Seeman	5:15

== Legacy ==
The phrase "Sonamutha Pocha" which was used by Vadivelu in one of the comedy sequences in the film became a popular meme material in social media and it has been predominantly used as a classic meme template to refer to the circumstances among how a group of friends could mock a person who has just faced temporary agony and temporary setbacks in a hilarious manner.
