= T. C. Vijayan =

Indian politician

T. C. Vijayan is an Indian politician and was a Member of the Legislative Assembly (MLA). He was elected to the Tamil Nadu legislative assembly as a Dravida Munnetra Kazhagam (DMK) candidate from the Thiruvottiyur constituency in the 1996 election.

No longer an MLA by October 2001, following the elections of earlier that year, Vijayan stood as a candidate for the office of chairman of Thiruvottiyur Municipality.
