= Thambi (2006 film) =

2006 film directed by Seeman

- Poster
- Directed by: Seeman
- Written by: Seeman
- Produced by: Murali Manohar
- Starring: Madhavan; Pooja
- Cinematography: Balasubramaniem
- Edited by: N. Ganesh Kumar
- Music by: Vidyasagar
- Production company: Motion Picture Partners
- Release date: 22 February 2006
- Running time: 138 minutes
- Country: India
- Language: Tamil

Thambi (transl. Younger Brother) is a 2006 Indian Tamil-language vigilante action drama film written and directed by Seeman. The film stars Madhavan and Pooja, while Vadivelu, Manivannan and Biju Menon play other supporting roles. Featuring music composed by Vidyasagar and cinematography by Balasubramaniem, the film was released on 22 February 2006 and became successful at the box office.

== Plot ==
Thambi Velu Thondaiman is a rebellious youth who cannot tolerate violence and injustice by any means. His main target is Sankara Pandian, a rich local goon. Thambi wants Sankara Pandian to leave all his illegal activities and violence. One day Thambi interrupts Archana's stage performance when chasing a wrongdoer. Archana misunderstands Thambi as a rowdy and hates him, but Thambi saves Archana in a restaurant when a few guys try molesting her, following which she starts liking him, which gradually transforms into love. However, Thambi does not reciprocate and wants Archana to stop following him as he has so many enemies in the city.

Thambi is invited to his alma mater to preside for a function where he opens up his personal story. A flashback is shown where Thambi was leading a joyful life with his parents and sister. Once, Thambi spots a murder committed by Saravana Pandian, Sankara Pandian's brother. Thambi becomes the murder witness and identifies the murderer in court, which angers Sankara Pandian. To avenge his brother's arrest, Sankara Pandian murders Thambi's parents and sister. This made Thambi transform into a fearless youth trying to make the city free from violence.

Thambi wants Sankara Pandian to transform into a good guy and prevents all his plans to erupt violence in the city. Finally, Sankara Pandian brings in violence and clashes in the city one day for political reasons. Unfortunately, his mother suddenly suffers a from heart attack, and he rushes to the hospital with her. On the way, however, his car gets blocked in traffic as there is violence everywhere on the roads, and he could not reach the hospital on time. Thambi comes to the spot, and Sankara Pandian thinks that Thambi will take revenge on him by killing his family. However, to his surprise, Thambi lifts Sankara Pandian's mother from the car and runs to the hospital. Sankara Pandian's mother is saved, following which Sankara Pandian realises his mistake and admires Thambi's great affection for the well-being of every person although not related to him. He also decides to leave all his violence and illegal activities and apologises to Thambi for his wrongful acts committed. In the end, Thambi and Archana unite.

== Cast ==
- Madhavan as Thambi Velu Thondaiman aka Thambi
- Pooja as Archana
- Vadivelu as Natarasu
- Biju Menon as Sankara Pandiyan
- Manivannan as Podhuvudamai
- Vagai Chandrasekhar
- Shanmugarajan as Saravana Pandiyan
- Ilavarasu as Sankaraiyan
- Raj Kapoor as Police
- Manobala as Sankaraiyan's assistant
- Vinod Raj
- Ragasudha
- Sumithra
- Karate Raja
- Sashikumar Subramani
- Thillai Rajan

== Production ==
Seeman made a comeback to film direction after taking a sabbatical following the release of Veeranadai and began working on a script about a village-based vigilante to be produced by Mid Valley Entertainments. Madhavan heard the script of the film at the insistence of his manager, Nazir, and was impressed with the "fire and confidence" in Seeman's narration. He subsequently signed on to work on the film in October 2004. The actor subsequently underwent a makeover for the film, sporting long hair and portrayed a young man from a village for the first time in his career. The team initially approached Asin for the lead female role, before finalising debutant Simran from Bombay. However, the team wanted to go for an actress with lesser remuneration and Pooja was eventually signed on to work on the film during December 2004 and collaborated with Madhavan for the second time after Jay Jay (2003). Madhavan's hairstyle from Priyasakthi (2005) was retained for this film too. The film was shot across South Tamil Nadu, with shoots extensively filmed in Karaikudi. Madhavan left the shoot of the film in August 2005 to attend the birth of his child in Mumbai. His sudden disappearance led to the Producers' Guild giving him a ban, before the matter was amicably sorted. The film was completed during November 2005 and the team began post-production works thereafter. Dubbing works were completed at Bharani Studios in Chennai later that month.

== Soundtrack ==
Soundtrack was composed by Vidyasagar.

Song title	Singers	Lyrics
"Kanavaa Endru"	Madhushree	Na. Muthukumar
"Enn Kadhal"	Saindhavi	Na. Muthukumar
"Poovanathil Maram" (duet)	Swarnalatha, P. Jayachandran	Na. Muthukumar
"Poovanathil Maram" (female)	Swarnalatha	Na. Muthukumar
"Ennamma Devi Jakkamma"	Karthik, Manikka Vinayagam, Balesh	Na. Muthukumar
"Sudum Nilavu"	P. Unnikrishnan, Harini	Vairamuthu
"Summa Kidantha"	Karthik, Kalyani Nair	Vairamuthu
"Olai Kudisai"	Karthik, Sujatha	Vairamuthu
"Udambinai Urudhi Sei"	Vidyasagar	Bharathiyar

== Release and reception ==
The film opened to positive reviews and performed well at the box office. A critic from Sify stated "Seeman's intentions are noble but could have been told in a more realistic manner". Lajjavathi of Kalki wrote the ideas of the revolutionaries sprinkled throughout the film and the way the director has handled it make the film very different, not only Tamil cinema but also the society needs films like Thambi. Cinesouth wrote "Instead of giving an action film, director Seeman has given oxygen and thus we feel like treating him with great affection". Seeman won the Tamil Nadu State Film Award for Best Dialogue Writer.
