= Iniyavale =

- Poster
- Directed by: Seeman
- Written by: Seeman
- Produced by: M. Vedha
- Starring: Prabhu; Gautami; Suvalakshmi; Keerthi Reddy
- Cinematography: Ilavarasu
- Edited by: K. Pazhanivel
- Music by: Deva
- Production company: M. V. M. Pictures
- Release date: 15 May 1998
- Running time: 150 minutes
- Country: India
- Language: Tamil

Iniyavale is a 1998 Indian Tamil-language drama film written and directed by Seeman. The film stars Prabhu, Gautami, Suvalakshmi and Keerthi Reddy. It was released on 15 May 1998.

== Plot ==
Prabhakaran, a poet, lives with his mother and his father. Prabhakaran has two friends Raja and Murugan who are like his brothers. A classical dancer admires his poems. His ambition is passing the IAS exams and becoming a collector at all costs before the marriage. Prabhakaran's father and Ramanathan are close friends and they decide to get Prabhakaran and Ramanathan's daughter Meena married. Meena is a very sensitive girl. Prabhakaran cannot accept and tries to cancel the marriage whereas Meena falls in love with her future groom Prabhakaran. Prabhakaran refuses for the marriage as a consequence Meena commits suicide because of a misinterpretation. Meena's family blames the innocent Prabhakaran. He feels guilty and decides to marry Meena's younger sister Manju, a playful girl. What transpires later forms the crux of the story.

== Cast ==
- Prabhu as Prabhakaran
- Gautami as Dancer
- Suvalakshmi as Meena
- Keerthi Reddy as Manju
- Raghuvaran as Ramanathan
- T. S. B. K. Moulee as Prabhakaran's father
- Vadivelu as Murugan
- Raja as Raja
- Lakshmi as Lakshmi, Prabhakaran's mother
- Kalaranjini as Ramanathan's wife
- Devan as Meena and Manju's uncle
- Jai Ganesh as Shanmugam
- Mohan V. Ram
- Venu Arvind as Latha's husband
- Premi as Raja's mother
- Lavanya as Latha (Raja's sister)
- Halwa Vasu as Perumal
- Hemalatha as Rani

== Production ==
Malayalam actress Manju Warrier was initially attached to the project but later opted out. Kausalya was expected to replace her, though later Suvaluxmi was cast. The cancellation of Prabhu's other film Nanba Nanba meant that he was able to clear his schedule to shoot for Iniyavale during March 1998.

== Soundtrack ==
The soundtrack was composed by Deva. The film marks lyricist Thamarai's debut in Tamil cinema.

Song	Singer(s)	Lyrics	Duration
"Annakili Vannakili"	Krishnaraj	Punniyar	4:59
"Kanneerukku Kasu"	Krishnaraj	Seeman	5:29
"Malaroadu Piranthavala"	Hariharan, Anuradha Sriram	Seeman	5:27
"Manja Manjala"	P. Unni Krishnan	Jeevan	4:31
"Thendral"	Anuradha Sriram	Thamarai	6:08
"Uyire Uyire"	Hariharan, Swarnalatha	Arivumathi	5:03

== Reception ==
D. S. Ramanujam of The Hindu wrote, "It is a fusion of poetic narration and human drama in which director Seeman succeeds fairly well".
