= Tiruvottiyur railway station =

Railway station in Chennai, India

Tiruvottiyur
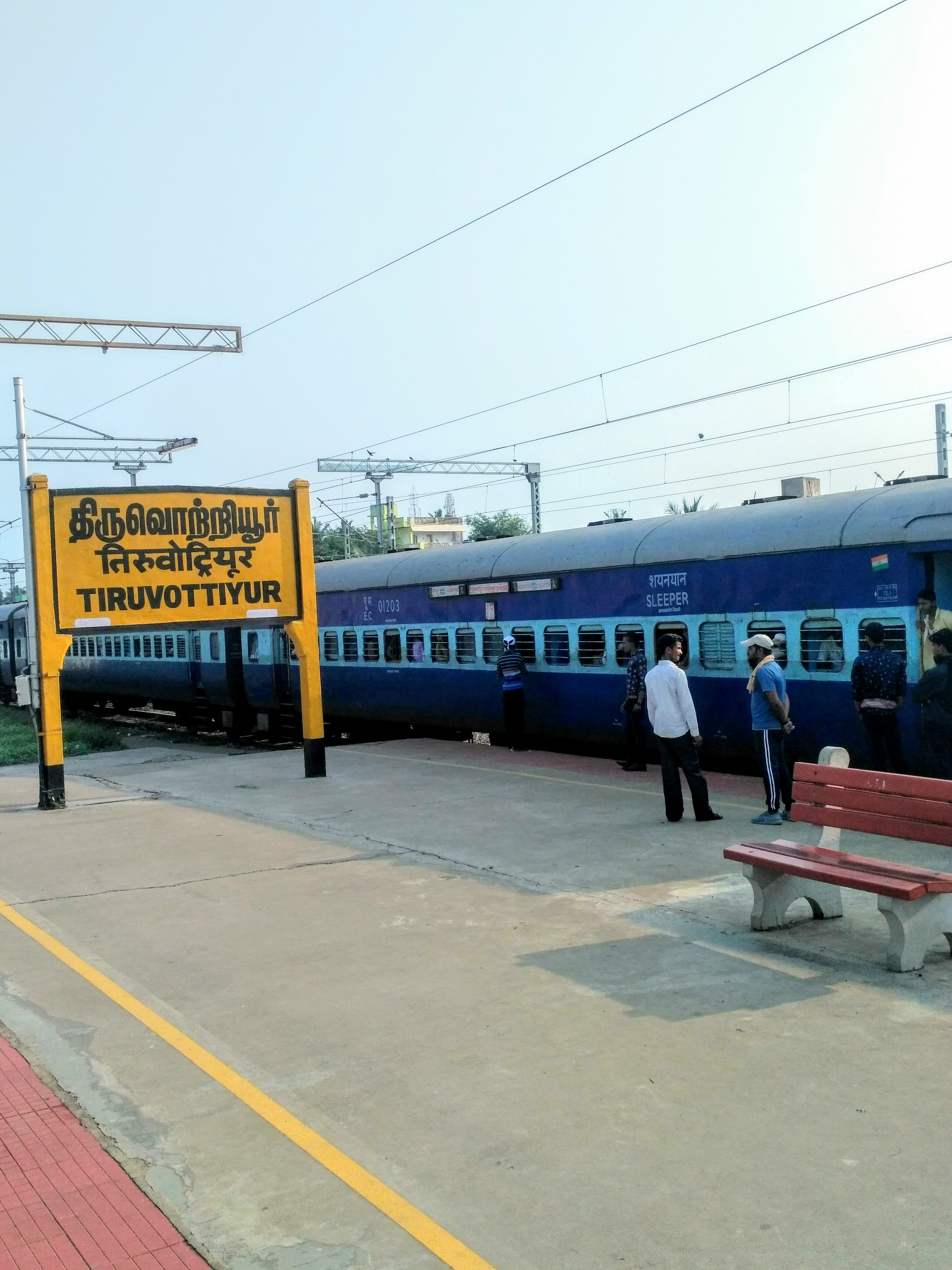

General information
- Location: Tiruvottiyur, Chennai, Tamil Nadu, India
- Coordinates: 13°9′33″N 80°17′46″E
- System: Indian Railways and Chennai Suburban Railway station
- Owner: Ministry of Railways, Indian Railways
- Line: North line of Chennai Suburban Railway
- Platforms: 3
- Tracks: 5

Construction
- Structure type: Standard on-ground station
- Parking: Available
- Cycle facilities: available

Other information
- Status: Active
- Station code: TVT
- Fare zone: Southern Railways

History
- Electrified: 13 April 1979
- Former names: South Indian Railway

Passengers
- 2013: 25,000
Location
- Location within India Location within Tamil Nadu

Tiruvottiyur railway station is one of the railway station of the Chennai Central–Gummidipoondi section of the Chennai Suburban Railway Network. It serves the neighbourhood of Tiruvottiyur, a suburb of Chennai, and is located 9 km north of Chennai Central railway station. It has an elevation of 7 m above sea level.

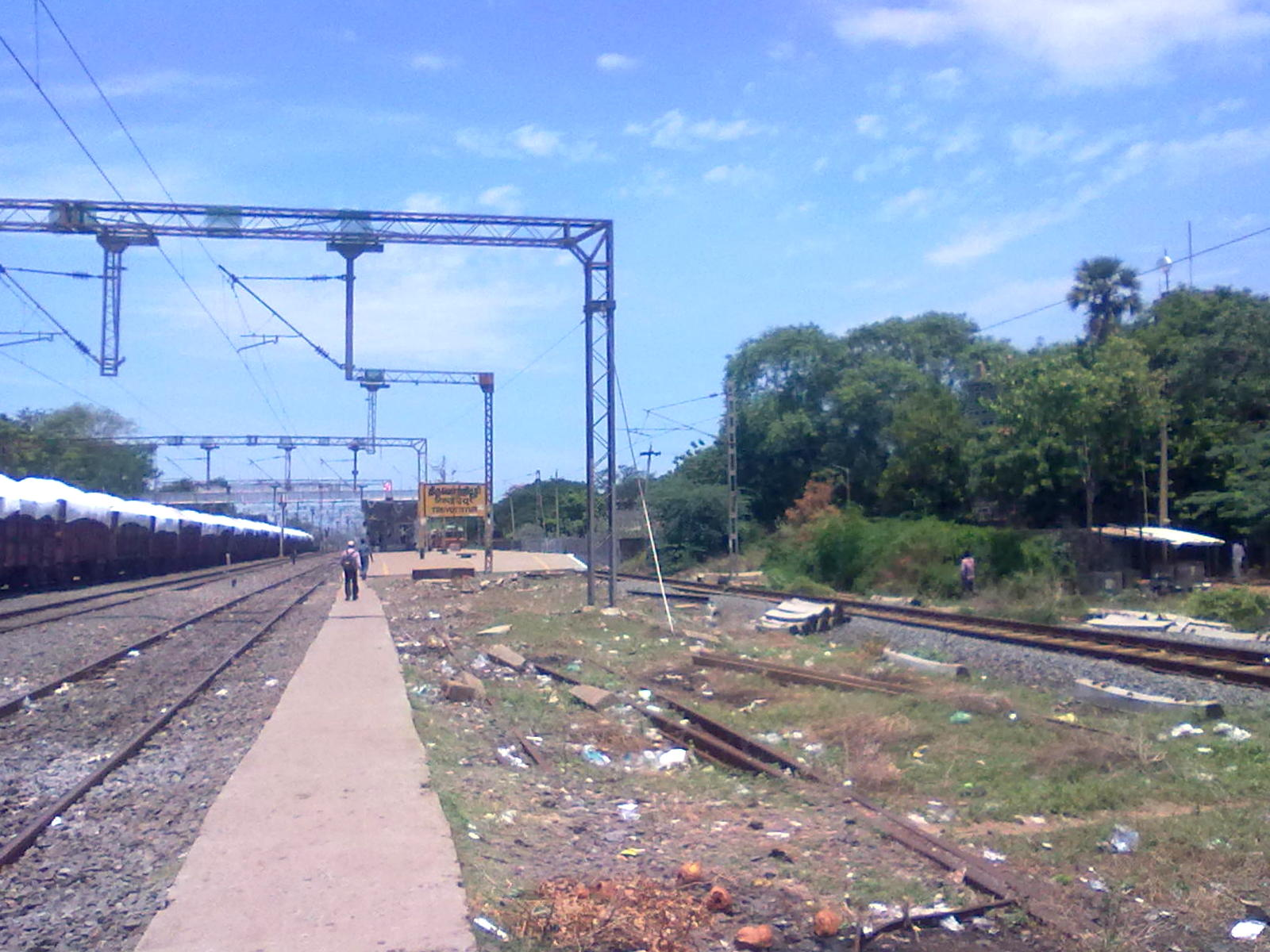
Tiruvotiyur Railway station

Board displaying name of the station

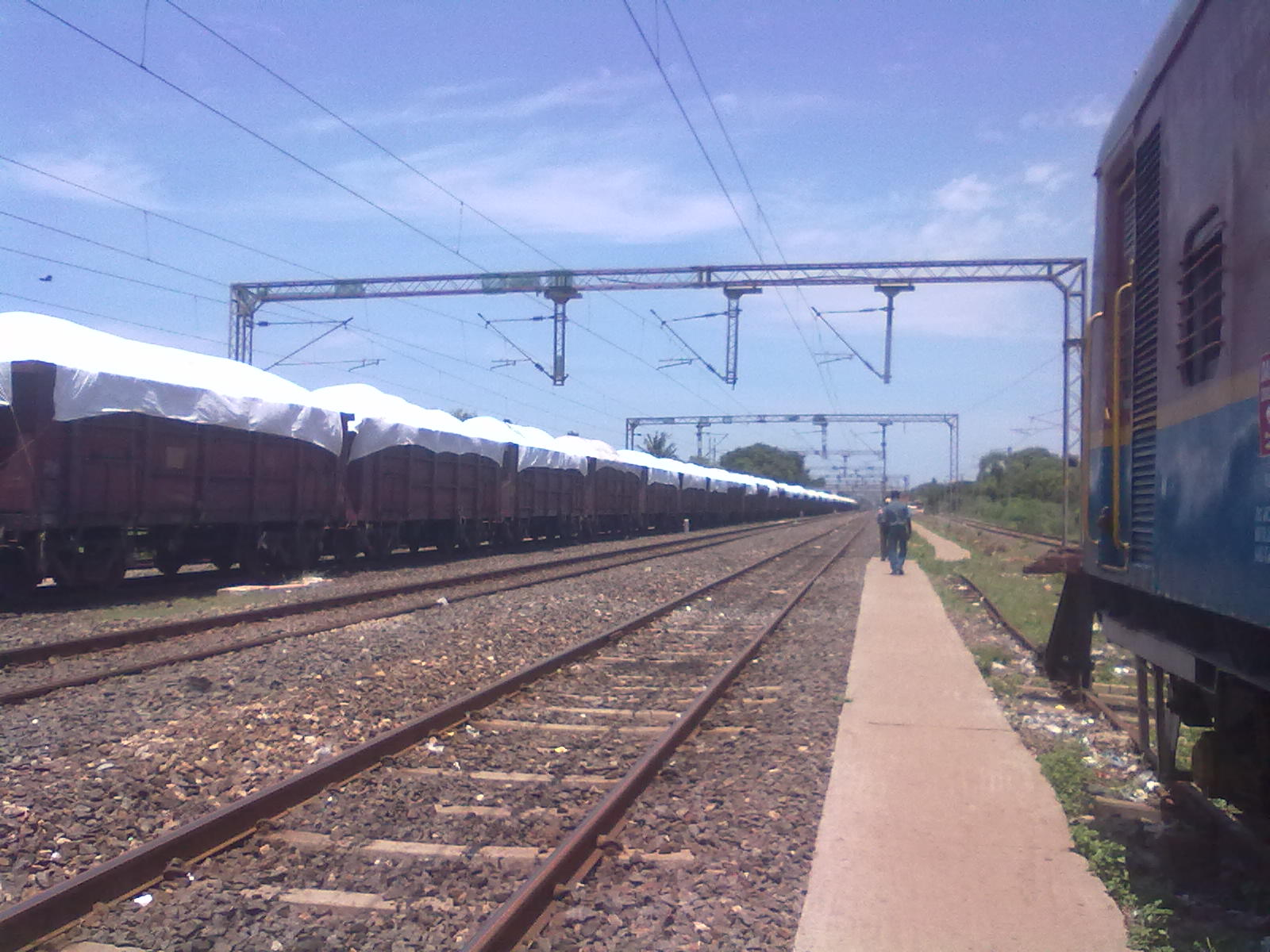
Tracks towards TVT railway station From distance

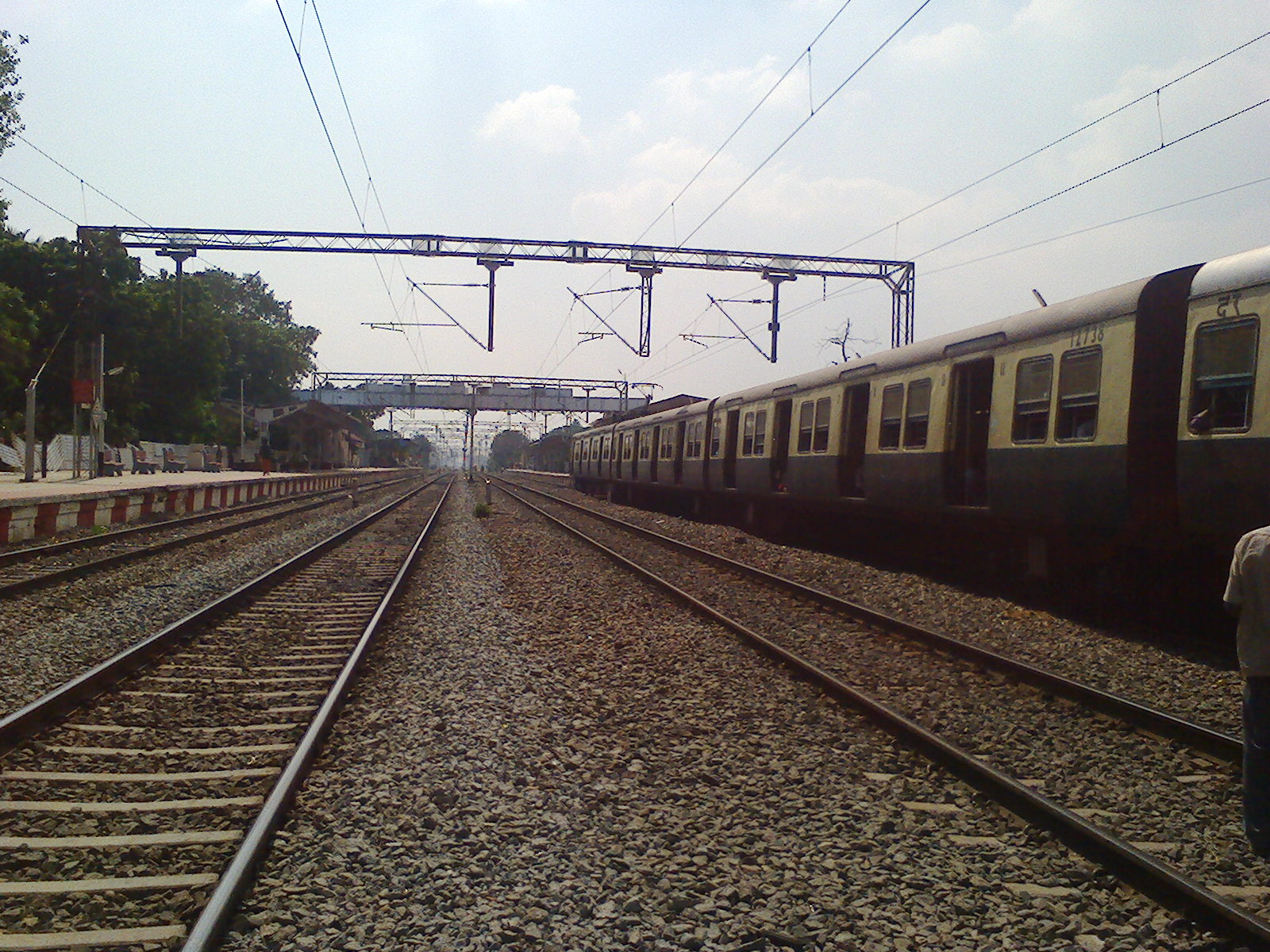
TVT station, A view from Railway tracks

== History ==
The lines at the station were electrified on 13 April 1979, with the electrification of the Chennai Central–Gummidipoondi section.

== Services ==
Daily regular EMU services are available up to Gummidipoondi, Sullurpeta, Ennore in the north and Chennai central in the south. In addition, rare daily rails are available up to Chennai beach, Tiruvallur, Velachery, Tambaram and Chengalpattu.

== Traffic ==
Approximately 25,000 people use the station every day.

== See also ==
- Chennai Suburban Railway
- Railway stations in Chennai
- Tiruvottiyur
