= K. P. P. Samy =

Indian politician (1962–2020)

K. P. P. Samy (1 July 1962 – 27 February 2020) was an Indian politician who served as Minister for Fisheries in Tamil Nadu state of India and as a member of the Tamil Nadu Legislative Assembly from the Thiruvottiyur (state assembly constituency). He was a Member of Tamil Nadu State Legislative Assembly as a Dravida Munnetra Kazhagam DMK candidate from fishermen-dominated Thiruvottiyur (state assembly constituency) in 2016 election. He was also elected as MLA of Tiruvottiyur in 2006 election. He served as Minister for Fisheries including Fisheries Development and Fisheries Corporation at Thirteenth Tamil Nadu Legislative Assembly under the former Chief Minister of Tamil Nadu M. Karunanidhi in the Tamil Nadu state of India. He was Dravida Munnetra Kazhagam state Fisheries wing Secretary. He was born in Chennai on 1 July 1962. He died due to illness on 27 February 2020 at the age of 57.

He finished his school education. His brothers Tiruvotriyur K P Shankar and K P Chokalingam are a Dravida Munnetra Kazhagam cadre of Tiruvottiyur.

His brother Tiruvotriyur K P Shankar was also a Councillor of the Greater Chennai Corporation ward No.5 at Tiruvottiyur Zone and represents the Dravida Munnetra Kazhagam. He was elected as Member of Tamil Nadu from the Tiruvotriyur Assembly in 2021 Election.
