= Society of International Nature and Wildlife Photographers =

Professional photographic organization

The Society of International Nature and Wildlife Photographers
- Type: Trade association, Professional association
- Key people: Colin Jones (CEO); Phil Jones (Director); Juliet Jones (Director)
- Website: The Society of International Nature and Wildlife Photographers

The Society of International Nature and Wildlife Photographers (SINWP) is a professional photographic organization formed in October 2008.

The association encourages development and discussion relating to photography and promotes the interests of photographers via seminars, workshops, roadshows and industry recognised qualifications. The group provides lists of recognised and qualified professional photographers throughout the world, all of them meeting strict standards of conduct as laid down in the group's rules.

== Membership ==
There are no restrictions on membership, which is international and includes amateur and professional nature and wildlife photographers.

== Photographic Competitions ==
The Society of International Nature and Wildlife Photographers has run a number of photographic competitions specifically for nature and wildlife photographers these include:

- SINWP Bird Photographer of the Year 2022
- SINWP 2018 Bird Photographer of the Year
- Great Outdoors
- Nature in Action
- Close-up
- In the Wild
- Living Planet
- Celebrating Nature
- Spectacular landscape
