= Seeman =

Indian film director, actor and politician (b. 1966)

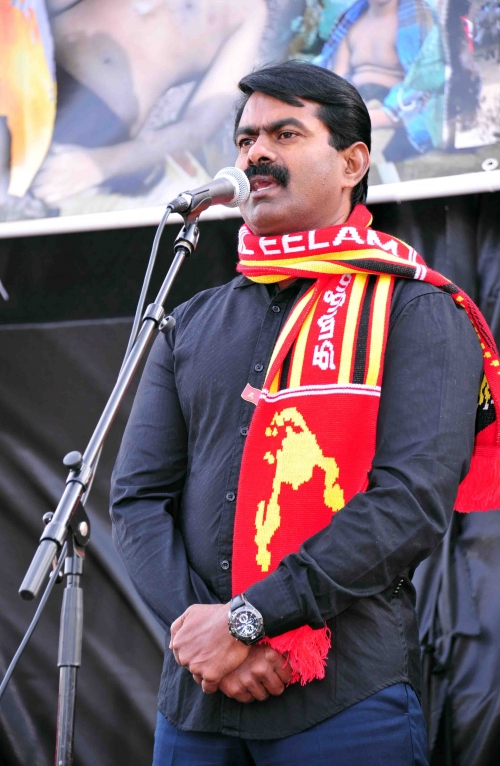

Chief-coordinator of Naam Tamilar Katchi
- Incumbent
- Assumed office 18 May 2010
- Preceded by: Position established

Personal details
- Born: Senthamizhan Seeman; 8 November 1966 (age 59) Aranaiyur, Madras State, India
- Party: Naam Tamilar Katchi (since 2010)
- Other political affiliations: Naam Tamilar Iyakkam (2009–2010); Dravidar Kazhagam (2006–2009)
- Spouse: Kayalvizhi (m. 2013)
- Children: 2
- Occupation: Film director; Actor; Politician
- Awards: Kalaimamani Award (2006)
- Website: www.naamtamilar.org

Senthamizhan Seeman (/siːmɑːn/) (born 8 November 1966) is an Indian politician, actor and former filmmaker. He is the leader and chief-coordinator of the Naam Tamilar Katchi political party in Tamil Nadu. He is a strong advocate for regional autonomy and Tamil nationalism.

Seeman began his career as a filmmaker in the mid-1990s, working on films such as Panchalankurichi (1996) and Veeranadai (2000). The failure of his early films made it difficult for him to attract offers as a director and several of his proposed projects were stalled in the late 1990s. He later made a comeback through the successful vigilante film Thambi (2006), though the commercial failure of his next film, prompted Seeman to prioritise commitments as a supporting actor in the late 2000s.

In the early 2010s, Seeman founded the Naam Tamilar Katchi, a Tamil ultranationalist political party, and has since often been in the news for his controversial statements on Indian and Tamil social issues.

== Early life ==
Seeman was born in Aranaiyur, Sivaganga, a village in Tamil Nadu, to father Senthamizhan, a member of the Indian National Congress, and mother Annammal. He studied in Government Primary School in Aranayur up to class 5th. He attended K.K. Ibrahim Ali High School from Class 6th to Class 10th and finished his class 11 and 12 in Ilayankudi. He completed his degree undergraduate economics at Dr. Zakir Hussain College in Ilayankudi. Seeman has a brother named James Peter. During his high school and college years, Seeman was enthralled with the ideals of the Dravidian movement. He moved to Chennai to pursue his dream of working in the film industry.

== Film career ==
Seeman took up film direction as a career after being inspired by the films of Bharathiraja and Manivannan. He worked as an assistant director with Bharathiraja and Manivannan. Seeman started his career by directing Panchalankurichi (1996), a village action film starring Prabhu and Madhubala. He collaborated with Prabhu again in Iniyavale (1998), a romantic film which also featured actresses Suvalakshmi, Gouthami and Keerthi Reddy. Seeman's third film was Veeranadai (2000) with Sathyaraj and Khushbu, which garnered mixed review from critics and underperformed commercially. The failure of his initial films made it difficult for Seeman to attract producers to work on his next films. During the late 1990s and early 2000s, he worked on four other projects, Vaigai Karai Oram with Vijayakanth, Anandham with Karthik, Karma Veerar with Sarathkumar, and Sethupathi Cheemaiyile with Rajkiran, but all failed to develop beyond production.

Seeman then made the village-based vigilante film, Thambi (2006), starring Madhavan in the titular role. The film's production was briefly halted following a disagreement between the actor and director, after Seeman raised an objection to Madhavan returning to be with his family for the birth of his son. The film opened to mixed reviews but performed well commercially. His most recent directorial release, Vaazhthugal (2008), received negative reviews and performed poorly at the box office. A reviewer from Sify noted the "execution is tacky and the final outcome is a dreary and boring message film that leaves you exhausted."

The failure of Vaazhthugal made it difficult for Seeman to find producers and actors to work on his other proposed projects, despite his interest in continuing work as a film director. In the late 2000s, Seeman attempted to make a film titled Pagalavan with either Ajith Kumar or Madhavan starring, but was unsuccessful. Seeman then hoped to make the film with Vikram for director Bala's production studio, but the venture did not materialise. In mid-2010, producer Kalaipuli S. Dhanu agreed to finance the project, and Seeman held talks with Vijay to be a part of the film. The actor later refused to work on the project, which prompted Seeman to speak out against Vijay. In 2013, Seeman approached Jiiva, Jayam Ravi, Arya and Vishal to work on the project, but none of the actors agreed to be a part of the film. In 2017, Seeman was in talks with Vijay Antony to feature in the lead role, and then with Silambarasan in 2018, but both actors later opted to prioritise other projects. In 2017, Seeman announced another project titled Kobam with G. V. Prakash Kumar in the lead role. However, despite an announcement, the film failed to find producers and was stalled.

Since the mid-2000s, Seeman has mostly worked as an actor. His notable roles including supporting characters in Pallikoodam (2007) and Evano Oruvan (2007).

== Awards ==
- Kalaimamani Award - 2006

== Politics and activism ==
=== Early political life and Naam Tamilar Katchi ===
Seeman addressed Periyar's ideology and caste abolition in the film industry. In the 2006 assembly elections, he campaigned for the DMK alliance, and notably sided with Pattali Makkal Katchi's S. Ramadoss and delivered speeches against the candidature of Vijayakanth. He met with LTTE leader Velupillai Prabhakaran in 2008 when the Sri Lankan Civil War between the Sri Lankan government and the LTTE was looming. Following this, Seeman began to speak out against the killings of several Tamils during Sri Lanka's civil war. Seeman's ensuing speech in Rameswaram marked a turning point in his political career for which he was arrested. He was also detained for continuing to speak out in Erode in favour of the LTTE. He was subjected to the National Security Act, passport block and state monitoring.

Seeman was arrested in March 2009 under the National Security act for speaking in favour of the LTTE and was lodged at the Kalapet prison.

Seeman along with several other activists gathered on 18 May 2009, coinciding the end of the Sri Lankan Civil War at Madurai to form the Naam Tamilar Iyakkam, as a social outfit. It subsequently transformed into a political party named Naam Tamilar Katchi (NTK).

Seeman was arrested at Chepauk under the National Security Act for making inflammatory speeches at a meeting protesting against the killing of a Tamil fisherman by the Sri Lankan Navy. He was detained at the Vellore Central Prison for five months.

=== Political activism (2011–2019) ===
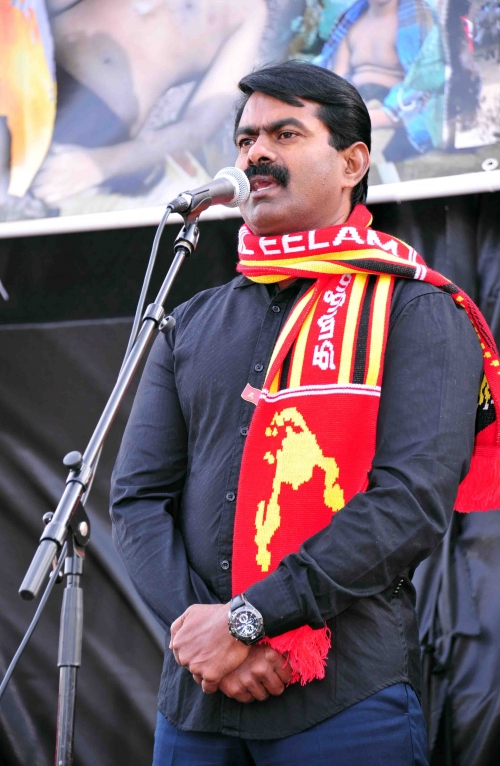
Seeman Speech Outside UN headquarters Geneva

Upon his release from a five-month detention at the Vellore prison in 2011, Seeman actively campaigned for the defeat of the Indian National Congress in the 2011 Legislative Assembly elections. He was neutral on the MDMK and DMK and supportive of the AIADMK. Seeman campaigned in 59 of the 63 places the INC contested in, and the party was defeated in all of those constituencies except one.

Since the 2011 assembly elections, Seeman and his party have been actively involved in various causes such as the anti-nuclear Power plant protests in Kudankulam or the attacks on Tamil fishermen perpetuated by the Sri Lankan Navy that claimed the lives of over 800 fishermen.

During the parliamentary elections in 2014, Seeman stated that the NTK would campaign for the defeat of all candidates fielded by the INC, BJP and DMDK and would support the AIADMK.

In February 2015, the party conceived Veera Thamizhar Munnani, aimed at reviving and recovering age-old Tamil culture and traditions. In September 2016, Seeman was among some 176 people arrested after "attempting to lay siege to Srivaikuntam dam, where desilting works [were] under way as per a directive from the National Green Tribunal".

=== 2016 Tamil Nadu assembly elections ===
The NTK contested in the 2016 assembly election, with Seeman as the Chief Ministerial candidate from the Cuddalore constituency. The party contested in all the 234 assembly constituencies on its own, in the elections Tamil Nadu and as well as those in Puducherry. Seeman contested in the 2016 Tamil Nadu Legislative Assembly election from Cuddalore constituency and polled 12,497 votes and lost by a low margin, finishing fifth and forfeiting his deposits in the process. The party failed to win a single seat.

=== 2021 Tamil Nadu assembly elections ===
During the 2021 Tamil Nadu Legislative Assembly elections, Seeman contested from the Thiruvottiyur constituency and lost.

== Electoral performance ==
Elections	Constituency	Party	Result	Votes	Vote %
2016	Cuddalore	NTK	Lost	12,497	7.24%
2021	Thiruvottiyur	NTK	Lost	48,597	24.43%
2026	Karaikudi	NTK	Lost	30,793	13.43%
2026 By-polls	Ambasamudram	NTK	TBD		

2026 Tamil Nadu Legislative Assembly Bye-election: Ambasamudram
Party	Candidate	Votes	%	±%
NTK				
TVK				
DMK				
AIADMK				
Other parties	Other party candidates			
Independent	Independent candidates			
NOTA	None of the above			
Margin of victory				
Turnout				
Registered electors				
gain from		Swing		

2026 Tamil Nadu Legislative Assembly election: Karaikudi
Party	Candidate	Votes	%	±%
TVK	T. K. Prabhu	101,358	44.21	New
INC	Mangudi S	55,284	24.11	▼11.64
AMMK	Dherpoki V. Pandi	33,352	14.55	▼6.57
NTK	Seeman	30,793	13.46	▲2.15
Independent	Independent candidates	5,200	2.27	New
Others	Other party candidates	2,761	1.2	New
NOTA	None of the above	519	0.23	▼0.40
Margin of victory		46,074	20.10	▲9.94
Turnout		2,29,267	74.89	▲7.88
Registered electors		3,06,124		▼10,917
TVK gain from INC		Swing	▲44.21	

2021 Tamil Nadu Legislative Assembly election : Thiruvottiyur
Party	Candidate	Votes	%	±%
DMK	K. P. Shankar	88,185	44.34%	▲1.09
AIADMK	K. Kuppan	50,524	25.40%	▼15.29
NTK	Seeman	48,597	24.43%	▲22.35
MNM	D. Mohan	7,053	3.55%	New
AMMK	M. Soundara Pandian	1,417	0.71%	New
NOTA	None of the above	1,111	0.56%	▼0.97
Margin of victory		37,661	18.94%	▲16.38
Turnout		200,077	65.38%	▼1.56
Total valid votes		198,885		
Rejected ballots		81	0.04%	▲0.01
Registered electors		306,005		▲7.74
DMK hold		Swing	▲1.09	

2016 Tamil Nadu Legislative Assembly election: Cuddalore
Party	Candidate	Votes	%	±%
AIADMK	M. C. Sampath	70,922	41.07	−19.49
DMK	Ela. Pugazhendi	46,509	26.93%	−9.9
TMC(M)	A. S. Chandarasekaran	20,608	11.93%	New
PMK	Pazha. Thamaraikannan	16,905	9.79%	New
NTK	Seeman	12,497	7.24%	New
NOTA	NOTA	2,062	1.19%	New
BJP	P. Selvam	1,964	1.14%	+0.02
Margin of victory		24,413	14.14%	−9.59%
Turnout		172,688	74.69%	−3.33%
Registered electors		231,205		
AIADMK hold		Swing	-19.49%	

== Personal life ==
Seeman is married to Kayalvizhi, daughter of K. Kalimuthu, former Speaker of Tamil Nadu Legislative Assembly from the AIADMK party. The ceremony was held according to Tamil traditions at the YMCA grounds in Nandanam, Chennai in September 2013.

Actress Vijayalakshmi claimed that she was in a relationship with Seeman who she had met on the sets of Seeman's film Vaazhthugal during 2007. In 2011, she filed a police complaint against him for cheating on her after promising to marry her. The pair continued to engage in a public war of words throughout the 2010s, with Vijayalakshmi later attempting suicide in July 2020, blaming Seeman and his supporters of torture. In 2011, Seeman publicly expressed his interest in marrying a Sri Lankan Tamil woman and chose Yarlmathy, a widow of an LTTE fighter, but later did not do so.

== Controversies ==
Seeman has received several threat letters for his support of the Liberation Tigers of Tamil Eelam (LTTE) and other controversial remarks on Indian social issues.

One of the most controversial aspects of Seeman and his political party is that of ethnic purism arbitrarily based on caste lines. He claims the "decline of Tamil people" is due to continuous rule of Tamil Nadu by 'Vandheris' (refers to outsiders or non-Tamils, especially Telugus based on caste and history of immigration) and that the only hope for Tamils is to elect a "real Tamilian" to power.

In November 2009, while on a speaking tour in Canada, Seeman was arrested by the Canada Border Services Agency for giving a hate-filled incendiary speech at an event in Toronto. In the speech, he reportedly talked about restarting the civil war in Sri Lanka, and allegedly said "no Sinhala can live," if the LTTE had taken the same path and bombed 100 Sinhala schools for every Tamil school which was attacked.

In 2013, Seeman invited Kashmiri separatist leader Yasin Malik for one of his public meetings, which drew significant criticism from both the INC and BJP.

While campaigning for the Vikravandi assembly by-election in 2019, Seeman purportedly justified the assassination of former Indian Prime Minister Rajiv Gandhi, for Gandhi had sent the Indian Peace Keeping Force (IPKF) to Sri Lanka, which would then go on to kill of numerous Tamil civilians. The speech raised criticism from people from all across the political spectrum. Following this event, many charges were booked against Seeman by the police.

In October 2019, Seeman was put under investigation by the Malaysian police over alleged involvement with the LTTE.

Although Seeman openly claims to be a supporter of Tamil Eelam and LTTE, the sincerity behind his proclaimed stance has been questioned multiple times. In a leaked audio, he was caught using profanity against late LTTE fighter Pottu Amman.

In February 2023, during the Erode East Assembly constituency by-election campaign, when talking about the Vijaynagar kings capturing Tamil Nadu, he had mentioned "they brought members of the Arunthathiyar community to this region to do scavenging". He received backlash and his comments also sparked protests by Arunthathiyar outfits. The Election Commission also issued a notice to the NTK seeking an explanation. Seeman was also booked by the Karungalpalayam police, registering a case under three sections. The police added more Indian Penal Code sections to the case due to his claims that "using an iron fist" will "get rid of the problem" of North Indians and Hindi speakers coming to Tamil Nadu for employment during the same speech. He later said that he was not specifically talking about North Indian migrant workers, but instead about M. K. Stalin's alleged falsification of the increase in crimes committed by people from north India living in Tamil Nadu.

While speaking at a demonstration to condemn the 2023–2025 Manipur violence on 30 July 2023, Seeman called Muslims and Christians as "Satan's children" by blaming them that they had consistently voted for DMK and Congress. Despite condemnation from multiple organisations and political parties representing minority communities, Seeman questioned whether Muslims and Christians would begin "voting for me if I apologize for my remarks." Political parties accused Seeman of venturing down a "dangerous path" by adopting the "BJP's language" in Tamil Nadu. The Tamil Nadu Platform for People's Unity (TNPPU) condemned his statements.
