= K. P. Shankar =

Indian politician

Member of Legislative Assembly
- In office 7 May 2021 – 4 May 2026
- Constituency: Thiruvottiyur

Personal details
- Party: Dravida Munnetra Kazhagam
- Spouse(s): S. Kasthuri; S. Sridevi
- Children: P. S. Dhileepan P. S. Aravindan S. Ishwarya S. Soundarya

Tiruvotriyur K. P. Shankar is a social worker, businessman, and Indian politician and a member of the Dravida Munnetra Kazhagam party. He was elected as a member of the Tamil Nadu Legislative Assembly from the Tiruvottiyur constituency in 2021. He served as a Councillor of the Greater Chennai Corporation ward No.5 at Tiruvottiyur Zone and represents the Dravida Munnetra Kazhagam. He is the brother of former DMK MLA K.P.P.Samy.

He was removed from the post of the party's Tiruvottiyur West area secretary after he had reportedly attacked a city corporation engineer who was overseeing road-laying work in his constituency.

== Electoral performance ==
2021 Tamil Nadu Legislative Assembly election: Thiruvottiyur
| Party | Candidate | Votes | % | ±% |
|---|---|---|---|---|
| DMK | K. P. Shankar | 88,185 | 44.34% | +1.09 |
| AIADMK | K. Kuppan | 50,524 | 25.40% | −15.29 |
| NTK | Seeman | 48,597 | 24.43% | +22.35 |
| MNM | D. Mohan | 7,053 | 3.55% | New |
| AMMK | M. Soundara Pandian | 1,417 | 0.71% | New |
| NOTA | NOTA | 1,111 | 0.56% | −0.98 |
| Margin of victory | | 37,661 | 18.94% | 16.38% |
| Turnout | | 198,885 | 64.99% | −1.93% |
| Rejected ballots | | 81 | 0.04% | |
| Registered electors | | 306,004 | | |
| DMK hold | | Swing | 1.09% | |

== Sources ==
- Election Commission of India
- K.P.Shankar(DMK):Constituency- THIRUVOTTIYUR(THIRUVALLUR) - Affidavit Information of Candidate:
- Thiruvottiyur Election Result 2021 LIVE: DMK's KP Shankar wins against AIADMK's K Kuppan
- Thiruvottiyur, Tamil Nadu Assembly election result 2021
