= K. Kuppan =

Indian politician

K. Kuppan is an Indian politician and was a member of the 14th Tamil Nadu Legislative Assembly from the Thiruvottiyur constituency. He represented the All India Anna Dravida Munnetra Kazhagam party.

The elections of 2016 resulted in his constituency being won by K. P. P. Samy.

In September 2016, Kuppan was put forward as an AIADMK candidate for the Chennai Corporation elections.
