= Thiruvottiyur Assembly constituency =

State Legislative Assembly Constituency in Tamil Nadu

Coordinates: 13.17°N 80.30°E

Thiruvottiyur
- Constituency No. 10 for the Tamil Nadu Legislative Assembly

Constituency details
- Country: India
- Region: South India
- State: Tamil Nadu
- District: Chennai
- Lok Sabha constituency: Chennai North
- Established: 1967
- Total electors: 244,903

Member of Legislative Assembly
- 17th Tamil Nadu Legislative Assembly
- Incumbent N. Senthil Kumar
- Party: TVK
- Elected year: 2026

Thiruvottiyur is a state assembly constituency in Thiruvallur district in Tamil Nadu. Its State Assembly Constituency number is 10. It consists of a portion of Tiruvottiyur taluk. It falls under Chennai North Lok Sabha constituency. It is one of the 234 State Legislative Assembly Constituencies in Tamil Nadu in India. Elections and winners in the constituency are listed below.

== Members of the Legislative Assembly ==
Election	Member	Party
1967	A. P. Arasu	Dravida Munnetra Kazhagam
1971	M. V. Narayanaswamy	Dravida Munnetra Kazhagam
1977	P. Sigamony	All India Anna Dravida Munnetra Kazhagam
1980	Kumari Ananthan	Gandhi Kamaraj National Congress
1982	U Thangasamy	All India Anna Dravida Munnetra Kazhagam
1984	G. K. J. Bharathi	Indian National Congress
1989	T. K. Palanisamy	Dravida Munnetra Kazhagam
1991	K. Kuppan	All India Anna Dravida Munnetra Kazhagam
1996	T. C. Vijayan	Dravida Munnetra Kazhagam
2001	T. Arumugam	All India Anna Dravida Munnetra Kazhagam
2006	K. P. P. Samy	Dravida Munnetra Kazhagam
2011	K. Kuppan	All India Anna Dravida Munnetra Kazhagam
2016	K. P. P. Samy	Dravida Munnetra Kazhagam
2021	K. P. Shankar	Dravida Munnetra Kazhagam
2026	N. Senthil Kumar	Tamilaga Vettri Kazhagam

Madras State

== Election results ==
Vote share of winning candidates
2026	53.15%
2021	44.34%
2016	43.25%
2011	57.03%
2006	46.34%
2001	54.94%
1996	64.19%
1991	56.54%
1989	45.58%
1984	54.26%
1980	47.36%
1977	31.29%
1971	53.74%
1967	61.23%

=== 2026 ===
2026 Tamil Nadu Legislative Assembly election : Thiruvottiyur
Party	Candidate	Votes	%	±%
TVK	N. Senthil Kumar	110,067	53.15%	New
CPI(M)	Sundararaj. L	56,503	27.28%	New
AIADMK	K. Kuppan	28,320	13.68%	New
NTK	Sathya. B	8,413	4.06%	▼20.37
NOTA	None of the above	805	0.39%	▼0.17
Margin of victory		53,564	25.87%	▲6.93
Turnout		207,167	84.58%	▲19.20
Total valid votes		207,088		
Registered electors		244,931		▼19.96
TVK gain from DMK		Swing	▲8.81	

=== 2021 ===
2021 Tamil Nadu Legislative Assembly election : Thiruvottiyur
Party	Candidate	Votes	%	±%
DMK	K. P. Shankar	88,185	44.34%	▲1.09
AIADMK	K. Kuppan	50,524	25.40%	▼15.29
NTK	Seeman	48,597	24.43%	▲22.35
MNM	D. Mohan	7,053	3.55%	New
AMMK	M. Soundara Pandian	1,417	0.71%	New
NOTA	None of the above	1,111	0.56%	▼0.97
Margin of victory		37,661	18.94%	▲16.38
Turnout		200,077	65.38%	▼1.56
Total valid votes		198,885		
Rejected ballots		81	0.04%	▲0.01
Registered electors		306,005		▲7.74
DMK hold		Swing	▲1.09	

=== 2016 ===
2016 Tamil Nadu Legislative Assembly election : Thiruvottiyur
Party	Candidate	Votes	%	±%
DMK	K. P. P. Samy	82,205	43.25%	▲2.78
AIADMK	B. Balraj	77,342	40.69%	▼16.34
DMDK	A. V. Arumugam	13,463	7.08%	New
PMK	R. Vasanthakumari	4,025	2.12%	New
NTK	R. Gokul	3,961	2.08%	New
BJP	M. Sivakumar	3,313	1.74%	▲0.70
NOTA	None of the above	2,917	1.53%	New
Margin of victory		4,863	2.56%	▼14.01
Turnout		190,116	66.94%	▲66.94
Total valid votes		190,061		
Rejected ballots		55	0.03%	
Registered electors		284,010		▲28.22
DMK gain from AIADMK		Swing	▼13.78	

=== 2011 ===
2011 Tamil Nadu Legislative Assembly election : Thiruvottiyur
Party	Candidate	Votes	%	±%
AIADMK	K. Kuppan	93,944	57.03%	▲11.70
DMK	K. P. P. Samy	66,653	40.47%	▼5.87
BJP	V. Venkata Krishnan	1,719	1.04%	▲0.17
Margin of victory		27,291	16.57%	▲15.56
Total valid votes		164,716		
Rejected ballots		107	0.00%	
Registered electors		221,495		▼55.37
AIADMK gain from DMK		Swing	▲10.69	

=== 2006 ===
2006 Tamil Nadu Legislative Assembly election : Thiruvottiyur
Party	Candidate	Votes	%	±%
DMK	K. P. P. Samy	158,204	46.34%	New
AIADMK	V. Moorthy	154,757	45.33%	New
DMDK	S. Murugan	21,915	6.42%	New
BJP	K. Ganesan	2,977	0.87%	New
Margin of victory		3,447	1.01%	▼15.42
Turnout		341,404	68.79%	▲20.94
Total valid votes		341,402		
Registered electors		496,267		▲14.63
DMK gain from AIADMK		Swing	▼8.60	

=== 2001 ===
2001 Tamil Nadu Legislative Assembly election : Thiruvottiyur
Party	Candidate	Votes	%	±%
AIADMK	T. Arumugam	113,808	54.94%	▲32.29
Independent	Kumari Ananthan	79,767	38.50%	New
MDMK	S. G. Sekar	8,483	4.09%	New
Independent	Bullet J. Selvaraj	2,221	1.07%	New
JD(S)	S. Gunasekaran	1,446	0.70%	New
Margin of victory		34,041	16.43%	▼25.10
Turnout		207,167	47.85%	▼10.10
Total valid votes		207,167		
Registered electors		432,947		▲35.44
AIADMK gain from DMK		Swing	▼9.25	

=== 1996 ===
1996 Tamil Nadu Legislative Assembly election : Thiruvottiyur
Party	Candidate	Votes	%	±%
DMK	T. C. Vijayan	115,939	64.19%	▲25.65
AIADMK	B. Balraj	40,917	22.65%	New
CPI(M)	A. Soundararajan	16,329	9.04%	New
PMK	T. Velmurugan	4,559	2.52%	▼0.64
BJP	S. Nallasivam	1,511	0.84%	▼0.16
Margin of victory		75,022	41.53%	▲23.53
Turnout		185,246	57.95%	▼1.04
Total valid votes		180,624		
Registered electors		319,663		▲21.79
DMK gain from AIADMK		Swing	▲7.65	

=== 1991 ===
1991 Tamil Nadu Legislative Assembly election : Thiruvottiyur
Party	Candidate	Votes	%	±%
AIADMK	K. Kuppan	85,823	56.54%	New
DMK	T. K. Palanisamy	58,501	38.54%	▼7.04
PMK	T. Abbu Gounder	4,796	3.16%	New
BJP	R. Annamalai	1,513	1.00%	New
Margin of victory		27,322	18.00%	▲3.84
Turnout		154,830	58.99%	▼8.11
Total valid votes		151,797		
Registered electors		262,462		▲16.51
AIADMK gain from DMK		Swing	▲10.96	

=== 1989 ===
1989 Tamil Nadu Legislative Assembly election : Thiruvottiyur
Party	Candidate	Votes	%	±%
DMK	T. K. Palanisamy	67,849	45.58%	▲0.90
AIADMK	J. Rama Chandran	46,777	31.42%	New
INC	G. K. J. Bharathi	19,782	13.29%	▼40.97
Independent	K. V. P. Bhoominathan	10,863	7.30%	New
Margin of victory		21,072	14.16%	▲4.58
Turnout		151,160	67.10%	▼5.61
Total valid votes		148,866		
Registered electors		225,272		▲34.38
DMK gain from INC		Swing	▼8.68	

=== 1984 ===
1984 Tamil Nadu Legislative Assembly election : Thiruvottiyur
Party	Candidate	Votes	%	±%
INC	G. K. J. Bharathi	65,194	54.26%	▲10.28
DMK	T. K. Palanisamy	53,684	44.68%	New
Margin of victory		11,510	9.58%	▲6.20
Turnout		121,889	72.71%	▲5.58
Total valid votes		120,141		
Registered electors		167,640		▲8.93
INC gain from GKC		Swing	▲6.90	

=== 1980 ===
1980 Tamil Nadu Legislative Assembly election : Thiruvottiyur
Party	Candidate	Votes	%	±%
GKC	Kumari Ananthan	48,451	47.36%	New
INC	T. Loganathan	44,993	43.98%	New
JP	T. P. Elumalai	8,604	8.41%	New
Margin of victory		3,458	3.38%	▲0.47
Turnout		103,302	67.13%	▲9.36
Total valid votes		102,296		
Registered electors		153,890		▲3.77
GKC gain from AIADMK		Swing	▲16.07	

=== 1977 ===
1977 Tamil Nadu Legislative Assembly election : Thiruvottiyur
Party	Candidate	Votes	%	±%
AIADMK	P. Sigamony	26,458	31.29%	New
DMK	M. V. Narayanaswamy	23,995	28.37%	▼25.37
Independent	C. K. Madhavan	16,888	19.97%	New
JP	B. Mutuswamy Naidu	16,800	19.87%	New
Margin of victory		2,463	2.91%	▼13.89
Turnout		85,676	57.77%	▼9.23
Total valid votes		84,567		
Registered electors		148,299		▼0.77
AIADMK gain from DMK		Swing	▼22.45	

=== 1971 ===
1971 Tamil Nadu Legislative Assembly election : Thiruvottiyur
Party	Candidate	Votes	%	±%
DMK	M. V. Narayanaswamy	51,487	53.74%	▼7.49
INC	Venkatesalu Naidu	35,391	36.94%	New
CPI(M)	C. K. Madhavan	8,057	8.41%	New
Independent	Suriyamuthu	877	0.92%	New
Margin of victory		16,096	16.80%	▼5.67
Turnout		100,131	67.00%	▼8.52
Total valid votes		95,812		
Registered electors		149,448		▲30.86
DMK hold		Swing	▼7.49	

=== 1967 ===
1967 Madras State Legislative Assembly election : Thiruvottiyur
Party	Candidate	Votes	%	±%
DMK	A. P. Arasu	51,437	61.23%	New
INC	V. Venkateswaralu	32,564	38.77%	New
Margin of victory		18,873	22.47%	
Turnout		86,241	75.52%	
Total valid votes		84,001		
Registered electors		114,201		
DMK win (new seat)				
