= Veeranadai =

- Title card
- Directed by: Seeman
- Written by: Seeman
- Produced by: K. Sethu Rajeswaran
- Starring: Sathyaraj; Arun Pandian; Khushbu; Uma
- Cinematography: Ilavarasu
- Edited by: K. K. Pazhanivel
- Music by: Deva
- Production company: Muthu Movies
- Release date: 28 April 2000
- Running time: 138 minutes
- Country: India
- Language: Tamil

Veeranadai (transl. Courageous walk) is a 2000 Indian Tamil-language action drama film written and directed by Seeman. The film stars Sathyaraj, Arun Pandian, Khushbu and debutante Uma. It was released on 28 April 2000.

== Plot ==
The story revolves around two village bigwigs, Periya Karuppan and Kottaisamy. Periya Karuppan, a kindhearted person, is very helpful to his villagers, while Kottaisamy is always jealous of Periya Karuppan and his father.

Periya Karuppan is very affectionate towards his sister, and he gives her in marriage to a young man. After giving birth to a beautiful girl, the couple gets killed in an accident. Periya Karuppan brings up the girl Poomayil and vows not to marry as he has to look after his niece. This disappoints Mallika, who wants to marry Periya Karuppan.

When Poomayil attains marriageable age, a young man is chosen to marry her. Before the day of betrothal she asks her grandfather why her uncle never got married, and the old man replies that he has remained a bachelor only to bring her up. This touches her, and she announces at the betrothal function that she intends to marry only her uncle, who has sacrificed a lot for her sake.

== Cast ==
- Sathyaraj as Periya Karuppan
- Khushbu as Mallika
- Uma as Poomayil
- C. Arunpandian as Kottaisamy
- Goundamani as Ulagavaayan
- Senthil
- Chandrasekhar
- Ponvannan
- Vijaya Chandrika
- Sabitha Anand
- Pasi Sathya
- K. R. Vatsala
- Madurai Saroja
- Scissor Manohar
- Crane Manohar
- Suruli Manohar

== Production ==
Veeranadai is the debut film of Uma.

== Soundtrack ==
The soundtrack was composed by Deva.

Song	Singers	Lyrics
"Kalaiyile"	Krishnaraj, Jayalakshmi, Sabesh, Sushmitha, Amrutha, Yugendran, Prashanthini, Venkat Prabhu	Na. Muthukumar
"Muthu Mutha"	Sujatha	Na. Muthukumar
"Nethi Pottu"	Swarnalatha, Gopal Rao	Seeman
"Singanadai Pottu Vantha"	Gopal Rao	Thamarai
"Usuravechan Mama"	Swarnalatha	Thamarai
"Vaanam Patha Bhoomiyile"	Anuradha Sriram, Gopal Rao	Seeman

== Reception ==
S. R. Ashok Kumar of The Hindu wrote, "An out and out village story, it is handled by director Seeman in an absorbing way but at times he goes astray". Malini Mannath of Chennai Online wrote that the film, despite its title, "is anything but a 'brave walk'. Rather it is a crawling, doddering effort, where the script just refuses to move in any direction". She concluded, "It is a mediocre film not worth a watch".
