= Thanjai Selvi =

Thanjai Selvi is a Tamil singer popular for her rendering of folk songs. She had begun her career in Tamil cinema with the song "Jilla Vittu" from the movie Eesan.

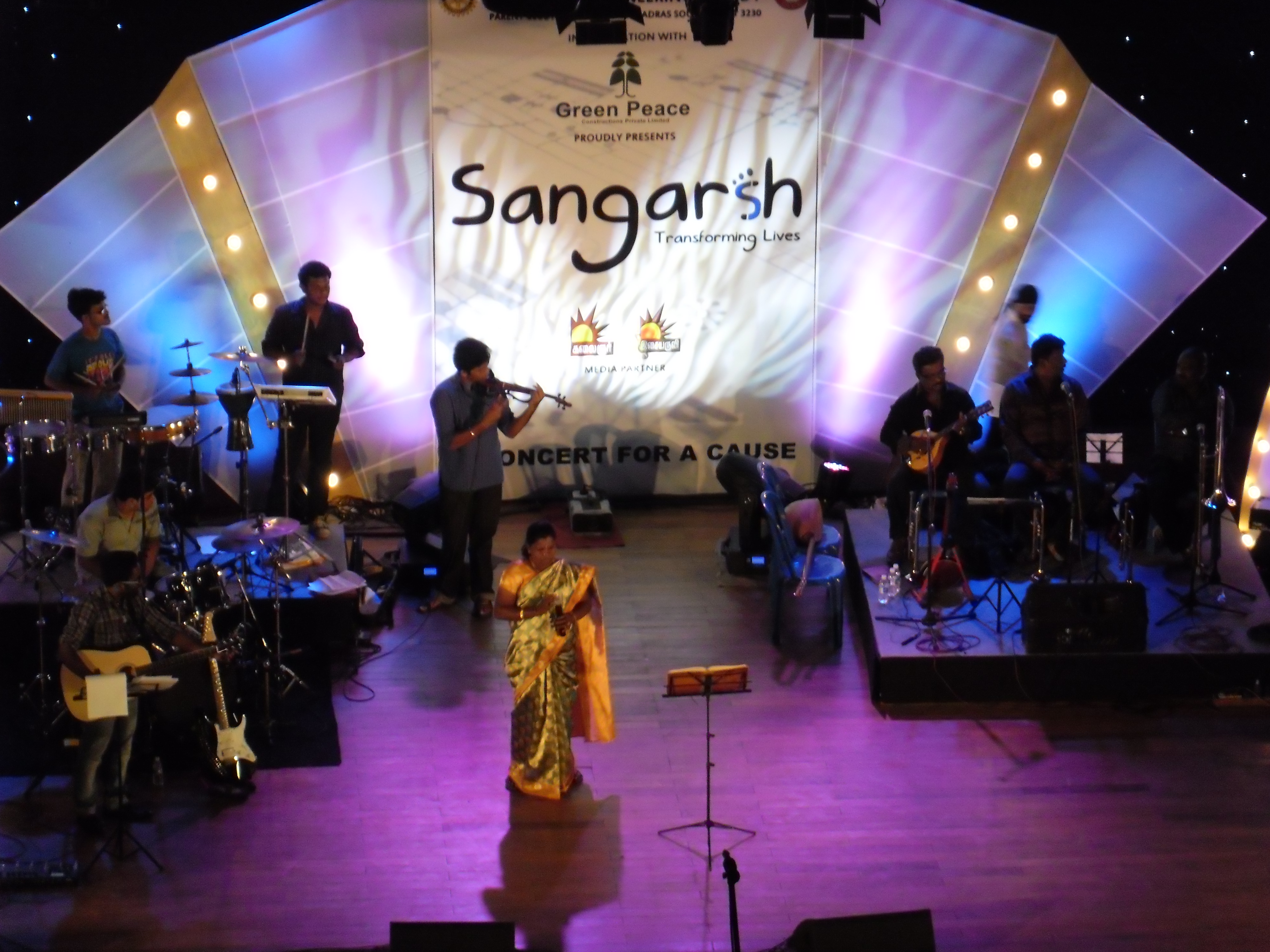
Thanjai Selvi

== Discography ==
Thanjai Selvi has so far sung the following songs. Jilla Vittu from Easan (won Vijay Award for best folk song that year) and Maruthani from Marudhavelu are popular ones.

Year	Film	Song	Language	Composer	Co-Singer(s)
2010	Easan	"Jilla Vittu"	Tamil	James Vasanthan	Solo
2011	Poraali	"Vedi Pottu"	Tamil	Sundar C Babu	Velmurugan
2011	Ambuli	"Aatha Nee Pethaaye"	Tamil	K. Venkat Prabu Shankar	Solo
2011	Marudhavelu	"Maruthani"	Tamil	James Vasanthan	Thanjai Iyappan
2011	Vettaiyadu	"Eaam Maama Madura"	Tamil	SPL Selvadasan	Solo
2011	Azhagarsamiyin Kuthirai	"Adiye Ivale"	Tamil	Ilaiyaraaja	Snehan, Lenin Bharathi, Hemambika, Murugan, Iyyappan, Master Regan, Senthildass Velayutham, Anita
2012	Kondaan Koduthaan	"Thillana Paattukari"	Tamil	Deva	Solo
2012	Ambuli	"Aatha Nee Pethaya"	Tamil	K. Venkat Prabu Shankar	Solo
2013	Madha Yaanai Koottam	"Enga Pora"	Tamil	N. R. Raghunanthan	Solo
2014	Pongadi Neengalum Unga Kadhalum	"Ye Kadhale"	Tamil	Kannan	Solo
2016	Adra Machan Visilu	"Kannamoochi"	Tamil	N. R. Raghunanthan	Anthony Daasan
2016	Azhahendra Sollukku Amudha	"Vysarbadi"	Tamil	Rajin Mahadev	Solo
