= Ashwanth Thilak =

Indian television actor (born 1987)

- Born: 21 November 1987 (age 38); Chennai, India
- Other name: Thilak
- Occupation: Actor
- Years active: 2007–Present
- Relatives: Shari (aunt)

Ashwanth Thilak is an Indian television actor, who has appeared in Tamil language films and television serials.

== Career ==
The son of dance choreographer Seenu, Ashwanth Thilak studies for a career in hotel management before entering the film industry. Ashwanth Thilak began his career as an actor by appearing in T. K. Bose's romantic drama Kodaikanal (2008) alongside Poorna. The film had a low key opening at the box office and won Thilak mixed reviews about his performance. While a critic from KollywoodToday.com wrote he gives a "matured performance" and that "he emotes straight from his shoulders with no flaw", while a reviewer from ThaIndia.com stated Thilak "worsens the proceedings with a listless performance". Thilak then worked on Mani Ratnam's epic adventure film Raavanan, portraying Velan, the fiancé of the character portrayed by Priyamani. Featuring in an ensemble cast with Vikram, Prithviraj and Aishwarya Rai, Raavanan won critical and commercial acclaim upon release.

He also went on to feature in the shelved Neengatha Ninaivugal and in Muthuramalincoln's Snehavin Kadhalarkal (2014) as one of the four lead actors opposite Krithi Shetty (Advaitha). Furthermore, Thilak has made further film appearances in Climax (2013) and Nayagi (2016). Apart from films, Thilak has moved on to work in television serials, notably appearing in Vamsam.

He played one of the leads in the serials Nenjam Marappathillai and Bharya. He played a supporting role in the television serial Run.

== Filmography ==
=== Television ===
Year	Title	Role	Channel	Language
2013–2016	Azhagi	Nandhakumar (Nandha)	Sun TV	Tamil
2013–2014	Thendral	Avinash	Sun TV	Tamil
2014–2017	Vamsam	Muthu / Kaathmuthu	Sun TV	Tamil
2017–2018	Poove Poochudava	Karthik	Zee Tamil	Tamil
2017–2019	Nenjam Marappathillai	Arjun	Star Vijay	Tamil
2018	Nalam Nalamariya Aaval	Satya	Raj TV	Tamil
2019	Bharya	Nandan	Asianet	Malayalam
2019–2020	Run	Prabhu	Sun TV	Tamil
2019–2020	Sundari Neeyum Sundaran Naanum	Saravanan	Star Vijay	Tamil
2020–2024	Vanathai Pola	Vetri	Sun TV	Tamil
2022	Namma Madurai Sisters	Ashwin	Colors Tamil	Tamil
2023–2024	Nala Damayanthi	AGR	Zee Tamil	Tamil
2024–2025	Panivizhum Malarvanam	Ganesh	Star Vijay	Tamil
2024–2025	Sevvathi	Gowtham	Sun TV	Tamil
2024–2025	Karthigai Deepam	Mahesh	Zee Tamil	Tamil
2025	Maari	Vasanth	Zee Tamil	Tamil
2025–Present	Varisu	Premkumar	Zee Tamil	Tamil
2026	Lakshmi	Vasanth	Sun TV	Tamil
2026	Manamagale Vaa	Lokesh	Sun TV	Tamil

=== Films ===
Year	Film	Role	Notes
2007	Malaikottai	Background dancer	
2008	Kodaikanal	Surya	
2008	Poo	Thangarasu's friend	
2010	Raavanan	Velan	
2013	Climax		Malayalam film
2013	Kanna Laddu Thinna Aasaiya	Background dancer in song "Hey Unnathan"	
2014	Snehavin Kadhalarkal	Chinnu	
2015	Enakkul Oruvan	Background dancer in song "Endi Ippadi"	
2016	Inba Nila		
2016	Nayaki		Telugu-Tamil film
2018	Puthiya Bruce Lee	Thilak	
2018	Sarkar	Reporter	
2018	Kaatrin Mozhi		
2018	Kaala	Background dancer in song "Thanga Sela"	
2019	Ispade Rajavum Idhaya Raniyum	Motorbike Driver	
2019	Oh! Baby	Background dancer in song "O Baby"	Telugu film
