= Kondaan Koduthaan =

2012 Indian film by G. Rajendran

- Directed by: G. Rajendran
- Written by: G. Rajendran
- Produced by: Ayyappa
- Starring: Kathirkaman; Advaitha
- Cinematography: G. Rajendran
- Edited by: S. M. V. Subbu
- Music by: Deva
- Production company: Ayyappa Art Films
- Release date: 2 March 2012
- Running time: 126 minutes
- Country: India
- Language: Tamil

Kondaan Koduthaan (transl. He brought it, he gave it) is a 2012 Indian Tamil-language drama film directed by G. Rajendran and starring Kathirkaman and Advaitha.

== Cast ==
- Kathirkaman as Raasu
- Advaitha as Sevandhi
- Ilavarasu as Chellaiya
- Meera Krishnan as Balamani
- Ganja Karuppu as Pachamuthu
- L. Raja as Ganesan
- Raj Kapoor as Mayandi
- Manobala as Mayandi's assistant
- Sulakshana
- Sini as Poonkodi

== Production ==
Kathirkaman, who played the lead in Veluthu Kattu (2010), stars in this film. Advaitha, the lead actress, has played similar roles in Azhagarsamiyin Kuthirai (2011) and Sagakkal (2011). The film was shot in Kallur in twenty-five days. G. Rajendran, in addition to directing and writing the film, also worked as the cinematographer. The film is about two families who married between the families across four generations and how the recent generation tries to go against the norm.

== Soundtrack ==
The songs are composed by Deva. Deva and Rajendran had previously worked together for the film Viralukketha Veekkam (1999).

Song title	Lyricist	Singers
"Thanjavur Gopuram" Version 1	Na. Muthukumar	S. P. Balasubrahmanyam, Chinmayi
"Thanjavur Gopuram" Version 2	Na. Muthukumar	S. P. Balasubrahmanyam
"Thillana Pattukari"	Kabilan	Thanjai Selvi
"Pavadai Pattampuchiye"	Kabilan	Karthik, Chinmayi
"Paatha Pakkure"	Kabilan	Chinmayi, Aathithyaram

== Release and reception ==
The film released on 2 March along with Aravaan. The Times of India gave the film a rating of two-and-a-half out of five stars and noted that "A good watch if you are in the mood for a family drama high on emotion". The Hindu wrote that "Content wise, KK makes a giant leap backwards in time. Would have worked well five decades ago!" Maalai Malar praised the family aspect of the film while criticising the quality of some scenes.
