= Ananthu (singer) =

Indian singer

- Born: Hariharan Ananthu
- Occupation: Singer
- Years active: 1995–present
- Honours: Kalaimamani (2019)

Ananthu is an Indian playback singer known for his work in the Tamil film industry. He is known for his frequent collaborations with Santhosh Narayanan.

== Career ==
Ananthu worked under M. S. Vishwanathan from 1995 to 2015. He garnered acclaim for his song "Puli Urumudhu" in Vettaikaaran (2009), "Ulagam Oruvanukka" and "Maya Nadhi" in Kabali (2016), and "Kannamma" in Kaala (2018).

== Discography ==
=== Tamil songs ===
Year	Film	Song(s)	Composer	Notes
1995	Jameen Kottai	"Thennamara Cholai"	Sirpy	
2005	Aanai	"Chinnajiru Kilye"	D. Imman	
2008	Vasool	"Singapore Ceylon"	Vijay Shankar	
2009	Vettaikaaran	"Puli Urumudhu"	Vijay Antony	
2010	Vamsam	"En Nenje"	Taj Noor	
2010	Irandu Mugam	"Yaanai Ketti"	Bharadwaj	
2011	Nandhi	"Vedhagosham"	Bharadwaj	
2011	Nandhi	"Tanjore Thavil"	Bharadwaj	
2011	Sagakkal	"Kandaangi Selai"	Thayarathnam	
2011	Kasethan Kadavulada	"Panatha Kaatunga"	Karunas	
2013	Isakki	"Ayya Veerasamy"	Srikanth Deva	
2013	Thagaraaru	"Nanba Nanba"	Dharan Kumar	
2013	Muthu Nagaram	"Cheerum Puli"	Jayaprakash	
2014	Vallavanukku Pullum Aayudham	"Theme Song"	Siddharth Vipin	
2014	Aranmanai	"Unnaye Enniye"	Bharathwaj	
2015	Komban	"Kambikara Vetti"	G. V. Prakash Kumar	
2015	En Vazhi Thani Vazhi	"En Vazhi Thani Vazhi"	Srikanth Deva	
2016	Tharai Thappattai	"Aarambam Aavadhu"	Ilaiyaraaja	
2016	Pichaikkaran	"Pichaikkaran (Theme Music)"	Vijay Antony	
2016	Kadhalum Kadandhu Pogum	"Ka Ka Ka Po"	Santhosh Narayanan	
2016	Iraivi	"Manidhi"	Santhosh Narayanan	
2016	Kabali	"Ulagam Oruvanukka"	Santhosh Narayanan	
2016	Kabali	"Maya Nadhi"	Santhosh Narayanan	Nominated–IIFA Utsavam Award for Best Playback Singer - Male - Tamil
2016	Kaashmora	"Jagadhammaa"	Santhosh Narayanan	
2017	Bairavaa	"Pattaya Kelappu"	Santhosh Narayanan	
2017	Ayyanar Veethi	"Vaararu Ayyan Varaaru"	U. K. Murali	
2017	Pa. Pandi	"Vaanam" "(The Life of Power Paandi)"	Sean Roldan	
2018	Kaala	"Thanga Sela"	Santhosh Narayanan	
2018	Kaala	"Kannamma"	Santhosh Narayanan	
2018	Kaala	"Kannamma (Acapella)"	Santhosh Narayanan	
2018	Kaala	"Urimayai Meetpom"	Santhosh Narayanan	
2019	Kaaviyyan	"Ethuvandha Enna"	Syam Mohan	
2020	Ettuthikkum Para	"Vaadi Chellam"	M. S. Sreekanth	
2020	Maara	"Kaathirunthen"	Ghibran	
2020	Gypsy	"Manamengum Maaya Oonjaal"	Santhosh Narayanan	
2021	Jai Bhim	"Sendumalli Ya Manakara Nee"	Sean Roldan	
2023	Mark Antony	"Karuppana Saamy"	G. V. Prakash Kumar	
2024	Kalki 2898 AD	"Theme of Kalki"	Santhosh Narayanan	
2025	Retro	"Edharkaga Marubadi”	Santhosh Narayanan	
2025	3BHK	"Kanavellam"	Amrit Ramnath	
TBA	Server Sundaram	"Nirkadhey"	Santhosh Narayanan	

=== Telugu songs ===
Year	Film	Song(s)	Composer	Notes
2006	Astram	"Prema Kanna"	S. A. Rajkumar	
2012	Daruvu	"Thom Thom"	Vijay Antony	
2016	Bichagadu	"Bichagadu Theme"	Vijay Antony	Dubbed
2016	Kabali	"Okade Okkokokade"	Santhosh Narayanan	Dubbed
2016	Kabali	"Gunde Ninna Yenno"	Santhosh Narayanan	Dubbed
2016	Kaashmora	"Jagadamma"	Santhosh Narayanan	Dubbed
2017	Guru	"Ey Pataakey"	Santhosh Narayanan	
2018	Kaala	"Chittamma"	Santhosh Narayanan	Dubbed
2018	Saakshyam	"Dung Dung Dung"	Harshavardhan Rameshwar	
2018	Maari 2	"Maari's Aanandhi"	Yuvan Shankar Raja	Dubbed
2024	Kalki 2898 AD	"Theme of Kalki"	Santhosh Narayanan	

=== Other language songs ===
Year	Film	Song(s)	Composer	Language	Notes
2010	Pokkiri Raja	"Manickya Kallil"	Jassie Gift	Malayalam	co-sung with Jassie Gift, Malathy
2016	Kabali	"Jadoo Rawan Rawan"	Santhosh Narayanan	Hindi	Dubbed
2018	Kaala	"Sajna"	Santhosh Narayanan	Hindi	Dubbed
2024	Kalki 2898 AD	"Theme of Kalki"	Santhosh Narayanan	Hindi	Dubbed
2025	Maadeva	"Ma Ma Maadeva"	Pradyotthan	Kannada	

== Television ==
Year	Title	Role	Channel	Notes
2019–2021	Singing Stars	Judge	Colors Tamil	
