= Nellai Santhippu =

2012 Tamil film by K.B.B. Naveen

- Directed by: K.B.B. Naveen
- Written by: K.B.B. Naveen; M. G. Kanniyappan (dialogues)
- Produced by: Thirumalai
- Starring: Rohith; Bhushan; Megha Nair; Devika
- Cinematography: Seviloraja
- Edited by: K.B.B. Naveen
- Music by: Yugendran
- Production company: T. Creations
- Release date: 18 September 2012
- Country: India
- Language: Tamil

Nellai Santhippu (transl. Tirunelveli rendezvous) is a 2012 Indian Tamil-language crime thriller film directed by K.B.B. Naveen and starring Rohith, Bhushan, Megha Nair, and Devika.

== Cast ==
- Rohith
- Bhushan
- Megha Nair as Lalitha
- Devika Madhav as Manju
- P. L. Thenappan
- Saravana Subbiah as Sethu
- L. Raja
- Yogi Devaraj as Annachi
- Mayilsamy as a textile seller
- Lakshmy Ramakrishnan as a doctor
- Meera Krishnan
- Babilona
- Dinakaran Devaraj

== Production ==
K.B.B.Naveen, who worked as an assistant director to K. S. Ravikumar, made his directorial debut with this film. The film is produced by Thirumalai. Newcomer Rohith plays the lead while P. L. Thenappan plays the antagonist. The film was shot in Tirunelveli. The other lead roles are played by newcomer Bhushan, Megha Nair, and Devika while Saravana Subbiah plays an important role.

== Soundtrack ==
The songs are composed by Yugendran.

Song	Lyricist(s)	Singer(s)
"Idhuthane Engal Veedu"	Andal Priyadarshini	Prasanna, Yugendran
"Kalavani Kalavani"	M. G. Kanniappan	Mukesh Mohamed, Anuradha Sriram
"Kannamuchi Kannamuchi"	Eknath	Yugendran, Rita
"Vizhigalil Udhiruthe"	Anbudan Buhari	Vijay Yesudas, Bala Abirami
"Manitha Manitha"	K. B. B. Naveen, D. J. Kumar	Yugendran

== Release ==
The Times of India gave the film a rating of one-and-a-half out of five stars and noted that "The fairly engaging script even helps gloss over the fact that the lead actors can't emote". The New Indian Express wrote that "The knot did have the potential to turn into an engaging thriller, but fails". A critic from Dinamalar praised the story, but criticized the below par execution.
