= Broken Journey (disambiguation) =

Broken Journey is a 1948 film. Other publications and productions with the same or similar title include:

== Film ==
- The Broken Journey (Bengali: Uttoran) is a 1994 Bengali drama film.

== Television ==
- "Broken Journey" (television episode), television drama starring David Niven, originally aired on Four Star Playhouse, 2 June 1955 (Season 3, Episode 35).

== Stage Play ==
- Broken Journey, adapted by Glyn Maxwell from Akutagawa story "In a Grove" and Kurosawa's film Rashomon, first performed off-Broadway in 2005, first performed at Welwyn Garden City, Hertfordshire in 1996.

== Books ==
- Broken Journey (book and audiobook) by Janet Woods, 2007.
- Broken Journey: A True Story of Courage and Survival by Jennifer Murray, 2006.
- A Broken Journey: A Novel by Morley Callaghan, 1932, revised 1976.
- A Broken Journey: Wanderings from the Hoang-Ho to the Island of Saghalien and the Upper Reaches of the Amur River by Mary Eliza Bakewell Gaunt, 2010.
- Broken: A Journey of Depression and Disbelief by Douglas R. Tull Jr., 2014.

== Games ==
- Broken Journey, (Dayz Overpoch series), video and online computer game.
