= Aashritha =

Indian actress

- Born: Madurai, Tamil Nadu, India
- Occupation: Actress
- Years active: 2013–present

Aashritha is an Indian actress who has appeared in Tamil language films. She made her debut in the Tamil film Isakki (2013). She has also acted in films including Orange Mittai (2015) and Azhahendra Sollukku Amudha (2016).

== Career ==
Aashritha was born in Madurai to a Tamil family. She did modelling for print advertisements, while also winning the Vivel Miss South India's Beautiful Face pageant and finishing runner up in the Miss Andhra Pradesh contest. Following appearances in beauty pageants, Aashritha made her acting debut in the low-budget village-centric film Isakki (2013), where she portrayed a teacher. A critic from The Times of India noted that "Aashrita makes a decent debut as a strong and independent woman who stands up to her father". In 2014, she played the female lead opposite Akhil in Dhanush 5am Vaguppu, which had a low-key release. In 2015, she played the lead female role opposite Ramesh Thilak in Vijay Sethupathi's production Orange Mittai (2015), portraying a town girl called Kavya. The film opened to positive reviews, but did not perform well at the box office.

Aashritha then moved on to work on Nagaraj's Azhahendra Sollukku Amudha, playing the titular role, after auditioning successfully for the film.

== Filmography ==
Year	Film	Role	Notes
2013	Isakki	Nandhini	
2014	Dhanush 5am Vaguppu		
2015	Orange Mittai	Kavya	
2016	Azhahendra Sollukku Amudha	Amudha	
