= Azhahendra Sollukku Amudha =

2016 Indian film by Nagarajan

- Theatrical release poster
- Directed by: Nagarajan
- Written by: Nagarajan
- Produced by: Rafael Saldana
- Starring: Rejan; Aashritha
- Edited by: Gopi Krishna
- Music by: Rajin Mahadev
- Production company: Ralph Productions
- Release date: 2 December 2016
- Running time: 138 minutes
- Country: India
- Language: Tamil

Azhahendra Sollukku Amudha (transl. Amudha is an example for beauty) is a 2016 Indian Tamil-language romantic drama film directed by Nagarajan and starring Rejan and Aashritha.

== Cast ==
- Rejan as Murugan
- Aashritha as Amudha
- Pattimandram Raja as Murugan's father
- Rekha Suresh as Murugan's mother
- Mahanadi Shankar
- Mippu

== Production ==
The film was directed by Suseenthiran's assistant Rejan. It was shot in locations including Chennai, Ennore, Perambur, Thandyarpet, and Vyasarpadi.

== Soundtrack ==
The songs are composed by Rajin Mahadev.

Track listing
No.	Title	Singer(s)	Length
1.	"Naan Kaaylankada"	Gana Bala	4:27
2.	"Usara Adichi"	Jithin, Priyanka	4:26
3.	"Vysarbadi"	Thanjai Selvi	4:21
4.	"En Devadhayoda"	Priyanka B. Jagadeesh	5:27
5.	"Naan Kaaylankada"	Rajin Mahadev	4:27
Total length:			23:08

== Release and reception ==
The film released on 2 December 2016, and was removed from theatres three days later due to the then Chief Minister of Tamil Nadu J. Jayalalithaa's death. The Times of India gave the film a rating of one out of five stars and wrote that "the film is, sadly, a concoction of numerous bad clichés one has seen in Tamil cinema over the years". Hindu Tamil Thisai praised the cinematography and music while criticising the climax. Maalai Malar gave the film a rating of eighty out of hundred and praised the cinematography and songs. Samayam gave the film a rating of three out of five praising the songs and criticising the screenplay.
