= Orange Mittai =

2015 Indian film by Biju Viswanath

- Theatrical release poster
- Directed by: Biju Viswanath
- Written by: Biju Viswanath; Vijay Sethupathi
- Produced by: Vijay Sethupathi; B. Ganesh
- Starring: Vijay Sethupathi; Ramesh Thilak; Aashritha; Aaru Bala; Karunakaran
- Cinematography: Biju Viswanath
- Edited by: Biju Viswanath
- Music by: Justin Prabhakaran
- Production companies: Vijay Sethupathi Productions; Common Man
- Distributed by: Cosmo Village
- Release date: 31 July 2015
- Running time: 101 minutes
- Country: India
- Language: Tamil

Orange Mittai (transl. Orange Candy) is a 2015 Indian Tamil-language road comedy drama film co-written and directed by Biju Viswanath. Produced by Vijay Sethupathi, the film stars him alongside Ramesh Thilak, Aashritha, Aaru Bala and Karunakaran. The film began production in mid-2014. It was released in India and abroad on 31 July 2015. The film had its festival premiere at the 20th Busan International Film Festival.

== Plot ==
Sathya is a paramedic with an emergency ambulance service. On the anniversary of his father's death, Sathya and the ambulance driver are to retrieve an old man who claims to be critically ill. The patient, Kailasam, boards the vehicle. His earlier claim to be fighting for his life is not apparent, although he has a heart condition. Kailasam's grumpy and obstinate nature causes trouble to the crew as they journey to find a hospital that suites his needs. Who is Kailasam? What does he want? What is the cause behind his adamant nature? The answers to these questions form the crux of the story. The old man needs to find a hospital that will have him, but it is a long way to go. The only way to find out what the universe has planned is to make the journey, and sometimes the journey is the destination.

== Cast ==
- Vijay Sethupathi as Kailasam
- Ramesh Thilak as Sathya
- Aaru Bala as Arumugam
- Aashritha as Kavya
- Karunakaran as Kailasam's son
- David Solomon Raja as Sub-Inspector
- Trichy Manivannan as Kavya's father
- Vinod Sagar as Drunkard
- Vishalini as Doctor
- Madan as Doctor
- Tamilselvi as Sister
- T. Anbalagan as Villager
- Karthik Durai as Auto Driver
- Sadagopan as Constable
- Anand Abhi as Thief
- Vellaichamy as Old Man
- Ashok Selvan as New EMT (guest appearance)
- Bobby Simha as Supervisor (voice)

== Production ==
Actor Vijay Sethupathi launched his production, Orange Mittai, in February 2014 and signed up director Biju Viswanath to direct the venture. The film was said to feature an ensemble cast including Jayaprakash, Ramesh Thilak, Aaru Bala and Aashritha, with Sethupathi stating he would not play a role. However, in July 2014, Sethupathi revealed that he would play a 55-year-old man in the film and promotional stills were released, replacing Jayaprakash in the character. He was also making a debut as a dialogue writer with this film. The team shot in Ambasamuthiram and other places surrounding Tirunelveli and Papanasam in South Tamil Nadu.

== Soundtrack ==
The soundtrack album was composed by Justin Prabhakaran, who had earlier done the same for Sethupathi's Pannaiyarum Padminiyum. It was released on 1 July 2015. Karthik of Milliblog wrote, "Justin hits it out of the park for the two songs not polluted by Vijay Sethupathi’s musical aspirations!".

Track listing
No.	Title	Lyrics	Singer(s)	Length
1.	"Straight Ah Poyee"	Vijay Sethupathi	Vijay Sethupathi
2.	"Theeraadhae Asaigal"	Justin Prabhakaran	Karthik
3.	"Orae Oru Oorula"	Vijay Sethupathi	Vijay Sethupathi
4.	"Payanangal Thodarudhae"	Kattalai Jaya	Naresh Iyer, Padmalatha

== Marketing and release ==
The first teaser of the film was released on 26 November 2014. In June 2015, a promo of the song "Straigh Ah Poyee" was released. Orange Mittai had its worldwide theatrical release on 31 July 2015.

== Critical reception ==
S. Saraswathi from Rediff.com gave the film 3.5 out of 5 stars and wrote, "Like the candy it is named after, Orange Mittai with its sweet and sour moments, is a beautifully narrated film with just the right balance of humour and emotions." Nandita Ravi from The Times of India gave it 3 stars out of 5 and wrote, "Overall, like an orange mittai, the film too is bittersweet. The biggest plus of the film is its run time – a mere one hour and forty minutes, which seems to be more than enough to narrate this interesting story. The film ends on the note that "the journey is the destination", which about sums up the feeling that you get while watching this film". Baradwaj Rangan writing for The Hindu called Orange Mittai "a quiet ode to the bittersweet life". Gautaman Bhaskaran of Hindustan Times gave a 3.5 rating out of 5 stating, "This old-age loneliness tale is a must-see".
