= Yaanum Theeyavan =

2017 film by Prashanth G. Sekar

- Directed by: Prashanth G. Sekar
- Written by: Prashanth G. Sekar
- Produced by: Sophia Jerome; Pepitta Jerome
- Starring: Ashwin Jerome; Varsha Bollamma; Raju Sundaram
- Cinematography: Shreyaas Krishna
- Edited by: Prasanna GK
- Music by: Achu Rajamani
- Production company: Peppy Cinemas
- Release date: 30 June 2017
- Running time: 106 Minutes
- Country: India
- Language: Tamil

Yaanum Theeyavan (lit. 'I am bad, too') is a 2017 Indian Tamil action romantic action thriller film written and directed by Prashanth G. Sekar in his directorial debut. The film features newcomer Ashwin Jerome along with Varsha Bollamma and Raju Sundaram in the lead roles. The music was composed by Achu Rajamani with cinematography by Shreyaas Krishna and editing by Prasanna GK. The film released on 30 June 2017.

This movie claims to collectively represent a number of true events, put together under one shell with imaginative screenplay and characters.

== Plot ==
The story revolves around three people: Michael (Ashwin Jerome), Soumya (Varsha Bollamma), and Pasupathy (Raju Sundaram). The plot forms around how the three characters meet and what happens after their meeting.

== Cast ==
- Ashwin Jerome as Michael (Mike)
- Varsha Bollamma as Soumya
- Raju Sundaram as Pasupathy
- Ponvannan as Jayaprakash
- VTV Ganesh as Sundaramurthi
- Santhana Bharathi as Sethuramalingam
- Shankar Guru Raja
- Jangiri Madhumitha as Madhu
- Arunraja Kamaraj as Arun
- Meera Krishnan as Soumya's mother
- Boys Rajan as Soumya's father
- L. Raja as Manimaran
- Kaajal Pasupathi as Prostitute
- Madhan Kodees as Sada
- Pari Elavazhagan as Pipe Prakash
- Hello Kandasamy as Sethuramalingam's assistant
- Abishek Raaja
- Shaan Kumar
- Rishikanth Rajendran
- Praveen Joseph

== Production ==
Prashanth G. Sekar worked as an assistant director to directors Vignesh Shivan and Hari in Podaa Podi (2012) and Singam II (2013), respectively. After a lot of hunting for the roles of Pasupathy and Soumya, Raju Sundaram and Varsha Bollamma were respectively fixed. Sundaram was reported to playing as a serial killer in this flick. Shreyaas Krishna, the cinematographer of the film, was also the cinematographer for Jil Jung Juk (2016).

The movie went on floors on 22 July 2015. It was shot extensively for two schedules from July through September 2015 in and around Chennai, most of it in and around Chromepet. The shooting was wrapped up on 14 September 2015.

== Soundtrack ==
The music was composed by Achu Rajamani. Lyricists Kabilan and Mani Amuthavan have penned two songs each, and Achu himself has written a song.

- "Nenjukkulle" - Suchith Suresan
- "Nila Nila" - Jithin Raj, Swetha Menon
- "Yaanum Theeyavan" - Achu
- "Aagaayame" - Yaamini

== Critical reception ==
The Hindu wrote, "We expect this remarkably bland love story to turn into a thriller. But no such luck." Deccan Chronicle wrote "The problem with the script is an ordinary story with underdeveloped characters. The director could have infused more thrilling elements to hold the tension. The movie had all the potential to become an engaging thriller had the director concentrated more on a coherent screenplay with solid writing." Baradwaj Rangan of Film Companion wrote, "With better writing, Yaanum Theeyavan could have been something, but it’s still not dismissible, if only because the director believes in using the camera to tell his tale."
