= L. Raja =

Indian director, actor

- Born: Lingaswamy Kasthuri B Venkat Raja
- Other name: Shankar Guru Raja
- Occupations: Director; actor
- Years active: 1987–present
- Spouse: Eshwari Rao
- Children: 2

L. Raja is an Indian director and actor who works in predominantly Tamil language films and television series.

== Career ==
Raja began his career as an assistant to director Rajasekhar. He debuted as a director with Shankar Guru in 1987, which was produced by AVM Productions. He worked as a director in nine films, six of which starred Arjun. After a sabbatical of around 18 years, a director approached Raja and asked him to act in the feature film Muniyandi Vilangial Moonramandu in 2008, which marked his acting debut. He has since acted in 35 films including Naadodigal, where he played Sasikumar's father.

He debuted in television with Raghuvamsam which received positive reviews. He has since acted in several television series and directed two series: Idhi Kadha Kaadhu and Ninne Pelladutha for Radaan Mediaworks. He also directed Himsaveda, a silent dance drama for AVM Productions.

== Personal life ==
Raja is married to actress Easwari Rao. The couple has 2 children.

== Filmography ==
=== As director ===
==== Films ====
Year	Film	Notes
1987	Shankar Guru	
1988	Thaimel Aanai	
1988	Kalicharan	
1989	Kuttravali	
1989	Vettaiyaadu Vilaiyaadu	
1989	Sonthakkaran	
1992	Soori	Kannada film

==== Serials ====
Year	Show	Language	Channel
1995	Raghuvamsam	Tamil	Sun TV
2000	Senior Junior	Tamil	Sun TV
1998–2001	Idhi Kadha Kaadhu	Telugu	ETV
2001–2005	Ninne Pelladutha	Telugu	Gemini TV

=== As an actor ===
==== Films ====
Year	Film	Role	Notes
1986	Vikram	Hussain	
1990	Pudhu Varisu	Manager	
2008	Muniyandi Vilangial Moonramandu	Ramaiyya	
2009	Naadodigal	Natraj Veerabhadran	
2010	Veluthu Kattu	Marudachalam	
2010	Thillalangadi	Krishna Kumar's father	
2010	Kalloori Kalangal	Shankar	
2010	Agam Puram	Martin Fernandez	
2010	Apoorvaragam	Nancy's father	Malayalam film
2011	Margazhi 16	Jennifer's father	
2011	Bodinayakkanur Ganesan	Azhagar	
2011	Kasethan Kadavulada		
2011	Vithagan	DC Gopal	
2012	Kondaan Koduthaan	Ganesan	
2012	Raattinam	Dhanam's father	
2012	Nellai Santhippu		
2012	Thiruthani	Doctor	
2012	Vavval Pasanga	Kasi's father	
2013	Singam II	SP	
2016	Metro	Arivazhagan's father	
2017	Ayyanar Veethi		
2017	Yaanum Theeyavan	Manimaran	
2017	Chennai 2 Singapore	Roshini's father	
2018	Iravukku Aayiram Kangal	Suseela's father	
2019	Pancharaaksharam	Dharma's father	

==== Serials ====
Year	Show	Role	Language	Channel
1995–1996	Raghuvamsam		Tamil	Sun TV
1997	Ethanai Manidhargal		Tamil	Doordarshan
2000–2001	Vazhkai		Tamil	Sun TV
2011–2012	Pirivom Santhippom	Shanmugaraja	Tamil	Star Vijay
2011–2012	No.23 Mahalakshmi Nivasam		Telugu	Gemini TV
2011–2013	Uthiripookkal	Dakshinamoorthy	Tamil	Sun TV
2012	Maa Naana	Rajendra Prasad	Telugu	Gemini TV
2014–2018	Thamarai	Dr. Karunakaran	Tamil	Sun TV
2017	Ganga	Ramanathan	Tamil	Sun TV
2017–2018	Nenjam Marappathillai	R. Velraj	Tamil	Star Vijay
2017–2019	Poove Poochudava	Swaminathan	Tamil	Zee Tamil
2018–2019	Kanmani	Dharmadurai	Tamil	Sun TV
2019	Ponnukku Thanga Manasu		Tamil	Star Vijay
2019–2023	Rettai Roja	Ramachandran	Tamil	Zee Tamil
2021–2023	Sundari	Sankarapandian	Tamil	Sun TV
2021–2023	Thendral Vanthu Ennai Thodum	Aranganathan	Tamil	Star Vijay
2022–2024	Iniya	Nallasivam	Tamil	Sun TV
2025–2026	Getti Melam	Eshwaramoorthy	Tamil	Zee Tamil
