= Snehavin Kadhalarkal =

2014 Indian film by Muthuramalincoln

- Directed by: Muthuramalincoln
- Screenplay by: Muthuramalincoln; R.Prabahar
- Story by: Muthuramalincoln
- Produced by: Ka.Kalaikotudhaiyam; Mrs. Amala Kalaikotudhaiyam
- Starring: Advaitha; Thilak; Uday; Athif Jey; Rathnakumar
- Cinematography: Anand
- Edited by: Shyjith Kumaran
- Music by: R. Prabahar
- Production company: Tamilan Kalaikkoodam
- Distributed by: Raghuvaran
- Release date: 15 August 2014
- Country: India
- Language: Tamil

Snehavin Kadhalarkal (transl. Sneha's lovers) is a 2014 Indian Tamil language film written and directed by Muthuramalincoln. The film features Advaitha who plays the leading role of Sneha, with the storyline revolving around the men who come into her life.

== Cast ==
- Advaitha as Sneha
- Thilak as Chinnu
- Udaykumar
- Athif Jey
- Rathna Kumar

== Production ==
Snehavin Kathalargal

Soundtrack album by R. Prabhar
- Released: 2014
- Recorded: 2014
- Genre: Soundtrack

R. Prabhar chronology
Sun Sun Thatha (2008)	Snehavin Kathalargal (2014)

The film was produced by Mr. Ka.Kalaikotudhaiyam and Mrs. Amala Kalaikotudhaiyam on behalf of Tamilan Kalaikoodam.

== Music ==
The soundtrack was composed by R. Prabahar. and consists of five songs which were released on 19 February 2014 at Prasad Studios Lab Theatre, Chennai, by producer Mr. Keyar.

== Release and reception ==
The film was released on 15 August 2014.

Sify wrote that "On the whole, Snehavin Kadhalargal is not a movie you would remember after watching. Had the director at least got the melodramatic acting toned down, this movie would have been watchable".
