= Agam Puram =

- Poster
- Directed by: Thirumalai
- Written by: Thirumalai
- Produced by: Thirumalai
- Starring: Shaam; Meenakshi
- Cinematography: Y. N. Murali
- Edited by: P. Sai Suresh
- Music by: Sundar C Babu
- Production company: T. Creations
- Release date: 10 December 2010
- Running time: 124 minutes
- Country: India
- Language: Tamil

Agam Puram (transl. Internal and external) is a 2010 Indian Tamil language action film written and directed by Thirumalai. The long-delayed film started production in early 2008 and features Shaam and Meenakshi in the lead roles with Raja and Anandaraj. It was released on 10 December 2010.

== Plot ==
Thiru (Shaam) who was raised by Martin Fernandes (Raja) grows up to be his foster father's right hand. Soon, the aging Fernandez passes away, leaving his assets to Thiru who then takes up the reins of the former's drug business. But his strict working style irks his partners who turn against him. Gradually, he realizes the consequences of his illegal business on his family and friends. How he handles his dilemma forms the crux of the story.

== Cast ==
- Kick Shaam as Thiru
- Meenakshi as Nadiya
- Anandaraj as Muthuraj
- Meera Krishnan as Thiru's mother
- Sampath Ram as Sampath
- Raja as Martin Fernandes
- Manobala as C. Singamuthu
- Anu Mohan as a police officer
- Alex as Thiru's uncle
- Cheranraj as Harichandran
- Vinod Raj as Saamipillai
- Scissor Manohar as a police constable
- Kovai Babu as Thiru's friend
- Cool Suresh as Thiru's friend
- Moogambikai Ravi
- Billy Murali
- Kashmera Shah (special appearance in the song ""Oru Mani Rendu Mani")
- Megha Khan (special appearance in the song "Kattil Mel Adithadia")
- Saran as Rocket (uncredited)

== Production ==
Agam Puram began production at the end of January 2008 with Keerath playing the female lead opposite Shaam with M. Gopalakrishnan financing the film. Meenakshi was later cast as the lead actress and worked on this film after Karuppusamy Kuththagaithaarar (2007). She played an orphan in the film. The film was titled Agam Puram due to the director's passions for literature and also due to the fact that "Agam Puram" means "two-sided", which relates to Shaam's double sided character. Shaam became the film's producer in 2010 after M. Gopalakrishnan left the film. However, Thirumalai, the film's director, produced the film under his banner T. Creations. Shaam worked out to prepare for his role as a gangster. The film was shot in Malaysia and Spain. Newcomer Megha Khan was cast in the film.

== Soundtrack ==
The soundtrack was composed by Sundar C. Babu. The song "Onu Mani Rendu Mani" is a folk song. The song "Kangalai Parithidum" was shot in Malaysia and "Kangal Modhi" was shot in Venice.

Songs	Singer(s)	Lyricist
"Orea Oru Ooru"	Shankar Mahadevan	Eknaath
"Oru Mani Rendu Mani"	P. P. Venkat	V. Elango
"Kangalai Parithidum"	Karthik, Ranjini Josh	Viveka
"Kangal Modhi"	Naresh Iyer, Vijitha	Eknaath
"Kattil Mel Adithadia"	Ranjith, Sayanora Philip	V. Elango
"Agam Puram" Theme Music	Instrumental	—N/a

== Reception ==
A critic from The New Indian Express wrote that "But most of the information we collect, are from dialogues, the characters barely flushed out in the screenplay. The scenes lack depth and intensity, the narration is flat and bland, without any highs or lows". A critic from The Hindu wrote that "Director Thirumalai, it's obvious, wishes to present a story with unexpected twists. Only that the attempt misfires and he ends up with a product that lacks cohesion". A critic from Dinamalar praised the performance of the lead cast and the story.

After the success of Kick (2009), this film was dubbed in Telugu and released as Gang War in 2011.
