= Kayitham =

- காயிதம்
- Genre: Soap opera
- Directed by: V. Gowthaman
- Starring: Divya Padmini; Dheena; Muthupandi
- Country of origin: India
- Original language: Tamil
- No. of seasons: 1
- No. of episodes: 139

Production
- Producer: Samuthirakani
- Camera setup: Multi-camera
- Running time: approx. 20-22 minutes per episode

Original release
- Network: Puthuyugam TV
- Release: 23 November 2013 – 16 May 2014

Kayitham (Tamil: காயிதம்) (transl. Paper) is an Indian Tamil soap opera that aired on Puthuyugam TV from 23 November 2013 to 16 May 2014 on Monday through Friday at 7:00PM IST for 139 episodes.

The show stars Divya Padmini, Dheena, Muthupandi, Sivakami and Karthika. The show is produced by Samuthirakani and directed by V. Gowthaman. The serial deals with the problems and relationships of people from the downtrodden society.

== Plot summary ==
Kuyyan lives in the slum of Nethilikkuppam in Chennai along with his mother. He lives as a loafer, drinks a lot and robs money from people to survive with his drinking. Annakkili is his mother who's having trouble in finding a girl for his son as his attitude doesn't fit any family at all. Moreover, the people living nearby the slum already know about Kuyyan and so they're not ready to find a girl for him. However, Kuyyan's mother manages to convince her niece Parvathi to marry her son. But after marriage, when she starts living with Kuyyan she gets disappointed. The locality where they live and its unhygienic conditions are not what she expected in her new home. To top all that, she gets shattered when she finds that her husband is a drunkard and a thief. She starts staying aloof from her husband which in due course makes Kuyyan to realize his mistakes. When he intends to start a new life, the police are not ready for it since they have filed cases against Kuyyan.

There's another character lives in the same slum whose name is Jegathalan. Unlike Kuyyan, he's a wonderful person and is a Kabadi player. Though his father is an alcoholic, his mother Chitrangi works as a maid and supports her son. Jegathalan loves Jacqueline, who's the daughter of Esther. But Esther is not in favor of his love since his father is a drunkard. Whether the police accepts Kuyyan'srealisation and how manages to marry his lady love forms the rest of the story.

== Cast ==
- Divya Padmini as Parvathy
- Dheena
- Muthupandi
- Karthika
- Sivakami
- Sahana
- Sindhu
- Vasuki
- Sheela
- Siva
- Jeyasurya

== International broadcast ==
- In Singapore Tamil Channel on V Thamizh HD.
- In Malaysia Tamil Channel on Astro Vaanavil.
- It airs in United States, Europe and Australia on Athavan TV on Monday through Friday at 6:00PM.
