= Kadhal Palli =

- Directed by: Pavithran
- Written by: Pavithran
- Produced by: N. R. Dhanapalan
- Starring: Vignesh; Suvaluxmi; Vaiyapuri; Sukran; Jawahar
- Cinematography: P. N. Mothi
- Edited by: B. Lenin; V. T. Vijayan
- Music by: Deva
- Production company: NRD Film Circuit
- Release date: 15 August 1997
- Running time: 115 minutes
- Country: India
- Language: Tamil

Kadhal Palli (transl. School of love) is a 1997 Indian Tamil language comedy drama film directed by Pavithran. The film stars Vignesh, Suvaluxmi, Vaiyapuri, Sukran and Jawahar, with Bhaskar Raj, Vichithra, Vinu Chakravarthy and Kumarimuthu playing supporting roles. It was released on 15 August 1997.

== Plot ==
Balu, Palli, Gold, and Kandhan are small-time crooks in Ooty who pose as tour guides and defraud tourists. They are aided by the village belle, Mynaa, who gave them money and food. Balu finds the young women Uma in a container lorry. Uma is unfamiliar with the city, so she asks Balu to bring her to the restaurant and the hotel. His three friends then follow them, and they are all removed from the restaurant and the hotel by the staff. The five eventually eat at a wedding function and subsequently sleep in the street. Afterwards, Uma seduces each of the four friends individually and promises them that she will marry them. The five spend time together and sleep in the same room. The police are looking for Uma. Uma faints and the doctor informs her that she is pregnant. The four friends pretend to be the father of the baby, but Uma is in denial.

== Cast ==
- Vignesh as Balu
- Suvaluxmi as Uma
- Vaiyapuri as Palli
- Sukran as Gold
- Jawahar as Kandhan
- Bhaskar Raj as Sanjay
- Vichithra as Mynaa
- Vinu Chakravarthy
- Kumarimuthu as Kirupakaran
- Prathapachandran
- Junior Balaiah
- Pasi Narayanan
- Vimalraj as Vimal
- Rani

== Production ==
Laila opted out of the film and was replaced by Suvaluxmi.

== Soundtrack ==
The music was composed by Deva.

Track listing
No.	Title	Lyrics	Singer(s)	Length
1.	"Achani"	Vaasan	S. Janaki	4:31
2.	"Moru Moru"	Vairamuthu	Anuradha Sriram	4:17
3.	"Kadhali"	Vairamuthu	P. Unnikrishnan, K. S. Chithra	5:14
4.	"Mesopattomiya"	Vaasan	Mano	5:49
5.	"Vollan Gothiya"	Vairamuthu	Mano, Swarnalatha	4:34
Total length:				23:25

== Release and reception ==
Ji of Kalki wrote Pavithran messed up in script and direction and panned double meaning dialogues and the way Vichitra's character was treated but praised Vaiyapuri's humour and Suvalaxmi's natural acting and concluded saying many of the audience are going towards English films due to these kind of films coming out. The film failed both commercially and critically with the director Pavithran stating, "My only intention was to give the producer some profit. But finally I could satisfy nobody, both the producer and my fans".
