= Puthiya Bruce Lee =

2018 Indian Tamil-language film

- Poster
- Directed by: Mulaiyur A. Sonai
- Starring: Bruce John; Raziya; Ashwanth Thilak
- Music by: Soundaryan
- Production company: Sree Dindigul Venkateshvaraa Pictures
- Release date: 25 May 2018
- Running time: 117 minutes
- Country: India
- Language: Tamil

Puthiya Bruce Lee (transl. The New Bruce Lee) is a 2018 Indian Tamil-language martial arts film written and directed by Mulaiyur A. Sonai on his directorial debut. The film stars a Bruce Lee look-alike actor named Bruce in his acting debut with another newcomer Raziya and Ashwanth Thilak. The film is considered as a Bruceploitation as it had the Lee imitator in the lead role who involved in martial arts related fight scenes for the film. The movie is centered on the legacy of Lee's style of actions.

== Plot ==
Bruce (himself) lives in a village area close to the mountain ranges with his mother. He acts as a single warrior when it comes to dealing with the crisis and other issues that his village faces, and he single-handedly manages to rescue his village from threats. Most of the people in the village also seek Bruce for assistance when they face problematic situations. One day, his mother died from a fire accident which happened in the hut where he lived with his mother. Then his uncle Thennavan Duraisamy takes Bruce along with him to the Madurai City after his mother's death. But the village people request Thennavan Duraisamy to send back Bruce again to their village to safeguard them. On the other hand, Bruce's uncle faces some troubles over selling his real estate property to his friend due to the interruptions of a business person. The entire story revolves around the young man Bruce who comes from a village to the city in order to fight out for his uncle with his fighting skills to solve his uncle's problem over the property.

== Cast ==
- Bruce John
- Raziya
- Ashwanth Thilak as Thilak
- Suresh Narang

== Production ==
The filming process of the film started in 2013 and underwent production delays before its release on 25 May 2018. A. Sonai, who has assisted several film directors, made his maiden directorial venture with Puthiya Bruce Lee. Sonai revealed that the Bruce Lee look-alike Chennai based boy Bruce John would play the prominent role and told that Bruce John has also trained in martial arts and holds double blackbelt in Karate. Sonai also mentioned that the plot of the film is incorporated on Lee's two main important facets of life such as discipline and courage. The team also hired Suresh Narang as the antagonist, who made his acting debut.
