= Ponvannan =

Indian actor

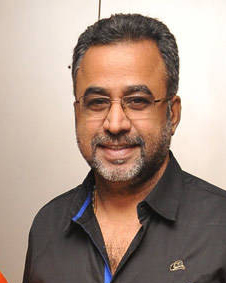
- Born: Shanmugam; 23 September 1964 (age 62); Kallakurichi, Tamil Nadu, India
- Occupations: Actor, Director, Painter
- Spouse: Saranya Ponvannan (m. 1995)
- Children: 2

Ponvannan (born Shanmugam; 23 September 1964) is an Indian actor and director who has worked in Tamil cinema and television. After beginning his career as an artist (painter), Ponvannan apprenticed as a director and writer under Bharathiraja. He subsequently made his directorial debut with Annai Vayal (1992), before making the critically acclaimed venture, Nadhi Karaiyinile (2003). He has since appeared as a supporting actor in films, winning acclaim for his role in films including Paruthiveeran (2007), Ayan (2009) and Kaaviya Thalaivan (2014). In October 2015, he was elected as the Vice President of the Nadigar Sangam alongside Karunas.

== Career ==
Ponvannan began his career as an artist in his home town of Kallakurichi and became acquainted with writer Valampuri John, which led to him working for producer Kovaithambi's Motherland Pictures. Through his exposure, gained at the production house, he began to apprentice under director Bharathiraja and helped the director write dialogues for his films. Ponvannan gradually was introduced as an actor by Bharathiraja and appeared in supporting roles in the director's Pudhu Nellu Pudhu Naathu (1991), Karuthamma (1994) and Pasumpon (1995).

His second directorial venture, Jameela (2003), featuring Suvalakshmi, Rajan P. Dev and Ramji, told the story of an ego clash between two men which ruins the life of an obedient woman. Ponvannan had been impressed with writer Sara Abubakar's novel and bought the script rights, before submitting his screenplay to National Film Development Corporation of India to finance the film. The agency agreed and Jameela was shot for seventeen days in Pondicherry at a cost of 35 lakh rupees. The film won positive reviews in screenings and was well received by critics, prompting it to be selected to be shown in the non-competitive category at the 2002 Shanghai International Film Festival. The film had only a theatrical release across India in November 2003 under the title Nadhi Karaiyinile, after the distributor Viswas Sundar did not want the film to be classified as a "Muslim film".

The film did not perform well at the box office, but won three State film awards including the recognition as Best Film portraying Women in Good Light. The Hindu described Ponvannan's direction as an "absorbing presentation", adding "his sensitivity comes to the fore throughout the film". His next venture, the comedy drama Gomathi Nayagam (2004), had its title taken from the name of his popular character from the television serial Annamalai. The film had a low-key release and did not perform well commercially.

Ponvannan made a comeback as an actor through Ameer's Paruthiveeran (2007), portraying the father of Priyamani's character, and the success of the film garnered further acting opportunities for him. He won acclaim for his performances as the upright police officer in Mysskin's Anjathe (2009) and as the shrewd customs official in Ayan (2009). He wins Tamil Nadu State Film Award for Best Villain for Vaagai Sooda Vaa (2011). Ponvannan played a stage actor in Vasanthabalan's period film Kaaviya Thalaivan (2014), winning acclaim for his performance in an ensemble cast.

== Personal life ==
Ponvannan married National Award-winning actress Saranya, daughter of Malayalam director A. B. Raj, in 1995. They co-starred in Karuthamma (1994).

== Filmography ==
=== As actor ===
Year	Movie	Role	Notes
1991	Pudhu Nellu Pudhu Naathu	Veeraiya	Also dialogue writer
1992	Annai Vayal	Chandran	Also director and writer
1992	Government Mappillai		
1993	Amma Ponnu	Police Inspector	
1993	Kadal Pura		
1993	Captain Magal	Police officer	
1994	Karuththamma	Thavasi	
1995	Pasumpon	Sellasamy	
1995	Gandhi Pirantha Mann		
1995	Chithirai Thiruvizha		
1995	Maaman Magal	Muthurasu	
1996	Vaikarai Pookkal	Soori / Nallathambi	
1996	Katta Panchayathu		
1996	Namma Ooru Raasa	Kailash	
1996	Senathipathi		
1997	Rettai Jadai Vayasu		
1997	Ettupatti Rasa	Ponrasu	
1997	Periya Thambi	Rathnam	
1997	Periya Idathu Mappillai	Chellappa	
1997	Saathi Sanam		
1998	Velai		
1999	Poomagal Oorvalam	Kavitha's father	
1999	Annan	Manikkam	
2000	Kannukkul Nilavu	Soundar	
2000	Veeranadai		
2000	Aandavan		Partial re-shot version of Aatank Hi Aatank (1995)
2001	Kanna Unnai Thedukiren		
2003	Nilavil Kalangamillai		
2003	IPC 215	Muthu	
2005	Gomathi Nayagam	Gomathi Nayagam	Also director
2007	Paruthiveeran	Kazhuva Thevan	
2007	Nam Naadu	Elamaran	
2007	Flash	Mutashan	Malayalam film
2008	Anjathe	Keerti Vaasan	
2008	Valluvan Vasuki	Thalaivar	
2008	Muniyandi Vilangial Moonramandu	Muthumani	
2008	Silambattam	Veeraiyan	
2009	Ayan	Parthiban	
2009	Mayandi Kudumbathar	Thavasi Mayandi	
2009	Muthirai	Aadhikesavan	
2009	Peraanmai	Ganapathi Ram	
2009	Aarumaname	Rajadurai	
2009	Yogi		
2010	Porkkalam	Pasupathy	
2010	Maathi Yosi		
2010	Pulliman		Malayalam film
2011	Seedan		
2011	Singam Puli		
2011	Ponnar Shankar	Chinnamalai Gounder	
2011	Sankarankovil	Mahalingam	
2011	Vaagai Sooda Vaa	JP	Tamil Nadu State Film Award for Best Villain
2011	Raa Raa		
2012	Vilayada Vaa	Deva	
2013	Kadal	Chetty Barnabodas	
2013	Thalaivaa	Ranga	
2014	Sooran	Aarai	
2014	Sathuranga Vettai	ACP	
2014	Kaaviya Thalaivan	S. V. Bairava Sundaram	
2014	Lingaa	Deva	
2015	Yatchan	Durai	
2015	Bhooloham	Rathinam	
2016	Kadalai	Boopathy	
2017	Bogan	Rajkumar	
2017	Ayyanar Veethi	Ayyanar	
2017	Yaanum Theeyavan	Jayaprakash	
2017	Neruppu Da	Guru's father	
2017	Palli Paruvathile	Kani's father	
2018	Kadaikutty Singam	Thillainayagam	
2018	Adanga Maru	Subash's father	
2019	Sathru	Kathiresan's father	
2019	Ispade Rajavum Idhaya Raniyum	Gautham's father	
2019	NGK	Pichai Muthu "Pichai"	
2021	Sulthan	Rukmani's father	
2022	Saayam	Marudhu's father	
2024	Miss You	Ramakrishnan	
2025	Aaryan	Commissioner Sabarinathan	
2025	Saaraa	Vetrivel	
2026	Con City	Aishu's father	

=== As director ===
Year	Movie	Notes
1992	Annai Vayal	
2003	Nadhi Karaiyinile	Best Film Portraying Woman in Good Light
2005	Gomathi Nayagam	

== Television ==
Year	Series	Role	Channel
1997–1998	Marmadesam - Vidathu Karuppu	Bramhan	Sun TV
1998–2000	Mangai		Sun TV
2000	Micro Thodargal-Kaathirukka Oruthi		Raj TV
2001	Marmadesam - Edhuvum Nadakkum	Sadasivam	Raj TV
2002–2003	Agal Vilakkugal	Bramhan	Sun TV
2002–2005	Annamalai	Gomathi Nayagam	Sun TV
2002–2003	Penn		Sun TV
2003–2004	Kolangal	Rajaram	Sun TV
2020	Chithi 2	Shanmugapriyan	Sun TV
2024–2025	Uppu Puli Kaaram	Subramani / Kasinathan "Kasi"	Hotstar
2024	Siragadikka Aasai	Subramani/Kasinathan "Kasi"	Star Vijay
2025	Getti Melam	Sivaraman	Zee Tamil
