= Aandan Adimai =

2001 film by Manivannan

- VCD cover
- Directed by: Manivannan
- Written by: Manivannan
- Produced by: K. Dhadhakhan
- Starring: Sathyaraj; Suvaluxmi; Divyaa Unni
- Cinematography: D. Shankar
- Edited by: P. Venkateswara Rao
- Music by: Ilaiyaraaja
- Production company: KDK International films
- Release date: 14 November 2001
- Country: India
- Language: Tamil

Aandan Adimai is a 2001 Indian Tamil-language drama film, directed by Manivannan, starring Sathyaraj, Suvaluxmi and Divyaa Unni. It was released on 14 November 2001.

== Cast ==
- Sathyaraj as Sivaraman / Sankaran
- Suvaluxmi as Maheswari
- Divyaa Unni as Gayathri
- Ranjith as Ranjith
- Manivannan as Susan
- Thalaivasal Vijay
- Vagai Chandrasekhar
- Nizhalgal Ravi as Veerasaamy
- Raj Kapoor
- Junior Balaiah
- Periya Karuppu Thevar
- Halwa Vasu
- Bonda Mani
- Mayilsamy
- Kalairani
- Shanti Williams
- Kamala Kamesh
- Krithika as Sivaraman's adopted sister (debut)

== Production ==
In the late 1990s, Manivannan attempted to make a film starring Sathyaraj, Prabhu and Livingston together titled Makkal Nanban. The film failed to take off, and he moved on to make Aandan Adimai.

== Soundtrack ==
Soundtrack was composed by Ilaiyaraaja.

Song	Singers	Lyrics
"Anne Anne"	Shankar Mahadevan	Muthulingam
"Enna Enna Paada"	Bhavatharini, Harini	Thamarai
"Undhan Rajyathil"	Ilaiyaraaja	Mu. Metha
"Nammava"	Madhu Balakrishnan, Shanmugasundari	Vaali
"Thillu Mullu"	Madhu Balakrishnan, Pushpavanam Kuppusamy	Pulamaipithan

== Reception ==
The film was released on 14 November 2001. Malathi Rangarajan of The Hindu wrote "Aandaan Adimai means well and if the incidents brought in had been presented with force the film may have made an impact." Malini Mannath of Chennai Online wrote "Though one should commend the director for making a sincere attempt to tackle a controversial problem, one wishes the script was better crafted and the scenes had more depth". Visual Dasan of Kalki praised for handling the subject without any campaigning tone, Ilayaraja's music, Shankar's cinematography but panned the editing.
