= Divya Padmini =

Indian actress

- Born: Kattappana, Idukki, Kerala, India
- Other name: Divya Vishwanath
- Citizenship: Indian
- Occupation: Actress
- Years active: 2006-2018,2022
- Spouse: Ratheesh Balakrishnan Poduval
- Children: Varadhakshina

Divya Vishwanath, also known as Divya Padmini, is an actress in Malayalam and Tamil television series. She made her television debut on Manapporuttam serial alongside Prem Prakash.

== Career ==
While Padmini was studying at NSS College, Changanacherry, she was selected by her teachers to play the central character in a telefilm titled Anakha, which was to be produced by the college's newly formed theatre club. The telefilm was aired in Asianet on Valentine's Day in 2006. Director Biju Varkey, who has made films like Phantom, noticed her and invited her to act in a non-commercial film titled Chandranilekkulla Vazhi. She acted as a village girl from a pulluvan background in the film. She was also part of the Malayalam film Indrajith.

Padmini was spotted by director P. Vasu and got her Tamil film debut in the 2011 film Puli Vesham, for which she was asked to change her name to Divya Padmini, adding her mother's maiden name to her name. Since then she was seen in few more Tamil films, like the Ilaiyaraaja musical Ayyan and Vilayada Vaa a film that focussed on carrom.

In 2007, she acted in her first serial Manapporutham. She was also part of a few other serials like Ammathottil and Sthreedhanam. She also acted in Tamil serials. She made her Tamil debut in Sun TV's serial Pillai Nila and she also acted in Kayitham, in which she plays a school teacher called Parvathy, produced by Samuthirakani.

== Personal life ==
Padmini is from Kattappana in Idukki district. She is married to Ratish, an art director, and has settled in Mumbai.

== Filmography ==
Year	Film	Role	Language
2006	Chandranilekkoru Vazhi	Indira	Malayalam
2007	Indrajith	Lakshmi	Malayalam
2011	Puli Vesham	Thamarai	Tamil
2011	Ayyan	Selvi	Tamil
2011	Kasethan Kadavulada	Mamtha	Tamil
2012	Vilayada Vaa	Divya	Tamil
2012	Husbands in Goa	Rita	Malayalam
2015	Rock Star	Vani	Malayalam

== Television ==
year	Serial	Channel	Language	Role	Notes
2006	Anakha		Malayalam	Anakha	Telefilm
2007	Manaporutham	Surya TV	Malayalam		Television Debut
2008	Velankanni Mathavu	Surya TV	Malayalam	Reachal	
2008-2009	Ammathottil	Asianet	Malayalam	Seemanthini	
2009	Sthree Manassu	Surya TV	Malayalam		
2010	Mattoruval	Surya TV	Malayalam	Deepa	
2010	Indhraneelam	Surya TV	Malayalam	Amrutha	
2012-2014	Pillai Nila	Sun TV	Tamil	Hema	Debut Tamil series
2012-2016	Sthreedhanam	Asianet	Malayalam	Divya Prashant MLA	
2013-2014	Kayitham	Puthuyugam TV	Tamil	Parvathy	
2015	Manassariyathe	Surya TV	Malayalam		Cameo
2016-2017	Chandralekha	Sun TV	Tamil	Mangaiyakarasi Siddarth	
2016	Mizhirandilum	Surya TV	Malayalam	Meera	
2017	Maamattikutti	Flowers TV	Malayalam	Sandra	
2018- 2019	Gouri	Surya TV	Malayalam	Gouri	Replaced Navami
2018	Police	ACV	Malayalam	Ganga	
2022	Kannathil Muthamittal	Zee Tamil	Tamil	Subathra	

== Awards ==
Year	Ceremony	Category	Serial	Role	Result
2012	Sun Kudumbam Awards	Best Jodi	Pillai Nila	Hema	Nominated
2013	Asianet Television Awards	Most Popular Actress	Sthreedhanam	Divya	Nominated
2013	Asianet Television Awards	Best Actress	Sthreedhanam	Divya	Won
2013	Asianet Television Awards	Best New Face	Sthreedhanam	Divya	Nominated
2014	Asianet Television Awards	Most Popular Actress	Sthreedhanam	Divya	Won
2014	Asianet Television Awards	Best Actress	Sthreedhanam	Divya	Nominated
2015	Asianet Television Awards	Best Pair	Sthreedhanam	Divya	Won
2015	Asianet Television Awards	Best Actress	Sthreedhanam	Divya	Nominated
