= Puli Vesham =

- Theatrical release poster
- Directed by: P. Vasu
- Written by: P. Vasu
- Based on: Muniya (2009) by Nagachandra
- Produced by: C. T. Vivekananth; V. Prabhu
- Starring: R. K. Karthik; Sadha; Divya Padmini
- Cinematography: Karunanithi
- Edited by: Don Max
- Music by: Srikanth Deva
- Production company: AARKEY Worlds
- Release date: 26 August 2011
- Running time: 137 minutes
- Country: India
- Language: Tamil

Puli Vesham (transl. Tiger disguise) is a 2011 Indian Tamil-language action film written and directed by P. Vasu, starring R. K., Karthik, Sadha and newcomer Divya Vishwanath. Puli Vesham released on 26 August 2011 to negative reviews. The film was a remake of Kannada film Muniya (2009). (Note: The film credits the original story to Nagachandra, the director and story writer of Muniya.)

== Plot ==
Munian (R. K.) is the innocent-turned-underworld dada. The naive youngster from a remote village becomes a dreaded dada who could fix anyone and anything for money. He spends the money to treat a girl who is in coma for six months. Who is that girl and why does he spend money for her?

The girl, Thamarai (Divya Padmini), is the daughter of a rich man (Ilavarasu) in Muniyan's native place. The rich man gives shelter to Muniyan at his earlier age after the death of his parents. Munian is given the responsibility of taking care of Thamarai. He takes the job very seriously and gets trained in martial arts just to protect her in any circumstance. A unique bond develops between them. Though it is not love, everyone suspects it to be love, and hence Munian is sent out of the village to save the girl. However, the girl doesn't want to get parted with him. She secretly follows him, and both of them get into an unexpected trouble in Chennai.

The turn of events puts the girl in a hospital and makes Munian a gangster. Munian however, has some values and hence becomes an associate to an honest ACP P. Easwara Moorthy (Karthik), who wants to eliminate the rowdies with Munian's help. The officer sends Ashwini (Sadha) in the disguise of an orphan to Munian's gang just to keep him under check.

Munian gets entangled with too many things before he could save his master's daughter. There are many players operating at different levels including the cricket crazy Govindan (Mansoor Ali Khan), who is involved in supplying girls to the rich, and Senthil (M. S. Bhaskar), a dreaded gangster. How he tackles everyone and achieves his goal forms the crux of the story.

== Cast ==
- R. K. as Munian
- Karthik as ACP P. Eswara Moorthy
- Sadha as Inspector Ashwini
- Divya Padmini as Thamarai
- Mansoor Ali Khan as Govindan
- M. S. Bhaskar as Senthil
- Ganja Karuppu as Karuppu
- Ashish Vidyarthi as Ganesa Pandian, Police Commissioner
- Ilavarasu as Thamarai's father
- Manobala as Govindan's Sidekick
- Mayilsamy
- Lollu Sabha Jeeva
- O. A. K. Sundar as Palpandi
- Cool Suresh as Govindan's Henchman
- Pandu as Govindan's Sidekick
- Muthukaalai
- Kavithalaya Krishnan
- Karai Subbayya
- Meghna Naidu in a special appearance
- Sridhar in a special appearance ("Top Class")

== Production ==
In 2010, P. Vasu announced that he would work with R. K. in a new project called Puli Vesham produced by R. K. himself. Sadha was selected as heroine which marked her comeback in Tamil cinema. Veteran actor Karthik was selected to play a police officer.

== Soundtrack ==
Music composed by Shrikanth Deva. The list of songs.

No.	Title	Lyrics	Artist(s)	Length
1.	"Chennai Gana"	Viveka	Vijaya T. Rajendar	03:33
2.	"Boy Friend"	Na. Muthukumar	Sadhana Sargam	04:49
3.	"Varaen Varaen"	Na. Muthukumar	Udit Narayan, Madhushree	05:34
4.	"Thiruda Thiruda"	Kalaikumar	Vinitha, Hariharan	04:36
5.	"Top Class"	Annamalai	Surmukhi Raman, Srikanth Deva, M. L. R. Karthikeyan, Anitha Karthikeyan	04:25
6.	"Chennai Remix"	Viveka	Vijaya T. Rajendar	04:27

== Release ==
The film was released on 26 August 2011 alongside Yuvan Yuvathi.
