= Vilayada Vaa =

2012 Indian film by Vijay Nantha

- Directed by: Vijay Nantha
- Written by: Kamalesh Kumar
- Screenplay by: Vijay Nantha
- Produced by: K. Thripurasundari
- Starring: Viswanath Balaji; Divya Padmini
- Cinematography: K. S. Ramakrishna
- Edited by: Anil Malnat
- Music by: Srimurali
- Production company: Tripura Sundhari Cine Creations
- Release date: 10 February 2012
- Country: India
- Language: Tamil

Vilayada Vaa (transl. Come and play) is a 2012 Indian Tamil-language sports drama film directed by Vijay Nantha. The film stars Viswanath Balaji and Divya Padmini. This film marks the Tamil debut of the director and music director, Srimurali.

== Plot ==
Deva is a low class man who enjoys carrom and plays with his friends. He adopts Naveen, who becomes an expert at the game. The story revolves around Naveen's struggles toward success in the world of carrom.

== Cast ==
- Viswanath Balaji as Naveen
- Divya Padmini as Divya
- Ponvannan as Deva
- Lakshmy Ramakrishnan as Devi
- Livingston as Jyothi
- Charle as Doctor
- Mayilsamy as Johnny
- Aishwarya as Anu
- Manobala as Kothandam
- Meera Krishnan as Divya's mother
- A. C. Murali Mohan as Divya's father
- Kottachi
- Ambani Shankar as Guna
- Kovai Senthil

== Production ==
Vijay Nantha, who previously directed a film in Telugu, began working on his second film. The producer, K. Tripura Sundhari, called Vijay Natha on producing a film and the former recalls how coincidentally his son, Viswanath Balaji, was chosen to portray the lead role. Balaji is a television actor and makes his film debut through Vilayada Vaa. Divya Padmini and Aishwarya Rajesh also star in the film. The director wanted to shed light on the game of carrom through this film.

== Themes ==
The director, Vijayanand, stated that "The carrom board is used as a metaphor for life in the film that is about the hero's fight to be a successful player".

== Soundtrack ==
The songs were composed by Srimurali, who previously worked in Kannada, Malayalam, and Telugu films. The audio was released by K. S. Ravikumar in 11 November 2011.

Song title	Lyricist	Singers
"Lali Lali Kadhali"	Kabilan	Karthik, Ujaini
"Vanthenda Vettriku Veeranai"	Kabilan	Mukesh Mohamed
"Engu Selveno"	Shanmugaseelan	Haricharan
"Thottadhu Thottadhu Vettriyagum"	Ugabharathi	Ranjith, Suchitra, Rap Biggnickk (rap)
"Vanam Enthan"	Na. Muthukumar	Surmukhi Raman

== Reception ==
A critic from Dinamalar praised the film's screenplay. Maalai Malar praised the carrom scenes and the songs.
