= Rasikkum Seemane =

- Poster
- Directed by: R. K. Vidhyadaran
- Produced by: Thirumalai
- Starring: Srikanth; Navya Nair; Aravind Akash
- Cinematography: M. V. Panneerselvam
- Edited by: Suresh M. Koti
- Music by: Vijay Antony
- Production company: Trans India
- Release date: 12 February 2010
- Country: India
- Language: Tamil

Rasikkum Seemane is a 2010 Indian Tamil-language thriller film written and directed by R. K. Vidhyadaran. Produced by Thirumalai though the Trans India banner, the film stars Srikanth, Navya Nair and Aravind Akash. The music was composed by Vijay Antony with cinematography by M. V. Panneerselvam and editing by Suresh M. Kothi. The film was released on 12 February 2010, after two years of being stalled.

== Plot ==
The film starts with two 10-year-old boys, Nandhu and Aravind, arguing heatedly about Gayathri and who loves her the most. As the young girl herself remarks, they are all only in seventh standard, and claims she will only fall in love with whoever happens to become a doctor. In the meantime, Gayathri's father is transferred elsewhere, while Nandhu's father commits suicide after killing his mother. Nandhu is taken care of his father's closest friend and as he cannot afford to help the kid become a doctor, he hatches a plan to become a professional blackmailer.

12 years later, Nandhu is a student and professional blackmailer, now operating under the aegis of his guru and his associate. Until Gayathri re-emerges, but for Nandhu's distraught, she has already met Aravind, who actually has become a doctor. Realisation comes to Nandhu slowly, but when all his plans to stop them falling in love backfire, he decides to take some drastic action, blackmailing her into eloping with him, but it never occurs to him to marry her.

== Cast ==
- Srikanth as Nandhu
- Navya Nair as Gayathri
- Aravind Akash as Aravind
- Sathyan as Nandhu's associate
- Bose Venkat
- Kadhal Dhandapani as Dhandapani
- Baboos as Vetri
- Dhamu as Police officer
- Vennira Aadai Moorthy
- Mayilsamy as Astrologer
- Vasu Vikram as Police Inspector
- Pandu as President
- Poovilangu Mohan as Nandhu's father
- Balu Anand as Secretary
- Sathyajith as Gayathri's father
- Vaheeda (item number in "Oh Rasikkum Seemane")
- Neelima Rani as Gayathri's friend
- Leema Babu as younger Gayathri
- R. K. Vidhyadaran as Guru

Uncredited

- Chaams as Gayathri's prospective groom
- Swaminathan
- Sampath Ram
- Muthalvan Saran (special appearance in the song "Nachilo Nachilo")

== Production ==
The film was initially titled Ettappan, but was changed after it elicited opposition, especially from descendants of Ettappan. Navya Nair, previously known for playing "girl-next-door" roles, attempted to break that mould by portraying a glamorous character. Leema Babu made her debut in the film, portraying the younger version of Nair's character. Production was completed in 2008.

== Soundtrack ==
The soundtrack was composed by Vijay Antony. The title track is a remix of the similarly named song from Parasakthi (1952). The audio was launched in August 2008. Karthik of Milliblog wrote, "Vijay Antony is definitely capable of better stuff, but in Rasikkum Seemaane’s soundtrack, his music is plain atrocious!".

Track listing
No.	Title	Lyrics	Singer(s)	Length
1.	"Oh Rasikkum Seemane"	Annamalai	Vinaya, MK Balaji
2.	"Naan Unnai Parkkum Neram"	Priyan	Vijay Antony, Maya
3.	"Kodi Kodi Minnalgal"	Priyan	Archith
4.	"Nachilo Nachilo"	Annamalai	Bakshi
5.	"Poove Poove Sollidu"	Andal Priyadarshini	Vijay Antony
6.	"Kodi Kodi Minnalgal" (2)	Priyan	Prasanna

== Release and reception ==
Rasikkum Seemane was released on 12 February 2010. Pavithra Srinivasan of Rediff.com said the film "lacks substance" with "pot-holes the size of craters, uninspired acting and dull music", the film falls "after the first half-hour". In regard to the performances, the review claims that Nair and Arvind Akash try "valiantly to act despite clichéd dialogues, weird situations and commercial twists" whilst Srikanth tries "very hard, but looks constipated". The review also criticises the director claiming that the script had "potential" but "every intriguing plot-twist turns into a damp squib".
