= Kanna Unnai Thedukiren =

2001 film by Jeeva Selvaraj

- Directed by: Jeeva Selvaraj
- Starring: Sathyan; Suvalakshmi; Anju Aravind
- Music by: Ilaiyaraaja
- Release date: 3 August 2001
- Country: India
- Language: Tamil

Kanna Unnai Thedukiren is a 2001 Indian Tamil-language drama film, written and directed by Jeeva Selvaraj. The film stars Sathyan, Suvalakshmi and Anju Aravind with music by Ilaiyaraaja. The film opened to mixed reviews in August 2001, after several delays. It is a remake of the 1996 Malayalam film Ee Puzhayum Kadannu. The film's title is based on a song from Unakkaagave Vaazhgiren (1986).

== Cast ==
- Sathyan as Prakash
- Suvalakshmi as Anjali
- Anju Aravind
- Ranjith
- Ponvannan
- Vivek
- S. N. Lakshmi
- Mahendran

== Production ==
The film began production in August 1999 and was revealed to be a remake of the 1996 Malayalam film, Ee Puzhayum Kadannu. The film was briefly retitled as Kannan Varum Neram before the makers reverted to the original title.

== Soundtrack ==
The film's soundtrack was composed by Ilaiyaraaja and released as an album during May 2000. Indiainfo wrote "Illayaraja seems to have composed this album with a laid back attitude for most of the numbers in this five-number album remind you of his earlier numbers".

No.	Song	Singers	Lyrics
1	"Koil Mani Kettanae"	Swarnalatha, P. Unnikrishnan	Mu. Metha
2	"Konjum Kuyil Pattu"	Anuradha Sriram, Harini	Pulamaipithan
3	"Oor Urangum Nerathil"	Hariharan	Palani Bharathi
4	"Oor Urangum Nerathil"	Ilaiyaraaja	Palani Bharathi
5	"Rasathi Rasathi"	Anuradha Sriram, Harini, Arunmozhi	Pulamaipithan
6	"Vanji Kodi"	Hariharan, Bhavatharini	Palani Bharathi

== Release ==
The film released in August 2001 to mixed reviews, with a critic noting "the film might have turned into a success provided it has had a good screenplay, but the "film lacks in speed" and "Sathyan, young as he is, is unable to carry the whole film on his shoulders". Another critic noted "The story line is different from the regular masala Tamil Movies and it had the potential to become a good family movie with a serious story. Instead, it appears to be a movie version of a mediocre, melodramatic T.V. play ! The main reason is poor casting & direction. The last 2 reels of the movie are very cinematic and the director Jeeva Selvaraj could have come up with a better climax". The film did not perform well at the box office and became Sathyan's final film as a lead actor. He subsequently chose to feature in films as a comedian.
