= Vengal Rao =

Indian comedian and actor

- Born: 30 January 1948 (age 78)
- Occupation: Actor
- Years active: 1989-present

Vengal Rao is an Indian Tamil actor and comedian who predominantly featured in comedy roles. For the major part of his acting career, he shared screenspace with fellow veteran comedian actor Vadivelu in many film comedy sequences.

== Career ==
He initially eventually began his career as a stuntman and he also went onto perform stunt double and dupe sequences for prominent actors Amitabh Bachchan, Rajinikanth, Vijayakanth. Some of his notable works as a stunt master came in Rajadhi Raja (1989), Mappillai (1989), Panakkaran (1990) and Captain Prabhakaran (1991). However, injuries at shooting sets and location shooting spots frequently derailed his career as a stuntman and hence he decided to focus on acting. He sustained critical injuries on his knees and shoulders as a stuntman during fight sequences in film shooting. He had worked as a stunt master for nearly 25 years in his career and also worked alongside veteran action stunt choreographer Vikram Dharma during his preliminary years.

He received minor roles such as henchman, sidekick in his early stages of acting career where he only appears in a single shot sequences which are often less than a minute. He and other side comedians such as Bonda Mani, Muthukaalai, Siva Narayana Murthy, Singamuthu, Crane Manohar and Mayilsamy received more attention and popularity from general audience when they regularly combined with Vadivelu in comedy tracks. During his film acting career, he has frequently collaborated with senior actor Vadivelu in comedy track sequences and gained fanfare for his screen presence with Vadivelu, although his roles in majority of the film have been limited to a bare minimum as he predominantly appears in film sequences whenever Vadivelu makes his appearance in the film sequences.

He received an opportunity to act in Naai Sekar Returns soon after his initial recovery from liver and stomach issues which he confronted during June 2022. He alongside other side character artists and comedian actors only made sporadic appearances in films ever since Vadivelu lost film acting opportunities as the latter was banned due to lack of work ethic and other controversies.

== Filmography ==
Uncredited roles

- Mappillai (1989)
- Rishi (2001)
- Kadhal Azhivathillai (2002)
- Thalainagaram (2006)

Credited roles

- Uzhiyan (1994)
- Honest Raj (1994)
- Kattumarakaran (1995)
- Kandha Kadamba Kathir Vela (2000)
- Azhagana Naatkal (2001)
- Panchatanthiram (2002)
- Gambeeram (2004)
- Aai (2004)
- Kadhale Jayam (2004)
- Englishkaran (2005)
- February 14 (2005)
- Kaatrullavarai (2005)
- ABCD (2005)
- Kurukshetram (2006)
- Aarya (2007)
- Piragu (2007)
- Cheena Thaana 001 (2007)
- Ennai Paar Yogam Varum (2007)
- Seval (2008)
- Ellam Avan Seyal (2008)
- Kee Mu (2008)
- Nadigai (2008) (uncredited)
- Kanthaswamy (2009)
- Madhavi (2009)
- Malai Malai (2009)
- Adada Enna Azhagu (2009)
- Nagaram Marupakkam (2010)
- Sura (2010)
- Mambattiyan (2011)
- Sagakkal (2011)
- Ilaignan (2011)
- Medhai (2012)
- Kai (2012)
- Marupadiyum Oru Kadhal (2012)
- Akilan (2012)
- Mayil Paarai (2013)
- Keeripulla (2013)
- Velmurugan Borewells (2014)
- Ennamo Nadakkudhu (2014)
- Vethu Vettu (2015)
- Eli (2015)
- Maanga (2015)
- Velainu Vandhutta Vellaikaaran (2016)
- Pandiyoda Galatta Thaangala (2016)
- Pagiri (2016)
- Sowkarpettai (2016)
- Jithan 2 (2016)
- Julieum 4 Perum (2017)
- Avalukkenna Azhagiya Mugam (2018)
- Pottu (2019)
- Thavam (2019)
- Naai Sekar Returns (2022)
- Indha Crime Thappilla (2023)

== Personal life ==
Vengal Rao had been complaining about age-related ailments and deteriorating of his physical health in his latter part of his life as of 2024. Rao insisted that his one hand and one leg have been paralyzed. In June 2022, he was detected and diagnosed with liver transplant related issues and stomach pain and was admitted to a government hospital in Vijayawada.

He had sought financial assistance from other film actors in the film industry to obtain sufficient funds in order to undergo surgeries and medical treatment.
