= Pancharaaksharam =

2019 Indian supernatural thriller film

- Theatrical release poster
- Directed by: Balaji Vairamuthu
- Written by: Balaji Vairamuthu
- Produced by: Vairamuthu
- Starring: Santhosh Prathap; Gokul Anand; Ashwin Jerome; Madhu Shalini; Sana Althaf
- Cinematography: Yuva
- Edited by: Anand Geraldin
- Music by: K. S. Sundaramurthy
- Production company: Paradox Productions
- Release date: 27 December 2019
- Running time: 122 minutes
- Country: India
- Language: Tamil

Pancharaaksharam (transl. Five Letters) is a 2019 Indian Tamil-language supernatural thriller film written and directed by Balaji Vairamuthu in his directorial debut. The film stars Santhosh Prathap, Gokul Anand, Ashwin Jerome, Madhu Shalini and Sana Althaf. The film was produced by Vairamuthu under the production banner Paradox Productions. The film is branded as India's first psychological supernatural adventure thriller film.

== Plot ==
Pancharaaksharam opens with an animated prelude set in the 11th century Chola period. A saint who is well versed in many languages writes a book called Pancharaaksharam. The book is a combination of many books in different languages and the experiences of the saint himself. It travels from person to person and eventually goes to a king who seems interested in the predictions in the book and follows them closely. The last time the king reads the book, it says that he will be killed in a war and the predictions come true. His kingdom falls and the book is said to be an accursed book that predicts the reader's future and is kept hidden and is eventually lost from history.

The story moves to the present day. Five random strangers - Dishyanth, Sameera, Dharma, Jeevika and Aidhan, all from different walks of life, meet at a concert. They become friends immediately and they go on a trip together. On their trip, Sameera suggests a game using a book in the library, which turns out to be the cursed book from many centuries earlier. Each of them takes their turns reading out a prediction for themselves in the form of riddles, and are skeptical about it and brushes it off as a joke initially. But the predictions mentioned for each of them happen in reality - Sameera faces a terrifying supernatural occurrence in her house, Dishyanth who is a traveller, gets attacked by dacoits on his travel, Aidhan is seriously injured by electrocution from his guitar, Dharma has an accident during a professional car race. Jeevika, who is a do-gooder by nature, faces a serial killer who kidnaps and tortures her and shows her the dark and twisted realities of the dark web. Everyone except Jeevika recovers from their respective mishaps, but they fail to locate Jeevika who is kept at an undisclosed location. The friends follow certain clues they remember reading in the book and try to figure it out. After a lot of twists and turns, the clues finally lead them to the area where Jeevika is held hostage along with few other women. The friends fight the serial killer together and subdue him and manage to free Jeevika and the other women successfully. They throw the cursed book away in order to avoid future problems, just in case.

In the end, as Sameera peacefully relaxes thinking about the harrowing experiences they faced recently, she comes across a blue bird and remembers a forgotten piece of the riddle she had read earlier in the book. It says that she will see a blue bird following which an impending doom and a horrible disaster will strike again. The movie ends as she looks in horror.

== Cast ==
- Santhosh Prathap as Dishyanth
- Gokul Anand as Aidhan
- Ashwin Jerome as Dharma
- Madhu Shalini as Sameera
- Sana Althaf as Jeevika
- Harini as Harini, Aidhan's Girlfriend
- Seemon Abbas as the Psychotic Serial Killer
- L. Raja as Dharma's father
- Jeeva Ravi as Jeevika's father
- Dhaswanth as the Satanic Child
- Gunasekaran
- Ranjan

== Soundtrack ==
The music for the film was scored by K. S. Sundaramurthy. The first single of the film "Theerathae", which was sung by Sid Sriram was released on 23 December 2018 and received positive reviews from the audience.

- "Theerathe" - Sid Sriram
- "Destiny" - Rajan Chellaiah, Cliffy
- "Iravukkum" - Vijay Yesudas, Arunraja Kamaraj

== Release and reception ==
Panchaksharam was released on 27 Dec 2019 alongside five other films. Santhosh Prathap, lead actor of this film had another release Naan Avalai Sandhitha Pothu on the same day.

The Indian Express wrote "If only the blemishes had been ironed out, the screenplay had been tighter, and the film's focus had been narrower, Pancharaaksharam would have turned out to be a terrific end to a relatively unsurprising year in Tamil cinema." The Times of India wrote "Pancharaaksharam is the kind of film that surprises by simply by being an engaging watch. Director Balaji Vairamuthu sets up the story with quick character introductions and gets into the plot."
