= Climax (2013 film) =

2013 film by Anil Kumar

- Theatrical release poster
- Directed by: Anil
- Written by: Kaloor Dennis
- Produced by: P J Thomas
- Starring: Sana Khan; Suresh Krishna; Subin Sunny
- Music by: Berny-Ignatius
- Release date: 24 May 2013
- Running time: 125 minutes
- Country: India
- Language: Malayalam

Climax is 2013 Indian Malayalam biographical film directed by Anil and featuring Sana Khan in the lead role. Climax depicts the life of the actress Silk Smitha. The film was dubbed into Tamil titled Oru Nadigayin Diary and released on 24 May 2013 and into Telugu under the name Gajjala Gurram. The disclaimer in the beginning states that the characters are imaginary.

== Premise ==
Supriya is a starlet, meets R. K., who wins her heart and later becomes her mentor, while R. K.'s son Rahul is infatuated with Supriya.

== Cast ==
- Sana Khan as Poonkodi/Supriya
- Suresh Krishna as Ramkumar (R. K.)
- Subin Sunny as Rahul
- Shanthi Williams as Supriya's mother
- Lakshmi Sharma as Aparna
- Bijukuttan as Kumaresan
- K. Madhu as Director
- Irshad as Victor Lenus
- Manoj Nair as Hotel Manager
- Aravind Akash
- Ashwanth Thilak

== Soundtrack ==
The music was composed by Berny-Ignatius.

Climax

Soundtrack album by Berny-Ignatius
- Released: Mar 1, 2013
- Recorded: 2013
- Genre: Soundtrack
- Length: 16:35
- Language: Malayalam
- Label: Saregama
- Producer: Berny-Ignatius

Track list
No.	Title	Lyrics	Singer(s)	Length
1.	"Vinnin Kanlindiye"	Vayalar Sarath Chandra Varma	Elizabeth Raju, Madhu Balakrishnan	4:42
2.	"Thamarapookai Kalal"	Santhosh Varma	Afsal, Sithara	3:45
3.	"Mayangan Kazhiyilla Oru Shalabathiinum"	Santhosh Varma	Shubin Ignatius	4:05
4.	"Mayangan Kazhiyilla Oru Shalabathiinum - Female"	Santhosh Varma	Delcy Ninan	4:03
Total length:				16:35

Tamil Track list
No.	Title	Lyrics	Singer(s)	Length
1.	"Adanga Mogatheeyil"	Aadhi Ram	Kaushik Menon	3:43
2.	"Tamara Poongaikalal"	Aadhi Ram	Sooraj Santhosh, Sameera Bharadwaj	3:45
3.	"Vinnil Aalinganam"	Aadhi Ram	Suchith Suresan, Cicily	4:18
Total length:				11:46

Telugu Track list
No.	Title	Lyrics	Length
1.	"Venne Chinne Idi"	Vennelakanti
2.	"Tamara Poorekula"	Vennelakanti
3.	"Nidure Karuvaina"	Vennelakanti

== Reception ==
The film opened to negative reviews. Paresh C Palicha of Rediff.com writes "Climax is slow paced and uninteresting" and goes on to give 1/5.

== See also ==
- The Dirty Picture
- Dirty Picture: Silk Sakkath Maga
