= Ayyanar Veethi =

2017 Tamil film by Gipsy Rajkumar

- Poster
- Directed by: Gipsy Rajkumar
- Produced by: P. Senthilvel; Vijayasankar
- Starring: K. Bhagyaraj; Ponvannan; Yuvan; Sara Setty; Sinju Mohan
- Cinematography: Sakthivel
- Edited by: Suresh Urs
- Music by: U. K. Murali
- Production company: Sri Sai Shanmugar Pictures
- Release date: 28 April 2017
- Country: India
- Language: Tamil

Ayyanar Veethi (transl. Ayyanar Street) is a 2017 Tamil-language drama film directed by debutant Gipsy Rajkumar in his directorial debut. The film stars K. Bhagyaraj, Ponvannan in the titular role, Yuvan, Sinju Mohan and newcomer Sara Setty in the lead roles.

== Cast ==
- K. Bhagyaraj as Subramania Sastry
- Ponvannan as Ayyanar
- Yuvan as Senthil
- Singampuli
- Sinju Mohan as Durga
- Sara Setty as Soumya
- Das Pandiyan
- P. Senthilvel
- Vijayasankar
- L. Raja
- Muthukaalai
- Stills Kumar
- Kovai Senthil as Hospital ward boy
- Vijayaraj
- Meera Krishnan
- Muthalvan Saran (uncredited)

== Production ==
The film was announced to be a rural drama with Yuvan in the lead role and Ponvannan and Bhagyaraj in pivotal roles. Singer U. K. Murali makes his debut as a film composer with this film. Newcomer Sara Setty and Sinju Mohan, of Pulipaarvai fame, play the heroines, who are the daughters of the characters portrayed by Ponvannan and Bhagyraj, respectively. The film was shot in Rajapalayam. A twenty-seven foot tall statue of Ayyanar was created for the film.

== Soundtrack ==
The soundtrack was composed by U. K. Murali.

- "Vaararu Ayyan Varaaru" - Ananthu, M. L. R. Karthikeyan
- "Ponnungale Poruthavare" - Jaya Moorthy
- "Kallapparvai" - Prasanna, Mahathy
- "Kannucharayam Munnale" - Velmurugan, Krithika Babu
- "Ayyanaaru Veedhiyile" - U. K. Murali, Gipsy Rajkumar
- "Anbukonda Ayyan Mugam" - U. K. Murali, Gipsy Rajkumar

== Reception ==
The Times of India gave the film one out of five stars and wrote that "It (The film) unfolds like a collection of the worst elements of 80s and 90s melodramas". The Times of India Samayam gave the film a rating of one-and-half out of five stars praising the cinematography and criticizing the plot holes. Dinamalar praised the music while criticizing the background score and plot gaps. Maalaimalar praised the cinematgorphy and music and criticized the background score.
