= Anuragakottaram =

1998 Indian film

- Poster
- Directed by: Vinayan
- Screenplay by: A. K. Sajan; A. K. Santhosh
- Produced by: Ramakrishnan
- Starring: Dileep; Suvalakshmi; Jagathy Sreekumar; Shiju
- Cinematography: Venugopal
- Edited by: G. Murali
- Music by: Ilaiyaraaja
- Production company: Prathyusha Films
- Distributed by: Prathyusha Films
- Release date: 3 June 1998
- Country: India
- Language: Malayalam

Anuragakottaram (transl. Romantic palace) is a 1998 Indian Malayalam-language romance comedy thriller film directed by Vinayan and written by A. K. Sajan and A. K. Santhosh. It stars Dileep, Jagathy Sreekumar, and Suvalakshmi, with Kalpana, Cochin Haneefa, and Maniyanpilla Raju in supporting roles. The film's music was composed by Ilaiyaraaja.

== Plot ==
Charles is a young man who has raised his sister since the age of eight after they were orphaned. Due to an incident at her college arts day competition, Charles' sister undergoes a mental shock. To pay for her treatment, he needs a considerable sum of money. He meets Shobharaj, a con man, and together, they are hired by Paulochan. Paulochan's daughter, Anna, recently joined a convent to become a nun. He instructs Charles to romance his daughter to make her leave the convent. He wants her to get married and continue the family blood. Charles and Shobharaj take up jobs at the canteen to accomplish the task. All goes wrong when Charles mistakenly targets the wrong Anna, also a student at the convent, who falls in love with him and leaves the convent with him.

Once he finds out his mistake, he and Shobharaj spend the rest of the movie 1) lying to the "false" Anna (whom Charles is hesitant to tell that his feelings for her were never real), 2) running away from Paulochan who is demanding his 3 lakhs back since they botched the job, 3) from the police, who believe that they kidnapped Anna, 4) thugs hired by Anna's step-brother to kill her because of her large inheritance, and 5) the Mother of the convent Anna ran away from. The five forces intersect comically and amidst all, Charles and (the false) Anna fall in love. All is resolved when Anna's step-brother falls over a ledge, and Charles and Anna are united.

== Cast ==
- Dileep as Charles Jr, a young orphan
- Suvalakshmi as Anna Sebastian, Charles's Love Interest
- Jagathy Sreekumar as Sobharaj, a thief in Kodaikanal, Charles's Friend
- Kalpana as Mother Superior Ancy
- Cochin Haneefa as Pala Paulose, Charles and Shobharaj's Friend
- Maniyanpilla Raju as Private Detective Henry, Charles, Shobharaj and Paulose's Friend
- Augustine as Kodaikanal CI Kottavasal Mahalingam
- Shiju as Bijoy Willson
- Shivaji as Willson, Bijoy's Father
- Oduvil Unnikrishnan as Fr. Abel
- Sreejaya Nair as Anna Poulose, Poulose's Daughter
- Rajan Sankaradi as Sebastian, Anna's Father
- Sathyapriya as Marykutty, Anna's Mother
- Bobby Kottarakkara as Kolliyan, Shobharaj's Assistant
- Sadiq as Albert, Bijoy's Henchman #1
- Subair as Benny, Bijoy's Henchman #2
- Kottayam Nazeer as Tony, Bijoy's Henchman #3
- Viji Thampi as Punjabi Singh
- Kamal Roy as Bijoy's Henchman #4
- Manu Varma as Doctor

== Soundtrack ==
The music was composed by Ilayaraja, and the lyrics were written by Kaithapram.

No.	Song	Singers	Lyrics	Length (m:ss)
1	"Chirichente Manassile" [D]	K. J. Yesudas, K. S. Chithra	Kaithapram	
2	"Chirichente Manassile" [M]	K. J. Yesudas	Kaithapram	
3	"Mohathin Mutheduthu"	K. S. Chithra, Biju Narayanan	Kaithapram	
4	"Ponmaanam Ee Kaikalil" [Child Version]	Biju Narayanan, Sruthi	Kaithapram	
5	"Ponmaanam Ee Kaikalil" [M]	Biju Narayanan	Kaithapram	
6	"Ponnum Thinkal Thaarattum"	K. J. Yesudas	Kaithapram	
7	"Thenchodi Poove Maanmizhi Kanave"	M. G. Sreekumar	Kaithapram	
