= Isakki (film) =

2013 Indian film by M. Ganesan

- Official poster
- Directed by: M. Ganesan
- Starring: Sharran Kumar; Aashritha
- Music by: Srikanth Deva
- Release date: 31 May 2013
- Country: India
- Language: Tamil

Isakki is a 2013 Indian Tamil-language romantic drama film directed by M. Ganesan and starring Sharran Kumar and Aashritha.

== Plot ==
A teacher from a rich family Nandhini rejects the love of a car driver Saran to avoid problems that will arise with her family as a result of falling in love with him. Saran keeps pursuing the teacher, which makes them both closer. When Nandhini's boyfriend Mari is released from jail, Saran decides to reveal his true identity as Isakki. Whether Isakki and Nandhini reunite or not forms the crux of the story.

== Cast ==
- Sharran Kumar as Isakki / Saran
- Aashritha as Nandhini
- Yogiram as Mari
- Chitra Lakshmanan as Devarajan
- Pasanga Sivakumar as Balasingham, Nandhini's father
- Lollu Sabha Jeeva as Devarajan's house's caretaker

== Production ==
The film was shot in Ooty, Madurai, Dindigul and Chennai. Sharran Kumar sports two looks in the film (a city dweller and village simpleton). For the village look, he lost a lot of kilograms and sat in the sun in Karaikudi for five days to get the tanned look.

== Soundtrack ==
The film's music is composed by Srikanth Deva. Ananthu sung a devotional song "Ayya Saami" while Shreya Ghoshal sang a romantic number.

- En Chellakutty - Shreya Ghoshal
- Ayyasamy - Ananthu
- Kandukonden - Karthik
- Ooru Usilampatti - Shankar Mahadevan, Mahalakshmi
- Vela Vadivela - M. L. R. Karthikeyan

== Release and reception ==
The film released alongside Kutti Puli (2013).

Malini Mannath of The New Indian Express opined that "Isakki doesn’t offer much to a viewer by way of novelty, excitement or entertainment". A critic from The Times of India gave the film a rating of 1 out of 5 and said that "With little to entertain the audience, the movie turns out to be a timid effort".
