= M. Thirumalai (director) =

Indian film director

- Born: 1977 (age 48–49); Tiruvallur, Tamil Nadu, India
- Occupation: Film director
- Years active: 2007–present

M. Thirumalai is an Indian film director and producer, who has directed Tamil language films. He became known for the action drama Thee Nagar (2007), and has gone on to make feature films including Agam Puram (2010) and Kasethan Kadavulada (2011).

== Career ==
M. Thirumalai was born in 1977 in Tiruvallur, Tamil Nadu. He completed a degree in Tamil literature from Nandanam Arts College, and his master's degree at Pachaiyappa's College. Upon graduation, he worked as an assistant director, notably assisting K. Subhash. Thirumalai made his directorial debut through Thee Nagar (2007), an action drama starring Karan in the lead role. His second film, Agam Puram (2010) began production at the end of January 2008 with Shaam playing the lead role and M. Gopalakrishnan financing the film. The film was titled Agam Puram due to the director's passions for literature and also due to the fact that the title means two-sided, which relates to Shaam's double sided character. Shaam eventually became the film's producer in 2010 after M. Gopalakrishnan left the film. However, Thirumalai later produced the film under his banner T. Creations and it had a delayed release in December 2010.

In February 2010, he began working on a project titled Maan Vettai starring Seeman, the son of a DMK politician. The film progressed slowly throughout the 2010s with several changes of cast, and eventually had a delayed release in March 2023. In the early 2010s, he also worked on the comedy drama Kasethan Kadavulada (2011) starring Charan and Kamna Jethmalani in the lead roles, and an unreleased project titled Malaysia Nanban, where he played the lead role. A further production venture, Emakku Thozhil Romance (2024), released after a seven year delay, with Thirumalai publicly critical of the film's lead actor for not promoting the film.

In October 2022, he started work on a new film starring Nakul, Natty and Srikanth in the lead roles.

== Personal life ==
Thirumalai married Nadhiya at a ceremony in Tirupathi in June 2008.

== Filmography ==
Year	Title	Credited as		Notes
Year	Title	Director	Producer	Notes
2007	Thee Nagar	Yes		
2010	Rasikkum Seemane		Yes	
2010	Agam Puram	Yes	Yes	
2011	Kasethan Kadavulada	Yes		
2012	Nellai Santhippu		Yes	
2023	Maan Vettai	Yes		
2024	Emakku Thozhil Romance		Yes	
