= Maanga (film) =

- Directed by: R. S. Raja
- Produced by: P. C. K. Sakthivel
- Starring: Premgi; Advaitha
- Cinematography: R. S. Selva
- Edited by: Suresh Urs
- Music by: Premgi Amaren
- Production company: Dream Zone Movies
- Release date: 11 September 2015
- Country: India
- Language: Tamil

Maanga is a 2015 Indian Tamil language science fiction comedy film directed by debutant R. S. Raja and produced by P. C. K. Sakthivel. The film features Premgi Amaren and Advaitha in the lead roles, while Leema Babu, Ilavarasu, Manobala, Srinivasan, and Rekha appear in supporting roles. The music was composed by Premgi with cinematography by R. S. Selva and editing by Suresh Urs. The film was released on 11 September 2015.

== Cast ==
- Premji as Shiva / Vishwanatha Moorthy
- Advaitha as Joshita
- Leema Babu as Alamu
- Ilavarasu as Nambirajan
- Manobala as Rengasamy Nagarajan
- Srinivasan
- Rekha as Samyuktha
- Chaams as Kalakkal
- T. P. Gajendran as Petthiah
- Thennavan
- Amarasigamani
- Vengal Rao

== Production ==
Premgi Amaren revealed it would be the first film which would feature him as the sole lead actor after previous ventures including 2010 Bhagyaraj had failed to be completed. Filming began later that month with Thambi Ramaiah and Manobala filming scenes in Chennai. Advaitha was selected to play the film's heroine while Leema Babu will also play a role.

== Soundtrack ==
Maanga

Soundtrack album by Premgi Amaren
- Released: 1 April 2015
- Recorded: 2015
- Genre: Feature film soundtrack
- Length: 21:00
- Language: Tamil
- Label: Saregama
- Producer: Premgi Amaren

Premgi Amaren chronology
Ennamo Nadakkudhu (2013)	Maanga (2015)	Achamindri (2016)

The soundtrack was composed by Premgi Amaren. The audio was released on 1 April 2015.

Track-List
No.	Title	Lyrics	Singer(s)	Length
1.	"Genius Maanga"	Snehan	Ranjith	4:24
2.	"Vedakozhi"	Snehan	Naveen Madhav, Saindhavi	4:34
3.	"Anjathey"	Acharya	Hemambika	1:39
4.	"Appankitta"	Snehan	Premgi Amaren	3:33
5.	"Kanne"	Thanjai N. Ramaiah Dass	Premgi Amaren, Hemambika	2:40
6.	"Sriranjini"	Gangai Amaran	Premgi Amaren, Ramya NSK, T. L. Maharajan, Hemambika	4:10
Total length:				21:00

== Critical reception ==
The Times of India wrote "The film feels like a hodgepodge of movie references, bad science, and lazily written jokes put together in a manner that is hardly competent".
