= Ashwin Jerome =

Indian actor

- Occupation: Actor
- Years active: 2017–2019

Ashwin Jerome is a former Indian actor who works in Tamil-language films. He is known for playing the lead role in Yaanum Theeyavan (2017).

== Career ==
Ashwin was a professional dancer and he used to run a dance school before studying engineering and working in an information technology company for sometime. He completed a master's degree in business administration and worked in a resort in Singapore. Later he joined the theatre group Koothu-P-Pattarai.

He made his acting debut in Yaanum Theeyavan (2017), which starred Varsha Bollamma and Raju Sundaram. In a review of the film, a critic from the Deccan Chronicle noted that "Debutant Ashwin Jerome has the right looks of a hero and he is good at action sequences as well".

He played one of the five leads in the thriller Pancharaaksharam, but the film ended up releasing after Natpe Thunai (2019). He was approached for the role by Hiphop Tamizha Adhi and the film producers Khushbu and Sundar C.

== Personal life ==
His father, Jerome Pushparaj, is a music composer. He married Olivette Nivedha in 2021 with Christian marriage rituals. The couple had a child Adele Natalia in 2022.

== Filmography ==
Year	Film	Role	Notes
2017	Yaanum Theeyavan	Michael (Mike)	
2018	Ondraa Irandaa Aasaigal	Dev	Short film
2018	My Valentine		Short film
2019	Natpe Thunai	Aasif	
2019	Pancharaaksharam	Dharma	
