= Kasethan Kadavulada (2011 film) =

2011 film by Thirumalai

- Directed by: Thirumalai
- Screenplay by: Thirumalai
- Story by: Devi Prasad
- Produced by: Jamal Syed Ibrahim; J. Raja Mohammed
- Starring: Sharan; Kamna Jethmalani; Karunas; Pandiarajan; Sathyan; Lollu Sabha Jeeva; Divya Padmini
- Cinematography: Sevilo Raja
- Edited by: S. Saleem
- Music by: Karunas
- Production company: Jamal Movie Creations
- Release date: 9 September 2011
- Country: India
- Language: Tamil

Kasethan Kadavulada (transl. Only money is god) is a 2011 Indian Tamil-language comedy film written and directed by Thirumalai, starring Sharan, Kamna Jethmalani, Karunas, Pandiarajan, Divya Padmini, Sathyan, Manobala, Delhi Ganesh, Paravai Muniyamma, and Singamuthu playing the main characters. The film, directed by Thirumalai, has music scored by comedian and singer Karunas. It is a remake of Telugu film Blade Babji.

== Cast ==
- Sharan as Blade Bala
- Kamna Jethmalani as Archana
- Karunas as Karuna
- Pandiarajan as Duraisingam
- Sathyan
- Lollu Sabha Jeeva as Gaja
- Divya Padmini as Mamtha
- Delhi Ganesh
- L. Raja
- Manobala as Balram Naidu
- Mayilsamy as Thangaraj
- Singamuthu as Mani
- Singampuli as Bujjibabu
- Pandu
- Nalini as Kamala
- Paravai Muniyamma
- Babilona as Savithri
- Meera Krishnan
- Fathima Babu
- Sujibala in a special appearance

== Soundtrack ==
Soundtrack was composed by Karunas.

- Panatha Kaatunga - Ananthu
- Nainavukku - Grace Karunas
- Unnai Orumurai - Prasanna, Kalyani
- Discovukku - Anthony Daasan, Grace Karunas
- Kasethan - Karunas

== Reception ==
The New Indian Express wrote that "The director has maintained an even paced narration. But it's juvenile comedy at most times, and targeted at the lowest denominator in the audience". A critic from Kungumam praised Charan and the director's efforts. On the contrary, a critic from Dinamalar criticised the film as a whole.
