= Suvaluxmi =

Indian actress

- Born: Suvalakshmi Munshi; 19 August 1977 (age 48); Kolkata, India
- Occupation: Actress
- Years active: 1994-2003
- Spouse: Swagato Banerjee (m. 2002)

Suvaluxmi is an Indian former actress who mainly appeared in Tamil films. She also appeared in Bengali, Telugu, Malayalam, Kannada films. Portraying homely characters, she is well known of her characters in Aasai (1995), Gokulathil Seethai (1996), Love Today (1997), Nilaave Vaa (1998) and Nadhi Karaiyinile (2003) which all the commercially successful films.

== Career ==
As a child, Suvaluxmi was passionate about Indian classical and folk dance forms and performed the art forms across regional shows. Her performance on stage was noticed by film director Satyajit Ray, who cast her as the female lead in the film adaptation of his story Uttoran (1994). The film, which was completed by his son Sandip Ray following Satyajit Ray's demise, won the National Film Award for Best Screenplay in 1994 and was screened in film festivals around the world, including at Cannes.

Alongside graduating with a degree of Bachelor of Laws from the University of Calcutta in 1998, Suvaluxmi acted as the female protagonist in several movies in South Indian languages. She made her debut in Tamil films with Aasai (1995), a romantic thriller film directed by Vasanth and produced by Mani Ratnam. Suvaluxmi portrayed Yamuna and paired opposite Ajith Kumar, with her character being vigorously pursued by her brother-in-law, portrayed by Prakash Raj. Upon release, the film won positive reviews and performed well at the box office, with all three lead actors getting a boost in their career. Balsekaran's Love Today (1997) opposite Vijay, also performed well commercially. Despite the success of these two films, Suvaluxmi's subsequent films failed to expand her initial popularity and she felt that the rise of glamorous roles for female actors in Tamil films, meant that she found it difficult to find apt characters to portray and was typecast as a homely girl. In the late 1990s, she appeared in several Tamil films, though her roles and the performance of her films failed to get acclaim. In 2001, she opted to quit films and pursue a career as a lawyer and finally signed up to appear in Ponvannan's critically acclaimed film Nadhi Karaiyinile (2003), for which she won positive reviews, with The Hindu noting she gave a "heartrending enactment". She was a leading actress from 1994 till 2001 and successfully completed 8 years in silver screen.

After her marriage, in 2007 she turned down an offer from Mohan Raja to portray a supporting role in Santosh Subramaniam (2008) and restated her retirement from films. Since her departure from the film industry, Suvaluxmi practices as a natural artist and graduated with a degree of Masters of fine arts in Illustration during 2013 from the Academy of Art University in San Francisco.

== Personal life ==
She married Professor Swagato Banerjee in 2002 and lived in Geneva and then in San Francisco and then in Louisville.

== Filmography ==
All films are in Tamil unless otherwise noted

Year	Film	Role	Notes
1994	Uttoran	Manashi	Bengali film
1995	Aasai	Yamuna (Saraswathi)	Cinema Express Award for Best New Face Actress; Nominated-Filmfare Award for Best Actress – Tamil
1996	Gokulathil Seethai	Nila	Nominated-Filmfare Award for Best Actress – Tamil
1996	Kalki	Herself	
1997	Kathirunda Kadhal	Indhu	
1997	Love Today	Santhiya	
1997	Kadhal Palli	Uma	
1998	Ponmanam	Maheswari	
1998	Dhinamdhorum	Booma	
1998	Santhosham	Bhavani	
1998	Kavalai Padathe Sagodhara	Philomina	
1998	Iniyavale	Meena	
1998	Anuragakottaram	Anna	Malayalam film
1998	Nilaave Vaa	Sangeetha	
1998	En Aasai Rasave	Manoranjitham	
1999	House Full	Indhu	
1999	Suyamvaram	Ezhilarasi	
1999	Ponvizha	Ponni	
1999	Nee Varuvai Ena	Dream Bride	Guest appearance
1999	Kanmani Unakkaga	Sudha	
2000	Eazhaiyin Sirippil	Thulasi	
2000	Krishna Leele	Seetha	Kannada film
2000	Maayi	Lakshmi	
2000	Kannaal Pesavaa	Poongodi	
2000	Durga	Ganga	Telugu film
2000	Pottu Amman	Ganga	
2001	Kanna Unnai Thedukiren	Anjali	
2001	Aandan Adimai	Maheswari	
2003	Vani Mahal	Selvi	
2003	Nadhi Karaiyinile	Jameela	Tamil Nadu State Film Award Special Prize

== Television ==
- 2001-2002 Soolam as goddess Parvati
