= Nadhi Karaiyinile =

- DVD cover with the international title, Jameela
- Directed by: Ponvannan
- Screenplay by: Ponvannan
- Story by: Sara Aboobacker
- Starring: Suvalakshmi; Rajan P. Dev; Ramji
- Cinematography: K. V. Mani
- Edited by: K. Palanivel
- Music by: Sirpy
- Production company: National Film Development Corporation of India
- Distributed by: Viswas Cinema
- Release date: 28 November 2003
- Running time: 104 minutes
- Country: India
- Language: Tamil

Nadhi Karaiyinile (transl. On the river shore) is a 2003 Indian Tamil-language drama film, written and directed by Ponvannan. Based on the Kannada novel Chandragiriya Theeradalli by Sara Aboobacker, The film, which had an initial release at international film festivals with the title Jameela, stars Suvalakshmi, Rajan P. Dev and Ramji. The music for the film was composed by Sirpy and the film opened to positive reviews in November 2003, after several delays.

== Cast ==
- Suvalakshmi as Jameela
- Rajan P. Dev as Mohammed Khan
- Ramji as Nazeer
- Cochin Haneefa
- Ajay Rathnam
- Shanti Williams
- R. C. Sakthi

== Production ==
Ponvannan had been impressed with writer Sara Aboobacker's novel and bought the script rights, before submitting his screenplay to National Film Development Corporation of India to finance the film, titled Jameela. The agency agreed and Jameela was shot for 17 days in Pondicherry at a shoestring budget of ₹35 lakh (worth ₹2.4 crore in 2021 prices).

== Release ==
The film won positive reviews in screenings and was well received by critics, prompting it to be selected to be shown in the non-competitive category at the 2002 Shanghai International Film Festival. Despite being censored in 2001, the film only had a theatrical release across India in November 2003 under the title Nadhi Karayinile, after the distributor Viswas Sundar did not want the film to be classified as a "Muslim film". The film did not perform well at the box office, but went on to win three State film awards including the recognition as Best Film portraying Women in Good Light. The Hindu described Ponvannan's direction as an "absorbing presentation", adding "his sensitivity comes to the fore throughout the film". Visual Dasan of Kalki praised the performances of actors, K. V. Mani's cinematography and praised Ponvannan for directing the film realistically. This was Suvalakshmi's last film she had worked before she left the film industry.

== Bibliography ==
- Dhananjayan, G. (2014). Pride of Tamil Cinema: 1931–2013. Blue Ocean Publishers. OCLC 898765509.
