= Thee Nagar =

- Poster
- Directed by: Thirumalai
- Written by: Thirumalai
- Produced by: R M S Saran
- Starring: Karan; Udhayathara
- Cinematography: Suresh Devan
- Music by: Jassie Gift
- Production company: S R Studios
- Release date: 27 July 2007
- Country: India
- Language: Tamil

Thee Nagar is a 2007 Indian Tamil-language action film directed by Thirumalai. It starred Karan and Udhayathara in lead roles, while Shanmugarajan, Scissor Manohar, Kadhal Sukumar, and Meera Krishnan play supporting roles. The soundtrack was composed by Jassie Gift with cinematography by Suresh Devan. The film was released on 27 July 2007.

== Plot ==
Yamaha Murugan (Karan) is a do-gooder who commands respect from the students community for his good deeds as the students chairman in a city college. Unable to find a lucrative job, he sets up a tea shop in front of the college. From here, he passes out. Life goes smooth for Murugan until he comes across a corrupt cop FIR Murthy (Shanmugarajan). Murugan is targeted for no fault of his by Murthy. Nadhiya (Udhayathara), a girl next door, falls for Murugan's good conduct, and both develop romance. However, a bloody duel between Murugan and Murthy brings a change in the former's life. The rest is the battle between the two to assert their supremacy over one other that ends with a riveting climax.

== Cast ==
- Karan as Yamaha Murugan
- Udhayathara as Nadhiya
- Shanmugarajan as FIR Murthy
- Meera Krishnan as Murugan's mother
- Kadhal Sukumar as Krishna
- Scissor Manohar as Murthy's Henchman
- Vijai Kaartik
- Sameksha as an item number

== Soundtrack ==
The soundtrack was composed by Jassie Gift.

- "Ayiram Ayiram Koilkalai Vida" - Sherdin Thomas, Abhinav, Jose
- "Kadavul Ethukku Kadhal Irukku" - K. S. Chitra,
- "Neeye En Soma Baaname" - Jassie Gift, Reshmi,
- "Oothu Oothuda" - Naveen, Anupama, Saindhavi,
- "Potta Pulla Venumaadi" - Prasanna, Sujatha,
- "Thaliyum Vendam Veliyum Vendam" - Naveen, Sujatha

== Critical reception ==
Sify wrote "There is nothing new in story or presentation and the film sags towards the climax, and is a total let down. Thirumalai, the director has etched the plot of the film from Dharani?s action movie Dhil, added some masala, and remixed it". Chennai Online wrote "The script hops, skips and jumps through situations without much consistency. So, by the time you get tuned to one situation, the director has gone on to a totally new one. And by the time you get acquainted with this new one, you are distracted by a different track. The messages are varied, conveyed in a confused way that doesn't make any impact".
