= Margazhi 16 =

- Directed by: K. Stephen
- Written by: K. Stephen; Aruna Pachai Perumal (dialogues)
- Produced by: Flower Rajkumar
- Starring: Jayanth; Srinidhi
- Cinematography: V. Lakshmipathy
- Edited by: P. Sai Suresh
- Music by: E. K. Bobby
- Production company: Jayavishal Arts
- Release date: 18 February 2011
- Running time: 120 minutes
- Country: India
- Language: Tamil

Margazhi 16 (transl. March 16) is a 2011 Indian Tamil language romantic drama film directed by K. Stephen. The film stars newcomers Jayanth and Srinidhi, with L. Raja, Srinivas, Sevvalai Raju, Stunt Silva and Chandra playing supporting roles. It was released on 18 February 2011.

== Plot ==
In Thoothukudi, in the 1990s, Kathir is a carefree young man who spends his time drinking and hanging out with his friends. He lives with his widowed mother and sister. His neighbour Jennifer is a student in tenth grade and she lives with her parents and two sisters. At first, she hates Kathir thinking that he is a bad person when he talked to her classmate and he had a fight with the rowdy Madamurugan. Jennifer then learns that Madamurugan had molested her classmate and Kathir thrashes him in retaliation. Jennifer slowly develops a soft corner for him and they eventually fall in love with each other. During a dance function, Madamurugan misbehaves with Jennifer and Kathir has again a fight with him thus the police arrest Kathir. At the police station, the police inspector warns Kathir not to do it again and releases him. The police inspector is, in fact, Jennifer's close relative.

Kathir's mother wants him to become a responsible person so she forces Kathir to go to Chennai without delay. Kathir could not tell Jennifer about his departure and he instead decides to go to the nearer city Tirunelveli where one of his uncles lives. There, he works in a cinema theatre and often returns to his city to meet Jennifer with the bike of a cinema client. Kathir learns that Madamurugan's brother Madasamy has threatened his mother and one night, he thrashes Madasamy. Madasamy who couldn't recognize the aggressor in the dark sets out in search of him. Thereafter, Jennifer's father accepts for the marriage but under multiple conditions: his first daughter must marry, Jennifer must finish her studies and Kathir have to earn enough money to marry her. Later, Madasamy finds his aggressor Kathir and he tries to run over Kathir with his vehicle but Kathir avoids it at the last moment and but is hit by another vehicle.

Many years later, Jennifer has developed a mental illness and refuses to marry. To treat her, her parents take her to a special place for the mentally ill. There, Jennifer recognizes Kathir who is now a mentally ill person. In a state of shock, Jennifer recollects her past life and she is completely back to her normal self. Jennifer who wants to be with Kathir starts to act like a mentally ill person in front of her parents and they leave her there.

== Cast ==
- Jayanth as Kathir
- Srinidhi as Jennifer
- L. Raja as Jennifer's father
- Srinivas as Police inspector
- Sevvalai Raju as Kathir's uncle
- Stunt Silva as Madasamy
- Chandra as Kathir's mother
- Sridevi
- Devi
- Baby Lakshana
- Baby Jaya Uma
- Vinitha as Kathir's sister
- Set Govindaraj as Head constable
- K. S. Thangasamy as Kathir's uncle
- Viji Sekar as Madasamy's mistress

== Production ==
K. Stephen, an associate of A. Venkatesh, made his directorial debut with Margazhi 16 under the banner of Jayavishal Arts. Actor Bhanu Chander's son Jayanth was chosen to make his debut on the big screen while Srinidhi, who played as a child artiste in various Malayalam language films, was selected to play the heroine. Another hero was Srinivas who hailed from Chennai and L. Raja was cast to play the father role. The film was based on the real-life story of the film director Stephen's friend. E. K. Bobby, who was the music director of Sollamale (1998), Nesam Pudhusu (1999) and Palaivana Solai (2009), was selected to compose the music. Speaking of the film, K. Stephen said, "Normally Thoothukudi has also been portrayed as a place of violence. But this film shows that there some beautiful romantic stories in this kind of places also. Since I wanted this film to be realistic, I wanted to utilize the local people to act in this film. But since I could not get a proper hero and heroine from this place, I had to make use of the actor and actress from another place. But the other actors who are acting in the film are all from Thoothukudi".

== Soundtrack ==
Margazhi 16

Soundtrack album by E. K. Bobby
- Released: 2 March 2010
- Recorded: 2009
- Genre: Feature film soundtrack
- Length: 26:49
- Label: Sony Music India
- Producer: E. K. Bobby

The film score and the soundtrack were composed by E. K. Bobby. Malathy Sundaram rated the album 2 out of 5 and wrote, "There is an engaging crispness about this album which cannot be denied. We can certainly look forward to more creativity from this composer in his next album".

Tracklist
No.	Title	Lyrics	Singer(s)	Length
1.	"Konjam Veyilaga"	Francis Kiruba	Hariharan	4:41
2.	"Paadhakathee Penne I"	Priyan	Karthik	4:10
3.	"Karakkan Murakkan"	Priyan	Shankar Mahadevan, Chinmayi	4:36
4.	"Katcha Theevu"	Kalaikumar	Ranjith, Nincy Vincent	4:39
5.	"Thirunelveli"	Priyan	Benny Dayal	4:33
6.	"Paadhakathee Penne II"	Priyan	Karthik	4:10
Total length:				26:49

== Reception ==
Kungumam praised the performances of the lead actors and called it "a pleasant surprise".
