= The Broken Journey =

1994 film

- Directed by: Sandip Ray
- Written by: Satyajit Ray
- Starring: Soumitra Chatterjee; Debatosh Ghosh; Subhalakshmi Munshi
- Cinematography: Barun Raha
- Edited by: Dulal Dutta
- Music by: Sandip Ray
- Release date: 1994
- Running time: 90 minutes
- Country: India
- Language: Bengali

The Broken Journey (Bengali: Uttoran) is a 1994 Bengali drama film directed by Sandip Ray and written by Satyajit Ray. The film stars Soumitra Chatterjee, Debatosh Ghosh, and newcomer Subhalakshmi Munshi. It was screened in the Un Certain Regard section at the 1994 Cannes Film Festival. It won the National Film Award for Best Screenplay at the 41st National Film Awards.

== Cast ==
- Soumitra Chatterjee as Dr. Nihar Sengupta
- Debatosh Ghosh as Haladhar
- Subhalakshmi Munshi as Manashi
- Bina
- Mirakshi Goswani

Guest appearances

- Subhendu Chatterjee
- Lily Chakravarty
- Sadhu Meher as Jatin Kundu (uncredited)

== Production ==
The film was scripted by Satyajit Ray when he was hospitalised and is about how advancements in medical science fail to help the poor. He had cast Soumitra Chatterjee and newcomer Subhalakshmi Munshi in the film. Soumitra Chatterjee's role was based on Satyajit Ray's doctor, Dr. Kanti Bhusan Bakshi, while Subhalakshmi Munshi played an ailing villager's daughter. Satyajit Ray's son, Sandip Ray, directed the film and modified the climax. The film's first schedule was shot in Indus village, Birbhum district.

== Reception ==
Stephen Holden of The New York Times wrote, "The conviction of the performances overrides the rough spots in this spare, rather short film. From the moment the doctor begins to awaken from his moral blindness and to connect with others, the film radiates a deep and sorrowful sense of shared humanity".
