= Sagakkal =

2011 film by L. Muthukumaraswamy

- Film poster
- Directed by: L. Muthukumaraswamy
- Written by: L. Muthukumaraswamy; Bhaskar Sakthi (dialogues)
- Produced by: V. V. V. Creations
- Starring: Sanjeev; Advaitha
- Cinematography: Sri M. Azhagappan
- Edited by: A. L. Ramesh
- Music by: Thayarathnam
- Production company: V. V. V. Creations
- Release date: 12 August 2011
- Running time: 145 minutes
- Country: India
- Language: Tamil

Sagakkal (transl. Friends) is a 2011 Indian Tamil language romantic drama film directed by L. Muthukumaraswamy. The film stars Sanjeev and Advaitha, with Shankar, Enamala Shiva Shankar, Jayaprakash, Vennira Aadai Moorthy, Senthi Kumari, Sujatha Panju, M. Bhanumathi, and Pon Radha playing supporting roles. The film, produced by V. V. V. Creations, had musical score by Thayarathnam and was released on 12 August 2011.

== Plot ==
In a remote village, Mahi is an ambitious football player who aspires to work for Indian Railways on sports quota, and he lives with his widowed mother. His best friends Meiyyar and Balu often tease Mahi for being single, while Mahi hates people who are in love. One day, Mahi falls in love with Devasena at first sight. Devasena is from a wealthy and respected family. Mahi starts to tell lies about his love matter to his friends. Later, Mahi and his friends go on a pilgrimage to Palani Murugan temple, and Devasena is also part of the pilgrimage, but Mahi is unable to convey his love. When Devasena learns of Mahi loving her and lying about their love to his friends, she scolds him. Mahi, in turn, tells Devasena that his love is pure and sincerely loves her. One day, Devasena's father Varadhan is stabbed by his relative, and Mahi takes him to the hospital, thus saving his life. Devasena thanks him for saving her father. Devasena, who slowly fell in love with Mahi, agrees to marry him but only with the approval of her family. Meanwhile, Varadhan finds her a groom. Mahi and Devasena decide to elope and to get married with the help of Meiyyar and Balu. Devasena then feels bad not telling anything to her father, so she calls him and convinces him to unite them. Unfortunately, Devasena meets with an accident and dies at the hospital. Her family scolds Mahi, and a heartbroken Mahi dies on the spot.

== Cast ==
- Sanjeev as Mahi
- Advaitha as Devasena
- Shankar as Meiyyar
- Enamala Shiva Shankar as Balu
- Jayaprakash as Varadhan
- Vennira Aadai Moorthy
- Senthi Kumari as Mahi's mother
- Sujatha Panju as Devasena's mother
- M. Bhanumathi as Devasena's grandmother
- Pon Radha as Pon
- Neepa as Gayathri
- Vengal Rao as Devotee
- L. Muthukumaraswamy as Varadhan's relative
- Hello Kandasamy as Bathroom Owner
- Pattiveeranpatti Meenakshi

== Production ==
L. Muthukumaraswamy, who worked as an assistant director for Thirumurugan, made his directorial debut with Sagakkal under the banner of V. V. V. Creations. Sanjeev was cast to play the hero while Advaitha was chosen to play the role of the love interest. The music was composed by Thayarathnam, the cinematography was by Sri M. Azhagappan and the dialogues were by Bhaskar Sakthi.

== Soundtrack ==
Sagakkal

Soundtrack album by Thayarathnam
- Released: 2011
- Recorded: 2011
- Genre: Feature film soundtrack
- Length: 30:23
- Label: Life Media Pvt Ltd
- Producer: Thayarathnam

The film score and the soundtrack were composed by Thayarathnam. The soundtrack, released in 2011, features 6 tracks with lyrics written by Yugabharathi and Thayarathnam.

Tracklist
No.	Title	Singer(s)	Length
1.	"Aaru Padayappaa"	Haricharan, Mukesh Mohamed	4:52
2.	"Ithu Varaiyil"	S. P. Balasubrahmanyam, K. S. Chithra	5:07
3.	"Kandaangi Selai"	Ananthu, Suchitra	5:32
4.	"Nee Enna Ninaikkiriyaah"	Ranjith, Srimathumitha	5:41
5.	"Vilaiyaattaa"	Ranjith, Mukesh Mohamed	4:35
6.	"Yaarantha Pennavalo"	Srinivas	4:36
Total length:			30:23

== Release ==
The film was released on 12 August 2011 alongside five other films.

A critic rated the film 0.5 out of 5 and said, "The movie has an amateurish look and feel. Cinematography is a letdown and songs are just about okay. Director Muthukumarasamy must tune his direction to suit to the sensibilities of the target audience. Otherwise, his product will be stuck in the middle for want of audience".
