= Meera Krishnan =

Indian actress

- Born: 1 January 1968 (age 58); Madras, Madras State, India
- Occupation: Actress
- Years active: 1998–present
- Spouse: Krishnan
- Children: 2 (including Adithya RK)

Meera Krishnan is an Indian actress, who has appeared in Tamil-language films and television serials.

== Career ==
Meera Krishnan initially played veena for music directors Deva and Maragathamani. She then worked as an announcer for Doordarshan before working as a newsreader for the same channel and Sun TV. Meera also worked alongside Jaishankar in the television series Kuppathu Sastrigal.

== Personal life ==
She did her post graduate degree at the University of Madras and is also a singer. She is the daughter-in-law of devotional singer K. Veeramani. Her husband Krishnan has been running the recording studio Shruthilaya in Chennai for more than twenty five years. Her son Adithya Krishnan was a part of the eighth season of Super Singer.

== Filmography ==
Actress

Year	Title	Role	Notes
1998	Harichandra	Sun TV newsreader	Uncredited role
2002	Bala	Abhirami	
2002	Jjunction	Jennifer's sister-in-law	
2003	Vaseegara	Parvathi	
2003	Indru Mudhal	Krishna's mother	
2003	Kadhal Kisu Kisu	Sriram's mother	
2003	Three Roses		
2003	Kurumbu	Kalyani	
2003	Anbe Un Vasam	Jaishree	
2003	Konji Pesalaam	Chinna Thayi	
2003	Kadhal Kirukkan	Gautham's mother	
2004	Aethirree	Priya's mother	
2004	Singara Chennai	Bhuvana's mother	
2004	Vasool Raja MBBS	Mani Raja's wife	
2004	Rightaa Thappaa		
2005	Dancer		
2005	Chanakya	Commissioner's wife	
2006	Don Chera	Dhanalakshmi	
2007	Thaamirabharani	Vellathurai's wife	
2007	Thee Nagar	Murugan's mother	
2007	Muni	Priya Ganesh's mother	
2007	Koodal Nagar		
2008	Sandai	Kathiresan's mother	
2008	Tharagu		
2008	Nepali	Priya's mother	
2008	Satyam	Pandi's wife	
2008	Jeyamkondaan	Annapoorani's mother	
2008	Surya	Surya's mother	
2009	Padikkadavan	Raki's mother	
2009	Kudiyarasu	Kannan's mother	
2009	Mariyadhai	Viswanathan's wife	
2009	Guru En Aalu	Seema's mother	
2009	Thalai Ezhuthu	Raj's mother	
2009	Maasilamani	Divya's mother	
2009	Aarumaname	Vaithi's mother	
2009	Nesi	Siva's mother	
2009	Solla Solla Inikkum	Guru's mother	
2010	Maanja Velu	Velu's mother	
2010	Milaga	Thenmozhi's mother	
2010	Agam Puram	Thiru's mother	
2010	Sanikizhamai Saayangalam 5 Mani	Maha's mother	
2011	Seedan	Janaki	
2011	Siruthai	Shwetha's mother	
2011	Singam Puli	Shwetha's mother	
2011	Raa Raa		
2011	Thambikottai	Kanaga's mother	
2011	Kasethan Kadavulada		
2011	Varmam	Siva's mother	
2011	Aaranin Kaaval		
2012	Vilayada Vaa	Divya's mother	
2012	Kondaan Koduthaan	Balamani	
2012	Saguni	Penalty Officer	
2012	Suzhal		
2012	Etho Seithai Ennai	Arjun's mother	
2013	Mathil Mel Poonai	Divya's mother	
2013	Sonna Puriyathu	Shiva's mother	
2013	Naiyaandi	Chinna Vandu's mother	
2013	Pattam Pole	Anandam	Malayalam film
2013	Kolagalam	Ramya's mother	
2014	Endrendrum		
2014	Velaiilla Pattadhari	Shalini's mother	
2014	Angusam		
2014	Azhagiya Pandipuram		
2014	Appuchi Gramam		
2014	Megha	Megha's mother	
2014	Oru Modhal Oru Kadhal	Karthik's mother	
2014	Aranmanai	Murali's mother	
2014	Vanavarayan Vallavarayan	Anjali's mother	
2015	Maha Maha	Vijay's mother	
2015	36 Vayadhinile	Teacher	
2015	Vedalam	House owner’s wife	
2016	Azhagu Kutti Chellam	Brahmin	
2016	Navarasa Thilagam	Chithra's mother	
2016	Vaaliba Raja	Chithra Lakshmi	
2016	Narathan	Vishnu's mother	
2016	Uyire Uyire	Rahul's mother	
2016	Angali Pangali		
2016	Saithan	Dinesh's mother	
2016	Rekka	Bharathi's mother	
2016	Mapla Singam	Anbu's mother	
2016	Thalaiyatti Bommai		
2017	Kuttram 23	Sri Abhinaya's mother	
2017	Katha Nayagan	Kanmani's mother	
2017	Oru Mugathirai		
2017	Ayyanar Veethi		
2017	Yaanum Theeyavan	Soumya's mother	
2017	Enbathettu		
2017	Velaiilla Pattadhari 2	Shalini's mother	
2018	Mannar Vagaiyara	Madhi and Arivu's mother	
2018	Maniyaar Kudumbam	Magizhampoo's mother	
2018	Aaruthra	Shiva's mother	
2018	Genius	Dhinesh's mother	
2018	Sei	Rajarathinam's wife	
2019	Thadam	Chechi	
2019	Airaa	Yamuna's mother	
2019	Kee	Diya's mother	
2019	A1	Saravanan's mother	
2020	Varane Avashyamund	House owner's wife	Malayalam film
2020	Mei Maranthen		
2021	Namma Oorukku Ennadhan Achu	Nalla Thambi's mother	
2021	Iruvar Ullam	Karthik's mother	
2021	Maaligai	Shanti's mother	Only dubbed version released
2021	Aal Illatha Oorla Annanthan MLA		
2022	Miral	Rama's mother	
2022	Mofussil	Surya's mother	
2023	Jambu Maharishi		
2023	Kabadi Bro		
2023	Mark Antony	Ramya's mother	
2025	Dinasari	Valliyammai	
2025	Test	R. Meera Duraiswamy	
2025	Galatta Family	Chandran's mother	

== Television ==
Year	Title	Role	Channel
1998	Kuppathu Sastrigal		
1998	Oru Pennin Kathai		
1999–2000	Pushpanjali	Bhuvaneshwari Rajeev	Sun TV
2001–2004	Kavyanjali		Vijay TV
2002–2003	Annamalai		Sun TV
2003-2005	Sorgam		Sun TV
2003–2004	Roja	Vaidegi	Jaya TV
2004–2006	Manaivi		Sun TV
2006	Lakshmi	Akash's mother	Sun TV
2006–2008	Kana Kaanum Kaalangal	Raghavi's mother	Vijay TV
2008–2009	Gokulathil Seethai	Sita's mother	Kalaignar TV
2009–2010	Vasantham	Shantha Nayagi	Sun TV
2012	Aan Paavam	Mahalakshmi	Sun TV
2022	Jamelaa	Maragatham	Colors Tamil
