= Advaitha (actress) =

Indian Tamil-language film actress

- Born: Krithi Shetty
- Occupation: Actress
- Years active: 2009–2015

Krithi Shetty, known by the stage name Advaitha, is an Indian actress appearing in predominantly Tamil language films.

== Career ==
At one of her Bharatanatyam performances, theatre director Jai Theertha, noticed that the actress is very talented and he convinced her to join Samasthi Sunday School of Drama. Consequently, she pursued a diploma course in drama and performed in a play titled ‘Preethi’, later having an opportunity to play the lead role in 'Sadarame’, performing all over the state of Karnataka. Krithi collaborated with director Sunil Kumar Desai, and was ast as one of the leads in the unreleased Kannada film Sarigama. At the same time, she met Murali from the Tamil film industry who offered her an opportunity to play the lead role in Sagakkal directed by Swami. The actress then starred in Suseenthiran's critically acclaimed Azhagarsamiyin Kuthirai (2011) alongside Inigo Prabhakaran, before featuring in another little known Tamil film Kondaan Koduthaan, the following year.

In 2013, she changed her screen name from Advaitha to her original name in time for the release of Snehavin Kadhalargal. She noted that the name Advaitha had been chosen for numerological reasons, but stated she did not like the way people pronounced the name.

== Filmography ==
Year	Film	Role	Notes
2011	Azhagarsamiyin Kuthirai	Devi	
2011	Sagakkal	Devasena	
2012	Kondaan Koduthaan	Sevandhi	
2013	Pandiya Naadu	Amudha	
2014	Snehavin Kadhalarkal	Sneha	
2015	Maanga	Joshitha	
