= U. K. Murali =

Indian singer and music composer

U.K. Murali
- Occupations: Conductor, Singer, composer
- Years active: 2012–present
- Website: www.ukmurali.com

U. K. Murali is an Indian singer and music composer, who works predominantly in Tamil films.

== Career ==
UK Murali has regularly performed Ilaiyaraaja songs in his music troupe. He has sung for 18 hours non-stop in 25 different voices at Kamarajar Arangam Chennai. He has collaborated with Jai Akash on several films, some of which remain unreleased.

== Discography ==
- Win (2013; Telugu)
- Naankam Thamizhan (2013)
- Kadhalukku Kanillai (2014)
- Maharani Kottai (2015)
- Naan Yaar (2016)
- Ayyanar Veethi (2017)
- Chennai 2 Bangkok (2019)

As singer

- "Ilanthari Ilanthari" - Soozhnilai (2012)
- "Ithu Namma Bhoomi" - A. R. Rahman (2013)
- Voter Awareness Song by Rajesh Lakhani (2016)

== Filmography ==
Television

- Idhu Oru Kadhayin Kadhai (DD Podhigai)
