= Azhagarsamiyin Kuthirai =

- Theatrical release poster
- Directed by: Suseenthiran
- Screenplay by: Suseenthiran
- Based on: Azhagarsamiyin Kudhirai by Bhaskar Sakthi
- Produced by: P. Madhan
- Starring: Appukutty; Saranya Mohan
- Cinematography: Theni Eswar
- Edited by: Kasi Viswanathan
- Music by: Ilaiyaraaja
- Production company: Escape Artists Motion Pictures
- Distributed by: Cloud Nine Movies
- Release date: 12 May 2011
- Running time: 117 minutes
- Country: India
- Language: Tamil
- Budget: ₹4.5 crore

Azhagarsamiyin Kuthirai (transl. Azhagarsami's Horse) is a 2011 Indian Tamil-language mystery comedy drama film directed by Suseenthiran, based on the short story of the same name penned by writer Bhaskar Sakthi. The film stars Appukutty and Saranya Mohan in lead and features music by Ilaiyaraaja. The film was produced by Escape Artists Motion Pictures and distributed by Cloud Nine Movies. It was released on 12 May 2011.

The film was screened at the 2011 Toronto International Film Festival, becoming the second Tamil film to be screened there after Kannathil Muthamittal (2002). In 2012, the film was honored with two National Film Awards for Best Popular Film Providing Wholesome Entertainment and Best Supporting Actor for Appukutty.

== Plot ==
The story is set in a village called Mallayapuram near Theni. The villagers believe the Rain Gods will favour them after the annual Temple Festival (Thiruvizha), during which the deity is taken around the village on a wooden horse. They are in for a rude shock when the horse goes missing. At the same time, Azhagarsami, a youngster who earns his livelihood by ferrying loads on his horse in Aagamalai village in Periyakulam, gets ready for his marriage. His horse also goes missing, and his marriage is put on hold. Whether the villagers and Azhagarsami find their respective horses or not forms the rest of the story.

== Cast ==
- Appukutty as Azhagarsami
- Saranya Mohan as Rani
- Inigo Prabhakar as Ramakrishnan
- Advaitha as Devi
- Soori as Chandran
- Aruldoss as Rajaram
- Yogi Devaraj as Rani's father
- Azhagan Tamizhmani
- Krishnamoorthy as Priest
- Supergood Subramani as Priest
- Thavasi as Soothsayer

== Release ==
=== Critical reception ===
Rediff's Pavithra Srinivasan labelled the film as "brilliant" and "a must-watch for its unconventional story-line, protagonists and plot-points", giving it 3.5/5. Sify's critic described the film as "good" that deserved a "viewing because films like this are hard and few to find in these days of mass masala", further citing that Suseenthiran had "come out with another beautiful feel good film that pulls at your heart strings." The Hindu critic Malathi Rangarajan, too, gave a positive feedback, describing the film as an "innovative" and "interesting attempt" that stayed "within the format of commercial cinema even while steering clear of formula!" Anupama Subramanian from Deccan Chronicle termed the film as a "simple, heartwarming and refreshing deviation from the mainstream mayhem [that] definitely warrants a watch", while giving it three out of five too.

=== International screenings ===
The film is the only South Indian candidate to be selected for screening at the 2011 Toronto International Film Festival in the contemporary world cinema category.

== Awards ==
National Film Awards

- Best Popular Film Providing Wholesome Entertainment
- Best Supporting Actor - Appukutty

== Soundtrack ==
Azhagarsamiyin Kudhirai

Soundtrack album by Ilaiyaraaja
- Released: 16 March 2011
- Recorded: 2010
- Genre: Feature film soundtrack
- Length: 16:35
- Label: Sony Music India
- Producer: Ilaiyaraaja

Ilaiyaraaja chronology
Ponnar Shankar (2011)	Azhagarsamiyin Kudhirai (2011)	Hare Rama Hare Krishna (2011)

Following collaborations with V. Selvaganesh and Yuvan Shankar Raja, Suseenthiran worked with Ilaiyaraaja for the musical score of Azhagarsamiyin Kuthirai. The soundtrack album, consisting of only three songs, was released on 16 March 2011 at Sathyam Cinemas, with while Ilaiyaraaja himself launching the audio. The song "Poovakkelu" is set in Pahadi.

Track listing
No.	Title	Lyrics	Singer(s)	Length
1.	"Kuthikkira Kuthikkira"	J. Francis Kiruba	Ilaiyaraaja	5:55
2.	"Adiye Ivale"	Snehan	Thanjai Selvi, Snehan, Lenin Bharathi, Hemambika, Murugan, Iyyappan, Master Regan, Senthildass Velayutham, Anita	5:19
3.	"Poovakkelu"	Yugabharathi	Karthik, Shreya Ghoshal	5:21
Total length:				16:35
