= Bhavatharini =

Indian playback singer and composer (1976–2024)

- Born: Bhavatharini Raja; 23 July 1976; Madras (now Chennai), Tamil Nadu, India
- Died: 25 January 2024 (aged 47) Colombo, Western Province, Sri Lanka
- Occupations: Playback singer; Composer
- Years active: 1984-2024
- Spouse: Sabariraj

Bhavatharini Raja (23 July 1976 – 25 January 2024) was an Indian playback singer and composer. She was the only daughter of noted composer Ilaiyaraaja and sister of composers and singers Yuvan Shankar Raja and Karthik Raja. Starting her career in the 1990s, she mostly sang songs under the direction of her father and brothers. She was awarded the National Film Award for Best Female Playback Singer in 2000 for her rendition of the song "Mayil Pola Ponnu Onnu" from the film Bharathi, composed by her father.

== Career ==
Bhavatharini Raja made her debut as a playback singer for My Dear Kuttichathan. From then onwards, she mostly sang on albums composed by her father and brothers.

In 2001, she won the National Award for the song "Mayil Pola Ponnu Onnu" in the movie Bharathi (the music director was her father).

Bhavatharini featured as one of the composers for the 2002 film Mitr, My Friend, directed by Revathi, starring Shobhana. She then forayed into the Telugu film industry with Avuna (2003). She also composed music for Phir Milenge, also directed by Revathi, starring Shilpa Shetty, Abhishek Bachchan and Salman Khan. In June 2012, she was roped in to score the tunes for Vellachi, a village-based project.

== Personal life and death ==
Bhavatharani studied at Rosary Matric School in Chennai. This was followed by higher secondary school in Adarsh Vidyalaya, Peters Road, Chennai. Bhavatharini was married to an advertising executive, R. Sabariraj, son of S.N. Ramachandran. Ramachandran is a former journalist who went into publishing and started Kannan Advertising. The couple did not have children.

Bhavatharini died from cancer on 25 January 2024, at the age of 47, while being treated for the disease in Colombo, Sri Lanka. Her body was taken to her father's home in Chennai, and later to her ancestral village, where she was cremated.

== Discography ==
=== As playback singer ===
==== Tamil ====
List of Bhavatharini Tamil film credits as playback singer
Year	Album	Song	Composer	Co-singer(s)	Notes
1988	En Bommukutty Ammavuku	"Kuyile Kuyile"	Ilaiyaraaja	K. S. Chithra	
1989	Thendral Sudum	"Dhoori Dhoori"	Ilaiyaraaja	Yuvan Shankar Raja	
1990	Anjali	"Something Something"	Ilaiyaraaja	Karthik Raja	Along with Yuvan Shankar Raja, Venkat Prabhu, Premgi Amaren, Bala, Parthi Bhaskar, Hari Bhaskar
1990	Anjali	"Iravu Nilavu"	Ilaiyaraaja	S Janaki	Along with Yuvan Shankar Raja, Venkat Prabhu, Premgi Amaren, Bala, Parthi Bhaskar, Hari Bhaskar
1990	Anjali	"Anjali Anjali"	Ilaiyaraaja	Sathya, Vaishnavi	Along with Yuvan Shankar Raja, Venkat Prabhu, Premgi Amaren, Bala, Parthi Bhaskar, Hari Bhaskar
1990	Anjali	"Vaanam Namakku"	Ilaiyaraaja	Karthik Raja	Along with Yuvan Shankar Raja, Venkat Prabhu, Premgi Amaren, Bala, Parthi Bhaskar, Hari Bhaskar
1990	Anjali	"Motta Maadi"	Ilaiyaraaja	Karthik Raja	Along with Yuvan Shankar Raja, Venkat Prabhu, Premgi Amaren, Bala, Parthi Bhaskar, Hari Bhaskar
1994	Sethupathi IPS	"Anadhai Endru"	Ilaiyaraaja		
1995	Raasaiyya	"Masthana Masthana"	Ilaiyaraaja	Arunmozhi, S.N Surendhar	Debut as solo playback singer
1995	Chandralekha	"Anal Thanil Vaadidum"	Ilaiyaraaja		
1996	Irattai Roja	"Unnai Vidamaaten"	Ilaiyaraaja	S. P. Balasubrahmanyam	
1996	Katta Panchayathu	"Oru Chinna Mani"	Ilaiyaraaja	Jolly Abraham	
1996	Karuvelam Pookkal	"Pallakku Vanthirukku"	Ilaiyaraaja		
1996	Alexander	"Alexander"	Karthik Raja	Anupama, Mahanadhi Shobana, Yuvan Shankar Raja, S. P. B. Charan	
1996	Alexander	"Nadhiyoram"	Karthik Raja	P. Unnikrishnan	
1996	Enakkoru Magan Pirappan	"Chum Chum"	Karthik Raja	Karthik Raja	
1996	Manikkam	"Sundararae Muzhu"	Karthik Raja	S. P. Balasubrahmanyam	
1996	Manikkam	"Santhanam Theychachi"	Karthik Raja		
1996	Manikkam	"Thottu Sel Idam"	Karthik Raja		
1997	Aravindhan	"All The Best"	Yuvan Shankar Raja	Hariharan	
1997	Ullaasam	"Mutthey Mutthamma"	Karthik Raja	Kamal Haasan, Swarnalatha	
1997	Ullaasam	"Yaaro Yaar Yaaro"	Karthik Raja	Ilaiyaraaja	
1997	Ullaasam	"Valibam Vaazha Sollum"	Karthik Raja	Karthik Raja, Shruti Haasan, Prabhu Deva	Additional vocals only
1997	Thedinen Vanthathu	"Aalps Malaikkaattru"	Sirpy	Hariharan	
1997	Raman Abdullah	"En Veettu Jannal"	Ilaiyaraaja	Arunmozhi	
1997	Kadhalukku Mariyadhai	"Ennai Thalaata"	Ilaiyaraaja	Hariharan	Only humming
1997	Kadhalukku Mariyadhai	"Idhu Sangeetha Thirunalo"	Ilaiyaraaja		
1997	Kadhalukku Mariyadhai	"O Baby"	Ilaiyaraaja	Vijay	Only humming
1997	Naanum Oru Indian	"Un Kadhalan"	Ilaiyaraaja	Unnikrishnan	The film was released as Desiya Paravai in 2006
1997	Kadavul	"Aadi Sivan Tholil"	Ilaiyaraaja		
1997	Nerukku Ner	"Thudikindra Kadhal (Evar Kandaar)"	Deva	Mano	
1998	Naam Iruvar Namakku Iruvar	"Nadanakalarani'"	Karthik Raja	Yuvan Shankar Raja, Premji Amaran	
1998	Kaathala Kaathala	"Madonna Paadala"	Karthik Raja	Kamal Haasan, Hariharan	
1998	Kaathala Kaathala	"Laila Laila"	Karthik Raja	Hariharan	
1998	Kalyana Galatta	"Adhaam Yevaal"	Yuvan Shankar Raja	Venkat Prabhu	
1998	Velai	"Oyvedu Nilave"	Yuvan Shankar Raja	P. Unnikrishnan	
1998	Kizhakkum Merkkum	"Akka Nee Sirichcha"	Ilaiyaraaja		
1998	Kizhakkum Merkkum	"Poongaatrae"	Ilaiyaraaja		
1998	Senthooram	"Aalamaram"	Ilaiyaraaja	P. Unnikrishnan	
1998	Kannathal	"Amman Pugazhai Paada"	Ilaiyaraaja		
1998	Poonthottam	"New Year"	Ilaiyaraaja	Karthik Raja, Yuvan Shankar Raja, Venkat Prabhu, Premji Amaran, Mano, Malaysia Vasudevan	
1998	Kangalin Vaarthaigal	"Nenjathin Geetham"	Ilaiyaraaja	P. Unnikrishnan	
1998	Kangalin Vaarthaigal	"Indha Kadhal"	Ilaiyaraaja		
1998	Kaadhal Kavithai	"Alai Meethu"	Ilaiyaraaja		
1998	Poonjolai	"Un Perai Kettale"	Ilaiyaraaja	Yugendran	
1998	Poonjolai	"Gaana Kuyile"	Ilaiyaraaja	S. P. Balasubramaniam	
1999	Ponnu Veetukkaran	"Ilaya Nilave"	Ilaiyaraaja	Srinivas	
1999	Thodarum	"Oru Thulir Onnu"	Ilaiyaraaja	P. Unnikrishnan	
1999	Time	"Thavikkiren Thavikkiren"	Ilaiyaraaja	Hariharan	
1999	Rajasthan	"Sorgathil Nikkah"	Ilaiyaraaja	Shankar Mahadevan	
1999	Annan	"Kanmanikku Vaazhthu"	Ilaiyaraaja		
1999	Manam Virumbuthe Unnai	"Kutti Kuyilai"	Ilaiyaraaja	Hariharan	
1999	Manam Virumbuthe Unnai	"Ilavenirkaala Panjami"	Ilaiyaraaja	Hariharan	Only humming
1999	Kummi Paattu	"Chinna Manasu"	Ilaiyaraaja		Ilayaraja
1999	Poovellam Kettuppar	"Poothathu"	Yuvan Shankar Raja		Cameo appearance; First on-screen appearance
2000	Kadhal Rojavae	'"Sirithale"	Ilaiyaraaja		
2000	Kakkai Siraginilae	"Gayathiri Ketkum"	Ilaiyaraaja	P. Unnikrishnan	
2000	Bharathi	"Mayil Pola Ponnu Onnu"	Ilaiyaraaja		National Film Award for Best Female Playback Singer
2000	Karisakattu Poove	"Mamarathula"	Ilaiyaraaja	P. Unnikrishnan	
2000	Karuvelam Pookkal	"Pallakku Vanthirukku"	Ilaiyaraaja		
2000	Ilaiyavan	"Nilavil Amuthu"	Ilaiyaraaja	P. Unnikrishnan	
2001	Dheena	"Nee Illai Endral"	Yuvan Shankar Raja	Murugan	
2001	Friends	"Thendral Varum"	Ilaiyaraaja	Hariharan	
2001	Vaanchinathan	"Adi Rendu"	Karthik Raja	P. Unnikrishnan	
2001	Kanna Unnai Thedukiren	"Vanji Kodi"	Ilaiyaraaja	Hariharan	
2001	Aandan Adimai	"Enna Enna Paada"	Ilaiyaraaja	Harini	
2001	Manadhai Thirudivittai	"Sadugudugudu Aadathey"	Yuvan Shankar Raja	Hariharan	
2002	Azhagi	"Oliyile Therivadhu Devadhaya"	Ilaiyaraaja	Karthik	
2002	Azhagi	"Damakku Damakku Dum"	Ilaiyaraaja		
2002	En Mana Vaanil	"Muthu Muthu"	Ilaiyaraaja	Karthik	
2002	Ramanaa	"Vaanam Adhirave"	Ilaiyaraaja	P. Unnikrishnan, Sadhana Sargam	
2002	Solla Marandha Kadhai	"Yaedho Onnu"	Ilaiyaraaja	Karthik	
2002	Album	"Muttaikull"	Karthik Raja		
2003	Puthiya Geethai	"Mercury Poove"	Yuvan Shankar Raja	Nideesh Gopalan, Bonnie Chakraborty	
2003	Punnagai Poove	Eno Uyirmele	Yuvan Shankar Raja		
2003	Pithamagan	"Kodi Yethi Vaippom"	Ilaiyaraaja	Shanmugasundari, Periya Karuppa Thevar, Harish Raghavendra	
2003	Dhanush	"Vellipaniyai"	Ilaiyaraaja	Vijay Yesudas	Unreleased film
2003	Konji Pesalaam	"Konji Pesalaam"	Ilaiyaraaja		
2003	Ragasiyamai	"Kangalum Kangalum"	Karthik Raja	KK	
2003	Three Roses	"Anbal Unnai"	Karthik Raja	Annupamaa, Febi Mani	
2003	Three Roses	"Oh Oh Sexy"	Karthik Raja	Rohini	
2004	Vishwa Thulasi	"Vishwa Thulasi"	M. S. Viswanathan		
2005	Oru Naal Oru Kanavu	"Kaatril Varum Geethame I"	Ilaiyaraaja	Shreya Ghoshal, Sadhana Sargam, Hariharan	
2005	Oru Naal Oru Kanavu	"Kaatril Varum Geethame II"	Ilaiyaraaja	Shreya Ghosal	
2005	Karagattakkari	"Kattukkili"	Ilaiyaraaja	Karthik	
2005	Adhu Oru Kana Kaalam	"Killi Thattu"	Ilaiyaraaja	Jothi	
2005	Pon Megalai	"Aalapanai"	Ilaiyaraaja	Sadhana Sargam	
2005	Rightaa Thappaa	"Thottuvidu"	Karthik Raja		
2006	Azhagai Irukkirai Bayamai Irukkirathu	"Kanavae Kalaigirathe"	Yuvan Shankar Raja	Yuvan Shankar Raja	
2006	Azhagai Irukkirai Bayamai Irukkirathu	"Elaiyudhir Kaalam"	Yuvan Shankar Raja	Yuvan Shankar Raja, Bobby, Reeta, Reshmi, Ranjith, Naveen Madhav	
2006	Thaamirabharani	"Thaaliyae Thevaiyillai"	Yuvan Shankar Raja	Hariharan	
2006	Kadhale En Kadhale	"Maya"	Prayog		
2006	Ilakkanam	"Oorukku Nalladhu"	Bhavatharini		
2007	Vasantham Vanthachu	"Nenjam"	Oviyan		
2007	Naalaiya Pozhuthum Unnodu	"Pesa Paraasa"	Srikanth Deva	Karthik	
2008	Uliyin Osai	"Kaalathai Vendra"	Ilaiyaraaja	Sriram Parthasarathy	
2008	Dhanam	"Kannanukku Enna"	Ilaiyaraaja	Sriram Parthasarathy, Prasanna	
2008	Chakkara Viyugam	"Idhu Thaan Chakraviyugam"	Karthik Raja		
2009	Azhagar Malai	"Unnai Enakku"	Ilaiyaraaja	Rita	
2009	Kannukulle	"Paattu Ketka"	Ilaiyaraaja	Tippu, Rahul Nambiar, Prasanna, Mukesh Mohamed, Velmurugan	
2010	Avargalum Ivargalum	"Enna Thavam Senjiputten"	Srikanth Deva		
2010	Ochayee	"Kammangaatukulle"	Jeevaraja	Harish Raghavendra	
2010	Goa	"Yelelu Thalamuraikkum"	Yuvan Shankar Raja	Karthik Raja, Venkat Prabhu, Premji Amaran, Yuvan Shankar Raja	
2011	Mankatha	"Kannadi Nee"	Yuvan Shankar Raja	S. P. B. Charan	
2012	Aravaan	"Unna Kolla Poren"	Karthik	M. L. R. Karthikeyan	
2012	Maranthen Mannithen (D)	"Alaiyodu Alaiyaga"	Ilaiyaraaja		
2012	Mayilu	"Yathe"	Ilaiyaraaja	Sriram Parthasarathy	
2012	Ullam	Oh Iyarkaiyai	Yuvan Shankar Raja		
2013	Aadhalal Kadhal Seiveer	"Thappu Thanda"	Yuvan Shankar Raja	Javed Ali	
2013	Biriyani	"Biriyani"	Yuvan Shankar Raja	Tanvi Shah, Vilasini	
2014	Anegan	"Aathadi Aathadi"	Harris Jayaraj	Tippu and Dhanush	
2014	Irumbu Kuthirai	"Penne Penne"	G. V. Prakash Kumar	G. V. Prakash	
2019	RK Nagar	"Adiye"	Premgi Amaren	Ranjith	
2021	Maanaadu	"Meherezylaa"	Yuvan Shankar Raja	Yuvan Shankar Raja, Rizwan	
2022	Maamanithan	"Pannapurathu"	Ilaiyaraaja, Yuvan Shankar Raja	Sriram Parthasarathy	Credited as Raja Bhavatharini
2024	Aariyamala	"Aththi Poovapola"	Selvanambi		
2024	The Greatest of All Time	"Chinna Chinna Kangal"	Yuvan Shankar Raja	Vijay, Yuvan Shankar Raja	Posthumously released AI Generated Voice
2024	The Greatest of All Time	"Chinna Chinna Kangal"	Yuvan Shankar Raja	Vijay, Yuvan Shankar Raja	Credited as Raja Bhavatharini
2025	Dinasari	"Kadhalikka Poiya Solla"	Ilayaraja	Ranjith, Priya Jenson	

==== Malayalam ====
List of Bhavatharini Malayalam film credits as playback singer
Year	Album	Song	Composer	Co-singer(s)	Notes
1984	My Dear Kuttichathan	"Thithithey Thaalam"	Ilaiyaraaja		
1997	Kaliyoonjal	"Kalyaanappallakkil Velippayyan"	Ilaiyaraaja		
1997	Kaliyoonjal	"Shaaradendu Paadi"	Ilaiyaraaja	K. J. Yesudas, Ilaiyaraaja	
2000	Kochu Kochu Santhoshangal	"Palappoomazha"	Ilaiyaraaja		
2005	Ponmudipuzhayorathu	"Naadaswaram Ketto"	Ilaiyaraaja	Asha G. Menon	
2007	Ajantha	"Aarum Thodatha Poovil"	Ilaiyaraaja	Madhu Balakrishnan	

==== Kannada ====
List of Bhavatharini Kannada film credits as playback singer
Year	Album	Song	Composer	Co-singer(s)	Notes
2001	Usire	"Preethisuve Preethisuve"	Ilaiyaraaja	K. J. Yesudas	
2001	Hoo Anthiya Uhoo Anthiya	"Belli Chandiranu"	Karthik Raja	Madhu Balakrishnan	
2006	Geeya Geeya	"Hrudayadi Kadana"	Bhavatharini		
2007	Ajantha	"Yaaru Hogada Jaaga"	Ilaiyaraaja	Vijay Yesudas	

==== Telugu ====
List of Bhavatharini Telugu film credits as playback singer
Year	Album	Song	Composer	Co-singer(s)	Notes
1998	Navvandi Lavvandi (D)	"Madona I"	Karthik Raja	Kamal Haasan	
2001	Dumm Dumm Dumm (D)	"Nee Pere Inthandham"	Karthik Raja	Harish Raghavendra	
2002	Malli Malli Chudali	"Vennelalo"	Yuvan Shankar Raja	P. Unnikrishnan	
2007	Anumanaspadam	"Rela Rela Rela"	Ilaiyaraaja	Tippu	
2013	Gundello Godari	"Nanu Neetho"	Ilaiyaraaja		
2013	Biriyani (D)	"Biriyani"	Yuvan Shankar Raja	Tanvi Shah, Vilasini	

==== Hindi ====
List of Bhavatharini Hindi film credits as playback singer
Year	Album	Song	Composer	Co-singer(s)	Notes
2009	Paa	"Gumm Summ Gumm"	Ilaiyaraaja	Shravan	

=== Non-film songs ===
Year	Album	Song	Language	Composer	Co-singer(s)	Notes	Ref(s)
2005	Thiruvasakam in Symphony	"Pooerukonum Purantharanum"	Tamil	Ilaiyaraaja	Ilaiyaraaja	The first Indian oratorio ever	

=== Television ===
Year	Serial	Song	Language	Composer	Television	Notes
2007	Suryavamsam	"Keladi Penne"	Tamil	Mani Sharma	Sun TV	Produced by Radaan

=== As composer ===
Year	Title	Language	Notes	Ref.
2002	Mitr, My Friend	Hindi; Tamil	credited as Bhavatharini Ilayaraaja	
2003	Avuna	Telugu	credited as Bhavatharini Ilayaraaja	
2004	Phir Milenge	Hindi	credited as Bhavatha Raja	
2006	Amirtham	Tamil		
2006	Ilakkanam	Tamil		
2006	Geeya Geeya	Kannada	credited as Bhavatharini Ilayaraaja	
2012	Vellachi	Tamil		
2012	Porida Pazhagu	Tamil	Unreleased	
2018	Kalvargal	Tamil	Unreleased	
2019	Maayanadhi	Tamil		
2024	Puyalil Oru Thoni	Tamil	Unreleased; posthumous	

== Filmography ==
Year	Film	Role	Language(s)	Notes
1999	Poovellam Kettuppar	Herself	Tamil	Special appearance in the song "Poothathu"
2010	Goa	Herself	Tamil	
