= Ullaasam =

- Theatrical release poster
- Directed by: J. D.–Jerry
- Written by: Balakumaran (Dialogues)
- Screenplay by: J. D.–Jerry
- Story by: J. D.–Jerry
- Produced by: Amitabh Bachchan
- Starring: Ajith Kumar; Vikram; Maheswari
- Cinematography: Jeeva
- Edited by: B. Lenin; V. T. Vijayan
- Music by: Karthik Raja
- Production company: Amitabh Bachchan Corporation
- Release date: 23 May 1997
- Running time: 136 minutes
- Country: India
- Language: Tamil

Ullaasam (transl. Joy) is a 1997 Indian Tamil-language romantic action film directed and co-written by the duo J. D.–Jerry (in their directorial debut) and produced by Amitabh Bachchan. The film stars Ajith Kumar, Vikram and Maheswari in the lead roles, with Raghuvaran, S. P. Balasubrahmanyam and Srividya in other pivotal roles. It was released on 23 May 1997 to mixed reviews. This is the only film where both Ajith and Vikram have acted together.

== Plot ==
Arms trafficking crime boss JK is Dev's father and JK's neighbour, Thangaiah, a government bus driver is the father of Guru. As a child, Guru is drawn to JK's activities and begins following in his footsteps. One day, Guru witnesses JK committing a murder, but lies to the police about it, and JK takes him under his control, raising him as his protégé. Meanwhile, JK's biological son, Dev, is raised by his grandmother, who fears he'll follow in JK's footsteps. She requests Guru's mother to care for Dev and nurtures his interest in music. Thangaiah, saddened that his son Guru is distancing himself and getting closer to JK, tries to convince Guru to leave the path of violence, but to no avail. Ironically, Thangaiah raises JK's son, Dev, as his own, instilling good values in him.

In college, Dev is a popular singer with a "lover boy" image, while Guru is a skilled dancer and a goon who helps JK in his business. Although they grow up in each other's houses, they share neither a close bond nor animosity, but rather a mutual understanding for each other. Megha joins the same college, returning from America, and befriends Dev. However, her meetings with Guru turn sour, and she's appalled by Guru's involvement in JK's illicit activities. Despite this, she is impressed by Dev's music and kisses his hand in admiration, which Dev mistakenly believe is her way of showing that she is in love with him. Megha later joins Guru's dance group on her friend's recommendation, and Guru begins teaching her dance. As they spend more time together, Megha encourages Guru to reform, and they eventually fall in love. However, when Guru is attacked by JK's rivals and arrested, Megha learns more about his violent nature.

After witnessing Guru's brutal treatment in police custody, Thangaiah confronts JK about turning his son into a criminal. Megha decides to distance herself from Guru, hoping he'll reform. She spends more time with Dev, confronts Guru, and advises him to leave violence behind. Guru promises to change, and Megha hopes for his redemption. Before Guru could inform JK that he wants to leave the violent life, JK assigns him a job to smuggle "Blue Jager" diamonds, for which Guru accepts the task and hides them in a bus to evade JK's rival, Dhamodharan's, goons. Dhamodharan captures one of JK's men, Gundurao, and learns about the diamond's whereabouts. Meanwhile, Megha calls JK, stating that Guru will no longer continue working under JK. However, she witnesses Guru being chased by Dhamodharan's men and is heartbroken that Guru hasn't reformed despite promising her. The next day, Thangaiah drives the bus where the diamond is hidden, and Dhamodharan's men ransack the bus, holding Thangaiah at gunpoint. Dev rushes to rescue Thangaiah and the passengers, and after a intense chase and fight, he saves them but Thangaiah suffers a head injury.

Dev takes the diamond and hands it over to JK, criticising his violent ways and advising him not to harm Guru for the sake of money and rivalry. At the hospital, Thangaiah reads Dev's love letter to Megha and realises Dev's love for her. Thangaiah pleads with Guru to leave Megha for her own good, given his involvement in crime. Moved by his father's words, Guru decides to distance himself from Megha. JK also begins to reform for Guru's sake. However, Chatterjee manipulates Guru into working for him, playing on Guru's desire to be hated by Megha. Guru agrees, hoping Megha will despise him. Megha confronts JK and seeks his help to reunite her with Guru, unaware of Guru's new allegiance to Chatterjee. The reformed JK decides to set right Guru's life, which he had ruined by dragging him into violence. JK wants Dev's assistance to unite Guru with his lover, Megha. Dev is shocked to learn that she loves Guru. Despite his own feelings, Dev decides to step aside and help unite the couple, choosing to hide his emotions.

Meanwhile, Chatterjee manipulates Guru into smuggling drugs without his knowledge, and Megha, heartbroken, plans to return to America. JK intervenes, stopping Guru and urging him to reform. However, Guru reveals that he's been involved in violence only to distance himself from Megha, as Dev loves her. This revelation shocks JK. Dev motivates Guru to be with Megha, as she truly loves him, not Dev. When Chatterjee tries to stop JK from handing over the drugs to the customs, he kidnaps Megha at the airport. Dev and Guru rush to rescue her, leading to a chase and shootout. Ultimately, Chatterjee is apprehended by the police, and Guru reunites with Megha. When Megha asks Dev about his lover, he hints at a dream without revealing his true feelings for her. The film concludes with Dev leaving, wishing Guru and Megha a happy future, while Guru chooses to leave his violent life behind for Megha's sake.

== Cast ==
- Ajith Kumar as Gurumoorthy "Guru"
- Vikram as Dev
- Maheswari as Megha
- Raghuvaran as JK, Dev's father
- S. P. Balasubrahmanyam as Thangaiah, Guru's father
- Devan as Chatterjee
- Srividya as Guru's mother
- M. N. Rajam as Dev's grandmother
- Indhu as Megha's friend
- Ajay Rathnam as Pal Pandi, Chatterjee's henchman
- Bala Singh as Dhamodharan
- R. S. Shivaji as Chatterjee's henchman
- Vincent Roy as an Inspector
- Dhamu as a college peon
- Thennavan
- Deepa Venkat as Dev's friend
- Singamuthu as Thangaiah's neighbour
- Vaiyapuri as Gopalu (uncredited)
- K. B. Mohan (uncredited)
- Raju Sundaram (special appearance in the song "Vaalibam Vaazha Sollum")
- Japan Kumar (special appearance in the song "Vaalibam Vaazha Sollum")
- Master Jayanth (special appearance in the song "Vaalibam Vaazha Sollum")

== Production ==
The film became Amitabh Bachchan's first Tamil film production under his banner, Amitabh Bachchan Corporation and as a result, he chose to select several leading actors for the project. This is the first film Ajith Kumar signed on after the success of Kadhal Kottai (1996), whilst Maheswari, the cousin of actress Sridevi, was signed after enjoying success in Telugu films. The makers initially tried to cast Arun Vijay in a parallel lead role, but his reluctance to work on dual hero films meant that Vikram was signed. Moreover, the film boasted of a strong supporting cast of Raghuvaran, S. P. Balasubrahmanyam and Srividya, whilst Jeeva as cinematographer and Raju Sundaram as choreographer were also amongst the most prolific options in the Tamil film industry at their respective occupations. The director duo J. D.–Jerry were signed on after Amitabh Bachchan Corporation Limited had been a part of the marketing team in some of the serial episodes they had directed. Abdullah, actress Khushbu's brother, and Roshini, actress Nagma's sister, were also reported to be a part of the initial cast but eventually did not feature. The film was briefly delayed due to the FEFSI strike of 1997. Furthermore, during production Ajith suffered due to the dancing and fighting involved which caused problems for his back, leading to a further round of corrective surgery.

== Soundtrack ==
Ullaasam

Soundtrack album by Karthik Raja
- Released: 1997
- Genre: Feature film soundtrack
- Length: 29:09
- Language: Tamil
- Label: Think Tapes

Karthik Raja chronology
Grahan (1997)	Ullaasam (1997)	Naam Iruvar Namakku Iruvar (1998)
External audio
- Ullaasam – Jukebox on YouTube

The soundtrack was composed by Karthik Raja. The song "Cho Larey" is based on the 1977 Peruvian song "La Colegiala", and was shot in Switzerland. The song "Veesum Kaatrukku", which borrows its intro from "Listen With Your Heart" from Pocahontas (1995), was well received upon release. The opening of "Yaaro Yaar Yaaro" is based on Gustav Mahler's Symphony No. 4, while another part of the song adapts Joseph Haydn's Trumpet Concerto.

Track listing
No.	Title	Lyrics	Singer(s)	Length
1.	"Cho Larey"	Paarthi Bhaskar	S. P. Balasubrahmanyam, Harini, Venkat Prabhu	4:55
2.	"Ilavenil Thalattum"	Gangai Amaran	P. Unnikrishnan	1:02
3.	"Konjum Manjal"	Palani Bharathi	Hariharan, Harini	5:34
4.	"Mutthey Mutthamma"	Paarthi Bhaskar	Kamal Haasan, Swarnalatha, Bhavatharini	5:04
5.	"Valibam Vaazha Sollum"	Paarthi Bhaskar, Arunmozhi (rap)	Karthik Raja, Prabhu Deva (rap), Shruti Haasan; Voiceovers: Ajith Kumar, Vikram, Maheswari	5:01
6.	"Veesum Kaatrukku"	Palani Bharathi	P. Unnikrishnan, Harini	4:59
7.	"Yaaro Yaar Yaaro"	Arivumathi	Ilaiyaraaja, Bhavatharini	2:34
Total length:				29:09

== Release and reception ==
Ullaasam was released on 23 May 1997, and received mixed reviews. R. P. R. of Kalki called the film's screenplay as Pallavan bus which goes in a speed then faces sudden breakdown often. K. N. Vijiyan of New Straits Times appreciated the film's "moral arguments" and added, "There are a lot of shooting scenes, which are shown in slow motion, so violence does not really dominate what is essentially a love story". However, he criticised Vikram's inconsistent characterisation, initially as a "soft character" and later as a "Bruce Willis"-like figure who shows proficiency in firearms despite never having touched one before.

The film became a financial failure at the Tamil Nadu box office, and became one of the five consecutive failure films by Ajith in 1997. Post-release, Vikram acknowledged the film for expanding his female fan base as a result of the soft-personality of his character. Talking about the theatrical run of the film, the directors felt that "overkill" of the subject may have turned audiences away, and stated the youth-centric feel was similar to two earlier releases during the same period, Kadhal Desam (1996) and Minsara Kanavu (1997).

== Potential remake ==
In October 2019, J. D.–Jerry expressed an interest in remaking the film with Vikram Prabhu in Ajith's role and Dulquer Salmaan in Vikram's role, with Pattukkottai Prabakar also working on an early draft for the new version.
