= Ragasiyamai =

- DVD cover
- Directed by: Amudhan
- Written by: Amudhan
- Produced by: John Pandian; Graham
- Starring: Prasanna; Neelam Singh
- Cinematography: Amuthan
- Music by: Karthik Raja
- Production companies: Art and Heart Movie Makers
- Release date: 27 September 2003
- Country: India
- Language: Tamil

Ragasiyamai (transl. Secretly) is a 2003 Tamil-language romance film directed by Amudhan. The film stars Prasanna and Neelan, while Karunas and Ilavarasu played supporting roles.

The film's title is based on a song from Dumm Dumm Dumm (2001), which also had music by Karthik Raja.

== Cast ==
- Prasanna as Amudhan
- Neelam Singh as Vijayalakshmi
- Karunas as Sura Karuppan
- Ilavarasu
- M. S. Bhaskar
- S. N. Lakshmi
- Pyramid Natarajan as Sundara Pandian

== Production ==
The film marked the directorial debut of Amudhan, former associate of Thangar Bachan. The film stars Prasanna, in his second film, and newcomer Neelam Singh. The film was extensively shot in Gujarat and was set in the backdrop of the 2001 Gujarat earthquake. The team shot in the earthquake devastated village of Adhoi in Gujarat and became the first crew in fifty years to go there for a film shooting. A stage came where the crew had to seek police help to continue shooting due to crowd trouble. The filming was also held at Srinagar and Gulmarg locales, Gandhidham at Gujarat and Mahabalipuram.

== Soundtrack ==
Ragasiyamai

Soundtrack album by Karthik Raja
- Released: 25 July 2003
- Genre: Feature film soundtrack
- Language: Tamil
- Producer: Karthik Raja

Karthik Raja chronology
Three Roses (2002)	Ragasiyamai (2003)	Singara Chennai (2004)

The soundtrack of the film was composed by Karthik Raja.

Track-list
No.	Title	Lyrics	Singer(s)	Length
1.	"Raavodu Raava"	Na. Muthukumar	Tippu
2.	"Thevayilla Thevayilla"	Snehan	Tippu
3.	"Kadhal Manniley"	Snehan	Karthik Raja
4.	"Kangalum Kangalum"	Snehan	Bhavatharini, K. K
5.	"Oduthey Oduthey"	Na. Muthukumar	Shreya Ghoshal, Karthik Raja

== Reception ==
Ragasiyamai was released on 27 September 2003 alongside Three Roses and Winner. A critic from Chennai Online wrote that "The makers might as well have kept the film Ragasiyamaiy.. (transl. a secret) from the audience!". A critic from Sify wrote that "Ragasiyamai stars Five Star fame Prasanna and newcomer Neelam. It is yet another predictable story of two people falling in love, parental opposition, eloping, stunts, chases and a banal climax where everything ends on a happy note". A critic from The Hindu wrote that "The tense filled moments, when the hero and heroine are separated in the melee, redeem "Ragasiyamaai... " to some extent."
