= Vaanchinathan =

2001 film

- Poster
- Directed by: Shaji Kailas
- Written by: Liaquat Ali Khan
- Produced by: M. Kaja Mydeen
- Starring: Vijayakanth; Sakshi Shivanand; Ramya Krishnan; Prakash Raj
- Cinematography: S. Saravanan
- Edited by: L. Bhoominathan
- Music by: Karthik Raja (songs); Rajamani (score)
- Production company: Roja Combines
- Release date: 14 January 2001
- Running time: 163 minutes
- Country: India
- Language: Tamil

Vaanchinathan is a 2001 Indian Tamil-language action thriller directed by Shaji Kailas in his Tamil debut. The script was written by Liaquat Ali Khan. It stars Vijayakanth in the titular role with Sakshi Shivanand and Ramya Krishnan in the female leads and Prakash Raj. The film was released on 14 January 2001.

== Plot ==
Vanchinathan is a cop who has been transferred from Gujarat. Chidambaram is a media mogul who thrives on chaos and confusion, which will help him boost sales of his paper. Their enmity becomes personal when Chidambaram challenges Vanchinathan to arrest him when he cleverly commits a murder in broad daylight in front of Vanchinathan. After that, Vanchinathan kills two corrupt officers for assisting bad guys. In retaliation Chidambaram poisons Vanchinathan's sister. Thereby Vanchinathan shoots Chidambaram and blames it on Chidambaram' younger brother.

== Cast ==
- Vijayakanth as DCP Vanchinathan IPS
- Ramya Krishnan as Nandhini
- Sakshi Shivanand as Divya
- Prakash Raj as Chidambaram
- Visu as Chief minister (guest appearance)
- Manorama as Kalyani Rajasekar (guest appearance)
- Nassar as Babu Rao Patel
- Kalabhavan Mani as Maya
- Rajeev as Commissioner Venugopal
- Delhi Ganesh as Inspector Abdul Khader (Khader Bhai)
- Thyagu as Inspector Narayanan
- Thalaivasal Vijay
- Pyramid Natarajan as Varadharajan
- Anju Aravind as Saradha, Vanchinathan's younger sister
- Raj Kapoor as Inspector Raveendran
- Ali Khan as Amir Khan
- Mani C. Kappan as Mahesh Gupta
- Sethu Vinayagam as Director general of police
- Sriman as Siva
- Sonia as Varadharajan's daughter
- Sabitha Anand as Abdul Khader's wife
- K. K. Soundar
- Meesai Murugesan
- Sakthivel as Inspector Subramani
- Arulmani as Inspector Bharathi
- Sooriyan as Inspector Rajendran
- MLA Thangaraj as Politician
- Kousalya Senthamarai as Varadharajan's wife
- Priyanka as Abdul Khader's daughter
- Kalukkul Eeram Ramanathan as Car driver
- Besant Ravi as Terrorist
- Thalapathy Dinesh as Terrorist
- Bobby as Terrorist
- Kovai Senthil as Man with a petition
- Nirmala Periyasamy as Newsreader
- Alphonsa in a special appearance
- Bhanusri in a special appearance
- Subhash Dhankar as Terrorist

== Production ==
The team had initially agreed terms with Suresh Gopi to feature in a pivotal role, but his unavailability led to team casting Prakash Raj. Soundarya was to appear in the film, but later opted out for unknown reasons. Shilpa Shetty had also signed on to star in the film. Likewise, Nadhiya was expected to make a return to Tamil films through the project, but eventually went against doing so.

The film is named after the Indian independence fighter Vanchinathan. A fight scene involving Vijayakanth, Ramya Krishnan and rowdies was shot in a set erected at AVM studios. The song sequence, 'Amul Baby', was shot at New Zealand.

== Soundtrack ==
Music was composed by Karthik Raja, collaborating with Vijayakanth for the second time after Alexander. The background score was done by Rajamani who reused score from Malayalam film Narasimham (also directed by Shaji Kailas) in some scenes.

Song	Singers	Lyrics
Adi Rendu	P. Unnikrishnan, Bhavatharini	Na. Muthukumar
Amul Baby	Sujatha, Shaan	Snehan
Sirikkum Sirippil	Swarnalatha, Harish Raghavendra	Snehan
Muthamida Vendum	Harini, Srinivas	Snehan
Roja Vanna Roja	K. J. Yesudas	Muthu Vijayan

== Release and reception ==
Rajitha of Rediff.com wrote "But the masala is appetising and in the final analysis, that is all that counts". The Hindu wrote "Liyakath Ali Khan's story and screenplay are crisp and action-packed" and also noted " sequences remind you of the Parthiban starrer `Abhimanyu' or Vijayakanth's own Vallarasu". Krishna Chidambaram of Kalki praised the director for maintaining the tempo from the beginning to end while also praising the fury in abolishing bribery and corruption is perfectly reflected with seriousness but felt the film was directed unrealistically and called it average. Chennai Online wrote "The film is only sound and fury with no substance". Distributors who had bought the film had incurred heavy losses. Post-release it was rumoured that footage of two heroines have been deleted to reduce the timing which earned criticism.
