= Vellachi =

2013 Indian film by Velu Vishwanath

- Theatrical release poste
- Directed by: Velu Vishwanath
- Written by: Velu Vishwanath
- Produced by: Ambur K. Ananthan Naidu
- Starring: Pintu Pandu; Suchitra Unni
- Cinematography: Sai Natraj
- Edited by: Hari Palanivel
- Music by: Bhavatharini
- Production company: Geethalaya Movies
- Release date: 1 March 2013
- Country: India
- Language: Tamil

Vellachi (transl. Fair-skinned girl) is a 2013 Indian Tamil-language romance film written and directed by Velu Vishwanath. The film stars newcomers Pintu Pandu and Suchitra Unni. The music was composed by Bhavatharini with cinematography by Sai Natraj and editing by Hari Palanivel. The film released on 1 March 2013.

== Cast ==
- Pintu Pandu as Ganesh
- Suchitra Unni as Vellachi
- Ganja Karuppu
- Pandu
- Chevvazhai
- Krishnamoorthy
- Madhumaran
- E. Ramesh
- G. Yadeshwaran
- Theepetti Ganesan

== Production ==
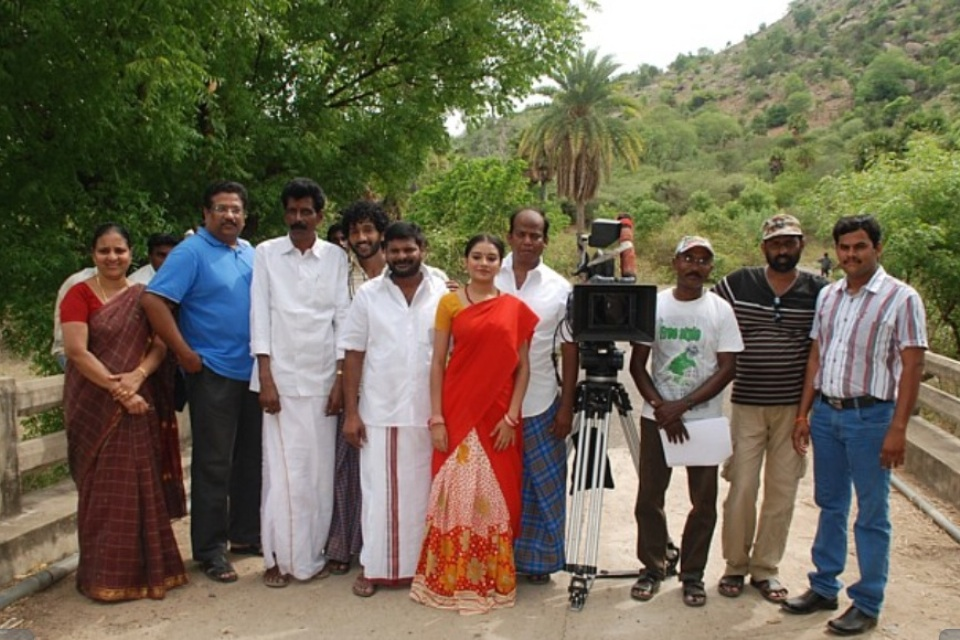
A still taken on the sets of Vellachi

Vellachi was written and directed by Velu Vishwanath, and produced by Ambur K. Ananthan Naidu under Geethalaya Movies. The film marked the acting debut of actor Pandu's son Pintu. Cinematography was handled by Sai Natraj. Principal photography began in June 2012, taking place in locations like Vellore, Vaniyambadi, Palamathi, Yelagiri, and Krishnagiri. As of December 2012, the film was in post-production.

== Soundtrack ==
Vellachi

Soundtrack album by Bhavatharini
- Released: 2013
- Genre: Feature film soundtrack
- Length: 17:19
- Producer: Bhavatharini

Bhavatharini chronology
Ilakkanam (2006)	Vellachi (2013)	Maayanadhi (2020)

The soundtrack was composed by Bhavatharini. It marked her return to music composing after Ilakkanam (2006).

No.	Title	Singer(s)	Length
1.	"Machango Mamango"	Velmurugan	3:47
2.	"Adi Sirukki"	Haricharan, Manikka Vinayagam	5:03
3.	"Poiya Pochey Enkadhal"	Yuvan Shankar Raja	4:17
4.	"Ennadi Penney"	M. L. R. Karthikeyan, Priya	4:12

== Release and reception ==
Vellachi was released on 1 March 2013. Maalai Malar wrote that though the opening scenes were moving slowly, the latter part of the story was fast-paced with love and conflict. The critic also appreciated Sai Natraj's cinematography, and the songs composed by Bhavatharini. Sidharth Varma from The Times of India wrote, "Tamil films with rural themes have helped several debutants make a mark, but sadly Vellachi does not work for comedian Pandu's son Pintu. For, the movie suffers from several inconsistencies in the script and pacing."
