= Enakkoru Magan Pirappan =

- VCD cover
- Directed by: Keyaar
- Screenplay by: Keyaar; N. Prasanna Kumar (dialogue)
- Produced by: Pyramid Natarajan
- Starring: Ramki; Khushbu; Vivek; Anju Aravind; Vadivukkarasi
- Cinematography: B. Lokeshwara Rao
- Edited by: R. T. Annadurai
- Music by: Karthik Raja
- Production company: Pyramid Films International
- Release date: 15 August 1996
- Running time: 150 minutes
- Country: India
- Language: Tamil

Enakkoru Magan Pirappan (transl. I will have a son) is a 1996 Indian Tamil-language comedy film directed by Keyaar and produced by Pyramid Natarajan. The film stars Ramki, Khushbu, Vivek, Anju Aravind and Vadivukkarasi. It was released on 15 August 1996.

== Plot ==
Ranganayaki, a rich woman, has three sons: Gopi, Madhu and Balu. She desperately wants a grandson and will pass on her whole inheritance to her son who has a male child. The elder sons have only daughters and Balu is still a bachelor.

Balu is a singer for marriage functions and he falls in love with Swathi, a girl from a middle-class family. He marries her and Swathi becomes pregnant. Balu's best friend, Raja, an honest journalist, is married to Shanthi and his wife is also pregnant. Swathi and Shanthi deliver babies on the same day. Balu has a daughter and Raja has a son.

In the meantime, Ranganayaki has a severe heart attack and the doctor prohibits revealing shocking news. In the hospital, a misunderstanding happens and Balu's father shows Raja's son to Ranganayaki in a serious condition. Ranganayaki immediately recovers. Balu maintains the lie to save his mother's life. What transpires next forms the rest of the story.

== Cast ==
- Ramki as Balu
- Khushbu as Swathi
- Vivek as Raja
- Anju Aravind as Shanthi
- Vadivukkarasi as Ranganayaki
- R. Sundarrajan as Sivaraman
- Senthil as Muthu
- Vennira Aadai Moorthy as Senapathi
- Vinu Chakravarthy as JK
- Chinni Jayanth as Madhu
- Pandu as Gopi
- Thyagu as Verghese

== Production ==
Pyramid Natarajan who faced losses after producing Love Birds, requested Keyaar to make a film for him within a short time. Anju Aravind was signed to portray a role in the film, anticipating that she would be paired opposite the actor Ramesh Aravind. However, the actor later pulled out and was replaced by the comedian Vivek. This was one of Vivek's earliest full-length supporting roles, as opposed to being restricted to the comedy subplot. The dialogues were written by N. Prasannakumar. Cinematography was handled by B. Lokeshwara Rao and editing by R. T. Annadurai. According to Keyaar, the filming was completed within 32 days.

== Soundtrack ==
The music was composed by Karthik Raja. It is his second film as a full-fledged composer.

Song	Singer(s)	Lyrics	Duration
"Aathu Mettulae"	P. Unnikrishnan, Sunandha	Arunmozhi	3:28
"En Raasi" (solo)	Sunandha	Arunmozhi	2:02
"En Raasi" (duet)	P. Unnikrishnan, Sujatha	Arunmozhi	3:06
"Chum Chum"	Bhavatharini, Karthik Raja	Arunmozhi	4:50
"Enthan Manam"	P. Jayachandran, Bhavatharini	Arunmozhi	4:54
"Poocharamai"	Mano, P. Jayachandran	Ilandevan	4:28

== Release and reception ==
Enakkoru Magan Pirappan was released on 15 August 1996, and played for 10 weeks in theatres. D. S. Ramanujam of The Hindu appreciated Keyaar for giving "new orientation to a theme which had been the issue for many earlier movies". He also appreciated the cast performances and Vivek's comedy but criticised the music. R. P. R. of Kalki praised the film's humour and said that it is unnecessary to find logic while calling Vivek's performance as lifeline for the film but panned the cinematography and editing. The character Verghese, portrayed by Thyagu, became popular in memes.
