= Thullura Vayasu =

- Directed by: Gopal
- Written by: Gopal
- Produced by: Gopal
- Starring: Raghava; Deepika
- Cinematography: Rajarajan
- Edited by: V. T. Havinash
- Music by: Karthik Raja
- Production company: KRC Film
- Release dates: 14 July 2006 (Original); 14 February 2007 (Re-release)
- Running time: 110 minutes
- Country: India
- Language: Tamil

Thullura Vayasu (transl. Exuberance of age) is a 2006 Tamil language romantic drama film produced and directed by Gopal. The film stars newcomers Raghava and Deepika, with newcomer Guhan, Kottai Perumal and Sharmili playing supporting roles. The film was released on 14 July 2006.

== Plot ==
The film begins with Raghavan (Raghava), who hails from Coimbatore, joining a medical college in Chennai as a first-year student. In his hostel, Raghavan starts to remember his school life and his first love.

Raghavan and Deepika (Deepika) studied in the same class and they were good friends. Raghavan hailed from a middle-class family while Deepika was from a rich family. Raghavan and Deepika then fell in love with each other but they didn't have the courage to convey their love. The last of school, Raghavan sneakily put a love letter in Deepika's book and Deepika did the same thing. Unfortunately, the two failed to read the love letters and thought that their love had failed. Thereafter, Vilvanathan (Guhan) gave Deepika sleeping pills and he convinced Raghav and his friends that she had committed suicide after failing her exam. The grief-stricken Raghav was unable to bear the constant reminders of his lover that his school and town were filled with. Raghavan's father then got a transfer to Delhi and Raghavan moved there but he failed to get a seat in any college in Delhi, so Raghav returned to Chennai to join a medical college.

Vilvanathan is hell-bent to save his family's prestige so he threatens his sister Deepika to kill her lover Raghavan if she is still in love with him. When Vilvanathan came to know of Raghavan's return, he sends henchmen to kill him and decides to send Deepika to study in the US. Raghavan is then stunned to encounter his lover Deepika alive and he successfully gets rid of Vilvanathan's henchmen. Finally, Vilvanathan arrives and beats Raghavan up. Deepika, who first begs her brother to spare him, encourages Raghavan to fight him back and Raghavan defeats him.

== Cast ==
- Raghava as Raghavan
- Deepika as Deepika
- Guhan as Vilvanathan
- Kottai Perumal
- Sharmili
- Vinoth as Saamy
- Saravanan
- Kannan
- Balu
- Kalaimani
- Sangili Murugan
- Noor Mohamed
- Manikandan
- Josri
- O. K. Natraj
- Kicha
- Hasina
- Chithra
- Rajeshwari
- Saranya Nag as Cherin
- Laksha in a special appearance

== Soundtrack ==
Thullura Vayasu

Soundtrack album by Karthik Raja
- Released: 2006
- Recorded: 2006
- Genre: Feature film soundtrack
- Length: 22:27
- Producer: Karthik Raja

Karthik Raja chronology
Naalai (2006)	Thullura Vayasu (2006)	Manathodu Mazhaikalam (2007)

The film score and the soundtrack were composed by Karthik Raja. The soundtrack, released in 2006, features 5 tracks with lyrics written by Na. Muthukumar and Gopal.

Track	Song	Singer(s)	Lyrics	Duration
1	"Kadal Pola"	Tippu	Gopal	4:43
2	"Mama Unakku"	Karthik Raja, Chitra Sivaraman	Gopal	4:00
3	"Thullura Vayasu"	Karthik	Na. Muthukumar	4:17
4	"Yetho Yetho" (male)	Karthik	Gopal	4:41
5	"Yetho Yetho" (female)	Sujatha	Gopal	4:41

== Release ==
Initially, the film had its release date fixed on 10 February 2006, but it was released on 14 July 2006. Cinesouth wrote "In spite of objectionable dialogues and scenes that hurt the senses, how the film managed to get a 'U' certificate from the Censors is beyond comprehension". Chennai Online wrote "With the scenario such as this and with the lead pair in no way providing aesthetic relief, either in their screen presence or in performance, it's one tragic time for the viewer".

After the poor response of the film, the film director Gopal planned to re-release the film. Thullura Vayasu, which was rechristened as Idhayam Unakkaga and released, has been given the original name again. Certain portions of the film were re-shot in accordance with the audience's feedback. The director also sought the views of the film going public on the title, and since many felt that Thullura Vayasu suited the film better, the director Gopal has now decided to retain the title as Thullura Vayasu. It was re-released on 14 February 2007.
