= Album (2002 film) =

2002 film by Vasanthabalan

- DVD cover
- Directed by: G. Vasanthabalan
- Written by: S. Ramakrishnan (Dialogues)
- Screenplay by: G. Vasanthabalan
- Story by: G. Vasanthabalan
- Produced by: Rajam Balachander; Pushpa Kandaswamy
- Starring: Aryan Rajesh; Shrutika
- Cinematography: Bharani K. Dharan
- Edited by: V. T. Vijayan
- Music by: Karthik Raja
- Production company: Kavithalayaa Productions
- Release date: 4 October 2002
- Country: India
- Language: Tamil

Album is a 2002 Indian Tamil-language romantic drama film written and directed by G. Vasanthabalan, starring newcomer Rajesh and Shrutika. The story portrays the love and affection between two families. The film, produced by Kavithalayaa Productions, was Vasanthabalan's directorial debut and became a box office failure. It is however best known for featuring the popular chartbuster track "Chellame Chellam" from Karthik Raja's soundtrack to the film, which was Shreya Ghoshal's first song in Tamil.

== Plot ==
The film revolves around Jeeva and Viji's families, who are neighbours. Viji falls in love with Jeeva. How they overcome their hurdles and unite forms the story.

== Cast ==
- Aryan Rajesh as Jeeva (credited as Rajesh; voice dubbed by Deepak Dinkar)
- Shrutika as Viji (voice dubbed by Renuka Kathir)
- Saritha as Shantha, Jeeva's mother
- Prakash Raj as Jamun fruit seller
- Vijayakumar as Somu, Viji's father
- Balachandra Menon as Ranganathan, Jeeva's father
- Nizhalgal Ravi as Viji's uncle
- Karunas as Paal Pandi
- Stun Siva as Karikkol
- Hemalatha as Geetha, Jeeva's sister
- Reshmi as Viji's sister
- Neelima Rani as Viji's sister
- Kovai Senthil
- Muthukaalai as Ganesa

== Soundtrack ==
The soundtrack was composed by Karthik Raja. The song "Chellame Chellam" became popular and emerged a chartbuster. It was notably the first Tamil song rendered by Shreya Ghoshal for a Tamil film soundtrack.

Track listing
| No. | Title | Lyrics | Singer(s) | Length |
|---|---|---|---|---|
| 1. | "Thathalikudhey" | Paarthi Bhaskar | Karthik, Sadhana Sargam, Tippu | 5:12 |
| 2. | "Chellame Chellam" | Na. Muthukumar | Hariharan, Shreya Ghoshal | 5:13 |
| 3. | "Kadhal Vanoli" | Na. Muthukumar | Harish Raghavendra, Sujatha | 6:18 |
| 4. | "Muttaikull" | Na. Muthukumar | Bhavatharini, Chorus | 2:03 |
| 5. | "Pillai Thamarai" | Kabilan | Madhu Balakrishnan | 5:18 |
| 6. | "Thaazhampoo" | Na. Muthukumar | Ilaiyaraaja, Sadhana Sargam | 4:47 |
| 7. | "Nilave Nilave" | Thamarai | Tippu, Shankar Mahadevan, Chorus | 5:19 |
| Total length: | | | | 34:10 |

== Critical reception ==
Malathi Rangarajan of The Hindu opined, "Acting to avoid a contrived storyline and melodrama is fine. But then, in a film, something has to keep happening for the tempo to be sustained". Malini Mannath of Chennai Online wrote, "It's a bland affair, where you wait for something to happen. Like, a twist or a turn, or some conflict. And then you keep waiting and waiting, till you realise that there's no more wait since the film has come to an end". Cinesouth wrote, "The crawling pace that the film maintains from the beginning till the very end irritates the viewer. For such a simple story, the screenplay shouldnt have been so simple too. For that very reason, you could say that 'Album' has nothing more to offer except that one song and some realistic scenes".
