= Karthik Raja =

Indian composer and playback singer (born 1973)

- Born: 29 June 1973 (age 53)
- Origin: Tamil Nadu, India
- Education: Trinity Laban (Piano)
- Occupations: Composer; Playback singer
- Years active: 1992–present
- Spouse: Raja Rajeswari (m. 2000)

Karthik Raja (born 29 June 1973) is an Indian composer and playback singer, who predominantly works in Tamil films, apart from a few Hindi films. He made his debut as a film composer in the film Pandiyan (1992) and is predominantely and known for his work in the late 1990s and early 2000s.

== Personal life ==
Karthik Raja is the eldest son of music composer Illayaraja. His brother Yuvan Shankar Raja and sister Bhavatharini, also Tamil film music directors and playback singers, have worked with him on notable projects. He was schooled at St. Bede's School and Boston Matriculation higher secondary school in Chennai. On 8 June 2000, Karthik Raja married Raja Rajeshwari at Tirupati, Andhra Pradesh, India.

== Career ==
Born to a family of musicians, Raja had exposure to various kinds of music from a very early age. He had his formal training in Western classical music from the Trinity School of Music, mainly in piano (affiliated with Jacob John). He also had training in Carnatic music from T. V. Gopalakrishnan and Malayalam composer, V. Dakshinamoorthy.

As a child, Raja often used to accompany his father to the recording studios. At the age of 13, Karthik Raja played the keyboard for the song Kannukkum from the Tamil movie Ninaikka Therinda Maname (1987). Many such outings followed including playing keyboard for the soundtrack of the movie Nayakan. Karthik also arranged many recordings for his father and composed his first song "Pandianin Rajiyathil" for the movie Pandiyan (1992) and "Ninaikindra" for the movie Athma (1993). Around this time, he also composed some background scores for the TV series Bible.

Raja debuted as a fully-fledged composer in 1996 through the Tamil movie Alexander, soon followed by Manikkam. Then came many chart-busters that included Ullaasam, Naam Iruvar Nammaku Iruvar, Kadhala Kadhala and Dumm Dumm Dumm among others. He also debuted in Hindi films with Grahan which won him the R.D. Burman award for the best new talent.

== Discography ==
=== Tamil films ===
Year	Title	Score	Songs	Other notes
1992	Pandiyan	No	Yes	1 song; uncredited
1993	Uzhaippali	Yes	No	
1993	Ponnumani	Yes	Yes	1 song; uncredited
1993	Dharmaseelan	Yes	No	Uncredited
1993	Sakkarai Devan	Yes	No	Uncredited
1993	Aathma	No	Yes	"Ninaikkindra Paadhaiyil" song; uncredited
1994	Amaidhi Padai	Yes	No	
1994	Raasamagan	Yes	No	
1994	Kanmani	No	Yes	"Netru Vandha Kaatru" song; uncredited
1996	Enakkoru Magan Pirappan	Yes	Yes	
1996	Manikkam	Yes	Yes	
1996	Alexander	Yes	Yes	
1997	Ullaasam	Yes	Yes	
1998	Naam Iruvar Nammaku Iruvar	Yes	Yes	
1998	Kadhala Kadhala	Yes	Yes	
2001	Vaanchinathan	Yes	Yes	
2001	Ullam Kollai Poguthae	Yes	Yes	
2001	Dumm Dumm Dumm	Yes	Yes	
2002	Album	Yes	Yes	
2002	Three Roses	Yes	Yes	
2003	Pudhiya Geethai	Yes	No	
2003	Inii	Yes	Yes	Short film
2003	Ragasiyamai	Yes	Yes	
2004	Singara Chennai	Yes	Yes	
2004	Kudaikul Mazhai	Yes	Yes	
2005	Rightaa Thappaa	Yes	Yes	
2005	Neranja Manasu	Yes	Yes	
2006	Mercury Pookkal	No	Yes	
2006	Naalai	Yes	Yes	
2006	Thullura Vayasu	Yes	Yes	
2007	Manathodu Mazhaikalam	Yes	Yes	
2007	Murugaa	Yes	Yes	
2007	Oru Ponnu Oru Paiyan	Yes	Yes	25th Film
2007	Maa Madurai	Yes	Yes	
2008	Chakkara Viyugam	Yes	Yes	
2009	Achamundu Achamundu	Yes	Yes	
2009	Kudiyarasu	Yes	Yes	
2010	Rettaisuzhi	Yes	Yes	
2012	Veyilodu Vilayadu	Yes	Yes	Film unreleased
2014	Vaaraayo Vennilaave	Yes	Yes	Film unreleased
2014	Aranmanai	Yes	No	
2015	Sagaptham	Yes	Yes	
2016	Avan Aval	Yes	Yes	
2016	Dhilluku Dhuddu	Yes	No	
2017	Pagadi Aattam	Yes	Yes	
2018	Padaiveeran	Yes	Yes	
2021	Aatkal Thevai	Yes	Yes	
2021	Maadathy	Yes	Yes	
2021	Chidambaram Railway Gate	Yes	Yes	
2023	Web	Yes	Yes	
2023	Mathimaran	Yes	Yes	
2024	Bujji at Anupatti	Yes	Yes	
2026	Vengeance	No	Yes	
TBA	Pisasu 2	Yes	Yes	

=== Other language films ===
Year	Title	Score	Songs	Language	Notes
1997	Grahan	Yes	Yes	Hindi	Audio released in 1997 but the film was released in 2001; Winner, Filmfare RD Burman Award for New Music Talent
2000	Hoo Anthiya Uhoo Anthiya	Yes	Yes	Kannada	
2001	Hum Ho Gaye Aapke	Yes	No	Hindi	
2002	Mitr, My Friend	Yes	Yes	English; Hindi	Composed "Give Me Hugs" and played keyboard for "Ehsaas"
2002	16 December	Yes	Yes	Hindi	
2008	Mukhbiir	No	Yes	Hindi	2 songs
2009	Anything For You	Yes	Yes	English	
2010	Zamana	Yes	Yes	Kannada	
2012	Tuneega Tuneega	Yes	Yes	Telugu	
2012	Yuganiki Okka Premikudu	Yes	Yes	Telugu	
2014	Rajadhi Raja	No	Yes	Malayalam	2 songs

=== As playback singer ===
Year	Title	Song	Composer	Other notes
1990	Anjali	"Something Something", "Iravu Nilavu", "Motta Maadi", "Vaanam Namakku", "Anjali Anjali"	Ilayaraja	
1996	Enakkoru Magan Pirappan	"Cham Cham"	himself	
1996	Alexander	"Koothadichu"	himself	
1997	Devathai	"Enge En Kaadhali"	Ilayaraja	
1997	Ullaasam	"Ullasam", "Vaalibam Vaazhthu"	himself	
1998	Kaathala Kaathala	"Saravana Bhava"	himself	
2001	Ullam Kollai Poguthae	"Kathavai Naan", "Adada Adada"	himself	
2003	Ragasiyamai	"Kadhal Mannile","Oduthe"	himself	
2004	Neranja Manasu	"Tharisa Kedakkura"	himself	
2005	Rightaa Thappaa	"Ilamai Enbathu"	himself	
2006	Mercury Pookkal	"Solla Vaarthaigal"	himself	
2006	Thullura Vayasu	"Mama Unakku"	himself	
2006	Manathodu Mazhaikalam	"Pani Vizhum Kaalam"	himself	
2007	Oru Ponnu Oru Paiyan	"Nenjil"	himself	
2008	Chakkara Viyugam	"Idyatha Kaanam", "Padaithal Kadhal", "Yei Unnidam"	himself	
2009	Kudiyarasu	"Idhu Enna"	himself	
2010	Goa	"Yezhezhu Thalamuraikkum"	Yuvan Shankar Raja	
2012	Kazhugu	"Aathadi Manasuthan"	Yuvan Shankar Raja	
2014	Vanavarayan Vallavarayan	"Kongu Naatu Thendralukkum"	Yuvan Shankar Raja	

=== Albums ===
Year	Album	Language	Notes
1997	Meri Jaan Hindustan	Hindi	One track
2000	Split Wide Open – Album	Hindi	One track
2000	Kaathalai Gauravikkum Neram	Tamil	
2000	India Unlimited	Hindi	
2000	Haule Haule	Hindi	Three tracks
2012	Srivilliputtur Andal	Tamil	12 Tracks

== Television ==
Year	Name of Television Show	Role	Network
2024	Sa Re Ga Ma Pa Seniors 4	Guest	Zee Tamil

== Awards ==
- 1998: Filmfare RD Burman Award for New Music Talent – Grahan
- 2001: Cinema Express Award for Best Music Director – Dumm Dumm Dumm
