= Neranja Manasu =

2004 film by Samuthirakani

- Theatrical release poster
- Directed by: P. Samuthirakani
- Written by: P. Samuthirakani; C. Balasubramani
- Produced by: V. Gnanavel; Jayaprakash
- Starring: Vijayakanth; Susan
- Cinematography: V. Prathap
- Edited by: Anil Malnad
- Music by: Karthik Raja
- Production company: GJ Cinema
- Release date: 11 November 2004
- Running time: 150 minutes
- Country: India
- Language: Tamil

Neranja Manasu (transl. Brimming heart) is a 2004 Indian Tamil-language action drama film written and directed by P. Samuthirakani. It stars Vijayakanth and newcomer Susan. The music is composed by Karthik Raja, while cinematography is by V. Prathap and editing by Anil Malnad.

Neranja Manasu was released on 11 November 2004, and did not perform well at the box office.

== Plot ==
In Suryakudi, a village in Madurai district, the people stole from neighbouring villages and made a living. The local administration had washed their hands off this hell hole. One day, the thief Irulaiah escaped from the police and left his pregnant wife. Many years later, Irulaiah returned to his village with his new wife and daughter Irulayi. His son Sivanandi killed him to steal his money and his wife died while trying to save him. His cousin Ayyanar, who witnessed it, informed the police and Sivanandi was arrested.

20 years later, Ayyanar is a good samaritan who tries his best to improve the living of the villagers and he is highly respected by his peers. After being released from jail, a vengeful Sivanandi returns to his village and wants to kill his cousin Ayyanar. Meanwhile, Irulayi who is in love with Ayyanar tries to woo him and the new village doctor also likes him.

The village woman Thavamani finds out that the funds meant for the development of the village are being shared by the local bureaucracy led by revenue divisional officer Thirumalaisamy and informs Ayyanar. Thirumalaisamy then murders the innocent Thavamani and a vengeful Ayyanar kills him. Inspector Adithya inquiries the villagers about the murder at the police station and knows that Ayyanar is the culprit. A short-tempered Ayyanar slaps Adithya for threatening the village women and a villager sets the police station on fire and Adithya is disfigured. Later, Sivanandi asks his friend Masanam to marry his sister Irulayi but Ayyanar comes to her rescue and beats up Masanam.

Sivanandi joins hands with Masanam and Adithya to kill Ayyanar. During a fight, Sivanandi is frustrated for not being able to kill Ayyanar and Ayyanar convinces him to become a good man thus Sivanandi has a change of heart. Ayyanar then beats up Masanam and Adithya. The film ends with the collector Venkatraman announcing that the funds will be given to the villagers.

== Cast ==
- Vijayakanth as Ayyanar
- Susan as Irulayi
- Mahima as Doctor
- Nassar as Venkatraman
- Manorama as Ayyanar's grandmother
- Ammukutty Pushpamala as Sivanandi's grandmother
- Vinu Chakravarthy as Ayyanar's grandfather
- Senthil as Ayyanar's uncle
- Ilavarasu as Poochi
- Sampath Raj as Sivanandi and Irulaiah
- Venkat Prabhu as Machakaalai
- Mansoor Ali Khan as Masanam
- Adithya Menon as Inspector Adithya
- M. S. Bhaskar as Nariyan
- Muthukaalai as Bodaisamy
- Pyramid Natarajan as Thirumalaisamy
- Singamuthu as Villager
- Peeli Sivam as Superintendent of police
- John Amirtharaj as Government employee
- Daniel Lambert as Kutty
- Pasi Sathya as Thavamani's mother
- Mangai as Thavamani
- Kalpanasri as Sivanandi's wife
- Sriranjani as Poochi's wife
- Srilatha as Irulayi's mother
- Sindhu as Sivanandi's mother
- Gowthami Vembunathan as Gajalakshmi
- Poraali Dileepan as Photographer
- Nanditha Jennifer in a special appearance
- Samuthirakani as villager (cameo appearance)

== Production ==
After securing Vijayakanth's dates, the producers at GJ Cinema first approached Ramana to direct the film. Ramana finalised a script titled Parthasarathy, but the makers opted to change their choice of director to N. Lingusamy, who also later opted out. P. Samuthirakani later took on the responsibility, using a different script. Sampath Raj appeared in his first acting role and portrayed two different characters. The film was largely shot in Kadappadi, a village near Pollachi.

== Soundtrack ==
Music was composed by Karthik Raja and released on Mass Audios. Halitha Shameem worked on some lyrics for the film but her contributions were later not included.

Track listing
No.	Title	Lyrics	Singer(s)	Length
1.	"Kelappu Kelappu"	Kalai Kumar	Tippu	4:44
2.	"Muthukulichi"	Pa. Vijay	P. Unnikrishnan, Manjari	5:22
3.	"Naadum"	C. Balasubramani	Sriram Parthasarathy	2:03
4.	"Paarthu Po"	Na. Muthukumar	Shreya Ghoshal	5:02
5.	"Tharisa Kedakura" (Male)	Snehan	Karthik Raja	5:14
6.	"Tharisa Kedakura" (Female)	Snehan	Manjari	5:12
7.	"Vatta Karuppatti"	Na. Muthukumar	Ranjith, Aishwarya	5:11
Total length:				32:48

== Release and reception ==
Neranja Manasu was released on 11 November 2004, during the week of Diwali.

S. R. Ashok Kumar of The Hindu opined that "Though the storyline is run-of-the-mill, the treatment and screenplay are worth a mention". Malini Mannath of Chennai Online wrote "Samudrakani who gave us a classy, slightly different film in his debut 'Unnai Saran Adainthen', prefers to tread the safe path here. It's an old storyline, an old style of presentation, too many loose ends, and unexplained scenes". Visual Dasan of Kalki wrote Balasubramaniam's story that had potential to be realistic and documentary kind of village film has been changed colours for Vijayakanth and also felt the writer seems to have confused about the timeline however the screenplay without slackness can be forgiven for it and particularly praised Sampath's performance as antagonist. Sify wrote "Director Samudrakani who showed some promise in his debut film plods as his script goes haywire and becomes bewilderingly bad as he is not able to tell the story that he wanted to say". Music India Online wrote "D.Balasubramaniam’s story and the dialogue may fit certain villages. But the fact that Samuthrakani also had considered Vijaykanth as ‘God’ like and ‘too big a personality’ had also treated the story in the same vein. Because of this he didn’t bothered to detect a very big hole in the screenplay. This may be due to satisfy the ‘Bigman’". The film did not perform well commercially.

Samuthirakani later cast both the film's producers Jayaprakash and Gnanavel in his later films.
