= Na. Muthukumar =

Indian writer and lyricist

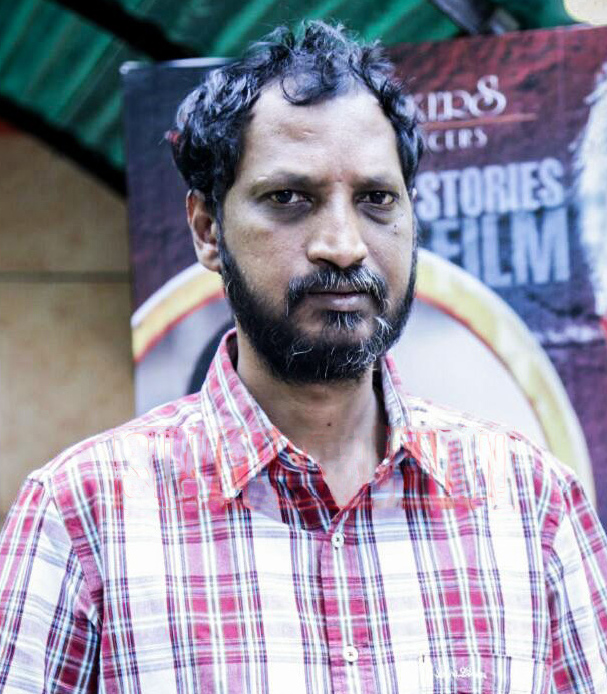
- Muthukumar at Touring Talkies Audio Launch
- Born: Nagarajan Muthukumar; 13 July 1975; Kannikapuram, Kanchipuram, Tamil Nadu, India
- Died: August 14, 2016 (aged 41); Chennai, India
- Occupations: Poet; lyricist; writer; novelist
- Spouse: Jeevalakshmi Muthukumar (2006-2016)
- Children: 2
- Writing career
- Pen name: Munaivar
- Period: 1999–2016
- Notable awards: Kalaimamani Award (2006)

Nagarajan Muthukumar (13 July 1975 – 14 August 2016) was an Indian poet, lyricist, and author who predominantly worked in Tamil language film songs. He was known for his frequent collaborations with composers Yuvan Shankar Raja, G. V. Prakash Kumar and Harris Jayaraj.

Muthukumar received the most Filmfare Awards for Best Lyricist in Tamil and was a two-time recipient of the National Film Award for Best Lyrics for his works in Thanga Meenkal (2013) and Saivam (2014). He won two National Film Awards, four Tamil Nadu State Film Awards, and four Filmfare Awards South.

== Early life ==
Muthukumar grew up in Kannikapuram village in Kancheepuram, India in a middle-class family. He has a brother Ramesh Kumar. At the age of four, he lost his mother. At a young age, he acquired an interest in reading.

== Career ==
He began his career working under Balu Mahendra for four years. He was later offered to write lyrics in the film Veera Nadai, directed by Seeman. He has been credited as a dialogue writer in a few films, including Kireedam (2007) and Vaaranam Aayiram (2008). His last movie as lyricist is Sarvam Thaala Mayam with A. R. Rahman.

== Personal life ==
Na. Muthukumar was born at Kannikapuram, Kancheepuram on 13 July 1975. He did his graduation in Physics at Kancheepuram Pachaippa college. He pursued his master's degree in Tamil at Chennai Pachaippa college. With the aim of becoming a director, he joined as an assistant director to the legendary Balumahendra. His Poem 'Thoor' took him to great heights.

On 14 June 2006, he married Jeevalakshmi in Vadapalani, Chennai.

== Health issues and death ==
Muthukumar, who had been suffering from jaundice for a long time, died on the morning of 14 August 2016, at his Chennai residence of cardiac arrest. He is survived by his wife, son and daughter.

== Filmography ==
=== Lyricist ===
| Year | Film | Song(s) |
|---|---|---|
| 1999 | Malabar Police | Hollywood Mudhal |
| 1999 | Minsara Kanna | Oh Uncle |
| 1999 | Hello | Salaam Gulamu |
| 1999 | Maanaseega Kadhal | Anandha Katre & Kandha Kadamba |
| 1999 | Ooty | Oh Lilly & Oh Vennila |
| 1999 | Iraniyan | Chandirane Satchi & En Maaman Madurai |
| 1999 | Unnaruge Naan Irundhal | Chinna Chinna Poove |
| 2000 | Vaanathaippola | Thavaniye Ennai Mayakiriye |
| 2000 | Eazhaiyin Sirippil | Sakkaravalli |
| 2000 | Athey Manithan | Idiyappam |
| 2000 | James Pandu | Kannena Minsaram |
| 2000 | Veeranadai | Kaalaiyile & Muthu Mutha |
| 2000 | Sabhash | Thank You & Ulagai Suttri |
| 2001 | Vaanchinathan | Adi Rendu |
| 2001 | Dumm Dumm Dumm | Desingu Raja, Suttrum Bhoomi, Un Perai Sonnale, Ragasiyamai |
| 2001 | Kalakalappu | Amrutha Kadalae |
| 2001 | Nandhaa | Or Aayiram Yaanai |
| 2001 | Love Marriage | Kannaale Kollaathe & Keeravani |
| 2002 | Vivaramana Aalu | Adiye Aaravalli & Yei Maamaa |
| 2002 | Unnai Ninaithu | Chocklet Chocklet |
| 2002 | Ivan | Thoolu Thoolu |
| 2002 | Run | Theradi Veethiyile |
| 2002 | Samasthanam | Penne Penne |
| 2002 | Album | Chellame Chellam, Kadhal Vanoli, Muttaikul & Thazhampoo |
| 2002 | Bagavathi | Saiyo Saiyo |
| 2002 | April Maadhathil | Kanavugal Pookum |
| 2003 | Dhool | Koduvaa Meesai |
| 2003 | Vaseegara | Oru Thadavai, Poopola Theepola & Venaam Venaam |
| 2003 | Anbu | Manaponnu Azhaga |
| 2003 | Julie Ganapathi | Enaku Piditha Paadal |
| 2003 | Student Number 1 | Vizhamale Irukka Mudiyuma, Na Azhukkanalum Amsa, Un Kutramaa, Enge Sellum, Salute Podu, College Canteen & Kadalora Kavithye |
| 2003 | Military | Chittu Kuruvi |
| 2003 | Sena | Naattukozhi Kulambu |
| 2003 | Well Done | Indhiya Meppai |
| 2003 | Anbe Anbe | Malayala Karaiyoram & Rettai Jadai Rakkamma |
| 2003 | Saamy | Thirunelveli Halwada, Pudichirukku & Veppamaram |
| 2003 | Jayam (2003 film) | Vandi Vandi & Thiruvizhanu vantha |
| 2003 | Parthiban Kanavu | Theeradha Dum |
| 2003 | Kaadhal Kondein | Devathaiyai Kandaen, Thottu Thottu & 18 Vayathil |
| 2003 | Whistle | Whistle Adikkum Vadhana |
| 2003 | Aahaa Ethanai Azhagu | Aattukutty Ellam |
| 2003 | Kadhal Kisu Kisu | Aalum Velum & Adadaa |
| 2003 | Eera Nilam | Megam Karukuthu |
| 2003 | Thennavan | Vinodhane |
| 2003 | Diwan | Oru Thaalaattu |
| 2003 | Thiruda Thirudi | Ayurveda Azhagi |
| 2003 | Ragasiyamai | Raavodu Raava & Oliyuthe Oliyuthe |
| 2003 | Thirumalai | Thaamthakka Dheemthakka |
| 2003 | Pithamagan | Kodi Yethi Veippom |
| 2003 | Joot | Aadivarum Azhagiya & Kattabomma Kattabomma |
| 2003 | Indru | Ponmaalai, Shokka Pakkura & Salwar Poovanam |
| 2004 | Kovil | Collegikku |
| 2004 | Pudhukottaiyilirundhu Saravanan | Pudhukottai Saravanan |
| 2004 | Thendral | Pachai Kili |
| 2004 | Varnajalam | Matha Matha |
| 2004 | Ghilli | Soora Thenga |
| 2004 | Aethirree | Podu Nanba Sakkai |
| 2004 | Arul | Ukkadathu Papadame & Punnakunnu |
| 2004 | Jore | Jore Bada Jore & Mummy Chellama |
| 2004 | Singara Chennai | Kabul Desathu & Sennagunni |
| 2004 | Sullan | Sandakozhi |
| 2004 | Kudaikul Mazhai | Enga Poi Solluven, Oru Kottaikul & Pada Pada Vena |
| 2004 | Arasatchi | Ippadiye Vittu Vidu |
| 2004 | Giri | Adra Sakkai, Rendu Kaaluda & Oppanakara Veethiyila |
| 2004 | M. Kumaran S/O Mahalakshmi | Chennai Senthamizh |
| 2004 | Bose | Nijama Nijama |
| 2004 | 7G Rainbow Colony | All Songs |
| 2004 | Chatrapathy | Ore Oru Raathirikku |
| 2004 | Manmadhan | Vanamenna & Kadhal Valarthen |
| 2004 | Neranja Manasu | Paarthu Poo & Vatta Karupatti |
| 2004 | Kaadhal | All Songs |
| 2005 | Ayya | Athiri Pathiri, Ayyathorai (Sad) & Thenam Ayyanu |
| 2005 | Devathaiyai Kanden | Maama Paiyya |
| 2005 | Ji | Thiruttu Rascal |
| 2005 | Mannin Maindhan | Idhu Ladies Hostel |
| 2005 | Maayavi | Kaathadi Pole |
| 2005 | London | Kee Mu Kee Pee |
| 2005 | Thaka Thimi Tha | Etha Oothi Senjeno, Rayalaseema Rani & Sulukki Sulukkedukkum |
| 2005 | Chandramukhi | Kokku Para Para |
| 2005 | Sachein | Kanmoodi Thirakumpothe |
| 2005 | Jithan | Coimbatore Ponnu |
| 2005 | Anniyan | Kadhal Yaanai |
| 2005 | Englishkaran | All Songs |
| 2005 | February 14 | Laila Majnu |
| 2005 | ABCD | Yaar Potta Kolam |
| 2005 | Andha Naal Nyabagam | Success Success |
| 2005 | Thotti Jaya | Acchu Vellam & Thotta Power Da |
| 2005 | Ghajini | Suttum Vizhi |
| 2005 | Anbe Vaa | Kaal Koluse, Loyola & Olib Laila |
| 2005 | Aanai | Figurudan Oru Naal |
| 2005 | Oru Kalluriyin Kathai | All songs |
| 2005 | Kasthuri Maan | Nethu Varaikkum |
| 2005 | Adhu Oru Kana Kaalam | Unnale Thookam |
| 2005 | Aaru | Soda Bottle, Paakathe, Freeya Vudu, Nenjam Ennumm & Dhrogam |
| 2005 | Sandakozhi | Ennamo Nadakkirathe & Gumthalakkadi Gana |
| 2006 | Paramasivan | Aasai Dosai |
| 2006 | Saravana | Saa Poo Three Pottu |
| 2006 | Dishyum | Kitta Neringivaadi |
| 2006 | Kalvanin Kadhali | Eno Kangal |
| 2006 | Thambi | Kanavaa Endru, En Kadhal, Poovanathil Maram & Ennamma Devi Jakkamma |
| 2006 | Kovai Brothers | All Songs |
| 2006 | Azhagai Irukkirai Bayamai Irukkirathu | Elaiyudhir Kaalam & Kaadhalai Pirippadhu |
| 2006 | Madhu | Dum Irundha Munnale & Ketkavillaya |
| 2006 | Thalai Nagaram | Yedho Ninaikiren & Madi Madi |
| 2006 | Pudhupettai | All Songs |
| 2006 | Parijatham | Unnai Kandane |
| 2006 | Naalai | All Songs |
| 2006 | Thullura Vayasu | Thullura Vayasu |
| 2006 | Aacharya | All Songs |
| 2006 | Thodamale | Thottu Thottu & Vennilavey |
| 2006 | Unakkum Enakkum | Aagayam Ithana Naal, Kiliye Kiliye & Pooparikka Neeyum |
| 2006 | Thimiru | Maana Madurai & Thithikkara Vayasu |
| 2006 | Em Magan | Kalluri Generation |
| 2006 | Jambhavan | Pana Marathula |
| 2006 | Manathodu Mazhaikalam | All Songs |
| 2006 | E | Kadhal Enbathu |
| 2006 | Nenjirukkum Varai | Kadhaliye & Pudichirukku |
| 2006 | Thiruvilaiyaadal Aarambam | Kannukul Yedho |
| 2006 | Veyil | All Songs except 'Sethavadam' |
| 2006 | Kumaran | Go Go Azhago & Sorgathil Pookkum |
| 2007 | Pokkiri | Vasantha Mullai |
| 2007 | Thaamirabharani | All Songs except Thaaliyae Thevaiyillai |
| 2007 | Deepavali | Dolu Baje, Kadhal Vaithu & Pogadhey Pogadhey |
| 2007 | Muruga | All Songs |
| 2007 | Sabari | All Songs except 'Osama Osama' |
| 2007 | Manikanda | Hey Mukundha, Inji Murappa & Mama Mama |
| 2007 | Parattai Engira Azhagu Sundaram | Engeda Azhagundhan, Adithadi, Ezezhu Jenmam & Aaru Padai Veedu |
| 2007 | Thiru Ranga | Maduraveera, Ennai Yetho & Thagathimi |
| 2007 | Nee Naan Nila | Darling O Darling, En Kadhal Deiva & Unnai Sandhithaen |
| 2007 | Sivaji | Balleilakka |
| 2007 | Viyabari | Vetriyai Kandavan |
| 2007 | Kireedam | All Songs |
| 2007 | Pallikoodam | Indha Nimidam |
| 2007 | Oru Ponnu Oru Paiyan | Malargale & Oru Ponnu |
| 2007 | Satham Podathey | All Songs |
| 2007 | Piragu | Mudhalil Santhithen & Amma Appa |
| 2007 | Malaikottai | Kantha Kadamba |
| 2007 | Kattradhu Thamizh | All Songs |
| 2007 | Azhagiya Tamil Magan | Valayapatti Thavile |
| 2007 | Polladhavan | Minnalgall Koothadum |
| 2007 | Vel | Indha Ooril, Unnapola, Aayiram Jannal, Kovakkara Kiliye |
| 2007 | Oram Po | All songs except 'Oram Po Theme' |
| 2007 | Evano Oruvan | Unathu Enathu |
| 2007 | Kalloori | All Songs |
| 2007 | Puli Varudhu | All Songs |
| 2008 | Bheemaa | Mudhal Mazhai |
| 2008 | Jodhaa Akbar | All Songs |
| 2008 | Vaazhthugal | All Songs |
| 2008 | Velli Thirai | Uyirile En Uyirile |
| 2008 | Sandai | Pokkirina Vijay Da & Aathadi |
| 2008 | Tharagu | Poda Poda |
| 2008 | Yaaradi Nee Mohini | All Songs |
| 2008 | Santosh Subramaniam | Adada Adada & Uyire Uyire Piriyathey |
| 2008 | Arai En 305-il Kadavul | Kaadhal Sei |
| 2008 | Kuruvi | Happy New Year & Kuruvi Kuruvi |
| 2008 | Pandi | Un Kangal |
| 2008 | Uliyin Osai | Kaalathai Vendra |
| 2008 | Dhaam Dhoom | Aazhiyilae & Anbe En Anbe |
| 2008 | Jayamkondaan | Sutrivarum Boomi |
| 2008 | Poi Solla Porom | All Songs |
| 2008 | Sakkarakatti | Taxi Taxi & Elay |
| 2008 | Seval | Kannamma Kannamma, Namma Ooru Nallaarukku, Odamarathu Mullapola & Paarvaile Oru Yekkam |
| 2008 | Vaaranam Aayiram | Yethi Yethi |
| 2008 | Thenavattu | All Songs |
| 2008 | Mahesh, Saranya Matrum Palar | Katrae Katrae |
| 2008 | Silambattam | Machaan Machaan |
| 2008 | Naan Aval Adhu | All songs except "Kadhal Oru Kaatru" |
| 2009 | Kadhalna Summa Illai | Ennamo Seidhai & Samayame |
| 2009 | Siva Manasula Sakthi | All Songs |
| 2009 | TN 07 AL 4777 | Iphone & Kanneerai Pole |
| 2009 | 1977 | Vanga Kadal |
| 2009 | Ayan | Pala Palakara, Oh Super Nova & Vizhi Moodi |
| 2009 | Mariyadhai | Yaar Paarthathu |
| 2009 | Maasilamani | Nacka Romba Nacka & Odi Odi Vilayada |
| 2009 | Muthirai | Om Shanthi Om & July Madhathil |
| 2009 | Naadodigal | Yakka Yakka |
| 2009 | Saa Boo Thri | Saa Boo Thri, Mazhayea Mazhayea & Adhu Oru Oru |
| 2009 | Ainthaam Padai | All Songs except 'Orampo' |
| 2009 | Azhagar Malai | Karugamani |
| 2009 | Solla Solla Inikkum | Sagiye Sagiye & Rajathi Rajaillae |
| 2009 | Kannukulle | Vaanambadigal |
| 2009 | Jaganmohini | Ponmanatheril & Nilavu Varum |
| 2009 | Aadhavan | Dammaku Dammaku |
| 2009 | Kanden Kadhalai | Suthudhu Suthudhu & Oru Naal Iravil |
| 2009 | Mathiya Chennai | Ilavayasu Pasanga |
| 2010 | Jaggubhai | Vaa... Dhinam Dhinam |
| 2010 | Aval Peyar Thamizharasi | Paalayan Kottai |
| 2010 | Kacheri Arambam | Kadavule Kadavule & Vithai Vithai |
| 2010 | Angadi Theru | All Songs |
| 2010 | Paiyaa | All Songs |
| 2010 | Sura | Thanjavoor Jillakari |
| 2010 | Kola Kolaya Mundhirika | Ada Engengum & Pootti Vaitha |
| 2010 | Singam | En Idhayam & Singam Singam |
| 2010 | Kalavani | All Songs |
| 2010 | Veluthu Kattu | Thalaseevi, Othaya Irundha & Sangili Bungili |
| 2010 | Madrasapattinam | All Songs |
| 2010 | Thillalangadi | Pattu Pattu & Sol Pechu |
| 2010 | Thambi Arjuna | Hajarea Hajarea & Mazhai Megam Mazhai |
| 2010 | Baana Kaathadi | En Nenjil & Oru Paithiyam Pidikkudhu |
| 2010 | Kaadhal Solla Vandhen | All Songs except 'Oh Shala' |
| 2010 | Naan Mahaan Alla | Vaa Vaa Nilavu & Oru Maalai Neram |
| 2010 | Boss Engira Bhaskaran | All Songs |
| 2010 | Sindhu Samaveli | All Songs |
| 2010 | Nandalala | Mella Oorndhu |
| 2010 | Raktha Charitharam (Dubbed version) | All Songs |
| 2010 | Ayyanar | All Songs |
| 2010 | Virudhagiri | Pookal Endrom |
| 2010 | Easan | Meyyana Inbam, Get Ready and Kannil Anbai |
| 2011 | Siruthai | Naan Romba Romba & Chellam Vada Chellam |
| 2011 | Singam Puli | Kangalal |
| 2011 | Ayyan | Enakenna Oruthi |
| 2011 | Avargalum Ivargalum | Enna Thavam Senjuputten |
| 2011 | Om Sakthi | Mayakkathe Machina & Surro Soodanane |
| 2011 | Ponnar Shankar | Kodi Kotti Koduthalum & Malar Villilae |
| 2011 | Vaanam | Vaanam, Who Am I & No Money No Money |
| 2011 | Narthagi | All Songs |
| 2011 | Engeyum Kadhal | Dhimu Dhimu |
| 2011 | Eththan | |
| 2011 | Sabash Sariyana Potti | Vandhutanya & Odu Mamey |
| 2011 | Avan Ivan | All Songs |
| 2011 | Theneer Viduthi | "Oru Maalai Pozhuthil" |
| 2011 | Deiva Thirumagal | All Songs |
| 2011 | Veppam | All Songs |
| 2011 | Puli Vesham | Boy Friend & Varaen Varaen |
| 2011 | Vandhaan Vendraan | Nagarudhe Nagarudhe |
| 2011 | Vedi | Ippadi Mazhai |
| 2011 | Vellore Maavattam | Adikuthu Adikuthu |
| 2011 | Raa Raa | Ethotho Ethotho |
| 2011 | 7 Aum Arivu | Yellae Lama & Mun Andhi |
| 2011 | Poraali | Yaar Ivan & Engirunthu |
| 2011 | Mambattiyan | Malaiyiru & Yedho Agudhey |
| 2011 | Mouna Guru | Yennayidhu |
| 2011 | Maharaja | Mexi Mexican Lady |
| 2012 | Vilayada Vaa | "Vanam Enthan" |
| 2012 | Businessman (Tamil) | All Songs |
| 2012 | Nanban | Heartile Battery & Nalla Nanban |
| 2012 | Vettai | All Songs |
| 2012 | Marina | Vanakkam Chennai, Kadhal Oru Devadhai & Marina Theme |
| 2012 | Dhoni | All Songs |
| 2012 | Aravaan | All Songs except 'Oore Oore Ennapetha' |
| 2012 | Kondaan Koduthaan | "Thanjavur Gopuram" |
| 2012 | Kazhugu | Aathadi Manasuthan |
| 2012 | Ullam | Kannai Thiranthu |
| 2012 | Oru Kal Oru Kannadi | All Songs |
| 2012 | Vazhakku Enn 18/9 | All Songs |
| 2012 | Ishtam | Aaruyire, Dhinakku Dhina & Vaenna Vaenna |
| 2012 | Marupadiyum Oru Kadhal | May Madham |
| 2012 | Saguni | Manasellam Mazhaiye |
| 2012 | Billa II | All Songs |
| 2012 | Kabadam | All songs |
| 2012 | Thaandavam | All songs |
| 2012 | Maattrraan | Rettai Kathire |
| 2012 | Thuppakki | Vennilave |
| 2012 | Ammavin Kaipesi | Enna Senji Pora & Rajapattai |
| 2012 | Neethaane En Ponvasantham | All Songs |
| 2012 | Sattam Oru Iruttarai | Aadam Eval, Thirumba Thirumba & Uyire Uyire |
| 2012 | Uyirmozhi | Vaanathil |
| 2012 | Ivanum Panakkaran | Kala Kala Mazhaiye |
| 2012 | Veyilodu Vilaiyadu | Elumicham Nirathil |
| 2013 | Samar | All Songs |
| 2013 | Maranthen Mannithen | Jikkimukki & En Ooru Erode |
| 2013 | Vathikuchi | Kuru Kuru |
| 2013 | Kedi Billa Killadi Ranga | Oru Poramboku & Deivangal Ellam |
| 2013 | Settai | Laila Laila |
| 2013 | Udhayam NH4 | Yaaro Ivan |
| 2013 | Aadhalal Kadhal Seiveer | Aaraaro |
| 2013 | Moondru Per Moondru Kadal | All Songs |
| 2013 | Chokkali | Hey Sakkarakatti |
| 2013 | Thillu Mullu | Aaja Aaja |
| 2013 | Thulli Vilayadu | Vaa Machi Oothiko & Yaar Ivalo |
| 2013 | Pattathu Yaanai | Enna Oru, Poosani Kaai & Thalakaal Puriyala |
| 2013 | Thalaivaa | All Songs |
| 2013 | Thanga Meenkal | All Songs |
| 2013 | Mathapoo | All Songs |
| 2013 | Raja Rani | Hey Baby, Chillena & Unnale |
| 2013 | Vanakkam Chennai | Oh Penne & Hey |
| 2013 | All in All Azhagu Raja | All Songs |
| 2013 | Thalaimuraigal | All Songs |
| 2013 | Puthiya Thiruppangal | All Songs |
| 2013 | Iruvar Ullam | Kadhal Kiliye & Mazhaiye Mazhaiye |
| 2014 | Bramman | Vaanathile |
| 2014 | Naan Sigappu Manithan | All songs |
| 2014 | Damaal Dumeel | Odi Odi |
| 2014 | Naan Than Bala | Uyire Unakkage, Amma Romba, Ariyama & Kanmani Penmani |
| 2014 | Ennathan Pesuvatho | Adada Adada, Nenje Nenje, Tholaivil Irukkum, Yaaro Yaaro |
| 2014 | Athithi | Solla Solla Ullamengum |
| 2014 | Saivam | All Songs |
| 2014 | Anjaan | Ek Do Teen Chaar |
| 2014 | Kathai Thiraikathai Vasanam Iyakkam | Pen Maegam Polavae |
| 2014 | Megha | Mugilo Megamo, Enna Vendum & Kalvane Kalvane |
| 2014 | Poojai | All Songs |
| 2014 | Nerungi Vaa Muthamidathe | All Songs |
| 2014 | Thirudan Police | All Songs except 'Moodupanikkul' |
| 2014 | Velmurugan Borewells | Venam Mapla & Vettungada |
| 2014 | Azhagiya Pandipuram | Kadavulidam |
| 2014 | Nadodi Vamsam | Oyyara Nadai & Pulli Vacha |
| 2015 | Darling | All Songs except 'Vandha Mala' |
| 2015 | Touring Talkies | Chakkan Chakka, Suttipenne & Uyire Unnai |
| 2015 | Kaaki Sattai | Kaaki Sattai |
| 2015 | JK Enum Nanbanin Vaazhkai | Nee Enna Pesuvai |
| 2015 | Nannbenda | Thaene Thaene Sendhaene |
| 2015 | Sagaptham | Karichan Kuruvi |
| 2015 | Soan Papdi | Hey Chocolates |
| 2015 | Kaaka Muttai | All songs |
| 2015 | Kaaval | Sakka Podu & Aavaram Poovukkum |
| 2015 | Nanbargal Narpani Mandran | Kattazhagi, Pocketil Kasu & Unnai Ennai |
| 2015 | Papanasam | All Songs |
| 2015 | Aavi Kumar | All Songs |
| 2015 | Idhu Enna Maayam | All Songs |
| 2015 | Sakalakala Vallavan | Buji Ma Buji Ma & Bulbu Vangittaen |
| 2015 | Vasuvum Saravananum Onna Padichavanga | All songs except Lucka Maattikkichi |
| 2015 | Trisha Illana Nayanthara | Mutham Kodutha |
| 2015 | Eetti | Un Swasam & Kuiyyo Muiyyo |
| 2016 | Saagasam | Angry Bird, O Madhu & Sayang Ku |
| 2016 | Anjala | Nakkalu Maama & Yaarai Ketpadhu |
| 2016 | Sethupathi | All songs |
| 2016 | Pugazh | Neeye Pothum |
| 2016 | Onbathu Kuzhi Sampath | Pangali, Ennenna Idhayathile, & Oppari |
| 2016 | Ko 2 | |
| 2016 | Theri | En Jeevan |
| 2016 | Enakku Innoru Per Irukku | Kannai Nambathey |
| 2016 | Amma Kanakku | Maths Tough |
| 2016 | Tamilselvanum Thaniyar Anjalum | Maya O Maya |
| 2016 | Meendum Oru Kadhal Kadhai | Hey Penne, Yedhedho Penne & Yen Nenjam Sidharudhu |
| 2016 | Kadavul Irukaan Kumaru | All songs |
| 2016 | Kaththi Sandai | Idhayam Idhayam |
| 2017 | Mupparimanam | Let's Go Party, Sokki Poraandi & Yaar Ivano |
| 2017 | Yaakkai | Nee En Kangal |
| 2017 | Taramani | All Songs |
| 2017 | Yaar Ivan | Sare Sare Gama & Uyire Uyire En Uyire |
| 2017 | Thittivasal | All Songs |
| 2018 | 2.0 | Pullinangal |
| 2018 | Yaagan | |
| 2019 | Sarvam Thaala Mayam | Maya Maya |
| 2019 | Pettikadai | Sudalamada Saamikitta |
| 2019 | July Kaatril | Merkilae Merkilae |

=== Television ===
- 1999 Jeyipathu Nijam
- 2005 En Thozhi En Kadhali En Manaivi....
- 2011 Appanum Aatha

=== Dialogues ===
- Kireedam
- Jagatheswaran
- Businessman (2012 film)

=== Publications ===
- Dhoosigal (Poems)
- Pattampoochi Virpavan (Poems)
- Newtonin Moondram Vidhi (Poems collection)
- Graamam Nagaram Maanagaram (Essays)
- AAna AAvanna (Poems)
- Aniladum Mundril (Essays)
- Vedikkai Paarpavan

== Awards ==
- 2005: Tamil Nadu State Film Award for Best Lyricist - Ghajini
- 2006: Filmfare Best Lyricist Award (Tamil) - Veyil
- 2007: Vijay Award for Best Lyricist - Sivaji: The Boss
- 2009: Vijay Award for Best Lyricist - Siva Manasula Sakthi
- 2009: Filmfare Best Lyricist Award (Tamil) - Ayan
- 2010: Vijay Music Award for Best Lyricist - Veppam
- 2011: SIIMA Award for Best Lyricist for "Un Pera Theriyathe" - Engaeyum Eppothum
- 2012: Tamil Nadu State Film Award for Best Lyricist - 'Multiple films
- 2013: National Film Award for Best Lyrics for "Ananda Yaazhai" - Thangameengal
- 2013: Tamil Nadu State Film Award for Best Lyricist - Thangameengal
- 2013: Vijay Award for Best Lyricist - "Dheivangal Ellam" - Kedi Billa Killadi Ranga
- 2013: SIIMA Award for Best Lyricist for "Ananda Yaazhai" - Thangameengal
- 2013: Filmfare Best Lyricist Award (Tamil) for "Ananda Yaazhai" - Thangameengal
- 2014: National Film Award for Best Lyrics for "Azhage" - Saivam
- 2014: Tamil Nadu State Film Award for Best Lyricist - Saivam
- 2014: Filmfare Award South for Best Lyrics for "Azhage" - Saivam

=== Honours ===
- Kalaimamani Award - 2006
