= Rightaa Thappaa =

- Directed by: R. Buvana
- Written by: R. Buvana
- Produced by: Buvana; Vijisha; Akshaya
- Starring: Ramana; Uma; Seetha
- Cinematography: Mahesh Muthuswami
- Edited by: Suresh Urs
- Music by: Karthik Raja
- Production company: VB Film Makers
- Release date: 4 March 2005
- Country: India
- Language: Tamil

Rightaa Thappaa (transl. Right or wrong?) is a 2005 Indian Tamil-language film written and directed by journalist-turned-filmmaker R. Buvana. It stars Ramana, Uma and Seetha. The film, Buvana's first full-length feature film, deals with eve teasing and was based on a true incident. Karthik Raja composed the music and Mahesh Muthuswamy was the cinematographer.

The film was first screened in 2004 before being theatrically released in 2005. For the year 2004, the film won two Tamil Nadu State Film Awards, the Tamil Nadu State Film Award for Best Family Film, and the Best Character Actor Award for Seetha and an award at the Women Directors' film festival in Kerala.

== Cast ==
- Ramana as Sathya
- Uma as Viji
- Seetha as Sathya's mother
- Bose Venkat
- Shanmugasundaram
- Meera Krishnan
- Suryakanth
- Hemalatha as Sathya's sister

== Production ==
The film marked the debut of R. Buvana who formerly worked as journalist and documentary film-maker and cinematographer who earlier assisted P. C. Sreeram.

== Soundtrack ==
The music was composed by Karthik Raja.

Song	Singers	Lyrics
Ilamai Embathu	Karthik Raja	R. Buvana
Kutti Kalagam	Manikka Vinayagam, Sujatha	Kirithiya
Thottuvidu	Bhavatharini	Snehan
Yaaridam Solven	Harini	Snehan

== Reception ==
Shobha Warrier from Rediff.com wrote that "Amid the unrealistic, just-titillation-no-plot Tamil films that are churned out every week, Righta Thappa will definitely stand out. There is no crude comedy, no action, no violence; you see only real emotions". Malathi Rangarajan of The Hindu wrote that the film is "A must-see for the youth and parents of today!" Visual Dasan of Kalki praised the director for making a film with a documentary feel without cinematic elements and added Righta Thappa can be boldly ticked as Ok Right as it has taken on a burning issue in a youth-friendly manner. BizHat.com wrote "‘Rightaa Thappa’, R.Buvana's first feature film which she's scripted, produced and directed, is a touching tale, sensitively narrated with a message for the younger generation. The film may lack gloss and could do with a bit more finesse, and has a slightly jerky narration. But one should commend the debutante for taking up a storyline that is different and relevant to the times, of trying to give a more realistic touch to the scenes and resisting the temptation to add commercial ingredients like fights and dances. Also for the feel-good ending she gives to her two-hour narration".
