= Bujji at Anupatti =

- Directed by: Raam Kandasamy
- Written by: Raam Kandasamy
- Produced by: Raam Kandasamy
- Starring: Karthik Vijay; Lavanya Kanmani
- Cinematography: Arun Mozhi Chozhan
- Edited by: Saravanan Madheswaran
- Music by: Karthik Raja
- Production company: Kavilayaa Creations
- Distributed by: 9V Studios
- Release date: 31 May 2024
- Country: India
- Language: Tamil

Bujji at Anupatti is a 2024 Indian Tamil-language drama film written and directed by Raam Kandasamy. The film stars Karthik Vijay and Lavanya Kanmani in the lead roles. The film was produced by Raam Kandasamy under the banner of Kavilayaa Creations, and had a theatrical release on 31 May 2024.

== Cast ==
- Karthik Vijay
- Lavanya Kanmani
- Meena Gopalakrishnan
- Kamal Kumar
- Pranithi Sivasankaran
- Vaitheeswari

== Production ==
The film noted debuted for the director Raam Kandasamy.The cinematography of the film was by Arun Mozhi Chozhan and the editing was handled by Saravanan Madheswaran.

== Reception ==
Abhinav Subramanian of The Times of India rated two out of five and wrote that "Bujji at Anupatti is a film that stumbles despite its good intentions." Manigandan KR of Times Now rated two point five out of five and noted that "This is a clean, simple entertainer that can be enjoyed with the entire family."
