= K. Praveen Nayak =

Indian film director

- Born: Praveen; 12 April 1962 (age 64); Mangalore, Karnataka, India
- Occupations: Film director, film producer, screenwriter, photographer
- Years active: 1978–present

K. Praveen Nayak (born 1962) is an Indian film director, in the Kannada film industry.

== Personal life ==
K. Praveen Nayak was born in 1962 to K. Krishna Nayak and K. Radha Nayak in Mangalore, Karnataka, India.

== Career ==
Praveen started his career in photography, but moved to directing soon thereafter, directing many Kannada movies. More recently he has also directed a short film entitled Twitter Loka.

=== Books ===
K. Praveen Nayak, was close aid of the actor Dr. Rajkumar has written book on the legend "Rajkumar: Ondu beLaku" He also published a condensed version of the book as "Rajkumar: Ondu beLaku" Praveen has also penned another book in English on the veteran actor "Rajkumar: A Journey with the legend".

=== Television ===
Praveen was an anchor for Doordarshan. He has also directed a popular serial Shri Ramakrishna Parahamsa telecasted in Doordarshan. In this serial, Praveen also acted as Ramakrishna.

== Filmography ==
Year	Film	Director	Actor	Notes
1993	Aakasmika	No	Yes	
1994	Shhh!	No	Yes	
1999	Z	Yes	Yes	
2001	Hoo Anthiya Uhoo Anthiya	Yes	Yes	
2003	Meese Chiguridaaga	Yes	Yes	
2004	Bisi Bisi	No	Yes	
2006	Rama Shama Bhama	No	Yes	
2016	Twitter Loka	Yes	No	Short film

== Awards ==
Karnataka State Award: Best Book for Rajkumar: Ondu Belaku, 2012
