= Pyramid Natarajan =

Indian actor

- Born: 1944 (age 81–82); Valuthoor, Papanasam, Thanjavur district, Tamil Nadu
- Occupations: Actor, producer
- Years active: 1987-2023
- Children: Kumar Natarajan
- Website: https://pyramidnatarajan.com/

Pyramid Natarajan is a former Indian actor and producer, who has appeared in character roles in Tamil cinema. He made his breakthrough as an actor playing a role in Mani Ratnam's Alai Payuthey (2000) playing Madhavan's father, before playing the antagonist in several films.

== Career ==
Natarajan was born in a village called Valuthoor near, Papanasam, Thanjavur, Tamil Nadu and studied in Shaukathul Islam Balya Muslim Sangam Higher Elementary School in his boyhood and moved to Madras as a teenager, hoping to make a breakthrough into films. He was able to briefly join K. Balachander's drama troupe, Ragini Recreations, and appear in productions before soon starting his own troupe and staging a play. Following a successful business proposal, Natarajan was able to take over as executive producer of Gemini Films and was able to learn the nuances of administration.

He joined hands with K.Balachander to nurture Kavithalayaa Productions as a joint production company.

In 1997 Pyramid Entertainment Limited was promoted by Mr. V. Natarajan. Before promoting the company, V. Natarajan had produced number of films. He had been involved in 55 films in various capacities such as executive director, Executive Producer and Producer. He is an executive committee member of various Trade Bodies like Tamil Film Producers Council & South Indian Film Chamber of Commerce. He is also a member of the government body formed to deal with film industry and also an advisory committee member on Film Taxation.

He is currently running a hotel.

== Notable filmography ==
=== Actor ===
Year	Film	Role	Notes
1987	Velaikkaran		Uncredited role
1987	Kavalan Avan Kovalan	Himself	Credited as Kavithalayam Natarajan
1990	Varavu Nalla Uravu	Manager	
1991	Sigaram	Himself	
2000	Alai Payuthey	Varadharajan	
2001	Friends	Gautham's father	
2001	Vaanchinathan	Varadharajan	
2001	Samudhiram	Rasamani's father-in-law	
2002	Azhagi		
2002	Dhaya	Judge Venkatraman	
2002	Charlie Chaplin	Susi's father	
2002	Thulluvadho Ilamai	Pooja's father	
2002	Arputham	Ashok's father	
2002	Namma Veetu Kalyanam	Minister	
2002	Siva Rama Raju	Narendra Varma	Telugu film
2002	Solla Marandha Kadhai	Chokkalingam	
2002	Villain	Minister	
2003	Kaadhal Sugamaanathu	Ganesh's father	
2003	Inidhu Inidhu Kadhal Inidhu		
2003	Aahaa Ethanai Azhagu	Natarajan	
2003	Naam	Selvendram	
2003	Ragasiyamai		
2003	Anjaneya	Minister	
2003	Ottran	Kumarasamy	
2003	Kurumbu		
2003	Indru	Minister Oppilamani	
2004	Virumaandi	Vaidhyanathan	
2004	Udhaya	Newspaper editor	
2004	Azhagiya Theeye		
2004	Neranja Manasu	Thirumalaisamy	
2005	Kannadi Pookal		
2005	Ullam Ketkumae	Priya's father	
2005	February 14	Pooja's grandfather	
2005	Padhavi Paduthum Paadu	Veerabhadran	
2005	Mazhai	Producer	
2006	Kalvanin Kadhali	Sathya's father	
2006	Thirupathi	Minister	
2007	Sivaji	Sivaji's Lawyer	
2013	Naiyaandi	Sambandham	
2014	Naan Sigappu Manithan		
2014	Oru Modhal Oru Kadhal	Karthik's father	
2014	Ninaithathu Yaaro		
2015	Pulan Visaranai 2		
2017	Pannam Pathinonnum Seyum		
2017	Azhagana En Charupriya		
2023	Karumegangal Kalaigindrana		

=== Producer ===
Year	Film	Notes
1996	Love Birds	
1996	Enakkoru Magan Pirappan	
1997	Ettupatti Rasa	
1997	Pistha	
1998	Ponmanam	
1998	En Aasai Rasave	
1999	Sangamam	
2000	Rhythm	
2004	Udhaya	
