= Z (1999 film) =

- Directed by: K. Praveen Nayak
- Written by: K. Praveen Nayak
- Produced by: H. P. Amarnath
- Starring: Prakash Raj; Prema; Ritu Shivpuri
- Cinematography: R. Giri
- Edited by: Suresh Urs
- Music by: Rajesh Ramanath; V. Manohar; Praveen D. Rao; Praveen Kumar; Murali Mohan
- Production company: Prem Rathna Creations
- Release date: 19 February 1999
- Running time: 133 minutes
- Country: India
- Language: Kannada

Z is a 1999 Indian Kannada-language mystery thriller film written and directed by K. Praveen Nayak. It stars Prakash Rai, Prema and Ritu Shivpuri in the lead roles and features five different composers tuning for the soundtrack.

Z was released on 19 February 1999. It was dubbed in Telugu and released in Telugu as Maha Natudu.

== Cast ==
- Prakash Rai as Prakash
- Prema as Prema
- Ritu Shivpuri
- Sundeep Malani
- Tennis Krishna
- Harsha Darbar
- Kote Prabhakar
- Agro Chikkanna
- Sunitha
- Nagesh Mayya
- Dinesh Mangaluru
- K. Praveen Nayak as Director
- Vaijanath Biradar
- Bank Suresh
- Fayaz Khan
- A. S. Murthy

== Production ==
This film was said to be Naik's answer to Upendra's directorial A (1998).

== Soundtrack ==
Five composers contributed six tracks for the film, including the film's director Praveen Nayak, who composed one song and wrote lyrics for two others.

S. No.	Song title	Music director	Singer(s)	Lyrics
1	"Prema Prema"	Rajesh Ramanath	Rajesh Krishnan, Sowmya Raoh	K. Praveen Nayak
2	"Reelo Reelo"	Murali Mohan	Murali Mohan, L. N. Shastry	Murali Mohan
3	"Nee Rathiyu Naa Rathanu"	K. Praveen Nayak	Mangala	Sadhu Kokila
4	"Thutiyali Thutiyu"	Rajesh Ramanath	Sowmya Raoh	K. Praveen Nayak
5	"Choli Aata"	Praveen D. Rao	L. N. Shastry	Achyuth
6	"Kele Kishori"	V. Manohar	Rajesh Krishnan, Sowmya Raoh	V. Manohar

== Reception ==
A critic from The New Indian Express wrote that "The only reason to watch this movie is if you have nothing else to do". Jyothi Raghuram of The Hindu wrote "Praveen’s story rambles, and his dialogues are simplistic. His screenplay is in keeping with all of this. Yet, this debutant director cannot be written off, for ‘Z” does have its moments of pluses, and Praveen, his flashes of directorial grip."
