= Hoo Anthiya Uhoo Anthiya =

2001 film by K. Praveen Nayak

- Directed by: K. Praveen Nayak
- Written by: K. Praveen Nayak
- Produced by: Usha Sandeep Kumar
- Starring: Ramesh Aravind; Anu Prabhakar; Isha Koppikar
- Cinematography: R. Giri
- Edited by: Suresh Urs
- Music by: Karthik Raja
- Distributed by: Ramu Enterprises
- Release date: 13 April 2001
- Running time: 2 hours 29 minutes
- Country: India
- Language: Kannada

Hoo Anthiya Uhoo Anthiya is a 2001 Indian Kannada-language romantic drama film directed by K. Praveen Nayak and produced by N. Bharathi Devi. The film stars Ramesh Aravind, Isha Koppikar and Anu Prabhakar.

The film was released on 13 April 2001 to generally positive reviews from critics who lauded the lead actors performance. Karthik Raja made his debut in Kannada cinema through this film.

== Cast ==
- Ramesh Aravind as Shivu
- Isha Koppikar as Usha
- Anu Prabhakar as Chandana
- Karan as Karan
- Avinash
- K. Praveen Nayak as Nayak
- Pushpa Swamy

== Soundtrack ==
Hoo Anthiya Uhoo Anthiya

Soundtrack album by Karthik Raja
- Genre: Feature film soundtrack

The music of the film was composed by Karthik Raja. Bollywood playback singer Sadhana Sargam made her first Kannada language recording with this soundtrack.

No.	Title	Lyrics	Singer(s)	Length
1.	"Chanda Ee Chanda"	K. Kalyan	Madhu Balakrishnan
2.	"Minchulli Kenne"	Prakash	Mano, Febi Mani
3.	"Chandada Chandani"	Doddarangegowda	Srinivas, Sujatha
4.	"Baana Kolminchu"	Doddarangegowda	Hariharan
5.	"Kanasugala"	M. N. Vyasa Rao	S. P. Balasubrahmanyam
6.	"Belli Chandiranu"	Doddarangegowda	Madhu Balakrishnan, Bhavatharini
7.	"Chanda Ee Chanda (female)"	K. Kalyan	Sadhana Sargam

== Reception ==
Srikanth of Deccan Herald wrote that "Upcoming director Praveen Nayak shows flashes of brilliance but he should do more homework on his lighting scheme used in the film and rectify his mistakes that he has made in the film". A critic from Chitraloka wrote that "It is not too good. It is three good. Firstly the story, secondly the screenplay technique cum direction and thirdly smashing performance by lead artistes keep the momentum of the movie immaculately made for the younger generation".

== External source ==
- Hoo Anthiya Uhoo Anthiya at IMDb
