= Oru Ponnu Oru Paiyan =

- Directed by: Naren Deivanayagam
- Screenplay by: Naren Deivanayagam
- Story by: Naren Deivanayagam
- Produced by: K. Bharatkrishna
- Starring: Sandeep; Roopasree; Shubha Poonja; Madhu
- Cinematography: AJ Darshan
- Edited by: B. Lenin
- Music by: Karthik Raja
- Release date: 2 September 2007
- Country: India
- Language: Tamil

Oru Ponnu Oru Paiyan (transl. A boy and a girl) is a 2007 Indian Tamil-language romance film directed by Naren Deivanayagam. It dwells on the untold love of a pair due to family circumstances. The film stars Sandeep, Roopasree, Shubha Poonja and Madhu.

== Plot ==
Sakthi (Sandeep) is the only son of Sharath Babu and Bhanupriya. Having tired of urban living, the elderly couple takes up residence in a village along with their son. Viswanathan (Madhu) is the head of the village. He is highly respected for his fairness and for his love and compassion for the poor. His granddaughter (played by Roopa) is a village belle. She catches Sakthi's attention as she flits around the village like a butterfly. The two are drawn towards each other and eventually fall in love. Their affair has the tacit blessings of Viswanathan. But it is not going to be a bed of roses for the two as trouble brews up in the person of Sakthi's ex-flame, city-bred glamour girl played by Shubha Punja.

== Cast ==
- Sandeep as Sakthi
- Roopasree
- Shubha Poonja
- Sarath Babu
- Bhanupriya
- Sadhana
- Charle
- Charan Raj
- Subbalakshmi
- Rajesh Hebbar
- Shanti Williams
- Aarthi
- Crane Manohar
- Suruli Manohar
- Madhu as Viswanathan

== Soundtrack ==
Soundtrack was composed by Karthik Raja.

No.	Song	Singers	Lyrics
1	"Malargale"	Bela Shende	Na. Muthukumar
2	"Oru Ponnu"	Karthik, Swarnalatha	Na. Muthukumar
3	"Nenjil"	Sangeetha Rajeshwaran	Yugabharathi
4	"Nenjil"	Karthik Raja	Yugabharathi
5	"So Sweet Da"	Ranjith	Pa. Vijay
6	"Kalkona Uthathukari"	Karthik, Rita	Yugabharathi
7	Yaana Pasi	Ramya NSK, Vijay Yesudas	Andal Priyadarshini

== Reception ==
Meenal of Kalki wrote screenplay was slow and lacks speed and lack of imagination in many places calling it another non sticky film. Chennai Online called it "An unassuming little film with some good moments".
