= Alexander (1996 film) =

- Poster
- Directed by: Keyaar
- Screenplay by: Keyaar
- Story by: Panchu Arunachalam
- Produced by: Meena Panchu Arunachalam
- Starring: Vijayakanth; Sangita
- Cinematography: Raja Rajan
- Edited by: B. Lenin; V. T. Vijayan
- Music by: Karthik Raja
- Production company: P. A. Art Productions
- Release date: 10 November 1996
- Running time: 130 minutes
- Country: India
- Language: Tamil

Alexander is a 1996 Indian Tamil-language action film written and directed by Keyaar, from a story by Panchu Arunachalam. The film stars Vijayakanth and Sangita. It was released on 10 November 1996.

== Plot ==
The film opens with a staged road accident to retrieve a crucial file from Choudary. Although Choudary narrowly escapes with the file, the assailants remain unaware of his escape. Commissioner Soundarapandian receives a tip about Ashok's brothers engaging in smuggling via aeroplane. Instead of handling the matter himself, he informs the CBI, and officer Rajasekhar assigns Alexander to apprehend the culprits and halt the smuggling operation. At the airport, Alexander confronts Hari, one of Ashok's brothers, and seizes drugs hidden in a prosthetic leg. Ashok threatens Alexander over the phone and uses his influence to secure Hari's release without charges after Hari's accomplices surrender in court. The next day, Arunkumar "Arun," another of Ashok's brothers, is mysteriously murdered.

Alexander voluntarily takes on the murder case, suspecting that Ashok's brothers' illicit businesses and political connections are linked to the disappearance of Gandhirajan, who had been investigating them. As Alexander delves into the investigation, Ashok closely monitors his progress to avoid being caught. Alexander's inquiry leads him to Priya, who, through a gold bracelet, is revealed to be Arun's murderer. However, Priya, Gandhirajan's daughter, remains unaware that Alexander is a CBI officer and refuses to divulge any information. Determined to protect herself, Priya warns him to leave her alone. Meanwhile, Alexander is ambushed by a henchman but manages to retaliate and escape. Ashok suspects Priya of murdering Arun and upon discovering Priya's connection to Gandhirajan, Ashok orders his men to search her house for Gandhirajan's file and also follow her to Bangalore, where she meets her friend Brinda.

Ashok's men kidnap Priya and Brinda, but Alexander rescues Priya, while Brinda is fatally shot. Priya's stepmother, Thayamma, arranges her marriage, revealing Alexander as the groom, much to Priya's shock and dismay. Alexander reveals his true identity as a CBI officer and explains that he married Priya to protect her. He also shares that Gandhirajan had chosen him as Priya's husband. Although Priya learns the truth, she remains tight-lipped about the murder. Ashok discovers Choudary, whom they believed had died in the orchestrated car accident. To intimidate Alexander, Ashok, and Hari plant a bomb in Alexander's house, which he successfully detonates. Enraged, Alexander confronts Ashok at his residence, seeking justice. Unbeknownst to Alexander, his superior, Rajasekar, allies with Ashok to prevent the missing file from falling into Alexander's hands. On Thayamma's advice, Priya accompanies Alexander to their village for a ritual. At the temple, Alexander reveals the bracelet he found at the murder scene, prompting Priya to confess. However, Choudary interrupts, distracting Alexander. After a brief fight, Alexander receives a letter directing him to meet Choudary. Choudary shares a flashback about Gandhirajan.

In the past, Arun befriended Gandhirajan, then threatened him for the file detailing Ashok's brothers' crimes. Gandhirajan hands the file over to Choudary and writes a letter to Alexander, asking him to protect Priya. Arun kills Gandhirajan and deceives Priya into believing he is a well-wisher. Priya discovers Arun's true intentions, escapes, and unintentionally kills him in self-defense. Choudary reveals that he faked his death to avoid Ashok's men and exposes Rajasekhar as Ashok's mole. As Choudary finishes his story, Ashok's men kill him. Before dying, Choudary leaves a cryptic clue, "14596," which Alexander deciphers as the date of Gandhirajan's death (14 May 1996). Alexander visits Gandhirajan's grave and retrieves the file, exposing Ashok's brothers' hawala fraud scams and connections to politicians and government bureaucrats.

Alexander decides to broadcast the details on live television. But, Ashok kidnaps Priya and negotiates with Alexander, demanding he hand over the file in exchange for Priya. Alexander appears to comply but has secretly recorded Ashok's confession using hidden cameras. Alexander subdues Ashok's henchmen, and in the ensuing standoff, Ashok shoots Hari. Ultimately, Priya is acquitted of Arun's murder, deemed self-defense. Ashok, Rajasekhar, and the corrupt officials and politicians are arrested, while Alexander receives an award from the Chief Minister of Tamil Nadu, M. Karunanidhi.

== Cast ==
- Vijayakanth as Alexander, CBI Officer
- Sangita as Priya
- Prakash Raj as Ashok
- Srihari as Hari
- Kavitha as Thayamma
- Jeeva as Brinda, Priya's friend
- Rajasekhar as Rajasekhar, a CBI officer
- Laxmi Rattan as Choudary, a senior CBI officer
- Aditya Kumar as Arunkumar
- Bobby as Ashok's henchman
- Nizhalgal Ravi as Gandhirajan, CBI Officer (Extended Special Appearance)
- Vadivukkarasi as Lakshmi, Alexander's sister (Special Appearance)
- LIC Narasimhan as a doctor (Special Appearance)
- Annadurai Kannadhasan as Commissioner Soundarapandian

== Production ==
Keyaar was approached by Panchu Arunachalam to direct a film for his production company. Vijayakanth initially expressed doubts over the selection of Keyaar as a director for an action film as he was primarily known for dramatic and humorous films, but was convinced after Arunachalam gave confidence. Keyaar originally planned a grand climax with ships at port; due to rainfall he shelved the plans and instead used archive footage of Vijayakanth receiving an award from former Tamil Nadu chief minister M. Karunanidhi from an old event and added it towards the film's end.

== Soundtrack ==
The music was composed by Karthik Raja.

Song	Singer	Lyrics	Duration
"Alexander"	Bhavatharini, Anupama, Mahanadhi Shobana, Yuvan Shankar Raja, S. P. B. Charan	Vaali	3:36
"Koothadichu"	Venkat Prabhu, Karthik Raja, Burns	Paarthi Bhaskar	5:25
"Nadhiyoram"	P. Unnikrishnan, Bhavatharini	Paarthi Bhaskar	4:52
"Rajarajan Nane"	Sujatha, Mano	Panchu Arunachalam	4:40
"Thaathi Thaathi"	Malaysia Vasudevan, Anupama, Mahanadhi Shobana	Vaali	4:44

== Reception ==
R. P. R. of Kalki called Prakash Raj the film's biggest strength, and also appreciated Karthik Raja's score.
