= Naam Iruvar Namakku Iruvar =

- Theatrical release poster
- Directed by: Sundar C
- Written by: Sundar C
- Dialogue by: Subha
- Produced by: K. Balachandran; D. Shankar
- Starring: Prabhu Deva; Meena; Maheshwari
- Cinematography: U. K. Senthil Kumar
- Edited by: P. Sai Suresh
- Music by: Karthik Raja
- Production company: B. S. Arts
- Release date: 14 January 1998
- Running time: 155 minutes
- Country: India
- Language: Tamil

Naam Iruvar Namakku Iruvar (transl. We Two, Ours Two) is a 1998 Indian Tamil-language romantic comedy film directed and co-written by Sundar C. Prabhu Deva, Meena and Maheswari played the leading roles, whilst the film featured an extensive cast, along with a bevy of supporting actors. The film, released on 14 January 1998, is loosely based on the 1995 film Two Much.

== Plot ==
To steal an expensive diamond, a swindler pretends to be in love with a wealthy businessman's daughter. Later, the swindler meets Pooja's sister and gets attracted to her.

== Cast ==
- Prabhu Deva as Prabhu/Deva
- Meena as Indhu
- Maheshwari as Pooja
- Manivannan as Mani
- Gemini Ganesan as Prabhu's grandfather
- S. S. Chandran as K. D. Chandrasekhar and Kunji Nair
- Senthil as Kumbudraswamy and Kuppuswamy IAS
- Vivek as Valayapathi and Police Inspector
- Manjula Vijayakumar as Manjula
- Kavitha as Janaki
- C. R. Saraswathi as Saraswathi
- Devaki as Girija
- Vasuki as Servant
- Anandaraj as Thief
- Kazan Khan as Thief
- Vichu Viswanath as Thief
- Jayaprakasam as Thief
- Halwa Vasu as Singapore
- Tirupur Ramasamy as Fake police
- Chelladurai as Fake police
- King Kong as Siddha doctor
- Mohan V. Raman as Pooja's grandfather
- Pandu
- Rajeev
- Manager Cheena as Settu
- Master Aditya
- Jayaram as Pooja's uncle (guest appearance)

== Production ==
During a stage of production, Prabhudeva, Maheshwari and the entire crew including Sundar C had landed in South Africa. Rambha had not boarded the plane with them as planned. The unit became nervous, not knowing what to do, as the shooting the time and spot that they had reserved in Sun City was getting wasted. After waiting for a long time, they went ahead and had Maheshwari put on Rambha's costumes and picturised the song with her and Prabhudeva. Rambha, who arrived two days later, got wild and furious that Sundar and company would picture the song without her. She went back to Chennai almost three days before the Naam Iruvar Namakku Iruvar unit and got ready to shoot for Kaathala Kaathala instead.

Sundar and others who were angry and disappointed with Rambha's behaviour filed complaints with film organisations. Meanwhile, more developments came about once Rambha left the film. It appeared that the director's wife, Khushbu had strongly thrown in a recommendation for Simran to grab the role that Rambha had trashed, but Meena entered the picture from somewhere, all of a sudden. The fact was that Meena gave up her Kaathala Kaathala role for Rambha and Soundarya, while Rambha gave up her Na. Ir. Na. Ir role for Meena. On a side note to the entire matter, Simran announced that she gave up her chances to star in both Kaathala Kaathala and Naam Iruvar Namakku Iruvar, because she did not want to pack herself with call sheet troubles and not be able to act in that she had already committed to.

== Soundtrack ==
The soundtrack album consists of 6 songs composed by Karthik Raja and lyrics written by Palani Bharathi. The opening of the song "Hello Mr. Kadhala" adapts from "Buenos Aires" by Madonna, while the remainder of the song is original.

Track listing
| No. | Title | Singer(s) | Length |
|---|---|---|---|
| 1. | "Intha Siru Pennai" | Vibha Sharma, Hariharan | 5:41 |
| 2. | "Kattaana Ponnu Romantica" | Hariharan, Sadhana Sargam | 4:22 |
| 3. | "Aathi Adi Aathi" | Priya, Vibha Sharma, Farah | 5:45 |
| 4. | "Aiylesaa Aiylesaa" | Udit Narayan, Pop Shalini | 4:43 |
| 5. | "Nadanakalarani" | Yuvan Shankar Raja, Premji Amaran, Bhavatharini | 5:16 |
| 6. | "Hello Mr. Kadhala" | Udit Narayan, Sadhana Sargam, Kavita Paudwal | 5:33 |
| Total length: | | | 31:20 |

== Release and reception ==
D. S. Ramanujam of The Hindu appreciated the cast performances, particularly Prabhu Deva's, and the cinematography. Ji of Kalki wrote the story has a lot of scope for comedy; although there is no dearth of laughing situations, instead of bursts of laughter in the theatre, why there are only mild laughter spread here and there which only Sundar can think. Army of comedians, wedding atmosphere, impersonation, chasing, hiding, all the usual techniques are used with the old style, so fans are reluctant to open their hearts. The film had a strong opening at the box office in January 1998.
