= Palamathi Hills =

Palamathi Hills Balamathi Hills or Balamathi
- Village / Hill station of Vellore city
- Location of Palamathi in Tamil Nadu
- Coordinates: 12.885°N 79.161°E

Population
  - Rural: 2,004 (as of 2,011)
- Time zone: IST ( UTC + 05:30)

The Palamathi Hills (also Balamathi, Balamathi Hills) are an extension of the Eastern Ghats spread across southeastern parts of Vellore City in Tamil Nadu. The Palamathi Hill range, the nearby Palamathi Reserve Forest, and the Otteri lake are collectively referred to as Palamathi Hills. The area is a hotspot for various birds and various flora. The hill top has a Hindu temple (Bala Murugan Kovil).

== Location ==
The Palmathi Hills, the Palamathi Reserve Forest and the Otteri lake are situated in the periphery of the Vellore City. The whole range is a part of the Eastern Ghats. The official designation of the area is a Village Panchayat. The whole Palamathi village panchayat is spread over five habitations namely Arasankulam, Chetteri, Senganatham, Krishnapuram, Melsenganatham and the main village Palamathi.

== Population and economy ==
The total rural population of Palamathi village panchayat is 2004 as per the 2011 census. Majority of the people living in Palamathi village atop the hill are migrants from other places of Tamil Nadu, Karnataka and Andhra Pradesh. Most of the population does not have a tribal status. The people here generally cultivate paddy, groundnut and ragi. The main income for many here is selling the small cultivation in the nearby city market. Blue metal mining is also prevalent in and around Palamathi.

== Flora and fauna ==
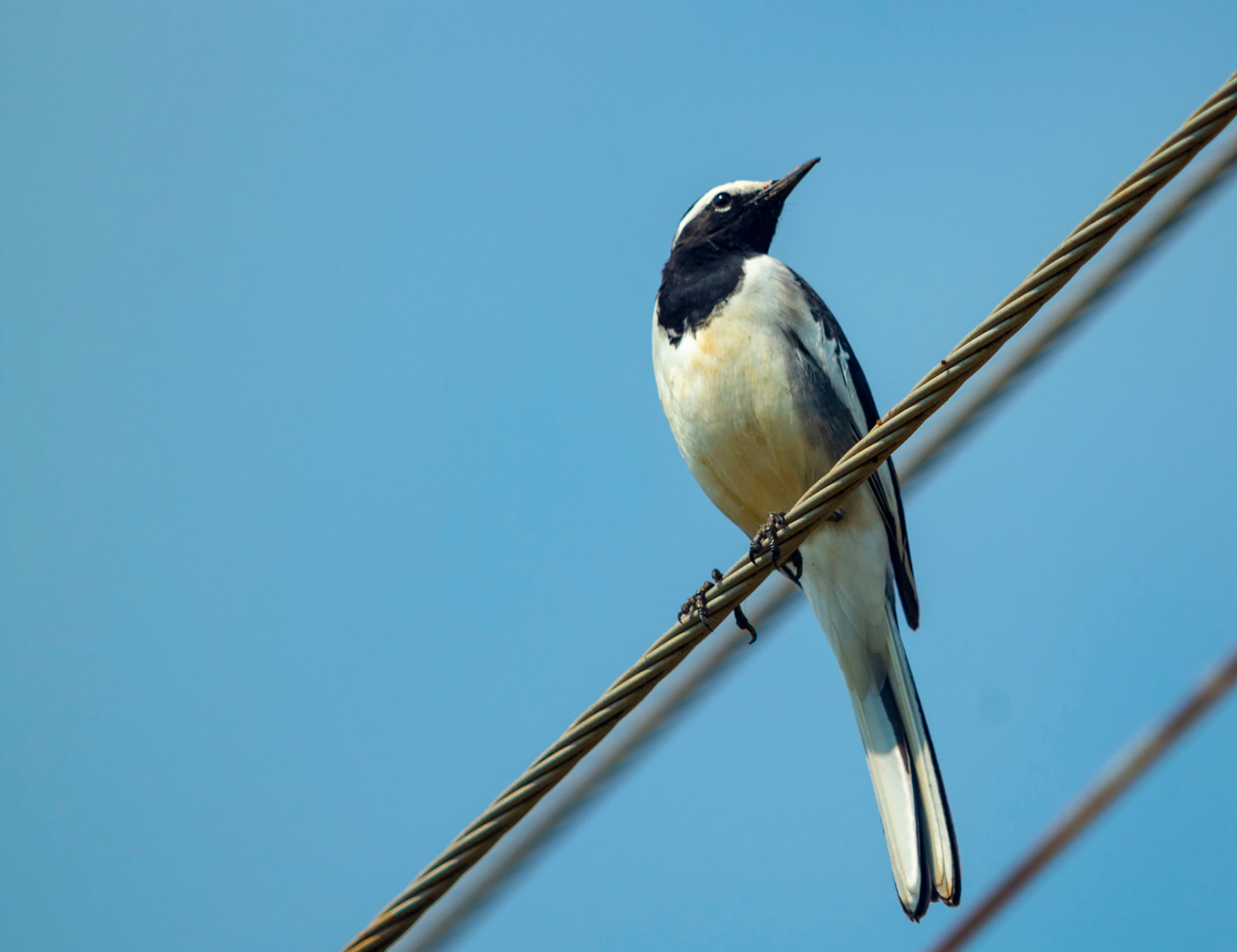
White-browed wagtail in the Palamthi Hills (October 2019)

The Palamathi Hills is home to many species of birds, some of the common birds found here include: Red vented Bulbul, Green bee eater, Myna, White throated kingfisher, Indian Roller bird and Black Drongo

== Otteri Lake ==
At the foot of Palamathi hills is the Otteri Lake. The lake was man made in the British era to supply water to Vellore. The lake is also a thriving hotspot for various avians as it is undisturbed by the city's pollution and is located in the periphery of the city. The lake reached its maximum capacity in 2015 due to heavy rains.
