= Dumm Dumm Dumm =

2001 film by Azhagam Perumal

- Theaterical Release poster
- Directed by: Azhagam Perumal
- Written by: Mani Ratnam; R. Selvaraj; Azhagam Perumal
- Produced by: Mani Ratnam; G. Srinivasan
- Starring: R. Madhavan; Jyothika
- Cinematography: Ramji
- Edited by: Sreekar Prasad
- Music by: Karthik Raja
- Production company: Madras Talkies
- Release date: 13 April 2001
- Running time: 151 minutes
- Country: India
- Language: Tamil

Dumm Dumm Dumm (transl. Wedding beats) is a 2001 Indian Tamil-language romantic comedy film co-written and directed by Azhagam Perumal and produced by director Mani Ratnam under his home studio, Madras Talkies. It stars R. Madhavan and Jyothika, with Vivek, Manivannan and Murali portraying other pivotal roles. The film featured cinematography by Ramji, editing by Sreekar Prasad and music composed by Karthik Raja.

Dumm Dumm Dumm opened on 13 April 2001 to positive reviews and became a commercial hit.

The film depicts two career-oriented young people Aditya and Ganga being pressured into an arranged marriage by their respective families. To their own surprise, they get along well and are attracted to each other. Their wedding is cancelled due to a violent quarrel between their families over cheating at a card game. The would-be-couple make efforts to reunite.

== Plot ==
Ganga lives in a small village in Tirunelveli district of Tamil Nadu and yet secures state second rank in XII board exams. Although she wishes to pursue civil engineering at Chennai, her father Veluthambi plans for her to marry young Lawyer Adhithya aka Adhi, who hails from the same village. The reason for this alliance is that Adhi's rich dad, Maruthapillai was Veluthambi's former boss who helped him become a rich rice mill owner, and Velu wants to repay the moral debt. Adhi is fun-loving and has just completed his law degree and prefers to enjoy his bachelor life at Chennai and is not interested in marriage.

Adhi comes to the village and meets Ganga trying to convey his feelings. To his surprise, Ganga is also not interested in marriage as she wants to study in Chennai. Both of them decide to somehow stop the wedding by creating some problem before the wedding, but all their efforts go in vain as both the families get even closer following their plans.

Slowly, Adhi and Ganga start liking each other and decide to get married. However, to their shock, on the day before the wedding, a small quarrel erupts between Veluthambi and Maruthapillai while playing cards. Maruthapillai accuses Veluthambi of cheating during the game, which was actually done by Adhi's relative Dr Kathamuthu. Veluthambi retaliates to prove his genuineness. The argument, which started in a funnier tone, gets serious slowly, and immediately, both of the families decide to get the wedding cancelled and in the tussle, Adhi's house servant, Saami, is stabbed. Ganga's brother-in-law, a government school PT teacher, is blamed for the incident and is arrested.

Ganga is sent to Chennai to pursue engineering and stays with her distant relative Sivaji, who is a leading lawyer by profession. Adhi, who also lives in Chennai, meets Ganga, and they both now plan to get the cancelled wedding re-arranged again by their families. Adhi comes in place of his friend Jim as a junior lawyer to assist Sivaji, thereby meeting Ganga every day. Sivaji finds that Adhi has not come as a junior and instead for some other reason. However, he misunderstands that Adhi is in love with his own daughter and fears that his daughter might elope with Adhi someday. Both Maruthapillai and Veluthambi gets to know Adhi and Ganga meeting each other, a fight erupts and they both separate them again.

Adhi appears as a lawyer for Veluthambi's son-in-law, and saves him based on lack of evidence. Veluthambi claims to plan a marriage between his son-in-law and Ganga, hearing this, Adhi is heartbroken. His son-in-law confesses that he will marry only Pattamma. Adhi confesses to his father that he loves Ganga but Maruthapillai argues about saving his honor and status. On the other hand Veluthambi accepts Ganga's confession and he is ready to get them married. Ganga learns that Adhi and Maruthapillai fought but his mother conveys wrongly that Adhi doesn't want to marry Ganga. She is heartbroken to hear it.

Dr Kathamuthu is admitted to the hospital, believes its all because of karma confesses to Maruthapillai that he was the culprit and Veluthambi was innocent. Adhi's father understands that Veluthambi was innocent and did no wrong and apologizes to him. Adhi finds Ganga and finally confesses and proposes marriage. Adhi and Ganga are happily united in the end.

== Cast ==
- R. Madhavan as Adhitya aka Aadhi
- Jyothika as Ganga Veluthambi
- Vivek as Jim
- Manivannan as Sivaji
- Murali as Veluthambi, Ganga's father
- Delhi Kumar as Maruthapillai, Adhi's father
- Kalairani as Adhi's mother
- V. K. Ramasamy as Ganga's grandfather
- Chinni Jayanth as Sivaji's client
- Gowtham Sundararajan as Ganga's brother-in-law
- M. S. Bhaskar as Dr Kathamuthu, Adhi's relative
- Kalpana as Pattamma
- Richa Ahuja as Asha
- Vaiyapuri as Saami
- Sridhar as Shree
- Shanthi Williams as Sivaji's wife
- S. N. Parvathy as Ganga's grandmother
- Preetha as Charu
- Sheela Kaur as Ganga's sister

== Production ==
Mani Ratnam chose his assistant Azhagam Perumal to direct a film for his production studio, Madras Talkies in late 2000 and the pair worked on a screenplay together. Azhagam Perumal had earlier begun two projects, Mudhal Mudhalaaga in 1998 and Udhaya in 1998, but both films ran into production troubles, so his mentor Mani Ratnam was keen to launch him as a director. The basic plotline of the film was taken from the episode Love Story from Suhasini's 1991 miniseries Penn. While Mani Ratnam worked on writing the film's city portions, Azhagam Perumal wrote the portions set in the village. R. Madhavan, who played the lead role in Mani Ratnam's previous project Alaipayuthey (2000), was signed on to play the lead role alongside actress Jyothika. It was initially reported that Madras Talkies had signed on composer Dhina to work on the film's soundtrack, but he was later replaced by Karthik Raja.

A song sequence was shot at Thanjavur Periya Koil and became the final film to shoot there until Kandaen released in 2011. The film had a premiere on 13 April 2001 at Sathyam Cinemas in aid of the Ability Foundation, an organisation working for the welfare of the disabled.

== Soundtrack ==
Dumm Dumm Dumm

Soundtrack album by Karthik Raja
- Released: 16 February 2001
- Genre: Film soundtrack
- Labels: Saregama, Cee (I) TV Audio

Karthik Raja chronology
| Ullam Kollai Poguthae (2001) | Dumm Dumm Dumm (2001) | Mitr, My Friend (2001) |

The soundtrack album for Dumm Dumm Dumm features six songs composed by Karthik Raja. Indiainfo praised the album, stating: "Once again the album does justice to the film producer Manirathnam whose music sense has always been above par. Karthik Raja is a talented son of a talented father".

Track listing
| Title | Singers | Lyricist |
|---|---|---|
| "Desingu Raja" | Sujatha, Harish Raghavendra | Na. Muthukumar |
| "Suttrum Bhoomi" | Harini, Chorus | Na. Muthukumar |
| "Un Perai Sonnale" | P. Unnikrishnan, Sadhana Sargam | Na. Muthukumar |
| "Ragasiyamai" | Sadhana Sargam, Hariharan, Ramanathan | Na. Muthukumar |
| "Krishna Krishna" | Karthik, Febi Mani, Harish Raghavendra | Vaali |
| "Athan Varuvaga" | Harini, Tippu, T. K. Karthik, Chitra Sivaraman, Malgudi Subha | Pa. Vijay |

== Release and reception ==
Upon release on 13 April 2001, Dumm Dumm Dumm garnered predominantly positive feedback from critics. Chennai Online wrote "It is a youthful, clean entertainer from debutant director Azhagam Perumal. The film begins a little differently, the first part interspersed with enjoyable humour. Some of the scenes and song picturisation (like, 'Deising Raja….', the catchy tunes by Kartik Raja) have the Manirathnam touch. Not surprising, since the director has had his apprenticeship with Manirathnam. It is after the story shifts to the city that the narration lags a little and becomes confused". The critic from Rediff.com cited that the film "has what it takes to come up with a box office bonanza" and said that "the real star, though, is director Azhagam Perumal." Furthermore, the reviewer praised R. Madhavan and Jyothika, the lead pair, as "perfectly cast, and perform as per expectations," whilst labeling that Murali delivered a "measured performance." The Hindu's verdict was that the film was "a neat entertainer that seems to lose focus on and off," whilst drawing particular praise for the performance of the leading actors. New Straits Times wrote "Dumm Dumm Dumm is a surprisingly good effort from a new director and one suspects Maniratnam had a close hand in guiding him". Likewise, a reviewer from Screen noted "Azhagam Perumal has shown a good grasp of the medium and the ability to finely blend the rustic charm and city slickness in a love story extracting fine performance from the lead pair, Madhavan and Jyothika." Cinesouth wrote "The tempo of the film has been maintained throughout as Selvaraj, Manirathnam and Alagam perumal have combined their brainwork very efficiently with regard to story, screenplay and direction. But more care could have been given to the final scenes. The Cinematography by Ramji and the edit by Sridhar Prasad are commendable." Visual Dasan of Kalki praised the performances of Madhavan, Jyothika and other actors and also praised the director for directing the film well. Indiainfo wrote "The film has not much of a storyline but the director scores in the screenplay and makes an impact extracting good performances from the artistes. Karthik Raaja's music, Ramji's camera and good choreography add to the film's entertainment value".

The film went on to become a commercially successful venture at the Tamil Nadu box office. Subsequently, the film was later dubbed and released in Telugu as Dum Dum Dum. It subsequently was awarded with several Cinema Express Awards and was the most awarded film at the award function with Karthik Raja winning Best Tamil Music Director Award for his work.
