= Kannan Varuvaan (2000 film) =

2000 film by Sundar C

- Poster
- Directed by: Sundar C
- Written by: D. Singapuli (dialogues)
- Screenplay by: Sundar C
- Story by: D. Singapuli
- Produced by: K. Muralidharan; V. Swaminathan; G. Venugopal
- Starring: Karthik; Manthra; Divya Unni
- Cinematography: U. K. Senthil Kumar
- Edited by: P. Sai Suresh
- Music by: Sirpy
- Production company: Lakshmi Movie Makers
- Release date: 25 May 2000
- Running time: 136 minutes
- Country: India
- Language: Tamil

Kannan Varuvaan (transl. Kannan will come) is a 2000 Indian Tamil-language film written and directed by Sundar C. The film stars Karthik, Manthra and Divyaa Unni, while Goundamani, Senthil, Manorama, Ranjith and Radha Ravi play supporting roles. The music was composed by Sirpy with editing by P. Sai Suresh and cinematography by U. K. Senthil Kumar. The film was released on 25 May 2000.

== Plot ==
Kannan's ambition in life is to take up the construction of the temple left incomplete by his forefathers. Unfortunately, funds are not forthcoming. Thannirmalai assures Kannan that with his employer's help, Kannan's dream will become a reality. Unfortunately for Thannirmalai, he becomes disappointed when his employer, the wealthy landlady Ranganayagi's grandson Raghu, turns out to be money-minded and heartless. In a fit of anger, Thannirmalai pushes Raghu into a river and thinks that he has committed a murder. Kannan is made to enter the scene as an impostor by pretending to be Raghu. Meanwhile, there is a love triangle between Kannan, Rajeswari and Parvathi. What follows forms the crux of the story.

== Cast ==
- Karthik as Kannan/Raghu
- Manthra as Rajeshwari
- Divya Unni as Parvathi (Voice dubbed by Jayageetha)
- Goundamani as Thannirmalai/Adiyapatham/Ezhumalai
- Manorama as Ranganayaki (Aatha)
- Ranjith as Raghu
- Radha Ravi
- Senthil as Sooravali
- Kazan Khan as Raja
- Ishari K. Ganesh as Government Servant
- Mayilsamy
- Theni Kunjarammal
- Periya Karuppu Thevar
- Balu Anand
- Vichu Vishwanath
- Halwa Vasu
- Nellai Siva
- K. S. Jayalakshmi
- Chelladurai as Parvathi's uncle
- Sujith Sagar as Collector
- Vijay Ganesh as Servant
- Anuja
- Deepika
- Ravichandran
- Amulraj Vaathiyar
- Soori as Man in a temple (uncredited)

== Production ==
Kannan Varuvaan features Soori in his first speaking role. Karthik, who previously appeared in Sundar's Ullathai Allitha (1996), Mettukudi (1996) and Unakkaga Ellam Unakkaga (1999) reunited with the director.

== Soundtrack ==
The soundtrack was composed by Sirpy. Chennai Online wrote, "Despite the bunch of talented singers, music director Sirpi lets us down with a very mediocre score".

Song	Singers	Lyrics
"Kadala Kaattu Kuyile"	Shankar Mahadevan, Sujatha	P. Vijay
"Kaatrukku Pookal"	Hariharan, Sujatha	P. Vijay
"Kattraruntha Thendrale"	Shankar Mahadevan	Palani Bharathi
"Kooda Mela"	S. P. B. Charan, Yugendran, K. S. Chithra	P. Vijay
"Seeraga Samba"	S. Janaki, S. P. Balasubrahmanyam	Palani Bharathi
"Vennilavae Vennilavae"	Hariharan	Palani Bharathi

== Reception ==
K. N. Vijiyan of New Straits Times criticised the film's lack of originality, but said the presence of Karthik, Divya and Goundamani saves the film. Malathi Rangarajan of The Hindu wrote, "The story and dialogue by Singapuli are too cliched to prove interesting. And Sundar C.'s screenplay and direction do not do much to elevate the film either". Tamil Star wrote, "Either director Sunder C .has exhausted all his ideas, or is never tired of repeating the same sequences and characters from film to film. [Kannan Varuvaan] is a film to be avoided like the plague". Krishna Chidambaram of Kalki wrote he is tired of seeing Karthik acting in the same kind of roles, called Radha Ravi's villainy as funny and felt since everything seems to be predictable, Goundamani's comedy track had too much of spice. Indiainfo wrote, "Sundar, who is known to come up with some good comedy situations even if the storyline is stale, falls flat here. So, be prepared for a big yawn".
