= Kathirunda Kadhal =

- Poster
- Directed by: Vijayeswaran
- Written by: Vijayeswaran
- Produced by: N. Prabhavathy, N. Jothi Lakshmi, N. Vishnuram, N. Raghuram
- Starring: Arun Vijay; Suvalakshmi; Dimple
- Cinematography: S.D. Vijay Milton
- Edited by: M. N. Raja
- Music by: Sirpy
- Production company: Ganga Gowri Productions
- Release date: 14 January 1997
- Running time: 130 minutes
- Country: India
- Language: Tamil

Kathirunda Kadhal (transl. Love that waited) is a 1997 Indian Tamil-language romantic drama film directed by Vijayeswaran and produced by Ganga Gowri Productions. The film featured Arun Vijay (credited as Arun Kumar) alongside Suvalakshmi, while Dimple plays a supporting role. It was released on 14 January 1997.

== Cast ==
- Arun Vijay as Mayilsamy
- Suvalakshmi as Indhu
- Dimple
- M. N. Nambiar
- Nizhalgal Ravi
- Jaishankar
- Sukumari
- Charle as Pavadai
- Malaysia Vasudevan
- Vizhuthugal Latha

== Soundtrack ==
The music was composed by Sirpy, with lyrics by Palani Bharathi.

Song	Singers
"Alai Alai"	Sujatha, Mano
"Dhavani Devathai"	Mano
"Irin Scalila"	Mano
"Kangalil Vanthaval"	Mano
"Many Many"	Mano, K. S. Chithra
"Sir Uh Porandha"	K. S. Chithra

== Release and reception ==
The film was released on 14 January 1997, and fared poorly at the box office. A critic from Cinema Express wrote that "'Ganga Gowri Productions' which had such great hits like 'Ullaththai Allithaa' and 'Meetukkudi'.. has decided to make this film their 'dhristi parigaaram'".
