= Karthik (actor) =

Indian actor (born 1960)

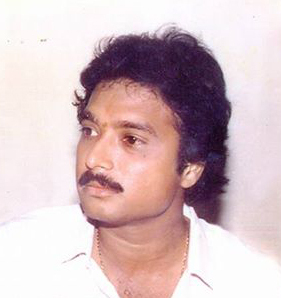
- Karthik at an event
- Born: Murali Karthikeyan Muthuraman; 13 September 1960 (age 66); Udhagamandalam, Tamil Nadu, India
- Other names: Navarasa Nayagan; Murali
- Education: The New College, Chennai
- Occupations: Actor; playback singer; politician
- Years active: 1981–2007; 2010–present
- Spouses: Ragini (m. 1989); Rathi (m. 1992)
- Children: 3, including Gautham Karthik
- Father: R. Muthuraman

Murali Karthikeyan Muthuraman (born 13 September 1960), better known by his stage name Karthik, is an Indian actor, playback singer and politician who works in Tamil cinema. He is the son of veteran actor R. Muthuraman. Karthik was one of the prominent stars in the industry in the 80s and 90s. He was first introduced by Bharathiraja in the Tamil film Alaigal Oivathillai (1981) and became a lead actor in Tamil films eventually. He has also appeared in some Telugu films where he was initially credited as Murali. Karthik is known in the industry as Navarasa Nayagan, as he is often appreciated for his ability to emote all forms of actions and emotions. He has acted in more than 125 films. He has been the recipient of four Tamil Nadu State Film Awards, a Nandi Award and four Filmfare Awards South.

== Early life and background ==
Karthik was born as Murali Karthikeyan Muthuraman on 13 September 1960. He was born into a Tamil Hindu family in Ooty to veteran actor R. Muthuraman and Sulochana. He has two sons, Gautham and Ghayn, from his first marriage with Ragini, and another son, Thiran, from his second marriage with Rathi.

== Film career ==
=== Debut and success (1981–1986) ===
Karthik was first introduced in Tamil cinema by Bharathiraja in the Tamil film Alaigal Oivathillai (1981). Bharathiraja gave him the stage name, Karthik. He received the Best New Face Award from the Tamil Nadu Government in 1981. He starred in the Telugu version of the film Seethakoka Chilaka that same year under the stage name Murali. He collaborated with leading film directors such as Mani Ratnam, Bharathiraja, Visu, R. Sundarrajan, Ameerjan, R. V. Udayakumar, Priyadarshan, Fazil, Vikraman, Agathiyan, Sundar C, K. S. Ravikumar, P. Vasu and K. V. Anand.

During the earlier stages of his career, Karthik worked three times with R. V. Udaya Kumar. Later, he formed a partnership with Goundamani in many comedy films. He was also well received by the Tamil audience for his performance in Nallavanukku Nallavan (1984) in a role against Rajinikanth. During the early to mid '80s he did many films of which Bhagavathipuram Railway Gate (1983), Pei Veedu (1984) and Raja Thanthiram (1984) were typical low budget masala films and failed to make a mark. His onscreen pairing with Radha was appreciated in the early '80s. He garnered acclaim for his role in the Telugu thriller Anveshana by Vamsy and his cameo in Mouna Ragam (1986) was well received by the audience.

=== Golden years (1987–1991) ===
Post his performance in Mani Ratnam's, 1986 classic Mouna Ragam, Karthik acted in numerous performance-oriented films. To begin with Vanna Kanavugal (1987) was a super hit and marked beginnings of Karthik as a performance artist. He's said to have captured the soul of the audience with his subtle yet powerful acting style. He collaborated with several leading directors since 1987 and created several successful films. He acted in the Telugu film Abhinandana (1988) for which he won the Nandi Special Jury Award. He pursued strong performance-oriented characters in commercial successes like Agni Natchathiram (1988), Varusham Padhinaaru (1989), Idhaya Thamarai (1990), Kizhakku Vaasal (1990) and culminated with the black comedy Gopura Vasalile (1991).

=== Ups and downs (1992–1995) ===
This was period when Karthik took considerable risks in choosing scripts. Amaran (1992) was an action film where Karthik plays an orphan who eventually becomes a don. When it released, it performed below expectations; however, the song sung by Karthik became a huge rage: 'Vethala Potta Sokkula', one of the super hit songs that Adithyan tuned was sung in his signature style very similar to his dialogue delivery. The song is a 'love at first sight' kind and its simplicity and very hummable lyrics is what endeared it to many when it was first released. Nadodi Thendral (1992) was a period film helmed by Bharathiraja. Ponnumani (1993) was a village-based melodrama, which was a super hit at the box office and fetched Karthik his fourth Filmfare award. Karthik also spent a considerable amount of time shooting for a Telugu film co-starring Vijayashanti in Maga Rayudu (1994). This period also witnessed films like Marumagan (1995), Chakravarthy (1995), Nandhavana Theru (1995) and an average success Thotta Chinungi (1995).

=== Breakout and consolidation years (1996–1999) ===
In 1996, Karthik appeared in Kizhakku Mugam. In the same year, he acted in his biggest commercial success: the full-length comedy Sundar C's Ullathai Allitha, alongside Rambha and Goundamani. Due to the success, he collaborated with the director again in another profitable venture, Mettukudi. He went on to win critical acclaim for his role in Gokulathil Seethai. The film went on to win the Tamil Nadu State Film award for showcasing women in good light, crediting actors for their empathetic performance. Karthik may not have won an award for his performance, but his ability to play a drunk, ruthless playboy and with relative ease segueing in to a role that respects women. He appeared in K. S. Ravikumar's Pistha (1997), which also received good reviews. Karthik carried on his good streak at the box office in 1998, while also winning accolades for his performances in Cheyyar Ravi's Harichandra (1998), Vikraman's Unnidathil Ennai Koduthen (1998) (his 100th film), and Selva's Pooveli (1998), and won a Tamil Nadu State Award for Best Actor for both Pooveli and Unnidathil Ennai Koduthen. In 1999, he appeared in drama films like Chinna Raja, Nilave Mugam Kaattu, Anandha Poongatre, Suyamvaram and Rojavanam. He acted in medium-budget comedy films, notably in four further Sundar C ventures including the successful blockbuster film, Unakkaga Ellam Unakkaga (1999). His pairing with Rambha was a hit with the audience as the pair provided good hits in the late 1990s.

=== Downfall begins (2000–2001) ===
During the early 2000s, Karthik experienced a difficult period as he began to lose his popularity at the box office and new actors began to emerge in the Tamil film industry. Many family films came but nothing different were noticed or not one performance was talked about. Such films include Thai Poranthachu (2000), Sandhitha Velai (2000), Kannan Varuvaan (2000), Kuberan (2000) and Seenu (2000). Films including Prabhu Nepal's Kadhale Swasam alongside Meena, Sundar C's Kadhal Solla Vandhen with Isha Koppikar and Gowri Manohar's Kashmir with Priyanka Trivedi had audio release events but failed to have a theatrical release. Likewise, other ventures including Mahesh's Manathil alongside Kausalya, Soundarrajan's Click co-starring Prabhu, and Selva's Kai Korthu Vaa progressed before being halted. Similarly, other projects in the early 2000s, such as Gurudeva with Rimjim, Muthalaam Santhippil with Kausalya again and Enrum Unnai Naesippaen were dropped soon after filming had begun. Potential home productions such as Tension and Avan Appadithaan under his banner Aalamara Films also did not materialise. In 2001, his films were Ullam Kollai Poguthae, Lovely and Azhagana Naatkal.

=== Years in wilderness (2002–2007) ===
He starred in an action film, Devan with Vijayakanth and Arun Pandian, followed by Game. During the nadir of 2002, Karthik was signed on by producer Keyaar to make a film titled Enna Peyar Veikalaam directed by Vincent Selva. Despite travelling to Pollachi for the shoot, the actor refused to emerge from his hotel room, and following an extended period of confusion, the film was called off and the Nadigar Sangam began legal proceedings against the actor. In 2003, Karthik acted in the crime film, Indru. The film was a disaster at the box office for him.

Towards the nadir of 2005, he signed on to appear in a negative role in Sathyaraj's Sivalingam IPS, but the film was shelved. In 2004, Karthik suggested that "his acts and habits" had landed him in trouble and was looking to make a comeback. He subsequently appeared in "comeback" films such as Kusthi (2006) and Kalakkura Chandru (2007), both of which had delayed releases and went unnoticed at the box office. Other ventures that the actor described as "comeback projects", such as Kicha's Unnidathil and Raj Kapoor's Sivalingam IPS, were shelved mid-production. Later in 2006, he revealed that he had quit taking drugs and was keen to make another attempt at returning to the film industry.

=== Renewal (2010–2013) ===
Karthik opted to make a comeback into acting in 2010 and chose to appear in supporting rather than leading roles, much like his contemporaries Prabhu and Sathyaraj. He was first seen portraying a caring police officer in Maanja Velu, before winning positive reviews for his small role as a forest guard in Mani Ratnam's Raavanan. He subsequently went on to play roles in P. Vasu's Puli Vesham (2011) and the Telugu film Om 3D (2013), both of which failed at the box office.

=== Revival and comeback (2015–present) ===
He acted in as the main antagonist in K. V. Anand's Anegan, where he appears alongside Dhanush. He acted with Suriya in Thaanaa Serndha Koottam (2018), and his son Gautham Karthik in Mr. Chandramouli (2018). He made a guest appearance with actor Karthi in the film, Dev (2019). He played a supporting role as veteran actor with his same name, old movie posters, songs, background montages and movie scenes in the Prashanth starrer movie Andhagan in 2024 and got good acclaims for his performance.

== Political career ==
Karthik entered politics ahead of the 2006 Tamil Nadu Legislative Assembly election. He joined the All India Forward Bloc and was appointed as the Secretary of the Tamil Nadu state unit of the party. He led the party during its electoral campaign on 24 September 2006. He later launched his own party Ahila India Naadalum Makkal Katchi in 2009 before the Lok Sabha elections. He contested from Virudhunagar constituency and got only 15,000 votes. He started another party named Manitha Urimaigal Kaakkum Katchi on 15 December 2018 at Tirunelveli before the Lok Sabha elections and he voiced his support for AIADMK alliance.

=== 2011 Assembly elections ===
Karthik's party tried an alliance with AIADMK for the 2011 Assembly elections, but AIADMK supremo denied tickets for his party. Karthik announced his party will contest alone in 25 to 40 constituencies after it was not allotted any seat in the AIADMK coalition. Karthik sat on a fast in Madurai demanding Madurai Airport be renamed as Pasumpon Thevar Airport. His party with sizeable Thevar votes in southern Tamil Nadu is believed to eat into the AIADMK votebank. In 2006, former AIADMK minister Nainar Nagendran lost by 2,000 votes in Tirunelveli, where Karthik's party polled more than the margin. Two weeks later, he split from AIADMK and announced his party will contest independently in 19 constituencies and support DMK in 213 constituencies.

== Awards ==
Filmfare Awards South

- 1988 – Filmfare Award for Best Actor – Tamil – Agni Natchathiram
- 1989 – Filmfare Award for Best Actor – Tamil – Varusham Padhinaaru
- 1990 – Filmfare Award for Best Actor – Tamil – Kizhakku Vasal
- 1993 – Filmfare Award for Best Actor – Tamil – Ponnumani

Tamil Nadu State Film Awards

- 1981 – Best Male Debut Award – Alaigal Oivathillai
- 1988 – Special Prize for Best Actor – Agni Natchathiram
- 1990 – Tamil Nadu State Film Award for Best Actor – Kizhakku Vasal
- 1998 – Special Prize for Best Actor – Pooveli and Unnidathil Ennai Koduthen

Cinema Express Awards

- 1998 – Cinema Express Award for Best Actor – Tamil – Unnidathil Ennai Koduthen

Nandi Awards

- 1988 – Nandi Special Jury Award – Abhinandana

== Personal life ==
He married actress Ragini in 1989, his co-star in the film Solaikuyil and the couple has two sons, actor Gautham Karthik and Ghayn Karthik. He married her sister, Rathi, in 1992 and the couple has a son, Thiran Karthik.

== Filmography ==
=== Tamil films ===
Year	Title	Role	Notes
1981	Alaigal Oivathillai	Vichu	Tamil Nadu State Film Award for Best Male Debut
1982	Ilanjodigal	Ramu	
1982	Neram Vandhachu	Raja	
1982	Kelviyum Naane Pathilum Naane	Nirmal, Babu	
1982	Thaai Mookaambikai	Muthu	Guest appearance
1982	Ninaivellam Nithya	Chandru	
1982	Kanne Radha	Nagarajan "Raja"	
1982	Pakkathu Veetu Roja	Kannan	
1982	Valibamey Vaa Vaa	Karthik	
1982	Adhisayappiravigal	Thangamuthu	
1982	Agaya Gangai	Murali	
1983	Marupatta Konangal	Karthik	
1983	Oru Kai Pappom	Jayaraman	
1983	Bhagavathipuram Railway Gate	Conductor	
1983	Aayiram Nilave Vaa	Chandhar, Soori	Dual role
1983	Apoorva Sahodarigal	Ravi	
1983	Dhooram Adhighamillai	Araamuthu	
1984	Rajathanthiram	Ilaiya Boopathy	
1984	Ninaivugal	Kannan	
1984	Nandri	Shankar	
1984	Nallavanuku Nallavan	Vinod	
1984	Pei Veedu	Thyagu	
1984	Puyal Kadantha Bhoomi	Murali	
1985	Nalla Thambi	Raju	
1985	Viswanathan Velai Venum	Ashok	
1985	Mookkanan Kaiyiru	Bhaskar	
1985	Puthiya Sagaptham	Deepak	Guest appearance
1985	Aval Sumangalithan	Bhaskaran	
1985	Arthamulla Aasaigal	Selvam	
1985	Ketti Melam	Vasu	
1986	Dharma Pathini	Inspector Prem Kumar	
1986	Natpu	Vanchinathan	
1986	Mouna Ragam	Manohar	Guest appearance
1986	Oomai Vizhigal	Ramesh	Guest appearance
1986	Thodarum Uravu		
1987	Raja Mariyadhai	Raguram	
1987	Velicham	Ashok Kumar	
1987	Nalla Pambu	Raja	
1987	Thaye Neeye Thunai	Karthik	
1987	Ore Ratham	Mahesh	
1987	Kavalan Avan Kovalan	Himself	Guest appearance
1987	Dhoorathu Pachai	Karthik	
1987	Veeran Veluthambi	Thirumalai	Guest appearance
1987	Vanna Kanavugal	Kannappan	
1987	Parisam Pottachu	Murali	
1987	Enga Veettu Ramayanan	Murali	
1988	Solla Thudikuthu Manasu	P. G. Thilainathan	
1988	Urimai Geetham	Chandru	
1988	Kan Simittum Neram	Raja (Kannan)	
1988	Agni Natchathiram	Ashok	Filmfare Award for Best Actor – Tamil; Tamil Nadu State Film Award Special Prize for Best Actor
1988	En Jeevan Paduthu	Surendran	
1988	Kalicharan	Raja	
1989	Varusham Padhinaaru	Kannan	Filmfare Award for Best Actor – Tamil
1989	Sattathin Thirappu Vizhaa	Rajesh	
1989	Solaikuyil	Inspector Maruthu	
1989	Paandi Nattu Thangam	Forest Ranger Thangapandian	
1989	Rettai Kuzhal Thuppakki	Velu	
1989	Thiruppu Munai	Rajaram / Vanchinathan IPS	
1990	Idhaya Thamarai	Vijay	
1990	Mr. Karthik	Karthik	
1990	Unnai Solli Kutramillai	Balu	
1990	Kalyana Rasi	Murali	
1990	Periya Veetu Pannakkaran	Sundara Pandi	
1990	Kizhakku Vasal	Ponnurangam	Filmfare Award for Best Actor – Tamil; Tamil Nadu State Film Award for Best Actor
1990	Ethir Kaatru	Ram Narendran	
1990	Engal Swamy Ayyappan	Himself	Guest appearance
1991	Vanakkam Vathiyare	Rajappa	
1991	Irumbu Pookkal	Dharma	
1991	Gopura Vasalile	Manohar	
1991	Vigneshwar	ACP Vigneshwar IPS	
1992	Amaran	Amaran	
1992	Unna Nenachen Pattu Padichen	Muthurasu	
1992	Nadodi Thendral	Thangarasu	
1992	Nadodi Pattukkaran	Sundaram	
1992	Idhu Namma Bhoomi	Gopi	
1992	Suyamariyadhai	ACP Vijay IPS	
1992	Deiva Vaakku	Thambi Durai	
1993	Chinna Kannamma	Aravind	
1993	Ponnumani	Ponnumani	Filmfare Award for Best Actor – Tamil
1993	Chinna Jameen	Raasaiyya	
1993	Kathirukka Neramillai	Raju, Somasekhar	
1994	Seeman	Seeman	
1994	Ilaignar Ani	Prisoner	Guest appearance
1995	Muthu Kaalai	Muthu Kaalai	
1995	Lucky Man	Gopi	
1995	Nandhavana Theru	Seenu	
1995	Marumagan	Thangarasu	
1995	Chakravarthy	Inspector Chakravarthy	
1995	Thotta Chinungi	Mano	
1996	Kizhakku Mugam	Venu	
1996	Ullathai Allitha	Rajasekhar	
1996	Katta Panchayathu	Rajadurai	
1996	Poovarasan	Poovarasan	
1996	Mettukudi	Raja	
1996	Gokulathil Seethai	Rishi	
1997	Sishya	Aravind	
1997	Pistha	Manikandan	
1998	Udhavikku Varalaamaa	Muthurasu (Pichumani, Hussain and James)	
1998	Sundara Pandian	Sundar, Pandi	
1998	Harichandra	Harichandra	
1998	Unnidathil Ennai Koduthen	Selvam	100th Film; Cinema Express Award for Best Actor – Tamil; Tamil Nadu State Film Award Special Prize for Best Actor
1998	Pooveli	Murali	Tamil Nadu State Film Award Special Prize for Best Actor
1999	Chinna Raja	Raja / Dilip	
1999	Nilave Mugam Kaattu	Murthy (Govind)	
1999	Anandha Poongatre	Haridas	
1999	Suyamvaram	Ram Kumar	
1999	Rojavanam	Muthu	
1999	Poovellam Kettuppar	Himself	Guest appearance
1999	Unakkaga Ellam Unakkaga	Sakthivel	
2000	Thai Poranthachu	Aravind	Guest appearance
2000	Sandhitha Velai	Aadalarasu, Thirunaavukkarasu	
2000	Kannan Varuvaan	Kannan	
2000	Kuberan	Kuberan	
2000	Seenu	Seenu	
2001	Ullam Kollai Poguthae	Gautham	Guest appearance
2001	Lovely	Chandru	
2001	Azhagana Naatkal	Chandru	
2002	Devan	Chakravarthy	Guest appearance
2002	Game	Raja	
2003	Indru	Goutham	
2006	Kusthi	Singam	
2007	Kalakkura Chandru	Chandru	
2010	Maanja Velu	ACP Subash Chandra Bose	
2010	Raavanan	Ganaprakasam	
2011	Puli Vesham	ACP Easwaran Moorthy	
2015	Anegan	Ravikiran	
2018	Thaana Serndha Kootam	Kurunjivendhan	
2018	Mr. Chandramouli	Mr. Chandramouli	
2019	Dev	Ashok	Guest appearance
2023	Thee Ivan	Muthusamy	
2024	Andhagan	Karthik	Guest appearance

=== Telugu films ===
Year	Title	Role	Notess
1981	Seethakoka Chiluka	Raghu	credited as Murali
1984	Veerabhadrudu		
1984	Anubandham	Satya Murthy	
1985	Anveshana	Amar	credited as Murali
1986	Punyasthree	Bhaskar	
1988	Abhinandana	Raja	Nandi Special Jury Award
1989	Gopala Rao Gari Abbayi	Raghu	
1994	Maga Rayudu	Karthik	
2013	Om 3D	Harischandra Prasad	

=== As singer ===
Year	Title	Song	Music director	Co-singer
1992	Amaran	"Vethala Potta Sokkula", "Musthafa"	Adithyan	
1992	Suyamariyadhai	"Vanmedu Megham"	Shivajiraaja	Malaysia Vasudevan
1993	Chinna Jameen	"Onappu Thattu"	Ilaiyaraaja	Swarnalatha
1997	Sishya	"Apollo Apollo"	Deva	Swarnalatha
1997	Pistha	"Kozhi Curry Kondu Varatta"	S. A. Rajkumar	
1998	Pooveli	"Kathai Sollapporaen"	Bharadwaj	Nizhalgal Ravi, Charle, Manorama
1998	Harichandra	"Harichandran Varaan"	Gopal Rao, Shaleen Sharma, R. Anandh	Gopal Rao
