= Nandi Awards of 1987 =

Indian Telugu film and TV awards ceremony

Nandi Awards presented annually by Government of Andhra Pradesh. First awarded in 1964.

== 1987 Nandi Awards Winners List ==
Category	Winner	Film
Best Feature Film	K. Viswanath	Sruthilayalu
Second Best Feature Film	Ashok Kumar	Abhinandana
Third Best Feature Film	Paruchuri brothers	Prajasvamyam
