= Kannan Varuvan =

Kannan Varuvan (alternatively Varuvaan) may refer to:

- Kannan Varuvan (1970 film)
- Kannan Varuvaan (2000 film)
