= Halwa Vasu =

Indian comedian (died 2017)

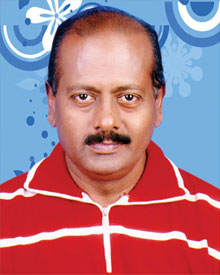
- Born: Vasu; 1960; Madurai
- Died: 17 August 2017 (aged 56–57); Madurai, India
- Occupation: Actor
- Years active: 1984–2017
- Spouse: Amutha

Vasu, popularly known as Halwa Vasu, (died 17 August 2017) was a comedian in the Tamil film industry in India. He worked in around 900 films.

== Career ==
Vasu who hailed from Madurai district, came to Chennai to work in cinemas after his graduation. Vasu worked as an assistant to director-actor Manivannan, he carved a niche for himself in comedy films and has also acted alongside the likes of Vadivelu. He was given the name "Halwa Vasu" after the film Amaidhi Padai (1994), in which he brings halwa which is adulterated with abin, a drug, by the antagonist in the movie who uses it to rape an innocent girl.

He was also known for his popular dialogue "Moonji Sir Moonji Sila Moonjigala Paartha Thaan Korthuvidanum pola thonoom" during his conversation with Vadivelu in the film Chatrapathy (2004), where Vasu manipulates Vadivelu to sell all the equipments which he intentionally lie as those machines have the ability to trace and identity genuine currency notes from counterfeit currency notes. In the comedy sequence, Vasu initially comes off as a genuine guy who pretends to help Vadivelu by setting up a side business giving him words of wisdom and advises about how to be a productive human being by learning and mastering the art of work ethics and honing the skillsets in labour market.

His performance as a comedy sidekick to veteran comedian Vadivelu in Ellam Avan Seyal (2008) was lauded and appreciated by the audience. In one of the comedy track sequences, Halwa Vasu and Bava Lakshmanan's hilarious response to Vadivelu when asked by Vadivelu about whether they got jaamin (transl. bail) in order to release him from police custody became immensely popular due to the mannerism shown by Bava Lakshmanan and Halwa Vasu during their response even amidst the intensity of the situation inside a police station. Halwa Vasu eventually gives a finishing touch by hilariously telling "Kadallaye Illeyam", referring to how he and Bava went in search of bail in a fish market.

== Death ==
He was hospitalized at Madurai Meenakshi Mission Hospital for some time but died due to liver failure at his home in Rukmani Palayam Munichalai on 17 August 2017. His funeral and cremation was held in Thathaneri electric crematorium.

== Selected filmography ==
=== Films ===
- Kuva Kuva Vaathugal (1984)
- Vaazhkai Chakkaram (1990)
- Sandhana Kaatru (1990)
- Pudhu Manithan (1991)
- Vetri Padigal (1991)
- Marikozhundhu (1991)
- Therku Theru Machan (1992)
- Unnai Vaazhthi Paadugiren (1992)
- Government Mappillai (1992)
- Moondravadhu Kann (1993)
- Amaidhi Padai (1994)
- Rasa Magan (1994)
- Chinna Mani (1995)
- Gangai Karai Paattu (1995)
- Thamizhachi (1995)
- Maaman Magal (1995)
- Murai Mappillai (1995)
- Villadhi Villain (1995)
- Mettukudi (1996)
- Gopura Deepam (1997)
- Arunachalam (1997)
- Vivasaayi Magan (1997)
- Periya Idathu Mappillai (1997)
- Periya Manushan (1997)
- Pudhalvan (1997)
- Dhinamdhorum (1998)
- Ninaithen Vandhai (1998)
- Iniyavale (1998)
- Moovendhar (1998)
- Kannathal (1998)
- Unnai Thedi (1999)
- Poomagal Oorvalam (1999)
- Vaalee (1999)
- Suyamvaram (1999)
- Kannodu Kanbathellam (1999)
- Azhagarsamy (1999)
- Annai (2000)
- Kannan Varuvaan (2000)
- Citizen (2001)
- Kottai Mariamman (2001)
- Karmegham (2002)
- Anbu (2003)
- Student Number 1 (2003)
- Magic Magic 3D (2003)
- Diwan (2003)
- Winner (2003)
- Thathi Thavadhu Manasu (2003)
- Gomathi Nayagam (2004)
- Maayavi (2005)
- Englishkaran (2005)
- Kaatrullavarai (2005)
- February 14 (2005)
- Chanakya (2005)
- Mazhai (2005)
- ABCD (2005)
- Aanai (2005)
- Aaru (2005)
- Vetrivel Sakthivel (2005)
- Veeranna (2005)
- Pasa Kiligal (2006)
- Kovai Brothers (2006)
- Sudesi (2006)
- Thalainagaram (2006)
- Imsai Arasan 23rd Pulikecei (2006)
- Sillunu Oru Kaadhal (2006)
- Kurukshetram (2006)
- Karuppusamy Kuththagaithaarar (2007)
- Vel (2007)
- Manikanda (2007)
- Piragu (2007)
- Indiralohathil Na Azhagappan (2008)
- Kannum Kannum (2008)
- Pandi (2008)
- Kathavarayan (2008)
- Kee Mu (2008)
- Pattaya Kelappu (2008)
- Velvi (2008)
- Theeyavan (2008)
- Ellam Avan Seyal (2008)
- Vedigundu Murugesan (2009)
- Kanthaswamy (2009)
- Kannukulle (2009)
- Vedappan (2009)
- Tamizh Padam (2010)
- Sura (2010)
- Pollachi Mappillai (2010)
- Neeyum Naanum (2010)
- Mandhira Punnagai (2010)
- Nagaram Marupakkam (2010)
- Chikku Bukku (2010)
- Aadukalam (2011)
- Kazhugu (2012)
- Yugam (2012)
- Sonna Puriyathu (2013)
- Masani (2013)
- Ner Ethir (2014)
- Tenaliraman (2014) (uncredited)
- Agathinai (2015)
- Visaranai (2015)
- Peigal Jaakkirathai (2016)
- Savarikkadu (2017)
- Naan Avalai Sandhitha Pothu (2019)
- Sollunganne Sollunga (2020)

=== Television ===
- Mama Maaple as Doctor
- Kanaa Kaanum Kalangal Kalloori Saalai as Vasu

=== Dubbing artist ===
- Ullathai Allitha (1996) - Rambha (for scene where Rambha disguises as a thief)
