= Pistha (1997 film) =

1997 film by K. S. Ravikumar

- DVD cover
- Directed by: K. S. Ravikumar
- Screenplay by: K. S. Ravikumar
- Story by: M. A. Kennedy
- Produced by: Pyramid Natarajan
- Starring: Karthik; Nagma
- Cinematography: Ashok Rajan
- Edited by: K. Thanikachalam
- Music by: S. A. Rajkumar
- Production company: Pyramid Films International
- Release date: 9 May 1997
- Running time: 152 minutes
- Country: India
- Language: Tamil

Pistha (transl. Crook lit. 'Pistachio') is a 1997 Indian Tamil-language comedy film directed by K. S. Ravikumar and produced by Pyramid Natarajan, starring Karthik and Nagma in the lead roles. The film was released on 9 May 1997 and became a major success. The film was remade in Kannada as Rusthum (2001).

== Plot ==
Manigandan is a server in a hotel who is a devotee of Ayyappan (the bachelor god). He follows a fasting for Ayyappan and is very sincere and honest. One day, a businessman, named Dharmaraj visits the hotel where Manigandan works. He admires Manigandan's sincerity and offers him the general manager job in his factory at Ooty. Dharmaraj takes Manigandan to his factory and office to introduce him to his employees who do not do any work but remain unproductive. An innocent Mani does not understand why employees do not work but gets scared that he must manage all of them, a task which was impossible for 419 managers before him.

Manigandan sees a woman who breaks everything she sees, and yet Dharmaraj pays for everything she breaks. He finds out that she is Vennila, daughter of Dharmaraj who is a spoilt woman who cannot be controlled even by her father. Manigandan and Vennila fight frequently. Vennila makes every attempt to get rid of him, but a spark develops between them.

Vennila visits the home of her sister's lover to give money for their expenses. She finds out that she must inherit all her grandfather's property if she can continue to afford money for them. The only way to inherit the property is to get married as per his will. She wants to help her sister, so decides to marry Manigandan and attempts to win his heart. Manigandan also declares his love for Vennila but Dharmaraj objects to the match as Vennila is very dangerous girl and she might spoil his life. He is reluctantly persuaded to accept the marriage, and Manigandan and Vennila marry.

On the day of the marriage, to everybody's surprise, Manigandan is revealed to be an ex-convict and a crook. Vennila is shocked by this. It is now Manigandan's turn to overpower Vennila and he begins his game. The rest of the story follows with the fight between Manigandan and Vennila and how Manigandan surpasses Vennila's arrogance. In the end, it is revealed that the sister's lover is actually a crook who is already married and had illicitly socialised with her sister as he wanted to steal her property. In a fight ensuing, Manigandan pushes him and makes him disabled, Vennila asks for forgiveness to Manigandan & Co for her mistakes which they eventually accept. The film ends with Manigandan turning into Ayyappan devotee again.

== Cast ==
- Karthik as Manikandan aka Pistha Mani
- Nagma as Vennila
- Mouli as Dharmaraj
- Manivannan as Kesavan, Manikandan's friend
- Jayashree as Shanti
- Sindhu
- Balu Anand as Balu, Dharmaraj's servant
- Vasu Vikram as Ramakrishnan, Dharmaraj's ex-manager
- Mansoor Ali Khan as Adv. Adhimoolam
- Idichapuli Selvaraj
- Oru Viral Krishna Rao
- Kavignar Kalidasan as hotel owner
- Kumar Natarajan
- Bayilvan Ranganathan
- Crane Manohar as a house guest
- K. S. Ravikumar in a special appearance

== Soundtrack ==
The music was composed by S. A. Rajkumar and lyrics were penned by Kavignar Kalidasan.

Track listing
No.	Title	Singer(s)	Length
1.	"Pistha Pistha" (Instrumental)	–	0:45
2.	"Azhagu Puyala Ultra"	Harini	4:45
3.	"Kangalile Oru Kadhal Nila"	Mano, Sujatha	5:02
4.	"Oh Oh Kattuna Ponna"	Malaysia Vasudevan, Mano	4:47
5.	"Siru Siru Manithuli"	K. S. Chithra	1:08
6.	"Siru Siru" (sad)	K. S. Chithra	0:46
7.	"Kozhi Curry Konduvaratta"	Karthik	4:36
8.	"Saranam Ayyappa"	P. Unnikrishnan	5:00
Total length:			26:49

== Release and reception ==
Pistha was released on 9 May 1997. Kousi from Kalki wrote that if viewers discard all logic and fool themselves, they can laugh for two hours without questioning anything. The film became a major success, and Lalitha-Mani won the Tamil Nadu State Film Award for Best Dance Director.
