= Annai Vayal =

- Directed by: Ponvannan
- Written by: Ponvannan
- Produced by: Guruji
- Starring: Vignesh; Raj Murali; Vinodhini; Rayalsri
- Cinematography: K. V. Mani
- Edited by: K. Palanivel
- Music by: Sirpy
- Production company: Sri Rajarajeswari Film Corporation
- Release date: 25 September 1992
- Country: India
- Language: Tamil

Annai Vayal is a 1992 Indian Tamil-language drama film written and directed by Ponvannan in his directorial debut. The film stars Vignesh, Raj Murali, Vinodhini and Rayalsri. It was released on 25 September 1992 and failed at the box office.

== Cast ==
- Vignesh as Sathyam's brother
- Raj Murali as Sathyam
- Vinodhini
- Ponvannan as Chandran
- Rayalsri
- M. N. Nambiar
- Jayabharathi
- Senthil
- Nandagopal
- Janaki
- S. N. Lakshmi
- Pasi Sathya
- Kuzhandai Bhavani
- Meesai Vaathiyar
- Periya Karuppu Thevar
- Manikkaraj

== Production ==
Annai Vayal is the directorial debut of Ponvannan. Raj Murali, son of the producer Guruji, made his acting debut with this film. Vinodhini's voice was dubbed by Savitha Radhakrishnan.

== Soundtrack ==
The music was composed by Sirpy. Despite the film's lacklustre box office performance, Palani Bharathi, who wrote the lyrics of two songs, got more film offers.

Track listing
No.	Title	Lyrics	Singer(s)	Length
1.	"Nethu Naanga Naathankaalile"	Vayra	Mano	4:55
2.	"Malligai Poovazhagil"	Palani Bharathi	S. P. Balasubrahmanyam, S. Janaki	5:09
3.	"Poove Vanna Poove"	Arivumathi	Swarnalatha	4:45
4.	"Humming" (instrumental)	–	Minmini	1:14
5.	"Andhivaanathile Oru Aasaipura"	Palani Bharathi	S. Janaki	5:05
6.	"Maruthani Vecha Ponu Evathan"	Vayra	Malaysia Vasudevan, Mano	3:45
7.	"Raasave Kelu"	Vayra	Malaysia Vasudevan	2:24
8.	"Vaa Vaa Vennilave"	Arivumathi	S. P. Balasubrahmanyam, K. S. Chithra	5:06

== Release and reception ==
Annai Vayal was released on 25 September 1992. Malini Mannath of The Indian Express gave the film a positive review, primarily for Ponvannan's dialogues, the cinematography, editing and music. She also appreciated Vignesh and Vinodhini's performances, but felt Raj Murali "has to work more on his expressions". According to Ponvannan, the film did not come out the way he expected due to creative differences with the producer, hence the film failed at the box-office.
