= Palani Bharathi =

Indian poet and writer

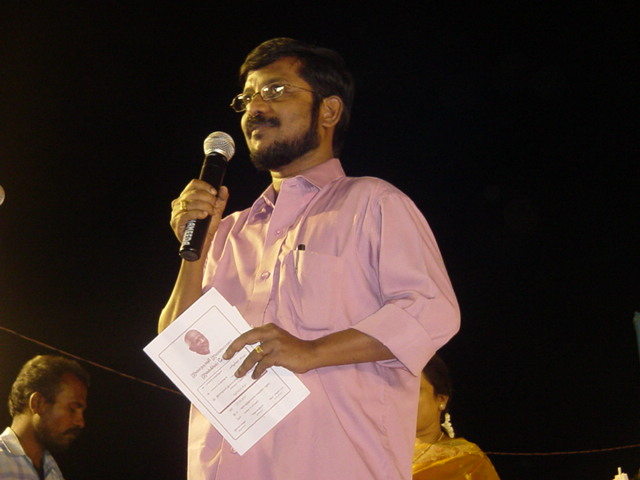
- Born: Karaikudi, Sivaganga, Tamil Nadu, India
- Occupations: Writer; lyricist; poet
- Spouse: Kalaivani
- Children: 1
- Writing career
- Years active: 1991–present

Palani Bharathi or Pazhani Bharathi (pronounced [paɭani baːɾaði] or [paɻani baːɾaði]) is an Indian writer and lyricist who works in Tamil cinema.

== Early life ==
Palani Bharathi was born in Karaikudi to Sami Palaniyappan, a poet, and Kamala. He has a brother and four sisters. Palaniyappan was an assistant of orator/writer Kundrakudi Adigal and follower of poet Bharathidasan. When Palaniyappan moved to Madras (now Chennai) with his family in search of work, he got a job in the government newspaper Tamil Arasu. As a result, Bharathi studied and grew in Chennai. He initially studied at a municipal school, and later at Ganapathy Higher Secondary School till the twelfth grade. Aspiring to become a film editor, he tried joining the M.G.R. Government Film and Television Training Institute, to no avail.

== Career ==
Bharathi began his career by editing articles, mainly correcting factual errors, in publications including Neerottam and Porval. He later got a job in the Tamil Nadu Textbook Corporation, of checking and recording the account of volumes of books transported in vehicles from the book warehouse, with his salary being ₹10 (equivalent to ₹94 or US$1.00 in 2026) per day. Bharathi was not very interested in that job, which did not last for more than a month. Unlike his father, Bharathi liked listening to filmi songs, and aspired to become a film lyricist. He was eventually introduced to director Vikraman, and wrote a song for the film Perum Pulli (1991) which did not appear onscreen. Bharathi later wrote some songs for Annai Vayal (1992); though the film was unsuccessful, the songs were well received and he received more offers. He achieved significant success writing all the songs for Ullathai Allitha (1996), and the 1995–1997 period is considered his "golden years", during which he wrote for over 100 films.

== Style ==
Bharathi prefers to write in simple, understandable language, taking inspiration from Kannadasan and Vaali. He explained, "Any literary piece is worth only if it reaches the audience and I keep it very simple. I don't believe in being verbose". He also said, "A song is no longer listened to for its meaning, it is mostly bought for the sake of rhythm and beat. Words go only to serve the musical purpose, not the semantic purpose". Palani Bharathi identifies himself as a "people's lyricist".

== Personal life ==
Bharathi is married to Kalaivani, and they have a child.

== Controversies ==
Bharathi wrote slanderous articles about Malathy Maitri, a founder of the feminist literary movement Anangu, and was eventually forced to write a public apology.

== Discography ==
=== Film ===
Year	Movie	Song(s)	Composer	Note
1991	Perum Pulli	"Ilamaiyin Vizhigalil"	S. A. Rajkumar	
1993	Naan Pesa Ninaipathellam	1. "Yalean Kiliyae"; 2. "Manoduthu Mayiloduthu"; 3. "Adi Pulla Alla Marathula"; 4. "Aagaya Gangaye"; 5. "Poonguyil Ragame"	Sirpy	
1993	Gokulam	1. "Chittada Rakkai"; 2. "Nane Madai Mela"; 3. "Puthu Roja Puthiruchu"; 4. "Antha Vanam"; 5. "Chevanthi Poo"; 6. "Chinna Chinna Assai"; 7. "Pon Malayil"; 8. "Therkke Adikkuthu"	Sirpy	
1994	Pavithra	"Eechambazham"	A. R. Rahman	
1994	Pudhiya Mannargal	1. "Eduda Antha Sooriya"; 2. "Vaanil Yeni"; 3. "Nee Kattum Selai"; 4. "Vaadi Saathukodi"	A. R. Rahman	
1995	Murai Maman	1. "Poove Poove"; 2. "Yennachi Yennachi"	Vidyasagar	
1995	Rangeela	"Rangeela Rangeela"	A. R. Rahman	
1996	Ullathai Allitha	1. "Adi Anarkali"; 2. "Azhagiya Laila"; 3. "Chittu Chittu Kuruvikku"; 4. "I Love You Love You"; 5. "Mama Nee Mama"	Sirpy	
1996	Poove Unakkaga	1. "Anantham Anantham"; 2. "Sollamalae"; 3. "Machinichi"	S. A. Rajkumar	
1996	Sengottai	1. "Uchchi Muthal Patham"	Vidyasagar	
1996	Mettukudi	1. "Anbulla Mannavane"; 2. "Velvetta Velvetta"; 3. "Indha Poonthendral"; 4. "Adi Yaaradhu Yaaradhu"; 5. "Mana Madurai Gundu Malliye"; 6. "Saravanabava"	Sirpy	
1997	Kaalamellam Kadhal Vaazhga	1. "Baghavanae"; 2. "Oru Mani Adithal"; 3. "Babilona"; 4. "Putham Pudhu Malargal"	Deva	
1997	Kathirunda Kadhal	1. "Alai Alai"; 2. "Dhavani Devathai"; 3. "Irin Scalila"; 4. "Kangalil Vanthaval"; 5. "Many Many"; 6. "Sir Uh Porandha"	Sirpy	
1997	Nesam	1. "O Ranganatha"; 2. "Madonna Varuvala"; 3. "Natchathira Bangla"; 4. "Thuli Thuli"	Deva	
1997	Mannava	"Pa Pa Chinnapappa"	Deva	
1997	Aravindhan	1. "All The Best"; 2. "Hey Ponnamma, Un Lovvu Yaaru Sollamma"; 3. "Pothum Idhu Pothum"; 4. "Eera Nila"	Yuvan Shankar Raja	
1997	Arunachalam	1. "Alli Alli Anarkili"; 2. "Mathadu Mathadu"	Deva	
1997	Raasi	1. "Yenadi Yenadi"; 2. "Ennai Thedatho"; 3. "Kadhalin Desam"; 4. "Poomalai"; 5. "Thendral"; 6. "Ennachu Thangachi"	Sirpy	
1997	Sishya	1. "Yaro Azhaithadhu"; 2. "Thigu Thigura"; 3. "O Lamba"	Deva	
1997	Ullaasam	1. "Konjum Manjal"; 2. "Veesum Kaatrukku"	Karthik Raja	
1997	Pasamulla Pandiyare	1. "Discovery Channel"; 2. "Oh Lovely"	Deva	
1997	Surya Vamsam	"Kadhala Kadhala"	S. A. Rajkumar	
1997	Once More	"Ooty Malai Beauty"	Deva	
1997	V. I. P.	"Netru No No Naalai No No"	Ranjit Barot	
1997	Kadhali	"Oh Nenje"	Deva	
1997	Kalyana Vaibhogam	"Vizhiyoda Adiye"	Deva	
1997	Janakiraman	1. "Hawaliya Hawaliya"; 2. "Hey Cha Cha Kadalicha"; 3. "Kadal Solla Varthai"; 4. "Pottu Mela Pottu"; 5. "Yenadi Kanne"	Sirpy	
1997	Periya Manushan	"Vaalapaari Chinna"	Deva	
1997	Poochudava	1. "Computer Graphic"; 2. "Kaadhal Kaadhal Kaadhal"; 3. "Nee Illai"; 4. "Sillu Sillu"; 5. "Vaaliba Vayasukku"	Sirpy	
1997	Kadhalukku Mariyadhai	1. "Ennai Thalaata"; 2. "Anantha Kuyilin Pattu"; 3. "Oru Pattam Poochi"; 4. "Idhu Sangeetha Thirunalo"; 5. "Anantha Kuyilin Pattu"; 6. "O Baby"; 7. "Ennai Thalatta Varuvala"; 8. "Ayya Veedu Therandhuthan"	Ilaiyaraaja	Won Best Lyricist
1997	Ottam (Tamil dubbed version)	1. "Ottam Than"; 2. "Sooriyanai"; 3. "Shabba Shabba"; 4. "En Kadhal Neruppe"; 5. "Oh! Vandhale"	A. R. Rahman	
1998	Moovendhar	1. "Chera Enna"; 2. "Nenja Thirandhu"; 3. "Singakutty"; 4. "Sokku Sundari"	Sirpy	
1998	Kaadhale Nimmadhi	1. "Gangai Nadhiye"; 2. "Indha Devathaikku"	Deva	
1998	Ninaithen Vandhai	1. "Vannanilavae Vannanilavae"; 2. "Ennavale Ennavale"; 3. "Maligayae Maligaiyae"; 4. "Un Marbile Vizhi Moodi"; 5. "Pottu Vaithu Poomudikkum"	Deva	
1998	Monalisa	1. "Enthan Uyir"; 2. "Veesum Thendral"; 3. "Eera Thamaraikku"; 4. "Ninaithale Inikkum"; 5. "Ajantha Oviyam"	A. R. Rahman	
1998	Aval Varuvala	1. "Sikki Mukki"; 2. "Idhu Kaadhalin"; 3. "Kaadhal Enna"; 4. "Ooh Vandhadhu"; 5. "Rukku Rukku"; 6. "Selaiyile Veedu"	S. A. Rajkumar	
1998	Priyamudan	1. "Pooja Vaa"; 2. "Mouriya"	Deva	
1998	Sandhippoma	1. "Naanthaan"; 2. "Andha Vennila"	Deva	
1998	Unnidathil Ennai Koduthen	"Thottabedda Kuliru"	S. A. Rajkumar	
1998	Desiya Geetham	1. "Ladies Special"; 2. "Naan Vaakkapattu"	Ilayaraaja	
1998	En Uyir Neethaane	1. "Mela Mela"; 2. "Pathinettu Vayasu"	Deva	
1999	Endrendrum Kadhal	1. "O Thendrale"; 2. "Kangala Minnala"	Manoj–Gyan	
1999	Nenjinile	"Prime Minister"	Deva	
1999	Poovellam Kettuppar	1. "CBI Enge"; 2. "Chudithar Aninthu"; 3. "Irava Pagala"; 4. "Poothathu"; 5. "Poove Poove"; 6. "Oh Senyoreeta"; 7. "Sevvaanam Vetkam Kondathu"	Yuvan Shankar Raja	
1999	Thodarum	"Shock Adikkum"	Ilaiyaraaja	
1999	Unnai Thedi	1. "Naalai Kalai"; 2. "Neethana"; 3. "Poraale"; 4. "Oyila Oyila"	Deva	
1999	Suyamvaram	1. "Margazhi Maasathu"; 2. "Sekka Sivanthavalea"	4 composers	
1999	Unakkaga Ellam Unakkaga	"Vennila Veliye"	Yuvan Shankar Raja	
1999	Thirupathi Ezhumalai Venkatesa	"Tirupathi Elumalai Venkatesa"	S. A. Rajkumar	
1999	Sethu	1. "Kadhalenna Kadhalenna"; 2. "Sikaadha Sitrondru"	Ilaiyaraaja	
2000	Kannukkul Nilavu	1. "Iravu Pagalai Theda"; 2. "Nilavu Paatu"; 3. "Oru Naal Oru Kanavu"; 4. "Adida Melathai"; 5. "Roja Poonthotam"; 6. "Enthen Kuilenge"; 7. "Chinnanchiru Kiliye"	Ilaiyaraaja	
2000	Rajakali Amman	"Santhana Malligaiyil"	S. A. Rajkumar	
2001	Friends	1. "Thendral Varum"; 2. "Kuyilikku Koo Koo"; 3. "Rukku Rukku"; 4. "Manjal Poosum Vaanam"; 5. "Penkaloda Potti"; 6. "Poonkatrae"; 7. "Vaanam Perusuthan"	Ilaiyaraaja	
2001	Rishi	1. "Vaa Vaa Poove Vaa"; 2. "Jumbo Idhu Kadhal"	Yuvan Shankar Raja	
2001	Thaalikaatha Kaaliamman	"Sun TV"	Sirpy	
2001	Badri	1. "Travelling Soldier"; 2. "Adi Jivunnu Jivunnu"; 3. "Salaam Maharasa"; 4. "Ennoda Laila"; 5. "Kalakalakudhu"; 6. "Kadhal Solvadhu"; 7. "Angel Vandhaaley"; 8. "King Of Chennai"; 9. "Stella Maris Laara"	Ramana Gogula	
2001	Star	"Adi Nenthikkitten"	A. R. Rahman	
2001	Nandhaa	"Mun Paniyaa"	Yuvan Shankar Raja	
2001	Kasi	"Punniyam Thedi Kasikku"	Ilaiyaraaja	
2002	Azhagi	1. "Damakku Damakku Dum"; 2. "Kuruvi Kodanja"	Ilaiyaraaja	
2002	Ramanaa	1. "Vaanaviley"; 2. "Vennilavin"; 3. "Oorukkoru"; 4. "Vaanaviley"; 5. "Angey Yaaru Paaru"	Ilaiyaraaja	
2002	Jaya	1. "Velli Kolusumani"	Bharani	
2003	Parasuram	1. "Chittukuruvi"; 2. "Jack And Jill"	A. R. Rahman	
2003	Jayam	1. "Kanamoochi"; 2. "Kodi Kodi Minnalgal"	R. P. Patnaik	
2003	Kaadhal Kondein	1. "Manasu Rendum"; 2. "Nenjodu"; 3. "Kadhal Mattum Purivathillai"	Yuvan Shankar Raja	
2003	Pithamagan	1. "Elangaathu Veesudhey"	Ilaiyaraaja	
2004	Udhaya	1. "Pookum Malarai"; 2. "Anjanam"	A. R. Rahman	
2004	Perazhagan	"Ambuli Mama"	Yuvan Shankar Raja	
2004	Kuthu	"Pachai Kili"	Srikanth Deva	
2004	Thendral	"Aazhakkadalu"	Vidyasagar	
2005	Maayavi	1. "Jo Jo Jothika"; 2. "Kadavul Thantha Azhakiya Vaalvu"	Devi Sri Prasad	
2005	Sachein	"Dai Dai Dai Kattikkoda"	Devi Sri Prasad	
2005	Chidambarathil Oru Appasamy	"Anaithu Vidungal"	Ilaiyaraaja	
2006	Vathiyar	"Kaiya Veesamma"	D. Imman	
2007	Naan Avanillai	"Then Kudicha"	Vijay Antony	
2009	Nesi	All songs	Sirpy	
2009	Vannathupoochi	"Katril Katril"	Rehan	
2014	Un Samayal Arayil	1. "Indha Porapudhan"; 2. "Eeramai Eeramai"; 3. "Therintho Theriyamalo"; 4. "Kaatru Veliyil"	Ilaiyaraaja	
2015	Dharani	1. "Malapola Unna Sumanthenae"; 2. "Yar Kobam"; 3. "Kanavae Kanavae"	Yensone Bakyanathan	
2016	Ilami	"Oh Ilami"	Srikanth Deva	
2022	Kantara (D)	1. "He Semmandha Azhage"; 2. "Aanamale Kaatukulla"; 3. "Manidhanin Payanathil"	B. Ajaneesh Loknath	
2024	Oru Anweshanathinte Thudakkam	"Aale Patha"	M. Jayachandran	Malayalam film with Tamil song

=== Television ===
Year	TV Series	Network	Song(s)	Music Director/ Composer(s)	Note
2001	Aanandha Bhavan	Sun TV	"Intha Vanathin Keezha Vazhum"	Yuvan Shankar Raja	
2001	Kavyanjali	Star Vijay	"Pasathil Irandu Paravai"	Aravind Siddhartha	
2003	Kolangal	Sun TV	"Kolangal Kolangal Azhagana Kolangal"	D. Imman	
2003	Kolangal	Sun TV	"Poovil Oru Idhalaga Piranthirunthal" "Kanbathenna Kanavo Kanimazhalai Ninaivo" "Kalyana Karunyaam Nithya" "Vazhi Meethu Vizhi Vaithu Kaathirukindren" "Kanavil Karuvai Sumakindrom" "Vanam Pole Valimaikkonda" "Singara Tamizhe"	Kiran	
2005	Malargal	Sun TV	"Arisi Mavale Kolam Podu"	Vijay Antony	
2007	Magal	Sun TV	"Aariraro Aariraro"	Rajhesh Vaidhya	
2008	Bhuvaneswari	Sun TV			
2012	Sondha Bandham	Sun TV	"Vanathil Vennilavu"	Bunty & Sunitha Sarathy	
2015	Kula Deivam	Sun TV	"Achuvellam Pacharasi Mavilakku"	Sanjeev Rathan	

== Notable works ==
- Neruppu Paarvaigal (collection of poems)
- Veli Nadappu
- Kadhalin Pin Kadhavu
- Mazhaippen
- Purakkal Maraintha Iravu
- Mutthangalin Pazhakkadai
- Thanimaiyil Vilayaadum Bommai
- Thanniril Vizhuntha Veyil
- Kaatrin Kaiyezhuththu

== Accolades ==
Year	Award	Category	Result	Note	Ref.
1997	Tamil Nadu State Film Award	Best Lyricist	Won	For Kadhalukku Mariyadhai	
1998	Kalaimamani	Film Personality	Won	The highest civilian award in the state of Tamil Nadu, India	
2021	Kaviko Award		Won		
