= Ahila India Naadalum Makkal Katchi =

- Leader: Karthik
- Founded: 2009

Ahila India Naadalum Makkal Katchi (Tamil: அகில இந்திய நாடாளும் மக்கள் கட்சி) is a Tamil political party in India, based amongst the Thevar caste. The party founder and president is actor Karthik. Karthik was the president of All India Forward Bloc and later left the party to start his own.

== 2011 Assembly elections ==
For the 2011 Assembly elections the party has joined the AIADMK alliance. Karthik announced his party will contest alone in 25 to 40 seats after it was not allotted any seat in the AIADMK coalition.
