= Pattaya Kelappu =

- Directed by: Ponnambalam
- Written by: Ponnambalam
- Produced by: Ponnambalam
- Starring: Sriman; Payal; Ponnambalam
- Cinematography: N. D. Vimalkanth; A. Vijayadevan
- Edited by: B. S. Vasu; Saleem
- Music by: E. L. Indhrajith
- Production company: Annai Vannamathi Films
- Release date: 15 January 2008
- Running time: 125 minutes
- Country: India
- Language: Tamil

Pattaya Kelappu (transl. Rock On) is a 2008 Tamil language action comedy film written, produced and directed by Ponnambalam, making his directorial debut. It stars Sriman, Payal and Ponnambalam, with Janagaraj, Dhamu, Pandu, Vasu Vikram, Kazan Khan and Crane Manohar playing supporting roles. The film began production in 2004 and was released in 2008.

== Plot ==
Ananthakrishnan (Sriman) is a jobless young graduate who is looking for work in the city. He comes across three good-for-nothings: Saamy (Dhamu), Nalan (Vasu Vikram) and Mano (Crane Manohar). The three friends have sympathy for him and decide to help him. Ananthakrishnan then moves in with them; the house is owned by the old man Arunachalam (Janagaraj), who accommodates them for free. Meanwhile, Dhanam (Payal), after finishing her studies in the city, returns to her native place. When she arrives at her village, her servant tells her that her uncle (Kazan Khan) killed her father (Vijay Krishnaraj) and is willing to marry her for stealing her property. A shocked Dhanam then returns to the city, and her friend Deepa (Minnal Deepa) hosts her.

One day, Arunachalam receives a demand draft of five lakhs of rupees on behalf of Anandakrishnan, and Ananthakrishnan then withdraws money from the bank. Thereafter, a rowdy named Anandakrishnan (Ponnambalam) says that the demand draft was his and asks for the money, but they confess that they have spent it all. In anger, Anandakrishnan threatens to kill them if they do not kill a man without a trace. Ananthakrishnan and his friends do not know what to do, and luckily, the man is found dead a few days later. Anandakrishnan congratulates them for the job done and offers them another mission: to catch Dhanam and bring her to him. Anandakrishnan will then bring her to her uncle. Dhanam is none other than Ananthakrishnan's lover.

Saamy, Nalan, and Mano then kidnap the innocent Dhanam with ease. When Anandakrishnan's henchmen carry Dhanam in their van, Ananthakrishnan, with a kerchief covering his face, stops their van and beats them up, thus saving Dhanam. Ananthakrishnan and Dhanam decide to get married in a hurry, but Anandakrishnan intercepts them, and Dhanam is forced to give up her property. Later, Dhanam's uncle tries to stop the marriage, but surprisingly, Anandakrishnan becomes a good person and decides to support the young lovers. During their fight, the police arrive on the scene and shoot Dhanam's uncle dead. Anandakrishnan then gives back the property to Dhanam and surrenders to the police. The film ends with Ananthakrishnan and Payal getting married.

== Cast ==
- Sriman as Ananthakrishnan
- Payal as Dhanam
- Ponnambalam as Anandakrishnan
- Janagaraj as Arunachalam
- Dhamu as Saamy
- Vasu Vikram as Nalan
- Crane Manohar as Mano
- Pandu as Thangam
- Kazan Khan as Dhanam's uncle
- Vijay Krishnaraj as Dhanam's father
- Minnal Deepa as Deepa
- Halwa Vasu as Arumugam
- Karate Raja
- Ganeshkar
- Besant Ravi as Police Inspector
- Scissor Manohar as Postman
- Saravana Sakthi as Waiter
- Sushmitha as Sarasu
- S. Lalitha as Mami
- Priyanka as Bhagya
- Sethu Vinayagam
- Sampath Ram
- Ravi Shanth
- Prem Pandi
- Paya Raja
- Daniel
- Ghilli Chandrasekhar

== Production ==
In 2004, Ponnambalam who had primarily appeared in supporting roles began working in Pattaya Kelappu produced by his home production Annai Vannamathi Films and said that his debut is targeted at the mass audiences in the urban and rural milieu. Sriman who acted as the hero in the Telugu action film Dharma (2004), signed to play the hero and hoped that the film will break the jinx.

== Soundtrack ==
The film score and the soundtrack were composed by E. L. Indhrajith. The soundtrack, released in 2004, features 5 tracks with lyrics written by Muthu Vijayan.

Song	Singer(s)	Duration
"Aakaya Megam"	Prasanna Rao	4:35
"Pathanpothu"	Malgudi Subha	4:43
"Rupa Rupa"	Prameela	4:38
"Thillalam Kidi"	Prasanna Rao, Padmalatha	4:09
"Vathalakundu"	Harini Sudhakar	4:24
