= Kings of Comedy Juniors =

- கிங்ஸ் ஆப் காமெடி ஜூனியர்ஸ்
- Genre: Comedy; Reality
- Presented by: Priyanka (Season:1-2)
- Judges: Robo Shankar
- Country of origin: India
- Original language: Tamil
- No. of seasons: 2
- No. of episodes: Season-01: 49; Season-02: 30

Production
- Production location: Tamil Nadu
- Camera setup: Multi-camera
- Running time: approx. 40-45 minutes per episode

Original release
- Network: Vijay TV
- Release: 8 April 2017 – 24 November 2018

Related
- Junior Super Star

Kings of Comedy Juniors (Tamil: கிங்ஸ் ஆப் காமெடி ஜூனியர்ஸ்) is a 2017 Indian Tamil-language children's stand-up comedy reality television show that airs on Vijay TV. The first season of the show began airing on 8 April 2017, and ended 17 September 2017 after airing 49 episodes. That aired every Saturday and Sunday on June 24, 2017, The judges are comedy actor Robo Shankar, actress Rambha and Sindhu.

The second season of the show aired from 28 July 2018 to 24 November 2018 every Saturday and Sunday. The judges are actors Robo Shankar and Vani Bhojan, and TV anchor Erode Mahesh.

== Seasons overview ==
| Season | Episodes | Originally aired | | Time |
| Season | Episodes | First aired | Last aired | Time |
|---|---|---|---|---|
| 1 | 49 | 8 April 2017 | 17 September 2017 | Saturday and Sunday; 19:00 (IST) |
| 2 | 30 | 28 July 2018 | 24 November 2018 | Saturday and Sunday; 19:00 (IST) |

== Season 1 ==
=== Winners ===
| Winners | Notes | Amount won |
|---|---|---|
| Sucil | Title Winners | cash prize |
| Uthra | Runner Up | cash prize |
| Athesh | Best Entertainer | cash prize |

Finalist

- Mukesh
- Mridhulasree
- Sucil
- Uthra
- Hrithikhasan
- Adhesh

== Cast ==
=== Host ===
- Priyanka

=== Judges ===
- Robo Shankar
- Rambha
- Sindhu

== Season 2 ==
=== Host ===
- Priyanka Deshpande

=== Judges ===
- Vani Bhojan
- Robo Shankar
- Erode Mahesh

=== Winners ===
| Winners | Notes | Amount won |
|---|---|---|
| Hema Priya | Title Winners | ₹ 2 Lakhs |
| Santhoshi | Runner Up | ₹ 1 Lakh |
| Keerthana | Best Entertainer | ₹ 1 Lakh |

Finalist

- Hemapriya
- Santhoshi
- Monish
- Tharun
- Vishwa
- Keerthana
