= Kazan Khan =

Indian film actor (1972-2023)

- Born: 22 July 1972; Bangalore, India
- Died: 12 June 2023 (aged 50)
- Occupation: Actor
- Years active: 1992–2015

Kazan Khan (22 June 1972 – 12 June 2023) was an Indian actor who predominantly appeared in Tamil, Malayalam, Kannada and Telugu films. He was best known for his villain roles.

== Career ==
Kazan made his acting debut in the year 1992 with Tamil film Senthamizh Paattu at age 20. He gained widespread acclaim for his portrayal of negative roles in Tamil cinema, including notable performances in films like Kalaignan, Sethupathi IPS, Duet, Murai Maman, Aanazhagan, and Karuppu Nila, to name a few. He made his Malayalam film debut with 1993 film Gandharvam alongside Mohanlal. He is known for his roles in films Mettukudi, Vanathai Pola, Vallarasu, The King, Varnapakittu, CID Moosa, Christian Brothers, Sevenes, Mayamohini, Rajathiraja, Maryada Ramanna, and Laila O Laila. Khan died from a heart attack on 12 June 2023, aged 50.

== Filmography ==
Year	Film	Role	Language	Notes
1992	Senthamizh Paattu	Boopathy	Tamil	
1992	Kalaignan	Anwar	Tamil	
1993	Vedan	Madhan	Tamil	
1993	Gandharvam	Rajkumar	Malayalam	
1994	Sethupathi IPS	Sivaprakash/Shantharam	Tamil	
1994	En Aasai Machan	Meenakshi's uncle	Tamil	
1994	Sindhu Nathi Poo	Kodumudi	Tamil	
1994	Duet		Tamil	
1995	Murai Maman	Ratnam	Tamil	
1995	Veluchami	Raja	Tamil	
1995	Kattumarakaran	Johnny	Tamil	
1995	Gandhi Pirantha Mann	Doctor	Tamil	
1995	Karuppu Nila	Vasu	Tamil	
1995	Aanazhagan		Tamil	
1995	Mr. Vasu	Aravind	Kannada	
1995	The King	Vikram Paramanand Ghorpade	Malayalam	
1996	Ullathai Allitha	Shankar	Tamil	
1996	Thayagam	Sunil	Tamil	
1996	Musthaffaa	Rajaram	Tamil	
1996	Pudhu Nilavu		Tamil	
1996	Krishna		Tamil	
1996	Mettukudi	Deivathinam's son	Tamil	
1996	Minugu Thare		Kannada	
1997	Cheluva	Kodanda	Kannada	
1997	Mappillai Gounder		Tamil	
1997	Varnapakittu	Mohammed Ali	Malayalam	
1997	Devudu	Sarweswara Rao's brother-in-law	Telugu	
1998	Naam Iruvar Namakku Iruvar		Tamil	
1998	Color Kanavugal		Tamil	
1998	Rathna		Tamil	
1998	Dharma	Amarnath	Tamil	
1999	Ponnu Veetukkaran	Giridaran	Tamil	
1999	Habba	Seetha's brother	Kannada	
1999	Maravathe Kanmaniye		Tamil	
2000	Vaanathaippola	Subramani	Tamil	
2000	Yajamana	Keerthi's cousin	Kannada	
2000	Vallarasu	Terrorist	Tamil	
2000	Nagadevathe	Kama Naga	Kannada	
2000	Priyamaanavale	7 Times (Priya's uncle)	Tamil	
2000	Kannan Varuvaan		Tamil	
2000	Dreams		Malayalam	
2000	The Gang	Ajay	Malayalam	
2001	Vande Matharam	Inspector Deva	Kannada	
2001	Asura	Jayaraj	Kannada	
2001	Railway Coolie		Telugu	
2001	Eduruleni Manishi		Telugu	
2001	Badri	Rohith's coach	Tamil	
2001	Chinna	Appa Rao's son	Telugu	
2001	Narasimha	Chinna Thamburan Iranyan	Tamil	
2001	Adhipathi		Telugu	
2001	Grama Devathe		Kannada	
2001	Bhadrachalam	Suraj	Telugu	
2002	Game		Tamil	
2003	Raja Narasimha	Prakash	Kannada	
2003	Palnati Brahmanayudu		Telugu	
2003	CID Moosa	Terrorist	Malayalam	
2004	Veera Kannadiga		Kannada	
2004	Adhu		Tamil	
2005	786 Khaidi Premakatha		Telugu	
2005	Alaiyadikkuthu		Tamil	
2005	Varsha	Lakshman's son	Kannada	
2005	Kaatrullavarai	Mahesh	Tamil	
2005	Nammanna		Kannada	
2006	The Don	Sharon Bhai	Malayalam	
2006	Pandavaru		Kannada	
2006	Tenali Rama		Kannada	
2007	Soundarya	Johny	Kannada	
2007	Snehana Preethina	Police Inspector	Kannada	
2007	Cheena Thaana 001	Gulshan Baba	Tamil	
2008	Pattaya Kelappu	Dhanam's uncle	Tamil	
2011	Christian Brothers	Khan Bhai	Malayalam	
2011	Dandam Dashagunam		Kannada	
2011	Sevenes	Sudhakara Moorthy	Malayalam	
2012	Masters	Yacob	Malayalam	
2012	Mayamohini	Sanjay	Malayalam	
2014	Kovalanin Kadhali		Tamil	
2014	RajadhiRaja	Gangster Khalid	Malayalam	
2015	Ivan Maryadaraman	Mahesh Sharma	Malayalam	
2015	Lailaa O Lailaa	Dhara	Malayalam	
