= U. K. Senthil Kumar =

Indian cinematographer (born 1972)

- Born: 1972; Coimbatore, Tamil Nadu, India
- Occupations: Cinematographer, Film Producer

U. K. Senthil Kumar is an Indian cinematographer, who has worked in the Tamil and Malayalam film industries.

== Career ==
A native of Coimbatore, Senthil Kumar belongs to the 1989-92 batch of the Government Film Institute, Chennai, and has worked in about 50 films. After making his debut in 1993 with Manobala's Karuppu Vellai (1993), Senthil Kumar worked exclusively for director Sundar C in the late 1990s and early 2000s, before being displaced in Sundar's teams by Prasad Murella. He continued working in quickly shot, low budget films and established a reputation as a talented cameraman. He also acted in Kusthi film in 2006. He then returned to work with Sundar C in the well received comedy films Kalakalappu (2012) and then Aranmanai (2014). He has also helped politicians with their promotion campaigns, helping create hologram-like videos for Narendra Modi's 2014 campaign and was established as nations one of the best camera man. He also worked for Telangana chief minister Chandrasekar Rao for his elections. Other than these work he also waved his flag in Tamil serials. Nandini is a supernatural television show which was also a successful work in his career.

== Selected filmography ==
=== As cinematographer ===
- Karuppu Vellai (1993)
- Amaithipadai (1994) (Camera Operator Only)
- Murai Maman (1995)
- Murai Mappillai (1995)
- Ullathai Allitha (1996)
- Mettukudi (1996)
- Arunachalam (1997)
- Janakiraman (1997)
- Naam Iruvar Namakku Iruvar (1998)
- Unnai Thedi (1999)
- Suyamvaram (1999)
- Unakkaga Ellam Unakkaga (1999)
- Azhagarsamy (2000)
- Kannan Varuvaan (2000)
- Unnai Kann Theduthey (2000)
- Ullam Kollai Poguthae (2001)
- Rishi (2001)
- Maaran (2002)
- Indru (2003)
- Jore (2004)
- Kodambakkam (2006)
- Nenjil Jil Jil (2006)
- Manikanda (2007)
- Naan Avanillai (2007)
- Marudhamalai (2007)
- Pandi (2008)
- Guru En Aalu (2009)
- Kanyakumari Express (2010)
- Muthukku Muthaaga (2011)
- Uppukandam Brothers Back in Action (2011)
- Pandi Oliperukki Nilayam (2012)
- Ullam (2012)
- Vizha (2013)
- Aranmanai (2014)
- Vilasam (2014)
- Sakalakala Vallavan (2015)
- Katham Katham (2015)
- Angali Pangali (2015)
- Pallikoodam Pogamale (2015)
- Aranmanai 2 (2016)
- Muthuramalingam (2017)
- Meesaya Murukku (2017)
- Kalakalappu 2 (2018)
- Nenjamundu Nermaiyundu Odu Raja (2019)
- Aranmanai 3 (2021)
- My Dear Bootham (2022)
- Lucky The Superstar (2026)

=== As Producer ===
- Amaidhipadai (1994)
