= Railway Coolie =

Indian action crime film

- Directed by: Kodi Ramakrishna
- Written by: M. G. Rama Rao (dialogues)
- Produced by: D. Sudhakar Raju; Edida Raja
- Starring: Mammootty; Meena; Harish Kumar; Roja
- Cinematography: Kodi Lakshman
- Music by: Sirpy
- Production company: Sri Lakshmi Sai Art Creations
- Release date: 30 March 2001
- Country: India
- Language: Telugu

Railway Coolie is a 2001 Indian Telugu-language action crime film directed by Kodi Ramakrishna and starring Mammootty, Meena, Harish Kumar and Roja. The film is a remake of the 1975 Hindi film Deewaar.

== Cast ==
- Mammootty as Prabhu
- Meena
- Harish Kumar
- Roja as Lakshmi
- Srividya
- Y. Vijaya
- Kazan Khan
- Beeda Masthan Rao
- Costumes Krishna

== Production ==
The third schedule of the film took place at the end of April 1993 in Visakhapatnam.

== Soundtrack ==
The music was composed by Sirpy. The lyrics were written by Sirivennela Seetharama Sastry and Jonnavittula Ramalingeswara Rao.

Tamil (dubbed) tracklisting

All lyrics are written by Kalidasan.

No.	Title	Singer(s)	Length
1.	"Enge En Pondadi"	G. Venugopal	4:27
2.	"Jigu Jigu Railu"	Mano	4:55
3.	"Kala Kala"	Krishnaraj	4:05
Total length:			13:27

== Release and reception ==
The film was released after an eight year delay in 2001.

A critic from Full Hyderabad wrote, "The stupid drama rolls on and on in the most insipid way. There is not one incident or event in the film that is worth mentioning".
