= Suyamvaram =

1999 Indian comedy drama film

- Theatrical release poster
- Directed by: 14 directors
- Screenplay by: Siraj
- Story by: Giridharilal Nagpal
- Produced by: Giridharilal Nagpal
- Cinematography: 17 cinematographers
- Edited by: 4 editors
- Music by: 4 composers
- Production company: L. S. Movies
- Release date: 16 July 1999
- Running time: 155 minutes
- Country: India
- Language: Tamil

Suyamvaram (transl. Betrothal ceremony) is a 1999 Indian Tamil-language comedy drama film produced and co-written by Giridharilal Nagpal. The film is notable for its unique production process, in which 14 directors, 19 cinematographers, and over 30 prominent actors collaborated. Conceptualized by Nagpal, the film features an ensemble cast and was shot in a single day. Nagpal, who also wrote the story, brought together a diverse group of talent from the Tamil film industry for the project.

== Plot ==
Kuselan (Vijayakumar) and his wife Suseela (Manjula Vijayakumar) head a large family consisting of their three sons — Arunachalam (Sathyaraj), Aavudaiyappan (Prabhu), and Indiran (Abbas) – and six daughters – Urvashi (Rambha), Easwari (Roja), Uma (Kasthuri), Aishwarya (Maheswari), Hema (Preetha Vijayakumar), and Ezhilarasi (Suvalakshmi). Azhagappan (Parthiban) is the family's loyal servant, and Krishna (Napoleon) is their family doctor.

The film begins with Kuselan suffering a heart attack during his 60th birthday celebrations. At the hospital, the family is informed that Kuselan's condition is critical, and he is expected to live only a short while. In his final days, Kuselan requests one last favour: that all his children be married before his death. The children agree, and an advertisement is placed offering family property and ₹1 crore in cash to anyone who marries one of Kuselan's children. The announcement attracts numerous potential brides and grooms, who are interviewed by Gnanapithan (K. Bhagyaraj) and Arivolimangai (Urvashi), or by doctors Mithrabuthan (Janagaraj) and Panchabootham (Senthil).

Kuselan, Suseela, and Krishna are happy upon thinking that everything would happen as planned, but there is a major hitch that they did not know about: most of the children have already fallen in love. Arunachalam, Aavudaiappan, and Indiran have romantic relationships with Khushbu, Savithri (Ishwarya), and Heera, respectively. Easwari, Uma, Aishwarya, and Hema are in love with Kanna (Prabhu Deva), Pallavan (Pandiarajan), Gautham (Vineeth), and Kanthen (Livingston), respectively. With some effort and bribery, the lovers manage to be selected for the marriage interviews. Urvashi is paired with the absent-minded Dr. Ram Kumar (Karthik), who mistakenly believes the interview is for a medical position. Ezhilarasi is matched with Azhagappan.

The plot takes a twist when Kabilan (Mansoor Ali Khan), with his accomplice Vichitra (Vichithra), attempts to pose as a groom but fails. In retaliation, he kidnaps the nine brides for ransom. Kuselan's friend, ACP Sanjay IPS (Arjun Sarja), is called to handle the situation. Sanjay defeats Kabilan and his gang, defuses a bomb planted by Kabilan at the wedding hall, and rescues the brides.

In the final revelation, Kuselan confesses that his heart attack was a ruse, and his true intention was to ensure that his children got married without delay.

== Cast ==
In order of appearance:

- Vijayakumar as Kuselan, the patriarch of the family
- Manjula Vijayakumar as Suseela, Kuselan's supportive wife

Sons:

- Sathyaraj as Arunachalam, the eldest son.
- Prabhu as Aavudaiyappan, the middle son.
- Abbas as Indiran, the youngest son. (Voice dubbed by Sekar P. R.)

Daughters:

- Roja as Easwary, the eldest daughter. (Voice dubbed by Jayageetha)
- Kasthuri as Uma, the second daughter.
- Rambha as Urvasi, the third daughter. (Voice dubbed by KR Anuradha)
- Maheswari as Aiswarya, the fourth daughter. (Voice dubbed by KR Anuradha)
- Preetha Vijayakumar as Hema, the fifth daughter. (Voice dubbed by Jayageetha)
- Suvaluxmi as Ezhilarasi, the youngest daughter. (Voice dubbed by Nithya Ravindar)

Love interests and spouses:

- Khushbu as a tribal woman and Arunachalam's love interest turned wife. (Voice dubbed by KR Anuradha)
- Aishwariyaa as Savithri, a Telugu-speaking cleaner and Aavudaiyappan's wife.
- Heera as Maheswari, a modern woman and Indiran's love interest turned wife. (Voice dubbed by Priya)
- Prabhu Deva as Kanna, a movie ticket seller and Easwary's love interest turned husband.
- Pandiarajan as Pallavan. Uma's love interest turned husband.
- Karthik as Dr. Ram Kumar, an absent-minded doctor and Urvasi's love interest turned husband.
- Vineeth as Gautham. Aiswarya's love interest turned husband. (Voice dubbed by Ravishankar Devanarayanan)
- Livingston as Kanthan. Hema's love interest turned husband.
- Parthiban as Azhagappan, Kuselan and Suseela's house servant and Ezhilarasi's husband.

Supporting roles:

- Napoleon as Dr. Krishna. Kuselan and Suseela's family doctor.
- Arjun as ACP Sanjay IPS.
- K. Bhagyaraj as Gnanapithan, who interviews potential grooms alongside Arivolimangai.
- Urvashi as Arivolimangai, who interviews potential brides alongside Gnanapithan.
- Janagaraj as Mitrabuthan.
- Senthil as Panchabootham.
- Mansoor Ali Khan as Kabilan, a gangster posing as a groom to plant a bomb at the wedding hall.
- Vignesh as Ezhilarasi's prospective groom (Voice dubbed by Sekar P. R.)
- Vichitra as Vichitra
- Alphonsa as a dancer
- Cochin Haneefa as Paandi
- S. S. Chandran as Savithri's father
- Kavitha as Savithri's mother
- Balu Anand as Kanna's father
- K. R. Vatsala as Kanna's mother
- Shanthi Williams as Pallavan's mother
- Lavanya as Pallavan's sister
- Kavithalayaa Krishnan as the auto driver
- Dhamu as a patient
- Kumarimuthu as the compounder
- Madhan Bob as the priest
- Vaiyapuri as potential groom
- Halwa Vasu as potential groom
- Scissor Manohar as potential groom
- Anu Mohan as Sanjay's assistant
- Crane Manohar Paandi's friend
- Pandu as Arunachalam's friend
- Muthukaalai as Arunachalam's friend
- Vichu Vishwanath as Aavudaiyappan's friend
- Sathyapriya as Kannikkadevi
- Mohan Sharma as Sundaram
- Bonda Mani as hosteller
- Nellai Siva as hosteller
- Mohan Raman
- Ravikanth as wedding guest
- Periya Karuppu Thevar as wedding guest
- Vellai Subbaiah as wedding guest
- Ambika as wedding guest

== Crew ==
- Directors: J. Paneer, A. R. Ramesh, Keyaar, E. Ramdoss, Arjun, Guru Dhanapal, Liaquat Ali Khan, R. Sundarrajan, Selvaa, K. Subash, Sundar C, Siraj, K. S. Ravikumar, P. Vasu
- Screenplay & dialogues: Siraj
- Story & producer: Giridharilal Nagpal
- Music Composers: Deva, S. A. Rajkumar, Sirpy, Vidyasagar
- Cinematographers: Babu, Raghunatha Reddy, B. L. Rao, D. Shankar, K. S. Selvaraj, A. Karthik Raja, Ashokrajan, K. S. Udhayashankar, C Vijayasri, M. V. Panneerselvam, U. K. Senthil Kumar, R. B. Imayavaramban, Ram Gunasekharan, R. Rajarathnam, R. H. Ashok, K. B. Ahmed, G. Mohan, Victor S. Kumar
- Editors: P. Sai Suresh, K. Thanikachalam, P. Madan Mohan, L. Kesavan
- Art Director: GK

== Production ==
Producer Giridharilal Nagpal announced his intentions of making Suyamvaram, a film shot within 24 hours, in January 1999, stating it had been a fourteen-year dream. The film's launch event was held in the same month on 24 January 1999, with prominent actors Rajinikanth and Kamal Haasan attending. Initially, the filmmakers intended to complete the entire production in 24 hours on 24 March 1999. However, delays occurred, leading to significant changes in the cast and crew. As a result, actors Vijayakanth, Murali, Prashanth, and Prakash Raj, who had initially committed to the project, had to opt out. Additionally, actresses Simran, Devayani and Keerthi Reddy, along with directors R. K. Selvamani and S. A. Chandrasekhar, were no longer part of the film. Siraj, one of the directors, wrote the screenplay and dialogues for the film.

Despite the delays, Nagpal remained determined to complete the film within 24 hours. He scheduled the filming for 5 and 6 April 1999 across multiple studios in Chennai, bringing together a massive crew. The production involved 19 associate directors, 45 assistant directors, 19 cameramen, 36 assistant cameramen, nine steadicam operators, 14 lead actors, 12 lead actresses, villains, comedians, five dance masters, 16 assistants, 140 chorus dancers, stunt coordinators, and a large team of technicians, including makeup artists, costume designers, set designers, and a still photographer. In total, 1,483 extras were involved.

The filmmakers were under constant pressure to complete the film in the allotted time. Despite months of preparation, many details were left to the last minute, and no script was available. Directors provided scenes to actors, who would rehearse briefly before filming. Two representatives from the Guinness World Records were present to oversee the time-schedule, accompanied by officials from the Limca Book of Records.

Nagpal outlined his ambitious plan: the entire filmmaking process—including shooting, developing rushes, editing, dubbing, re-recording, and final mixing—was to be completed within 24 hours. The script was divided into 11 parts, with each director responsible for filming one part, and all directors worked simultaneously across different sets and venues.

Filming commenced at 7:00 AM on 5 April at AVM Studios' sixth floor and AVM Gardens, directed by Sundar C. At 9.30 AM scenes were shot at the Kamaraj Memorial with Prabhu Deva and Roja, followed by scenes at 11:00 AM involving Sathyaraj and Khushbu in a gypsy tent camp set. At noon, a song sequence featuring Abbas and Heera was filmed at Film City, and scenes with Pandiarajan and Kasthuri were shot by Ramdoss at Guindy. Filming continued throughout the day and into the night, with P. Vasu filming scenes with Prabhu and Aishwarya at 2:45 PM. Karin Przygocki, an English teacher at the American International School Chennai, was recruited to play an American who marries into a traditional Indian family but her role was later changed to that of a jilted lover in Prabhu's office.

A dance sequence at a discothèque in Abu Palace was filmed at 5:30 PM, featuring Vineeth and Maheswari. By 6:30 PM, the entire crew gathered at the Vijaya Vauhini Studios, which had been transformed to resemble a wedding hall, for the final scenes. However, by 3:00 AM on 6 April, the production had fallen two hours behind schedule. In response, four directors improvised and revised the storyline, merging two scenes into one to save time. At the same time, Vineeth refused to shoot a scene in which his character was locked in a bathroom, causing additional delays as the directors attempted to convince him to continue. Despite these challenges, the team completed the filming of the kidnap scenes at Kushaldoss House by 6:25 AM. The final shot was completed at 6:50 AM, with just ten minutes left before the 24-hour deadline.

Director Sundar C, who shot the opening scene of the film, noted that all the directors had several planning sessions to ensure smooth transitions between scenes, while P. Vasu emphasised constant coordination to ensure continuity. Actor-director Arjun, who appeared as a cop in the film, also co-ordinated the action scenes in the climax. Costume designer S. V. Kumar worked with forty assistants, and dance choreographer Lalita Mani contributed to the film's musical sequences. Art director G. K. oversaw the set designs across 21 locations, managing the operations via mobile communication. Giridharilal's son Vinay played a key role in ensuring the smooth progression of the project across locations.

== Soundtrack ==
The soundtrack consists of five songs composed by four composers.The Prabhu Deva–Roja dance for the song “Siva Siva Sankara” (composed by Vidyasagar, with lyrics by Ilakkiyan and sung for the first time by Prabhu Deva) is one of the highlights of the film.

Tamil

Song title	Lyrics	Composer	Singers
"Kaanakozhikku"	Ponniyin Selvan	Deva	Anuradha Sriram, Sabesan
"Kathirunthaalea Rajakumari"	Mu. Metha	S. A. Rajkumar	Sujatha Mohan
"Margazhi Maasathu"	Palani Bharathi	S. A. Rajkumar	S. P. Balasubrahmanyam, Mano, Unnikrishnan, Swarnalatha, Sujatha Mohan
"Sekka Sivanthavalea"	Palani Bharathi	Sirpy	Hariharan, Sujatha Mohan
"Siva Siva Siva Shankara"	Ilakkiyan	Vidyasagar	Prabhu Deva

Telugu

The film was dubbed in Telugu as Pellante Idera. All the songs in the film were written by Vennelakanti.

Song title	Lyrics	Composer	Singers
"Magha Maasam"	Vennelakanti	S. A. Rajkumar	Mano, S.P. Sailaja, Sujatha Mohan, Parthasarathy
"Siva Siva Sankara"	Vennelakanti	Vidyasagar	Mano
"Nacchina Chinnadaana"	Vennelakanti	Sirpy	Unni Krishnan, Sujatha Mohan
"Eduru Choose Rajakumari"	Vennelakanti	S. A. Rajkumar	Sujatha Mohan
"Pellante Noorella Panta"	Vennelakanti	Deva	S. P. Balasubrahmanyam, K. S. Chitra, S.P. Sailaja

== Release and reception ==
The film was released on 16 July 1999. K. N. Vijiyan of New Straits Times wrote, "The cast seems to have enjoyed themselves tremendously doing this movie. So will you, too". Shobha Warrier of Rediff.com claimed the attempt "particularly praiseworthy if we take into consideration the time factor and the amount of co-ordination the film-makers had to do", whilst adding that the film was "slicker and better made than many churned out regularly by some film factories". A critic from Sify noted, "it can be seen for its record achievement feat but entertainment it does not offer." K. P. S. of Kalki praised the directors for covering every portion into a full-length film and every scene seemed like watching a new film. D. S. Ramanujam of The Hindu wrote the film is "not only a fairly humorous entertainer but an example of how the artistes and technicians of Tamil filmdom can co-operate wholeheartedly, put their heart and soul, complete a movie in just 24 hours and earn a place in the Guinness Book of Records". However Kala Krishnan Ramesh of Deccan Herald gave a negative review noting "Swayamvaram is disappointing largely because there is enough in the existing story and its events to have made a much better film. A few more competent dialogues, a slightly more imaginative screenplay, and you would`ve had an enjoyable entertainer".

== Other versions ==
The film was dubbed into Telugu as Pellante Idera! by P. R. Kutumba Rao and released in October 2001. Kutumba Rao was persuaded to release the film in Telugu by Narasimha Rao of the Raasi Movies studio, while Vennelakanti worked on the Telugu dialogues and music was rearranged by G. Anand. The makers of the Telugu version opted to select a different voice artist for each character, rather than save costs by using individuals who can provide multiple voices.

A Hindi remake of the film was pondered by the producer, but later shelved.

Inspired by the film, the producers later announced their next project, which would feature five actors and actresses, to be shot within ten days, but the project did not proceed.
