= Arunachalam (film) =

1997 film by Sundar C

- Theatrical release poster
- Directed by: Sundar C
- Written by: Sundar C
- Dialogue by: Crazy Mohan
- Based on: Brewster's Millions by George Barr McCutcheon
- Produced by: K. S. Nagarajan Raja; K. Muraliprasad Rao
- Starring: Rajinikanth; Soundarya; Rambha
- Cinematography: U. K. Senthil Kumar
- Edited by: P. Sai Suresh
- Music by: Deva
- Production company: Annamalai Cine Combines
- Release date: 10 April 1997
- Running time: 165 minutes
- Country: India
- Language: Tamil

Arunachalam is a 1997 Indian Tamil-language masala film directed by Sundar C and written by Crazy Mohan. The film stars Rajinikanth as the title character as well as in a dual role, alongside Soundarya and Rambha, with Jaishankar, Ravichandran and Visu in supporting roles. It revolves around a village simpleton, who later discovers he is the heir of a deceased billionaire, but must face extreme challenges to claim his father's inheritance.

The film is loosely based on the 1902 George Barr McCutcheon novel Brewster's Millions. But it is heavily inspired by the movie under the same name (Brewster’s Millions) released in 1985.

The soundtrack and background score were composed by Deva, while U. K. Senthil Kumar handled the cinematography and P. Sai Suresh did so for editing.

Arunachalam was released on 10 April 1997 and became a box office success. It won three Tamil Nadu State Film Awards, including Best Film.

== Plot ==
In Alanganallur, Arunachalam, a respected young village headman, resides with his parents, Ammayappan and Janaki, three younger siblings, Saravanan, Sakthivel, and sister Arundhati. Their grandmother, Vedhavalli, is a stern matriarch, who takes pride in their ancestral lineage. As Arundhati's wedding approaches, Ammayappan's estranged sister, Umayal, returns with her family. Vedhavalli had disowned Umayal for marrying Aathikesavan against her wishes. Umayal's teenage daughter, Vedhavalli, named after her grandmother, is impressed by Arunachalam's reputation among the villagers. Umayal and Aathikesavan contemplate reunifying with their family by arranging Vedhavalli's marriage to one of her cousins. At Arundhati's wedding, Chokkalingam attempts to halt the ceremony, forcing Arundhati to marry his son Ponnambalam, citing a document signed by Ammayappan, but Arunachalam confronts them, ensuring Arundhati's wedding proceeds as planned.

Following a few encounters, Vedhavalli falls in love with Arunachalam. However, Vedhavalli (the grandmother) refuses to allow Arunachalam to marry her granddaughter. At the panchayat, Sakthivel is accused of deceiving a poor girl and being intimate with her. Sakthivel denies the allegations and refuses to marry her, citing the girl's impoverished background. Arunachalam, who has witnessed Sakthivel's closeness to the girl, proposes to relinquish his share of the family property to the girl, to make Sakthivel accept her. But, Arunachalam's grandmother intervenes, revealing a long-hidden secret: Arunachalam is an orphan, adopted by Ammayappan and Janaki, who were childless. It is revealed that Meenakshiyammal, Arunachalam's biological mother, handed over her newborn son to Ammayappan on her deathbed. Upon learning the truth, Arunachalam leaves the village and travels to Madras.

In Madras, Arunachalam meets Beeda Kathavarayan, who offers him a job and soon befriends Nandhini, the daughter of an honest businessman Rangachari. Rangachari and four other businessmen manage the vast properties of the late billionaire Vedhachalam, worth ₹3,030 crore (equivalent to ₹170 billion or US$1.8 billion in 2026). Unknown to Arunachalam, Vedhachalam is his biological father. Arunachalam stumbles upon a meeting where the ₹3030 crore properties will be transferred to the fraudulent businessmen Vishwanath, Kaliyaperumal, Prathap, and Kurian. Rangachari recognizes Arunachalam as Vedhachalam's son, the rightful heir to the properties. Through a video left by his deceased father, Arunachalam learns that to inherit the ₹3000 crores, he must adhere to the condition of spending ₹30 crore (equivalent to ₹167 crore or US$18 million in 2026) within 30 days, along with certain conditions like, not providing donations; not holding ownership over assets at the end of 30 days; utmost secrecy, with receipts required for all expenses. If Arunachalam fails to meet these conditions, the properties will be transferred to the businessmen. Arunachalam declines, suggesting the properties be used for the people's benefit, as per his father's wishes.

Arunachalam leaves, but a monkey steals his rudraksha, which he reclaims atop a tree; from there, he overhears the four corrupt businessmen's plans to embezzle the wealth, and accepts the challenge. To spend that ₹30 crores, Arunachalam embarks on a lavish spending spree. He rents a five-star hotel, and cars, participates in horse racing, buys lottery tickets, and invests in film production, casting his friend Arivazhagan as the lead actor. However, the four corrupt businessmen attempt to thwart Arunachalam's plans by spending their own money to hinder his progress. Arunachalam launches his political party, with Kathavarayan as the MP candidate. However, just before the 30-day deadline expires, Arunachalam dissolves the party and has Kathavarayan resign from his post. Also, Arunachalam's relationship with Vedhavalli becomes strained as he cannot lend her money due to the conditions and also being unable to disclose the reason to her. Vedhavalli assumes Arunachalam has changed and accepts a marriage proposal from Aathikesavan's friend's son, who offers to clear Aathikesavan's debt.

After completing the spending challenge, Arunachalam heads to Rangachari's office to sign the documents. However, the corrupt businessmen thwart Arunachalam's efforts by ensuring he receives ₹20,000 (equivalent to ₹110,000 or US$1,200 in 2026) at the last minute. Arunachalam uses ₹20,000 to pay Nandhini's salary, thereby fulfilling the conditions and inheriting his father's ₹3030 crore crore property. He entrusts Rangachari with managing the wealth to benefit the public. Enraged by their failure to usurp the wealth, they attack Arunachalam and Rangachari. Arunachalam defeats them and, in a final press conference, Rangachari reveals Arunachalam's mission to inherit the wealth for the greater good. Moved by Arunachalam's selflessness, the older Vedhavalli accepts him as her grandson and heir. The younger Vedhavalli also understands his true nature, and they eventually marry.

== Cast ==
- Rajinikanth in a dual role as
  - Arunachalam
  - Vedhachalam
- Soundarya as Vedhavalli Aathikesavan
- Rambha as Nandhini Rangachari
- Jaishankar as Aathikesavan
- Ravichandran as Ammayappan
- Raghuvaran as Vishwanath
- Visu as Rangachari
- V. K. Ramasamy as Kaliyaperumal
- Nizhalgal Ravi as Prathap
- Kitty as Kurian
- Janagaraj as Beeda Kathavarayan
- Senthil as Arivazhagan
- Raja as Saravanan
- Shakthi Kumar as Sakthivel
- Vinu Chakravarthy as Chokkalingam
- Crazy Mohan as Ayyasaamy
- Ponnambalam as Ponnambalam
- Thalapathy Dinesh as Rajendran
- Suppuni as a dwarf relative
- Halwa Vasu as Arunchalam's friend
- Nandagopal as a street vendor
- Swaminathan as Swaminathan
- Manorama as Lakshmi
- Vadivukkarasi as Senior Vedhavalli
- Vennira Aadai Nirmala as Umayal
- K. R. Vatsala as Janaki
- Anju Aravind as Arundhati
- Pallavi as a Kannada-speaking relative
- T. V. Varadarajan as a news reader
- GK as film producer
- Suresh Chakravarthy as television reporter
- Ramesh Prabha as television reporter who questions Arunachalam
- Ambika as Meenakshiyammal (Special appearance)
- Sundar C in a cameo appearance as a reporter in the song "Singam Ondru"
- Sridhar as Dancer in the song "Mathadu Mathadu"
- Harikumar as Dancer in the song "Athanda Ithanda"

== Production ==
After the success of Muthu in 1995, Rajinikanth took a year out dabbling in politics and taking a sabbatical before announcing that his next film would be Arunachalam written by Crazy Mohan. It was announced that the film would be produced to help eight of his struggling film industry colleagues and it was incorrectly earlier reported that the film would be produced under his newly floated Rajini Arts banner. It was indicated that some of the people who the film would go on to cause benefits for included Kalakendra Govindharajan who introduced Rajinikanth in his production Apoorva Raagangal (1975), Kalaignyanam who featured Rajinikanth in the lead role for the first time with his production Bairavi (1978) and brothers Ramji and Babji who produced some of the actor's early hits, Kaali (1980) and Garjanai (1980). Furthermore, collections would also be shared between the family of Sathya Studio Padmanabhan, actress Pandari Bai, actor V. K. Ramasamy and producer Madurai Nagaraja.

Initial reports had also titled the film as Kuberan and Meshtri, but Arunachalam was eventually retained. The plot of the film was inspired by George Barr McCutcheon's 1902 novel Brewster's Millions. The director Sundar C has stated that he did not like the story of Arunachalam but he did it because he did not want to miss an opportunity to work with Rajinikanth. He also mentioned that Rajinikanth is the one who called and narrated him the story and asked him to direct. Initially the lead heroine of the film was expected to be Meena, who had featured in Rajinikanth's Muthu before Soundarya and Rambha were signed on as heroines. The initial cast list released to the media also had Jayaram in the cast of the film as well as Vignesh, who was later replaced by Raja. Manorama was also added to the cast, surprising some media as she had caused controversy the previous year by lashing out at Rajinikanth's political motives. The filming was held in a star hotel at Hyderabad for 20 days.

== Soundtrack ==
The music was composed by Deva. The song "Nagumo" had two versions, Hariharan's version was included in soundtrack only, while another version with the vocals of Krishnaraj (who originally rendered the track version of the song) was featured in the film only after Rajinikanth was impressed with his rendering. The audio was released under the music label "Big B" of Amitabh Bachchan now the audio rights are currently acquired by Think Music. The tune of "Alli Alli Anarkali" was lifted from the songs "Ladki Ladki" from Shreemaan Aashique (1993), which was composed by Nadeem–Shravan and "Tutak Tutak Tutiyan" from Ghar Ka Chiraag (1989), which was composed by Bappi Lahiri.

Track listing
No.	Title	Lyrics	Singer(s)	Length
1.	"Athanda Ethanda"	Vairamuthu	S. P. Balasubrahmanyam	5:37
2.	"Alli Alli Anarkili"	Palani Bharathi	Mano, Swarnalatha	5:03
3.	"Mathadu Mathadu"	Palani Bharathi	S. P. Balasubrahmanyam, Sujatha Mohan, Meera, Manorama	5:57
4.	"Nagumo"	Vairamuthu	Hariharan, K. S. Chithra	4:32
5.	"Nagumo" (film version)	Vairamuthu	Krishnaraj, K. S. Chithra	4.32
6.	"Singam Ondru"	Vairamuthu	Malaysia Vasudevan	4:45
7.	"Thalai Maganae"	Kalidasan	S. P. Balasubramanyam	2:18
8.	"Theme Music" (Instrumental)	–	–	1:23
Total length:				29:35

== Release and reception ==
Arunachalam was released theatrically on 10 April 1997. The Hindu wrote on 18 April, "Arunachalam contains all the elements that provide escapist entertainment [...] humour, fairplay, love, feud occupy the frames". K. N. Vijiyan of New Straits Times wrote, "Go with an open mind and you will enjoy this movie". R. P. R. of Kalki gave a negative review, panning the weak screenplay, many of the montage shots after interval in bits and pieces, Crazy Mohan's dialogues lacking humour, Deva's music though he praised Rajinikanth's acting for rescuing the film but the technicians seems to have let him down and concluded Arunachalam did not do it despite the Lord saying that he should give great happiness to the fans in this Tamil New Year. The film was declared a box office success, although not as big as Rajinikanth's previous films Baashha and Muthu (both 1995). It had a theatrical run of over 204 days and collected around ₹32 crore (equivalent to ₹178 crore or US$19 million in 2026) worldwide.

== Awards ==
Arunachalam won three Tamil Nadu State Film Awards, including Best Film. Super Subbarayan and Gopi Kanth won for Best Stunt Coordinator and Best Art Director respectively.
