= Suyamariyadhai =

1992 Tamil film

- Directed by: R. Vijayganesh
- Written by: R. Vijayganesh
- Produced by: R. K. Ramakrishnan
- Starring: Karthik; Pallavi
- Cinematography: M. Kesavan
- Edited by: P. R. Shanmugam
- Music by: Sivaji Raja
- Production company: Sri Vadivudai Amman Creations
- Release date: 24 July 1992
- Running time: 120 minutes
- Country: India
- Language: Tamil

Suyamariyadhai (transl. Self-respect) is a 1992 Indian Tamil-language action drama film, directed by R. Vijayganesh, starring Karthik and Pallavi. It was released on 24 July 1992.

== Plot ==
Vijay IPS (Karthik) is an honest Assistant commissioner of police who tries to capture the criminal Muthukarrupan. Muthukarrupan has now turned hotel manager and is known under the name of JK. The criminal's partner is Jayaraj (Senthamarai), a corrupt police officer. Vijay and Rekha (Pallavi) fall in love with each other. In the meantime, he becomes friends with Raj (Rajthilak).

In the past, Vijay's sister Durga (K. R. Vijaya), an unmarried famous singer, brought her siblings, Bhavani and Vijay. Jayaraj, humiliated by Durga one day, revenged by sending her to jail. Bhavani's marriage was cancelled and Bhavani then committed suicide.

Vijay later realizes that Rekha is Jayaraj's daughter. Jayaraj even agrees to marry his daughter to Vijay but he doesn't recognize Vijay. Therefore, Vijay hides Durga's identity. One day, Jayaraj found his daughter in a brothel because of Vijay's conspiracy.

Raj turns out to be an undercover spy who worked with Vijay. So Vijay and Raj planned to kill the heartless Muthukarrupan.

== Cast ==
- Karthik as ACP Vijay IPS
- Pallavi as Rekha
- Rajthilak as Raj
- V. K. R. Raghunath as Muthukarrupan (JK)
- K. R. Vijaya as Durga, Vijay's sister
- Senthamarai as Jayaraj
- V. K. Ramasamy as a policeman
- S. S. Chandran as Arjuna, a policeman
- K. K. Soundar as Ponnambalam
- Raja Bhadar
- Oru Viral Krishna Rao
- Kokko Muthu
- Jayalalita as Shakeela
- Devibala
- C. K. Saraswathi
- Thalapathy Dinesh
- Nethran

== Production ==
The film began production in 1986 under the title Padhavi. A scene with Karthik and Pallavi was shot at Adyar Boat Club. The film was said to be produced by K. R. Vijaya's brother K. R. Narayanan.

== Soundtrack ==
The soundtrack was composed by Sivaji Raja, with lyrics written by Senguttuvan and Vaali.

Song	Singer(s)	Duration
"Raagam Thaalam"	P. Susheela	4:26
"Vaa Maa Vaa"	S. P. Balasubrahmanyam, P. Susheela	4:10
"Vanampadi Naane"	Chandran, Renuka Devi	3:22
"Vanmeedu Megham"	Karthik, Malaysia Vasudevan	3:28

== Critical reception ==
The Indian Express wrote, "The film has nothing to offer to the audience except the song sequences".
