= Aayiram Nilave Vaa =

- Title card
- Directed by: A. S. Prakasam
- Written by: A. S. Prakasam
- Produced by: M. K. M. Zawahir; Chandra Pragasam
- Starring: Karthik; Sulakshana
- Cinematography: Kumar Govindan
- Edited by: V. Rajagopal
- Music by: Ilaiyaraaja
- Production company: New Wave Pictures
- Release date: 15 July 1983
- Country: India
- Language: Tamil

Aayiram Nilave Vaa (transl. Come, thousand moons) is a 1983 Indian Tamil-language film written and directed by A. S. Prakasam. The film stars Karthik and Sulakshana. It was released on 15 July 1983.

== Plot ==
Chandhar is the manager of an estate in Ooty. He also moonlights as a writer for a popular magazine and has a large fan following. One day, he receives a new guest, Devi, who pretends to be blind and has a mysterious backstory. She is also his biggest fan, and the two have exchanged letters, with Chandhar having proposed to her through their correspondence.

As love begins to blossom between them, Suri, Chandhar's identical twin, enters the scene. Suri was adopted by the estate owner and feels neglected by his own family, which leads him to fall into bad habits like excessive drinking. Chandhar and Suri have a strained relationship, being complete opposites in character. One day, they get into a physical fight over Devi, during which Suri dies, bleeding from his mouth. In the aftermath, Chandhar decides to impersonate Suri, dressing in his clothes and adopting his persona.

Everyone believes that it is Chandhar who has died, while in reality, it is Suri. Devi, misled by this, begins to hate Chandhar, thinking that Suri had killed him during their fight. Devastated, she attempts to end her life by inhaling toxic fumes in her car, but Chandhar intervenes and saves her. Chandar is welcomed as Suri with garlands by Loala. He reveals to everyone in the estate except Devi that he is actually Chandhar and that Suri was the one who died. He asks for any punishment they deem fit. Then Loala calls police, and he is arrested. Meanwhile, one of the estate’s guests, informs Devi that it was Suri who died, not Chandhar. He also tells her that he has evidence proving Chandhar’s innocence: Loala had poisoned Suri’s alcohol, which ultimately caused his death.

Realizing the truth, Devi rushes to meet Chandhar and begs him to accept her, but Chandhar hesitates, telling her that it's too late for her to realize the truth. In despair, Devi puts on her glasses, vowing not to see the world again. In court, the estate guest presents the truth, revealing that Chandhar is innocent. Loala confesses that she had poisoned Suri because she had loved him for years, and when he planned to marry another woman, she couldn't bear it. The judge sentences Loala to five years in prison. In the end, Chandhar and Devi reunite.

== Cast ==
- Karthik as Chandhar and Suri
- Sulakshana as Devi
- Silk Smitha as Loala
- Nagesh as the estate guest

== Production ==
The costumes for Karthik were designed by Nayim. Since the director demanded fashionable outfits for Karthik's characters, he designed shirt with open collar, a leather jacket on shirt alongside shawl.

== Soundtrack ==
The music was composed by Ilaiyaraaja. This was his 200th film as composer. The song "Devathai Ilam" was adapted from the song "Kelade Nimageega", which Ilaiyaraaja had composed for the 1981 Kannada film Geetha while the song "Andharangam Yavume" was later reused as "Manchu Kurise" in the Telugu film Abhinandana (1988), also starring Karthik.

Song	Singers	Lyrics
"Devathai Ilam"	S. P. Balasubrahmanyam	Vairamuthu
"Andharangam"	S. P. Balasubrahmanyam	Pulamaipithan
"Ooty Kuliru"	Malaysia Vasudevan, S. P. Sailaja	Vairamuthu
"Kanni Ilam"	S. Janaki	Vairamuthu
"Gangai Aatril"	P. Susheela	Pulamaipithan

== Critical reception ==
Jayamanmadhan of Kalki felt the good suspense could have been handled briskly but the story struggles heavily in the hands of Prakasam. Balumani of Anna praised the acting of Karthik and Sulakshana, music, humour and cinematography but found the story lifeless.
