= P. Sai Suresh =

Indian film editor

- Born: 7 July 1964 (age 61); Thiruvananthapuram, Kerala, India
- Occupation: Film editor
- Years active: 1992-present

P. Sai Suresh is an Indian film editor, who has worked on Tamil language films. He regularly collaborated in ventures directed by Sundar C in the 1990s and 2000s, notably working on projects including Arunachalam (1997), Suyamvaram (1999) and Anbe Sivam (2003).

== Career ==
Sai Suresh has edited over a hundred films, and in 1999 he notably won the Tamil Nadu State Film Award for Best Editor for his work on Unakkaga Ellam Unakkaga (1999). Often collaborating with director Sundar C, Sai Suresh was amongst the most prolific editors in terms of numbers in the 1990s, often working on action, village and comedy films in medium budget productions.

In 2012, he worked on his 80th film, the romantic comedy Ishtam starring Vimal.

== Selected filmography ==
=== Tamil ===
- Sevagan (1992)
- Prathap (1993)
- Jai Hind (1994)
- Sarigamapadani (1994)
- Watchman Vadivel (1994)
- Maaman Magal (1995)
- Pullakuttikaran (1995)
- Villadhi Villain (1995)
- Mettukudi (1996)
- Janakiraman (1997)
- Arunachalam (1997)
- Periya Idathu Mappillai (1997)
- Periya Manushan (1997)
- Naam Iruvar Namakku Iruvar (1998)
- Thayin Manikodi (1998)
- Suyamvaram (1999)
- Unakkaga Ellam Unakkaga (1999)
- Azhagarsamy (1999)
- Unnai Thedi (1999)
- Kannan Varuvaan (2000)
- Ullam Kollai Poguthae (2001)
- Rishi (2001)
- Azhagana Naatkal (2001)
- Vedham (2001)
- Pesadha Kannum Pesume (2002)
- Ezhumalai (2002)
- Anbe Sivam (2003)
- Winner (2003)
- Parasuram (2003)
- Ottran (2003)
- Giri (2004)
- Shock (2004)
- London (2005)
- Madrasi (2006)
- Thoothukudi (2006)
- Vanakkam Thalaiva (2006)
- Vathiyar (2006)
- Thiru Ranga (2007)
- 18 Vayasu Puyale (2007)
- Veeramum Eeramum (2007)
- Thozha (2008)
- Karthik Anitha (2009)
- Madurai Sambavam (2009)
- Agam Puram (2010)
- Ayyan (2011)
- Vikadakavi (2011)
- Maharaja (2011)
- Ishtam (2012)
- Meeravudan Krishna (2012)
- Kadhale Ennai Kadhali (2013)
- Onbadhule Guru (2013)
- Vethu Vettu (2015)
- Iru Kadhal Oru Kadhai (2015)
- Kurangu Kaila Poo Maalai (2015)
- Muthuramalingam (2017)
- Munthal (2018)
- Oviyavai Vitta Yaru (2018)
- Vilambaram (2019)
- Gilli Bambaram Goli (2019)
- Ganesha Meendum Santhipom (2019)

=== Other Languages ===
Kannada

- Shanti Shanti Shanti (1998)
- Jeeva (2009)
- Gokula Krishna (2012)
- Parijatha (2012)

Malayalam

- Yugapurushan (2010)
- Lucky Darbar (2011)
- Kappiri Thuruthu (2016)
