= Ullathai Allitha =

- Theatrical release poster
- Directed by: Sundar C
- Written by: K. Selva Bharathy (dialogues)
- Screenplay by: Sundar C
- Story by: Sundar C
- Produced by: N. Prabhavathy; N. Jyothi Lakshmi; N. Vishnuram; N. Raghuram
- Starring: Karthik; Rambha; Goundamani
- Cinematography: U. K. Senthil Kumar
- Edited by: B. S. Vasu
- Music by: Sirpy
- Production company: Ganga Gowri Productions
- Release date: 15 January 1996
- Running time: 148 minutes
- Country: India
- Language: Tamil

Ullathai Allitha (transl. Pour your heart) is a 1996 Indian Tamil-language romantic comedy film written and directed by Sundar C. The film stars Karthik, Rambha and Goundamani in the lead roles, with Manivannan, Jai Ganesh, Senthil, and Jyothi Meena in supporting roles. It revolves around a man who runs away from home to avoid a forced marriage, but unknowingly falls in love with the same woman.

Ullathai Allitha is heavily based on the Tamil films Sabaash Meena (1958) and Bommalattam (1968), and the Hindi film Andaz Apna Apna (1994). The film was scored by Sirpy, photographed by U. K. Senthil Kumar and edited by B. S. Vasu, with filming taking place predominantly in the Fernhills Palace, Ooty. The film was released on 15 January 1996. It became a major commercial success and had 275 day run at theatres across Tamil Nadu. The film was remade in Telugu as Veedevadandi Babu (1997) and in Kannada as Galate Aliyandru (2000).

== Plot ==
In Chennai, Raja is the only son of Chandrasekhar, a retired colonel who raises him very strictly. Chandrasekhar decides to get Raja married to his friend Viswanathan's daughter Indhu. Vishwanathan is a tea estate owner and one of the richest men in Ooty. Raja misunderstands another girl as Indhu (Chandrasekhar's nephew Shankar switched Indhu's photo with another girl's) and decides to run away from Chennai to escape the forced marriage. Unknown to Chandrasekhar, Shankar plans to grab his properties by triggering Raja to leave the house.

Raja reaches Ooty, where he meets Vasu, a con artist, and despite initial setbacks both become friends. One day, Raja sees Indhu in Ooty and gets attracted towards her, not knowing that she was the girl fixed for him by his father. Raja follows Indhu and finds her home. Later Raja secures a driver job in Viswanathan's home to woo Indhu.

Raja gives his family ring to Vasu to prevent him from disclosing the truth to Viswanathan, but Viswanathan misunderstands Vasu as Chandrasekhar's son as he wears the ring now. Viswanathan brings Vasu to his home and introduces him as Indhu's fiancé. One day, a gang tries to attack Vasu, but he is saved by Raja, which makes him understand that there is someone looking out to kill him, so Raja decides to remain incognito as a driver to unearth the reason behind the goons trying to attack him.

Viswanathan informs Chandrasekhar that his son is found but asks him not to come immediately to see him as he dislikes his father. Meanwhile, at Ooty, Raja tries to impress Indhu, while Vasu is attracted towards Viswanathan's personal secretary Meena. Slowly, love blossoms between Indhu and Raja. Suddenly, Chandrasekhar comes to Ooty to Viswanathan's home to meet Raja. A problem erupts as Raja is incognito as a driver. Both Raja and Vasu try to manage by roaming together for a few days so that they can convince both Viswanathan and Chandrasekhar.

Meanwhile, Shankar gets furious upon knowing that Raja is found. He befriends Kasinathan, who is Viswanathan's twin brother. Kasinathan is a criminal who has just been released from jail. They kidnap Viswanathan, and Kasinathan comes to Viswanathan's place so that he can enjoy all the properties and wealth. Doubt erupts for Raja and Vasu upon seeing Kasinathan as he spends money lavishly, compared to the stingy Viswanathan.

Raja and Vasu secretly follow Kasinathan and finds the whereabouts of Viswanathan and the plan behind his kidnap. Raja is shocked to see his cousin Shankar there as he is the mastermind behind all the events. A fight follows, where in the end, Shankar and Kasinathan get arrested. It is also revealed that Raja is the son of Chandrasekhar. Raja unites with Indhu, while Vasu unites with Meena.

== Cast ==
- Karthik as Raja
- Rambha as Indhu (Voice dubbed by Jayageetha)
- Goundamani as Vasu
- Manivannan as Viswanathan and Kasinathan
- Jai Ganesh as Chandrasekar
- Senthil as Viswanathan's manager
- Pandu as Viswanathan's manager
- Jyothi Meena as Meena
- Kazan Khan as Shankar
- Vichu Vishwanath as Chandrasekar's manager
- Karuppu Subbiah as Seth

== Production ==
The story and screenplay of Ullathai Allitha were written by Sundar C, who also directed the film, while the dialogues were written by K. Selva Bharathy. The film was produced by N. Prabhavathi, N. Jyothi Lakshmi, N. Vishnuram and N. Raghuram. Sundar said he initially planned the film as a romance film, but as he wrote the script further it became more of a comedy. It is heavily based on the Tamil films Sabaash Meena (1958) and Bommalattam (1968), while borrowing scenes from the Hindi film Andaz Apna Apna (1994). Vijay was initially offered the lead role, before Karthik was cast. Roja and Ravali were the initial choices for the lead female role, before Rambha was signed on; Roja declined due to scheduling conflicts with Parambarai and Tamizh Selvan (both 1996). Rambha was cast only two days before principal photography began.

During the making of the film, there was a misunderstanding and subsequent falling out between Rambha and one of the producers. For the filming of the song "Azhagiya Laila", Rambha wore different dresses for almost every scene, in addition to wigs. Cinematography was handled by U. K. Senthil Kumar, and editing by B. S. Vasu. The film was predominantly shot at the Fernhills Palace, Ooty. According to Sundar, the film's "hide-and-seek" sequence was improvised, as the script only mentioned "Chaos in Jai Ganesh's house leading to the kidnap of Mani Vannan".

== Soundtrack ==
The music was composed by Sirpy and lyrics were written by Palani Bharathi. Sundar chose Palani Bharathi after being impressed with his work on Pudhiya Mannargal (1994). All the songs from this film were plagiarised from various sources; "Azhagiya Laila" is based on "Ahla Ma Feki" by Hisham Abbas, "I Love You" is based on another Abbas song "Wana Amel Eih", "Adi Anarkali" is based on "In the Summertime" by Mungo Jerry, "Chittu Chittu Kuruvikku" is based on the Pakistani folk song "Laung Gawacha" and "Mama Nee Mama" is based on "Kinna Sohna Tainu" by Nusrat Fateh Ali Khan.

Track listing
No.	Title	Singer(s)	Length
1.	"Adi Anarkali"	Mano	4:34
2.	"Azhagiya Laila"	Mano	4:39
3.	"Chittu Chittu Kuruvikku"	Mano, Sujatha	4:29
4.	"I Love You Love You"	Mano, K. S. Chithra	4:29
5.	"Mama Nee Mama"	Mano, Geetha Sabesh	5:21
Total length:			23:32

== Release ==
Ullathai Allitha was released on 15 January 1996, during the week of Pongal, alongside another Karthik-starrer Kizhakku Mugam, and was more successful as the latter was a failure. The film achieved success after receiving good word-of-mouth reviews from audiences. After a slow start at the box office, the songs' success on television prompted audiences to visit cinemas.

== Critical reception ==
Ananda Vikatan rated the film 43 out of 100. The critic noted that Sundar deserved appreciation for lifting interesting scenes and ideas from older films and integrating them well in the screenplay in his own style, and the real hero of the film was Manivannan who was surprising with his comedic acting. Kalki gave the film a mixed review, but appreciated the comedy of Goundamani and Manivannan, calling them the film's real stars. D. S. Ramanujam of The Hindu wrote, "A full length comedy with enjoyable scenes, thanks to the screenplay and direction of C. Sundar, keeps the viewer in good cheer in Ganga Gowri Productions, Ullathai Alli Thaa [..] the director has the uncanny knack to fit these segments in his essay and then capping them with his new funfilled ideas, like topping a giant cone icecream with choice varieties, leading to humorous confusion over identities, bunglings by silly looking assassins, abduction and amorous ways of the elders".

== Cancelled sequel ==
A year after the success of Ullathai Allitha, Sundar had plans for making a sequel with the same cast returning. Although he prepared the storyline and script, he shelved the project after discussions with fellow actors. The sequel's story involved Raja moving to the United States to get over the supposed demise of Indhu, where he sees a lookalike of Indhu and falls in love with her.

== Remakes ==
The film was remade in Telugu as Veedevadandi Babu (1997) and in Kannada as Galate Aliyandru (2000).

== Legacy ==
The success of Ullathai Allitha paved way for numerous comedy films in Tamil cinema. Manivannan's dual roles in the film became among his best known roles. Goundamani's dialogue "Yov Military, Nee Enga Ya Inga?" (transl. Hey Military, what are you doing here?) entered Tamil vernacular, often used by people when unexpectedly running into their friends. The success of the film led Sundar to collaborate with Karthik in subsequent projects – Mettukudi (1996), Unakkaga Ellam Unakkaga (1999), Kannan Varuvaan (2000) and Azhagana Naatkal (2001). Azhagana Naatkal was compared by critics with Ullathai Allitha due to its similarity in sequences and characterisations. Sundar himself listed Ullathai Allitha as one of the favourite films he had directed. Subha J. Rao and K. Jeshi of The Hindu placed the film in league with other successful comedy films like Kadhalikka Neramillai (1964), Thillu Mullu (1981) and Michael Madana Kama Rajan (1990). Rambha, however, lamented that after the film's success it had become mandatory for her to wear a swimsuit in almost every film since. The song "Azhagiya Laila" was reused in the 2024 Malayalam film Guruvayoor Ambalanadayil.

== Bibliography ==
- Dhananjayan, G. (2011). The Best of Tamil Cinema, 1931 to 2010: 1977–2010. Galatta Media. OCLC 733724281.
