= Abhinandana =

1988 Indian film

- Theatrical release poster
- Directed by: Ashok Kumar
- Written by: Ashok Kumar
- Produced by: R. V. Ramana Murthy
- Starring: Karthik; Shobana; Sarath Babu; Rajya Lakshmi; J. V. Somayajulu
- Cinematography: Ashok Kumar
- Edited by: B. Lenin; V. T. Vijayan
- Music by: Ilaiyaraaja
- Production companies: Vauhini; Vijaya Gardens
- Distributed by: Lalitha Sri Combines
- Release date: 10 March 1988
- Country: India
- Language: Telugu

Abhinandana (transl. Commendation) is a 1988 Indian Telugu-language musical romance film written and directed by Ashok Kumar. It stars Karthik, Shobana, and Sarath Babu, with music composed by Ilaiyaraaja.

The film was a commercial success and received positive reviews upon release. Its soundtrack, considered one of Ilaiyaraaja's best in Telugu cinema, became a chartbuster and remains popular to this day. Abhinandana won three Nandi Awards, including Second Best Feature Film. It was later dubbed into Tamil as Kaadhal Geetham and remade in Kannada as Abhinandane (2005).

== Plot ==
Set in Kodaikanal, the story revolves around Rani, an aspiring dancer, who meets Raja, an aspiring painter and singer. They fall in love with each other as their mutual love for art unfolds at an arts institute/college. Rani's father wishes to get his daughter married soon. Rani is certain about convincing her father to accept Raja as her future spouse. The drama unfolds when Rani's pregnant sister Kamala and her husband Srikanth, along with their two kids visit from Chennai. Kamala's husband, who owns a recording studio, leaves for Chennai after a short stay in Kodaikanal.

After Kamala's accidental death, her father wishes to get Rani married to her brother—in-law Srikanth and take care of the two kids. Rani has to choose between Raja and looking after her sister's family. Raja cannot take this and takes to drinking as he loses hope of uniting with Rani. Unaware of Raja's connection to Rani, Srikanth meets Raja he notices Raja's artistic skills and offers him an opportunity to sing for an album at his recording studio. He introduces Raja to Rani at Rani's home before requesting Raja to live there until Raja's recording is complete.

Soon Rani's brother-in-law finds out that Rani is in love with Raja. How the individuals try to compromise and sacrifice for each other's aspirations and feelings forms the crux of the story.

== Cast ==
As per the film's opening credits:

- Sarath Babu as Srikanth
- Karthik as Raja
- Shobana as Rani
- Rajya Lakshmi as Kamala
- J. V. Somayajulu as Rani's father
- Chitti Babu as Servant
- Master Sathish
- Baby Swathi

== Soundtrack ==
The music for the film was composed by Ilaiyaraaja. Several songs were reused from his earlier compositions: "Ade Neevu" was adapted from "Ore Raagam", and "Rangulalo Kalavo" was taken from "Velli Nila Padhumai", both from Tamil movie Amudha Gaanam (1985). "Premaledhani" was adapted from "Naalum En Manam" from Tamil movie Nilavu Suduvathillai (1984). "Manchu Kurise Velalo" was reused from "Andharangam Yaavume" from Tamil movie Aayiram Nilave Vaa (1983), while "Eduta Neeve" was derived from "Ilalo" from Anveshana (1985), which itself was based on "Uyire Urave" from Tamil movie Anbin Mugavari (1985). The song "Manchu Kurise Velalo" later inspired the title of a 2018 film.

All lyrics are written by Acharya Aatreya.

Songs
No.	Title	Playback	Length
1.	"Ade Neevu"	S. P. Balasubrahmanyam
2.	"Chukkalanti"	S. Janaki
3.	"Chukkalanti" (Sad)	S. Janaki
4.	"Eduta Neeve"	S. P. Balasubrahmanyam
5.	"Manchu Kurise"	S. P. Balasubrahmanyam, S. Janaki
6.	"Prema Entha"	S. P. Balasubrahmanyam
7.	"Premaledani"	S. P. Balasubrahmanyam
8.	"Rangulalo Kalavo"	S. P. Balasubrahmanyam, S. Janaki

== Awards ==
Nandi Awards

- Second Best Feature Film - Silver - R. V. Ramana Murthy
- Best Male Playback Singer - S. P. Balasubrahmanyam (for singing "Rangulalo Kalavo")
- Special Jury Award - Karthik
