= Sirpy =

Indian film score and soundtrack composer

- Also known as: R. Narayanan Sirpy
- Born: R. Naray
- Occupation: Film score and soundtrack composer
- Years active: 1992–present

R. Narayanan Sirpy, known by his stage name Sirpy, is an Indian film score and soundtrack composer. He has predominantly scored music for Tamil films apart from working in Telugu and Malayalam films. He has also sung a few of his own compositions.

== Career ==
Sirpy debuted as a music composer in 1992 for the film Manobala's Senbaga Thottam and has composed for over 50 commercial and critically acclaimed feature films. Manobala initially wanted him to compose for Rajinikanth starrer Oorkavalan; however Veerappan felt it would be tough for him to handle songs for a film of a star, hence replaced with Shankar–Ganesh.

== Personal life ==
His son Nandhan Ram made his acting debut as lead actor with the film Palli Paruvathile (2017).

== Awards ==
He has won the Best Music director award from the Government of Tamil Nadu for the year 2002 for the film Unnai Ninaithu and the Kalaimamani Award in the year 1997.

== Television ==
Year	Name of Television Show	Role	Network
2024	Super Singer Season 10	Guest	Star Vijay

== Discography ==
=== Tamil films ===
Year	Film title	Notes
1992	Senbaga Thottam	
1992	Annai Vayal	
1993	Gokulam	
1993	Naan Pesa Ninaipathellam	
1993	En Maamavukku Nalla Manasu	
1994	Chinna Madam	
1994	Ulavaali	
1994	Mani Rathnam	
1994	Nattamai	
1995	Padikkara Vayasula	
1995	Jameen Kottai	
1996	Ullathai Allitha	
1996	Amman Kovil Vaasalile	
1996	Avathara Purushan	
1996	Sundara Purushan	
1996	Mettukudi	
1996	Namma Ooru Raasa	
1996	Purushan Pondatti	
1996	Selva	
1997	Kathirunda Kadhal	
1997	Vivasaayi Magan	25th Film
1997	Dhinamum Ennai Gavani	
1997	Raasi	
1997	Nandhini	
1997	Periya Idathu Mappillai	
1997	Adrasakkai Adrasakkai	
1997	Ganga Gowri	
1997	Thedinen Vanthathu	
1997	Janakiraman	
1997	Poochudava	
1998	Moovendhar	
1998	Udhavikku Varalaamaa	
1998	Ini Ellam Sugame	
1998	Unakkum Enakkum Kalyanam	Not Released
1999	Poomaname Vaa	
1999	Suyamvaram	
1999	Manaivikku Mariyadhai	
1999	Kudumba Sangili	
2000	Kannan Varuvaan	
2001	Pullanalum Pondatti	
2001	Thaalikaatha Kaaliamman	
2001	Vinnukkum Mannukkum	
2001	Seerivarum Kaalai	
2001	Kunguma Pottu Gounder	
2001	Vadagupatti Maapillai	
2001	Mr. Narathar	Not Released
2002	Varushamellam Vasantham	
2002	Unnai Ninaithu	Winner Tamil Nadu State Film Award for Best Music Director
2003	Pavalakodi	
2003	Banda Paramasivam	
2003	Eera Nilam	
2003	Nadhi Karaiyinile	
2003	Thirumagan	Not Released
2005	Unnai Enakku Pidichuruku	50th Film
2006	Kodambakkam	
2006	Boys and Girls	
2009	Unnai Kann Theduthe	
2009	Nesi	
2024	Mudakkaruthaan	

=== Other language films ===
Year	Film title	Language	Notes
1994	Captain	Telugu	
1994	O Thandri O Koduku	Telugu	
1995	Arabikadaloram	Malayalam	
1996	Railway Coolie	Telugu	
1997	Veedevadandi Babu	Telugu	Remake of Ullathai Allitha
1997	Nenu Premisthunnanu	Telugu	Remake of Aniyathipravu
2004	Cheppave Chirugali	Telugu	Remake of Unnai Ninaithu; 2 songs only
2011	Manchivadu	Telugu	Remake of Varushamellam Vasantham; all songs reused

Television

- 2018 – Chandrakumari (Sun TV)

Singer

- Yenadi Kanne (Janakiraman)
- Ennai Vilai (Amman Kovil Vaasalile)
- Raja Rajane (Sundara Purushan)
- Indha Poonthendral (Mettukudi)
- Andangakka (Namma Ooru Raasa)
- Pullu Venum (Purushan Pondatti)
- Karisakkaattu Kuyile (Eera Nilam)

== Filmography ==
- Ganga Gowri (1997), cameo in song "Kadhalare Kadhalare"
