= Rambha (actress) =

Indian actress (born 1976)

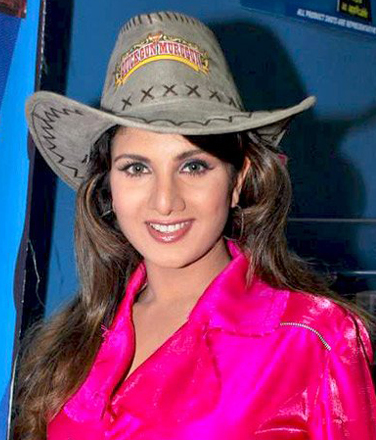
- Rambha in 2010
- Born: Yeedi Vijayalakshmi; 5 June 1976 (age 50); Vijayawada, Andhra Pradesh, India
- Occupations: Actress; film producer; TV Judge
- Years active: 1991–2011 (as an actress); 2017–present (as a TV host / judge)
- Spouse: Indrakumar Pathmanathan (m. 2010)
- Children: 3

Yeedi Vijayalakshmi (born 5 June 1976), known professionally as Rambha, is an Indian former actress. She was one of the prominent actresses in Indian cinema in the 1990s and early 2000s. In an acting career spanning almost two decades, Rambha had appeared in more than 100 films across eight languages, predominantly in Telugu and Tamil, in addition to Hindi, Malayalam, and Kannada, along with a few Bengali, Bhojpuri and English films. Rambha made her debut with the Malayalam film Sargam. She moved to Toronto, Canada after her marriage.

== Early life and background ==
Rambha was born as Yeedi Vijayalakshmi in Vijayawada, Andhra Pradesh on 5 June 1976 into a Telugu family. She did her schooling at Atkinsons Senior Secondary School, Vijayawada. While she was studying in her seventh standard, she acted as Ammavaru (Mother Goddess) for her school's annual day competition. The event was attended by director Hariharan who stayed in contact and later introduced her as the female lead in Malayalam film, Sargam. Her first on-screen name was Amrutha, which she later changed as Rambha after the character name in her Telugu debut movie Aa Okkati Adakku.

== Career ==
Rambha gave up her education aged 15 and then started her career with Hariharan's Malayalam film Sargam (1992) opposite Vineeth. The film performed well at the box office, and she was spotted by director E. V. V. Satyanarayana who then cast her in the Telugu film Aa Okkati Adakku (1992), where she was paired opposite Rajendra Prasad. The film performed well and led to several film offers for the actress from several different film industries across India. At the height of her career in the late 1990s, Rambha deliberately continued to pick glamorous roles to garner film offers. In successful films such as Hitler (1997) starring Chiranjeevi, Rambha appeared in roles which were inconsequential to the plot and purely depicted her as the lead actor's love interest.

She started her career as a producer with help of her brother in Three Roses (2003), in which Jyothika, Laila and Rambha played the lead characters.

Rambha has acted in several languages and maintained a successful balance in Malayalam, Telugu, Tamil, Hindi, Kannada, Bhojpuri and Bengali. In 2010, Rambha shot alongside Prakash Raj for a thriller film titled Vidiyum Varai Kathiru. The film was shot in three languages namely Tamil, Telugu and Malayalam, but it did not have a theatrical release.

After her marriage she gave up films as she felt her popularity in films had faded away as she noticed that she was not getting meaty roles as she used to and has judged a very popular Tamil TV show Maanada Mayilada, and the Telugu dance show Dhee. After a long gap she came back from Toronto, she appeared as a judge of Zee Telugu dance show ABCD-Anybody Can Dance and judged Kings of Comedy Juniors on Vijay TV.

She is a brand ambassador for Kolors health care, Chennai.

== Personal life ==
Rambha married Indrakumar Pathmanathan, a Canada-based Sri Lankan Tamil businessman, on 8 April 2010 at Karnataka Kalyana Mandapam in Tirumala. They settled in Toronto. They have two daughters and a son.

== Filmography ==
- In the order of languages in which she appeared the most to the least.

=== Telugu ===
| Year | Film | Role | Notes |
|---|---|---|---|
| 1992 | Aa Okkati Adakku | Rambha | Telugu Debut film |
| 1993 | Evandi Aavida Vachindi | Jhansi | |
| 1993 | Tholi Muddu | Divya | |
| 1993 | Pelli Gola | | |
| 1993 | Rowdy Annayya | Jyoti | |
| 1993 | Chinna Alludu | Sita | |
| 1993 | Sarigamalu | Jyothi | |
| 1994 | Bhairava Dweepam | Yakshini | Cameo appearance |
| 1994 | Yes Nenante Nene | Rani | |
| 1994 | Namaste Anna | Saccha | |
| 1994 | Pachcha Toranam | Latha Devi | |
| 1994 | Hello Brother | Herself | Cameo appearance in the song "Kanne Pettaro" |
| 1994 | Bangaru Kutumbam | Pushpa | |
| 1994 | Muddula Priyudu | Usha | |
| 1994 | Allari Premikudu | Bhavani | |
| 1994 | Hello Alludu | Rani | |
| 1994 | M. Dharmaraju M.A | Seeta | |
| 1995 | Alluda Majaka | Bobby | |
| 1995 | Maatho Pettukoku | Lakshmi | |
| 1995 | Maya Bazaar | Herself | Cameo appearance |
| 1995 | Vetagadu | Seema | |
| 1995 | Khaidi Inspector | | |
| 1996 | Bombay Priyudu | Raga Sudha | Nominated-Filmfare Award for Best Actress – Telugu |
| 1996 | Sri Krishnarjuna Vijayam | Apasara | |
| 1996 | Akkada Ammayi Ikkada Abbayi | Herself | Cameo appearance in the song "Chaligali Jhummandhi" |
| 1997 | Hitler | Bujji | |
| 1997 | Mama Bagunnava | Jaya | |
| 1998 | Ganesh | Priya | |
| 1998 | Bavagaru Bagunnara? | Swapna | |
| 1998 | Love Story 1999 | Swapna | |
| 1999 | Iddaru Mitrulu | Herself | Cameo appearance in the song "Hey Rukkuman" |
| 1999 | Mechanic Mavayya | Rani | |
| 2000 | Kodanda Ramudu | Mounika | |
| 2000 | Okkadu Chalu | Rambha | |
| 2000 | Choosoddaam Randi | Geeta | |
| 2000 | Moodu Mukkalaata | Lahari | |
| 2001 | Mrugaraju | Herself | Cameo appearance in the song "Ramaiah Paddaleti" |
| 2003 | Sriramachandrulu | Sundari Devi | |
| 2003 | Neetho Vastha | | |
| 2003 | Naaga | Herself | Cameo appearance |
| 2005 | Alex | Deepika | |
| 2006 | Neeku Naaku | Lakshmi | |
| 2006 | Gopi – Goda Meeda Pilli | Goddess Lakshmi | Extended Cameo |
| 2007 | Desamuduru | Herself | Cameo appearance in the song "Attaantode Ittaantode" |
| 2007 | Yamadonga | Herself | Cameo appearance in the song "Nachore Nachore" |
| 2008 | Donga Sachinollu | Kavya | |

=== Tamil ===
| Year | Film | Role | Notes |
|---|---|---|---|
| 1993 | Uzhavan | Eshwari | Debut Tamil film |
| 1996 | Ullathai Allitha | Indhu | Debut Lead role |
| 1996 | Sengottai | Yamuna | |
| 1996 | Sundara Purushan | Valli | |
| 1996 | Sivasakthi | Priya | |
| 1997 | Dharma Chakkaram | Vijayalakshmi | |
| 1997 | Arunachalam | Nandhini Rangachari | |
| 1997 | Raasi | Meena | |
| 1997 | V.I.P | Indhu | |
| 1997 | Adimai Changili | Radha | |
| 1997 | Janakiraman | Gayathri | |
| 1998 | Ninaithen Vandhai | Swapna | Nominated-Filmfare Award for Best Actress – Tamil |
| 1998 | Kaathala Kaathala | Janaki | |
| 1998 | Desiya Geetham | Mayil | |
| 1999 | Endrendrum Kadhal | Meenu | |
| 1999 | Kadhalar Dhinam | Herself | Cameo appearance in song "Oh Mariya" |
| 1999 | Poomagal Oorvalam | Kavitha | |
| 1999 | Suyamvaram | Urvashi | |
| 1999 | Minsara Kanna | Priya | |
| 1999 | Unakkaga Ellam Unakkaga | Indhu | |
| 1999 | Unnaruge Naan Irundhal | Herself | Guest appearance |
| 2000 | Sudhandhiram | Divya | |
| 2000 | Kunguma Pottu Gounder | Alamelu Kandhasamy | |
| 2000 | Anbudan | Nimmi | |
| 2001 | Aanandham | Renuka Madhavan | |
| 2001 | Azhagana Naatkal | Indhu | |
| 2003 | Military | Lakshmi | |
| 2003 | Three Roses | Chaaru | |
| 2003 | Banda Paramasivam | Manju Cheran | |
| 2004 | Thilak | Herself | Cameo appearance in song "Izhutha Izhuthu" |
| 2004 | Azhagiya Theeye | Herself | Cameo appearance in song "Dil Mera Loot Liya" |
| 2004 | Chatrapathy | Herself | Cameo appearance in song "Ore Oru Raathirikku" |
| 2005 | Sukran | Herself | Cameo appearance in song "Saathikadi" |
| 2009 | Oru Kadhalan Oru Kadhali | Lakshmi | |
| 2010 | Pen Singam | Mythili | Extended Cameo |

=== Hindi ===
| Year | Film | Role | Notes |
|---|---|---|---|
| 1995 | Jallaad | Koyal | Hindi Debut film |
| 1996 | Jurmana | Priya Kumar Saxena | |
| 1996 | Daanveer | Chitra | |
| 1996 | Jung | Madhu | |
| 1997 | Qahar | Radha | |
| 1997 | Judwaa | Rupa | |
| 1997 | Sajna | | |
| 1998 | Gharwali Baharwali | Manisha Verma | |
| 1998 | Bandhan | Jyoti | |
| 1999 | Main Tere Pyaar Mein Pagal | Sonali | |
| 2000 | Krodh | Pooja Varma | |
| 2000 | Beti No.1 | Priya Bhatnagar | |
| 2001 | Kyo Kii... Main Jhuth Nahin Bolta | Tara | |
| 2002 | Jaani Dushman: Ek Anokhi Kahani | Nita | |
| 2002 | Pyaar Diwana Hota Hai | | Cameo appearance |
| 2004 | Dukaan: Pila House | Kasthuribai | |

=== Kannada ===
| Year | Film | Role | Notes |
|---|---|---|---|
| 1993 | Server Somanna | Sudha | Kannada Debut film |
| 1993 | Kempaiah IPS | Chempa | |
| 1999 | O Premave | Prema | |
| 2000 | Panchali | | |
| 2001 | Baava Baamaida | Geetha | |
| 2004 | Sahukara | Ranganayaki | |
| 2005 | Pandu Ranga Vittala | Rambha | |
| 2006 | Gandugali Kumara Rama | | |
| 2007 | Anatharu | Herself | Cameo |

=== Malayalam ===
| Year | Film | Role | Notes |
|---|---|---|---|
| 1992 | Sargam | Thangamani | Malayalam Debut film |
| 1992 | Champakulam Thachan | Devi | |
| 1998 | Sidhartha | Hema | |
| 2003 | Chronic Bachelor | Bhama | |
| 2004 | Mayilattam | Mythili | |
| 2005 | Kochi Rajavu | Meenakshi | |
| 2007 | Payum Puli | Malli | |
| 2008 | Kabadi Kabadi | Pooja/Sneha | Double role |
| 2011 | The Filmstaar | Rambha | |

=== Other language films ===
| Year | Film | Role | Language | Notes |
|---|---|---|---|---|
| 2005 | Dada | Meera | Bengali | Bengali Debut film |
| 2005 | Chita | Rupa | Bengali | |
| 2006 | Refugee | Julie | Bengali | |
| 2007 | Ram Balram | Mausammi | Bhojpuri | Bhojpuri Debut film |
| 2007 | Rasik Balma | Nandita | Bhojpuri | |
| 2007 | Banke Bihari M.L.A. | Lawyer Manya | Bhojpuri | |
| 2009 | Quick Gun Murugun | Mango Dolly | English | |

=== Television ===
| Year | Series/Shows | Channel | Notes |
|---|---|---|---|
| 2002-2005 | Metti Oli | Sun TV | Special appearance |
| 2009-2012 | Manada Mayilada | Kalaignar TV | As a judge for Season 2, 3, 5 and 7 |
| 2011 | Dhee Ultimate Dance Show | ETV Telugu | As a judge for Season 4 |
| 2014 | Jodi No 1 | Star Vijay | As a judge for Season 8 |
| 2014 | Soundarya Lahari | E-TV | Guest |
| 2017 | ABCD-Anybody Can Dance | Zee Telugu | Judge |
| 2017 | Kings of Comedy Juniors | Star Vijay | Judge |
| 2025-Present | Jodi Are U Ready season 2 | Star Vijay | Judge |
