= Unakkaga Ellam Unakkaga =

- Poster
- Directed by: Sundar C
- Screenplay by: Sundar C
- Story by: Suraj
- Produced by: K. Muralidharan; V. Swaminathan; G. Venugopal
- Starring: Karthik; Rambha
- Cinematography: U. K. Senthil Kumar
- Edited by: P. Sai Suresh
- Music by: Yuvan Shankar Raja
- Production company: Lakshmi Movie Makers
- Release date: 24 September 1999
- Running time: 151 minutes
- Country: India
- Language: Tamil

Unakkaga Ellam Unakkaga (transl. For you, everything for you) is a 1999 Indian Tamil-language romantic comedy film directed by Sundar C. It stars Karthik and Rambha in the lead roles with Goundamani, Vivek, Vinu Chakravarthy, Anju among others in supporting roles. The film, scored by Yuvan Shankar Raja and filmed by U. K. Senthil Kumar, was released on 24 September 1999. It was a major commercial success. The film was remade in Telugu as Maa Pelliki Randi (2001).

== Plot ==
Sakthivel "Sakthi" is the only son of a rich landlord in a village. He roams around with his uncle Kundalagesi without taking any responsibilities, which irritates his father. One day, Sakthi meets Indhu in his village, and it is love at first sight for him. He meets her on a few more instances and proposes his love. Though reluctant at first, Indhu falls for Sakthi.

Sakthi's father meets his close friend after so many years, and they decide to get their children married to each other. Sakthi gets furious hearing this and requests his father to stop the wedding plans, for which he does not agree. As Sakthi is scared of his father, he is unable to convey about his love.

Sakthi formulates a plan along with Kundalakesi and his friend Madhi. They plan to create a problem when their families meet so the wedding will be cancelled. On the day of the meeting, Sakthi and his sidekicks try so many things to disturb the gathering, but all goes in vain.

Finally Sakthi falsely accuses that the bride's family members speak ill about his family, which brings about a heated argument. In between the argument, Sakthi hits the bride's father to blow up the problem, but is shocked to see Indhu over there dressed up as the bride. Only then Sakthi realises that the bride is none other than Indhu, and feels bad that he has spoiled the event.

Indhu is angered seeing Sakthi hit her father, so she ditches him and leaves to Chennai. Sakthi's father is equally angry over his friend believing the false accusation made by Sakthi. Sakthi tries to convince his father and Indhu, but neither of them gets convinced. Sakthi comes to Chennai to meet Indhu and explain to her about the incident. Indhu, though reluctant to meet Sakthi at first, later understands his position and accepts him.

Sakthi saves Latha from committing suicide, and Inspector Kalyanaraman misunderstands them as couples. Also, Madhi is married to a rich, arrogant businesswoman Savithri. Madhi romances with a prostitute Lalitha, and when Savithri spots them together, he defends them by introducing the prostitute as Sakthi's wife. Another man mistakes Sakthi as his son-in-law.

Finally Sakthi convinces both his father and Indhu's father, and their wedding is arranged. A few hilarious events happen when everyone attends the wedding, misunderstanding Sakthi as a cheat. Everything is sorted out when the girls involved open up the truth to everyone. In the end, Sakthi unites with Indhu.

== Cast ==
- Karthik as Sakthivel (Sakthi)
- Rambha as Indhu
- Goundamani as Kundalakesi
- Vivek as Mathi
- Vinu Chakravarthy as Veeramuthu, Sakthi’s father
- Anju as Savithri
- Indhu as Priya
- Jai Ganesh as Marimuthu
- Vichithra as Lalitha
- Vinodhini as Lakshmi
- Madhan Bob as Inspector Kalyanaraman
- S. S. Chandran as Major Mahadevan
- Hemanth Ravan as Ashok
- Vaiyapuri as Gun Pandi
- Vichu Vishwanath as Ali Baba
- Sachu as Sivagami
- Balu Anand as Chinnamuthu
- Crane Manohar as Kesavan
- Kaka Radhakrishnan as Kathamuthu
- Pandu as Dr. Kurumbur Venky
- Ashwini as Gayathri
- Mumtaj (special appearance in the song "Duniya Hey Duniya")

== Soundtrack ==
The soundtrack was composed by Yuvan Shankar Raja and consists of 5 songs.

Track listing
No.	Title	Lyrics	Singer(s)	Length
1.	"Cleopatra"	Viveka	Yuvan Shankar Raja, Timmy, Sowmya Raoh	4:51
2.	"Duniya Hey Duniya"	Kalaikumar	Srinivas, Sandeep	4:39
3.	"Monalisa"	Viveka	Devan, Anuradha Sriram	4:50
4.	"Thulli Thulli"	Viveka	Sujatha, S. P. B. Charan	4:35
5.	"Vennila Veliye"	Palani Bharathi	Hariharan	5:05
Total length:				24:00

== Reception ==
K. N. Vijiyan of New Straits Times gave the film a positive review, saying the music was the only "sore" point as many of the songs were intrusive to the plot. D. S. Ramanjuan of The Hindu wrote, "CHAOTIC SITUATIONS and rip-roaring fun, a hallmark of director Sunder C. (the humour content outbeats the director's "Ullathal Alli Thaa") pervade the frames right through in Lakshmi Movie Makers', "Unakkaga Ellam Unakkaga". C. Siraj's fun-filled story and dialogue find good outlet in the screenplay of the director." Aurangazeb of Kalki questioned that while it is good to make comedy films amidst violence filled action films, how can one force someone to laugh when the laughs are hard to come. Deccan Herald wrote "If you want to simply sit back and watch, see Unakkaga Ellam Unakkaga, it`ll be easy, and I can promise you it won`t leave you wishing the film had ended differently, as you probably did with Minsara Kanna !". P. Sai Suresh won the Tamil Nadu State Film Award for Best Editor.
