= Mettukudi =

- Poster
- Directed by: Sundar C
- Written by: Sundar C
- Dialogue by: K. Selva Bharathy
- Produced by: N. Prabhavathy; N. Jyothi Lakshmi; N. Vishnuram; N. Raghuram
- Starring: Karthik; Nagma
- Cinematography: U. K. Senthil Kumar
- Edited by: P. Sai Suresh
- Music by: Sirpy
- Production company: Ganga Gowri Productions
- Release date: 29 August 1996
- Running time: 135 minutes
- Country: India
- Language: Tamil

Mettukudi (/meɪttukudi/ transl. The House on the Hill) is a 1996 Indian Tamil-language comedy film directed by Sundar C, who also wrote the screenplay. The film stars Karthik and Nagma, with Goundamani, Manivannan and Gemini Ganesan in supporting roles. The music was composed by Sirpy with cinematography by U. K. Senthil Kumar and editing by P. Sai Suresh. The film was released on 29 August 1996. It is a remake of the 1990 Malayalam film His Highness Abdullah.

== Plot ==
The story starts in the 9th century. King Raja Raja Chola presents his valuable sword to his commander-in-chief, for playing a vital role in winning a war. It is preserved by his family's descendants. In the present, an archaeologist plans to steal the sword due to its monetary value. Presently, a landlord Shanmugam is charged with the care of the sword.

The archaeologist plans to send Raja to steal the sword. He enters into the palace as the son (who ran off from the family in his childhood) of Kumarasamy, Shanmugam's son-in-law. Initially, everything goes smoothly. However, Indhu, Shanmugam's granddaughter, falls in love with Raja. The situation called for Raja to marry her. Later, Indhu discovers the truth and confronts him about stealing the sword.

In the meantime, Shanmugam, not knowing Raja for what he came there for, gives the sword to him and asks him to look after it. This makes Raja realise his mistake and promises him to protect it. The climax occurs when Raja manages to protect the sword from the archaeologist, and the family accepts Raja after learning the truth.

== Cast ==
- Karthik as Rajasekhar
- Nagma as Indhu
- Goundamani as Kalingarayan
- Manivannan as Kumarasamy
- Thilakan as Deivathinam
- Rajeev as the archaeologist
- Kazan Khan as Deivathinam's son
- Uday Prakash as Deivathinam's son
- Viswanathan
- Halwa Vasu as Servant
- Kavitha as Shanmugam's daughter
- Kalaranjini as Sivagaami
- Rajeena
- Vellai Subbaiah
- Gemini Ganesan as Shanmugam

== Production ==
The film was predominantly shot at Lalitha Mahal, Mysore. Thilakan was the director's only choice for the role he played.

== Soundtrack ==
The soundtrack was composed by Sirpy and lyrics were written by Palani Bharathi.

Track listing
No.	Title	Singers	Length
1.	"Anbulla Mannavane"	Mano, Swarnalatha	5:15
2.	"Velvetta Velvetta"	Mano, K. S. Chithra	4:59
3.	"Indha Poonthendral"	Mano, Sirpy, Israth	4:59
4.	"Adi Yaaradhu Yaaradhu"	Mano, K. S. Chithra	5:00
5.	"Mana Madurai Gundu Malliye"	Krishnachander, Swarnalatha	4:55
6.	"Saravanabava"	Mano	4:48
Total length:			29:56

== Reception ==
R. P. R. of Kalki praised the performances of Gemini Ganesan and Thilakan but panned the editing for having kept the scenes lengthy and found the stuff revolving around sword unbelievable.
