= Aranmanai (film series) =

Indian comedy horror film series

- Series logo
- Directed by: Sundar C
- Written by: Venkat Raghavan (1, 2); Sundar C (3, 4)
- Screenplay by: Sundar C; S.B.Ramadoss; Venkat Raghavan
- Story by: Sundar C
- Produced by: D. Dinesh Karthik (1); Khushbu Sundar (2, 3, 4); A. C. Shanmugam (3); A. C. S. Arunkumar (3, 4)
- Starring: see below
- Cinematography: U. K. Senthil Kumar (1, 2, 3); E. Krishnasamy (4)
- Edited by: Srikanth.N.B (1, 2); Fenny Oliver (3, 4)
- Music by: Bharadwaj, Karthik Raja (1); Hiphop Tamizha (2, 4); C. Sathya (3)
- Production companies: Vision i Medias (1); Avni Cinemax (2, 3, 4)
- Distributed by: Red Giant Movies (1, 3); Sri Thenandal Films (1, 2)
- Release dates: 19 September 2014 (1); 29 January 2016 (2); 14 October 2021 (3); 3 May 2024 (4)
- Running time: 599 minutes (1–4 films)
- Country: India
- Language: Tamil

Aranmanai (transl. Palace) is an Indian Tamil-language comedy horror film series created and directed by Sundar C, consisting of Aranmanai (2014), Aranmanai 2 (2016), Aranmanai 3 (2021) and Aranmanai 4 (2024). All films were successful at the box office, continuing the trend of the comedy horror genre in Tamil cinema that began with Chandramukhi (2005), and currently eighth highest grossing Tamil film franchise.

== Overview ==
The films are not connected with each other. Each film typically revolves around a family at a palace that is haunted by supernatural activity.

== Films ==
Film	Cast	Runtime	Released
Aranmanai	Sundar C, Hansika Motwani, Vinay Rai, Andrea Jeremiah, Raai Laxmi	161 minutes	19 September 2014
Aranmanai 2	Sundar C, Hansika Motwani, Siddharth, Trisha Krishnan	136 minutes	29 January 2016
Aranmanai 3	Sundar C, Raashii Khanna, Arya, Andrea Jeremiah, Sakshi Agarwal	156 minutes	14 October 2021
Aranmanai 4	Sundar C, Tamannaah Bhatia, Raashii Khanna	147 minutes / 150 minutes	3 May 2024

- Aranmanai (2014): A family returns to their hometown to sell their ancestral palace. However, their arrival is marred by supernatural events, and Ravi, a relative of the family, decides to uncover the truth.
- Aranmanai 2 (2016): Murali returns to his ancestral home along with his fiancée when his father lands in a coma under mysterious circumstances. His life takes a turn when he uncovers his family's dark secrets.
- Aranmanai 3 (2021): Jyothi is haunted by an unknown spirit in her childhood. Years later, when the spirit starts haunting someone close to her, she decides to unearth the spirit's connection with her family.
- Aranmanai 4 (2024): A lawyer tries to discover the truth of his sister's mysterious death, soon he gets caught into the trap of a dangerous demon called Baak.

== Cast ==
=== Aranmanai ===
- Sundar C as Adv. Ravi
- Vinay as Murali, Madhavi's husband and Selvi's former lover in the past.
- Santhanam as Paalsamy, a thief who enters the palace as a cook
- Hansika Motwani as Selvi, a village girl and Murali's former lover in the past who get killed by Ayyanar. (Voice dubbed by Savitha Reddy)
- Andrea Jeremiah as Madhavi, Ravi's sister and Murali's wife who get possessed by Selvi's spirit
- Raai Laxmi as Maya, Sivaraman's daughter and Ravi's love interest (Voice dubbed by Renuka Kathir)
- Kovai Sarala as Eshwari
- Manobala as Kesavan, Eshwari's husband
- Nithin Sathya as Mulian Kannan, Eshwari's and Kesavan's son
- Meera Krishnan as Lakshmi, Murali's mother
- Chitra Lakshmanan as Sivaraman
- Saravanan as Ayyanar
- Baby Priya as Meena
- Ganeshkar as Nallamuthu
- Swaminathan as Nachimithu
- Akila as Ramya, Selvi's unblood sister
- Yogi Babu as Sagidi, a fortune teller
- Santhana Bharathi as Chairman Paramasivam
- Kadhal Dhandapani as Rangan
- Vichu Vishwanath as Samikannu
- Gowtham Sundararajan as Inspector Ramkumar

Cameo appearances

- Manikka Vinayagam as a devotional singer in "Unnaye Enniye"
- Sirkazhi G. Sivachidambaram as a devotional singer in "Unnaye Enniye"
- Sivasankar as a devotional singer in "Unnaye Enniye"
- Aarthi Ganeshkar as Aarthi

=== Aranmanai 2 ===
- Sundar C as Ravi, Anitha's brother
- Trisha Krishnan as Anitha, Murali's fiancée, Ravi's younger sister (Voice dubbed by Krithika Nelson)
- Hansika Motwani as Maya, Arun's wife, Murali's younger sister (Voice dubbed by Renuka Kathir)
- Siddharth as Murali, younger brother of Ramesh
- Poonam Bajwa as Manju, a nurse, Ravi's love interest
- Soori as Devadas and Sandhu Bondhu Naadimuthu, Devadas's father
- Kovai Sarala as Komalam, Sandhu Bondhu Naadimuthu's ex-lover, a servant
- Manobala as Vera Shekar, Komalam's brother, a servant
- Vinodhini Vaidyanathan as Sandhya, Ramesh's wife
- Nithin Manivannan as Suresh, Ramesh's son
- Radha Ravi as Maya's father
- Subbu Panchu as Ramesh, Murali's eldest brother
- Raj Kapoor as a driver
- Chitra Lakshmanan as Ravi's father
- V. I. S. Jayapalan as Namboothiri, Manju's uncle
- Dhindukal Saravanan as Devadas's assistant
- Thalapathy Dinesh as Namboothiri's assistant
- Vichu Vishwanath as Ramakrishnan
- Rahul Thatha as a priest

Cameo appearances

- Vaibhav as Arun, Maya's husband
- Khushbu Sundar in the song "Amma"
- Hiphop Tamizha in the song "Party with the Pei"

=== Aranmanai 3 ===
- Arya as Saravanan, an electrician, Jyothi's love interest (possessed)
- Raashii Khanna as Jyothi, Saravanan's love interest, believed to be the daughter of Rajasekhar and Eeshwari (Voice dubbed by Smruthi K)
  - Veronika Arora as Young Jyothi
- Sundar C as Ravi, Hema's husband, Shalu's father
- Andrea Jeremiah as Eeshwari "Raani", Rajasekhar's late wife, Samikannu's love interest
- Sakshi Agarwal as Hema, Ravi's wife, Shalu's mother, Sarala's daughter (Voice dubbed by Priya Anand)
- Vivek as Sigamani, a failed politician, Mynavathi's husband and Rajasekhar's brother-in-law
- Yogi Babu as Abhishek, a thief, Saravanan's friend
- Myna Nandhini as Mynavathi, Sigamani's wife, Sarala and Rajasekhar's sister
- Sampath Raj as Rajasekhar, a Zamindar, Sarala's younger brother & Mynavathi's elder brother, Jyothi's adopted father and Eeshwari's husband
- Nalini as Sarala, Rajasekhar and Mynavathi's elder sister, Hema's mother, Ravi's mother-in-law, Shalu's grandmother (Voice dubbed by Nithya Ravindar)
- Cell Murugan as Manickam, Money lender's assistant
- Manobala as Pencil, a thief, Abhishek's assistant
- Vela Ramamoorthy as Saamiyaadi, and Samikannu's father
- Ovi Bhandarkar as Shalu, Sarala's granddaughter, Ravi and Hema's daughter
- Amit Bhargav as Samikannu, Eeshwari's lover, Saamiyaadi's son
- Vincent Ashokan as Durai, a driver, Jyothi’s biological father
- Vichu Vishwanath as Kaali, a gardener
- Kulappulli Leela as Valliamma, a cook
- Madhusudan Rao as Vallimalai Swamiji
- TSR Srinivasan as the temple priest
- Sri Ganesh as IAS Collector

Cameo appearances in the song "Theeyaga Thondri"

- Hariharan as a devotional singer
- Shankar Mahadevan as a devotional singer
- C. Sathya

=== Aranmanai 4 ===
- Sundar C as Lawyer Saravanan
- Tamannaah as Selvi, Saravanan's younger sister (Voice dubbed by M. M. Manasi)
- Raashii Khanna as Dr. Maaya, Zamindar's granddaughter (Voice dubbed by Smruthi K)
- Santhosh Prathap as Santhosh, Selvi's husband
- Ramachandra Raju as the swami
- Kovai Sarala as Saravanan's aunt
- Yogi Babu as a mason
- VTV Ganesh as the carpenter
- Delhi Ganesh as the zamindar, Maaya's grandfather
- Jayaprakash as Varatha Rajan SV, village president
- Fredrick Jhonson as Ravi, Varatha Rajan's son
- Rajendran as Rathnam
- Singampuli as Constable A. Shakthivel
- Deva Nandha as Shakthi, Selvi's daughter
- Sanjay as Saravanan, Selvi's son
- Lollu Sabha Seshu as the zamindar's servant
- Vichu Vishwanath as the money lender
- Yatin Karyekar as the priest
- Namo Narayana as K. Duraipandi
- Jayashri Chaki as Selvi, Duraipandi's daughter
- Harsha Harish as the priest’s daughter

Telugu version

- Vennela Kishore as a mason
- Srinivasa Reddy as a carpenter

Cameo appearance

- K. S. Ravikumar as DSP S. Jagadheesan
- Khushbu Sundar in the song "Amman"
- Simran in the song "Amman"

== Character identification ==
Character(s)	Film(s)			
Character(s)	Aranmanai (2014)	Aranmanai2 (2016)	Aranmanai3 (2021)	Aranmanai 4 (2024)
Recurring lead	Sundar C	Sundar C	Sundar C	Sundar C
Recurring lead's lover	Raai Laxmi	Poonam Bajwa	Sakshi Agarwal	Raashii Khanna
Male lead	Vinay Rai	Siddharth	Arya	Sundar C
Female lead	Andrea Jeremiah	Trisha Krishnan	Raashii Khanna	Raashii Khanna
Spirit	Hansika Motwani	Hansika Motwani	Andrea Jeremiah	Tamannaah Bhatia
Spirit's lover	Vinay Rai	Vaibhav Reddy	Amit Bhargav	Santhosh Prathap
Spirit possessed	Andrea Jeremiah	Trisha Krishnan, Sundar C	Arya	—
Villain(s)	Saravanan	Radha Ravi, Subbu Panchu	Sampath Raj, Vincent Asokan	Ramachandra Raju (Duplicate)
Comedian(s)	Santhanam, Kovai Sarala, Manobala	Soori, Manobala, Kovai Sarala	Manobala, Nalini, Yogi Babu, Vivek, Myna Nandhini	Kovai Sarala, Yogi Babu, VTV Ganesh, Singampuli The partially reshot Telugu version Baak features Vennela Kishore and Srinivasa Reddy.
Child Artist(s)	Priya	Nithin Manivannan	Veronika Arora, Ovi Bhandarkar	Deva Nandha, Sanjay
Cameo appearances	K. Sivasankar, Sirkazhi G. Sivachidambaram, Manikka Vinayagam	Khushbu Sundar, Hiphop Tamizha	Hariharan, Shankar Mahadevan, C. Sathya	Khusbhu Sundar, Simran

== Creative and technical crew ==
Occupation	Film			
Occupation	Aranmanai (2014)	Aranmanai 2 (2016)	Aranmanai 3 (2021)	Aranmanai 4 (2024)
Director	Sundar C	Sundar C	Sundar C	Sundar C
Producer	D. Dinesh Karthick	Khushbu Sundar	Khushbu Sundar, Sundar C, A. C. S. Arunkumar, A. C. Shanmugam	Khushbu Sundar, Sundar C, A. C. Shanmugam, A. C. S. Arunkumar
Screenplay	Sundar C, S. B. Ramadoss	Sundar C, S. B. Ramadoss	Sundar C, Venkat Raghavan	Sundar C, Venkat Raghavan
Writer	Venkat Raghavan	Venkat Raghavan, Sundar C	Sundar C, Venkat Raghavan, S. B. Ramadass	Sundar C, Venkat Raghavan, S. B. Ramadass
Cinematography	U. K. Senthil Kumar	U. K. Senthil Kumar	U. K. Senthil Kumar	E. Krishnasamy
Editor	N. B. Srikanth	N. B. Srikanth	Fenny Oliver	Fenny Oliver
Composer	Bharadwaj, Karthik Raja (score)	Hiphop Tamizha	C. Sathya	Hiphop Tamizha
Distributors	Red Giant Movies	Sri Thenandal Films	Red Giant Movies	
Production company	Vision i Medias	Avni Cinemax	Avni Cinemax, Benzz Media (P) Ltd.	Avni Cinemax, Benzz Media (P) Ltd.

== Music ==
=== Aranmanai ===
Track listing
No.	Title	Lyrics	Singer(s)	Length
1.	"Katthi Parvakkaari"	Annamalai	Karthik, Surmukhi Raman	4:34
2.	"Peeche Peeche"	Pa. Vijay	M. M. Manasi, Surmukhi Raman, Monisha	4:24
3.	"Petromax Light"	Pa. Vijay	Velmurugan, Hariharasudhan	4:52
4.	"Sonnathu Sonnathu"	Pa. Vijay	Harini, Sadhana Sargam	4:58
5.	"Unnaye Enniye"	Piraisoodan	Ananthu, Mukesh Mohamed, M. L. R. Karthikeyan	6:00
Total length:				24:48

=== Aranmanai 2 ===
Track listing
No.	Title	Lyrics	Singer(s)	Length
1.	"Party With The Pei"	Hiphop Tamizha	Hiphop Tamizha, Kharesma Ravichandran	3:35
2.	"Maayaa Maayaa"	Vivek	Kailash Kher, Padmalatha	4:20
3.	"Poraadaa Poraadaa"	Hiphop Tamizha	Hiphop Tamizha	3:38
4.	"Kuchi Mittai"	Hiphop Tamizha	Anthony Daasan	4:12
5.	"Amma" (the Amman song)	Piraisoodan	Malathi Lakshman, Hiphop Tamizha, Vishnupriya Ravi, Anthony Daasan	4:40
6.	"Aranmanai 2" (instrumental)		Hiphop Tamizha	2:31
Total length:				22:56

=== Aranmanai 3 ===
Track listing
No.	Title	Lyrics	Singer(s)	Length
1.	"Ratatapata"	Arivu	Arivu, Ranina Reddy	3:24
2.	"Rasavaachiye"	Mohan Rajan	Sid Sriram	3:24
3.	"Lojakku Mojakku"	Mohan Rajan	Mukesh Mohamed	3:38
4.	"Sengaandhale"	Pa. Vijay	Reema	4:59
5.	"Theeyaga Thondri"	Nattu Raja Durai	Shankar Mahadevan, Hariharan	4:47
Total length:				20:11

=== Aranmanai 4 ===
Tamil
No.	Title	Lyrics	Singer(s)	Length
1.	"Achacho"	Vignesh Srikanth	Kharesma Ravichandran, Srinisha Jayaseelan	3:13
2.	"Jo Jo"	Ko Sesha	Meenakshi Ilayaraja	3:26
3.	"Amman"	Muthamil	Aruna Ravindran, V. M. Mahalingam	4:41
4.	"Oyile Oyile"	Ko Sesha	Kaushik Krish, Snigdha Chandra	2:38
5.	"Ghost Theme"		Hiphop Tamizha	2:35
Total length:				16:33

Telugu
No.	Title	Lyrics	Singer(s)	Length
1.	"Panchuko"	Raghavi	Sahithi	3:09
2.	"Jo Jo"	Bharathi Babu	Saindhavi	3:24
3.	"Amma"	Sahithi	Kavitha Gopi, Deepak Blue	4:39
4.	"Ghost Theme"		Hiphop Tamizha	2:35
Total length:				13:47

== Home media ==
Films	Satellite Rights	Digital Rights	Ref.
Aranmanai	Sun TV	Sun NXT	
Aranmanai 2	Sun TV	Sun NXT	
Aranmanai 3	Kalaignar TV	ZEE5	
Aranmanai 4	Star Vijay	JioHotstar	

== Other releases ==
Original release	Telugu release	Hindi release	Ref.
Aranmanai	Chandrakala	Rajmahal	
19 September 2014	19 December 2014	5 September 2014	
Aranmanai 2	Kalavathi	Rajmahal 2	
29 January 2016
Aranmanai 3	Anthahpuram	Aranmanai 3	
14 October 2021
Aranmanai 4	Baak	Aranmanai 4	
3 May 2024		31 May 2024	

== Box office ==
Films	Budget	Box office	Ref.
Aranmanai	₹12 crore	₹30 crore	
Aranmanai 2	₹27 Crore	₹42 crore (Note: Final figure not available)	
Aranmanai 3	₹22 crore	₹50 crore	
Aranmanai 4	₹40 crore	₹101 crore	
