= List of highest-grossing Tamil films =

Tamil cinema is a part of Indian cinema based in Chennai, Tamil Nadu. The films are made primarily in the Tamil language. Chintamani (1937) and Haridas (1944) are landmark films from the early stages of Tamil cinema. Chintamani was the first major box office success, while Haridas is noted for its significant impact and long theatrical run, reflecting the industry's development before its formal establishment post-independence. This ranking lists the highest-grossing Tamil films produced by Tamil cinema, based on conservative global box office estimates as reported by organizations classified as green by Wikipedia. (Note: See WP:RSP, WP:ICTFSOURCES) The figures are not adjusted for inflation. However, there is no official tracking of figures, and sources publishing data are frequently pressured to increase their estimates.

== Key ==
Background shading indicates that a film, or at least one from a series, is currently showing in theatres worldwide.

== Highest-grossing films ==
The top grossing films worldwide with a minimum of ₹200 crore are listed here.

Rank	Title	Worldwide gross	Year	Ref.
1	Jailer 2	₹835 crore	2026	
2	2.0	₹699–800 crore	2018	(Note: 2.0 becomes the third Tamil film to cross ₹500 crores, after Baahubali: The Beginning and its sequel Baahubali 2: The Conclusion (Box Office India) – ₹800 crore (India Today))
3	Jailer	₹605–650 crore	2023	(Note: Jailer's reported worldwide grosses vary between ₹605 crore (India Today) – ₹650 crore (Firstpost, Cinema Express))
4	Leo	₹589–615 crore	2023	(Note: Leo's reported worldwide grosses vary between ₹589.11 crore (Box Office India) – ₹595 crore (Box Office India) – ₹615 crore (Deccan Chronicle))
5	Coolie	₹514–675 crore	2025	(Note: Coolie's reported worldwide grosses vary between ₹514 crore (The Hans India; Filmfare; Network18 Group) – ₹515 crore (OTTPlay) – ₹675 crore (The Indian Express; Zee News))
6	Ponniyin Selvan: I	₹500 crore	2022	(Note: Ponniyin Selvan: I's reported worldwide gross is ₹500 crore according to Hindustan Times, Outlook India, News18, and The Economic Times.)
7	The Greatest of All Time	₹440–460 crore	2024	(Note: GOAT's reported worldwide grosses vary between ₹440 crore (Box Office India; The Hans India) – ₹452 crore (The Economic Times; NDTV) – ₹460 crore (Filmfare))
8	Vikram	₹424–500 crore	2022	(Note: Vikram's reported worldwide grosses vary between ₹424 crore (Deccan Herald) – ₹435 crore (Bollywood Hungama) – ₹500 crore (Hindustan Times))
9	Ponniyin Selvan: II	₹342–346 crore	2023	(Note: Ponniyin Selvan: II's reported worldwide grosses vary between ₹342 crore (Cinema Express) – ₹345 crore (News18) – ₹346 crore (DNA India))
10	Amaran	₹320–335 crore	2024	(Note: Amaran's reported worldwide grosses vary between ₹320 crore (India Today, Hindustan Times, Mint, and News18) – ₹335 crore (The Hans India))
11	Kabali	₹320 crore	2016	
12	Jana Nayagan	₹311–325 crore	2026	(Note: Jana Nayagan's reported worldwide grosses vary between ₹311.66 crore (Box Office India) – ₹320 crore (DNA India) – ₹320.34 crore (Deccan Chronicle) – ₹322.80 crore (The Telegraph) – ₹325 crore (News18 Malayalam))
13	Karuppu	₹296.44–363 crore	2026	(Note: Karuppu's reported worldwide grosses vary between ₹296.44 crore (Box Office India) – ₹310 crore (The Telegraph, Hindustan Times) – ₹315 crore (Moneycontrol) – ₹363 crore (Forbes India).)
14	Varisu	₹290–293 crore	2023	(Note: The New Indian Express stated that Varisu grossed ₹290 crore worldwide. Box Office India stated that the film grossed ₹293 crore worldwide in its lifetime.)
15	Bigil	₹285–300 crore	2019	(Note: Bigil's reported worldwide grosses vary between ₹285 crore (Firstpost) – ₹300 crore (Business Today and News18 India))
16	Enthiran	₹283–320 crore	2010	(Note: Enthiran's reported worldwide grosses vary between ₹283 crore (Hindustan Times) – ₹290 crore (India Today) – ₹300 crore (The New Indian Express) – ₹320 crore (Box Office India))
17	Scene	₹256.50 crore	2026	
18	Sarkar	₹253 crore	2018	(Note: Sarkar's reported worldwide gross is ₹253 crore according to India Today and The Indian Express.)
19	Vettaiyan	₹250–253 crore	2024	(Note: Vettaiyan's reported worldwide grosses vary between ₹250 crore (Hindustan Times, The Economic Times) – ₹253 crore (Filmfare))
20	Mersal	₹250 crore	2017	(Note: Mersal's reported worldwide gross is ₹250 crore according to India Today, Deccan Chronicle, and The News Minute.)
21	Darbar	₹250 crore	2020	
22	Annatthe	₹240 crore	2021	
23	I	₹239–240 crore	2015	(Note: I's reported worldwide gross varies between ₹239 crore (NDTV, Hindustan Times) – ₹240 crore (Forbes))
24	Master	₹220–300 crore	2021	(Note: Master's reported worldwide grosses vary between ₹220 crore (The Indian Express) – 230 crore (Box Office India) – ₹250 crore (India Today) – ₹300 crore (The News Minute))
25	Petta	₹220–240 crore	2019	(Note: Petta's reported worldwide grosses vary between ₹220 crore (Business Today) – ₹240 (Hindustan Times))
26	Vishwaroopam (Note: The film was produced in both the Tamil and Hindi languages, according to the filmmakers.)	₹220 crore	2013	
27	Beast	₹216–300 crore	2022	(Note: Beast's reported worldwide grosses vary between ₹216 crore (CNBC TV18) – ₹240 crore (The Indian Express) – ₹300 crore (India Today and Puthiya Thalaimurai)
28	Vishwanath & Sons	₹200–260 crore	2026	(Note: Vishwanath & Sons's reported worldwide grosses vary between ₹200 crore (Hindustan Times, The Week) – ₹205.50 crore (DNA India) – ₹260 crore (Outlook India, Cinema Express))
29	Good Bad Ugly	₹200–248.25 crore	2025	(Note: Good Bad Ugly's reported worldwide grosses vary between ₹200 crore (Filmfare) – ₹240 crore (Deccan Chronicle – ₹248.25 crore (The Economic Times, Hindustan Times))
30	Dasavathaaram	₹200 crore	2008	

== Highest-grossing films by market ==
=== India ===
Rank	Title	Total gross	Year	Ref.
1	Jailer 2	₹552.14 crore	2026	
2	2.0	₹519.65 crore	2018	
3	Leo	₹417 crore	2023	
4	Jailer	₹407 crore	2023	
5	Coolie	₹323 crore	2025	
6	Ponniyin Selvan: I	₹327.45 crore	2022	
7	The Greatest of All Time	₹305 crore	2024	
8	Vikram	₹302.50 crore	2022	
9	Amaran	₹258 crore	2024	
10	Karuppu	₹240 crore	2026	

==== Tamil Nadu ====
Rank	Title	Total gross	Year	Ref.
1	Leo	₹231 crore	2023	
2	Ponniyin Selvan: I	₹222 crore	2022	
3	The Greatest of All Time	₹220 crore	2024	
4	Jailer 2	₹218 crore	2026	
5	Jailer	₹189 crore	2023	
6	Vikram	₹181 crore	2022	
7	Karuppu	₹165 crore	2026	(Note: Karuppu's reported worldwide grosses vary between ₹310 crore (The Telegraph, Hindustan Times) – ₹315 crore (Moneycontrol))
8	Amaran	₹161 crore	2024	
9	Good Bad Ugly	₹146 crore	2025	
10	Master	₹145.5 crore	2021	

==== Andhra Pradesh and Telangana ====
Rank	Title	Total gross	Year	Ref.
1	Jailer 2	₹97 crore	2026	
2	2.0	₹94 crore	2018	
3	Jailer	₹84 crore	2023	
4	Coolie	₹68.50 crore	2025	
5	Enthiran	₹64 crore	2010	
6	Vishwanath & Sons	₹54 crore	2026	
7	I	₹51 crore	2015	
8	Amaran	₹50.75 crore	2024	
9	Leo	₹48 crore	2023	
10	Vikram	₹36.75 crore	2022	

==== Karnataka ====
Rank	Title	Total gross	Year	Ref.
1	Jailer 2	₹95 crore	2026	
2	Jailer	₹63 crore	2023	
3	2.0	₹51 crore	2018	
4	Coolie	₹45 crore	2025	
5	Leo	₹41 crore	2023	
6	The Greatest of All Time	₹27.95 crore	2024	
7	Ponniyin Selvan: I	₹27.20 crore	2022	
8	Amaran	₹25.60 crore	2024	
9	Vikram	₹24 crore	2022	
10	Karuppu	₹23.50 crore	2026	

==== Kerala ====
Rank	Title	Total gross	Year	Ref.
1	Jailer 2	₹80 crore	2026	
2	Leo	₹60 crore	2023	
3	Jailer	₹57.75 crore	2023	
4	Vikram	₹38 crore	2022	
5	Scene	₹28.65 crore	2026	
6	Coolie	₹25 crore	2025	
7	Ponniyin Selvan: I	₹24.30 crore	2022	
8	2.0	₹22.40 crore	2018	
9	Mersal	₹20 crore	2017	
10	DC	₹19.75 crore	2026	

=== North America (USA & Canada) ===
Rank	Title	Gross (US$)	Year	Ref.
1	Jailer 2	$7.8 million	2026	
2	Jailer	$7.25 million	2023	
3	Coolie	$6.95 million	2025	
4	Ponniyin Selvan: I	$6.7 million	2022	
5	Leo	$5.69 million	2023	
6	2.0	$5.5 million	2018	
7	Ponniyin Selvan: II	$5.27 million	2023	
8	Kabali	$4.58 million	2016	
9	The Greatest of All Time	$4.37 million	2024	
10	Enthiran	$3.12 million	2010	

== Highest-grossing films by opening day ==
Rank	Title	Worldwide gross	Year	Ref.
1	Coolie	₹151 crore	2025	
2	Leo	₹140–148.50 crore	2023	(Note: Leo's reported opening day worldwide grosses vary between ₹140 crore – ₹148.50 crore (Livemint))
3	Jailer 2	₹125.25 crore	2026	
4	The Greatest of All Time	₹100.5 crore	2024	
5	2.0	₹100 crore	2018	
6	Kabali	₹87.5 crore	2016	
7	Jailer	₹70–87 crore	2023	(Note: Jailer's reported opening day worldwide grosses vary between ₹70 crore (Hindu Tamil Thisai,) – ₹87 crore (Pinkvilla))
8	Ponniyin Selvan: I	₹78.29 core	2022	
9	Jana Nayagan	₹78 crore	2026	
10	Beast	₹72.67 crore	2022	

== Highest-grossing films by month ==
Month	Title	Worldwide gross	Year	Ref.
January	Varisu	₹290–293 crore	2023	(Note: Varisu's reported worldwide grosses vary between ₹290 crore (The New Indian Express) – ₹293 crore (Box Office India))
February	Vishwaroopam	₹220 crore	2013	
March	Etharkkum Thunindhavan	₹71.40–200 crore	2022	
April	Ponniyin Selvan: II	₹342–346 crore	2023	
May	Karuppu	₹296.44–363 crore	2026	
June	Vikram	₹435–500 crore	2022	
July	Raayan	₹160 crore	2024	
August	Jailer	₹605–650 crore	2023	
September	Ponniyin Selvan: I	₹500 crore	2022	
October	Jailer 2	₹835 crore	2026	
November	2.0	₹666–800 crore	2018	
December	Lingaa	₹158 crore	2014	

== Highest-grossing films by year ==
Year	Title	Worldwide gross	Ref.
2010	Enthiran	₹290–305 crore	
2011	7 Aum Arivu	₹105 crore	
2012	Thuppakki	₹121 crore	
2013	Vishwaroopam	₹220 crore	
2014	Lingaa	₹158 crore	
2015	I	₹239 crore	
2016	Kabali	₹305 crore	
2017	Mersal	₹220 crore	
2018	2.0	₹700–800 crore	
2019	Bigil	₹285–300 crore	
2020	Darbar	₹250 crore	
2021	Master	₹220–300 crore	(Note: Master's reported worldwide grosses vary between ₹220 crore (The Indian Express) – 230 crore (Box Office India) – ₹250 crore (India Today) – ₹300 crore (The News Minute))
2022	Ponniyin Selvan: I	₹500 crore	
2023	Jailer	₹605–650 crore	
2024	The Greatest of All Time	₹440–460 crore	
2025	Coolie	₹514–675 crore	
2026	Jailer 2	₹835 crore	

== Highest-grossing franchises ==
Highest-grossing franchises

Rank	Franchise	Worldwide gross (crore) (Note: The franchise gross is calculated using the lowest reported gross for each film in the franchise.)	No. of films	Average gross (crore)	Highest grosser

1	Jailer	₹1,440	2	₹720	Jailer 2 (₹835 crore)
1	Jailer 2 (2026)	₹835			
2	Jailer (2023)	₹605			

2	Lokesh Cinematic Universe	₹1,135	3	₹378	Leo (₹595–615 crore)
1	Leo (2023) (Note: Leo's reported worldwide grosses vary between ₹595 crore (Box Office India) – ₹615 crore (Deccan Chronicle).)	₹595			
2	Vikram (2022)	₹435			
3	Kaithi (2019)	₹105			

3	Enthiran	₹1,000	2	₹500	2.0 (film) (₹700–800 crore)
1	2.0 (film) (2018)	₹700			
2	Enthiran (2010)	₹300			

4	Ponniyin Selvan	₹842	2	₹421	Ponniyin Selvan: I (₹500 crore)
1	Ponniyin Selvan: I (2022)	₹500			
2	Ponniyin Selvan: II (2023)	₹342			

5	Singam	₹336	3	₹112	Singam II (₹136)
1	Singam II (2013)	₹136			
2	Si3 (2017)	₹110			
3	Singam (2010)	₹90			

6	Kanchana	₹305	4	₹76	Kanchana 3 (₹130 crore)
1	Kanchana 3 (2019)	₹130			
2	Kanchana (2011)	₹60			
3	Kanchana 2 (2015)	₹105			
4	Muni (2007) (Note: Gross figure unavailable)	₹10			

7	Vishwaroopam	₹270	2	₹135	Vishwaroopam (₹220)
1	Vishwaroopam (2013)	₹220			
2	Vishwaroopam II (2018)	₹50			

8	Indian	₹216	2	₹108	Indian 2 (₹151)
1	Indian 2 (2024)	₹151			
2	Indian (1996)	₹65			

9	Aranmanai	₹236.58	4	₹59	Aranmanai 4 (₹100.5)
1	Aranmanai 4 (2024)	₹100.5			
2	Aranmanai (2014)	₹65			
3	Aranmanai 3 (2021)	₹55			
4	Aranmanai 2 (2016)	₹16.08			

10	Velaiilla Pattadhari	₹96	2	₹48	Velaiilla Pattadhari (₹53)
1	Velaiilla Pattadhari (2014)	₹53			
2	Velaiilla Pattadhari 2 (2017)	₹43			

== See also ==
- List of highest-grossing Indian films
  - List of highest-grossing Hindi films
  - List of highest-grossing Indian Bengali films
  - List of highest-grossing Marathi films
  - List of highest-grossing Punjabi-language films
  - List of highest-grossing South Indian films
    - List of highest-grossing Kannada films
    - List of highest-grossing Malayalam films
    - List of highest-grossing Telugu films
- List of highest-grossing films in India
