= Aayiram Jenmangal =

1978 film

- Poster
- Directed by: Durai
- Screenplay by: Mathioli Shanmugam
- Story by: S. L. Puram Sadanandan
- Produced by: M. Muthuraman
- Starring: Latha; Vijayakumar; Rajinikanth; Padmapriya
- Cinematography: V. Ranga
- Edited by: R. Devarajan
- Music by: M. S. Viswanathan
- Production company: Pallavi Enterprises
- Release date: 10 March 1978
- Running time: 119 minutes
- Country: India
- Language: Tamil

Aayiram Jenmangal (transl. A Thousand Births) is a 1978 Indian Tamil-language horror film directed by Durai. Latha, Vijayakumar, Rajinikanth and Padmapriya appear in the lead roles. It is a remake of the 1976 Malayalam film Yakshagaanam. The film was released on 10 March 1978. It was loosely remade in 2014 as the Tamil film Aranmanai.

== Plot ==
Ravi is happily married to Savitri. Savitri's brother Ramesh (Rajinikanth) has come from Singapore, and they all go to Ravi's estate for a vacation. That night starts Savitri's terrible ordeal. An apparition becomes visible only to her, along with an eerie song and the sound of anklets that only she can hear. Before she realises what is happening, another spirit enters her body, driving out her own spirit.

Overnight Savitri's persona itself changes; she talks, walks and behaves like a different woman. Ramesh is puzzled at the change, and keeps a watch on her. He follows her, as she wanders all over the hills with the easy familiarity of a person who has lived there all her life. He sees her shed tears over two names carved on a tree trunk; the fading legends "Radha" and "Ravi" tell the tragic tale of love and loss. He follows her as he goes to a humble cottage and eavesdrops as she introduces herself to the incredulous old woman as her dead daughter Radha. It was only due to her unrequited love that she was hovering as a banshee so far, she explains. She tells excitedly that in the 5 days before new moon, if she can have a physical union with Ravi even once, she would be alive again. And if she didn't succeed? Well, she would push Ravi down the same waterfall where she had met her end, so that they could unite in the other world.

In the old disused bungalow of Ravi, Ramesh sees a picture of a woman and listens to a cassette as well. He confronts Ravi with the photo, and Ravi tells all: how he fell in love with the woman in the picture Radha, the daughter of the late factory supervisor. They roamed all over the hills, even as the lofty knolls were passive spectators to their love. With steadfast determination, Ravi manages to get his father's acceptance. But when he rushes back with the happy tidings, he finds only her body- she had met a watery grave trying to escape from the clutches of her evil suitor Ranga. Armed with the facts now, Ramesh thwarts off the attempts of the possessed Savitri's attempts to sleep with Ravi.

The first night she dresses provocatively and sings a song of seduction in the bedroom. Ramesh knocks the door and pulls Ravi out telling him that there was a call that the factory is on fire. And the second night, he dissolves some strong sedatives in Ravi's glass of milk. The third morning, in the labour day gathering where they are special invitees, the transformed Savitri dances and sings with abandon. That night, she takes Ravi to their summer cottage, but her plan goes awry again when Ramesh sets it on fire.

On the next night, Ravi is returning home when Ranga waylays him to settle old scores and hits him on the head. Ramesh rescues him in time. Of course, that night too passes without Radha's schemes seeing success. The last night, its do or die for Radha, and so she puts the vigilant Ramesh to sleep and lures Ravi out with a soft song of invitation. Savitri's displaced spirit crying out 'Anna! Anna!’ and the barking dog wake up Ramesh and soon he is in pursuit as Radha sings and leads Ravi up the hill. In the end, good triumphs over evil.

== Cast ==
- Latha as Savithri
- Vijayakumar as Ravi
- Rajinikanth as Dr. Ramesh
- Padmapriya as Radha
- V. K. Ramasamy as Aadiyapatham
- Manorama as Annaporani
- Suruli Rajan as Azhagu
- V. Gopalakrishnan as the doctor
- V. S. Raghavan as Ravi's father
- Pushpalatha as Radha's mother
- Mathioli Shanmugam as the estate manager
- K.Kannan as Rangan Radha's uncle

== Soundtrack ==
The music was composed by M. S. Viswanathan. All the songs were written by Kannadasan.

Title	Singers	Length
"Venmegame"	S. Janaki	4:16
"Kannan Mugam Kaana"	Vani Jairam, Jayachandran	4:16
"Azhaikkindren"	S. Janaki	4:53
"Arupathu Nangu Kalaigal"	L. R. Eswari	4:19
"Naan Adatha Attamillai"	P. Susheela	4:19
"Venmegame" Bit song	S. Janaki	1:07

== Reception ==
In 1981, the Sri Lankan journal Tribune stated, "Rather spoofy and crispy, this film directed by Durai, cashes in on the popularity of [Rajinikanth] of Thee fame who at his best, is a mere passenger in the story proper."

== Lawsuits ==
The producer of this film, M. Muthuraman, approached City Civil court in Chennai claiming the 2014 film Aranmanai to be a remake of Aayiram Jenmangal. The court appointed an Advocate Commissioner to verify the claims. Advocate Commissioner on viewing both the films had stated that the plot, theme, storyline and structure were similar in both films. She also held that the script of both films was the same and most scenes were copied and replayed from Aayiram Jenmangal. The report also stated that the viewer of Aranmanai would definitely get the impression that it is a remake of Aayiram Jenmangal since they had considerable similarities. Later, the court instructed both parties to reach an out-of-court settlement.

Later when Muthuraman signed a memorandum of understanding with Sundar C to adapt Aayiram Jenmangal as Aranmanai 2 (2016), Hemant Kumar, son of Aayiram Jenmangal screenwriter Mathioli P. Shanmugam, called him out. Hemant noted that his father had signed exclusive rights over the story, itself a remake of Yaksha Ganam, and Muthuraman only held the rights to remake and release Yaksha Ganam in Tamil but was fraudulently trying to claim sole ownership over the story, contrary to an agreement he signed with Shanmugam, adding that a case regarding ownership over the rights to the story was pending in court.
