= Pattampoochi =

Pattampoochi (lit. 'Butterfly') may refer to:

- Pattampoochi (1975 film), an Indian Tamil-language drama film
- Pattampoochi (2022 film), an Indian Tamil-language period psychological action thriller film by Badri
