= Sahithi =

Indian playback singer (born 1987)

Sahiti Galidevara
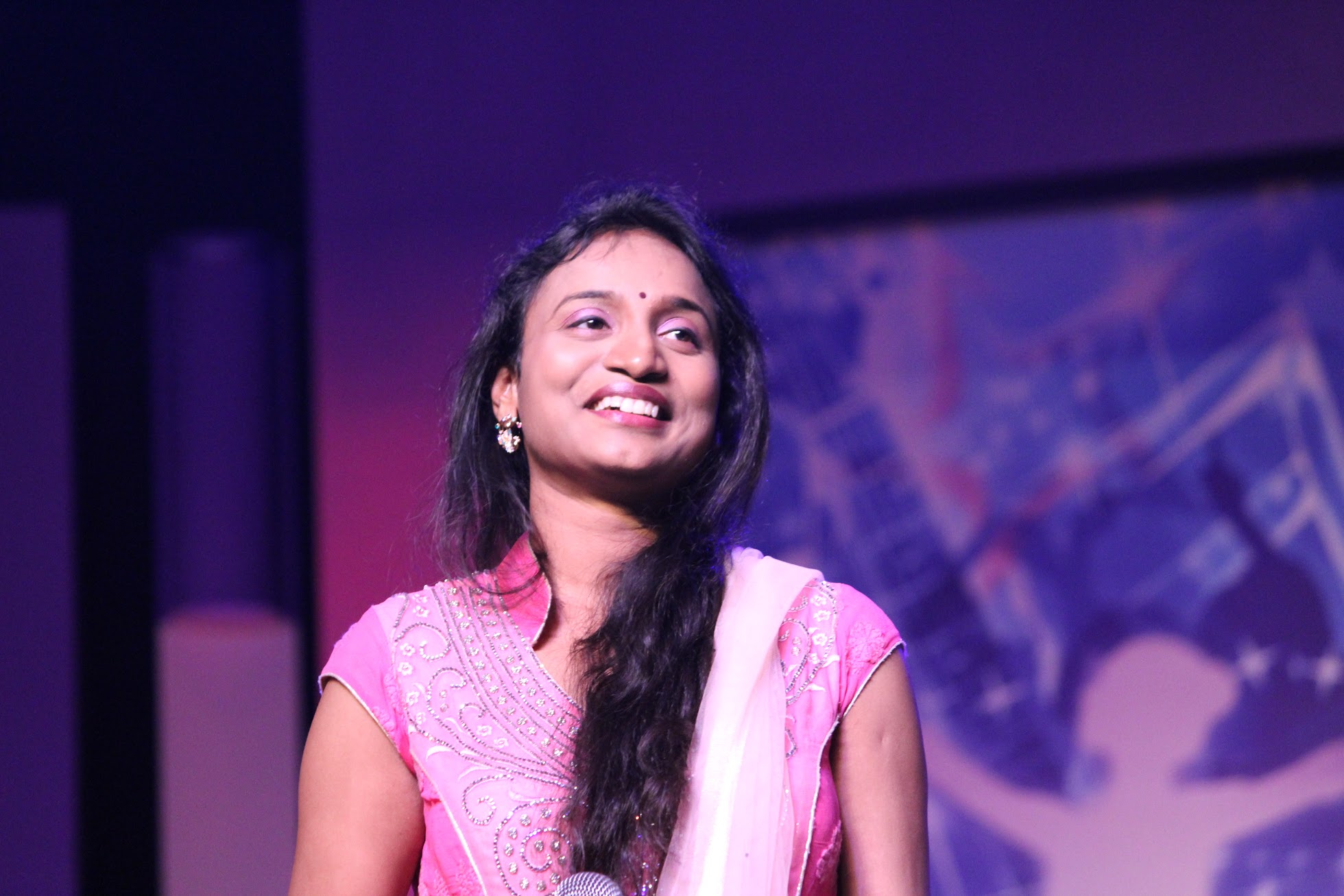
- Sahiti G after X Factor

Background information
- Born: Sahithi Galidevara; 12 February 1987 (age 39)
- Origin: Vizianagaram, Andhra Pradesh, India
- Genre: Filmi
- Occupation: Singer
- Years active: 2008–present

Sahithi Galidevara (born 12 February 1987) is an Indian playback singer. She has recorded several songs in Telugu both in movies and albums.

== Career ==
- She won the regional version of Sa Re Ga Ma Pa – Voice of Youth by Zee Telugu in 2008
- She was one of the 12 finalists in the first season of Sony TV's singing reality show X Factor India (2011)
- She participated in Super Singer 7.
- She won Super singer 8 in Telugu as a mentor in Star MAAtv.
- She was one of the finalists in Super Singer 12 Telugu in Star Maatv.

== Discography ==
- "Jabba Kotti" – Pardhu (2008)
- "Mummy Daddy" – Ek Police (2008)
- "O Xanamaina Chaalu" – Siddu from Srikakulam (2008)
- "Chandamamala Andagadini" – Anaganaga O Dheerudu (2011)
- "Pillalame" – Tolisariga (2011)
- "Kavalante Istale" – Naku Oka Lover Undi (2011)
- "Singarenundhi" – Rachcha (2012)
- "Ruler" – Dammu (2012)
- "Nene Nani ne" – Eega (2012)
- "Gaji biji gathukula" – Sudigadu (2012)
- "Inka emi cheppalo" – Kamina (2012)
- "Naa swasalona pongindi" – Chanakyudu (2012)
- "nee varasa neede" – Routine Love Story (2012)
- "Chal Challe" – Ongole Gitta (2013)
- "Yela Yela" – Priyathama Neevachata Kusalama (2013)
- "Kothaga nee pairichayam" – Biskett 2013
- "Anu anu" – romance 2013
- "Soodimande" – Doosukeltha (2013)
- "Vastha vasthava" – prema geema janta nai (2013)
- "Milky meenakshi" – prema geema janta nai (2013)
- "magadheerudee" – rajakota rahasyam (2013)
- "love you ra" – Hum Tum (2013)
- "Neelakasam Karigi" – Mudduga (2013)
- "Adugulu kalisi" – Mudduga (2013)
- "Naa kallalona – Hum Tum (2013)
- Manasuni Mamathani" – Gallotelinattunde (2013)
- "Tirugubaatidi" – Basanti (2013)
- "O Ningey Thuli Holi" - Kaalicharan (2013)
- "Atu Amalapuram Remix" – Kotha Janta (2014)
- "Yevaritho modati adugu" – Green Signal (2014)
- "ohh kooni ragama" – Amrutham Chandamamalo (2014)
- "yeruvaka sagaro remix" – Amrutham Chandamamalo (2014)
- "Alli nodu" – Shivam 2015
- "Dreamigey bandhe" – Shivam 2015
- "Halavaru" – Buguri 2016
- "Rai Rai" – Rule (2016)
- "Silicon Valley Figure" - Oru Nodiyil (2016 - Tamil dub of Parvathipuram)
- "Simla Apple Naa Pere" - Parvathipuram (2016)
- "Boost pilla" – Aaradugula Bullet 2017
- "Pink lips" – Loukyam
- "Bhagmathie theme song" – Bhagmathi
- "Neeyagigrein" - Yuvarathnaa (tamil 2021)
- Tereliye - Yuvarathnaa ( Hindi 2021)
- "Naa kaallaku patteelu" - Induvadana (2022)
- "Nene Special" - Sakala Gunabhirama (2022)
- "Nyayaanni" ("Mother Song") - Sebastian P.C. 524(2022)
- "Na Kanti kalalani” (2023) - Galodu
- "Avakaya Anjaneya” - Hanu-Man (2024)
- "Panchuko" - Baak (2024)
- "Nenemi Sethura Devara" - Committee Kurrollu (2024)

== Albums ==
- What Happen to me, Velige Deepam, Plz Vinaddu from the album Plz Vinaddu (2011)
- Mudakaratha Modakam, Sumanovandita Sundari from the album Jayaghosha (2011)

== Personal life ==
Sahithi changed her name to Sahithi Galidevara as she is facing issues in credits mapping as there are other singers named Sahithi.
