= Baak (Assamese folklore) =

Mythical creature of Assamese folklore

Baak, Bak or Ghorabak (Assamese: বাঁক, ঘোঁৰাবাঁক; IPA: ['bak]) is a shapeshifting creature that frequently appears in folktales in Assam. The baak is believed to live near water bodies and is usually malevolent in nature, troubling fishermen among others. The baak is fond of fish. Unlike many other creatures which are limited to parts of the state, the baak finds space in folklore across Assam.

== Appearance ==
Baaks are usually tall and thin, with long legs and arms. In villages, very tall and skinny people are often compared to Baaks. They usually have little to no hair.

== Powers and habits ==
The baak is usually believed to be malevolent in nature. It lives near water bodies and enjoys raw fish. They can cast nets to catch fish on their own. While fishermen are busy fishing in lakes, ponds, or along the banks, they quietly eat the fish and deplete the stock. It is sometimes believed that if the fisherman is killed or rendered unconscious, they take on the fisherman's form and visit the host's house.

Baak can be murderous, drowning its victim to death. It often assumes the form of its victim after death or possesses the victim. It then goes on to live with the victim's family, attempting to kill them too. The Baak can fool people by copying the voices of their loved ones to make them step outside. Therefore, people believe that no one should get up when unknown people call in the middle of the night.

Carrying a torn fishing net can help avoid baaks, as they are said to be afraid of it. There is a cycle of stories where the baak assumes the form of a man to live with his wife. Kishore Bhattacharjee notes that this may be associated with unconscious fears of extra-marital love from the male point of view.

Baaks are not always described to be murderous however. Many a times, benign baaks simply possess victims or play tricks with them, particularly with children.

Sometimes, baak is described as carrying a pouch that contains its powers. The baak's life depends on it and taking possession of it can make one its master. However, Benudhar Rajkhowa in his classic "Assamese demonology" assigns these attributes to the doit and not the baak.

== Classification ==
Rajkhowa in his "Assamese Demonology" classifies Assamese spirits into "sub-terrananian", "terrestrial", "aerial" and "celestial". He places the baak among the terrestrial. The terrestrial spirits are further classified into aqueous, sylvan and household. Rajkhowa classifies the baak as an aqueous spirit, listing it as the first in his list of five major aqueous spirits. Rajkhowa describes the following folk idiom to connect baak to waters:

Assamese: Hanhor uporot xiyal roja, Pota pukhurit bak roja
Translation: A jackal is the lord of poultry, A bak is supreme in a deserted tank.

Kishore Bhattacharjee notes in his contribution to "Folklore as Discourse" that everyday Assamese legends usually generate expectations of black magic; spirits of rivers, lakes and trees; names of places; buried treasure; origin of temples; healers and wise folks; and history seen by people including saint legends, partly based on the work of Christensen and Kvideland. The stories of the baak apparently come under the second category. However, stories of ghosts and spirits internationally known as legends are not culturally identified as legend here, according to Bhattacharjee.

== In popular culture ==
Bakor Putek (The Bak's son) is an Assamese movie released in 2012 that focuses on the social and personal consequences of superstition in rural Assam. The belief in stories of the Bak assuming the form of the husband and living with his wife after killing him brings trouble to the lives of a married couple. The 2024 Tamil film Aranmanai 4 also features the story of Bak.
