= Aranmanai =

2014 Indian film by Sundar C

- Theatrical release poster
- Directed by: Sundar C
- Written by: Venkat Raghavan (dialogues)
- Screenplay by: Sundar C; S.B.Ramadoss
- Story by: Sundar C
- Produced by: D. Dinesh Karthick
- Starring: Sundar C; Vinay; Santhanam; Hansika Motwani; Andrea Jeremiah; Raai Laxmi
- Cinematography: U. K. Senthil Kumar
- Edited by: Srikanth N.B.
- Music by: Bharadwaj (original); Karthik Raja (background score)
- Production company: Vision i Medias
- Distributed by: Sri Thenandal Films; Red Giant Movies
- Release date: 19 September 2014
- Running time: 161 minutes
- Country: India
- Language: Tamil
- Budget: ₹12 crore
- Box office: est. ₹22 crore

Aranmanai (transl. Palace) is a 2014 Indian Tamil-language comedy horror film directed by Sundar C. Produced by Vision i Medias, it is the first film in the Aranmanai series. Loosely based on Aayiram Jenmangal (1978), the film features an ensemble cast including Sundar, Vinay, Santhanam, Hansika Motwani, Andrea Jeremiah, and Raai Laxmi. In the film, a family returns to their hometown to sell their ancestral palace, but their arrival is marked by supernatural events, and a relative of the family decides to uncover the truth.

Filming for Aranmanai took place between September 2013 and January 2014, while post-production took place over the next several months. The film was released on 19 September 2014 and became a commercial success. The first of three successors, Aranmanai 2 was released 2016.

== Plot ==
In a village, Ayyanar leads a group of people to clean a palace whose owners plan to sell it. At night, the cook is frightened by some supernatural being in the palace and disappears.

The next day, an estranged Eshwari returns to the village with her husband Kesavan and son Muliankannan, along with her older brother and his daughter, Maya. The pair, and their late elder brother's son Murali and his new wife Madhavi, have gathered to sell their palace off to Ayyanar. Meanwhile, Paalsamy sneaks into the palace disguised as a cook to find a photo that is the sole evidence that he is also an heir to the palace so Paalsamy can claim his share of the money. Strange events begin to happen during their stay at the palace. Madhavi sees a servant's daughter talking to a mysterious girl called Selvi, who no one else can see. The girl's mother explains that she is mentally impaired. Mishaps continue to happen, delaying the sale of the palace and the family extend their stay. Meanwhile, two other servants go missing. Ravi, Madhavi's elder brother, visits the palace to meet his sister. Later, Madhavi and Maya tell Ravi of the strange happenings, so Ravi sets up cameras around the palace with Maya's help.

While watching the camera feed, Ravi sees a worker backing away from something, but the camera's feed suddenly dies. At the same time, a fortune teller in front of the house runs away in terror after seeing something. On the next day, the police find the bodies of the missing servants in a local pond. Ravi is shocked and visits the fortune teller, who reveals he witnessed a woman possessed by a vengeful spirit kill a worker. The fortune teller gives him an egg and informs him that when the possessed person is near the egg, the egg will spin. To Ravi's horror, the egg reacts to Madhavi. Since the little girl always speaks of a woman named Selvi, Ravi sets out to investigate. Ayyanar becomes angry when mentioned about Selvi, who stole the temple's jewels and ran away from the village. However, Selvi's friend Ramya tells Ravi that Selvi is a good person, not a thief, and narrates her flashback.

Past: A few years back, before his marriage, Murali came to the village and fell in love with Selvi. Selvi also likes him, but she is a girl often possessed by the goddess and predicts the future. Wishing to maintain her holiness and wary of the difference in their statuses and lifestyles, she is reluctant to accept his confession. Murali planned to depart the village that morning and asked her to meet him at the palace if she wanted to join him. With Ramya's encouragement, Selvi leaves to confess her love to Murali but disappears before reaching him.

Present: As per Ravi's plan, Ramya comes to meet the possessed Madhavi. Selvi, recognising Ramya, tells her all that happened that day. It had been Ayyanar and his friends who had stolen and replaced the temple jewellery with fakes. When Selvi had touched one of the fakes, she received a premonition and confronted the culprits. When they attacked her, she fled to Murali but narrowly missed him. Ayyanar and his accomplices, the dead servants, brutally killed and buried her inside the palace.

Selvi tells Ramya that she intends to live on with Murali in Madhavi's body. As that day is auspicious, if Murali and Madhavi get intimate, no one can ever drive her out of Madhavi's body. If they cannot consummate their relationship, she will kill Murali so that they will be together in death. After hearing the story, Ravi meets a priest who says there are only two ways to stop Selvi: use a powerful emotion to bring Madhavi to her senses or bring Murali to the river junction where a holy ritual will take place, generating a powerful energy that will lay Selvi to rest. The palace inhabitants disturb Selvi's attempts to become intimate with Murali. Meanwhile, Ravi attempts to find a way to bring Murali to the river junction without tipping off Selvi. Meanwhile, Selvi puts Murali into a trance so that she can track down and kill Ayyanar.

While she is gone, the priest and Ravi try to bring Murali out of his trance and take him to the river, but Selvi returns and attempts to stop them. The priest traps her in a fire circle, and Ravi flees with Murali. Selvi escapes and follows them, and Ravi's car overturns and falls into the river. Selvi tries to drown Murali, but Ravi tells Madhavi is pregnant and brings her to her senses briefly. At the same time, the priests complete the ritual at the river, and its power finally severs Selvi's possession. Madhavi returns to her senses. Selvi disappears, and Madhavi and Murali reunite. Ravi also unites with Maya in the end. And when they all pose for a photograph in front of the palace, a zoomed-in shot shows a ghostly figure moving near a palace window, implying that Selvi has returned to the palace.

== Cast ==
- Sundar C as Adv. Ravi
- Vinay as Murali, Madhavi's husband and Selvi's former lover in the past.
- Santhanam as Paalsamy, a thief who enters the palace as a cook
- Hansika Motwani as Selvi, a village girl and Murali's former lover in the past who get killed by Ayyanar. (Voice dubbed by Savitha Reddy)
- Andrea Jeremiah as Madhavi, Ravi's sister and Murali's wife who get possessed by Selvi's spirit
- Raai Laxmi as Maya, Sivaraman's daughter and Ravi's love interest (Voice dubbed by Renuka Kathir)
- Kovai Sarala as Eshwari
- Manobala as Kesavan, Eshwari's husband
- Nithin Sathya as Mulian Kannan, Eshwari's and Kesavan's son
- Meera Krishnan as Lakshmi, Murali's mother
- Chitra Lakshmanan as Sivaraman
- Saravanan as Ayyanar
- Kota Srinivasa Rao as Swamiji
- Baby Priya as Meena
- Ganeshkar as Nallamuthu
- Swaminathan as Nachimithu
- Akila as Ramya, Selvi's unblood sister
- Yogi Babu as Sagidi, a fortune teller
- Santhana Bharathi as Chairman Paramasivam
- Kadhal Dhandapani as Rangan
- Vichu Vishwanath as Samikannu
- Gowtham Sundararajan as Inspector Ramkumar

Cameo appearances

- Manikka Vinayagam as a devotional singer in "Unnaye Enniye"
- Sirkazhi G. Sivachidambaram as a devotional singer in "Unnaye Enniye"
- Sivasankar as a devotional singer in "Unnaye Enniye"
- Aarthi Ganeshkar as Aarthi

== Production ==
Sundar C stated that he initially felt the horror genre would only appeal to men, but seeing how his family enjoyed a horror film, he was inspired to make one which became Aranmanai. Hansika Motwani confirmed in September 2013 that she had signed the film. She also stated she plays the main lead and that the story revolves around her character, which was later reported to be a woman with supernatural powers. Ragini Dwivedi had initially signed up for the film, but was later replaced by Raai Laxmi.

Filming started in late September 2013 at Pollachi. The film largely takes place in a palace, for which a set created by Mohan Babu in Hyderabad was used. ₹2 crore were spent for renovating the palace, in which 70 per cent of the film was shot. Sundar revealed the film would feature over an hour of computer-generated imagery (CGI). Filming was completed in January 2014, while post-production took over six months due to the extensive CGI.

== Music ==
The soundtrack was composed by Bharadwaj and Karthik Raja composed the background score.

Track listing
| No. | Title | Lyrics | Singer(s) | Length |
|---|---|---|---|---|
| 1. | "Katthi Parvakkaari" | Annamalai | Karthik, Surmukhi Raman | 4:34 |
| 2. | "Peeche Peeche" | Pa. Vijay | M. M. Manasi, Surmukhi Raman, Monisha | 4:24 |
| 3. | "Petromax Light" | Pa. Vijay | Velmurugan, Hariharasudhan | 4:52 |
| 4. | "Sonnathu Sonnathu" | Pa. Vijay | Harini, Sadhana Sargam | 4:58 |
| 5. | "Unnaye Enniye" | Piraisoodan | Ananthu, Mukesh Mohamed, M. L. R. Karthikeyan | 6:00 |
| Total length: | | | | 24:48 |

== Marketing and release ==
In mid-August 2014, an unfinished teaser of Aranmanai, lacking final CG, background score and colour correction, was leaked online. Khushbu accused this of being the work of "some miscreant" within the production house. The Tamil Nadu distribution rights of Aranmanai were bought by Sri Thenandal Films which jointly released the film with Red Giant Movies on 19 September 2014.

== Reception ==
=== Critical response ===
M Suganth of The Times of India wrote, "This is kitchen sink filmmaking but there is an assurance in how it is done. The film also feels somewhat overlong but the director manages to keep things moving that we just go with the flow. The visual effects are tacky and often excessive while the performances are functional...but then, the film doesn't take itself too seriously and so, we are able to overlook these niggles, and just about enjoy the ride". Deccan Chronicle gave 3 stars and called it "a film which entertains you with its Sundar's signature style of slapstick comedy combined with some scary moments". Bangalore Mirror wrote, "The horror scenes have been thoughtfully crafted and the principal cast punctuates the thrilling moments with great timing. Tactfully, he (Sundar) has had made a mirch masala from films like Chandramukhi, Arundhathi and Aayiram Jenmangal".

Sify wrote, "The commercial elements comedy, horror and glamour has been mixed in the right proposition by the writer and director. What works is a riveting performance by Hansika, along with comedy track of Santhanam & Co; and is packaged as a fun entertainer by Sundar C". Sudhir Srinivasan of The Hindu wrote, "What's truly scary about Aranmanai is how it brings nothing new to the horror genre...The film has a whole host of stereotypes associated with the horror genre in Tamil cinema...In many ways, Aranmanai is like a time machine. A few scenes into the film and you find yourself transported to the 80s". Rediff.com wrote, "Sundar C seems to have let his fans down with this cliché-ridden supernatural thriller. The narration moves at a slow pace and horror moments are practically non-existent. Even the "Aranmanai", around which the entire story revolves, is not impressive".

=== Box office ===
Sify wrote that Aranmanai had grossed around ₹18 crore in two weeks at the Tamil Nadu box-office. Hindustan Times estimated the film grossed ₹22 crore in total.

== Plagiarism allegations ==
M. Muthuraman, producer of the 1978 Tamil film Aayiram Jenmangal, approached City Civil court in Chennai claiming this film to be a remake of the 1978 film. The court appointed an advocate commissioner to verify the claims. The advocate commissioner on viewing both the films had stated that the plot, theme, storyline and structure were similar in both films. She also held that the script of both films were the same and most scenes were copied and replayed from Aayiram Jenmangal. The report also stated that the viewer of Aranmanai would definitely get the impression that the film is the remake of Aayiram Jenmangal since they had considerable similarities. In January 2016, the court asked both parties to reach an out-of-court settlement, via the Tamil Nadu Mediation and Conciliation Centre.

== Accolades ==
| Award | Category | Recipient(s) | Result | Ref. |
|---|---|---|---|---|
| 4th South Indian International Movie Awards | Best Actress – Tamil | Hansika Motwani | Won | |
| 4th South Indian International Movie Awards | Best Comedian | Kovai Sarala | Nominated | |
| Ananda Vikatan Cinema Awards | Best Comedian – Female | Kovai Sarala | Won | |
| 62nd Filmfare Awards South | Best Supporting Actress | Kovai Sarala | Nominated | |
| 9th Vijay Awards | Best Supporting Actress | Kovai Sarala | Nominated | |
| 9th Vijay Awards | Best Comedian | Santhanam | Nominated | |
| 9th Vijay Awards | Favourite Film | Aranmanai | Nominated | |
| 9th Vijay Awards | Favourite Director | Sundar C | Nominated | |

== Franchise ==
The success of Aranmanai spawned a film series consisting of three more instalments released in 2016, 2021 and 2024. None of the films share continuity, only repeating the themes of the first film.
