= Vichu Vishwanath =

Indian film and television actor (born 1960)

- Born: Vishwanath; 16 May 1960 (age 66); Coimbatore, Tamil Nadu, India
- Occupation: actor
- Years active: 1990–present
- Spouse: Hemalatha
- Children: 1

Vichu Vishwanath is an Indian actor who has appeared in Tamil language films and serials. He has worked in comedy and supporting roles, often associating with director Sundar C.

== Career ==
Vichu Vishwanath was born in Coimbatore, India and attended RK Sreerangammal Kalvi Nilayam Higher Secondary School in the city. Vichu is married to Hemalatha, and has a daughter, Kokila. He made his acting debut in the film, Sandhana Kaatru (1990) and portrayed a villainous character alongside Sarathkumar and Vijay Krishnaraj. During the making of the film, he became acquainted with Sundar C, who was an assistant director in the film. He then made his first collaboration with director Sundar C in Murai Maman (1996), while also beginning an association with actress Radhika and her production studio.

In 2017, he moved on to work on Sundar C's television studio, Nandini.

== Notable filmography ==
Films

- Sandhana Kaatru (1990)
- Thai Maaman (1994)
- Mettupatti Mirasu (1994)
- Murai Mappillai (1995)
- Ullathai Allitha (1996)
- Mettukudi (1996)
- Nesam (1997)
- Thedinen Vanthathu (1997)
- Arunachalam (1997)
- Sishya (1997)
- Ganga Gowri (1997)
- Moovendhar (1998)
- Suyamvaram (1999)
- Unakkaga Ellam Unakkaga (1999)
- Rishi (2001)
- Game (2002)
- Anbe Sivam (2003)
- Winner (2003)
- London (2005)
- Thalainagaram (2006)
- Veerappu (2007)
- Sandai (2008)
- Aayudham Seivom (2008)
- Guru Sishyan (2010)
- Nagaram Marupakkam (2010)
- Mappillai (2011)
- Kalakalappu (2012)
- Murattu Kaalai (2012)
- Theeya Velai Seiyyanum Kumaru (2013)
- Alex Pandian (2013)
- Kaadu (2014)
- Aranmanai (2014)
- Aadama Jaichomada (2014)
- Aambala (2015)
- Thiruttu VCD (2015)
- Aranmanai 2 (2016)
- Hello Naan Pei Pesuren (2016)
- Muthina Kathirika (2016)
- Kannula Kaasa Kattappa (2016)
- Kalakalappu 2 (2018)
- Mannar Vagaiyara (2018)
- Vantha Rajavathaan Varuven (2019)
- Naan Sirithal (2020)
- Naanga Romba Busy (2020)
- Aranmanai 3 (2021)
- Coffee with Kadhal (2022)
- Aranmanai 4 (2024)
- Madha Gaja Raja (2025)
- Gangers (2025)
- Double Occupancy (2026)
- Mookuthi Amman 2 (2026)

=== Television ===
Year	Title	Role	Language	Network
1997–1998	Marmadesam Vidathu Karuppu	Veera Baghu	Tamil	Sun TV
1999–2000	Galatta Sirippu	Seetharaman	Tamil	Sun TV
2005–2006	Selvi	Vichu	Tamil	Sun TV
2007–2008	Arasi	Vichu	Tamil	Sun TV
2009–2012	Chellamay	Solaimalai	Tamil	Sun TV
2009	Naanal		Tamil	Kalaignar TV
2017–2018	Nandini	Vichu	Tamil	Sun TV
2017–2018	Nandini	Vichu	Kannada	Udaya TV
2020	Lakshmi Stores	Varadarajan	Tamil	Sun TV

=== Web series ===
Year	Title	Role	Platform
2025–present	Nadu Center	SPI school's PE teacher	JioHotstar
