= Avni Cinemax =

Indian film production company

- Type: Film production; Film distribution
- Industry: Entertainment
- Founded: 2004
- Founder: Khushbu Sundar; Sundar C
- Headquarters: Chennai, India
- Key people: Khushbu Sundar (actor); Sundar C (director); Avantika Trishala (director)
- Products: Tamil films, serials

Avni Cinemax, also operating as Avni Movies and Avni Telemedia, is an Indian film production and film distribution company run by the married couple Khushbu Sundar and Sundar C. Established in 2004, the company's name is inspired by the first two letters of their daughter Avantika's name.

Khushbu made her debut as a film producer with the 2004 action drama Giri, directed by her husband. The film, starring Arjun Sarja, Reemma Sen and Ramya, performed well at the box office. Encouraged by this, Khushbu continued her role as a producer, taking on numerous projects further listed in this article.

== Filmography ==
=== As film producer ===
Avni Cinemax production credits
Year	Title	Director	Cast	Notes	Ref.
2004	Giri	Sundar C	Arjun, Reemma Sen, Divya Spandana, Vadivelu		
2006	Rendu	Sundar C	Madhavan, Reemma Sen, Anushka Shetty, Vadivelu		
2009	Ainthaam Padai	Badri	Sundar C, Simran, Vivek		
2010	Nagaram Marupakkam	Sundar C	Sundar C, Anuya Bhagwat, Vadivelu		
2012	Kalakalappu	Sundar C	Vemal, Shiva, Anjali, Oviya, Santhanam		
2013	Theeya Velai Seiyyanum Kumaru	Sundar C	Siddharth, Hansika Motwani, Ganesh Venkatraman, Santhanam		
2016	Aranmanai 2	Sundar C	Sundar C, Trisha Krishnan, Siddharth, Hansika Motwani, Poonam Bajwa		
2016	Hello Naan Pei Pesuren	S. Baskar	Vaibhav Reddy, Oviya, Aishwarya Rajesh		
2016	Muthina Kathirika	Venkat Raghavan	Sundar C, Poonam Bajwa, Sathish		
2017	Meesaya Murukku	Hiphop Tamizha	Hiphop Tamizha, Aathmika, Vivek		
2018	Kalakalappu 2	Sundar C	Jiiva, Jai, Shiva, Catherine Tresa, Nikki Galrani		
2019	Natpe Thunai	D. Parthiban Desingu	Hiphop Tamizha, Anagha, Karu Pazhaniappan		
2020	Naan Sirithal	Raana	Hiphop Tamizha, Iswarya Menon		
2020	Naanga Romba Busy	Badri	Prasanna, Shaam, Ashwin Kakumanu, Yogi Babu, Shruti Marathe, Rittika Sen, VTV Ganesh		
2021	Aranmanai 3	Sundar C	Sundar C, Raashii Khanna, Arya, Sakshi Agarwal.		
2022	Pattampoochi	Badri	Sundar C, Jai, Honey Rose		
2022	Coffee with Kadhal	Sundar C	Jai, Jiiva, Srikanth, Amritha Aiyer, Malvika Sharma, Raiza Wilson		
2024	Aranmanai 4	Sundar C	Sundar C, Tamannaah Bhatia, Raashii Khanna	Partially reshot in Telugu as Baak	
2024	Baak	Sundar C	Sundar C, Tamannaah Bhatia, Raashii Khanna	Partially reshot in Telugu as Baak	
2025	Gangers	Sundar C	Sundar C, Vadivelu, Catherine Tresa		
2026	Double Occupancy	Aswin Kandasamy	Santhosh, Vinoth Kishan, Samyuktha Viswanathan, Reshma Venkat		
2026	Meesaya Murukku 2	Hiphop Tamizha	Hiohop Tamizha, Chaithra J Achar, Ketika Sharma		
2026	Mookuthi Amman 2	Sundar C	Nayanthara, Regina Cassandra, Abhinaya, Ineya		
2027	Purushan †	Sundar C	Vishal, Tamannaah Bhatia	Filming	

=== As film distributor ===
Avni Cinemax distribution credits
Year	Title	Director	Cast	Ref.
2007	Veerappu	Badri	Sundar C, Gopika, Prakash Raj, Vivek, Santhanam	

== Television ==
Avni Cinemax television credits
Year	Title	Cast	Network	Ref.
2004–2007	Kalki	Khushbu Sundar	Jaya TV	
2008–2009	Naanal	Sonia Agarwal	Kalaignar TV	
2009–2010	Rudra	Khushbu Sundar	Zee Tamil	
2012–2014	Paartha Gnabagam Illayo	Khushbu Sundar	Kalaignar TV	
2017–2018	Nandhini	Nithya Ram, Adhithri, Malavika Wales, Rahul Ravi	Sun TV	
2017–2019	Nandhini	Nithya Ram, Adhithri, Malavika Wales, Rahul Ravi	Udaya TV	
2018	Maya	Ayesha, Nakshatra Srinivas	Sun TV	
2018–2020	Lakshmi Stores	Khushbu Sundar, Nakshatra Nagesh, Hussain Ahmed Khan	Sun TV	
2019	Lakshmi Stores	Khushbu Sundar, Nakshatra Nagesh, Hussain Ahmed Khan	Gemini TV	
2021	Jothi	Meghashree, Chandana Shetty	Sun TV	
2022	Meera	Khushbu Sundar, Suresh	Colors Tamil	
2025; 2026–present	Sarojini	Khushbu Sundar	DD Tamil	
