= Aranmanai 3 =

2021 film by Sundar C

- Theatrical release poster
- Directed by: Sundar C
- Written by: Sundar C
- Produced by: Khushbu Sundar; Sundar C (co-producer); A.C.S. Arunkumar; A. C. Shanmugam
- Starring: Sundar C; Arya; Raashii Khanna; Andrea Jeremiah
- Cinematography: U. K. Senthil Kumar
- Edited by: Fenny Oliver
- Music by: C. Sathya
- Production companies: Avni Cinemax; Benzz Media
- Distributed by: Red Giant Movies
- Release date: 14 October 2021
- Running time: 156 minutes
- Country: India
- Language: Tamil

Aranmanai 3 (transl. Palace 3) is a 2021 Indian Tamil-language comedy horror film directed by Sundar C. Produced by Avni Cinemax and Benzz Media, it is the third instalment in the Aranmanai film series. The film stars an ensemble cast including Arya, Raashii Khanna, Sundar C, Andrea Jeremiah, Sakshi Agarwal, Vivek, Myna Nandhini, Yogi Babu, Nalini, Manobala, Sampath Raj, Ovi Bhandarkar, Vincent Asokan, Madhusudhan Rao and Vela Ramamoorthy. In the film, a woman is threatened by a vengeful spirit, as she tries to discover the truth with her relative.

Aranmanai 3 was announced in January 2020, with Sundar returning as director. Sun Pictures was initially set to produce, but Avni Cinemax and Benzz Media later took over. Principal photography began in February 2020 but was stalled due to the COVID-19 pandemic in India, resuming that November and concluded the same year. Post-production works took over six months. The music was composed by C. Sathya, cinematography was handled by U. K. Senthil Kumar and editing by Fenny Oliver.

Aranmanai 3 was released by theatrically on 14 October 2021, coinciding with Ayudha Pooja, by Red Giant Movies. The film received mixed to negative reviews from critics and audiences, but emerged a commercial success at the box-office. The fourth instalment in the series, Aranmanai 4, was released in 2024.

== Plot ==
The film begins with a young Jyothi encountering a spirit in her home, terrifying her. Her father, Zamindar Rajasekhar, resents Jyothi as her mother died giving birth to her. Believing she is lying for attention, he angrily sends her to a boarding school.

Many years later, a court ruling forces Rajasekhar to open a secret room at the village temple. Rajasekhar is terrified and angry at the court ruling and is relieved when they find nothing inside the room. Soon after, Rajasekhar's manservant and driver, Durai, dies by electrocution. Jyothi, now an adult, returns for Durai's funeral and falls in love with her childhood sweetheart, Saravanan. Jyothi realises that the spirit that haunted her is now haunting her young relative, Shalu. Jyothi is later lured to her late mother's room and nearly killed by a falling chandelier, but a portrait of her late mother, Eeshwari, saves her. She later has another encounter with both Eeshwari's spirit and the spirit haunting Shalu. One night, Shalu argues with the hostile spirit and is doused in paint thinner. She is chased by flames and rescued by her father, Ravi. Jyothi convinces Ravi to investigate the mysterious occurrences for Shalu's sake.

Ravi investigates Eeshwari's room and discovers a photo of Jyothi’s parents with three servants, with the faces of two servants scratched out. He encounters Eeshwari's spirit, and the third servant in the photo gets murdered shortly after. Ravi and Jyothi bring priests to exorcise the palace. They trap one of the two ghosts, but the other appears and destroys the trap, revealing that it has possessed Saravanan. Ravi tells Jyothi that this spirit is Eeshwari, who was responsible for the murders and the attack on Shalu. The deaths spooks Rajasekhar and visits Saamiyaadi, a hermit priest. Saravanan attacks the pair. Ravi manages to rescue Rajasekhar, but Saamiyaadi is left behind, and Eeshwari confronts him. Rajasekhar reveals the truth to Ravi and Vallimalai Swamiji.

In the past, Rajasekhar had forcibly married Eeshwari after falling for her at her wedding to Saamiyaadi's son, Samikannu. When their child is born, the child resembles Samikannu, and Rajasekhar realises she had already been pregnant at the wedding. A furious Rajasekhar has the child secretly killed and buried in the palace, then stabs Eeshwari, killing her. He replaces the dead child with Durai's newborn daughter and claims her as his own. Samikannu steals Eeshwari's body and attempts to use black magic to revive her but is horrified when she returns as a ghoul and abandons her in the forest. Eeshwari later kills the midwife who poisoned her child and threatens Rajasekhar. Rajasekhar convinces Saamiyaadi to help him destroy the spirit his son revived. Saamiyaadi tricks Samikannu into luring out Eeshwari's spirit and traps her in the hidden room in the temple. During the attempt, Saamiyaadi accidentally kills Samikannu and withdraws to the forest to mourn.

In the present, Eeshwari reveals to Saamiyadi that he did not kill Samikannu, but Durai killed Samikannu on Rajasekhar's order. She wants to replace the soul in Jyothi’s body with that of her dead child, believing that Jyothi is living the life that her child should have had. She convinces Saamiyaadi to raise Samikannu's spirit and help her. Saamiyaadi dies raising the spirit of his son. Ravi and Jyothi trap and take the spirit of Eeshwari's child to the priests who had helped them. They initially try to lay her and Eeshwari to rest, but the arrival of Samikannu blindsided them. Eeshwari's spirit kills Rajasekhar, but Jyothi, Ravi, and the priests banish the three spirits with the help of the goddess, freeing Saravanan.

Saravanan and Jyothi marry, hinting at a sequel.

== Cast ==
- Arya as Saravanan, an electrician, Jyothi's love interest (possessed)
- Raashii Khanna as Jyothi, Saravanan's love interest, believed to be the daughter of Rajasekhar and Eeshwari (Voice dubbed by Smruthi K)
  - Veronika Arora as Young Jyothi
- Sundar C as Ravi, Hema's husband, Shalu's father
- Andrea Jeremiah as Eeshwari "Raani", Rajasekhar's late wife, Samikannu's love interest
- Sakshi Agarwal as Hema, Ravi's wife, Shalu's mother, Sarala's daughter (Voice dubbed by Priya Anand)
- Vivek as Sigamani, a failed politician, Mynavathi's husband and Rajasekhar's brother-in-law
- Yogi Babu as Abhishek, a thief, Saravanan's friend
- Myna Nandhini as Mynavathi, Sigamani's wife, Sarala and Rajasekhar's sister
- Sampath Raj as Rajasekhar, a Zamindar, Sarala's younger brother & Mynavathi's elder brother, Jyothi's adopted father and Eeshwari's husband
- Nalini as Sarala, Rajasekhar and Mynavathi's elder sister, Hema's mother, Ravi's mother-in-law, Shalu's grandmother (Voice dubbed by Nithya Ravindar)
- Cell Murugan as Manickam, Money lender's assistant
- Manobala as Pencil, a thief, Abhishek's assistant
- Vela Ramamoorthy as Saamiyaadi, and Samikannu's father
- Ovi Bhandarkar as Shalu, Sarala's granddaughter, Ravi and Hema's daughter
- Amit Bhargav as Samikannu, Eeshwari's lover, Saamiyaadi's son
- Vincent Ashokan as Durai, a driver, Jyothi’s biological father
- Vichu Vishwanath as Kaali, a gardener
- Kulappulli Leela as Valliamma, a cook
- Madhusudan Rao as Vallimalai Swamiji
- TSR Srinivasan as the temple priest
- Sri Ganesh as IAS Collector

Cameo appearances in the song "Theeyaga Thondri"

- Hariharan as a devotional singer
- Shankar Mahadevan as a devotional singer
- C. Sathya

== Production ==
=== Development ===
After the release of Action (2019), in January 2020, sources claimed that director Sundar C will make his third instalment for the Aranmanai film series to following the success of two films Aranmanai (2014) and Aranmanai 2 (2016). In March 2020, Sundar announced that the film will be produced by Avni Cinemax and Khushbu within their own production house.

=== Casting ===
Arya and Raashii Khanna confirmed in January 2020 that they had signed the film. The film marks the first collaboration between them. A source revealed that Khanna's role would have a huge importance in the film. Khanna allotted 30 days to shoot Aranmanai 3. This was the first film in the series not to feature Hansika Motwani. Instead, Andrea Jeremiah, who had also appeared in the first instalment, signed on. At the time, Sakshi Agarwal was also in talks for to play an important role, which was later finalised. Singers Shankar Mahadevan and Hariharan made cameo appearances. Andrea later revealed that she was playing the role of a ghost, and that the story revolves around her character.

=== Filming and post-production ===
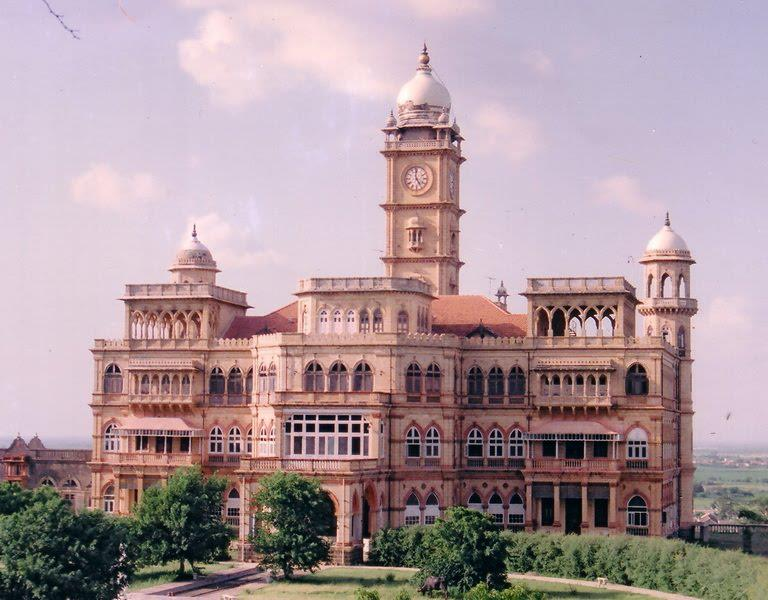
Wankaner palace, where the film was shot

Principal photography began at the Gujarat Wankaner palace in February 2020. Shortly thereafter, filming was stalled due to the COVID-19 pandemic, and resumed that November in Pollachi. More than Rs. 2 crore had been spent to construct the set used for the climax sequence. The climax portions were filmed in 16 days, with 200 background workers. Filming ended the same year.

Post-production works had begun by January 2021. In April, Sundar tested positive for COVID-19, when the film was still in post-production. Computer graphics work was conducted for 6 months.

== Music ==
Aranmanai 3

Soundtrack album by C. Sathya
- Released: August 30, 2021
- Recorded: 2020–2021
- Genre: Feature film soundtrack
- Length: 20:11
- Language: Tamil
- Label: Saregama
- Producer: C. Sathya

C. Sathya chronology
Naanga Romba Busy (2020)	Aranmanai 3 (2021)	Theal (2021)

The film's soundtrack was composed by C. Sathya, who was collaborating for second time with Sundar C after Theeya Velai Seiyyanum Kumaru (2013). The audio rights were acquired by Saregama. The first single "Ratapatata", sung by Arivu, was released on 30 August 2021. The second single "Rasavaachiye", sung by Sid Sriram, was released on 13 September 2021. The third single "Lojakku Mojakku" was sung by Mukesh and released on 22 September 2021. The fourth single "Sengaandhale", sung by Reema, released on 6 October 2021. The fifth and final single, "Theeyaga Thondri", sung by Shankar Mahadevan and Hariharan, was released on 12 October 2021.

Track listing
No.	Title	Lyrics	Singer(s)	Length
1.	"Ratatapata"	Arivu	Arivu, Ranina Reddy	3:24
2.	"Rasavaachiye"	Mohan Rajan	Sid Sriram	3:24
3.	"Lojakku Mojakku"	Mohan Rajan	Mukesh Mohamed	3:38
4.	"Sengaandhale"	Pa. Vijay	Reema	4:59
5.	"Theeyaga Thondri"	Nattu Raja Durai	Shankar Mahadevan, Hariharan	4:47
Total length:				20:11

== Marketing ==
The official trailer of the film was released on 30 September 2021, and received two million views in less than 24 hours.

== Release ==
=== Theatrical ===
In mid-September 2021, Aranmanai 4 was cleared by the censor board, and its distribution rights for Tamil Nadu were acquired by Red Giant Movies. The film was released in theatres on 14 October, coinciding with Ayudha Puja.

=== Home media ===
The streaming rights were sold to ZEE5, where it began streaming on 12 November 2021.

== Reception ==
=== Critical response ===
Aranmanai 3 received mixed reviews from critics.

Manoj Kumar R. of The Indian Express gave 0.5 out of 5 stars and called it, "The dumbest film of the year yet". Bharathy Singaravel of The News Minute gave the movie 1.5 stars and said, "No ghost, spirit or spectre doomed to haunt the same house for eternity has felt more trapped than I did in the theatre today. Even an end credit song by Arivu couldn’t keep me from fleeing for the exit the second the lights came on. Avoid Aranmanai 3 with the same dedication that Sundar C shows in evading at arriving at a conclusion in this film."

Praveen Sudevan of The Hindu said Sundar C's third instalment in the ‘Aranmanai’ franchise succeeds neither in scaring the audience nor making them laugh. The Times of India gave 3 stars to the film and said, "It all happens in predictable fashion, and by the time the film ends, we neither feel overwhelmed nor underwhelmed. That, in a way, is the director's success – making us feel contended [sic] with a passable and instantly forgettable entertainer." Karthikeyan S of Dinamani said that overall it is doubtful whether even those who liked the first and second parts of Aranmanai will like this film.

Sudhir Srinivasan of Cinema Express wrote, "We have seen in multiple carbon copy films in this genre. Even still, it’s astonishing how little Aranmanai 3 seems to care about being novel". Subha J. Rao of Film Companion wrote, "What is the point of taking forward a franchise when there’s little to redeem it? It’s just a waste of everyone’s time."

=== Box office ===
Despite its reviews, Aranmanai 3 had a good opening on the first day of its theatrical release. It grossed around ₹4 crore on the opening day, and became a hit at the box-office, collecting over ₹15 crore in the first four days of its release.

== Future ==
The fourth installment, titled Aranmanai 4, was released on 3 May 2024.
