= Mundota Fort and Palace =

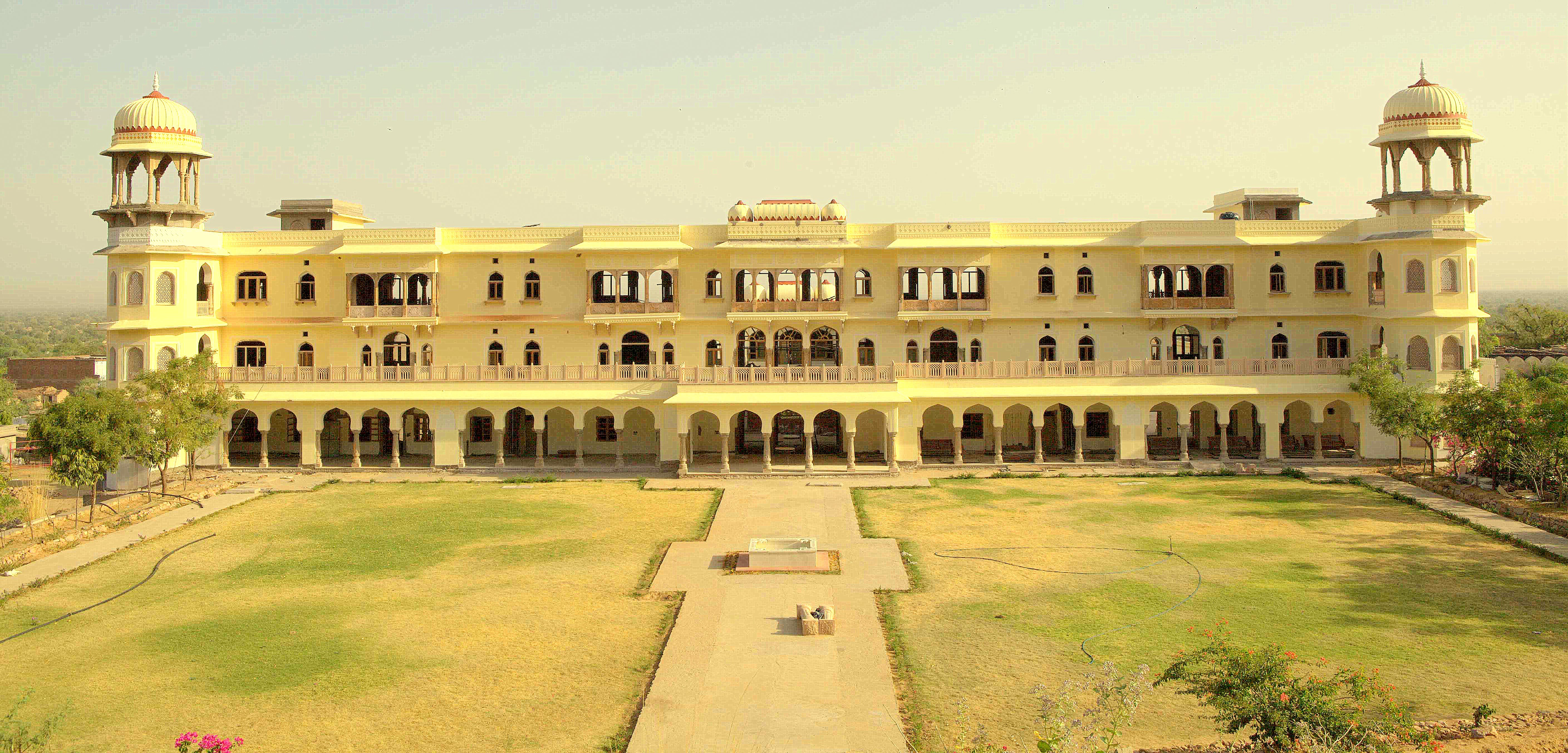
- Renovations at Mundota Fort and Palace as of 1 April 2013

- Location within Rajasthan

General information
- Architectural style: Rajput and Mughal Architecture
- Location: Mundota and Jaipur, India
- Coordinates: 26.96°N 75.62°E
- Completed: 1550 AD
- Renovated: 2011-2013

Mundota Fort and Palace are approximately 450-year-old heritage monuments and structures located in Mundota, a small town in the hills of the Aravali Range in the state of Rajasthan in north-western India. Mundota was a Double Tazmi Jagir of the Nathawat clan of the Kachwaha dynasty, the rulers of Jaipur.

The palace was built around 1550 by Jaswant Singh, a contemporary of the Mughal emperor Akbar. The fort predates the palace by at least a century.
