= Hansika Motwani =

Indian actress (born 1991)

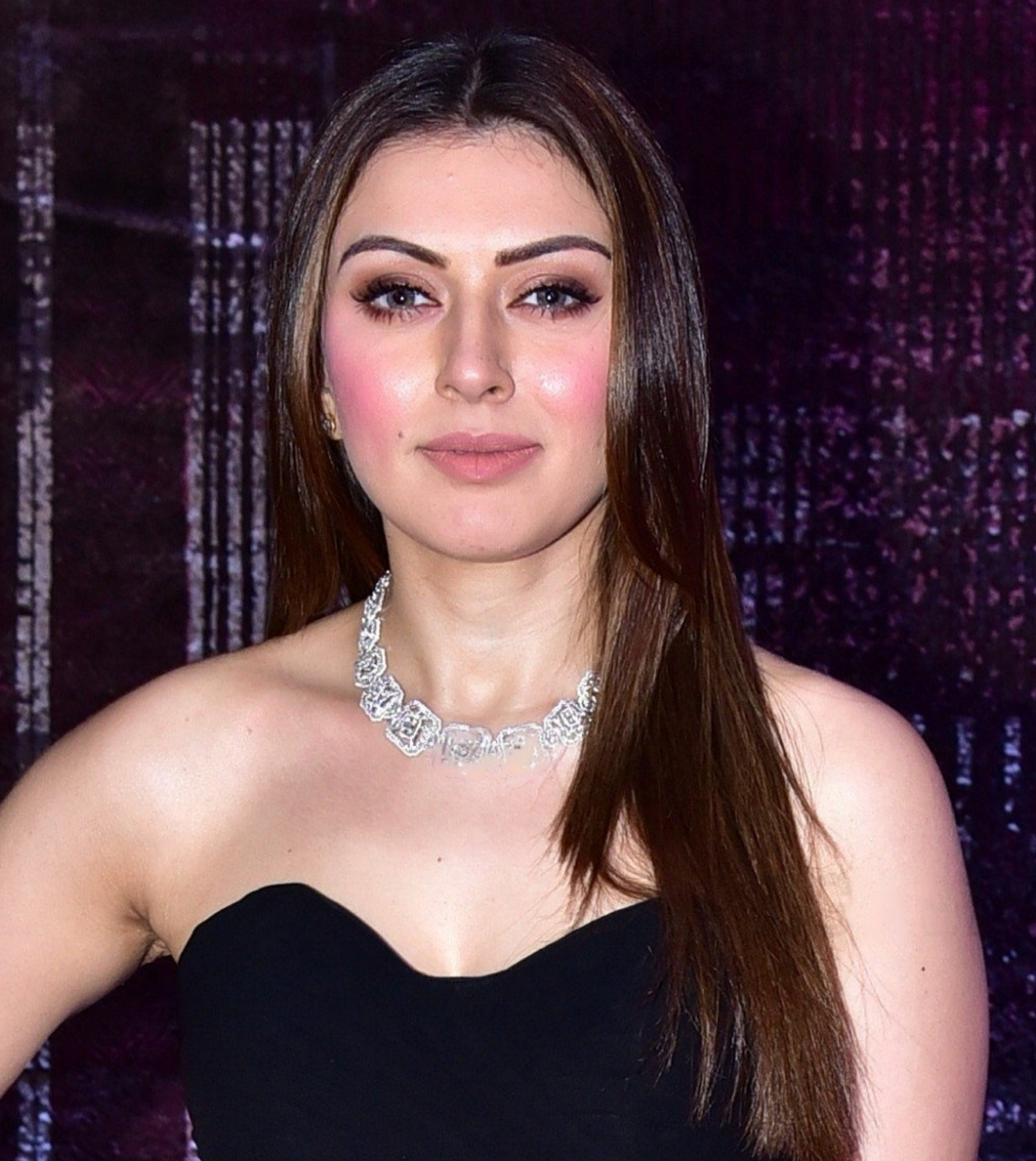
- Motwani in 2023
- Born: 9 August 1991 (age 35); Mumbai, Maharashtra, India
- Occupation: Actress
- Years active: 2001-present
- Spouse: Sohail Khaturiya (m. 2022; div. 2026)

Hansika Motwani (born 9 August 1991) is an Indian actress who predominantly appears in Tamil and Telugu films. Motwani began her career as a child actor in Hindi films, and later went on to appear in lead roles in Telugu films, including Desamuduru (2007), Kantri (2008) and Maska (2009). She started her career in Tamil cinema with Mappillai (2011) and then appeared in several commercially successful Tamil films such as Engeyum Kadhal (2011), Velayudham (2011), Oru Kal Oru Kannadi (2012), Theeya Velai Seiyyanum Kumaru (2013), Singam II (2013) and Aranmanai (2014). She has also acted in the Malayalam film Villain (2017).

== Early life ==
Hansika Motwani, hailing from a Sindhi Hindu family, was born on 9 August 1991 in Mumbai, Maharashtra. Her father, Pradeep Motwani, is a businessman, while her mother, Mona Motwani, is a dermatologist. She received her education at the Podar International School and the International Curriculum School, Santacruz both located in Mumbai.

== Career ==
=== 2001–2010 ===
Motwani began her television career as a child actor with a serial called Shaka Laka Boom Boom. She later acted in the Indian serial Des Mein Niklla Hoga Chand and appeared as one of the children in Koi... Mil Gaya. She also did ad campaigns for Bournvita, Onida and Santro, as a child artiste.

She made her debut in 2007 at the age of 15 in a lead role in Puri Jagannadh's Telugu film Desamuduru and earned the Filmfare Award for Best Female Debut – South for her performance. She later appeared in the Hindi film Aap Kaa Surroor with Himesh Reshammiya.

Her first 2008 release was Bindaas, starring Puneeth Rajkumar, and is her first and only Kannada film to date. Later that year, she appeared in Kantri with Jr. NTR.

=== 2011–2015 ===
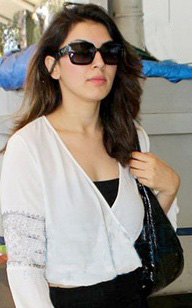
Hansika in 2016

Motwani debuted in Tamil cinema with Mappillai. Her next Tamil film, Engeyum Kadhal was a successful one. The same year she went on to star alongside Vijay in Velayudham.

In 2012, she had two releases, one in Tamil and another one in Telugu. Her first release was M. Rajesh's romantic comedy film Oru Kal Oru Kannadi which became her first runaway hit and earned her positive reviews for her performance. In Telugu, she was featured in Denikaina Ready which also earned a positive response from the public. She received her first Best Actress nomination at the 60th Filmfare Awards South for her performance in the films. In 2013, she appeared in four Tamil films such as Settai, Sundar C's Theeya Velai Seiyyanum Kumaru, Hari's Singam II starring Suriya and Venkat Prabhu's Biriyani with Suriya's brother Karthi. She had five releases in 2014, two of them were Telugu films, the comedy flick Pandavulu Pandavulu Tummeda and the action-masala film Power. Her Tamil releases were the fantasy film Maan Karate with Sivakarthikeyan, Sundar C's horror comedy Aranmanai and the action thriller film Meaghamann.

Aambala, her third collaboration with Sundar C, was her first 2015 release. Her second release that year was Romeo Juliet, which marked her second film with Jayam Ravi. She also appeared in Vaalu with Silambarasan.

=== 2016–present ===
In 2016, Aranmanai 2 directed by Sundar C received mixed reviews. Motwani had a list of flops later that year, including Uyire Uyire and Pokkiri Raja. Her last release in 2016 was Manithan with Udhayanidhi Stalin.

Bogan was her first release in 2017 and it was reviewed positively. Many critics praised her for her performance in the introduction scene and the pre-climax scene. She also acted in a Telugu film Luckunnodu. She debuted in Malayalam films with Villain in 2017.

Her first release of 2018 was Gulaebaghavali in which she played a con-artist's role named Viji. Her other release of 2018 was Thuppakki Munai, starring Vikram Prabhu. In 2019, she appeared with Atharvaa in the Tamil film 100, directed by Sam Anton and in the Telugu film Tenali Ramakrishna BA. BL opposite Sundeep Kishan.

For her 50th film, Motwani was the lead actress in Maha (2022). She was seen in the horror 105 Minuttess (2024) and Guardian (2024).

== Personal life ==
Motwani regularly practices meditation. She said in an interview, "The best way to effectively de-stress for me is to chant- Nam Myo Ho Renge Kyo, as I strongly follow Buddhism." According to the actress, chanting has helped her personally and professionally.

Since 2015, Motwani was in a relationship with Silambarasan for a few years. She married her longtime boyfriend, businessman Sohail Khaturiya on 4 December 2022 in Mundota Fort and Palace, Jaipur. The couple got divorced on 11 March 2026, with Motwani refusing to seek alimony.

== Other work and media image ==
Motwani participates in philanthropic activities. She provides monetary support for the education of underprivileged children and women who are suffering with breast cancer. She is the brand Ambassador of Chennai turns Pink, an awareness program to promote breast cancer awareness among women.

In 2014, she was featured in Forbes's 250 celebrities list.

== Filmography ==
Key
†	Denotes films that have not yet been released

=== Films ===
List of films and roles
Year	Title	Role	Language	Notes	Ref.
2003	Hawa	Sasha	Hindi	Child artist	
2003	Koi... Mil Gaya	Rohit's friend	Hindi	Child artist	
2004	Jaago	Shruti Verma	Hindi	Child artist	
2004	Hum Kaun Hai?	Sara Williams	Hindi	Child artist	
2004	Aabra Ka Daabra	Pinky	Hindi	Child artist	
2007	Desamuduru	Vaishali	Telugu	Filmfare Award for Best Female Debut – South	
2007	Aap Kaa Surroor	Riya Bakshi	Hindi	Nominated—Filmfare Award for Best Female Debut	
2008	Bindaas	Preethi	Kannada		
2008	Kantri	Varalakshmi / Hamsa	Telugu		
2008	Money Hai Toh Honey Hai	Ashima Kapoor	Hindi		
2009	Maska	Meenakshi 'Meenu'	Telugu		
2009	Billa	Priya	Telugu	Cameo appearance	
2009	Jayeebhava	Anjali	Telugu		
2010	Seeta Ramula Kalyanam Lankalo	Nandhini	Telugu		
2011	Mappillai	Gayathri	Tamil		
2011	Engeyum Kadhal	Kayalvizhi (Lolita)	Tamil		
2011	Kandireega	Shruthi	Telugu	Nominated, SIIMA Award for Best Actress (Telugu)	
2011	Velayudham	Vaidehi	Tamil		
2011	Oh My Friend	Ritu Sharma	Telugu		
2012	Oru Kal Oru Kannadi	Meera Mahendrakumar	Tamil		
2012	Denikaina Ready	Sharmila	Telugu	Nominated, Filmfare Award for Best Actress – Telugu	
2013	Settai	Madhumitha	Tamil		
2013	Theeya Velai Seiyyanum Kumaru	Sanjana	Tamil		
2013	Singam II	Sathya	Tamil		
2013	Biriyani	Priyanka	Tamil	25th Film	
2014	Pandavulu Pandavulu Tummeda	Honey	Telugu		
2014	Maan Karate	Yazhini Sethuraman	Tamil		
2014	Power	Nirupama	Telugu		
2014	Aranmanai	Selvi	Tamil		
2014	Meaghamann	Usha	Tamil		
2015	Aambala	Maya	Tamil		
2015	Romeo Juliet	Aishwarya (Subbulakshmi)	Tamil		
2015	Vaalu	Priya Mahalakshmi	Tamil		
2015	Puli	Princess Manthagini	Tamil		
2015	Size Zero	Herself	Telugu	Bilingual film; cameo appearance	
2015	Inji Iduppazhagi	Herself	Tamil	Bilingual film; cameo appearance	
2016	Aranmanai 2	Maya	Tamil		
2016	Pokkiri Raja	Sunitha	Tamil		
2016	Uyire Uyire	Priya	Tamil		
2016	Manithan	Priya	Tamil		
2017	Luckunnodu	'Positive' Padma	Telugu		
2017	Bogan	Mahalakshmi	Tamil		
2017	Singam 3	Sathya	Tamil	Special appearance	
2017	Goutham Nanda	Spoorthi	Telugu		
2017	Villain	Dr. Shreya Venkatesh	Malayalam		
2018	Gulaebaghavali	Viji	Tamil		
2018	Thuppakki Munai	Mythili	Tamil		
2019	NTR: Kathanayakudu	Jaya Prada	Telugu	Special appearance	
2019	100	Nisha	Tamil		
2019	Tenali Ramakrishna BA. BL	Rukmini	Telugu		
2022	Maha	Maha	Tamil	50th Film	
2023	Partner	Female Kalyan / Unnamed woman	Tamil	Dual role	
2023	My Name Is Shruthi	Shruthi	Telugu		
2024	105 Minuttess	Jaanu	Telugu		
2024	Guardian	Aparna	Tamil		

=== Television ===
List of television shows and roles
Year	Title	Role	Language	Notes
2001	Shaka Laka Boom Boom	Karuna / Shona		
2001–2003	Des Mein Niklla Hoga Chand	Tina	Hindi	
2002	Kyunki Saas Bhi Kabhi Bahu Thi	Baavri Virani	Hindi	
2002	Son Pari	Sweety	Hindi	
2003	Karishma Kaa Karishma	Teena	Hindi	
2004	Zameen Se Aassman Tak		Hindi	
2004–2005	Hum 2 Hain Na	Kareena / Koel	Hindi	
2005	Celebrity Fame Gurukul	Herself (contestant)	Hindi	
2010	Sapna Babul Ka...Bidaai	Chief Guest	Hindi	
2023	Hansika's Love Shaadi Drama	Herself	English	
2023	MY3	Mythri/ Manimegalai	Tamil	Disney+ Hotstar
2024	Dhee Celebrity Special 2	Judge	Telugu	
2026	Gully	TBA	Telugu	Amazon Prime Video; Upcoming

=== Music videos ===
List of music videos
Year	Title	Singer(s)	Language	Label	Ref.
2007	Ishq Na Karna	Agam Kumar Nigam and Tulsi Kumar	Hindi	T-Series	
2021	Booty Shake	Tony Kakkar and Sonu Kakkar	Hindi	Desi Music Factory	
2021	Mazaa	B Praak	Hindi	Saregama	
2022	Shreaam Pagal	Sunidhi Chauhan	Punjabi	YRF	

== Awards and nominations ==
Year	Award	Category	Work	Result	Ref.
2003	Indian Telly Awards	Best Child Artiste – Female	Des Mein Niklla Hoga Chand	Won	
2008	53rd Filmfare Awards	Best Female Debut	Aap Kaa Surroor	Nominated	
2008	55th Filmfare Awards South	Best Female Debut – South	Desamuduru	Won	
2012	1st South Indian International Movie Awards	Best Actress – Telugu	Kandireega	Nominated	
2012	1st South Indian International Movie Awards	Actress – Special Appreciation (Telugu)	Kandireega	Won	
2012	1st South Indian International Movie Awards	Best Female Debut – Tamil	Mappillai	Won	
2012	1st South Indian International Movie Awards	Best Actress – Tamil	Engeyum Kadhal	Nominated	
2013	2nd South Indian International Movie Awards	Best Actress – Tamil	Oru Kal Oru Kannadi	Won	
2013	60th Filmfare Awards South	Best Actress – Telugu	Denikaina Ready	Nominated	
2014	3rd South Indian International Movie Awards	Best Actress – Tamil	Theeya Velai Seiyyanum Kumaru	Nominated	
2015	4th South Indian International Movie Awards	Best Actress – Tamil	Aranmanai	Won	
2018	7th South Indian International Movie Awards	Style Icon of the Year	—N/a	Won	
2022	10th South Indian International Movie Awards	Decade of Excellence in South Indian Cinema	—N/a	Won	

== See also ==
- List of Indian film actresses
- List of Tamil film actresses
