= Pattampoochi (2022 film) =

2022 film by Badri

- Theatrical release poster
- Directed by: Badri
- Written by: Badri
- Screenplay by: Naru Narayanan; Mahaakerthi Aravindraj
- Produced by: Khushbu
- Starring: Sundar C Jai; Honey Rose
- Cinematography: E. Krishnasamy
- Edited by: Fenny Oliver
- Music by: Navneeth Sundar
- Production company: Avni Cinemax
- Release date: 24 June 2022
- Country: India
- Language: Tamil

Pattampoochi (transl. Butterfly) is a 2022 Indian Tamil-language psychological crime thriller film written and directed by Badri, produced by Khushbu Sundar, under the banner of Avni Cinemax. The film stars Sundar C and Jai in the lead roles, alongside Honey Rose, Imman Annachi and Manasvi Kottachi. The film was released on 24 June 2022.

== Plot ==
The film is a violent cat-and-mouse game between Inspector Kumaran, who has PTSD, and Sudhakar an ultra-violent cannibalistic serial killer.

The flim is set to happen in 1989. Vijayalakshmi aka Viji, (Honey Rose) a reporter working in Vikatan visits a death row inmate Sudhakar who has Tourette syndrome (Jai) whom last wish is to meet Vijayalakshmi because she was the one who is covering the report about a mysterious, artistic serial killer Pattampoochi. Sudhakar is arrested for murdering Ismayil but he confess he isn't the killer and the actual killer is on loose. Vijayalakshmi dismisses his claim as false drama to stop the death sentence but to her schock he reveals that he hasn't committ Ismayil murder but he has committed 7 other murder and claims that he is Pattampoochi and hands over a butterfly drawing to her similar to one that found near the victim deadbodies. He also says he doesn't want to die for just one murder and wanted to dies as a man who committed 7 murders to satisfy his psychotic pleasure. Confused Viji takes the drawing and verifies that he is the real Serial killer Pattampoochi. The preceding morning news about Sudhakar alias Pattampoochi flashes in newspaper causing widespread confusion and the family members of the victims file case in the court to stop Sudhakar's death penalty. The court stops the death penalty orders Police to investigate into it and file report within 30 days and if proven Sudhakar is Pattampoochi, the murder of Ismayil should be re-investigated.

The case is handed over to Inspector Kumaran (Sundar C), who is also a close friend of constable Fernandaz (Imman Annachi and his mentally challenged daughter Roseline (Manasi Kottachi). Kumaran has PTSD because of death of his daughter and wife. He requests for a desk job to take care of his old father but his SP assures him that job if he finishes this case. Media criticize police that they have appointed Incompetent police Kumaran to investigate a high-profile serial killer which Sudhakar reads and doesn't cooperate with Kumaran citing him as Police not worthy to investigate him and will only confess everything to Viji and on the condition that his news should be published on first page of news paper. In the flashback it is revealed that Sudhakar's father is a wealthy and arrogant man who is violently abusive towards him and his mother and always physically abuses him citing his Torus syndrome. Moreover, Sudhakar is sexually abused by his own father. Seeing this unable to help her son, his mother commits suicide in front of his own eyes. He grow up in this abusive environment and he uses Painting as a cope up mechanism to escape trauma. Due to his disability, his paintings are abnormal and is disliked by everyone. Upon a heated argument where Sudhakar's father verbally abuse him saying he is fit for nothing rather than to be a sex toy he brutally kills him. Seeing the blood his hand shaking stops and he feels rejuvenated and paints the dead body hence he beings his killing spree. He also confess that he ate his father's corpse by cooking it.

At present Sudhakar challenges Kumaran to find the similarities in the murder. As per law, the news of any case that is still under hearing should not be published. So Kumaran arranges for a fake news paper carrying Pattampoochi serial killing as first page to be published in news paper that is printed only for the jail and also deduces that he killed the people who have supportive and loving Fathers.

In the meantime Viji develops good bond with both Kumaran and his father. Kumaran's father reveals that Kumaran's daughter was killed in a car bomb blast that was set by an illicit liquor dealer to kill Kumaran. Unable to bear the death of her daughter, His wife commits suicide pushing Kumaran to PTSD whenever he sees fire or hear Siren's sound. Kumaran discovers Viji is a divorce and lives alone with her daughter. Therefore, Kumaran's father without Kumaran's knowledge, asks Viji to marry Kumaran.

Now that Kumaran won the challenge, Sudhakar accepts to cooperate with him and says he will show the murder weapon and mode of operation once Kumaran takes him to the place where Sudhakar commits his crimes. Reluctant to agree upon his demand, Kumaran sets up an illegal drama and takes him to the Sudhakar's place. On the way, they are attacked by the Victims' family. Kumaran saves him and brings him back to jail. The next morning to Kumaran's schock, another murder has been committed in Pattampoochi name. It is then revealed that Sudhakar has manipulated Kumaran to take him out of the jail to commit a murder. Police conseals a secret about serial killings that a strand of hair was not present in Victims' body. They conceal that incase if any copycat killer arises, they use this hair strand thing to confirm it is a copy cat killing. Sudhakar kills the person who really committed Ismayil murder and also takes his hair strand with him allowing police to confirm that it was a murder by Pattampoochi. However Kumar confess to SP that he illegally took him out of the jail. Angered SP, unable to do anything hides the fact from press media and court fearing the risk of loss of job for those who helped Kumaran. In the court hearing, Sudhakar says to judges that he made Pattampoochi drama only to escape death sentence and he is not real Pattampoochi. Hearing this court releases Sudhakar citing that Police couldn't gather enough evidence and his disability wouldn't allow him to commit Ismayil murder.

Kumaran understands that it's all Sudhakar's game to get released. He cleverly manipulates Viji and Kumaran and used them for getting out of the jail and kill a person. Now that court judgement says Sudhakar is not Pattampoochi, (saying he couldn't have committed a new murder when he was inside jail), he can do as much as murder he wants and will neither be arrested nor punished and Police will never touch him because of Kumaran's illegal action of taking Sudhakar out of jail.

The second half starts from here ensuing Cat and mouse game between Sudhakar and Kumaran. Kumaran who is guilty and feels responsible for any murder Sudhakar commits hereafter. But SP transfers Kumaran to a desk job. He says to Fernandez that only when Sudhakar gets angry, he will do mistake and can get evidence to arrest him. Thinking of which, Fernandez shames Sudhakar in front of everyone at the police station and makes him to wash dirty bathroom inside the police station. Later Sudhakar, kills Fernandez

Enraged Kumaran beats Sudhakar and says that he is only suitable to be a sex toy to his father. Triggered Sudhakar, kills Kumarans dog, Tony, and also plans to kill Viji (who now developed love for Kumaran) and Kumaran's father. After a prolonged and thrilling cat and mouse game, Kumaran kills Sudhakar and frames that Real Pattampoochi has killed Sudhakar in anger that he used his name to get released from Jail.

In post climax scene, both Viji and Kumaran are married and lives happily with Viji's daughter. But Pattampoochi serial killings continues but to everyone's surprise he kills criminals. Viji is confused about this and later funds out that Kumaran took the identity of Pattampoochi to kill heartless Criminals.

== Cast ==
- Sundar C as Inspector Kumaran
- Jai as Sudhakar aka Pattampoochi, Psycho killer
- Honey Rose as Vijayalakshmi, journalist
- Imman Annachi as Fernandez
- Ajit Koshy as Sudhakar's father
- Manasvi Kottachi as Roseline, Fernandez's daughter
- Leo Sivadass as Revenger, Victim's brother

== Production ==
The project was announced in December 2020, with Sundar C revealing that he would work with Badri on a film, where Jai would portray the antagonist. The film was shot at regular intervals throughout 2021, with several scenes shot in Pondicherry.

== Reception ==
The film was released on 24 June 2022. A critic from Times of India called it "a loud, violent serial killer film", while The Hindu noted it was "a silly psycho-thriller that banks majorly on shock value". The New Indian Express stated it was "a gore-fest that loses fizz". A critic from Dina Thanthi stated that " Sundar C as a police officer. perfect Majestic in the fight scenes as if he had earned the title of a man. Throws Jai away easily. The scenes where he chases Jai, make you sit on the edge of your seat." Dinamalar critic gave 2.75 rating out of 5
