= Aranmanai 2 =

2016 film by Sundar C

- Theatrical release poster
- Directed by: Sundar C
- Written by: Venkat Raghavan; Sundar C
- Screenplay by: Sundar C; S.B.Ramadoss
- Produced by: Khushbu Sundar
- Starring: Sundar C; Siddharth; Trisha Krishnan; Hansika Motwani; Poonam Bajwa
- Cinematography: U. K. Senthil Kumar
- Edited by: N. B. Srikanth
- Music by: Hiphop Tamizha
- Production company: Avni Cinemax
- Distributed by: Sri Thenandal Films
- Release date: 29 January 2016
- Running time: 136 minutes
- Country: India
- Language: Tamil

Aranmanai 2 (transl. Palace 2) is a 2016 Indian Tamil-language comedy horror film directed by Sundar C. Produced by Avni Cinemax, it is the second instalment in the Aranmanai film series following Aranmanai (2014). The film features an ensemble cast including Sundar, Siddharth, Trisha Krishnan, Hansika Motwani and Poonam Bajwa. In the film, a man and his fiancée return to his ancestral home after his father gets in a coma under mysterious circumstances but takes a turn when he uncovers his family's dark secrets. The film was released on 29 January 2016 and received mixed reviews from critics but became a hit at the box-office.

== Plot ==
The movie starts with the Amman statue that guarded the village against evil spirits and negative energy stored in an underground room during the temple's renovation. At a graveyard close to the temple, a group of tantric practitioners capitalise on the dormant Amman to awaken evil spirits for black magic purposes. During the ritual, they inadvertently release a demonic entity that they could not contain. The evil spirit leaves the graveyard as a cloud and moves into the village. The village mendicant-holy man notices the evil spirit and chases after it but cannot prevent it from entering the titular palace. The palace owner ignored his pleadings since the holy man was mute. Later that night, the spirit attacks the owner, who then falls and goes into a coma. His elder son, Ramesh, arrives with his wife, Sandhya, and their son, Suresh. Together with them are his younger brother, Murali and his fiancée Anitha. Devadas also appears in disguise as his father, Sandhu Bondu Naadimuthu, a doctor, and had contact with the landowners.

One night, a mysterious being kills the family driver. After a few nights, Suresh does crazy things and says that a spirit is telling him to do so. Also, Murali sees a supernatural being elevating his father above the bed and gets scared. Anitha, who also witnesses these things, calls her brother Ravi. One night, Ravi sees Suresh drowning and rescues him. Initially, he suspects Manju, a nurse that the family got to care for Murali's father, but she has a different agenda, so he realises it isn't her. After that, he sets up cameras around the house. A few nights later, the elder brother goes missing, and Ravi sees it. With the cameras, he can identify the spirit that is causing havoc. Murali identifies her as Maya, his younger sister.

Past: The family loved Maya, especially her father and Murali. She was also the owner of Maya Granites, as shown in the song Maya Maya. On the day before her marriage, she eloped with one of the workers' son, and the whole family was shocked and felt disgraced. Murali passes the good news to his father and brother when he sees Maya pregnant three years later in Bangalore. Their father asks Maya to come back home, to which she agrees. On the day she was supposed to arrive, Maya didn't appear, and Murali thought she had changed her mind. Later, Ravi says that it's not true. Maya and her husband got off a stop earlier since her elder brother wanted them to arrive home safely. While travelling in a Jeep on the way to their palace, the driver stabbed Maya's husband. After that, he instructed Maya to go into hiding. But this plan failed when Maya's father arrived and told her to drink poison since she disgraced her family's name and status by marrying someone who belonged to a lower caste. Maya agrees to her father's words with the condition that her brothers should spare her husband's life. After she drank the poison, Maya's elder brother killed her husband in front of her, which made Maya vow that she would end the male generation in her family before her father choked her to death.

Present: Ravi also says that her primary target is Murali since he told their father and elder brother about her whereabouts and Suresh. Manju says that her uncle is a priest and lives near the Kerala border. Ravi goes with Manju to the priest, whose disciples at first refuse to offer a helping hand because the priest is just recuperating from myocardial infarction (heart attack). But before they leave, the priest decides to help them and starts the pooja. After a few moments, the priest informs that Maya has possessed someone in the palace and gives them a lime. The lime turns bad and reveals that Anitha is possessed. Also, Anitha killed Murali's elder brother and poisoned her father-in-law as an act of revenge, even though he managed to recover from his coma. Ravi decides to find Maya's corpse, while Murali, Suresh, and Manju try to distract Anitha by taking the entire family to a restaurant. Their main goal is to get Anitha's blood and put some holy ink on her hair. They manage to get her blood when she is cutting an apple, and one of the assistants manages to put the ink before getting thrashed by Anitha/Maya. There, Anitha goes to the house and tries to kill Murali and Suresh. However, it fails, and the priest manages to get Maya out of Anitha.

Later, Ravi and the priest decide to kill the spirit, and the only way is to be possessed by the spirit and stab its own corpse. Ravi manages to do it and completes it, but the priest gets chest pain and tells Murali that their only hope is to go to the Mariamman Pooja, which is happening in their village temple, as the goddess is their final hope. Murali and Suresh get there with Ravi, possessed by Maya, trying to stop them. When Ravi is about to kill Murali, Mariamman uses her powers and prevents Maya's spirit from killing Murali and Suresh. Before she leaves, she sees her brother Murali, who sheds tears for what had happened to his beloved sister. Before Maya disappears, she smiles at Mariamman's massive idol. After this incident, Murali, Suresh and Anitha reunite, and Ravi reunites with Manju, leaving the Aranmanai in the hands of the caretakers. As everyone leaves the palace, Maya's spirit enters a doll and returns to the palace, waiting for the right time to swing back into action. The movie ends with a hint of a sequel.

== Cast ==
- Sundar C as Ravi
- Siddharth as Murali
- Trisha Krishnan as Anitha, Murali's fiancée, Ravi's younger sister (Voice dubbed by Krithika Nelson)
- Hansika Motwani as Maya, Murali's younger sister (Voice dubbed by Renuka Kathir)
- Poonam Bajwa as Manju, a nurse, Ravi's love interest
- Soori as Devadas and Sandhu Bondhu Naadimuthu, Devadas's father
- Kovai Sarala as Komalam, Sandhu Bondhu Naadimuthu's ex-lover, a servant
- Manobala as Vera Shekar, Komalam's brother, a servant
- Vinodhini Vaidyanathan as Sandhya, Ramesh's wife
- Nithin Manivannan as Suresh, Ramesh's son
- Radha Ravi as Maya's father
- Subbu Panchu as Ramesh, Murali's eldest brother
- Raj Kapoor as a driver
- Chitra Lakshmanan as Ravi's father
- Sanika Raghawa as Ravi's relative
- V. I. S. Jayapalan as Namboothiri, Manju's uncle
- Dhindukal Saravanan as Devadas's assistant
- Thalapathy Dinesh as Namboothiri's assistant
- Vichu Vishwanath as Ramakrishnan
- Rahul Thatha as a priest

Cameo appearances

- Vaibhav as Arun, Maya's husband
- Khushbu Sundar in the song "Amma"
- Hiphop Tamizha in the song "Party with the Pei"

== Production ==
The project's progress was first officially revealed after Trisha Krishnan had tweeted her involvement in the sequel and revealed that she would star alongside Siddharth. Hansika Motwani subsequently also announced that she would work in Aranmanai 2. Aadukalam Naren, then known mainly for character roles, was chosen to play an antagonistic role as Sundar felt he was an "underrated" actor and wanted to further explore his acting skills. Principal photography began in mid-June 2015. The film's makers created a 103 feet (31 m) statue of the sleeping goddess Mariamman for a song sequence. Principal photography wrapped by early December.

== Music ==
Aranmanai 2

Soundtrack album by Hiphop Tamizha
- Released: 27 December 2015
- Recorded: 2015
- Genre: Feature film soundtrack
- Length: 22:56
- Language: Tamil
- Label: Think Music
- Producer: Hiphop Tamizha

Hiphop Tamizha chronology
Thani Oruvan (2015)	Aranmanai 2 (2015)	Kathakali (2016)

The film's soundtrack album and background score were composed by Hiphop Tamizha. The music rights were purchased by Think Music. Independent singer Kaushik Krish (who earlier recorded "Kannala Kannala", also composed by Hiphop Tamizha for Thani Oruvan) announced in September 2015 that he was working on a single track from the album, but his name did not appear on the tracklist.

Track listing
No.	Title	Lyrics	Singer(s)	Length
1.	"Party With The Pei"	Hiphop Tamizha	Hiphop Tamizha, Kharesma Ravichandran	3:35
2.	"Maayaa Maayaa"	Vivek	Kailash Kher, Padmalatha	4:20
3.	"Poraadaa Poraadaa"	Hiphop Tamizha	Hiphop Tamizha	3:38
4.	"Kuchi Mittai"	Hiphop Tamizha	Anthony Daasan	4:12
5.	"Amma" (the Amman song)	Piraisoodan	Malathi Lakshman, Hiphop Tamizha, Vishnupriya Ravi, Anthony Daasan	4:40
6.	"Aranmanai 2" (instrumental)		Hiphop Tamizha	2:31
Total length:				22:56

== Release ==
Aranmanai 2 was initially announced to be released in mid-January 2016 during Pongal; however the release date was pushed to 29 January 2016. The film was distributed by Sri Thenandal Films in Tamil Nadu.

== Reception ==
=== Critical response ===
M Suganth of The Times of India rated the film 2.5/5 and wrote "Despite toeing so closely to the original's formula and being equally unpretentious, Aranmanai-2 feels underwhelming. The horror scenes not even remotely scary (though, the visual effects continue to be tacky). The cast and the director seem to be coasting along with a 'people will see this movie no matter what' attitude, and it is this blatant acknowledgement of the film being just a cash grab that is most disappointing". Sify wrote "Sundar C's Aranmanai 2 is a pucca paisa vasool popcorn entertainer, which is packaged with all the commercial trappings like glamour, slapstick comedy and thrilling moments. Set in a familiar milieu, one can easily predict each and every scene and the film will work big time with common man seeking pure time pass entertainment". Silverscreen India wrote, "At a time when a younger generation of filmmakers in Kollywood are coming up with well-made horror films like Maya, Pisaasu and Demonte Colony, Aranmanai 2 looks like a grinch in a hip Bengaluru pub. Out of place and awkward".

=== Box office ===
Director Sundar C stated that despite mixed reviews, Aranmanai 2 surpassed its predecessor financially.

== Future ==
The third instalment titled Aranmanai 3 was released in 2021, and the fourth instalment Aranmanai 4 in 2024.
