= Aranmanai 4 =

2024 film by Sundar C

- Theatrical release poster
- Directed by: Sundar C
- Written by: Sundar C; Venkat Raghavan; S. B. Ramadass
- Produced by: Khushbu Sundar; A. C. Shanmugam; A. C. S. Arun Kumar
- Starring: Sundar C; Tamannaah Bhatia; Raashii Khanna
- Cinematography: E. Krishnasamy
- Edited by: Fenny Oliver
- Music by: Hiphop Tamizha
- Production companies: Avni Cinemax; Benzz Media (P) Ltd
- Release date: 3 May 2024
- Running time: 147 minutes
- Country: India
- Language: Tamil
- Budget: ₹40 crore

Aranmanai 4 (transl. Palace 4) is a 2024 Indian Tamil-language comedy horror film directed by Sundar C. Produced by Avni Cinemax and Benzz Media (P) Ltd, it is the fourth instalment in the Aranmanai film series. Partially reshot in Telugu as Baak, the film features an ensemble cast including Sundar, Tamannaah Bhatia, Raashii Khanna, Santhosh Prathap, Ramachandra Raju, Kovai Sarala, Yogi Babu, VTV Ganesh and Delhi Ganesh. Vennela Kishore and Srinivasa Reddy replace Yogi Babu and VTV Ganesh in the Telugu version. In the film, a lawyer tries to uncover the truth behind the death of his estranged sister, believed to have committed suicide, but realises that there is a malevolent paranormal force involved.

The film was announced in January 2023 with Vijay Sethupathi set to star and Sundar returning as director. Sundar replaced Sethupathi in the lead role following the latter's exit due to scheduling conflicts. Hiphop Tamizha reunited with Sundar to compose the film's score, while E. Krishnasamy and Fenny Oliver handled the cinematography and editing, respectively. Principal photography took place from March to mid-September 2023.

Aranmanai 4 was released by theatrically worldwide on 3 May 2024. The film grossed over ₹100 crore against a budget of ₹40 crore, emerging as the highest-grossing film in the franchise and one of the highest grossing Tamil films of 2024.

== Plot ==
In Assam, a priest and his daughter travel by boat to a temple during a festival. When the daughter is injured and her blood spills into the river, it releases Baak, a shapeshifting demon. Baak kills the daughter and assumes her form. The priest then traps Baak's soul in a vessel, forcing it to take his daughter's place permanently for the sake of his wife. The scene shifts to a village where Selvi and her husband, Santhosh, live with their children, Sakthi and Saravanan Jr. Santhosh dies of a heart attack in the forest, and Selvi apparently hangs herself in their well. Witnessing her deceased mother, Sakthi falls into a coma. Upon hearing of the deaths, Selvi's brother, Saravanan, an advocate, visits the grieving children along with his aunt. In the village, the zamindar's granddaughter, Maaya, a doctor, is assigned to care for Sakthi. Soon, they start experiencing paranormal activities in the house. One day, Maaya encounter a spirit in front of Shakthi's bed, and conveyed this to Saravanan 's aunt, but she tells her to hide this to others for sell the palace, and to build hospital for Maaya, she also agrees for it.

Saravanan suspects that Selvi's death was not a suicide and visits the police station with Ravi, the village president's son. They are dismissed rudely by the inspector. Ravi then shows Saravanan a video of his late brother-in-law being stalked by a swami before his death. Later, while they are in their jeep, a spirit attacks, and Saravanan steps out to investigate. During this, a spirit looking like Selvi attacks Ravi. Hearing Ravi's scream, Saravanan returns to find the jeep and Ravi gone, with only the video camera left behind, showing footage of the swami once again. The next morning, Saravanan finds the jeep smashed against a tree with Ravi's corpse on top. Initially suspected by the police, Saravanan clears his name using the video camera evidence. The police, now convinced, help Saravanan search for the swami's lair, where they find photographs of all the recent victims Selvi, Santhosh, Ravi, and Sakthi. Convinced of the swami's guilt, the inspector orders his capture.

Saravanan finds out that Sakthi, the inspector, and the late Ravi all share the same birthdate. He confirms with Maaya that all three also have a red mole in common and tells her to protect the children. Saravanan confronts the swami to save the inspector. Meanwhile, the Assamese priest arrives at Saravanan's home, claiming he is looking for his missing daughter. He tries to approach Sakthi but is expelled by Selvi's spirit. Concurrently, the inspector dies after being impaled by a vel, and Sakthi wakes up from her coma, accompanied by Selvi's spirit. During interrogation, the swami reveals that Baak, an evil spirit capable of living in water and on land, had its soul trapped by the priest, diminishing its power. Baak followed the villagers when they relocated to the village, eventually recovering its hidden soul. To regain full strength, Baak aims to sacrifice Sakthi, the inspector, and Ravi. Baak killed Selvi's husband and took his form to approach Sakthi. Selvi, however, sacrificed herself to protect her children and returned as a spirit to guard them against Baak. The swami warns Saravanan to protect Sakthi at all costs to prevent Baak from becoming immortal.

Saravanan confides in his aunt about his regrets for not supporting her. Meanwhile, Baak attacks the police station, causing injuries, but the swami manages to drive him away. During this chaos, Maaya is stopped by Selvi's spirit at the compound gate while trying to attend Sakthi's birthday party. Saravanan notices a bloodstain on Maaya's lab coat, which Selvi's spirit seems to be pointing at. Upon testing the blood in the lab, they discover that Baak has been impersonating the swami after killing him outside the police station. After confronting the president, they find the swami's dead body in the trunk of the president's car. The president reveals that the swami had gone to the graveyard to destroy Selvi's spirit and her remains. Saravanan arrives too late, witnessing his sister's spirit disappear while pleading for Sakthi's safety. Baak then reappears to claim Sakthi, but Maaya flees with her to the temple festival. There, Saravanan battles Baak inside a large Asura sculpture. At the festival's climax, the goddess destroys both the sculpture and Baak.

With the turmoil resolved, Saravanan assures Maaya that the palace will be converted into a hospital so she can continue serving the village. Outside, the children play throwball with their mother's spirit, showing that she continues to watch over them.

== Cast ==
- Sundar C as Lawyer Saravanan
- Tamannaah Bhatia as Selvi, Saravanan's younger sister (Voice dubbed by M. M. Manasi)
- Raashii Khanna as Dr. Maaya, Zamindar's granddaughter (Voice dubbed by Smruthi K)
- Santhosh Prathap as Santhosh, Selvi's husband
- Ramachandra Raju as the swami
- Kovai Sarala as Saravanan's aunt
- Yogi Babu as a mason
- VTV Ganesh as the carpenter
- Delhi Ganesh as the zamindar, Maaya's grandfather
- Jayaprakash as Varatha Rajan SV, village president
- Fredrick Jhonson as Ravi, Varatha Rajan's son
- Rajendran as Rathnam
- Singampuli as Constable A. Shakthivel
- Deva Nandha as Shakthi, Selvi's daughter
- Sanjay as Saravanan, Selvi's son
- Lollu Sabha Seshu as the zamindar's servant
- Vichu Vishwanath as the money lender
- Rupam Baruah as the priest
- Namo Narayana as K. Duraipandi
- Jayashri Chaki as Selvi, Duraipandi's daughter
- Harsha Harish as the priest’s daughter

Telugu version

- Vennela Kishore as a mason
- Srinivasa Reddy as a carpenter

Cameo appearance

- K. S. Ravikumar as DSP S. Jagadheesan
- Khushbu Sundar in the song "Amman"
- Simran in the song "Amman"

== Production ==
In mid-January 2023, Vijay Sethupathi was cast as the lead in the fourth instalment of the Aranmanai film series, helmed by Sundar C. However, due to scheduling conflicts, Sethupathi stepped down, and Sundar took over the lead role. Later in March 2023 Raashii Khanna and Tamannaah Bhatia were chosen as the lead actresses, both are marking their second collaboration with Sundar, for Khanna after Aranmanai 3 (2021), Bhatia after Action (2019). In the Telugu partially reshot version Baak, Vennela Kishore and Srinivasa Reddy were cast instead of Yogi Babu and VTV Ganesh. Additionally, Sundar reunited with the musical duo Hiphop Tamizha for the project. Sundar revealed that he was inspired by Assamese folklore when scripting the film.

Principal photography commenced in March 2023 and wrapped by mid-September. The Central Board of Film Certification (CBFC) issued Aranmanai 4 a U/A certificate with a single alteration, resulting in a duration of 147.22 minutes. In contrast, Baak received the same certificate with three alterations and a duration of 150.07 minutes.

== Music ==
Aranmanai 4

Soundtrack album by Hiphop Tamizha
- Released: 2 May 2024
- Recorded: March–September 2023
- Genre: Feature film soundtrack
- Length: 16:33
- Language: Tamil
- Label: Think Music
- Producer: Hiphop Tamizha

Hiphop Tamizha chronology
Veeran (2023)	Aranmanai 4 (2024)	PT Sir (2024)

Singles from Aranmanai 4
- 1. "Achacho" Released: 14 April 2024; 2. "Jo Jo" Released: 29 April 2024

External audio
- Aranmanai 4 Audio Jukebox on YouTube

The film's soundtrack album and background score were composed by Hiphop Tamizha in his sixth collaboration with Sundar C, after Aambala (2015), Aranmanai 2 (2016), Kalakalappu 2 (2018), Vantha Rajavathaan Varuven (2019) and Action (2019). The music rights were purchased by Think Music. The first single, titled "Achacho" was released on 14 April 2024. The second single, titled "Jo Jo" was released on 29 April 2024. The Tamil album featuring 5 tracks and Telugu album featuring 4 tracks were released on 2 May 2024 along with the film.

Tamil
No.	Title	Lyrics	Singer(s)	Length
1.	"Achacho"	Vignesh Srikanth	Kharesma Ravichandran, Srinisha Jayaseelan	3:13
2.	"Jo Jo"	Ko Sesha	Meenakshi Ilayaraja	3:26
3.	"Amman"	Muthamil	Aruna Ravindran, V. M. Mahalingam	4:41
4.	"Oyile Oyile"	Ko Sesha	Kaushik Krish, Snigdha Chandra	2:38
5.	"Ghost Theme"		Hiphop Tamizha	2:35
Total length:				16:33

Telugu
No.	Title	Lyrics	Singer(s)	Length
1.	"Panchuko"	Raghavi	Sahithi	3:09
2.	"Jo Jo"	Bharathi Babu	Saindhavi	3:24
3.	"Amma"	Sahithi	Kavitha Gopi, Deepak Blue	4:39
4.	"Ghost Theme"		Hiphop Tamizha	2:35
Total length:				13:47

== Marketing ==
Exclusive stills of the film were leaked and became viral on the internet on 15 March 2024. The official trailer was released on 30 March 2024, with a trailer launch event held in Chennai.

== Release ==
=== Theatrical ===
Aranmanai 4 was initially scheduled for a worldwide theatrical release in mid-January 2024 during the Pongal week but was postponed to Republic Day, 26 January. Later, it was pushed to 11 April, then to 26 April, and finally theatrically released worldwide on 3 May 2024, alongside Baak. The Hindi version was released on 31 May 2024.

=== Distribution ===
Aranmanai 4 was distributed as Baak in Andhra Pradesh and Telangana by Asian Suresh Entertainment LLP. It was distributed in Hindi by Baweja Studios and Kaarmic Films.

=== Home media ===
Disney+ Hotstar acquired the digital rights to Aranmanai 4 in Tamil, Telugu, Malayalam, and Kannada, and it began streaming on the platform on 21 June 2024.

== Reception ==
=== Critical response ===
Gopinath Rajendran of The Hindu wrote, "Sundar C makes a much-needed comeback with the most intriguing addition to the ‘Aranmanai’ franchise, thanks to an engaging plot headlined by Tamannaah". M. Suganth of The Times of India gave the film 2.5/5 stars and mentioned, "A predictable, forgettable, and mildly entertaining rehash", while noting the film's adherence to a proven formula. He criticised the film for its lack of imagination and originality, suggesting that it does little more than tread the same ground as earlier entries in the series. Manigandan KR of Times Now gave the film 3.5/5 stars and stated, "Sundar C’s horror-comedy makes you both shudder and laugh", praising the film for delivering a mix of thrills and entertainment. While praising Tamannaah's acting, he notes that although the film follows the established formula of its predecessors, it still offers a fresh narrative with multiple mysteries to unravel.

Janani K. of India Today rated the film 2/5 stars, commenting, "Negatives overpower positives in Sundar C’s horror-comedy, which is full of redundant ideas and little laughs." She points out that the film's few strengths are overshadowed by redundant ideas and a lack of genuine laughs, resulting in a tedious experience for the viewer. The Indian Express gave a dismal 1/5 stars, stating, "A new day and a new 'Aranmanai' film with the same old problems; another lackluster entry that fails to provide either thrills or chills." The review expresses disappointment in the film's writing and accuses it of laziness, suggesting that the franchise has become too reliant on a formulaic approach. Latha Srinivasan of Hindustan Times said the film is "timepass and if you go in with no expectations, you will not come out raving about the film but you won’t come out bitterly disappointed either".

Akshay Kumar from The New Indian Express gave the film 3 out of 5 stars, stating, "An in-form Sundar C finds the sweet spot between humour and horror". He credited the film's success to Sundar C's direction, noting its effective comedy, emotional depth, and music by Hiphop Tamizha. He particularly commended Tamannaah's performance for elevating the entertainment value. News18 wrote, "Sundar C’s gripping storyline makes it a must-watch", and praised him for delivering a blend of horror and comedy, featuring engaging performances by the leads. They also noted that the direction stands out, while the music and cinematography play minor roles, the VFX impresses. The Economic Times wrote, "The director's skillful storytelling and ability to blend horror with comedy have been praised, with many considering this installment a refreshing addition to the franchise." They also highlighted Bhatia's exceptional performance in emotional and flashback sequences.

=== Box office ===
Aranmanai 4 collected ₹50 crore worldwide in its first week and reached ₹75 crore by the end of the second week. The film grossed ₹100.50 crore at the box office during its theatrical run.

== Accolades ==
Aranmanai 4 received 5 nominations in and 1 win in Edison Awards as Best Entertaining Film of 2024, and also earned 5 nominations and 1 win in Ananda Vikatan Cinema Awards.

Year	Award	Category	Recipient(s)	Result	Ref.
2025	Behindwoods Gold Hall Of Fame	Best Actress In A Lead Role	Raashii Khanna	Won	
2025	Behindwoods Gold Hall Of Fame	Most Popular Singers Of The Year	Kharesma Ravichandran & Srinisha Jayaseelan (for "Achacho")	Won	
2025	Edison Awards South	Favourite Actress – Tamil	Raashii Khanna	Nominated	
2025	Edison Awards South	Favourite Actress – Tamil	Tamannaah Bhatia	Nominated	
2025	Edison Awards South	Best Comedian – Male	Yogi Babu	Nominated	
2025	Edison Awards South	Best Dance Choreographer	Kala Master (for "Achacho")	Nominated	
2025	Edison Awards South	Best Entertainer Of The Year	Sundar C.	Won	
2025	Ananda Vikatan Cinema Awards	Best Entertaining Film	Sundar C.	Won	
2025	Ananda Vikatan Cinema Awards	Best Comedian Actor – Male	Yogi Babu	Nominated	
2025	Ananda Vikatan Cinema Awards	Best Playback Singer – Female	Meenakshi Ilayaraaja (for ''Jo Jo'')	Nominated	
2025	Ananda Vikatan Cinema Awards	Best Music Director (songs)	Hiphop Tamizha	Nominated	
2025	Ananda Vikatan Cinema Awards	Best Animation and Visual Effects	Azhagu Raj Pandian & Rangarajan	Nominated	
2025	Ananda Vikatan Cinema Awards	Best Choreography	Kala Master for ("Achacho")	Nominated	
2025	Blacksheep Cine Awards	Favourite Comedian – Male	Yogi Babu	Won	
2025	South Indian International Movie Awards	Best Comedian – Tamil	Yogi Babu	Nominated	
