= Sundar C =

Indian politician, actor and film director (born 1968)

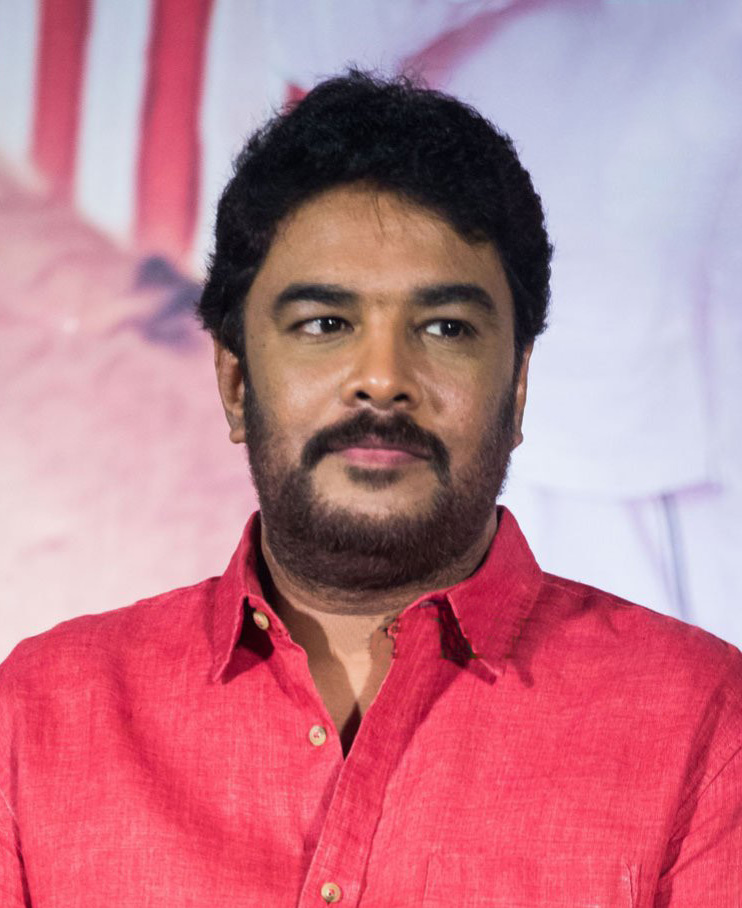
- Sundar at Muthina Kathirika Audio Launch
- Born: Sundaravel Chidambaram; 21 January 1968 (age 58); Erode, Coimbatore district, Tamil Nadu, India
- Occupations: Actor; Film director; Screenwriter; Playback singer; Film producer; Politician
- Years active: 1990–present
- Political party: Puthiya Needhi Katchi (2026–present)
- Spouse: Khushbu Sundar (m. 2000)
- Children: 2
- Awards: Kalaimamani

Sundaravel Chidambaram (born 21 January 1968), known professionally as Sundar C, is an Indian politician, actor, filmmaker, and playback singer who predominantly works in Tamil cinema. In 2026, Sundar C was an unsuccessful candidate from the Madurai Central constituency in the Tamil Nadu Legislative Assembly election.

He has directed over 37 films and received the Kalaimamani award. He is one of the most popular and commercial filmmakers in Tamil cinema.He has introduced Arun Vijay, Rambha, RJ Balaji, Malavika, Ankitha, Anushka Shetty, Aishwarya Lekshmi and Malavika Sharma as debutants and for debut to Tamil cinema respectively Hiphop Tamizha and K. Rajasekhar as music director & fight master respectively.

His notable films include Ullathai Allitha (1996), Arunachalam (1997), Unnai Thedi (1999), Anbe Sivam (2003), Winner (2003), Giri (2004), Kalakalappu (2012), Theeya Velai Seiyyanum Kumaru (2013), Aranmanai Cinematic Universe (2014-2024) and Madha Gaja Raja (2025).

Alongside his wife, he produced the television series Nandhini (2017-2018), Maya (2018) and Jothi (2021). His film production credits include Hello Naan Pei Pesuren (2016), Meesaya Murukku (2017), Natpe Thunai (2019), Naan Sirithal (2020), Naanga Romba Busy (2020) and Pattampoochi (2022).

== Early life ==
Sundar was born on 21 January 1968 in Erode, Tamil Nadu. His parents are Chidambaram Pillai and Deivanai Ammal, both of whom are respected in the Tamil community. On his father's recommendation, he adopted the name "Sundar C" to better suit the film industry.

== Career ==
Sundar began his career as an assistant director to Manivannan and made his directorial debut with the film Murai Maman in 1995. Initially, he intended to cast a leading action hero Sarathkumar for the lead role, but due to the producer's inability to secure the actor, Jayaram was selected instead, capitalizing on his comedic prowess. The film was a success at the box office. Sundar then continued to focus on comedy films, directing Ullathai Allitha (1996), Mettukudi (1996) and Unakkaga Ellam Unakkaga (1999), all starring Karthik. In 1997, he directed the high-profile Arunachalam, with Rajinikanth. The film won three Tamil Nadu State Film Awards, including Best Film.

Sundar started the new millennium by directing the thriller Unnai Kann Theduthey (2000) and the action film Rishi (2001). In 2003, he directed both Anbe Sivam and Winner. While Winner was commercially successful, Anbe Sivam—despite being critically acclaimed—underperformed at the box office but later became a cult classic. He continued his directorial ventures with Chinna (2005) and Rendu (2006). Subsequently, Sundar transitioned to acting, making his lead debut in the commercially successful Thalai Nagaram (2006). He continued to secure lead roles in hits like Veerappu (2007), directed by Badri, and Sandai (2008) by Sakthi Chidambaram. He received the Kalaimamani award from the Government of Tamil Nadu in 2009. He then made a directorial comeback with Nagaram Marupakkam in 2010.

In 2012, Sundar directed the comedy film Kalakalappu, which was a commercial hit. He followed it up with Theeya Velai Seiyyanum Kumaru (2013), Aranmanai (2014), Aranmanai 2 (2016), and Kalakalappu 2 (2018). He starred in the well-received horror thriller Iruttu (2019), directed by V. Z. Durai, and also directed Vishal's action film Action (2019). His subsequent release as a director and actor, Aranmanai 3 (2021), was successful at the box office despite being critically panned. He later starred in Thalai Nagaram 2 (2023). Later, he directed and starred in Aranmanai 4 (2024).

In 2018, Sundar C was named in the "Tamil Leaks" social media campaign by Telugu actress Sri Reddy, who alleged that he and an executive producer named Ganesh had demanded sexual favours in exchange for a lead role during the Hyderabad schedule of the film Aranmanai. Sundar C categorically denied these claims, stating he had never met the actress and dismissing the allegations as false and defamatory. He subsequently announced his intention to initiate legal proceedings and file a defamation case against her. Reddy later provided a clarification, noting that while she had been introduced to the director on set and found him polite, the pressure for "compromise" primarily came from the executive producer, and she remained uncertain if Sundar C was directly aware of those specific arrangements.

== Personal life ==
In 2000, Sundar married actress Khushbu. After their marriage, she took his name as her surname and became known as Khushbu Sundar. They have two daughters, Avantika and Anandita, after whom they named their production house, Avni Cinemax.

== Political career ==
In 2026, Sundar C was announced as a candidate from the Madurai Central Assembly constituency in the 2026 Tamil Nadu Legislative Assembly election. He is contesting on behalf of the Puthiya Needhi Katchi (PNK), a party founded by A. C. Shanmugam, as part of the AIADMK-led Alliance in Tamil Nadu, which is aligned with the National Democratic Alliance.

== Electoral performance ==
Tamil Nadu Legislative elections
Elections	Constituency	Party	Result	% Votes
2026 Tamil Nadu Legislative Assembly election	Madurai Central	ADMK	Lost	22.57%

== Filmmaking style ==
Sundar C is known for directing populist films intending to achieve mass appeal. Due to his back-to-back commercial success for more than 30 years, he is considered among the most popular "commercial" filmmakers in modern Tamil cinema. Comedy is the genre Sundar is best known for directing frequently, and he has mentioned Madhan's cartoons, Crazy Mohan and S. Ve. Shekher's plays as influences. Sundar claims to avoid vulgarity and pointless glamour in his films, which has drawn sceptism among viewers and critics. Acknowledging that his films may not always be well received by critics, he contends he is not discouraged by such criticism; he believes critics might be ostracised from intellectual circles if they positively review his films, which are intended for general audiences seeking entertainment, rather than intellectuals. He has, however, expressed sadness that he does not get the appreciation he deserves.

== Filmography ==
=== Films ===
Key
†	Denotes films that have not yet been released

==== As actor ====
Sundar C film acting credits
Year	Title	Role	Notes	Ref.
1990	Vaazhkai Chakkaram	Constable	Cameo	
1993	Moondravadhu Kann	Studio assistant	Cameo	
1995	Murai Maman	Villager	Cameo	
1997	Arunachalam	Reporter	Cameo	
2006	Thalai Nagaram	Subramaniam "Right"	Lead debut	
2007	Veerappu	Pulippandi		
2008	Sandai	Kathiresan "Kaththi"		
2008	Aayudham Seivom	Saidai Sathya		
2009	Perumal	Perumal		
2009	Thee	ACP Sarathy "Samy"		
2009	Aiyantham Padai	Prabhakaran		
2010	Guru Sishyan	Eeti		
2010	Vaada	Vetrivel		
2010	Nagaram Marupakkam	Selvam		
2012	Murattu Kaalai	Kaalaiyan		
2014	Ninaithathu Yaaro	Himself	Cameo	
2014	Aranmanai	Lawyer Ravi		
2016	Aranmanai 2	Ravi		
2016	Muthina Kathirikai	Muthupandi		
2017	Meesaya Murukku	Himself	Cameo; also producer	
2019	Action	Passer-by	Cameo	
2019	Iruttu	Inspector Chezhiyan		
2021	Aranmanai 3	Ravi		
2022	Pattampoochi	Inspector Kumaran		
2023	Thalainagaram 2	Right		
2024	Aranmanai 4	Lawyer Saravanan		
2025	Vallan	Inspector Divakar		
2025	Gangers	Saravanan		
2026	Meesaya Murukku 2	Himself	Cameo; also producer	
TBA	One 2 One †	TBA	Filming	

==== As director ====
Sundar C film directing and writing credits
Year	Title	Notes	Ref.
1995	Murai Maman		
1995	Murai Mappillai		
1996	Ullathai Allitha		
1996	Mettukudi		
1997	Arunachalam		
1997	Janakiraman		
1998	Naam Iruvar Namakku Iruvar		
1999	Unnai Thedi		
1999	Suyamvaram	Directed by 14 directors	
1999	Unakkaga Ellam Unakkaga		
1999	Azhagarsamy		
2000	Kannan Varuvaan		
2000	Unnai Kann Theduthey		
2001	Ullam Kollai Poguthae		
2001	Rishi		
2001	Azhagana Naatkal		
2003	Anbe Sivam		
2003	Winner		
2004	Giri		
2005	London		
2005	Thaka Thimi Tha		
2005	Chinna		
2006	Rendu		
2010	Nagaram Marupakkam		
2012	Kalakalappu	25th Film	
2013	Theeya Velai Seiyyanum Kumaru	Partially reshot in Telugu as Something Something	
2014	Aranmanai		
2015	Aambala		
2016	Aranmanai 2		
2018	Kalakalappu 2		
2019	Vantha Rajavathaan Varuven		
2019	Action		
2021	Aranmanai 3		
2022	Coffee with Kadhal		
2024	Aranmanai 4	Partially reshot in Telugu as Baak	
2025	Madha Gaja Raja	Delayed release, Filmed in 2012	
2025	Gangers		
2026	Mookuthi Amman 2		
2027	Purushan †	Filming	

==== As singer ====
Sundar C film singing credits
Year	Title	Song	Composer	Notes	Ref.
2008	Sandai	"Vaadee En Kappakezhungu"	Dhina	Debut	
2010	Guru Sishyan	"Subaiya Subaiya"	Dhina	Sung with Sathyaraj	

==== As producer ====
Sundar C film producer credits
Year	Title	Director	Notes	Ref.
2016	Aranmanai 2	Himself	Co-producer	
2016	Hello Naan Pei Pesuren	S. Bhaskar		
2017	Meesaya Murukku	Hiphop Tamizha		
2019	Natpe Thunai	D. Parthiban Desingu		
2020	Naan Sirithal	Raana		
2020	Naanga Romba Busy	Badri		
2021	Aranmanai 3	Himself	Co-producer	
2022	Pattampoochi	Badri		
2024	Aranmanai 4	Himself	Co-producer	
2025	Gangers	Himself	Co-producer	
2026	Meesaya Murukku 2	Hiphop Tamizha	Co-producer	
2026	Mookuthi Amman 2 †	Himself	Co-producer	
2027	Purushan †	Himself	Co-producer	

== Television ==
Sundar C television credits
Year	Serial	Credited as		Network	Language	Ref.
Year	Serial	Writer	Producer	Network	Language	Ref.
2017–2018	Nandhini	✓	✓	Sun TV; Udaya TV	Tamil; Kannada	
2018	Maya	✓	✓	Sun TV	Tamil	
2018 –2020	Lakshmi Stores	✓	✗	Sun TV; Gemini TV	Tamil; Telugu	
2021	Jothi	✓	✓	Sun TV	Tamil	

== Awards and nominations ==
Year	Award	Category	Work	Result	Ref.
1996	Filmfare Awards South	Best Director	Ullathai Allitha	Nominated	
1996	Filmfare Awards South	Best Director	Arunachalam	Nominated	
1997	Tami Nadu State Film Awards	Best Film	Arunachalam	Won	
2009	Kalaimamani Award	—N/a	—N/a	Won	
2015	9th Vijay Awards	Favourite Director	Aranmanai	Nominated	
2025	17th Edison Awards Tamil	Best Entertainer Of The Year	Aranmanai 4	Won	
2025	Ananda Vikatan Cinema Awards	Best Entertaining Film	Aranmanai 4	Won	
