= List of Tamil films of 1999 =

Post-amendment to the Tamil Nadu Entertainments Tax Act 1939 on 1 August 1998, Gross fell to 130 per cent of Nett Commercial Taxes Department disclosed ₹86 crore in entertainment tax revenue for the year.

== Films ==
A list of films produced in the Tamil film industry in India in 1999 by release date:

=== January — March ===
Opening		Title	Director	Cast	Studio	Ref
J A N	12	The Terrorist	Santosh Sivan	Ayesha Dharker, Krishna	Indian Image Productions	
J A N	14	Suriya Paarvai	Jagan	Arjun, Pooja Priyanka	Modooril Creations	
J A N	15	Aathavan	Bharath Krishna	Poovarasan, Madhavi, Desingh Raja	James Bond Productions	
J A N	15	Mannavaru Chinnavaru	P. N. Ramachandra Rao	Sivaji Ganesan, Arjun, Soundarya	M.Y.M.Creations	
J A N	15	House Full	Parthiban	Parthiban, Vikram, Suvalakshmi	Bioscope Film Framers	
J A N	15	Maya	Rama Narayanan	Napoleon, Nagma	Sri Thenandal Films	
J A N	15	Ponnu Veetukkaran	P. Vasu	Sathyaraj, Preetha	Ganga Gowri Productions	
J A N	15	Thodarum	Ramesh Khanna	Ajith Kumar, Devayani, Heera Rajagopal	Sree Devi Movie Makers	
J A N	29	Thullatha Manamum Thullum	Ezhil	Vijay, Simran	Super Good Films	
F E B	5	Kallazhagar	Bharathi	Vijayakanth, Laila	Pangaj Productions	
F E B	5	Ninaivirukkum Varai	K. Subash	Prabhu Deva, Keerthi Reddy, Ranjith	Thaaraas Creations	
F E B	5	Unnai Thedi	Sundar C	Ajith Kumar, Malavika	Lakshmi Movie Makers	
F E B	12	Chinna Raja	Chitra Lakshmanan	Karthik, Roja, Priya Raman	Gayathri Films	
F E B	26	Adutha Kattam	Sarath	Raja Ravindra, Yuvarani	Ajmal Movie Makers	
F E B	26	En Swasa Kaatre	K. S. Ravi	Arvind Swamy, Isha Koppikar, Prakash Raj	Nigaaba Films International	
M A R	4	Ethirum Puthirum	V. C. Ramani	Mammooty, Napoleon, Sangita	Madhu Films International	
M A R	5	Endrendrum Kadhal	Manoj Bhatnagar	Vijay, Rambha	Sameera Films	
M A R	6	Ullathai Killathe	Vejey Kannan	Suresh, Khushbu, Karan, Supraja	Vijaya Cine Enterprises	
M A R	12	Chinna Durai	R. Chandra	Sarath Kumar, Roja	KB Films	
M A R	19	Poo Vaasam	Sree Bharathi	Murali, Pushpalatha	RVR Pictures	
M A R	26	Annan	Anu Mohan	Ramarajan, Swathi	Simon Pictures	

=== April — June ===
Opening		Title	Director	Cast	Studio	Ref
A P R	10	Padayappa	K. S. Ravikumar	Rajinikanth, Soundarya, Ramya Krishnan, Sivaji Ganesan	Arunachala Cine Creations	
A P R	12	Monisha En Monalisa	T. Rajendar	Ramankanth, Mumtaj, T. Rajendar	Chimbu Cine Arts	
A P R	14	Periyanna	S. A. Chandrasekhar	Vijayakanth, Meena, Suriya, Manasa	Jaya Subha Sree Productions	
A P R	16	Aasai Alaigal	S. Manikandan	Bhuvanesh, Ramya	Sakthi Productions	
A P R	23	Or Iravu	Bose	Sanjay, Ashwin	VIP Films Productions	
A P R	30	Nilave Mugam Kaattu	Kalanjiyam	Karthik, Devayani, Ramki	Mahalakshmi International	
A P R	30	Poomagal Oorvalam	Rasu Madhuravan	Prashanth, Rambha	Super Good Films	
A P R	30	Poomaname Vaa	V. Azhagappan	Ramarajan, Sangita	Nalini Cini Arts	
M A Y	1	Vaalee	S. J. Surya	Ajith Kumar, Simran, Vivek, Jyothika	NIC Arts	
M A Y	1	Rajasthan	R. K. Selvamani	Sarath Kumar, Vijayashanti	Paanjajanyam	
M A Y	7	Annan Thangachi	Charan Raj	Charan Raj, Ajay Krishna, Shruti	Om Sree Vinayaga Films	
M A Y	21	Kummi Paattu	Kasthuri Raja	Prabhu, Devayani	Kasthuri Manga Creations	
M A Y	27	Anantha Poongatre	Raj Kapoor	Ajith Kumar, Karthik, Meena, Malavika	Roja Combines	
M A Y	28	Miss Shakeela	K. Alexander	Shakeela, Udayaprakash, Rajkumar	Sri Devi Cini Movies Combines	
J U N	4	Guest House	Raj Mohan	Babu Ganesh, Sangeetha	Kalaiaruvi Combines	
J U N	25	Nenjinile	S. A. Chandrasekhar	Vijay, Isha Koppikar	V. V. Creations	
J U N	25	Oruvan	Suresh Krishna	Sarath Kumar, Pooja Batra, Devayani	Lakshmi Movie Makers	

=== July — September ===
Opening		Title	Director	Cast	Studio	Ref
J U L	9	Kadhalar Dhinam	Kathir	Kunal, Sonali Bendre	Sri Surya Movies	
J U L	16	Anthahpuram	Krishna Vamsi	Parthiban, Soundarya, Prakash Raj	Duet Cinema	
J U L	16	Sangamam	Suresh Krishna	Rahman, Vindhya	Pyramid Films International	
J U L	16	Suyamvaram	Ten Directors	Prabhu Deva, Karthik, Sathyaraj, Arjun	LS Movies	
J U L	16	Viralukketha Veekkam	V. Sekhar	Livingston, Khushbu, Vivek, Vadivelu	Thiruvalluvar Kalaikoodam	
J U L	30	Rojavanam	Selva	Karthik, Laila, Malavika	Kavithalayaa	
A U G	6	Kanave Kalayadhe	V. Gowthaman	Murali, Simran	Sivasakthi Movie Makers	
A U G	6	Malabar Police	P. Vasu	Sathyaraj, Khushbu, Abbas, Mumtaj	Kamalam Movies	
A U G	6	Ponvizha	Ashokan	Napoleon, Suvalakshmi	Siva Sree Pictures	
A U G	6	Poovellam Kettuppar	Vasanth	Suriya, Jyothika	P. A. Art Productions	
A U G	13	Kannodu Kanbathellam	Prabhu Solomon	Arjun, Sonali Bendre, Suchindra, Ruchita Prasad	Anbalaya Films	
A U G	14	Nee Varuvai Ena	Rajakumaran	Parthiban, Devayani, Ajith Kumar	Super Good Films	
A U G	15	Amarkkalam	Saran	Ajith Kumar, Shalini, Raghuvaran	Venkateswaralayam	
S E P	9	Minsara Kanna	K. S. Ravikumar	Vijay, Monica Castelino, Rambha, Khushbu	KRG Movies International	
S E P	9	Jodi	Praveen Gandhi	Prashanth, Simran	Sony Orient	
S E P	17	Anbulla Kadhalukku	Mohan	Mohan, Megha, Bhavana, Sangeetha	Parthee International	
S E P	17	Kaama	Ashok Kumar	Vishal, Sunila, Urvashi, Deepti Bhatnagar	Teja Creations	
S E P	17	Pooparika Varugirom	A. Venkatesh	Sivaji Ganesan, Ajay, Malavika	Aishwarya Film Makers	
S E P	24	Unakkaga Ellam Unakkaga	Sundar C	Karthik, Rambha	Lakshmi Movie Makers	

=== October — December ===
Opening		Title	Director	Cast	Studio	Ref
O C T	1	Manaivikku Mariyadhai	V. C. Guhanathan	Pandiarajan, Khushbu	Sri Thenandal Films	
O C T	1	Mugam	Gnana Rajasekaran	Nassar, Roja	Subramaniya Films	
O C T	1	Nesam Pudhusu	Karthik Vel	Ranjith, Priya Raman	Sivasankaraalaya	
O C T	1	Pombalainga Samacharam	Vinay Raj	Ravi, Kokila	Navaneetham Combines	
O C T	7	Maravathe Kanmaniye	N. S. Madhavan	Vineeth, Karan, Reshma, Ravali	Maha Creations	
O C T	7	Suryodayam	L. V. Aadhavan	Vijayashanti, Rahman	Rani Creative Visions	
O C T	15	Jayam	Ravi Raja	Mansoor Ali Khan, Sangita, Ishaq Hussaini	Mahalakshmi Cini Circuit	
N O V	7	Hello	K. Selva Bharathy	Prashanth, Preeti Jhangiani, Sujitha	Cherin Movie Makers	
N O V	7	Kanmani Unakkaga	Ravi Raja	Ishaq Hussaini, Suvalakshmi	I International	
N O V	7	Kannupada Poguthaiya	Bharathi Ganesh	Vijayakanth, Simran, Karan	Super Good Films	
N O V	7	Maanaseega Kadhal	B. S. Raman	Hamsavardhan, Sushva	Sai Baba Creations	
N O V	7	Mudhalvan	Shankar	Arjun, Manisha Koirala, Raghuvaran, Laila	S Films	
N O V	7	Ooty	Anwar	Murali, Roja	Nigaaba Films International	
N O V	7	Pudhu Kudithanam	Raghuvasan	Vignesh, Mantra	Azhvaarammaal Movie Makers	
N O V	7	Taj Mahal	Bharathiraja	Manoj Bharathiraja, Riya Sen, Revathi, Radhika	Janani Art Creations	
N O V	18	Iraniyan	Vincent Selva	Murali, Meena, Raghuvaran	Thaaraas Creations	
N O V	21	Sundari Neeyum Sundaran Naanum	A. N. Rajagopal	Pandiarajan, Easwari Rao, Ranjith	Guru Meena Films	
N O V	26	Kudumba Sangili	P. N. Ramachandra Rao	Kalaipuli G. Sekaran, Khushbu	Sree Durga Cini Arts	
N O V	26	Sivan	Velu Prabhakaran	Napoleon, Arunpandian, Radhika	VJ Films	
D E C	3	Thirupathi Ezhumalai Venkatesa	Rama Narayanan	Prabhu, Roja, S. Ve. Sekhar, Vadivelu	Sri Thenandal Films	
D E C	3	Time	Geetha Krishna	Prabhu Deva, Simran, Radhika Chaudhari	Lifeline Films	
D E C	3	Unnaruge Naan Irundhal	Selva	Parthiban, Meena, Rambha	Lakshmi Movie Makers	
D E C	10	Azhagarsamy	Sundar C	Sathyaraj, Roja	Malar Combines	
D E C	10	Mudhal Etcharikkai	Devar	Ponnambalam, Vichithra	AA Cini Circuit	
D E C	10	Sethu	Bala	Vikram, Abitha, Sivakumar, Sriman	Sharma Productions	
D E C	17	Aasaiyil Oru Kaditham	Selva	Prashanth, Kausalya, Anand	Udhaya Arts	
D E C	17	Manam Virumbuthe Unnai	M. Sivachandran	Prabhu, Meena, Rajiv Krishna, Karan	SSK Films	
D E C	17	Paattali	K. S. Ravikumar	Sarath Kumar, Devayani, Ramya Krishnan	Roja Combines	
D E C	17	Vaaliba Mayakkam	Kumar	Sudhir, Mini	Harishkumar Films	
D E C	24	Thaayae Varuga	N. P. Logan	Rajesh, Devi, Sri	Yoga Cinema & Co	

== Awards ==
Category/Organization	Cinema Express Awards 31 January 2000	Dinakaran Cinema Awards 13 February 2000	Filmfare Awards South 22 April 2000	Tamil Nadu State Film Awards 29 December 2000
Best Film	Sethu	Padayappa	Sethu	Padayappa
Best Director	Vikraman; Vaanathaippola (2000)	Shankar; Mudhalvan	Bala; Sethu	Bala; Sethu
Best Actor	Ajith Kumar; Amarkkalam / Vaalee	Ajith Kumar; Vaalee	Ajith Kumar; Vaalee	Rajinikanth; Padayappa
Best Actress	Simran; Vaalee	Simran; Thullatha Manamum Thullum / Vaalee	Ramya Krishnan; Padayappa	Simran; Thullatha Manamum Thullum
Best Music Director	Deva; Vaalee	A. R. Rahman; Kadhalar Dhinam / Mudhalvan	A. R. Rahman; Mudhalvan	A. R. Rahman; Sangamam
