= Muthu (soundtrack) =

1995 soundtrack album by A. R. Rahman

Soundtrack album by A. R. Rahman
- Released: 8 October 1995
- Recorded: 1995
- Venue: Panchathan Record Inn
- Genre: Film soundtrack
- Language: Tamil
- Labels: Pyramid; Star Music; Aditya Music

A. R. Rahman chronology
Rangeela (1995)	Muthu (1995)	Love Birds (1995)

Muthu is the soundtrack album composed by A. R. Rahman for the 1995 Tamil-language film of the same name starring Rajinikanth and directed by K. S. Ravikumar. It is the first film where Rahman, Rajinikanth and Ravikumar worked together. The album has six tracks with lyrics by Vairamuthu. The Hindi version is titled Muthu Maharaja and had lyrics penned by P. K. Mishra, whereas the Telugu version of Muthu is penned by Bhuvana Chandra. Recording of the songs took place at the composer's Panchathan Record Inn studio in Chennai. The soundtrack was released on 8 October 1995 under the Pyramid label. The Telugu version of the soundtrack was released under Aditya Music, and Saregama distributed the Hindi soundtrack.

== Development ==
Ravikumar considered "Thillana Thillana" the song "most difficult to crack". It initially had the lyrics, "Tamizh naatu makkal kootam unnodu dhaane, naan mattum thalli nippena" (transl. All of Tamil Nadu is with you, would I stand far away?) which Ravikumar disliked. Vairamuthu eventually became irritated and said, "Ennanga neen[g]a, thanana thanana thillana thillana-nu" (transl. What man, you are like thanana thanana thillana thillana) catching Ravikumar's attention. He realised it was the hook the song needed, so Vairamuthu wrote "Thillana thillana, nee thithikindra meena". The word "meena" was replaced with "thena" at Ravikumar's suggestion since he had previously written "Meena Ponnu" for Nattamai (1994). The song sampled African humming which had been previously sampled by French group Deep Forest in "Night Bird".

Rahman composed a tune beginning with the gibberish word "kuluvalilae". When it came to writing lyrics, Vairamuthu could not find a substitute word for kuluvalilae that was equally long but made sense. He and Ravikumar wanted Rahman to change the tune slightly to accommodate a better word but realised it was not possible without disturbing the song. As a result, kuluvalilae was kept. Ravikumar recalled, "I just made it seem as though the song was set in this village called Kuluvaele [sic] and put up a road sign indicating that it was the name of the village and then had the song start with the word". The background rhythm and beats of "Kuluvalilae" were borrowed from "Rescue Me" by Fontella Bass. The song includes "Omanathinkal Kidavo", a lullaby composed by Irayimman Thampi.

The concept of "Oruvan Oruvan", a song reflecting philosophies relevant to society through its lyrics, was inspired by "Aandavan Ulagathin Muthalali" from Thozhilali (1964). Ravikumar told Vairamuthu what he wanted the lyrics to portray. The song stresses that "God is above all and that greed will be the end of life". Paravai Muniyamma was originally asked to sing "Kokku Saiva Kokku", but declined, and the song was instead sung by Theni Kunjarammal. It is set in the Carnatic raga known as Kalyani while "Vidukathaiya" is set in Chakravakam. Recording of the songs took place at the composer's Panchathan Record Inn studio in Chennai.

== Track listing ==
Tamil (Muthu)
No.	Title	Singer(s)	Length
1.	"Oruvan Oruvan"	S. P. Balasubrahmanyam	6:25
2.	"Kuluvalilae"	Udit Narayan, K. S. Chithra, Kalyani Menon, G. V. Prakash Kumar	6:13
3.	"Vidukathaiya"	Hariharan	6:19
4.	"Kokku Saiva Kokku"	S. P. Balasubrahmanyam, Theni Kunjarammal, Febi Mani	5:30
5.	"Theme Music" (Instrumental)	—	3:09
6.	"Vidukathaiya" (One Bit)	Hariharan	1:14
7.	"Thillana Thillana"	Mano, Sujatha Mohan, Srinivas	6:32

Hindi (Muthu Maharaja)
No.	Title	Singer(s)	Length
1.	"Uparwala Malik Hai"	S. P. Balasubrahmanyam	6:25
2.	"Phoolwali Ne"	K. S. Chithra, Udit Narayan	6:13
3.	"Koi Samjhade"	S. P. Balasubrahmanyam, Ila Arun	5:30
4.	"Rangeela Rangeela"	Mano, Sujatha Mohan	6:32
5.	"Chhod Chala Nirmohi"	Hariharan	6:19
6.	"Theme Music" (Instrumental)	—	3:09

Telugu (Muthu)
No.	Title	Singer(s)	Length
1.	"Thillana Thillana"	Mano, Sujatha Mohan	6:32
2.	"Kalagalile Prema"	S. P. Balasubrahmanyam, K. S. Chithra	6:13
3.	"Konga Chitti Konga"	S. P. Balasubrahmanyam, Ila Arun	5:30
4.	"Visirinada Vidhi Galam"	Hariharan	6:19
5.	"Okade Okkadu"	S. P. Balasubrahmanyam	6:25
6.	"Theme Music" (Instrumental)	—	3:09

== Release ==
The soundtrack album was released on 8 October 1995 at Kalaivanar Arangam in Madras (now Chennai), where Rajinikanth and Kamal Haasan along with Ravikumar, Rahman and Vairamuthu unveiled the audio cassettes to the public. Over 400,000 cassettes of Muthu's soundtrack were sold on the release date. It was the most popular foreign soundtrack in Japan.

== Reception ==
D. S. Ramanujam of The Hindu appreciated the soundtrack, particularly "Thillana Thillana", "Kuluvalilae" and "Kokku Saiva Kokku". Ananda Vikatan praised the song sequences for their vibrancy. MM of The Indian Express wrote that the music, barring "Oruvan Oruvan", "doesn't stand out. The beat of the songs and the way they are picturised do not somehow jel together".

== Legacy ==
"Thillana Thillana" was adapted by Nadeem–Shravan into "Deewana Deewana" for the 1996 film, Jung. The songs from Muthu were later retained in its Kannada remake in 2004, Sahukara, though Rajesh Ramanath was credited for its music. "Kuluvalilae" was heavily sampled by British singer Teejay Arunasalam for his 2014 song "Thaen Kudikka".

== Bibliography ==
- Dhananjayan, G. (2011). The Best of Tamil Cinema, 1931 to 2010: 1977–2010. Galatta Media. ISBN 978-81-921043-0-0.
- Ramachandran, Naman (2014) [2012]. Rajinikanth: The Definitive Biography. New Delhi: Penguin Books. ISBN 978-0-14-342111-5.
- Sundararaman (2007) [2005]. Raga Chintamani: A Guide to Carnatic Ragas Through Tamil Film Music (2nd ed.). Pichhamal Chintamani. OCLC 295034757.
