= Suyetchai MLA =

- DVD cover
- Directed by: Guru Dhanapal
- Written by: Guru Dhanapal
- Produced by: Stanley P. Rajan; T. M. Varadharajan; A. Abraham Selvakumar; M. G. Karunanidhi
- Starring: Sathyaraj; Goundamani
- Cinematography: D. Shankar
- Edited by: R. Suresh Rajhan
- Music by: Sabesh–Murali
- Production company: Stanwin Creations
- Release date: 5 May 2006
- Running time: 145 minutes
- Country: India
- Language: Tamil

Suyetchai MLA is a 2006 Indian Tamil-language political satire film directed by Guru Dhanapal. The film stars Sathyaraj and Goundamani. The film was released on 5 May 2006 after many delays.

== Plot ==
Nambirajan (Sathyaraj) and Visky (Goundamani) are lorry drivers and best friends. Both of them are very helpful to MLA Arivudaiyan (Nassar) with all his work. Nambirajan's sister Priya (Ammu) loves a rich boy Rakesh (Rakesh). Nambirajan and Rakesh's father Muthiah (Rajan P. Dev) then prepare their engagement. In the function, Muthiah talks ill about Nambirajan's poverty and insults him. Muthiah says that he would wed his son with Nambirajan's sister only when Nambirajan becomes a rich person. He also says that he would wed his daughter (Abitha) to Nambirajan at that time. General elections are announced in the State, and the ruling party refuses to again give seat to Arivudayan. He insults the party district leaders, and decides to contest as Independent candidate.

But Arivudayaan is killed before filing nomination. So, Nambirajan contests in his place, and by luck wins the election by 1% vote, and becomes an MLA. At the same time, the ruling party MKM gets 116 seats, and opposition TKM also gets 116 seats, with one seat's election postponed due to death of candidate. Since, Nambirajan's support can give either party majority in the House, both parties try to pull him into their coalition. TKM succeeds and Nambirajan visits their HQ. He asks their leader Kumaran to give him PWD minister post, and this causes the front runner for that post to threaten to leave the group. Then Nambirajan asks for Kumaran to give up his post in the cabinet, to avoid further issue. Since, Kumaran was posed to become Chief Minister, Nambirajan promises him to serve as rubber stamp CM. In order to fulfill his dream, Kumaran gives up the CM post, and becomes Deputy Chief Minister instead.

Nambirajan starts off to work with clean hands, but the roughness of all politicians forces him to corruption. He earns thousands of crores of black money. When he starts to push Kumaran out of the party, they engage in cold war, resulting in the party siding with Nambirajan and Kumaran being kept as backbench MLA. Kumaran, and MMK leader Nathan then blame corruption charges of Nambirajan. Nambirajan accepts the charges, and forces the court to indict all MLAs including Kumaran and Nathan as accomplices. The Legislature is dissolved, and clean candidates are elected in the new Elections.

== Cast ==
- Sathyaraj as Nambirajan
- Prakash Raj as Ilampirai
- Goundamani as Visky
- V. M. C. Haneefa
- Manthra
- Abitha as Muthiah's daughter
- Thilakan
- Nassar as Arivudaiyan
- Rajan P. Dev as Muthiah
- Ponnambalam
- Delhi Ganesh
- Rakesh as Rakesh
- Besant Ravi
- Shakeela
- Srilekha
- K. P. A. C. Lalitha
- Paravai Muniyamma
- Ammu as Priya
- Anjali Devi
- Brinda Parekh (special appearance in the song "Irungattu Kottai")
- Babilona (special appearance in the song "Irungattu Kottai")

== Production ==
After directing comedy films like Thai Maaman and Maaman Magal, Guru Dhanapal teamed up for the third time with the duo Sathyaraj and Goundamani. Sathyaraj said, "I feel the film will certainly entertain viewers as it will be an out-and-out laugh riot". Guru Dhanapal, said "Sathyaraj gets a maximum mileage of the story with his histrionic and comedy talent". D. Shankar and R. Suresh Rajhan were the cinematographer and editor respectively.

The filming was held at Chennai, Pondicherry, Madurai and Delhi. At the time of release, the LIC Housing Finance took the film to court. The official had stated that Stanley P. Rajan and his associates, who jointly produced the film, had cheated the company of ₹50.39 lakh (equivalent to ₹1.7 crore or US$200,000 in 2023). According to him, Stanley P. Rajan had obtained a housing loan of ₹25 lakh (equivalent to ₹85 lakh or US$100,000 in 2023) by submitting fake address and false particulars in his application. His associates too applied for and availed themselves of the loan using a similar modus operandi. After obtaining the housing loans, they diverted the sum for film production without using for building houses.

== Soundtrack ==
Suyetchai MLA

Soundtrack album by Sabesh–Murali
- Released: 2006
- Recorded: 2004
- Genre: Feature film soundtrack
- Length: 12:46
- Producer: Sabesh–Murali

Sabesh–Murali chronology
Thavamai Thavamirundhu (2005)	Suyetchai MLA (2006)	Imsai Arasan 23am Pulikesi (2006)

The film score and the soundtrack were composed by Sabesh–Murali. The soundtrack, released in 2004, features 3 tracks with lyrics written by Gangai Amaran.

Song	Singer(s)	Duration
"Irungattu Kottai"	Manikka Vinayagam, Kavitha Gopi	4:13
"Mera Mera Mera Ooru"	Kavitha Gopi	4:19
"Puli Varuthu Puli Varuthu"	Mahathi	4:14

== Reception ==
Malini Mannath of Chennai Online wrote "It's no doubt a scenario repeated from earlier Satyaraj films. But what keeps this film going is the fairly neatly packaged script, a steady paced narration, the cheeky lines, the real life comparisons, and the inimitable style of Satyaraj, all of which keep the audience engaged despite the distractions".
