= Love Birds (1996 film) =

1996 film by P. Vasu

- Title card
- Directed by: P. Vasu
- Written by: P. Vasu
- Based on: Ratha Sapthami
- Produced by: Pyramid Natarajan
- Starring: Prabhu Deva; Nagma
- Cinematography: M. C. Sekar
- Edited by: P. Mohanraj
- Music by: A. R. Rahman
- Production company: Pyramid Films
- Release date: 15 January 1996
- Running time: 160 minutes
- Country: India
- Language: Tamil

Love Birds is a 1996 Indian Tamil-language romantic drama film directed by P. Vasu. The film stars Prabhu Deva and Nagma with Raja. The film's score and soundtrack were composed by A. R. Rahman and was highly successful. The film was released on 15 January 1996 and had an below average performance commercially. It is a remake of the 1986 Kannada film Ratha Sapthami for which Vasu was the co-screenwriter.

== Plot ==
Mridula and Arun fall in love while studying in the college owned by Mridula's (single) father, a wealthy man. Arun, however, comes from a poor family with a single mother and younger sister. As a favour to Arun, Mridula's father arranges for Arun's sister to get married and pays for her wedding expenses. After the wedding, Arun and Mridula have a car accident and Mridula wakes up from a long coma only to be told by her father that Arun died in the accident. A devastated Mridula is unable to get over his absence, and her father is advised by her doctors to bring her to a place where Arun's memories will not plague her. Her father takes her to London to stay in his friend's house. Before long, Mridula sees Arun in strange visions. Meanwhile, Mridula's father arranges for her to marry his friend's son Mano, a young man attracted to her. Unable to accept this arrangement, she flees to London Town where she meets David, who looks exactly like Arun. She follows him and learns where he lives and works. Whenever she tries to talk to him, he denies his relationship with her and says he doesn't know her. However, she later discovers that her father, unable to accept a poor man to become his son-in-law, had used the fact that he had helped with Arun's sister's marriage as a reason for Arun to return the favour by forgetting his daughter. So Arun had moved to London and changed his name in an attempt to forget about Mridula's. But after meeting and talking with Mridula several times, he reveals this. When Mridula's father becomes aware, he hires thugs to kill him but Arun escapes. In the end, after being advised by his friend and Mano, and seeing his distraught daughter, he realises his mistake and arranges for the couple to reunite.

== Cast ==
- Prabhu Deva as Arun/David
- Nagma as Mridula
- Vijayakumar as Rathnakumar
- Sarath Babu as Prakash
- Manorama as Susheela
- Raja as Mano
- Vadivelu as Raja
- Vennira Aadai Moorthy as Professor
- Santhana Bharathi as College principal
- Raviraj as Professor
- Chinni Jayanth as Arun's friend
- Delhi Ganesh as Ramalingam
- Veera Pandiyan as Student
- H. Ramakrishnan as Susheela's husband
- LIC Narasimhan as Raghupathy
- Dhamu as Dhamu, Arun's friend
- Meena Kumari as Sheela, Arun's sister
- Vittal Rao as Vittal
- Apache Indian in a special appearance
- P. Vasu in a cameo appearance
- Vijay Sethupathi (uncredited) as an audience member at the cultural competition

== Production ==
Prabhu Deva was signed to work on the film after working in Shankar's 1994 hit Kaadhalan, and his pair from that film, Nagma, was also signed on. British Indian musician Apache Indian was also signed on to sing and dance for a music video in the film.

The film was predominantly shot across London, with scenes also canned at Buckingham Palace and at a Hilton Hotel. The producers had earlier location scouted in the city and took music director, A. R. Rahman along to get a feel of the city.

Initially, actress Sridevi was signed to work on the film but eventually walked off due to family commitments.

== Soundtrack ==
Love Birds

Soundtrack album by A. R. Rahman
- Released: November 1995
- Recorded: 1995
- Studio: Panchathan Record Inn; Chennai, India
- Genre: Feature film soundtrack
- Label: Pyramid Audio; Aditya Music; PolyGram
- Producer: A. R. Rahman

A. R. Rahman chronology
Muthu (1995)	Love Birds (1995)	Indian (1996)

The soundtrack was composed by A. R. Rahman, with lyrics by Vairamuthu for the original Tamil version, by Sirivennela Seetharama Sastry for the Telugu version and by P. K. Mishra and Mehboob for the Hindi version. The song "Malargaley" is set to the raga Hamir Kalyani.

=== Track listing ===
All lyrics are written by Vairamuthu.

Tamil (Original)
No.	Title	Singer(s)	Length
1.	"Come On Come On"	Mano	5:17
2.	"Malargaley"	K. S. Chithra, Hariharan	7:15
3.	"Naalai Ulagam"	Unnikrishnan, Sujatha Mohan	7:26
4.	"No Problem"	Apache Indian, A. R. Rahman	6:11
5.	"Samba Samba"	Aslam Mustafa	5:28
Total length:			31:40

Hindi (Dubbed)
No.	Title	Lyrics	Singer(s)	Length
1.	"Come On Come On"	P. K. Mishra	Udit Narayan	5:21
2.	"Milgaye Milgaye"	Mehboob	K. S. Chitra, Hariharan	7:16
3.	"Na Ho Kal Jab"	P.K. Mishra	S. P. Balasubrahmanyam, Sujatha Mohan	7:27
4.	"No Problem"	Mehboob	Apache Indian, A. R. Rahman	6:16
5.	"Samba Samba"	P.K. Mishra	Aslam Mustafa	5:33
Total length:				31:54

All lyrics are written by Sirivennela Seetharama Sastry.

Telugu (Dubbed)
No.	Title	Singer(s)	Length
1.	"Come On Come On"	Mano	5:17
2.	"Manasuga Manasuga"	K. S. Chitra, Hariharan	7:09
3.	"Repe Lokam"	Unnikrishnan, Sujatha Mohan	7:25
4.	"No Problem"	Apache Indian, A. R. Rahman	6:10
5.	"Samba Samba"	Aslam Mustafa	5:32
Total length:			31:34

== Release and reception ==
The film opened in January 1996. The film opened days earlier in Malaysia than India and was shown across 27 theatres in the country, a figure only usually exceeded for Tamil films starring Rajinikanth, and this mirrors the large release the film received. K. Vijiyan of New Straits Times gave a positive review saying, "This movie seems made for courting couples, especially those who are facing problems with disapproving parents" and added that "strong dialogue makes the film rise slight above the ordinary". Kalki was more critical, calling it yet another blowback for Prabhu Deva. The Hindu wrote "To bank on the Kathalan team of Prabhu Deva and Nagma to deliver the goods without a powerful story to back their effort has cost Pyramid Films International, the makers of Love Birds, dearly despite shooting most part of the second half in England. Experienced director P. Vasu has written the story, dialogue, screenplay and somehow he is not able to infuse his usual sentiment oriented touches because the scope is very minimal in the plot" but praised Rahman's music and Sekar's cinematography. Love Birds became an average grosser at the box office but was a little better than Prabhu Deva's next, Mr. Romeo. The actor thus had to go through a slump in his film career.
