= Guru Dhanapal =

Indian film director

- Born: 2 March 1959
- Died: 18 April 2014 (aged 55); Coimbatore, Tamil Nadu, India
- Occupations: Film director, screenwriter
- Years active: 1991–2007

Guru Dhanapal (2 March 1959 – 18 April 2014) was an Indian film director, who worked in Tamil cinema, mostly with actor Sathyaraj and Karthik (actor).

== Career ==
Guru Dhanapal made his directorial debut with Unna Nenachen Pattu Padichen (1992) starring Karthik, Sasikala, and Monisha in leading roles. In the 1990s, the director made a series of film starring Sathyaraj in the lead role, achieving box office success with Thai Maaman (1994) after which he made Maaman Magal (1995) and Periya Manushan (1997). The three films were described as "routine comedy masala ventures" and were filmed in very quick schedules. In between he collaborated with Jayaram twice in Periya Idathu Mappillai (1997) and Raja Magal, which did not release, as well as directing a portion of Suyamvaram (1999), which featured an ensemble cast of actors from the Tamil film industry. A further project titled Vanthanga Jeyichanga launched in 1998 with Sathyaraj and Meena, failed to materialise. Likewise, he began working on Yen Vizhiyil Nee Irunthaal featuring Karthik and Suvaluxmi in 2000, but the film was later shelved.

His final venture was the much-delayed Sathyaraj starrer Suyetchai MLA in 2006.

== Filmography ==
Year	Title	Notes
1992	Unna Nenachen Pattu Padichen	
1994	Thai Maaman	
1995	Maaman Magal	
1997	Periya Idathu Mappillai	Remake of Malayalam hit Aniyan Bava Chetan Bava
1997	Periya Manushan	
1999	Suyamvaram	
2006	Suyetchai MLA	

== Death ==
Guru Dhanapal died on 18 April 2014 at the age of 55 in Coimbatore after being admitted to hospital due to a massive heart attack.
