= Vichithra =

Indian actress

Vichitra
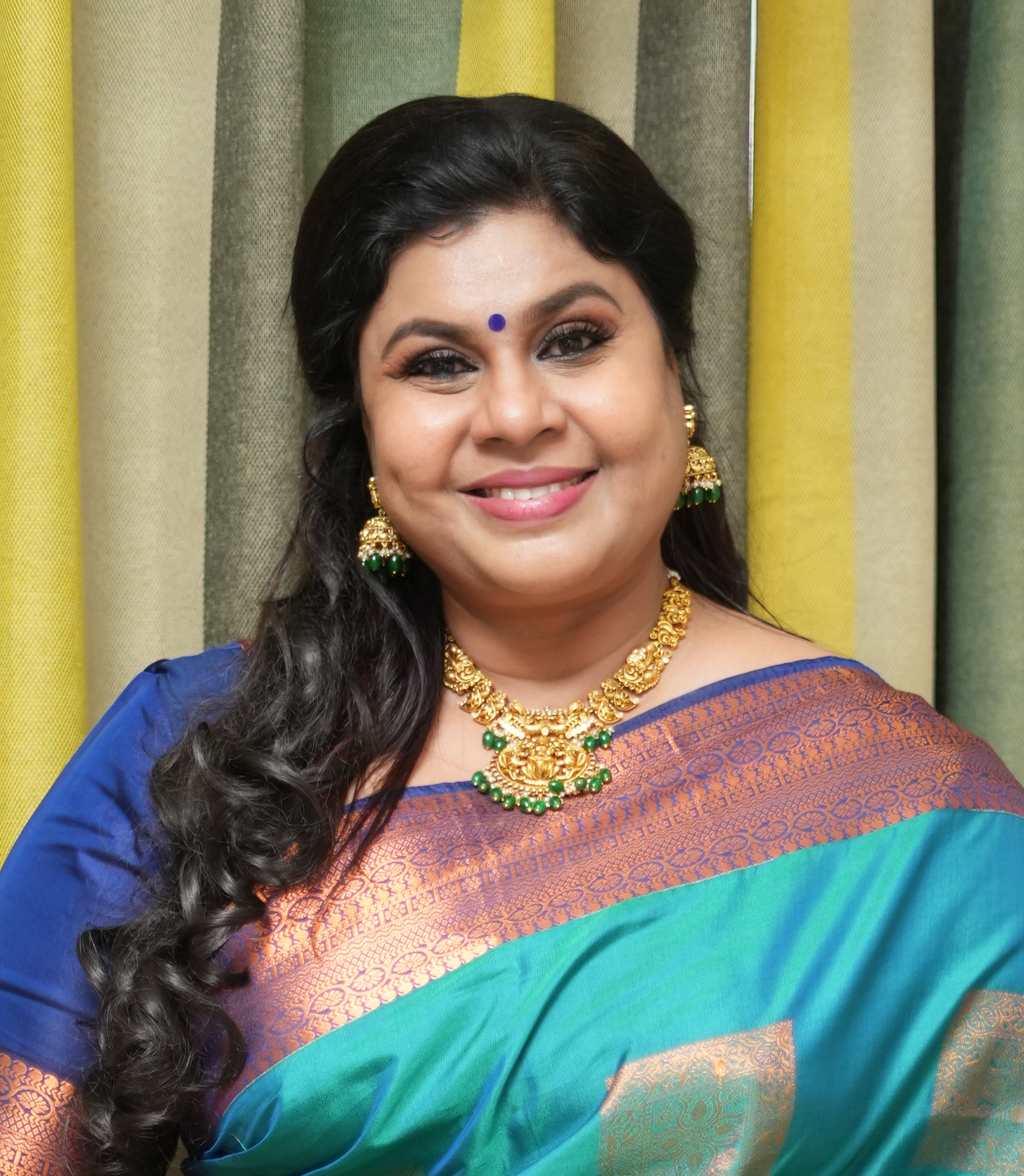
- Vichitra at an event
- Occupation: Actress
- Years active: 1991–present
- Known for: Cooku with Comali; Bigg Boss Season 7

Vichitra is an Indian actress who has predominantly appeared in Tamil-language films. She has also appeared in a few Malayalam, Telugu and Kannada films.

== Career ==
Her breakthrough came in the form of a glamorous role in Selva's Thalaivasal (1992). She has appeared in supporting roles, notably in Rasigan (1994), Muthu (1995) and Suyamvaram (1999). She briefly forayed into a career in television, playing a leading role in the drama Maami Chinna Maami. She has settled in Pune after marriage and has retired from films however she still remained active in television.

== Personal life ==
She is the daughter of actor Williams and Mary Vasantha (Vijaya), and has two sisters and a brother. Her father was murdered during a robbery incident in September 2011.

== Filmography ==
=== Tamil films ===
Year	Title	Role	Notes
1991	Thalapathi	Padma’s daughter	
1992	Chinna Thayee	Ponnamma	
1992	Thalaivasal	"Madippu" Hamsa	
1992	Aavarampoo		
1993	Amaravathi		Special appearance
1993	Enga Muthalali	Kaveri	
1993	Jaathi Malli	Savitri	
1993	Rajathi Raja Raja..		Special appearance
1993	Athma		Special appearance
1993	Madhumathi		
1993	Sabash Babu		
1994	Rasigan	Chandrika Rani	
1994	Ravanan	Sundari	
1994	Duet		
1994	Mani Rathnam		Special appearance
1994	Vandicholai Chinraasu		Special appearance
1994	Veera		Special appearance
1995	Muthu	Rathidevi	
1995	Muthu Kulikka Vaarieyala	Minnalkodi	
1995	Villadhi Villain	Amsavalli	
1995	Asuran	Balamani	
1995	Seethanam	Sarasu	
1995	Ragasiya Police	Ezhilarasi	
1995	Periya Kudumbam	Pappamma	
1995	Thotta Chinungi	Monica	
1996	Mappillai Manasu Poopola	Ganga	
1996	Rajali		
1996	Selva	Jyothi	
1997	Aravindhan		Special appearance
1997	Ettupatti Rasa		Special appearance
1997	Sishya		Special appearance
1997	Samrat		Special appearance
1997	Kadhal Palli	Mynaa	
1998	Ponmaanai Thedi		
1998	Ellame En Pondattithaan	Laila Kumari	
1998	Kizhakkum Merkkum	Valli	
1998	Ponnu Velayira Bhoomi		Special appearance
1998	Poonthottam		Special appearance
1998	Harichandra		Special appearance
1999	Thodarum	Radha	
1999	Adutha Kattam		
1999	Mudhal Etcharikkai	Bharathi	
1999	Suyamvaram	Vichithra	
1999	Unakkaga Ellam Unakkaga		
1999	Ponnu Veetukkaran	Diana	
1999	Jayam	Amudha	
1999	Kanmani Unakkaga		
2000	Penngal	Mangalam	
2001	En Iniya Pon Nilavae		
2001	Krishna Krishna	Rukmani	
2001	Seerivarum Kaalai	Rukku	
2024	Joshua: Imai Pol Kaakha	Latha	

=== Other language films ===
Year	Title	Role	Language	Notes
1992	Ezhamedam		Malayalam	
1994	Rudraksham	Dancer	Malayalam	
1995	Pokiri Raja	Chitra	Telugu	
1995	Thirumanassu		Malayalam	
1996	Sukhavasam		Malayalam	
1996	Azhakiya Ravanan		Malayalam	
1997	Shobhanam		Malayalam	
1998	King	Vichithra	Kannada	
1998	Shanti Shanti Shanti		Kannada	Special appearance
2000	Gandharva Rathri		Malayalam	
2000	Pranayatheeram		Malayalam	
2001	Kinavu Pole		Malayalam	
2001	Bhalevadivi Basu	Pushpa	Telugu	
2010	Dasanna		Telugu	

=== Television Serials ===
Year	Title	Role	Channel	Notes
2019–2020	Raasathi	Chintamani	Sun TV	
2022–2023	Karthigai Deepam	Rajashri	Zee Tamil	
2026	Vaagai Sooda Vaa	S. Kalaiyarasi	Zee Tamil	

=== Television shows ===
Year	Title	Role	Channel	Notes	Ref
2023	Cooku with Comali (Season 4)	Contestant	Star Vijay	2nd Runner-up	
2023-2024	Bigg Boss Tamil (Season 7)	Contestant	Star Vijay	Evicted Day 98	
