= Periya Idathu Mappillai =

- Directed by: Guru Dhanapal
- Screenplay by: Guru Dhanapal
- Story by: Rafi–Mecartin
- Produced by: K. Murugan
- Starring: Jayaram; Goundamani; Manivannan; Devayani; Mantra
- Cinematography: R. H. Ashok
- Edited by: P. Sai Suresh
- Music by: Sirpy
- Production company: Murugan Movies
- Release date: 22 August 1997
- Running time: 150 minutes
- Country: India
- Language: Tamil

Periya Idathu Mappillai (transl. Groom from a rich place) is a 1997 Indian Tamil language comedy film directed by Guru Dhanapal. The film stars Jayaram, Goundamani, Manivannan, Devayani and Mantra. It was released on 22 August 1997. The film is a remake of the Malayalam film Aniyan Bava Chetan Bava.

== Plot ==
Periya Thambi and Chinna Thambi are brothers and owners of a company. Gopalakrishnan is from a poor family and despite being a graduate, he cannot find a job. To support his family, he becomes the driver of Periya Thambi and Chinna Thambi. Periya Thambi's daughter Lakshmi and Chinna Thambi's daughter Priya fall in love with Gopalakrishnan. What transpires later forms the crux of the story.

== Cast ==
- Jayaram as Gopalakrishnan
- Goundamani as Kaali
- Manivannan as Manian Gounder
- Devayani as Lakshmi
- Mantra as Priya
- Vijayakumar as Periya Thambi
- Rajan P. Dev as Chinna Thambi
- R. Sundarrajan as Gopalakrishnan's father
- Pandiyan as Pandiyan
- Ponvannan as Chellappa
- Vivek as Ramu
- Halwa Vasu as Vasu
- Kalaignanam as Gopalakrishnan's grandfather
- Chokkalinga Bhagavathar as Gopalakrishnan's great-grandfather
- LIC Narasimhan
- Kalaranjini as Chinnavar's wife
- Vijaya Chandrika as Gopalakrishnan's mother
- Janaki as Gopalakrishnan's grandmother
- Radhabhai as Gopalakrishnan's great-grandmother

== Production ==
During the shoot of Periya Idathu Mappillai, Guru Dhanapal was simultaneously making another film with Jayaram titled Raja Magal which did not release.

== Soundtrack ==
The music was composed by Sirpy. The song "Kadhalin Formula" was inspired from the Arabic artist Amr Diab's album Nour El Ain.

Song	Singer(s)	Lyrics	Duration
"Achcha Namasthe"	Mano	Palani Bharathi	4:05
"Chik Chik"	Mano, Swarnalatha	Palani Bharathi	4:37
"Kadhalin Formula"	Mano, K. S. Chithra	Palani Bharathi	4:38
"Kanne Pasam"	Hariharan	Kalidasan	3:30
"Oh Jaana Oh Jaana"	P. Unnikrishnan, Ishrath	Palani Bharathi	4:19
"Saare Jahanse"	Mano, K. S. Chithra, Ishrath	Muhammad Iqbal	1:38
"Yeno Yeno"	Mano	Palani Bharathi	4:18
