= Ragasiya Police =

- Poster
- Directed by: R. S. Elavarasan
- Written by: R. S. Elavarasan; Balakumaran (dialogues)
- Produced by: A. N. Sundaresan
- Starring: R. Sarathkumar; Nagma
- Cinematography: Ashok Kumar
- Edited by: G. Jayachandran
- Music by: Laxmikant–Pyarelal
- Production company: A. N. S. Film International
- Release date: 23 October 1995
- Running time: 155 minutes
- Country: India
- Language: Tamil

Ragasiya Police (transl. Secret Police) is a 1995 Indian Tamil-language action thriller film written and directed by R. S. Elavarasan. The film stars R. Sarathkumar and Nagma, with Radhika, Anandaraj, Goundamani, Devan, and Senthil. It was released on 23 October 1995, where it ran for 50 days in theatres and became flop at the box-office.

== Plot ==
Tamil Nadu Home Minister Ponnurangam, one of the four founders of the ruling party, wants to become the state's CM, but is unsuccessful in his attempt whereas his co-founders and juniors have become the CM for many years. Due to this, Ponnurangam calls Azhagam Perumal, a domestic terrorist, and orders him to create chaos in the city. Azhagam Perumal sets off a bomb in the head office of the state's major opposition party, where 22 people died during the bomb blast.

Consequently, the incumbent Chief Minister charges the new ATS's ACP Suriya to track down the terrorist group. Suriya's girlfriend Raji's brother Dinesh is the one, who has been tracking Azhagam Perumal for the last six months, before the blast. Two of Azhagam Perumal's attempts to kill the CM goes in vain due to Suriya, where he gets injured in the second attempt. Azhagam Perumal tells Ponnurangam to either remove Suriya from his path or find another guy to finish the CM. Using his influence, Ponnurangam gets Suriya transferred to the Anti-Prostitution Department, and Dinesh is given the responsibility of the case.

Meanwhile, Suriya arrests Ponnurangam's illegal concubine Ezhilarasi, who is the head of a huge brothel. He accidentally comes across Dinesh, trying to capture a terrorist in the central station, and the police attempt goes awry. Suriya is later framed for going to a brothel when he was on an undercover attempt, and gets suspended. An attempt is made on Suriya's life, which he escapes, but Dinesh is killed in his house, and Suriya's mother is also killed in a blast at his home. Suriya and Raji heads to complain about Ponnurangam to the CM, but she is unable to do anything immediately as she is going on a state visit to Seychelles. Suriya accompanies the CM as her chief bodyguard.

Meanwhile, Ponnurangam is watching the TV show of the CM's visit, waiting for her death, as he would immediately become the acting CM. However, Raji arrives there and holds Ponnurangam at gunpoint, but he snatches her gun and holds her at bay. An attempt is made on the CM's life, but Suriya still saves her and captures the disguised Azhagam Perumal. Hearing about Azhagam Perumal's arrest, Ponnurangam commits suicide.

== Cast ==
- R. Sarathkumar as ACP Suriya IPS
- Nagma as Raji, Suriya's love interest
- Radhika as Chief Minister of Tamil Nadu
- Anandaraj as Azhagam Perumal, a domestic terrorist
- Goundamani as Ponnurangam, Home Minister of Tamil Nadu
- Devan as ACP Dinesh, Raji's brother
- Senthil as Harichandran, Ponnurangam's personal assistant
- Vinu Chakravarthy as Dharmaraj, Chennai Police Commissioner
- Sangeeta as Suriya's mother
- Vichithra as Ezhilarasi, Ponnurangam's concubine and leader of a big brothel
- S. N. Lakshmi
- Mahanadi Shankar
- R. N. Sudarshan
- R. N. K. Prasad
- Jyothi Meena as item number
- Kavithasri
- Bindiya
- Muthukumar
- Krishnamoorthy
- Raviraj
- O. A. K. Sundar

== Production ==
Ragasiya Police marked the directorial debut of Ilavarasan, a film institute student. The filming of songs were held at France and Switzerland and also at Amsterdam, Mauritius and the climax was shot at Seychelles island.

== Soundtrack ==
The soundtrack was composed by Laxmikant–Pyarelal, with lyrics written by Vaali.

| Song | Singer(s) | Duration |
|---|---|---|
| "Yen Yen" | S. P. Balasubrahmanyam, Kavita Krishnamurthy | 6:03 |
| "Maiyil Thogai" | S. P. Balasubrahmanyam | 5:17 |
| "Manmathan" | K. S. Chithra, Kavita Krishnamurthy | 5:22 |
| "Kann Imaikkamal" | Mano, Swarnalatha | 3:59 |
| "Kann Imaikkamal" (repeat) | Mano, Swarnalatha | 3:59 |
| "Echangatru" | Kavita Krishnamurthy | 6:17 |

== Reception ==
Thulasi of Kalki wrote it is a film that does not disappoint the fans who are expecting 100% entertainment. D. S. Ramanujam of The Hindu wrote, "Director R. S. Elavarasan, has written a story suitable to the palate of the present day viewers, where well-built and handsome hero, Sarathkumar goes full blast in action scenes and completes the drama aspects with controlled acting. Goundamani playing the villain after a long time, does it with a measure of conviction".
