= Nalla Manasukkaran =

- Directed by: Jaya Rajanderan
- Written by: Jaya Rajanderan
- Produced by: P. K. Sadevivam; Jaya Rajanderan
- Starring: Pandiarajan; Jayarakini; Senthil; S. S. Chandran
- Cinematography: Ravindhar
- Edited by: V. Rajagopal; S. Govindasamy
- Music by: Deva
- Production company: Annai Sree Baalaambikai Creations
- Release date: 14 January 1997
- Country: India
- Language: Tamil

Nalla Manusukkaran (transl. The good-hearted man) is a 1997 Indian Tamil-language film, directed by Jaya Rajanderan and produced by P. K. Sadevivam and Jaya Rajanderan. The film stars Pandiarajan, Jayarakini, Senthil and S. S. Chandran. It was released on 14 January 1997 and failed at the box-office.

== Cast ==
- Pandiarajan
- Jayarakini
- Senthil
- S. S. Chandran
- Ennuyir Alex
- V. K. Ramasamy
- Vennira Aadai Moorthy
- Vadivukkarasi
- Jyothi Meena
- Rocky
- Veera
- Gandhimathi
- Kovai Sarala
- Psycho R. S. Nathan
- Kumarimuthu
- Rocket Ramanathan
- P. K. Sadhasivam
- S. V. Ramdass
- T. K. S. Natarajan
- Ali
- Charles
- Marimuthu
- Bindhu Sri
- Kanagapriya
- Sri Madhi
- Shyamala

== Production ==
The film was directed by Jaya Rajendran who earlier wrote the story for the film Naanum Indha Ooruthan.

== Soundtrack ==
Soundtrack was composed by Deva.

Track listing
No.	Title	Lyrics	Singer(s)	Length
1.	"Chinna Pandi Then Pandi"	Kalidasan	Swarnalatha, T. K. S. Natarajan, Malaysia Vasudevan
2.	"Paattu Padippom"	Kalidasan	Deva, Swarnalatha
3.	"Pollachi Rottu Mele"		Shahul Hameed, Swarnalatha
4.	"Valayal Vaangalayo"	Kalidasan	T. K. S. Natrajan, Mano, Swarnalatha
5.	"Nandhavanathil Oru Roja"	Kalidasan	Malaysia Vasudevan
6.	"Aayiram Kannatha"	Jaya Rajendran	Mano, Swarnalatha

== Release ==
The film was released on 14 January 1997. It did not run even for a week in theatres and failed at the box-office. According to writer Sura, Jaya Rajendran later changed his name as Rajesh Varma and made a film called Royal Family with Saravanan; however that film never got released and Rajendran died.
