= King (1998 film) =

1998 film by Srikanth Kulkarni

- Directed by: Srikanth Kulkarni
- Screenplay by: Tiger Prabhakar
- Story by: Tiger Prabhakar
- Produced by: H. V. Sadanand
- Starring: Tiger Prabhakar; Arun Pandian; Rajeshwari; Vichithra; Anju; Jyothi Meena
- Cinematography: Mallikarjun
- Edited by: K. Narasaiah
- Music by: Devdas
- Production company: S. P. Movies
- Release date: 30 October 1998
- Running time: 126 minutes
- Country: India
- Language: Kannada

King is a 1998 Indian Kannada language film directed by Srikanth Kulkarni. Tiger Prabhakar wrote the film's story and screenplay and also stars as the lead actor alongside Arun Pandian, Rajeshwari, Vichithra, Anju and Jyothi Meena. Dheerendra Gopal, Sundar Raj, Prithviraj, H. G. Dattatreya feature in supporting roles.

== Cast ==
- Tiger Prabhakar as Madhusudan / Mahendraverma
- Arun Pandian as Chandrahasa
- Rajashree as Rajeshwari
- Vichithra as Vichithra
- Anju
- Jyothi Meena
- Dheerendra Gopal as priest
- Sundar Raj
- Prithviraj
- H. G. Dattatreya as King
- R. N. Sudarshan
- Sathyajith
- Vijaya Kashi as Krishna
- Sarigama Viji
- Ravindra
- Rajanand as Vichithra's grandfather
- Mandeep Roy

== Reception ==
Srikanth Srinivasa of Deccan Herald, gave the film a negative review and wrote that it "is a disaster from the word go." He wrote, "Prabhakar is irritating and hopelessly annoying" and that the film "defies all logic and comprehension." he concluded writing, "Atrocious and disgusting fare!"
