= Periya Manushan =

- Poster
- Directed by: Guru Dhanapal
- Written by: Guru Dhanapal
- Produced by: G. Seethalaxmi
- Starring: Sathyaraj; Ravali
- Cinematography: D. Shankar
- Edited by: P. Sai Suresh
- Music by: Deva
- Production company: Guru Film International
- Release date: 30 October 1997
- Running time: 150 minutes
- Country: India
- Language: Tamil

Periya Manushan (transl. Respectable Man) is a 1997 Indian Tamil-language comedy film directed by Guru Dhanapal. The film stars Sathyaraj and Ravali. It was released on 30 October 1997.

== Plot ==
Ramakrishnan (Sathyaraj) has two wives. Sivagami (Ambika), his first wife, is sterile while Parvathi (Kovai Sarala), his second wife, has a daughter, Indhu (Ravali). Indhu falls in love with, Ramakrishnan's nephew, Subramani (Sathyaraj).

== Cast ==
- Sathyaraj as Ramakrishnan and Subramani
- Ravali as Indhu
- Manivannan as Johnson
- Ambika as Sivagami
- Kovai Sarala as Parvathi
- Vadivelu as Chellappa
- Nizhalgal Ravi as Indhu's cousin
- Vinu Chakravarthy as Indhu's uncle
- Vennira Aadai Moorthy
- Arivoli
- Alphonsa
- Sharmili
- Halwa Vasu
- Thalapathi Dinesh as Marimuthu
- Mayilsamy
- S. P. Balasubrahmanyam as a doctor

== Production ==
Ravali replaced Shruti in the lead role of the film. A song sequence with two hundred boats carrying light of thousands of lamps with actors and hundred junior artists was shot at forest of Chalakudy.

== Soundtrack ==
The soundtrack were composed by Deva.

Song	Singer(s)	Lyrics	Duration
"Arabia Eecham Pazhame"	Mano, K. S. Chithra	Kalidasan	5:25
"Vaalapaari Chinna"	Anuradha Sriram, Mano	Palani Bharathi	5:00
"Thuli Thuli Pani Thuli"	Hariharan, K. S. Chithra	Kalidasan	4:53
"Oh Mama"	K. S. Chithra, Mano	Kalidasan	4:55
"Thrissur Ther Azhage"	K. J. Yesudas, Deva	Vaali	5:23

== Release and reception ==
Periya Manushan was released on 30 October 1997 on the eve of Diwali. The film did not perform well at the box office. Manivannan won the Cinema Express Award for Best Comedian.
