= Unna Nenachen Pattu Padichen =

- Poster
- Directed by: Guru Dhanapal
- Written by: Guru Dhanapal
- Produced by: G. D. Ramesh
- Starring: Karthik; Sasikala; Monisha
- Cinematography: Guru Dhanapal
- Edited by: K. R. Ramalingam
- Music by: Ilaiyaraaja
- Production company: Sree Padmavathy Movie Makers
- Release date: 12 April 1992
- Running time: 140 minutes
- Country: India
- Language: Tamil

Unna Nenachen Pattu Padichen (transl. I thought of you, I recited a song) is a 1992 Indian Tamil-language drama film written and directed by Guru Dhanapal. The film stars Karthik, Sasikala and Monisha. It was released on 12 April 1992.

== Plot ==
Muthurasu and Periyasamy are brothers living with their father, the village headman, Nattamai, and their grandmother. When Nattamai learns that his niece Meenakshi is being married off without his knowledge, he confronts Meenakshi's father, Rathnasamy, insisting she be married to one of his sons, as per custom. Rathnasamy refuses, holding a long-standing grudge against Nattamai over past dowry disputes. Humiliated, Muthurasu and Periyasamy, following their father's advice, set out to abduct Meenakshi. Rathnasamy's men intercept them, but the brothers overpower and take Meenakshi away. During the escape, a spear is hurled from nowhere and fatally wounds Periyasamy.

Angered by the cancellation of his wedding, Meenakshi's groom, Maarithevan, confronts Muthurasu with his men. The villagers stop them at the village boundary, and just as violence threatens to erupt between the two villages, a police inspector intervenes. The issue is taken to the village panchayat, where Rathnasamy demands Meenakshi's return. On the inspector's suggestion, Meenakshi is asked for her choice. She declares she despises Maarithevan and threatens suicide if forced to marry him, choosing instead to stay in her uncle Nattamai's house. Maarithevan vows to marry her regardless. Nattamai arranges Meenakshi's marriage with Muthurasu, a union she accepts. Muthurasu, however, refuses marriage, burdened by the loss of his cousin Dhanam, who died years earlier. Without marriage, Meenakshi's stay in their home would tarnish her honor, yet Muthurasu remains firm. Curious, Meenakshi asks about Dhanam.

Muthurasu's grandmother recounts the past: Muthurasu and Dhanam loved each other deeply. One day, while hiding from the family, Dhanam concealed herself in a wooden box. Unaware, Nattamai locked the room, and the box latched shut. When Muthurasu returned, he discovered Dhanam had suffocated inside. Traumatized, he has since rejected the idea of marriage. Hearing this, Meenakshi develops respect and love for Muthurasu's unwavering devotion. Though unmarried, Meenakshi tries to win his affection. Maarithevan attacks Muthurasu through his henchman Azhagu, but Muthurasu defeats them. He buys Meenakshi new sarees, noticing she has none since her arrival.

Once, Meenakshi jumps into a well when Muthurasu refuses to eat her cooking, pretending to faint to evoke his concern. When Muthurasu learns of her act, he punishes her by hiding her clothes while she bathes in the river, but soon returns them. Muthurasu urges his father to find a groom for Meenakshi and even brings a family forward, but Nattamai insists she is destined only for him. Rathnasamy convenes the panchayat, demanding Meenakshi either marry Muthurasu as promised or be returned to him. Despite Meenakshi's wishes, the panchayat decides she should go with her father. As Rathnasamy forcibly takes her away, Muthurasu rescues Meenakshi. Rathnasamy demands an immediate marriage or her return. Unable to let go of Dhanam, Muthurasu refuses marriage. The inspector intervenes to allow Meenakshi to stay where she chooses, returning to Muthurasu's home, and advises Muthurasu to marry Meenakshi at least for her happiness.

Following Dhanam's mother, Vellathayi's advice, Meenakshi dresses and behaves like Dhanam to please him, but Muthurasu slaps her. The temple priest instructs Meenakshi to light a thousand lamps on a full-moon night to gain blessings, but even this fails. In despair, Meenakshi attempts suicide by setting her saree ablaze, only to be rescued by Muthurasu. She breaks down, confessing that just as he cannot forget Dhanam, she cannot forget him, either. Conflicted, Muthurasu dreams of Dhanam, who reassures him that Meenakshi's love mirrors her own and urges him to accept Meenakshi. Meanwhile, heavy rains cause the lake bund to breach, forcing villagers to evacuate. Also, Meenakshi is abducted by Maarithevan to forcibly marry her, but Muthurasu spots them, and in a fierce one-on-one battle, Muthurasu overpowers Maarithevan.

The floodwaters sweep everyone away into a raging river, separating Meenakshi from Muthurasu. Believing he has lost her, Muthurasu grieves—until Meenakshi reappears. As Muthurasu reaches out to embrace her, Meenakshi makes him tie the thali taken from the deity's statue. Meenakshi embraces him, fulfilled at last, having won the love she fought for so relentlessly.

== Cast ==
- Karthik as Muthurasu
- Sasikala as Meenakshi
- Monisha as Dhanam
- Nizhalgal Ravi as Periyasamy
- Anandaraj as Maarithevan, Meenakshi's groom
- Janagaraj as Duraikannu, nadaswara vidwan
- Rajesh as Inspector
- Senthil as Oththu Kuppusamy "Oththu"
- Vinu Chakravarthy as Nattamai, Muthurasu's father
- Vijayan as Rathnasamy, Meenakshi's father
- Gandhimathi as Muthurasu's grandmother
- P. R. Varalakshmi as Vellathayi, Dhanam's mother
- Vijaya Chandrika as Meenakshi's mother
- Kovai Sarala as Shanthi
- Tiruppur Ramasamy as a villager
- A. K. Veerasamy as Poosari
- Mannangatti Subramaniam as a thavil player
- Master Jeyan as Dhanam's brother
- Azhagu as Azhagu
- Mottai Seetharaman as Pannaiyar
- Karuppu Subbiah as the donkey's owner
- Periya Karuppu Thevar as a villager
- Singamuthu as a villager in the panchayath (uncredited role)

== Production ==
The climax flood sequence was shot in a set at Hogenekkal.

== Soundtrack ==
The music was composed by Ilaiyaraaja. The song in the film "Ennai Thottu Alli Konda" has a cult following in Tamil Nadu.

Song	Singer(s)	Lyrics	Duration
"Ennai Thottu"	Swarnalatha, S. P. Balasubrahmanyam	Piraisoodan	4:54
"Kanna Un Kannil"	Swarnalatha	Piraisoodan	4:49
"Vaanam Idi Idikka"	S. P. Balasubrahmanyam, S. Janaki	Gangai Amaran	4:59
"Mundi Mundi Nayaagare"	Malaysia Vasudevan, Ilaiyaraaja	Ponnadiyan	5:28
"Thottu Thottu Thukkipattu"	Minmini	Vaali	4:58

== Reception ==
Sundarji of Kalki felt only the first 13 minutes of the film were interesting, and the film later became boring.
