= Pepsi Uma =

Indian video jockey

- Born: Uma Maheswari
- Occupation: Video jockey
- Years active: 1992–2013
- Spouse: Sukesh

Uma Maheswari, better known as Pepsi Uma, is an Indian video jockey known for her work in Tamil-language television. She was noted for her "mellifluous voice and flawless diction".

== Career ==
Uma worked as a video jockey since she was eleven years old. In 1994, she hosted Ungal Choice, a weekly phone-in show sponsored by Pepsi on Sun TV. In 2000, the show was Sun TV's longest show with three-hundred and twenty-five episodes. She subsequently earned the name Pepsi Uma. She simultaneously hosted Star Show in which she and Gangai Amaran discussed an issue every week with people from the Tamil film industry including Trisha and Srikanth. In a poll taken in 2000, she was voten the best anchor of Tamil Nadu. She later switched to Kalaignar TV and left in March 2008.

In 2013, Uma hosted an hour show on Jaya TV titled Album. During her work as a video jockey, she received several film offers from Rajinikanth (two films including Muthu), Subhash Ghai for a film with Shah Rukh Khan, K. Balachander and Bharathiraja but did not accept them due to lack of interest. She also decided against doing an ad with Sachin Tendulkar due to the costumes. Unlike other video jockeys, Uma preferred wearing saris in all her shows.

== Personal life ==
Uma is married to Sukesh, a Punjabi man she met while shooting for an advertisement. During her tenure with Jaya TV, she was harassed by a senior producer named Saravanaraj, who was later arrested. Her fans wanted to build a temple for her in Kumily. A distraught fan sent her a mail containing part of his cut pinky which shocked Uma. As of 2009, she manages her family business Krypton Engineering and a production company.
