= Maaman Magal (1995 film) =

- Poster
- Directed by: Guru Dhanapal
- Written by: Guru Dhanapal
- Produced by: A. G. Subramaniam; A. G. Krishnan
- Starring: Sathyaraj; Meena; Goundamani
- Cinematography: D. Shankar
- Edited by: P. Sai Suresh
- Music by: Adithyan
- Production company: A. G. S. Movies
- Release date: 2 December 1995
- Country: India
- Language: Tamil

Maaman Magal (transl. Uncle's daughter) is a 1995 Indian Tamil-language romantic comedy film directed by Guru Dhanapal. The film stars Sathyaraj, Meena, Goundamani and Manorama, along with Jayachitra in the lead negative role. It was released on 2 December 1995.

== Plot ==
The story starts from Manikkam's entry in the film. He wants to drag down Devi Rajalakshmi, and he asks Shanmugam to marry his daughter Priya, so those two start cheating Devi and Priya. After Priya and Shanmugam get married, the truth comes to light. The plot takes a twist when Priya files for a divorce. The plot completes by Priya leaving her solitude and joining Shanmugam.

== Cast ==
- Sathyaraj as Shanmugam (Shamugasundaram)
- Meena as Priya
- Goundamani as Maams
- Manivannan as Manikkam, Priya's father
- Jayachitra as Devi Rajalakshmi, Priya's mother
- Pratap K. Pothen as Chithra's husband
- Anandaraj as Paramasivam
- Manorama as Shanmugam's mother
- Ponnambalam as Govindhan
- Ponvannan as Muthurasu
- Sathyapriya as Muthurasu's mother
- Kaviyasri as Chithra
- Jyothi Meena
- Meesai Murugesan
- Halwa Vasu
- LIC Narasimhan
- Chitti as Lawyer
- Raviraj as Judge
- Kavithasri
- Gurdas Maan (guest appearance in song "Chupke Chupke")

== Production ==
The film saw Sathyaraj, Goundamani, Meena and Guru Dhanapal teaming for second time after Thai Maaman (1994). Sathyaraj portrayed a female character for several scenes, during which his voice was dubbed by voice artist Hema Malini. Punjabi singer Gurdas Maan made his Tamil debut with this film; he sang and appeared in a song.

== Soundtrack ==
The soundtrack was composed by Adithyan.

Song	Singer(s)	Lyrics
"Vadugapatti Vayasu Kutti"	Shahul Hameed, Sangeetha Sajith	Kalidasan
"Jumma Jumma"	S. P. Balasubrahmanyam, Sujatha	Kalidasan
"Chupke Chori Chori"	K. S. Chithra, Gurdas Maan	Vaali
"Dhimthana Thomthana"	Mano, K. S. Chithra	Kalidasan
"Kuyile Kuyil"	Sujatha	Kalidasan
"Maman Magale"	Mano, Malaysia Vasudevan, T. K. Kala, Adithyan	Gangai Amaran

== Release and reception ==
Kalki called it a cocktail which has much needed kick that fans expect, but the screenplay is too old. The critic concluded that the fans who are soaked in fights, songs and dance are going to give overwhelming support. D. S. Ramanujam of The Hindu wrote, "The taming of the mother-in-law and her daughter were favourite in Sixties and gets one more variation in tune with the present day mood in AGS Films International's, Maaman Magal, director Guru Dhanapal making it a light-hearted comedy with entertaining ingredients".

== Legacy ==
Post-release, the comedy sequences of Sathyaraj and Goundamani were widely appreciated. In 2018, the trailer of the film Kalavani Mappillai was compared to the plot of Maaman Magal.
