= P. K. Mishra =

Indian poet

- Born: P. K. Mishra; 13 January 1943; Sujangarh Rajasthan, British India
- Died: 19 December 2008 (aged 65); Chennai, Tamil Nadu, India
- Occupations: Poet, Lyricist
- Years active: 1992-2008

P. K. Mishra (13 January 1943 – 19 December 2008) was an Indian Hindustani poet and lyricist. He penned numerous hit songs such as Dil Hai Chhota Sa, Bharath humko Jaan Se Pyaara Hai Hindustan Hamara etc. He has written 316 songs in 61 Hindi films.

== Career ==
Mishra started his career in 1992 with the film Roja which was composed by A. R. Rehman. He penned the Hindi version of all the songs of the Tamil tunes. He wrote "Dil Hai Chhota Sa" and "Bharat Humko Jaan Se Pyaara Hai", both earned immense popularity. He went on to write lyrics for Tamil and Telugu dubbed Hindi movies and hindi versions of popular tunes composed by A. R. Rehman, Ilaiyaraaja, Vidyasagar, M. M. Keeravani etc. He has written lyrics for films such as Hindustani (2003), Hamse Hai Muqabala (1993), Thalapathi (1991), My Brother Nikhil (2005), Saza-e-Kalapani', Duniya Dilwalon Ki, Viswa Vidhata, Mukhbiir etc. He introduced lyricist Raqueeb Alam to A. R. Rehman at the recording of Roja, who went on to sing songs for Rehman in several films.

== Death ==
He died at a city hospital in Chennai at the age of 65.

== Filmography ==
- Dalpati (1992)
- Pyaar Ka Saawan (1991)
- Bandhu (1992)
- Aadmi (1993)
- Roja (1993)
- Bhairav Dweep (1994)
- Dharam Yoddha (1994)
- Mera Pyaara Bharat (1994)
- Mere Humsafar (1994)
- Priyanka (1995)
- Aaj Ka Romeo (1995)
- Chor Chor (1995)
- Muthu Maharaja (1995)
- Shri Satyanarayan Vrat Katha (1995)
- Velu Naayakan (1995)
- Chhaila (1996)
- Maa Ki Shakti (1996)
- Maun (1996)
- Pehli Nazar Mein (1996)
- Sazaa-E-Kalapani (1996)
- Tu Hi Mera Dil (1996)
- Khel Khiladi Ka (1997)
- Sajna Doli Leke Aana (1997)
- Vishwa Vidhaata (1997)
- Kanoon Ka Khiladi (1998)
- Shaitano Ka Honeymoon (1998)
- Mr. Romeo (1999)
- Aaj Ka Ravan(2000)
- Sanam Tere Hain Hum (2000)
- Sant Gyaneshwar (2000)
- Mujhe Pyaar Hua Tumse (2001)
- Vaishnovi Maa Ki Mahima (2001)
- 16 December (2002)
- Aaj Ka Deviputra (2002)
- Badmash No. 1 (2002)
- Mitr My Friend (2002)
- Sherni Ka Shikar (2002)
- Mahima Kaashi Vishwanath Ki (2003)
- Kiss Kis Ko (2004)
- Mission Azad (2004)
- Tauba Tauba (2004)
- Dharma - The Warrior (2005)
- My Brother... Nikhil (2005)
- Ghamandee (2005)
- Main Hoon Soldier (2007)
- Naya Jigar (2007)
- Taaqat (2007)
- Meri Jung: One Man Army (2007)
- Sivaji: The Boss (2007)
- Coolie - The Real Baazigar (2008)
- Great Dharmatma (2008)
- Meri Izzat (2008)
- Mukhbiir (2008)
- The Return of Tezaab (2003)
- Dham Dhoom (2009)
- Karm Aur Dharm (2009)
- The Return of Khakee (2009)
