= Jyothi Meena =

Indian actress

- Born: Jyothi Meena; Chennai, Tamil Nadu
- Occupation: Actress
- Years active: 1995–2001
- Parent: Jyothi Lakshmi

Jyothi Meena is an Indian actress who has predominantly appeared in Tamil films. She is best remembered for her item numbers and supporting roles in Ullathai Allitha and Azhagana Naatkal.

== Personal life ==
Jyothi Meena was born in Chennai, Tamil Nadu, India. She is the daughter of actress Jyothi Lakshmi and her father is a camera man. Her mother died at her residence in Chennai on 8 August 2016 due to blood cancer.

== Career ==
She first appeared in the R. Sarathkumar's Tamil film, Ragasiya Police. She has appeared in supporting roles, notably in Ullathai Allitha, Azhagana Naatkal and Gopala Gopala. She has also appeared in item numbers alongside Vijay, Ajith Kumar, Prabhu and R. Sarathkumar. She retired from acting after marriage. In October 2017, she said during an interview that she will return to acting if she can find a good character role.

== Filmography ==
Year	Film	Role	Language
1995	Thirumoorthy	Unknown	Tamil
1995	Vishnu	item Number	Tamil
1995	Mr. Madras	Item Number	Tamil
1995	Ragasiya Police	Item Number	Tamil
1995	Maaman Magal	Unknown	Tamil
1996	Parambarai	Mangamma	Tamil
1996	Ullathai Allitha	Meena	Tamil
1996	Vishwanath	Item Number	Tamil
1996	Mr. Romeo		Tamil
1996	Aruva Velu	Ponni	Tamil
1996	Gopala Gopala	Annakili	Tamil
1996	Family	Item Number	Telugu
1996	Nethaji	Unknown	Tamil
1996	Maanbumigu Maanavan	Jayalakshmi	Tamil
1996	Pudhu Nilavu	Unknown	Tamil
1997	Vaimaye Vellum	Unknown	Tamil
1997	Simhada Mari	Item Number	Kannada
1997	Samrat		Tamil
1997	Nattupura Nayagan	Valli	Tamil
1997	Nalla Manasukkaran	Jyothi	Tamil
1997	Aahaa Enna Porutham		Tamil
1997	Nesam	item dancer	Tamil
1997	Masmaram	Jenny	Malayalam
1997	Udaan	Item Number	Hindi
1997	Pudhayal	Unknown	Tamil
1998	Vettu Onnu Thundu Rendu		Tamil
1998	Murattu Kadhal		Tamil
1998	King		Kannada
2000	Priyam	Unknown	Telugu
2001	Ladies and Gentlemen		Malayalam
2001	Azhagana Naatkal	Asha	Tamil
