= Ponnambalam (actor) =

Indian actor

- Occupations: Actor, stuntman, director
- Years active: 1987–present
- Spouse: Jayamani
- Children: 2

Ponnambalam is an Indian actor and stuntman who has predominantly worked in Tamil cinema. He is best known for playing antagonistic roles in Indian films during the 1990s, notably appearing in Tamil-language films such as Nattamai (1994), Muthu (1995) and Amarkkalam (1999). Later in his career, Ponnambalam also appeared in a few leading roles, while also taking up the mantle of director and producer.

== Career ==
Ponnambalam made his debut in cinema as a stuntman, and often appeared as an extra fighter in films, starring in minor roles in films including Apoorva Sagodharargal (1989) and Michael Madana Kama Rajan (1990). As a result of his proficiency as a stuntman, he later received the nickname "Spare Parts" Ponnambalam as no part of his body was ever injured or fractured. He made a breakthrough as an actor following the success of P. Vasu's Walter Vetrivel (1993), and subsequently starred in several prominent Tamil films in the 1990s in villainous roles. Notable characters he portrayed including his work in Nattamai (1994), Muthu (1995) and Amarkkalam (1999). Ponnambalam also played the lead roles in film including the action drama Muthal Echarikkai (1999) and Ammaiyappa (2002), where he featured alongside actress Roshini. Reviewing the film, a critic noted "the movie does little other than prove conclusively that Ponnambalam is not cut out to be a hero", and that "though he picks a role that suits his build, emotes surprisingly well and fights aggressively, his looks make it difficult for us to accept him as a conventional leading man".

Ponnambalam turned director and producer through the film, Pattaya Kelappu, starring Sriman in the lead role. Despite beginning in 2004, the film had a delayed release, while another directorial venture titled Thethi 32 was subsequently dropped. Ponnambalam began a project titled Idiyudan Koodiya Mazhai during 2010, starring newcomers. Despite beginning production, the film was shelved and eventually did not have a theatrical release. His acting commitments thereafter also decreased, with notable appearances in the period including roles as a village chief in Tamizh Padam (2010) and characters in Venghai (2011) and the historical drama, Ponnar Shankar (2011).

In 2018, Ponnambalam took part in the second season of the reality show Bigg Boss Tamil hosted by Kamal Haasan. His stay in the house was controversial, as he was accused of making misogynistic comments against the female housemates, particularly against Yashika Aanand, Aishwarya Dutta, Mamathi Chari and Mumtaj and was nominated each week for the eviction from the second week of the show onwards. He was evicted during the eighth week of the show during mid-August 2018.

== Personal life ==
Ponnambalam joined the All India Anna Dravida Munnetra Kazhagam (AIADMK) in February 2011, beginning a career in politics. He campaigned for the AIADMK party in the Indian general election of 2014. In June 2017, he left the AIADMK and joined the Bharatiya Janata Party (BJP) in the presence of the Union Minister of State for Finance and Shipping, Pon Radhakrishnan. On joining the party, Ponnambalam stated that no other party seemed "concerned about the welfare of people" and hence, he decided to join the BJP.

== Filmography ==
=== Tamil films ===
Year	Film	Role	Notes
1988	Kaliyugam	Prisoner	
1989	Apoorva Sagodharargal		
1989	Vetri Vizha		
1990	Michael Madana Kama Rajan	Assassin	
1991	Vetri Padigal		
1991	Pudhu Manithan		
1991	Maanagara Kaaval		
1991	Moondrezhuthil En Moochirukkum	Rogue	
1992	Naangal		
1992	Thangarasu		
1992	Bharathan	Gangadharan's right hand	
1992	Naalaya Seidhi		
1992	Kottai Vaasal		
1992	Senthamizh Paattu		
1992	Ellaichami	Balayandi	
1992	Samundi		
1993	Walter Vetrivel	Kabali	
1993	Maamiyar Veedu		
1993	Pettredutha Pillai		
1993	Vedan		
1993	Airport		
1993	Senthoorapandi	Ponnambalam	
1994	Honest Raj	Pandian	
1994	Indhu	Veeraiyan	
1994	Thai Maaman		
1994	Periya Marudhu	Senkodan	
1994	Nattamai	Ponnambalam	
1994	Nila		
1995	Coolie	Old Union Leader	
1995	Marumagan		
1995	Gandhi Pirantha Mann		
1995	Periya Kudumbam	Sundarapandi's first brother	
1995	Muthu	Kaali	
1995	Chandralekha	Mustafa	
1995	Ilaya Ragam		
1995	Maaman Magal	Govindhan	
1996	Indian	Kondithoppu Kada Kumar	
1996	Namma Ooru Raasa	Kangeya	
1996	Senathipathi		
1997	Dharma Chakkaram	K. Singamuthu	
1997	Mannava	Kabali	
1997	Aravindhan		
1997	Arunachalam	Ponnambalam	
1997	Vallal	Uncle of Annam	
1997	Adimai Changili		
1997	Janakiraman		
1998	Vettu Onnu Thundu Rendu	Veerapandi	
1998	Dharma	Khan	
1998	Simmarasi	Police inspector	
1998	Urimai Por	Marthandan	
1998	Veeram Vilanja Mannu	Police inspector	
1999	Thullatha Manamum Thullum		
1999	Chinna Durai		
1999	Ullathai Killathe		
1999	Rajasthan		
1999	Kummi Paattu		
1999	Kanave Kalaiyadhe		
1999	Amarkkalam	Aasai Raj	
1999	Kannupada Poguthaiya		
1999	Kanmani Unakkaga		
1999	Azhagarsamy		
1999	Mudhal Etcharikkai	Ponnambalam	
2000	Thirunelveli	Velu	
2000	Mugavaree		
2000	Thai Poranthachu	Dharma	
2000	Sudhandhiram		
2000	Vallarasu	Manikkam	
2000	Pennin Manathai Thottu		
2000	Maayi		
2000	Ilaiyavan		
2001	Looty		
2001	En Purushan Kuzhandhai Maadhiri	Santhamoorthy	
2001	Sri Raja Rajeshwari		
2001	Thavasi	Kottai Perumal	
2001	Azhagana Naatkal		
2001	Kalakalappu		
2001	Poove Pen Poove		
2002	Vivaramana Aalu	Subramani / Thotta	
2002	Raajjiyam		
2002	Thamizh		
2002	Bagavathi	Vibuthi Ganesan	Uncredited role
2002	Gummalam		
2002	Jaya		
2002	Ammaiyappa	Ammaiyappan	
2003	Ramachandra	Kabali	
2003	Saamy	Corrupt Police Officer	
2003	Thennavan		
2003	Diwan	Kandhavel's second brother	
2003	Chokka Thangam		
2003	Anjaneya	Veerappan	
2004	Jai	Karuppu	
2004	Ghilli	Arivazhagan	
2004	Arul		
2004	Jana	Inspector	
2004	Arasatchi		
2004	Giri		
2004	Bose	Sivamani	
2004	Aai		
2004	Arumugasamy		
2004	Super Da		
2004	Gomathi Nayagam	Sevanthi's father	
2005	Devathaiyai Kanden	Police officer	
2005	Chinna	Chinna's friend	
2005	Mannin Maindhan	Gajapathy	
2005	Kannadi Pookal		
2005	Sevvel		
2006	Saravana		
2006	Suyetchai MLA		
2006	Kalinga		
2006	Perarasu		
2006	Varalaru	Divya's brother	
2007	Ninaithu Ninaithu Parthen		
2007	Aarya	Meesai Perumal	
2007	Malaikottai		
2007	Ennai Paar Yogam Varum		
2007	Kaanal Neer		
2007	Thiru Ranga		
2007	Veerappu	Gowripet Shankar	
2008	Pattaya Kelappu	Anandakrishnan	Also director
2008	Vaitheeswaran		
2008	Aayudham Seivom		
2008	Ezhuthiyatharadi	Pandi	
2008	Theeyavan		
2008	Arai En 305-il Kadavul		
2008	Surya		
2009	Thee	Saleem	
2009	Madurai Sambavam		
2009	Oru Kadhalan Oru Kadhali	Lingesu	
2010	Tamizh Padam	Nattamai	
2010	Thairiyam		
2010	Innisai Kavalan		
2010	Bayam Ariyaan		
2010	Guru Sishyan		
2010	Androru Naal		
2010	Puzhal		
2010	Aarvam		
2010	Nagaram Marupakkam	'Thala Vetti' Thangarasu	
2010	Athisaya Manal Matha		
2011	Bhavani		
2011	Ponnar Shankar	Thalapathi	
2011	Venghai	Anburaja	
2011	Mudhal Idam		
2012	Maasi	Nandha	
2012	Mattuthavani		
2012	Ullam		
2012	Arakkonam		
2012	Virudhunagar Sandhippu		
2013	Keeripulla	Police officer	
2014	Madhavanum Malarvizhiyum		
2014	Adhu Vera Idhu Vera	Police inspector	
2016	Enakku Innoru Per Irukku		Cameo appearance
2016	Parandhu Sella Vaa	Ponnambalam	
2017	12-12-1950	Police inspector	
2018	Pei Irukka Illaya		
2018	Thulam		
2019	Comali	Gaaja	
2019	Chennai 2 Bangkok		
2022	Kaatteri	Ponnambalam	
2026	Vangala Viriguda		

=== Telugu films ===
Year	Film	Role	Notes
1992	Gharana Mogudu	Veeraiyah	
1993	Repati Rowdy	Kallaiah	
1993	Allari Priyudu		
1993	Rowdy Mogudu	Ganapathi	
1993	Mechanic Alludu		
1994	Mugguru Monagallu		
1995	Khaidi Inspector	Sharif	
1997	Hitler	Rudraraju's brother	Dubbed in Tamil as Tiger
1997	Evandi Pelli Chesukondi		
1998	Pavitra Prema	M.L.A. Rayudu	
2000	Sivanna		
2000	Balaram	Harishchandra Prasad's goon	
2000	Nuvvu Vastavani	Indu's house owner	
2000	Choosoddaam Randi	Tiger Dharma	
2001	Eduruleni Manishi		
2001	Narahari		
2002	Chennakesava Reddy		
2003	Palnati Brahmanayudu		
2004	Guri	Seed supplier	
2004	Pedababu	Rudra Raju	
2004	Siva Shankar		
2004	Gudumba Shankar		
2004	Koduku		
2004	Suryam		
2005	Annavaram		
2006	Veerabhadra		
2006	Neeku Naaku		
2007	Andaala Amitabh Bachchan		
2008	Bujjigadu		

=== Malayalam films ===
Year	Film	Role
1988	Moonnam Mura	Peter
1988	Orkkapurathu	Henchman
1990	Samrajyam	Krishna Das's henchman
1995	Prayikkara Paappan	Pazhani's Henchmen
1999	Stalin Sivadas	Bomber
2000	The Warrant	Goon
2002	Thandavam	Goon
2005	Maniyarakallan	Ananda Padmanabhan
2006	Prajapathi	Vanangamudi
2007	Payum Puli	Pandian
2017	Aadu 2	Mayilvahanam

=== Kannada films ===
Year	Film	Role
1994	Chinna	
1995	Dore	
1997	Lady Commissioner	
2000	O Nanna Nalle	
2003	Kiccha	Jayaraj
2003	Annavru	Henchman
2005	Gunna	
2007	Masti	
2007	Police Story 2	
2012	Swaranjali	
2017	Smuggler	

=== Hindi films ===
Year	Film	Role	Notes
1996	Ghatak	Fighter in the Ring	Special Appearance
1996	Rakshak	Tandiya	
2000	Krodh	Munna	
2001	Nayak	Ranga	Voiced by Manoj Pandey

=== Stuntman ===
Year	Film
1987	Shankar Guru
1987	Per Sollum Pillai
1987	Vairakkiyam
1988	Sathya
1988	En Thangai Kalyani
1988	Puthiya Vaanam
1988	Soora Samhaaram
1988	Thaimel Aanai
1988	Poovizhi Raja
1988	Pattikaatu Thambi
1988	Dhayam Onnu
1988	Katha Nayagan
1988	Kaliyugam
1989	Apoorva Sagodharargal
1989	Padicha Pulla
1989	Annanukku Jai
1989	Vettaiyaadu Vilaiyaadu
1989	En Thangai
1989	Vetri Mel Vetri
1990	Avasara Police 100
1990	Sathriyan
1990	Urudhi Mozhi
1990	Raja Kaiya Vacha
1990	My Dear Marthandan
1991	Captain Prabhakaran
1991	Maanagara Kaaval
1991	Moondrezhuthil En Moochirukkum

=== Television ===
- Bigg Boss Tamil 2 (2018)
