= Boogambam =

- Theatrical release poster
- Directed by: Ishaq Hussaini
- Written by: Ishaq Hussaini
- Produced by: Ishaq Hussaini
- Starring: Ishaq Hussaini; Dilshana; Hema; Rishath
- Cinematography: Dayal Osho; Devaraj
- Edited by: N. Naveen Kumar
- Music by: Sadasiva Jayaraman
- Production company: I International
- Release date: 17 October 2025
- Country: India
- Language: Tamil

Boogambam (transl. Earthquake) is a 2025 Indian Tamil-language film written, produced and directed by Ishaq Hussaini. The film stars himself, Dilshana, Hema and Rishath. It was released on 17 October 2025, during Diwali.

== Cast ==
- Ishaq Hussaini
- Dilshana
- Hema
- Rishath

== Production ==
Ishaq Hussaini had plans for Boogambam since at least 2003, describing it as his "dream project". He himself produced the film after many producers refused to finance the film due to its seemingly high budget.

== Release and reception ==
Boogambam was released on 17 October 2025, during Diwali. Dinakaran wrote that Ishaq Hussaini tried to tell the story with a new technique and had crossed the halfway point in technical matters, but more attention should have been paid to the filmmaking. Maalai Malar rated the film 1.5 out of 5 stars, criticising the music but was slightly appreciative of the cinematography and editing. Cinema Inbox was more favourable, but gave a rating of 2 stars out of 5.
