= Kanmani Unakkaga =

- Title card
- Directed by: Ravi-Raja
- Written by: Ishaq Hussaini; Leslie
- Starring: Ishaq Hussaini; Suvaluxmi
- Cinematography: Dayal Osho
- Edited by: N. Haribabu
- Music by: Pradeep Ravi
- Production company: I International
- Release date: 7 November 1999
- Country: India
- Language: Tamil

Kanmani Unakkaga (transl. For you, Kanmani) is a 1999 Indian Tamil-language action thriller film, directed by the duo Ravi-Raja. The film stars Ishaq Hussaini and Suvaluxmi, while Senthil and Jennifer portrayed supporting roles. It was released on 7 November 1999.

== Cast ==
- Ishaq Hussaini as Rishi
- Suvaluxmi as Sudha
- Anandaraj as Pratap
- Mansoor Ali Khan as Karan
- Senthil as Kandha
- Baby Jennifer as Kanmani
- Ponnambalam
- Vadivukkarasi
- Loose Mohan
- Vichithra

== Production ==
Ishaq Hussaini appeared in a series of films in the late 1990s and early 2000s, often scripting and producing his own films. After getting an average response to Jayam (1999), he reunited with the same director duo, Ravi-Raja, to make Kanmani Unakkaga.

== Soundtrack ==
Music was composed by Pradeep Ravi.

Track listing
No.	Title	Length
1.	"Chinna Ponnu"
2.	"En Swasa Kaatre"
3.	"Nee Mazhalai"
4.	"Vazhiyae Oru"
5.	"Ya Ya Pakkam Vaya"

== Release and reception ==
The film was censored with a UA certificate, with two cuts. Malathi Rangarajan of The Hindu wrote "Beginning the film with a bang is appreciable but the challenge lies in keeping the interest of the viewer sustained – and when scenes are protracted beyond a point they could tire the audience. Kanmani Unakkaga does." A critic from Chennai Online wrote "The script loses direction in the second half. A lot of sentiment is thrown in, too many villains crop up, and somewhere along the way the audience loses interest." Sify wrote, "A film best to be forgotten".
