= Vedan =

1993 Indian film

- Theatrical release poster
- Directed by: Suresh Krissna
- Written by: Suresh Krissna; M. S. Madhu (dialogues)
- Produced by: Selvi Thyagarajan; G. Saravanan
- Starring: R. Sarathkumar; Khushbu
- Cinematography: P. S. Prakash
- Edited by: Ganesh Kumar
- Music by: Deva
- Production company: Sathya Jyothi Films
- Release date: 6 May 1993
- Running time: 140 minutes
- Country: India
- Language: Tamil

Vedan (/veɪdən/ transl. Hunter) is a 1993 Indian Tamil-language crime action film directed by Suresh Krissna and produced by Sathya Jyothi Films. The film stars R. Sarathkumar and Khushbu, with Charan Raj, Sarath Babu, Easwari Rao and Radha Ravi in supporting roles. It follows Inspector Vijay as he joins the gang of a notorious criminal, Bhoopathi, under an assumed identity with the sole intention of infiltrating it and also falls in love with his superior officer Ganesh's sister Usha and later witness the slaughter of Ganesh who gave him the task. How Vijay completes the mission even though Bhoopathi has begun to suspect his identity forms the crux of the story. The film was released on 6 May 1993.

== Plot ==
The film starts with a politician being murdered by the henchman of the local don Boopathy. The police commissioner Ganesh appoints the Scotland Yard trainee Vijay to arrest Boopathy. Vijay finally infiltrates Boopathy's gang under the name Ranjith Kumar as an ex-jailbird. Vijay later arranges to kidnap Boopathy's sister Priya, and he rescues her. Boopathy then starts to like him, and Vijay slowly becomes his right hand. In the meantime, Vijay and the bubbly girl Usha fall in love with each other. Thereafter, Ganesh gets killed, and Vijay has to dismantle Boopathy's gang on its own. In addition to this, Boopathy begins to suspect Vijay to be a mole. What transpires next forms the rest of the story.

== Cast ==
- R. Sarathkumar as Vijay IPS (Ranjith Kumar)
- Khushbu as Usha
- Charan Raj as Boopathy
- Sarath Babu as Commissioner Ganesh
- Easwari Rao as Priya
- Radha Ravi as Megharajan
- Charle
- Chinni Jayanth as Ezhumalai
- Janagaraj as McDowell
- Kazan Khan as Madhan
- Ajay Rathnam as Ajay
- Rajesh Kumar as Inspector Bhaskar
- Poovilangu Mohan as Mohan
- Thalapathi Dinesh as Nathan
- Ponnambalam
- Kavithalaya Krishnan as Restaurant Waiter
- Mohan Raman
- Oru Viral Krishna Rao
- Lalitha Kumari
- Abhilasha
- S. N. Parvathy
- Shihan Hussaini

== Soundtrack ==
The music was composed by Deva, with lyrics by Vairamuthu.

Song	Singer(s)	Duration
"Chinna Mulla Thottivida"	Minmini	4:56
"Dina Thanthikku Oru"	K. S. Chithra, S. P. Balasubrahmanyam	5:04
"I Love You"	K. S. Chithra, S. P. Balasubrahmanyam	5:10
"Kamma Karayile Summa Naan"	K. S. Chithra, S. P. Balasubrahmanyam	4:49
"Vazhkaiye Porkalam"	S. P. Balasubrahmanyam	4:50
"Vedan"	S. P. Balasubrahmanyam	5:14

== Release and reception ==
Vedan was released on 6 May 1993. Malini Mannath of The Indian Express called it "lot of gloss and no content; [..] with a very loosely-etched screenplay woven around it." C. R. K. of Kalki praised the acting of Sarathbabu, Sarathkumar and Deva's music and cited for the sake of suspense, evidences which Sarathkumar got continuously getting destroyed and it is not only us who get confused about how the story will end but also the writer and director and concluded by rating major part of the film as A1, sprinklings in between is A and conclusion part is B.
