= Muthu (film) =

1995 film by K. S. Ravikumar

- Theatrical release poster
- Directed by: K. S. Ravikumar
- Screenplay by: K. S. Ravikumar
- Story by: Priyadarshan
- Based on: Thenmavin Kombath
- Produced by: Rajam Balachander; Pushpa Kandaswamy
- Starring: Rajinikanth; Meena; Sarath Babu
- Cinematography: Ashok Rajan
- Edited by: K. Thanikachalam
- Music by: A. R. Rahman
- Production company: Kavithalayaa Productions
- Distributed by: Sivasakthi Movie Makers
- Release date: 23 October 1995
- Running time: 165 minutes
- Country: India
- Language: Tamil
- Box office: ¥400 million ($3.06 million)

Muthu (transl. Pearl) (Note: Also the title character.) is a 1995 Indian Tamil-language masala film written and directed by K. S. Ravikumar, and produced by Kavithalayaa Productions. The film stars Rajinikanth and Meena and Sarath Babu in the lead roles, with Radha Ravi, Senthil, Vadivelu, Jayabharathi, Subhashri and Ponnambalam in supporting roles. It is a remake of the Malayalam film Thenmavin Kombath (1994). The film revolves around a zamindar and his worker falling in love with the same woman who, unknown to the zamindar, loves the worker exclusively.

After Rajinikanth narrated the outline of Thenmavin Kombath, he told Ravikumar to develop the screenplay of the remake without watching the original film. Although largely written to suit the tastes of Tamil-speaking audiences, the remake retains the core premise of the original, while adding new plot details and characters. Ashok Rajan acted as the film's cinematographer. Principal photography began in June 1995 and took place in Mysore, Madras and Kerala. The film was edited by K. Thanikachalam and the music composed by A. R. Rahman, with lyrics written by Vairamuthu.

Muthu was released on 23 October 1995, during the Diwali holiday period, and became a silver jubilee hit. Rajinikanth won various awards for his performance, including the Tamil Nadu State Film Award and the Cinema Express Award, both for Best Actor. The film was released in Japan under the title Muthu Odoru Maharaja (transl. Muthu – The Dancing Maharaja) in 1998 and became the highest-grossing Indian film in Japan, a record it held for 24 years. It sparked a short-lived boom of Indian films released in Japan and helping Rajinikanth gain a large fan following there. The film was remade in Kannada as Sahukara in 2004.

== Plot ==
Muthu is a charioteer working for zamindar Raja Malayasimman. While watching a play, Raja falls in love with an actress, Ranganayaki, when the garland she throws inadvertently falls on him. When Raja sees another of her plays and witnesses her being harassed by a local village chief, he tells Muthu to rescue her. Muthu fights the village chief's goons and rescues Ranganayaki. When more goons appear, Raja advises Muthu to take Ranganayaki safely away in their two-horse chariot while he deals with the goons. Muthu agrees and escapes with her.

Ranganayaki dislikes Muthu's company but is forced to continue accompanying him. They both become tired and leave the horses to seek their own route, landing in Kerala. Muthu, not knowing Malayalam, gets into trouble for asking passersby for a kiss as wrongly tutored by Ranganayaki before she comes to his rescue. After learning what she had meant, Muthu surprises Ranganayaki by kissing her. They fall in love and return to Raja's palace.

Ranganayaki is secretly escaping her abusive brother-in-law, Pratap Rayudu, who killed her sister and is now searching for her. She requests to continue staying at the palace and her associates also join. Raja's maternal uncle Ambalathar, keen to take control of Raja's wealth, plans to get his daughter Padmini married to Raja. Raja's mother Sivakamiyammal keeps requesting her son to marry, referring to Padmini. Raja, dreaming of marrying Ranganayaki, nods his head, and Sivakami sends word to her brother Ambalathar. When Ambalathar arrives and speaks of marriage, Raja reveals his intention to marry Ranganayaki. Angered, Ambalathar brings Rayudu to the palace, who forcibly tries to take Ranganayaki until Muthu subdues him and sends him away.

To remove Ranganayaki and Muthu from the palace and get his daughter married, Ambalathar provokes Raja, through his informer Kaali at the palace, by alleging that Muthu is romancing Ranganayaki. Kaali deliberately misinterprets the discussions between Muthu and Ranganayaki (who are at a distance) as Muthu compelling Ranganayaki to marry him. Believing Kaali's words and what he had seen, an enraged Raja throws Muthu out of the palace after having him beaten up by Kaali. Muthu, who is in shock, does not fight back. Sivakami, who had gone to a temple with Ranganayaki, returns and is shocked on learning what happened. She berates Raja, revealing that Ranganayaki only loves Muthu, as well as the truth about Muthu's past.

Years ago, Muthu's father was the zamindar of the estate. Since he was childless, he named Raja, the son of his cousin Rajasekharan, his successor. Soon after, his wife conceived and died while giving birth to Muthu. At Ambalathar's instigation, Rajasekharan fraudulently obtained the zamindar's signature on blank papers and plotted to have all of the property transferred to his name. Oblivious, the zamindar donated land to the villagers who returned to complain that the lands were not in his name. The zamindar realised what happened, but instead of punishing Rajasekharan, handed over the entire property to him and decided to leave the palace with his infant son Muthu. Sivakami pleaded that she be given the responsibility of raising Muthu. The zamindar agreed but said that his son must be raised as a commoner. After the zamindar left, a remorseful Rajasekharan committed suicide, and Sivakami moved to another village.

Sivakami says she had lied to the public that the zamindar's son had died, and that the zamindar currently lives nearby as a mystic nomad. Raja, realising his mistake, decides to go meet the zamindar and bring him back. Kaali, having overheard this conversation, reports to Ambalathar, who decides to murder Raja and frame Muthu so that he can take over the property. Kaali beats Raja, throws him into a waterfall and informs everyone that Muthu killed Raja. Muthu beats Kaali and makes him reveal that Ambalathar asked him to kill Raja. The villagers chase Ambalathar until Raja arrives with his bride Padmini. Raja was rescued by the zamindar and married Padmini. He forgives Ambalathar. Raja tells Muthu of his true identity, and Muthu rushes to meet his father, only to find that he has already left the place. Muthu becomes the new zamindar but prefers to identify as a worker.

== Cast ==
- Rajinikanth as Muthu and his father
- Meena as Ranganayaki
- Sarath Babu as Raja Malayasimman
- Radha Ravi as Ambalathar
- Senthil as Thennappan
- Vadivelu as Valayapathy
- Jayabharathi as Sivakamiyammal
- Subhashri as Padmini
- Ponnambalam as Kaali
- Vichithra as Rathidevi
- Raghuvaran as Rajasekharan
- Tiger Prabhakar as S. P. Pratap Rayudu
- Gandhimathi as Poongavanam
- Pandu as Pallavarayan
- Jyothi Lakshmi (special appearance in the song "Kokku Saiva Kokku")
- Kumarimuthu as Kamalakannan

Uncredited

- K. S. Ravikumar as the Tamil-speaking Malayali
- P. L. Thenappan as the Kerala tea shop owner
- Ramesh Khanna as an audience member
- Master Mahendran as a tribal
- Crane Manohar as a Kerala tea shop employee
- Bonda Mani as a villager
- Kulappulli Leela as a Malayali

== Production ==
=== Development ===
Rajinikanth wanted K. S. Ravikumar to direct a film for him, and Ravikumar agreed to do so once he finished work on Periya Kudumbam (1995). After buying the rights to remake the 1994 Malayalam film Thenmavin Kombath, Rajinikanth narrated the outline of that film and so told Ravikumar to develop a screenplay of the remake, but he did not let Ravikumar watch the film. The project did not initially have a producer, so Rajinikanth offered to take care of financial matters, but Ravikumar refused. Ravikumar developed the screenplay at the Woodlands Hotel with help from his assistant directors including Ramesh Khanna, while occasionally going to Rajinikanth's office. The film was initially titled Velan before being retitled Muthu. This also marks Rajinikanth’s first collaboration with the director. Ravikumar's remuneration was ₹15 lakh (equivalent to ₹98 lakh or US$100,000 in 2026), his highest at the time. Although Ravikumar was the primary dialogue writer, Rajinikanth wrote certain "punch" dialogues like "Kedaikkaradhu kedaikkama irukkadhu. Kedaikkama irukardhu kedaikadhu" (transl. What is to be obtained would not be lost. What is not to be obtained would be lost).

After completing three-fourths of the script, Ravikumar got permission to watch Thenmavin Kombath and was shocked to see the film's lack of resemblance to his screenplay. Rajinikanth told Ravikumar he did not want him to watch the film to avoid getting "inspired". Though Ravikumar took enough liberties to suit the tastes of Tamil-speaking audiences, the remake retained the original's core premise of a boss and his worker falling in love with the same woman and several other plot points such as the worker and his lover losing their way and ending up in a new land. New plot details and characters were added, including the protagonist's zamindar father and flashback scenes revolving around him. According to Kalaipuli S. Thanu, he was originally going to produce the film, but could not due to "various reasons". It was soon picked up by K. Balachander's Kavithalayaa Productions, and produced by Rajam Balachander and Pushpa Kandaswamy. The cinematography was handled by Ashok Rajan, and editing was handled by K. Thanikachalam. R. Sundaramoorthy provided the makeup for Rajinikanth.

=== Casting ===
Rajinikanth played two roles: Muthu and his unnamed father. According to Madhuvanti Arun, Rajinikanth offered her to do the role of Ranganayaki, but she was not selected because she was considered too young. Pepsi Uma said Rajinikanth offered her the role as well, but she declined. Ravikumar, however, has stated that Meena was his first choice for the role. Her mother was concerned about the amount of screen time Meena would receive when compared to Subhashri (who was cast as Padmini), but Meena still took the role. Arvind Swamy was initially approached to portray Raja Malayasimman but was hesitant to act the scene where his character would slap Muthu. He was a fan of Rajinikanth and felt slapping the actor would anger his fans. Jayaram was later approached for the role but hesitated for the same reason. Though Jayaram suggested making changes to the scene, Ravikumar refused to do so. Sarath Babu was finally cast for the role, at Rajinikanth's suggestion.

Vadivelu and Radha Ravi were cast as Valayapathy and Ambalathar, characters not present in the Malayalam original but created by Ravikumar. Radha Ravi was not initially interested in playing Ambalathar since he had grown weary of playing negative roles, but Rajinikanth insisted. Urvashi was initially signed on to play Padmini, but given the actress' popularity at the time, Rajinikanth advised her against taking up the small role, which later went to Subhashri. Rajinikanth wanted Ravikumar to make a cameo appearance as a Tamil-speaking Malayali. Ravikumar agreed after initial reluctance and dyed his hair white to portray the character. The film's introductory credits shows the actors credited with their character names instead of their actual names. Malayalam actress Kulappulli Leela made her Tamil debut through this film.

=== Filming ===
Principal photography began on 1 June 1995. The first shooting schedule took place in Mysore. While filming the introductory song "Oruvan Oruvan", the team brought two horses via lorry to each place where the film was to be shot. Ravikumar did not want to allocate four or five days for filming the song; instead he "used up about 20–30 minutes every day at all the locations we shot at". After filming the opening scenes of the song, the team shot the climax scene involving a crowd of more than 5,000 people. Following this, scenes including Muthu's father were shot at the Lalitha Mahal. The rest of the film was shot at Travancore Palace in Madras (renamed Chennai in 1996), and Kerala. A blue skirt Meena had worn while shooting some scenes had faded as a result of her sitting under the "scorching" sunlight for so long, so an identical skirt was prepared before she began filming the "Kuluvalile" song sequence.

The song "Thillana Thillana" was shot at AVM Studios, during the final shooting schedule which took place alongside post-production. According to Ravikumar, the song's dance choreographer, B. H. Tharun Kumar, told him "he just needed one set on a single floor in AVM and that he'd change the colour of the set to suit the mood of the song. Everything – from the costumes of Rajini and Meena and dancers to the background – were matching". He added, "We'd pack up by night and the technicians would change the colour of the entire set overnight, and be ready for shoot at 7 am again. The top lights had already been fixed, so they'd do the other small lights and we will go for take by 9 am. We'll wrap up by 6 pm, and then, the technicians would start work on the colour of the set again". The introductory "Super Star" title card first used in Annaamalai (1992) was also used here.

== Music ==
Muthu's soundtrack was composed by A. R. Rahman, with lyrics written by Vairamuthu. It is the first film where Rahman, Rajinikanth and Ravikumar worked together. A Hindi version of the soundtrack, titled Muthu Maharaja, features lyrics by P. K. Mishra, whereas the Telugu soundtrack contains lyrics written by Bhuvana Chandra. The songs were recorded at the Panchathan Record Inn in Madras. The soundtrack was released on 8 October 1995 under the Pyramid label. The audio launch was held at Kalaivanar Arangam in Madras, where Rajinikanth, Kamal Haasan along with Ravikumar, Rahman and Vairamuthu unveiled the audio cassettes to the public. The songs from Muthu were later retained in its Kannada remake in 2004, Sahukara, though Rajesh Ramanath was credited for its music.

== Themes ==
Some critics have felt that the dialogue "Naan eppo varuven, epdi varuvennu yarukkum theriyathu. Aana vara vendiya nerathula correcta vandhuduven" (transl. Nobody knows when or how I will come, but I will come when the time is right) hinted at Rajinikanth's political aspirations. Writing for PopMatters, Ranjani Krishnakumar felt that Muthu singing "Katchiyellam ippo namakkedhukku, kaalathin kaiyyil adhu irukku" (transl. Why do we need a [political] party now; time will tell) also underlined Rajinikanth's political manoeuvres, while critic Naman Ramachandran feels Rajinikanth was actually dispelling rumours of him joining politics through those lyrics. Writing for Mint, Shoba Narayan said that Rajinikanth's heroines play to every traditional stereotype and cited Ranganayaki's name as an example, adding, "the names set the tone for the character."

== Release ==
Muthu was released on 23 October 1995, during the Diwali holiday frame, and began screening during the openings of Kuruthipunal and Chandralekha. In Madras, the film was distributed by Sivasakthi Pandian through Sivasakthi Movie Makers, and in Coimbatore by Tirupur Subramaniam. Though Ravikumar initially feared the film would fail since screenings were declining during the third week of its run at Udhayam Theatre, Rajinikanth was confident it would succeed; it ultimately ran there for over 88 days at full capacity and became a silver jubilee hit. According to an estimate by Sunita Raghu of The New Indian Express, the film grossed ₹13 crore (equivalent to ₹85 crore or US$8.8 million in 2026) in India. The film was dubbed into Telugu under the same title and Rajinikanth's voice was dubbed by Mano. It was also dubbed in Hindi as Muthu Maharaja.

=== Reception ===
Ananda Vikatan gave the film a rating of 42 out of 100, wrote that the film was consistent and described it as an engaging masala entertainer. The critic also praised the song sequences for their vibrancy. R. P. R. of Kalki felt the film was not as fast-paced as most Rajinikanth films, unsure whether this was the editor's fault or the writer's. He said the film put more emphasis on the songs than the dialogues. D. S. Ramanujam of The Hindu gave a mixed review, comparing it unfavourably to Thenmavin Kombath and criticising the "wishy-washy" screenplay, but appreciated the flashbacks focusing on Muthu's father and the cinematography. MM of The Indian Express wrote that Muthu had an "insipid" screenplay, criticised Rajinikanth's performance and the music, also feeling the film "mauled" the story of Thenmavin Kombath beyond recognition.

=== Accolades ===
Event	Award	Recipient	Ref.
Tamil Nadu State Film Awards	Best Actor	Rajinikanth	
Tamil Nadu State Film Awards	Best Lyricist	Vairamuthu	
Tamil Nadu State Film Awards	Best Choreographer	B. H. Tharun Kumar	
Cinema Express Awards	Best Actor – Tamil	Rajinikanth	
Film Fans Association Awards	Best Actor	Rajinikanth	
Kalasagar Awards	Best Actor	Rajinikanth	

== Japanese version ==
In 1996, Japanese film critic Jun Edoki discovered the film at a video shop in Little India, Singapore. He said, "[Muthu] was absolutely fascinating—even without subtitles". Edoki then approached several Japanese distributors, wanting release the film in Japan. Eventually, Xanadeux agreed to release it. In 1998, they released the film in Japan. It was given the Japanese title Muthu Odoru Maharaja (ムトゥ 踊るマハラジャ), meaning Muthu – The Dancing Maharaja.

Muthu Odoru Maharaja initially had a limited release, starting on 13 June 1998 at Cinema Rise in Tokyo's Shibuya district, where it completed a 23-week run. It sold 127,000 tickets and grossed ¥208 million ($1.59 million), becoming the theatre's highest-grossing film of 1998, with distributor Atsushi Ichikawa describing it as "the Titanic of the art theaters". It then received a nationwide release across 100 theatres, drawing nearly 250,000 in audiences and grossing ¥400 million ($3.06 million).

Prior to Muthu, the previous highest-grossing Indian film in Japan was the Hindi film Raju Ban Gaya Gentleman from 1992, which was released there in 1997. Muthu surpassed it and became the most successful Indian film in Japan, as well as 1998's top film in the category of independent "first-run show" theatres. The success of Raju Ban Gaya Gentleman and Muthu sparked a short-lived boom of Indian films released in Japan, ending in 1999. Muthu was also the second highest-grossing 1995 Indian film overseas, behind only another Hindi film, Dilwale Dulhania Le Jayenge. In 2022, the Telugu film RRR surpassed the gross collection of Muthu Odoru Maharaja and became the highest-grossing Indian film in Japan. On 14 December 2006, the then Prime Minister of India, Manmohan Singh, made a special note about the reach of Muthu in Japan during his speech at the National Diet of Japan.

== Re-releases ==
A 4K remaster of the film was released in Japan on 23 November 2018. Another restored version was released in India on 8 December 2023.

== Legacy ==
Muthu helped Rajinikanth and Meena gain a large fan following in Japan. The video for "Thillana Thillana" became famous for Meena's belly dance, which features many closeup shots of her navel. Meena danced to the song on an episode of the talk show Simply Kushboo. The film itself has been frequently aired on Sun TV and recorded large viewership there. As well, many dialogues attained popularity such as "Kedaikkaradhu kedaikkama irukkadhu. Kedaikkama irukardhu kedaikadhu", "Naan eppo varuven, epdi varuvennu yarukkum theriyathu. Aana vara vendiya nerathula correcta vandhuduven", and the Malayalam dialogue "Eruki anachu oru umma tharum" (transl. Hug me tight, and kiss me). Sivasakthi Pandian used the profits he made from distributing Muthu to finance his first film as a producer, Vaanmathi (1996).

The attire worn by Rajinikanth in "Kuluvalile" – a white shirt and lungi – became popular. A 100-second fight sequence from Muthu was used in the French film I Do (2006) with permission from Kavithalayaa Productions. In 2017, artist Rajesh Arachi released an English-language comic book adaptation of Muthu. It was published by Chelvam Comics. In the same year, a film tribute to Rajinikanth titled 12-12-1950 was released. The main characters are named after Rajinikanth's films, one of them being Muthu. In 2018, GRT Hotels in Chennai started creating dishes named after Rajinikanth's films, with one being named Muthu, consisting of "gun powder arancini in the shape of pearls". In early 2020, during the COVID-19 pandemic in India, a song spreading awareness about COVID-19, titled "Corona Corona" and set the tune of "Thillana Thillana", became viral.

A dialogue by Muthu, "Indha thummalu, irumalu, vikkalu, kottavi, nalladhu, kettadhu, pasi, thookkam, porappu, irappu, panam, pattam, padhavi, idhellam thaana varum. Vandhalumm yaennu ketka mudiyadhu. Ponalum thadukka mudiyathu" (transl. Cough, hiccups, yawning, good, bad, hunger, sleep, birth, death, money, title, position, all these things will come on their own. You cannot ask for them. If they come, you cannot ask why they came and if they go, neither can you complain about them.) was used by Suriya in his dubsmash for spreading awareness on voting rights in 2016.

== Bibliography ==
- Dhananjayan, G. (2011). The Best of Tamil Cinema, 1931 to 2010: 1977–2010. Galatta Media. ISBN 978-81-921043-0-0.
- Ramachandran, Naman, ed. (2012). Rajinikanth 12.12.12: A Birthday Special. Kasturi & Sons Ltd.
- Ramachandran, Naman (2014) [2012]. Rajinikanth: The Definitive Biography. Penguin Books. ISBN 978-0-14-342111-5.
