= Shihan Hussaini =

Indian actor (1958–2025)

- Born: 28 December 1958; Madurai, Madras State, India
- Died: 25 March 2025 (aged 66); Chennai, Tamil Nadu, India
- Occupations: Actor, karate expert, sculptor, artist, poet
- Years active: 1986–2025
- Family: Ishaq Hussaini (brother)
- Website: www.shihanhussaini.com

Shihan Hussaini (28 December 1958 – 25 March 2025) was an Indian martial artist and actor in who appeared in Tamil-language films. His brother Ishaq Hussaini has also appeared in Tamil films. He was also widely covered in Indian media for his acts of devotion towards politician Jayalalithaa and for his world record attempts.

== Career ==
=== Acting career ===
Shihan Hussaini rose to fame by his achievements as a karate instructor and set up a school to help young martial arts fighters. Hussaini made his acting debut through K. Balachander's romantic drama Punnagai Mannan, where he played a dancer who treats Revathi's character harshly as a result of her Sri Lankan heritage. The success of the film prompted filmmakers to sign him on to play the antagonist in Rajinikanth's Velaikaran (1987) and in R. K. Selvamani's shelved Moongil Kottai, which featured him alongside Vijayakanth. During the period in the late 1980s and early 1990s, he also worked on the Hollywood production Bloodstone (1988), the Karthik-starrer Unnai Solli Kutramillai (1990) and the Sarathkumar-starrer Vedan (1993). Other films he worked on included Naadodigal featuring Khushbu and Ravichandran's Santharpangal, though neither film was released.

Furthermore, he appeared in a film titled My India where he played the lead role alongside actresses Swathi and Vani Viswanath. His last on-screen appearance was in Badri, where he played Vijay's fitness coach and helped contribute to the making of the "Travelling Soldier" song. In March 2014, he revealed that he was working on the pre-production of a film titled Mudivu, while denying rumours that he was approached to act in Gautham Vasudev Menon's Yennai Arindhaal (2015).

=== Other ===
In 1998, he helped coordinate security for actor Kamal Haasan during the making of Marudhanayagam, and during the premiere shows of Shankar's Jeans (1998). As a devoted follower of politician Jayalalithaa, Shihan Hussaini painted 56 portraits of her using his blood to mark her 56th birthday in 2004. In February 2013, Hussaini unveiled a bust of Jayalalithaa's face using frozen blood. Hussaini claimed he had collected 11 litres of blood, and that his own was added to blood donated by his archery disciples, including women. Unruffled by critics who accused him of sycophancy, he maintained that his admiration for the politician was normal. In February 2015, Hussaini crucified himself wearing a T-shirt with ‘Amma’ on it, praying that Jayalalithaa won her upcoming elections. He remained hanging for more than six minutes after his associates pounded six-inch (15.24 cm) nails into his hands and feet. After the four nails were slowly pulled out, Hussaini was put in a waiting ambulance and taken to the ICU of a nearby hospital. His actions were widely described by commentators as "foolish".

In 2016, Shihan Hussaini was working as an archery coach and as the founder and general secretary of the Archery Association of Tamil Nadu, the only state archery body recognised and affiliated with the Tamil Nadu Olympic Association and the Archery Association of India.

Hussaini worked as a chef and hosted a television show in Mega TV, called Athiradi Samayal.

== Death ==
After suffering from blood cancer and a very rare condition called aplastic anaemia, Hussaini died on 25 March 2025 in Chennai, at the age of 66.

== Filmography ==
=== Film ===
Year	Film	Role	Notes
1986	Punnagai Mannan	Sri Lankan Tamil	
1987	Velaikkaran		
1988	Bloodstone	Street Vendor	English film; credited as Hussaini
1988	Paravaigal Palavitham		
1990	Unnai Solli Kutramillai	Dharmaraj	
1993	Vedan		
1997	My India		
2001	Badri	Vetri's coach	
2022	Kaathu Vaakula Rendu Kaadhal	Karate trainer	
2025	Chennai City Gangsters	Psycho Salim	Posthumous film

=== Television ===
Year	Title	Role	Channel	Notes	Ref.
2008	Athiradi Samayal	Anchor	Mega TV	Reality show	
2022	Vellum Thiramai	Judge	Colors Tamil	Reality show	
