= Mr. Romeo =

- Title card
- Directed by: K. S. Ravi
- Written by: Crazy Mohan (dialogues)
- Screenplay by: K. S. Ravi
- Story by: B. Ramesh
- Produced by: R. B. Choudary
- Starring: Prabhu Deva; Shilpa Shetty; Madhoo
- Cinematography: V. Manikandan
- Edited by: B. Ramesh
- Music by: A. R. Rahman
- Production company: Super Good Films
- Release date: 10 November 1996
- Running time: 162 minutes
- Country: India
- Language: Tamil

Mr. Romeo is a 1996 Indian Tamil-language action comedy film directed by K. S. Ravi and produced by R. B. Choudary. The film stars Prabhu Deva in a dual role with Shilpa Shetty and Madhoo playing the female leading roles, while Surendra Pal, Vadivelu, and Vijayakumar play supporting roles. It was released on 10 November 1996 and failed at the box office. The film marks Shetty's only Tamil film to date.

== Plot ==
In Bangalore, Romeo lives a privileged life as a celebrity with his widowed mother. He receives considerable assistance and encouragement from Sathyamoorthy to dance and sing. He meets and is attracted to Madhoo, who is also his fan. His mother meets with Madhoo's grandfather, and both arrange their wedding. Then Romeo finds out that Sathyamoorthy has been stealing body organs from patients in the Sathyamoorthy Hospital, and then stages their deaths via bus accidents. He meets with Sathyamoorthy and warns him that he is going to expose him publicly. Before he could reveal their activities, Romeo is shot and thrown off a cliff. His friend Prakash is framed for the murder and is sentenced to life imprisonment.

In Dharavi, Prakash's sister Shilpa comes across Madras, a poor funeral dancer who is a lookalike of Romeo, and convinces him to impersonate Romeo to clear her brother's name as well as to find the real perpetrator of the crime. After getting thrown off the cliff, Romeo is taken in by the tribals living in the hills and manages to survive. Upon finding Madras impersonating him, Romeo realises that Madras is his twin brother, long presumed dead. Using this to his advantage, he starts taking revenge on Sathyamoorthy. Meanwhile, Madras and Shilpa fall in love with each other. Madras and Romeo eventually expose Sathyamoorthy's illegal activities to the public, and Sathyamoorthy is sent to jail.

== Cast ==
- Prabhu Deva as Madras and Romeo
- Shilpa Shetty as Shilpa (voiced by actress Rohini)
- Madhoo as Madhoo
- Vadivelu as Vavval
- Vijayakumar as DGP Vijayakumar
- Surendra Pal as Sathyamoorthy
- Vennira Aadai Moorthy as Madhoo's grandfather
- Delhi Ganesh as Madras and Romeo's father
- Madhan Bob as Sabapathy
- Mohan Ram as Judge
- Kavitha as Madras and Romeo's mother
- Jyothi Meena as Indigenous woman
- Ajay Rathnam as Ajay
- Uday Prakash as Prakash
- Krishnamoorthy as Singaram
- A. K. Veerasamy as Vettiyan
- Chitraguptan as Kathirikka
- Radhabhai as Midwife
- K. S. Jayalakshmi as an Idli seller
- Crazy Mohan as Shop manager

== Production ==
Prabhu Deva signed the film after securing a blockbuster with Shankar's Kaadhalan (1994) and demanded ₹60 lakh (US$62,000) for his work in the film. Bollywood actress Shilpa Shetty was chosen to star in her first Tamil film, while Madhoo, who appeared in Mani Ratnam's Roja and Shankar's Gentleman was signed on to play second lead. The producer of the film asked the director, K. S. Ravi to be credited simply as Ravi in the film, to avoid confusion with another director K. S. Ravikumar. Mitchell camera weighed 50 kg was used for all the "double action" shots.

== Soundtrack ==
The music is scored by A. R. Rahman for the lyrics penned by Vaali and Vairamuthu, while the soundtrack was distributed by Pyramid AV International. The lyrics for the Hindi version were penned by Mehboob & P. K. Mishra.

Original Tamil Version

Song	Artist(s)	Lyrics	Length
"Romeo Aatam Potal"	Hariharan, Udit Narayan	Vaalee	5:25
"Yar Adhu?"	Noel James, Anto, Srinivas, Chandran	Vaalee	3:49
"Mel Isaiyae"	Swarnalatha, Unni Menon, Srinivas, Sujatha Mohan	Vaalee	5:40
"Thaneerai Kaadhalikum"	Sangeetha Sajith	Vairamuthu	3:42
"Muthu Muthu Mazhai"	Ila Arun, Chorus	Vairamuthu	6:21
"Mona Lisa"	Malaysia Vasudevan, Nagoor Mohammad Ali	Vaalee	5:58

Hindi Version (Mr. Romeo)

Song	Artist(s)	Length
"Romeo Teri Kismat"	Hariharan, Udit Narayan	5:25
"Kaun Hai Yeh Apsara"	Noel James, Anto, Srinivas, Chandran	3:49
"Mil Hi Gaye"	Swarnalatha, S. P. Balasubrahmanyam, Sadhana Sargam	5:40
"Machli Paani Bina"	Kavita Krishnamurthy	3:42
"Paas Aaja Baalam"	Ila Arun, Chorus	6:21
"Mona Lisa"	Sonu Nigam, Raqeeb Alam	5:58

Telugu version

Song	Artist(s)	Length
"Romeo Natyam Chesthe"	Hariharan, Udit Narayan	5:25
"Evaradhi Evaradhi"	Noel James, Anto, Srinivas, Chandran	3:49
"Mallikale Naa"	Swarnalatha, S. P. Balasubrahmanyam, Sujatha Mohan	5:40
"Egireti Asalani"	Sangeetha	3:42
"Arere Rang"	Ila Arun, Chorus	6:21
"Mona Lisa"	Malaysia Vasudevan, Srinivas	5:58

== Release and reception ==
The film was released on 10 November 1996, and failed to meet the expectations at the box office, becoming Prabhu Deva's second consecutive average after Love Birds.

A. R. Rahman played a role in recommending the director K. S. Ravi to work in En Swasa Kaatre, a production of Rahman's acquaintances. Mr. Romeo was also belatedly dubbed and released in Hindi and Telugu under the same title.
