= Ishaq Hussaini =

Indian actor

- Born: 25 November 1973 (age 52)
- Occupations: Actor, screenwriter, director, producer
- Years active: 1999–present
- Spouse: Yola
- Children: 1
- Family: Shihan Hussaini (brother)

Ishaq Hussaini (born 25 November 1973) is an Indian actor, screenwriter, director and producer who has worked in Tamil language films.

== Career ==
The brother of karate expert Shihan Hussaini, Ishaq Hussaini also has a third degree black belt in karate. He had gained a doctorate in literature from the City University, Los Angeles and that his Ph.D. thesis was a comparative study of French and English literature in the Romantic age. Ishaq Hussaini appeared in a series of films in the late 1990s and early 2000s. After getting an average response to Jayam (1999) where he portrayed a supporting role with Mansoor Ali Khan, he reunited with the same director duo, Ravi Raja, to make the family drama film, Kanmani Unakkaga (1999), which he scripted and produced in addition to starring opposite actress Suvalakshmi. Despite the low profile releases, Ishaq opted to continue his acting career in Chennai and signed up to act in films titled Kaadhal Jeyikkum and Sagotharaa in 2000, but the films did not release. After appearing with actress Abitha in the romantic drama Poove Pen Poove (2001), he collaborated again with Ravi-Raja for the film Idhayamae, which released in 2003, and a further time for Iyappa Saamy co-starring Pandiarajan.

A film titled Nenjirukkumvarai Ninaivirukkum featuring Hussaini alongside Livingston and Silpa Sivakumar was shot during 2003 and censored in 2008 but failed to have a theatrical release, before being later released straight to video. In the mid 2000s, he also worked on a film titled Boogambam, but the film did not materialise until 2024. A bilingual film titled Lemon began work in 2005 and was scheduled to have a release in 2012 after several delays.

Alongside his career in films, he was based out of Poland and set up the International American School of Warsaw.

== Filmography ==
Year	Film	Role	Notes
1999	Jayam	Vijay	
1999	Kanmani Unakkaga	Rishi	Also writer and producer
2001	Poove Pen Poove	Raja	also singer for song "Cococola"
2003	Idhayamae	Teja	
2006	Iyappa Saamy	Veluchamy	
2014	Nenjirukkumvarai Ninaivirukkum	Muthu	
2025	Boogambam	Sathya	Also director, writer, and producer
