= En Swasa Kaatre =

1999 film by K. S. Ravi

- DVD cover
- Directed by: K. S. Ravi
- Written by: K. S. Ravi
- Produced by: R. M. Sait; J. Ansar Ali
- Starring: Arvind Swamy; Isha Koppikar; Prakash Raj; Raghuvaran
- Cinematography: Arthur A. Wilson
- Edited by: Babu-Raghu
- Music by: A. R. Rahman
- Production company: Nikaba Films International
- Release date: 26 February 1999
- Running time: 177 minutes
- Country: India
- Language: Tamil

En Swasa Kaatre (transl. Breath of My Life) is a 1999 Indian Tamil-language romantic crime film written and directed by K. S. Ravi. The film stars Arvind Swamy and Isha Koppikar, while Raghuvaran, Prakash Raj and Thalaivasal Vijay play supporting roles. The film was produced by newcomers R. M. Sait and Ansar Ali, friends of composer A. R. Rahman. The film was released on 26 February 1999 and did average commercial business.

== Plot ==
A seemingly down-to-earth man, Arun, leads a life of a computer hacker by day and a thief by night. When he meets Madhu, whom he fancies, he wishes to turn over a new leaf. But Arun's rogue foster brother Guru, who has been blackmailing him since he was young to do his dirty deeds, does not think likewise. A deep love-hate relationship between them which unfolded during their childhood days, traps Arun into a life of crime. How Arun chooses between his family and love forms the crux of the story.

== Cast ==
- Arvind Swamy as Arun Raj
- Isha Koppikar as Madhu
- Prakash Raj as Guru
- Raghuvaran as Pandian
- Vadivelu
- Thalaivasal Vijay
- Devan as ACP
- Vennira Aadai Nirmala
- Chinni Jayanth
- Santhana Bharathi
- O. A. K. Sundar
- Priyanka as Lily
- Raju Sundaram as Raju (special appearance)
- Mink Brar as item number "Jumbalakka"
- Japan Kumar (special appearance in the song "Jumbalakka")
- Diya Mirza in a special appearance (uncredited)

== Production ==
In 1998, composer A. R. Rahman signed on to work with his friends R. M. Sait and Anwar Ali's Love Letter, with speculation suggesting that Rahman was producing this film along with his friends. Rahman suggested to his friends to instate K. S. Ravi as director, having previously worked with him in Mr. Romeo (1996). The project went through production troubles, with three of Arvind Swamy's projects at the time – Engineer, Mudhal Mudhalaaga and Sasanam – also in a similar situation. The film was soon retitled En Swasa Kaatre and was rumoured to be partially based on the Mission Impossible films. Isha Koppikar was meant to mark her debut with the film but the delays prompted her other films to release before En Swasa Kaatre. Director Kathir had scouted for an actress in North India to play the lead role in his venture Kadhalar Dhinam and had auditioned Isha Koppikar for the role. He subsequently recommended her to his friend K. S. Ravi to cast her in En Swasa Kaatre. Sonali Bendre replaced Kopikkar in Kadhalar Dhinam.

The film was also delayed due to a dispute between Arvind Swamy and Nikaba Films, the producers. Nikaba had omitted to pay Arvind Swamy's remuneration for acting in the film, and the actor promptly got a stay order on the release of the producer's next film Ooty.

== Music ==
The soundtrack was composed by A. R. Rahman. Parts of the song "En Swasa Katre" are syncopated as in Carnatic music compositions. In the Theendai song, Rahman had used a similar religious chant which had carnatic allusions like the ones in Enigma (Germany), which had Gregorian chants. The song "Jumbalakka" was reused in the Hindi film Thakshak. It was also featured in the 2019 film Kaithi where it became a trend in Tamil Nadu after its release. "Kadhal Niagra" was reused with change in instrumentation and vocals and with a considerable extend in length as "Kay Sera Sera" in Pukar. A slightly revised version of "Thirakatha" was a song that was used in the score of Million Dollar Arm. Due to Rahman's busy schedule, he left the project before completing the background score. Sabesh–Murali were signed to quickly compose the remaining score.

All lyrics are written by Vaalee; all music is composed by A. R. Rahman.

Track listing
No.	Title	Singer(s)	Length
1.	"Jumbalakka"	Rafee	6:20
2.	"Kadhal Niagara"	Palakkad Sreeram, Harini, Anupama	5:01
3.	"Thirakkatha Kattukulle"	P. Unnikrishnan, K. S. Chithra	7:09
4.	"En Swasa Katrae"	M. G. Sreekumar, K. S. Chithra	5:15
5.	"Chinna Chinna Mazhai Thuligal"	M. G. Sreekumar, K. S. Chithra	5:48
6.	"Theendai Mei Theendai"	S. P. Balasubrahmanyam, K. S. Chithra	6:48
Total length:			36:21

== Reception ==
Kala Krishnan Ramesh of Deccan Herald said that "the story of En Swasa Katre, is one with much potential, largely unexplored by an inadequate plot and screenplay, which, along with the dialogues, and direction, are by K S Ravi", with the critic adding that "Arvind Swamy is not bad, as for as an Arvind Swamy can be so. And the same goes for Prakash Raj. Worth taking a look at." Arul S. of The New Indian Express described that "En Swasa Kaatre may not be a must-see but it is certainly a can-see." K. N. Vijiyan of New Straits Times wrote "See this one if you are a Arvindswamy fan or go just to enjoy the visuals". D. S. Ramanujam of The Hindu wrote, "The cinematography of Arthur A. Wilson particularly the outdoor work in a song with a waterfall as backdrop and the elegant sets of Thotta Tharani are the plus points of this production", but was critical of the dance choreography. He added, "The incidents the director has created to tell the love story [...] have been handled with taste".

The film did average commercial business. Despite the relative high-profile nature of the film, K. S. Ravi disappeared from the film industry after the film's release and did not make any other films until his death in 2010.
