= Periya Kudumbam =

- Poster
- Directed by: K. S. Ravikumar
- Written by: Ramesh Khanna (dialogues)
- Screenplay by: K. S. Ravikumar
- Story by: Paruchuri brothers
- Produced by: Ravi Shankar
- Starring: Prabhu; Kanaka; Vineetha
- Cinematography: Ashok Rajan
- Edited by: K. Thanikachalam
- Music by: Ilaiyaraaja
- Production company: Ravi Shankar Films
- Distributed by: Gemini Film Circuit
- Release date: 1 September 1995
- Running time: 150 minutes
- Country: India
- Language: Tamil

Periya Kudumbam (transl. Big Family) is a 1995 Indian Tamil-language drama film, directed by K. S. Ravikumar. It stars Prabhu, Kanaka and Vineetha, with Manorama, Vijayakumar, Lakshmi, Chandrasekhar, Chithra, Goundamani and Senthil in supporting roles. The film was released on 1 September 1995. It is a remake of the Telugu film Thodi Kodallu (1994).

== Plot ==
The story revolves around three brothers, Rathinavel, Thangavel & Manickavel who lead a simple life. All attempts by their cousins to create tiffs amongst them fail, until they take advantage of a weak situation and join a group of people who have similar thoughts.

== Cast ==
- Prabhu as Rathnavel
- Kanaka as Jothi
- Vineetha as Bharathi
- Manorama as Sivagami
- Vijayakumar as Thangavel
- Lakshmi as Kasthuri
- Chandrasekhar as Manikkavel
- Chithra as Shanthi
- Goundamani as Post Master Kanthasamy
- Senthil as Post Man Dhandapani
- K. S. Ravikumar as Chinnapandi
- Kitty as Sundarapandi
- Ponnambalam as Veerapandi
- Thalapathi Dinesh as Dheenadayalan
- Vinu Chakravarthy as Minister Thandavarayan
- Sathyapriya as Rajalakshmi
- Vichithra as Pappamma
- Kalyan Kumar as Rajavel
- K. Kannan as Rajapandi
- Ramesh Khanna as Police Inspector
- Sathyakala as Rajapandi wife
- Crane Manohar as a beggar
- S. P. Rajkumar as a guy asking for Kunnakudi bus

== Soundtrack ==
The music was composed by Ilaiyaraaja.

Song	Singer(s)	Length	Lyrics
"Aakki Vecha Soru"	Mano, K. S. Chithra, Sunanda	4:27	Palani Bharathi
"Muchathu Maadapura"	Mano, K. S. Chithra	4:59	R. V. Udayakumar
"Hey Muthamma"	Mano, Malaysia Vasudevan, Sunanda	6:09	Vaali
"Raththatha"	Arunmozhi	5:00	Vaali
"Thatthi"	S. P. Balasubrahmanyam, K. S. Chithra	5:30	R. V. Udayakumar

== Reception ==
D. S. Ramanujam of The Hindu wrote, "The film is good in patches like director Ravikumar's direction".
