= Azhagarsamy =

- Title card
- Directed by: Sundar C
- Screenplay by: Sundar C
- Story by: R. Selvaraj
- Produced by: Malar Balu
- Starring: Sathyaraj; Roja
- Cinematography: U. K. Senthil Kumar
- Edited by: P. Sai Suresh
- Music by: Deva
- Production company: Malar Films
- Release date: 10 December 1999
- Running time: 140 minutes
- Country: India
- Language: Tamil

Azhagarsamy is a 1999 Indian Tamil-language drama film directed by Sundar C, who also wrote the screenplay. The film stars Sathyaraj and Roja. It was released on 10 December 1999.

== Plot ==
A rich landlord gave money to Thayama, a pregnant woman, to save her husband and she later swore to give her baby in return. Her husband died and she gave her baby.

Azhagarsamy was brought-up by the landlord and the landlord decides to marry Azhagarsamy to his daughter Suja, an arrogant city girl. Thayama begins to work in Azhagarsamy's house.

Later, Azhagarsamy marries Suja who hates and insults him every time. Vinu Chakravarthy who wants to grab Suja's property tries to give milk with poison to Suja who is pregnant. Thayamma who realises the problem sacrifices her life by drinking the milk and Azhagarsamy learns that Thayamma was his mother. In the end, Suja unites with Azhagarsamy.

== Cast ==
- Sathyaraj as Azhagu (Azhagarsamy)
- Roja as Suja
- Radha Ravi as Landlord
- Sujatha as Thayama
- Goundamani
- Senthil
- Vinu Chakravarthy
- Ponnambalam
- Madhan Bob
- Ra. Sankaran
- Halwa Vasu
- Singamuthu
- Periya Karuppu Thevar
- LIC Narasimhan
- Alphonsa (special appearance)

== Soundtrack ==
The music was composed by Deva, with lyrics written by Palani Bharathi.

| Song | Singer(s) | Duration |
|---|---|---|
| "Eranju Maadham" | Hariharan | 5:42 |
| "Kaalmellaam" (female) | Harini | 5:27 |
| "Kaalmellaam" (male) | P. Unni Krishnan | 5:27 |
| "Konjum Strawberry" | Anuradha Sriram, Malgudi Subha | 5:46 |
| "Orange Color" | Deva, Sujatha | 4:27 |
| "Pachchai Marikozhunthu" | Hariharan, Sujatha | 5:24 |
| "Pogathey Pogathey" | P. Unni Krishnan | 5:47 |

== Reception ==
K. N. Vijiyan of New Straits Times wrote, "If you fancy a family-oriented, old-fashioned story, with a touch of humour, then go for this one". T. Krithika Reddy of The Hindu wrote, "THE THEME has been done to death on celluloid. Yet director Sundar. C's sensitive touches invest the film with freshness". Chennai Online wrote "Satyaraj never gets tired of playing the same 'Strapping youth-falling-in-love' type of roles. Roja plays the haughty miss to the hilt. Radharavi gets a meaty role and makes the most of it. Sujatha, sidelined for the past few years, gets a role that gives her a lot of scope to emote and she does a fine job. And as for Goundamani, his shouting (read it as comedy) could have been heard across states".
