= K. S. Ravi =

Indian film director

- Born: 1959
- Died: September 6, 2010 (aged 51)
- Occupation: film director

K. S. Ravi (1959 –2010) was an Indian film director of Tamil and Telugu films. His films included a mixture of genres from dramas to action thrillers.

== Personal life ==
Ravi was born in 1959 in Paramakudi, Ramnad district. He was born to Mr. Karpurasundharam, an ex-serviceman, and Mrs. Vasantha Karpurasundharam. He has three siblings: Rajan, Kripakaran and Latha. He married Ms. Sumathy, and had a daughter named Aishwarya.

== Death ==
Ravi died of cardiac arrest on September 6, 2010.

== Awards ==
Ravi secured the most acclaimed "Nandi Award" for his first movie, Aagraham.

== Filmography ==
Year	Film	Language	Notes				
Year	Film	Language	Notes	1993	Aagraham	Telugu	Dubbed in Tamil as Evana Irundha Enakenna
1994	Honest Raj	Tamil					
1996	Mr. Romeo	Tamil	Dubbed in Telugu and Hindi				
1999	En Swasa Kaatre	Tamil					
