= Ullathai Killathe =

- Poster
- Directed by: Vejey Kannan
- Produced by: M. Sreedharan
- Starring: Suresh; Karan; Khushbu
- Cinematography: K. N. Raju
- Edited by: M. R. Srinivasan
- Music by: Deva
- Production company: Vijaya Cine Enterprises
- Release date: 6 March 1999
- Country: India
- Language: Tamil

Ullathai Killathe (transl. Don't pinch the heart) is a 1999 Indian Tamil-language drama film, written and directed by Vejey Kannan. The film stars Suresh, Karan and Khushbu, while Janagaraj and Senthil portray supporting roles. Music for the film was composed by Deva and the film was released on 6 March 1999.

== Cast ==
- Suresh as Raja
- Khushbu as Athmani
- Karan as Major Prakash
- Supraja
- Janagaraj as Chakravarthy
- Senthil
- Jai Ganesh
- Ajay Rathnam as Vinky
- Chinni Jayanth as Ganesh
- Kumarimuthu
- Ponnambalam
- Ramesh Khanna
- Singamuthu
- Kullamani
- Sathyapriya as Prakash's mother
- Kavitha
- Babilona
- Hamsa Devi
- Sonam

== Production ==
During production, the film was reported in the media as an attempted comeback for Khushbu.

== Soundtrack ==
Soundtrack was composed by Deva.

Song	Singers	Lyrics	Length
"Arcottu Saalaiyile"	Deva, Sabesh	Ponniyin Selvan	05:21
"Naan Musolini"	Naveen, Anuradha Sriram	Pa. Vijay	05:54
"Nee Engey"	Arunmozhi	Pa. Vijay	05:55
"O Nenje"	Swarnalatha	Pa. Vijay	05:55
"Oviyam Theetti Yavan"	Mano	Vaali	05:05
"Sona Sona Ruksona"	P. Unnikrishnan, Sujatha	Palani Bharathi	04:04

== Release ==
The film had begun production in January 1997 but had a delayed, low-profile release across Tamil Nadu in 1999.
