= Jayam (1999 film) =

- Directed by: Ravi-Raja
- Written by: Ravi-Raja
- Produced by: Ravi-Raja
- Starring: Sangita; Mansoor Ali Khan; Ishaq Hussaini; Vichithra
- Cinematography: Dayal Osho
- Edited by: N. Haribabu
- Music by: Pradeep Ravi
- Production company: Mahalakshmi Cine Circuit
- Release date: 15 October 1999
- Running time: 95 minutes
- Country: India
- Language: Tamil

Jayam is a 1999 Indian Tamil-language horror film directed and produced by the duo Ravi-Raja, making their directorial debut. The film stars Sangita, Mansoor Ali Khan, Ishaq Hussaini and Vichithra, with Bhavana, Ragul, Rocky, Karikalan, Shanmugasundaram and Vadivukkarasi playing supporting roles. It was released on 15 October 1999.

== Plot ==
The Tamil Nadu police are looking for professor Saamy, a mad scientist who committed multiple terrorist attacks in Tamil Nadu. The inspector of Police Rathnam, also an informer, informs each stage of the investigation to professor Saamy, thus Saamy managed to escape from the police each time. The commissioner of Police Sankar who handles the case, calls in Anand and Vijay to find and arrest Saamy. In the past, Anand and Vijay arrested Saamy but he was eventually released from jail thanks to his political influence. Saamy then kills Rathnam in his lab for an experiment, but the experiment went horribly wrong and Saamy dies on the spot.

The story shifts to a remote village where the villagers are mysteriously killed. Durga is a goddess believer and she is cherished by the villagers, she is the daughter of the village head Nattamai and Lakshmi. The rich landlord Mirasu hates Nattamai, and he wants to become the village head at any cost. In the meantime, Amudha, a journalist from Chennai, comes to write an article about the village and the religious beliefs, thereafter she becomes friend with Durga.

David and Mumtaj fall in love with each other, and only Durga knows about their love. Later, the young lovers are found dead in the forest by the villagers, and Mirasu blames Durga for killing them. Amudha stands by her side, she even promises to find the real culprit.

That night, Amudha is killed by a morbid creature in the forest. Anand and Vijay attempt to kill the creature but Vijay dies in the process and Anand ends up seriously wounded. To protect the village from the deadly creature, the villagers prepare a grand Puja. The creature then appears during the Puja and Durga destroys it with a trishula.

== Cast ==
- Sangita as Durga
- Mansoor Ali Khan as Anand
- Ishaq Hussaini as Vijay
- Vichithra as Amudha
- Bhavana as Mumtaj
- Ragul as David
- Rocky as Professor Samy
- Karikalan as Mirasu
- Shanmugasundaram as Nattamai
- Vadivukkarasi as Lakshmi
- K. K. Soundar as Rahim Bhai
- Prathapachandran
- Suryakanth as Inspector Rathnam
- Raviraj as Commissioner Sankar
- Loose Mohan as Kanakku
- Thideer Kannaiah

== Production ==
Ishaq Hussaini, brother of martial artist Shihan Hussaini, and a non-resident Indian based out of Poland, made his acting debut in the film.

== Soundtrack ==
The soundtrack was composed by Pradeep Ravi, with lyrics written by Vairamuthu, Pulamaipithan, Bharathan and Pradeep Ravi.

Song	Singer(s)	Duration
"Ayieram Kan Udaiyavale"	Sujatha Mohan	5:01
"Chikku Chikku"	Amrutha	4:56
"Piranthom Thanith Thaniye"	P. Unnikrishnan, Amrutha	6:04
"Sarithiram Maarantum Daa"	Rajkumar	3:18
"Nilavukku Ennadi"	Harini	4:40
