= Aniyan Bava Chetan Bava =

- VCD cover
- Directed by: Rajasenan
- Written by: Rafi Mecartin
- Produced by: Remis Raja; Nazeer Nettoor
- Starring: Jayaram; Narendra Prasad; Rajan P. Dev; Kasturi; Sangita
- Cinematography: Anandakuttan
- Edited by: K. P. Hariharaputhran
- Music by: S. P. Venkatesh
- Production company: Highness Arts
- Distributed by: Kavya Chandrika
- Release date: 9 January 1995
- Running time: 144 minutes
- Country: India
- Language: Malayalam

Aniyan Bava Chetan Bava (transl. Younger-brother Bava, elder-brother Bava) is a 1995 Indian Malayalam-language comedy-drama film directed by Rajasenan and written by Rafi Mecartin. It stars Jayaram, Narendra Prasad, Rajan P. Dev, Kasturi and Sangita. The movie was remade in Telugu as Subhamastu and in Tamil as Periya Idathu Mappillai, the latter starring Jayaram himself in the lead role. It was the debut movie of K. T. S. Padannayil.

== Plot ==
The film follows brothers Kuttan Bava/Chettan Bava and Kunjan Bava/Aniyan Bava, and their driver Premachandran, with whom the daughters of both the Bavas fall in love. This makes the Bavas enemies, and it becomes their issue of pride on who will marry Premachandran. On top of this includes Sundaran, the nephew of the Bavas trying to take Premachandran down.

== Cast ==
- Jayaram as Premachandran
- Narendra Prasad as Kuttan Bava (Chettan Bava)
- Rajan P. Dev as Kunjan Bava (Aniyan Bava)
- Kasturi as Amritha aka Ammu
- Sangita as Malavika aka Malu
- Prem Kumar as Sundaran
- Oduvil Unnikrishnan as Easwara Pillai
- Janardanan as Kottaram Veedan
- Rizabawa as Kannappan
- Appa Haja as Dassappan
- Indrans as Balan
- Meena as Sreedevi, Kunjan Bava's wife and Malu's mother
- Paravoor Bharathan as Premachandran's father
- Kanakalatha as Devi Thampuratti, Premachandran's mother
- K. T. S. Padannayil as Premachandran's great-grandfather
- Adoor Bhavani as Premachandran's great-grandmother
- M. S. Thripunithura as College Professor (Cameo)
- Reshmi Soman as Seetha, Premachandran's sister

=== Family Tree of Bava family ===
Rajan Bava
Kuttan Bava (Chettan Bava) | Lekshmi | Kunjan Bava (Aniyan Bava) | Sreedevi
Amritha/Ammu | Premachandran | Malavika/Malu | Sundaran

== Soundtrack ==
Aniyan Bava Chetan Bava's songs and background score were composed by S. P. Venkatesh, with lyrics by S. Ramesan Nair and I. S. Kundoor. The music album has 5 songs:

| Track | Song Title | Singer(s) |
|---|---|---|
| 1 | "Mazhavil Kodiyil" | Biju Narayanan, K. S. Chitra |
| 2 | "Mazhavil Kodiyil" (f) | K. S. Chitra |
| 3 | "Mizhineerin Kaayal" | Biju Narayanan |
| 4 | "Mizhineerin Kaayal" | K. J. Yesudas |
| 5 | "Pulari Pookkalal" | P. Jayachandran, K. S. Chitra |

== Remakes ==
The film was remade in Telugu as Shubhamastu (1995) and in Tamil as Periya Idathu Mappillai (1997) with Jayaram.

== Box office ==
The film was declared a hit. The film ran for more than 100 days in theaters
