= Thai Maaman =

1994 film by Praga

- Theatrical release poster
- Directed by: Guru Dhanapal
- Screenplay by: Guru Dhanapal
- Story by: Anumohan
- Produced by: M. G. Sekar; S. Santhanam
- Starring: Sathyaraj; Meena
- Cinematography: B. Bhalamurugan
- Edited by: B. Lenin; V. T. Vijayan
- Music by: Deva
- Production company: M. G. Pictures
- Release date: 16 September 1994
- Running time: 150 minutes
- Country: India
- Language: Tamil

Thai Maaman (transl. Maternal uncle) is a 1994 Indian Tamil-language political satire film directed by Guru Dhanapal, starring Sathyaraj and Meena. It was released on 16 September 1994.

== Plot ==
Rasappan is a wealthy but irresponsible landlord in a village, who is in love with his niece Meena, an educated girl. Their parents decide their betrothal, but Meena refuses to marry as Rasappan is jobless. Rasappan challenges them to find a decent job. Rasappan's uncle advises him to become a MLA. Rasappan joins Paramasivan's political party and contests in MLA election against his uncle Velusamy. Paramasivan is cruel and decides to loot public money if Rasappan wins in his party. But Rasappan feels bad opposing his uncle and campaigns electors to vote for Velusamy instead of him. But Rasappan unexpectedly wins the election.

Rasappan becomes an honest MLA and helps his village people. He convinces the villagers to deposit their money in a new bank, which is promoted by Paramasivan's relative. Paramasivan and his relative loot all the deposited money and escape, which lands Rasappan in trouble. Rasappan is immediately jailed. Villagers burn Rasappan's house and steal his properties. Velusamy bails him out, Rasappan retrieves the money, returns it to the villagers, and then sends Paramasivan and his partner to jail. Then Rasappan goes to Chennai to resign as MLA, but the Chief Minister congratulates Rasappan for his honesty and promotes him as the new minister for Home and Police. Back in his village, Paramasivan's henchmen attempt to kill him, but they fail. Meena agrees to marry Rasappan.

== Cast ==
- Sathyaraj as Rasappan
- Meena as Meena
- Goundamani as Rasappan's uncle
- Vijayakumar as Velusamy
- Manivannan as Paramasivan
- Vadivukkarasi as Rasappan's mother
- Thalapathy Dinesh as alcohol warehouse's proprietor
- Senthil
- Ponnambalam
- Vichu Vishwanath
- M. N. Nambiar as Arivudai Nambi, Chief Minister of Tamil Nadu
- Manobala in a guest appearance
- Seetha as Rasappan's sister

== Soundtrack ==
The soundtrack was composed by Deva.

Song	Singers	Lyrics	Length
"Aazha Samuthiram"	P. Jayachandran	Vairamuthu	03:36
"Amman Kovil"	S. P. Balasubrahmanyam, K. S. Chithra	Vairamuthu	04:59
"Enga Kulasamy"	S. P. Balasubrahmanyam, K. S. Chithra	Vairamuthu	04:43
"Kettele Oru Kelvi"	S. P. Balasubrahmanyam	Vairamuthu	04:54
"Kongunaattukku"	S. P. Balasubrahmanyam	Kalidasan	05:09

== Release and reception ==
Thai Maaman was released on 16 September 1994. Malini Mannath wrote in The Indian Express, "[Thai Maaman] has turned out to be an engrossing entertainer that keeps you in splits for most of the time and thoughtful and ruminating for the rest." Thulasi of Kalki felt Meena was underutilised, but appreciated the film's fast pace while also appreciating cinematography in song "Amman Kovil" and editing but panned the film for too many messages.
