= Maran (actor) =

Indian actor and singer (1972–2021)

- Born: Manimaran; 4 June 1972; Chengalpattu, Tamil Nadu, India
- Died: 12 May 2021 (aged 48); Chengalpattu, Tamil Nadu, India
- Other names: Ghilli Maran, Chengalpattu Maran
- Occupation: actor
- Years active: 2001–2021
- Known for: Ghilli

Maran also known as Ghilli Maran (4 June 1972 – 12 May 2021) was an Indian actor and singer who primarily featured as a comedian in films.

== Personal life ==
He was born in Naththam, Chengalpet district. He was married to Clara Manimaran and the couple have a daughter.

== Career ==
He made his big-screen debut in the 2001 film Rishi, playing a minor role. He then played the role of a kabaddi player in Dharani's directorial Ghilli (2004) which became a box office success. He is known for playing the role of Vijay's friend in the sports drama film. Maran's performance as a henchman in Thalainagaram was also lauded by audience where he featured alongside veteran comedian Vadivelu. He was seen posthumously in film Sarpatta Parambarai and Anti Indian.

In addition, he had also performed gaana songs at concerts at his home town.

== Filmography ==
- All films are in Tamil, unless otherwise noted.

Year	Film	Role	Notes
2001	Rishi		Uncredited role
2002	Ezhumalai	Anandaraj's henchman	
2004	Ghilli	Aadivasi	
2006	Dishyum	Maran	
2006	Thalainagaram	Henchman who argues with Naai Sekar	
2007	Thee Nagar	Henchman	
2007	Deepavali	Fisherman	
2007	Marudhamalai	Henchman	
2008	Kuruvi		
2008	Pathu Pathu	Pickpocket	
2009	Vettaikaran	Ravi's friend	
2010	Maanja Velu	Henchman	
2010	Boss Engira Bhaskaran		
2011	Mappillai	Ravi	
2011	Vandhaan Vendraan		
2013	Chandhamama		
2013	Pattathu Yaanai		
2014	Maan Karate	Boxer	
2015	Kaththukkutti	Arivazhagan's friend	
2016	Velainu Vandhutta Vellaikaaran		
2016	Kaththi Sandai	Deva's henchman	
2017	Julieum 4 Perum		
2018	KGF: Chapter 1		Kannada film
2019	Sangathamizhan	Raghu	
2021	Sarpatta Parambarai	Maanja Kannan	Posthumous release
2021	Anti Indian		Posthumous release

== Death ==
Maran died on 12 May 2021 at the age of 48 due to COVID-19. He underwent treatment at the Chengalpet Government Hospital where he was hospitalized two days prior to his death.
