= Snehamante Idera =

2001 film by Balasekaran

- Theatrical release poster
- Directed by: Balasekaran
- Written by: Chintapalli Ramana (dialogues)
- Screenplay by: Balasekaran
- Story by: Siddique
- Based on: Friends (Malayalam)
- Produced by: R. B. Choudary
- Starring: Nagarjuna Akkineni; Sumanth; Sudhakar; Bhumika Chawla; Prathyusha
- Cinematography: Shyam K. Naidu
- Edited by: Nandamuri Hari
- Music by: Shiva Shankar
- Production company: Super Good Films
- Release date: 26 October 2001
- Running time: 179 minutes
- Country: India
- Language: Telugu

Snehamante Idera (transl. This is what friendship is) is a 2001 Indian Telugu-language buddy comedy drama film produced by R. B. Choudary under the Super Good Films banner and directed by Balasekaran. It stars Nagarjuna Akkineni, Sumanth, Sudhakar, Bhumika Chawla and Prathyusha, with music composed by Shiva Shankar. It is the Telugu remake of the Malayalam film Friends. Though it is remade from the Malayalam original, the Telugu version mostly retained the format of the film's Tamil version. It was dubbed into Hindi in 2007 as Naya Jigar.

== Plot ==
Aravind (Nagarjuna Akkineni), Chandru (Sumanth) and Krishna Murthy "Kimoo" (Sudhakar) have been best friends since childhood. They value friendship above everything else, including family. Chandru, is an orphan, who has stayed with Aravind and is regarded by Aravind's parents as a second son. Aravind's sister Amrutha (Prathyusha) falls in love with Chandru. Chandru is hesitant as she is the sister of his best friend. Chandru seeks the help of Kimoo to avoid Amrutha. Some brushes with the law force Aravindan and Chandru to lie low in Hyderabad for a couple of days, where they and Kimoo take up jobs as painters in a mansion under contractor Bhavani Shankar (Brahmanandam), who is Kimoo's paternal uncle. Aravind falls in love with Padmini (Bhumika Chawla), who lives in the mansion, though Padmini only considers him as a friend; nevertheless, she is grateful to him when he saves her from accidental electrocution.

However, Padmini's cousin, Swathi (Abhinayashree) has a crush on Aravind and is enraged when she realizes that he is in love with her Padmini. Swathi sends false letters to him in Padmini's name, making him believe that his love is reciprocated. So, when Padmini suddenly gets engaged to another man, Chandru stands up for Aravind's love and insults Padmini in front of her entire family, causing her engagement to get canceled. This makes Padmini decide to marry Aravind but to take revenge on Chandru by breaking his and Aravind's friendship. But during their marriage, Aravind and Padmini realize that Swathi is behind all the mishaps which had taken place and that Chandru is innocent. Padmini reconciles with Chandru, and Chandru's and Amrutha's wedding is fixed.

Gowtham (Sriman) is Aravind's cousin who lusts for Amrutha. He plans to separate Aravind and Chandru so that he can marry Amrutha. He first sets Amrutha's sari on fire while she is cooking in the kitchen. Chandru blames Padmini for the mishap as she was in the kitchen with Amrutha at the time, even though Padmini is innocent, no one, including Aravind, believes Chandru. Gowtham, then, turns his eye on the annual bullock race in which Chandru is taking part, by loosening the wheels on Chandru's cart to cause a serious accident and frame Padmini as the culprit, thus creating a wedge between Chandru and Aravind. Unfortunately for Gowtham, Aravind decides to take part in the race in Chandru's place since Chandru is to be married, and manages to win despite using the broken bullock cart.

Chandru accuses Padmini of trying to kill him. Padmini threatens to leave the house if Aravind remains friends with Chandru and does not throw him out of the house. Aravind then reveals to her that he had accidentally killed Chandru's deaf-and-dumb younger brother (Master Abhinai) when they were children, which traumatized him so much that he never told anyone about it. Since then, he has been looking out for Chandru out of the guilt that he had no one else in his life anymore. Gowtham overhears their conversation and tells Chandru about it to anger him. Chandru fights with Aravind, breaks their friendship, and leaves the house. Aravind tries to convince Chandru to return and marry Amrutha, even if he cannot repair their friendship. However, in the process, Aravind falls from a cliff and seemingly dies. Although Chandru tries to save Aravind, he blames himself for Aravind's fall. Chandru later realizes that his brother was accidentally killed and that Aravind was not intentionally at fault.

Five years later, Chandru is a Major in the Indian Army and has never returned to Aravind's home since his supposed death. He receives a letter from Kimoo stating that Aravind is not dead, but in a vegetative state, not responding to anyone and only sitting in a corner. Chandru immediately leaves for Aravind's house, where he also learns that Aravind and Padmini have a young son whose name is Chandru, in tribute to their friendship. Meanwhile, Gowtham, who has been torturing Padmini and Amrutha since Aravind went into the vegetative state, finds out that Chandru has returned and beats him up. On hearing Chandru's cries, Aravind wakes up and subdues Gowtham and his goons. In the end, Aravind, Chandru, and Krishnamurthy, as well as Aravind and Padmini, and Chandru and Amrutha, are reunited happily.

== Cast ==
- Nagarjuna Akkineni as Aravind
- Sumanth as Chandru
- Sudhakar as Krishna Murthy "Kimoo"
- Bhumika Chawla as Padmini
- Prathyusha as Amrutha
- Abhinayashree as Swathi
- Brahmanandam as Bhavani Shankar
- Ali as Gopal
- Sriman as Gowtham, Aravind's cousin
- Venu Madhav as worker in Bhavani Shankar's group
- Tanikella Bharani as Manager Appalaraju
- Chalapathi Rao as Aravind's father
- Sangeetha as Aravind's mother
- Giri Babu as Aravind's uncle and Gautham's father
- Sathyapriya as Aravind's aunt and Gautham's mother
- Jaya Prakash Reddy as Padmini's uncle
- Shanoor Sana as Padmini's aunt
- Rama Prabha as Padmini's grandmother
- Saraswatamma as Aravind's grandmother
- Narra Venkateswara Rao as Padmini's father's friend
- Rami Reddy as Puliraju
- Lakshmi Rathan as Padmini's father
- Ramatherdha
- Gautham Raju as Watchman
- Telangana Shakuntala as wife of man that Chandru beats up
- Gadiraju Subba Rao
- Lakhamshetty Nageswara Rao
- Ruthika as Ratna
- Master Abhinai as Chinna
- Master Kireeti as Young Aravind
- Master Tanush as Young Chandru
- Master Vijay as Young Kimoo
- Baby Kavya as Young Amrutha
- Besant Ravi as Henchman

== Production ==
R. R. Shinde was originally chosen to direct the film but due to health problems he was replaced by Balasekaran. The film began production on 2 July 2001 and was launched at Annapurna Studios on the same day.

== Soundtrack ==
Snehamante Idera

Film score by Shiva Shankar
- Released: 2001
- Genre: Soundtrack
- Length: 29:41
- Label: Aditya Music
- Producer: Shiva Shankar

The music was composed by Shiva Shankar. Music released on Aditya Music Company. "Rukku Rukku" from the Tamil version composed by Ilayaraja was remade here. The songs "Cheliya" and "Kanne Pillale" were remade from Shiva Shankar's own Tamil songs "Malare Oru Vaarthai" and "Kannai Parikira" which he composed for Tamil film Poomagal Oorvalam. Shiva Shankar later reused "Naa Pedaviki" as "Nee Malarai" for Tamil film Arputham.

No.	Title	Lyrics	Singer(s)	Length
1.	"Snehamante Idera"	Kulasekhar	Shankar Mahadevan, Tippu, Krishna Raj	4:46
2.	"Cheliya Nee Premalone"	Mryutyamjayudu	Hariharan, Sujatha	5:01
3.	"Kanne Pillale"	Chirravuri Vijaykumar	Udit Narayan, Sujatha	5:02
4.	"Naa Pedaviki Navvulu"	Chirravuri Vijaykumar	Rajesh, Sujatha	4:34
5.	"Rukku Rukku"	Chirravuri Vijaykumar	Devan, Sowmya	5:26
6.	"Nesthama Nesthama"	Kulasekhar	Hariharan	4:39
Total length:				29:41

== Reception ==
A critic from The Hindu wrote that "Sumanth, in the role of Chandrakanth, proves to be a mature artiste. In fact, he gets more footage, compared to Nagarjuna. His diction at times resembles the diction of his maternal grandfather ANR. Nagarjuna, comparatively, has a linear role of a flirt and then a man besotted with the beauty of Padmini. Bhoomika's performance is comparatively mild, falling short of demand. Music by Sankar is marked by few good songs. Dance and fight sequences are the plus points of the film".

Jeevi of Idlebrain.com rated the film two-and-three quarters out of four and wrote that "First half of the film is very good. Second half of the film bad and dragged to no end. This 3-hour long film makes to feel bored in the second half. This film proved that the friendship films do not work out in Telugu like they do in Tamil and Malayalam". Andhra Today wrote "Good story, well conceived screen-play and unexpected twists and turns hold the audience in its grip. The director has fully utilized the first half for entertainment while the second half with its gripping story, ties the audience to their chairs. The conception of some scenes, make it seem as if they are from an experienced director".

A critic from Full Hyderabad wrote that "You might be entertained in the first half, but man oh man, the second [half] butchers the flick!" A critic from Sify wrote that "On the whole screenplay and direction is very shabby". A critic from Zamin Ryot wrote that "Their [Aravind and Chandrakanth's] friendship grows to the point of giving life, falling into unexpected situations, and coming together in an interesting way. All of these scenes look interesting. There is good opportunity for entertainment". Telugu Cinema wrote "The film has strong Tamil style of screenplay where the story runs on a series of incidents which makes the film not only lengthy but also sagging some times. It has considerably lengthy comedy track that succeeded many times. For all the artists in the film the roles are catwalk The chemistry between Nagarjuna and Sumanth gelled well. The music doesn't match the other Super Good films. All the other technical departments too are average".
