= Pray for Nesamani =

Internet meme

- Friends character
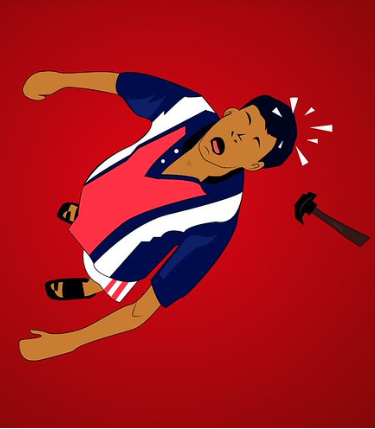
- One of the many Pray for Nesamani memes that illustrate the moment Nesamani is hit in the head by a hammer in the Tamil film Friends (2001).
- First appearance: May 2019
- Based on: Friends
- Portrayed by: Vadivelu

In-universe information
- Gender: Male
- Nationality: Indian

Pray for Nesamani (/ˈneɪsəməni/ sometimes spelled Naesamani) is an internet meme that began trending on social media platforms in May 2019. It is based on the fictional character Nesamani from the Indian Tamil comedy-drama film Friends (2001). Nesamani was played by actor Vadivelu, whose image is used in many of the memes attached to the hashtag #Pray_for_Nesamani and a series of related hashtags. It became the top trending hashtag on Twitter in India during the week, beating #ModiSarkar2, which was previously the nationally top trending hashtag referring to the recent 2019 Indian general election and the 23rd Ministry of the Republic of India.

== Background ==
Friends is a 2001 Indian Tamil-language drama film directed by Siddique. The film is a remake of the director's own Malayalam-language film of the same name which released in 1999. The supporting character Nesamani's scenes form a comedy subplot in the film, which was based on a similar subplot featuring Jagathy Sreekumar in the original.

Nesamani, played by Vadivelu, receives a painting contract at a zamindar palace. He and his employees are joined by his assistant Gopal (Charle), his nephew Krishnamoorthy (Ramesh Kanna), and Krishnamoorthy's friends Aravindan (Vijay) and Chandru (Suriya) who join as apprentices. Nesamani constantly yells at Krishnamoorthy and his friends for their poor workmanship and for unwittingly landing him in mishaps which run him the risk of losing the contract. In the midst of one of Nesamani's angry outbursts, Krishnamoorthy accidentally drops a hammer from above which lands on Nesamani's head. Although Nesamani is knocked out from initial impact, the friends eventually revive him. A fed up Nesamani bans the three friends from assisting in any further work.

Vadivelu, known for his career as a comedic film actor, is a celebrity in the Indian state of Tamil Nadu and has been the subject of several memes among Tamil-speaking internet users. Many of his past performances and dialogues, including those from Friends, were incorporated in several other social and political memes and immediately became a viral sensation.

== Trending ==
Trending of the hashtag started on 27 May 2019 from a page on Facebook called Civil Engineering Learners, where a user posted a photo of a hammer and asked its followers "what is the name of this tool in your country?". One user replied with the comment "Suthiyal", the Tamil word for hammer, and recalled the scene from Friends adding without providing context that "contractor Nesamani's head was broken... with it". Another commenter who understood the reference joined in the joke and replied, "Is he ok?". The conversation regarding Nesamani in the comments section expanded as users created and posted memes captioned "Pray for Nesamani". The memes featured screenshots of the scene of Vadivelu portraying Nesamani after the impact by the hammer. The images were coupled with fictitious screenshots of Twitter posts from world leaders and organizations expressing concerns and condolences for Nesamani. The memes were instantly viral on Twitter and Instagram. YouTube links of the scene where the hammer falls on Nesamani were dubbed as "CCTV footage of Krishnamoorthy attacking Nesamani".

The hashtag #Pray_For_Nesamani became the top trending hashtag on Twitter in India during the week, beating #ModiSarkar2, which was another nationally trending hashtag regarding the recent 2019 Indian general election and the 23rd Ministry of the Republic of India. Related hashtags, including #nesamani, #contractor_nesamani, #arrest_krishnamoorthy and #we_stand_with_govaalu, the latter two referring to the characters Krishnamoorthy and Gopal, also became popular.

Celebrities, including Harbhajan Singh, Ravichandran Ashwin, Siddharth, and Samantha Ruth Prabhu, took part in the joke by including the hashtag in their posts on their social media pages. Sony Music South and Amazon Prime Video India posted video links to the scene in the film. Other corporate organizations who created Pray for Nesamani memes include the Chennai Super Kings, Netflix India, AirAsia India, Nippon Paint India and Amul.

The Chennai Metropolitan Police used the hashtag to promote helmet use while operating two-wheelers.

== Reaction ==
Initially unaware, Vadivelu was notified by The News Minute and responded to the memes saying, "This entire trend is a victory given by God, a victory for the movie's director Siddique and the victory for the people who enjoy my comedy."

While the memes were viral in Tamil Nadu and largely recognized among the Tamil diaspora, it led to confusion among the rest of India and Internet users around the world who were unfamiliar with Vadivelu or the film.

== Political impact ==
The New Indian Express noted that the viral nature of #Pray_For_Nesamani on Twitter may have been a race to dethrone the hashtag #ModiSarkar2 from the top position of trending topics. The latter was used in online commentaries and discussions pertaining to the 2019 Indian general election, in which Narendra Modi was re-elected for a second term as the Prime Minister of India. Some Twitter users taking part in the Pray for Nesamani trend added the prefix Contractor to their display names and encouraged others to do so. The act of prefixing Contractor to their names was in reference to Modi and the supporters of the Bharatiya Janata Party who incorporated Chowkidar, the Hindi word for watchman, in their Twitter display names during the election campaign.
