= Cameo Films =

Indian motion picture company

- Type: Private
- Industry: Film
- Founded: 2013
- Founders: C. J. Jayakumar
- Headquarters: Chennai, Tamil Nadu, India
- Products: Film production, distribution

Cameo Films is an Indian film production and distribution company based in Chennai, Tamil Nadu. It was incorporated in the year 2013 by C. J. Jayakumar. Since then, it has produced three Tamil films, Damaal Dumeel, Trisha Illana Nayanthara, Imaikkaa Nodigal and distributed Kaththi Sandai.

== History ==
Cameo Films was incorporated by C. J. Jayakumar in 2013. Its first production was Shree's Damaal Dumeel starring Vaibhav Reddy and Remya Nambeesan. Their next production was the 2015 film Trisha Illana Nayanthara, directed by Adhik Ravichandran starring G. V. Prakash Kumar. The company then went on to distribute the 2016 film Kaththi Sandai, directed by Suraj starring Vishal and Tamannaah. In 2018, they produced Nayanthara and Anurag Kashyap starring Imaikkaa Nodigal, directed by R. Ajay Gnanamuthu. In 2019, the company established a Digital Content Workstream for producing web series and web films.

== Filmography ==
Year	Title	Director	Production	Distribution
2014	Damaal Dumeel	Shree	✓	
2015	Trisha Illana Nayanthara	Adhik Ravichandran	✓	
2016	Kaththi Sandai	Suraj		✓
2018	Imaikkaa Nodigal	R. Ajay Gnanamuthu	✓	
