= Kunguma Pottu Gounder =

2001 film directed by Suraj

- VCD cover
- Directed by: G. Saisuresh
- Screenplay by: G. Saisuresh
- Story by: T. K. Maheswar
- Produced by: G. N. Vishnuram
- Starring: Sathyaraj; Rambha
- Cinematography: D. Shankar
- Edited by: R. Sureshrajan
- Music by: Sirpy
- Production company: Ganga Gowri Productions
- Release date: 8 June 2001
- Country: India
- Language: Tamil

Kunguma Pottu Gounder (transl. Gounder with kunguma) is a 2001 Indian Tamil-language comedy drama film directed by Suraj, credited as G. Saisuresh. The film stars Sathyaraj and Rambha, with Kausalya, Karan, Mouli and Goundamani in supporting roles. It was released on 8 June 2001. The film was remade in Kannada as Mutthu (2002).

== Plot ==
In desperation to enroll his son in a good school, Kandasamy takes the help of an educated woman to pose as his son's mother. Problems arise when Kandasamy's wife finds it out.

== Cast ==
- Sathyaraj as Kandasamy and Kunguma Pottu Gounder
- Rambha as Alamelu
- Kausalya as Saraswati
- Goundamani as Chinnasamy
- Karan as Shiva
- Ramesh Khanna as Paramasivam
- T. S. B. K. Moulee as School principal and Shiva's brother
- Vinu Chakravarthy as Alamelu's father
- Pandu as Sundaram Pillai
- Sindhu as School teacher
- Balu Anand as Textile shop owner
- Bayilvan Ranganathan as Police inspector
- Vichu Viswanath as Lawyer
- Master Kaushik as Sakthivel, Kandasamy's son
- Master Bharath as young Kandasamy
- Suryakanth
- Kalidoss
- Arulmani
- MLA Thangaraj
- Omakuchi Narasimhan
- Gowthami Vembunathan
- Priyanka as Saraswati's friend
- Soundar as Munusamy
- Lekhasri in a special appearance
- Radhika Chaudhari in a special appearance

== Production ==
Kunguma Pottu Gounder was directed by Suraj under the name G. Saisuresh after Moovendhar (1998). The film's story was written by T. K. Maheshwar while Shankar handled the cinematography.

== Soundtrack ==
The soundtrack was composed by Sirpy. Though the song "Izhuthu Izhuthu" was picturised in the film it was not featured instead it was featured in dubbed film Thilak.

Song	Singers	Lyrics
"Azhagan Ponnu"	Mano	Palani Bharathi
"Kozhi Kuzhambu"	Krishnaraj	Palani Bharathi
"Mudhal Mudhala"	P. Unnikrishnan, Anuradha Sriram	Palani Bharathi
"Izhuthu Izhuthu"	Mano, Anuradha Sriram	Palani Bharathi
"Poovum Kaatrum"	P. Unnikrishnan	Ra. Ravishankar

== Reception ==
Malathi Rangarajan of The Hindu praised the comic exchanges of Sathyaraj and Goundamani and said, "despite fairly good acting and appealing dialogue the film does not make an impact, it is the pitfalls in the story and screenplay that are to be blamed". Visual Dasan of Kalki gave the film a verdict of "average". Malini Mannath wrote in Chennai Online, "The message that the director intended to convey, about the importance of education and the stringent rules certain prestigious schools follow, is diluted as the director shuttles between the comic and the serious, and gives more importance to the marital discord and the jealous wife story". Dinakaran wrote "Telling a serious story in a lighter vein is a novel technique adopted by the film's director Sai Suresh. Things would have been better had he told the story in a more clear-cut manner!".
