= Thalainagaram =

- DVD cover
- Directed by: Suraj
- Screenplay by: Suraj
- Story by: T. Damodaran
- Based on: Abhimanyu by Priyadarshan
- Produced by: V. Ravichandran
- Starring: Sundar C Jyothirmayi
- Cinematography: K. S. Selvaraj
- Edited by: Mu. Kasi Viswanath
- Music by: D. Imman
- Production company: Aascar Film Pvt. Ltd
- Release date: 19 May 2006
- Running time: 156 minutes
- Country: India
- Language: Tamil

Thalainagaram (transl. Capital city) is a 2006 Indian Tamil-language gangster action film written and directed by Suraj and produced by V. Ravichandran. The film stars Sundar C in his lead acting debut and Jyothirmayi, while Vadivelu, Prakash Raj, Judo. K. K. Rathnam, K. S. Ravikumar, and Bose Venkat play supporting roles. The soundtrack was composed by D. Imman, cinematography was handled by K. S. Selvaraj and editing by Mu. Kasi Viswanath.

The film is an unofficial remake of the 1991 Malayalam film Abhimanyu, The film tells the story of a man who sacrifices his life to kick out gangsters who ruin other's lives.

The film was followed by Naai Sekar Returns (2022), a comedy spin-off of Vadivelu's character in the film, and a standalone sequel Thalainagaram 2 (2023).

== Plot ==
Subramaniam alias Right (Sundar C) is a rowdy in North Chennai. He runs a separate gang and also works as a sidekick and right-hand man to a big time don named Qaasim Bhai (Judo. K. K. Rathnam) who resides in North Chennai. Qaasim Bhai uses Right and his gang as professional killers whenever required. ACP Ravikumar (K. S. Ravikumar) believes in his own type of law by eliminating criminals instead of wasting time by the court and other procedures. Divya (Jyothimayi) a student, surprisingly enters into Right's life and takes shelter in his house. However, things change after she enters his life; both of them fall in love. At a situation, there arises a clash between Right and Qaasim Bhai. Right's friend Balu (Bose Venkat) kills Qaasim Bhai's son Nassir (Vikas Rishi) for ordering a trucker who rams a convoy which killed innocent children instead of only killing the intended target. Unfortunately, Balu is killed by Qaasim Bhai for killing Nassir. After seeing Balu's death, Right decides to change his lifestyle.

Parallel narration is the track of Naai Shekar (Vadivelu), Divya's supposed uncle who wants to become a criminal.

For Right's surprise enters a corrupt ACP named Gopinath (Prakash Raj). He is on a hell bent quest to eradicate crime. He dislikes Right's attitude to leave the underworld and threatens Divya, who is molested in prison. After coming to know of this, Right decides to eliminate all of his foes once and for all. He hatches a plan and orders a sniper shooter (Vichu Vishwanath) to kill the police inspector of the station. He also orders a trucker (G. K.) and kills the lady inspector. Right kills Gopinath and then plans to kill Qaasim Bhai for Balu's death. Qassim Bhai arrives at the hotel, where he sees his wife Vaani's (Bhuvaneswari) wristwatch in the bedroom, which was previously gifted to him by the corrupt MLA (Delhi Ganesh). Qassim Bhai mistakenly kills the MLA for having an affair with Vani. Right then strangulates Qassim Bhai when he arrives at the basement to board his car. Finally, Right arrives at the dock for a getaway with Divya only to be killed by a battalion of police officers due to the betrayal by Sashi (Sashikumar), his own fellow gang member who mistakenly thinks that Right was behind his sister's suicide.

== Cast ==
- Sundar C as Subramaniam alias Right
- Jyothirmayi as Divya
- Vadivelu as Naai Sekar
- Prakash Raj as ACP Gopinath
- K. S. Ravikumar as ACP Ravikumar
- Delhi Ganesh as Corrupt Minister
- Judo. K. K. Rathnam as Qassim Bhai
- Bose Venkat as Balu
- Mayilsamy as Naai Sekar's assistant
- Vichu Vishwanath as Right's gang member
- Manobala as Police Inspector
- Sashikumar as Sasi
- Nellai Siva as Police Constable
- Chelladurai as Barber
- Bava Lakshmanan as a victim
- Jasper as Right's gang member
- Halwa Vasu as a psycho
- Munnar Ramesh as Right's gang member
- Imman Annachi as Right's gang member
- Singamuthu as a psycho
- Kottai Perumal
- M. J. Shriram as a police officer
- Vijay Ganesh as a psycho
- Maran as Henchman
- Funky Shankar as a victim
- Bhuvaneswari as Vaani, Qassim Bhai's trophy wife
- Sonia as Balu's wife
- Master Sachin as Balu's son
- Master Soundarapandian
- Master Saravanakumar

Uncredited

- Mumaith Khan as an item number in "Soo Manthrakaali"
- Vengal Rao as a person in the gorilla cell
- Omakuchi Narasimhan as a man smoking cigarette
- Babilona as Sasi's sister
- Vikash Rishi as Nassir
- G. K. as a truck driver
- Sai Dheena as Qassim Bhai's henchman

== Production ==
Thalainagaram marked Sundar C's acting debut as a lead actor. Since the story is based in Chennai, it was shot in and around places like Ayodhyakuppam and Royapuram.

== Soundtrack ==
The music is composed by D. Imman.

Track listing
No.	Title	Lyrics	Singer(s)	Length
1.	"City of Sins"	P. Vijay	Vasu, Naveen, Vijay, Rahul Nambiar
2.	"Flames of Victory"	D. Imman	D. Imman, Mathangi
3.	"Madi Madi"	Na. Muthukumar	Balram, Srilekha Parthasarathy
4.	"Naan Valargirena"	Palani Bharathi	Anuradha Sriram
5.	"Soo Manthrakaali"	P. Vijay	Sujeetha Menon, Funky Shankar, Sangeetha Sajith
6.	"Yedho Ninaikiren"	Na. Muthukumar	Manjari, Devan

== Reception ==
Sify wrote "On the whole Thalainagaram lacks substance and is worth a skip." Cinesouth wrote "Even though director Suraaj makes many mistakes, his attempt to make a time worn story line into a commercial film must be commended." Lajjavathi of Kalki wrote they have moved the film without any loss of vivacity from scene to scene. Even though it is a story that has already been handled by many people, there is a freshness to it while praising Vadiveli's humour, Jyothirmayi's acting but felt Sundar's innocent face didn't suit the gangster's role and passed muster in the role. Malini Mannath of Chennai Online wrote "It's all predictable situations that we have seen before. The script is loosely etched in the second half and the narration tends to lag. Also the director's idea of intercutting the present with frequent long cuts to the past distracts, and is likely to confuse a viewer. A straight narrative style would have helped better".

== Box office ==
The film collected a distributor share of Rs 4 to 5 crores at the box office.

== Legacy ==
Vadivelu's dialogue "Trisha illana Divya" (transl. If Not Trisha, Then Divya) inspired the title of a 2015 film Trisha Illana Nayanthara. The film was remade in Telugu as Nagaram (2008). The character Naai Sekar performed by Vadivelu attained cult status. Suraj, who directed this film, made a spin-off film on the character titled Naai Sekar Returns, which released in 2022 and had Vadivelu reprising his role as Naai Sekar. A standalone sequel titled Thalainagaram 2, directed by V. Z. Durai, was released in 2023.
