= Damaal Dumeel =

2014 Indian film by Sree

- Theatrical release poster
- Directed by: Shree
- Produced by: C J Jayakumar
- Starring: Vaibhav; Remya Nambeesan
- Cinematography: A. M. Edwin Sakay
- Edited by: Paramesh Krishna
- Music by: S. Thaman
- Production company: Cameo Films
- Release date: 18 April 2014
- Running time: 118 minutes
- Country: India
- Language: Tamil

Damaal Dumeel is a 2014 Indian Tamil-language black comedy-thriller film directed by Sree and produced by C J Jayakumar. The film features Vaibhav and Remya Nambeesan in the leading roles, while Sayaji Shinde and Kota Srinivasa Rao play pivotal roles. The film was released on 18 April 2014 to mostly positive reviews. The film was dubbed and released in Telugu as Dhana Dhan in 2016.

== Plot ==
Moneykandan is an IT guy who spells his name as 'Money,' and like his name, money is an important driving force in his life, as he dreams of getting his sister married and making his mother happy. He has a loving girlfriend Meera, and life seems to be one big party for him. However his life takes a U-turn when he suddenly gets fired from his job. One day, by mistake, a box arrives at his doorstep containing Rs. 5 Crores, which is a part of settlement between two bad guys: Ilavarasu and Kamatchi Sundaram. Moneykandan wants to run away with the money and start a new life in another country, but he finds that he has caught a tiger by the tail.

== Cast ==
- Vaibhav as Moneykandan
- Remya Nambeesan as Meera
- Sayaji Shinde as Kamatchi Sundaram
- Kota Srinivasa Rao as Ilavarasu
- Charle as Selvam, security guard
- Manobala
- Yogi Babu as Kamatchi's henchman
- Venkat Sundar as Vasanth
- Praveen Kumar as Krishna
- Mippu
- Deepika Kamaiah as item number

== Production ==
The film was launched in a low scale function on 23 August 2013 at the AVM Studios, Chennai with veteran director K. Balachander being the guest of honour. Sree, the debutant director, began working on the script after apprenticing under Shankar during the production of Enthiran, and noted that the film would star Vaibhav and Remya Nambeesan. He revealed that it would be a dark comedy thriller film, with Vaibhav portraying a software engineer. The director reported in November 2013 that 85 percent of the film was complete, with only songs left to be shot. Thaman recorded a song with the lead actress Remya Nambeesan for the soundtrack. Deepika Kamaiah did a special appearance in a club number along with Vaibhav and Remya and she shot for the song at a popular club in Bangalore.

== Soundtrack ==
Damaal Dumeel

Soundtrack album by S. Thaman
- Released: February 2014
- Recorded: 2014
- Genre: Film soundtrack
- Length: 17:59
- Language: Tamil
- Label: Sony Music India
- Producer: S. Thaman

S. Thaman chronology
Race Gurram (2014)	Damaal Dumeel (2014)	Vaalu (2014)

The soundtrack album was composed by S. Thaman.

Track-List
No.	Title	Lyrics	Singer(s)	Length
1.	"Damaal Dumeel" (Instrumental)			1:31
2.	"Dumeel"	Karunakaran	Usha Uthup	4:01
3.	"Odi Odi"	Na. Muthukumar	Shankar Mahadevan	3:45
4.	"Pogadhae Pogadhae"	Thamarai	Remya Nambeesan	4:20
5.	"Saga Saga"	Madhan Karky	Naveen Madhav, Andrea Jeremiah	4:22
Total length:				17:59

== Release ==
The film opened to predominantly positive reviews on 18 April 2014. Sify wrote, "Sree has come out with a thriller comedy that seldom loses its grip. Credible performances from its leads and a nail-biting screenplay makes it an engaging trip. Damaal Dumeel is an enjoyable and racy fun ride". M Suganth of The Times of India, giving the film 3 stars out of 5, termed the film "a worthy attempt" and further wrote, "Right in the opening shot [sic] we realize that we are in the hands of a competent filmmaker and Sree keeps things moving at a brisk pace till the end. Even the romantic track is used only in small doses and the director doesn't allow a possible melancholic moment to linger". IANS also gave 3 stars out of 5 and called it "a reasonably good dark comedy that you seldom see from an industry that has an urge for predominantly making masala entertainers". Behindwoods gave 2.5 stars out of 5 and wrote, "Unlike the usual commercial masala that we get to watch every second Friday, Damaal Dumeel slips into the crux of the story right after the public service advertisement on smoking is played and clutches onto it right till the end. The movie has an interesting combination of dark comedy and titillation and the actions of the characters that appear in the film are quite unpredictable".

Some critics gave a more mixed review. Baradwaj Rangan from The Hindu wrote, "This is ...one of those films that you need to keep watching keeping this caveat in mind: “For a first-time filmmaker...” Sree has some clever ideas...The problem, as with a lot of Tamil cinema, is the distance between intent and execution. On the face of it — if we look at just the plot summaries — we seem to be doing wonderfully fresh and exciting work. But the ideas in the filmmakers’ heads lose steam when put on paper and, thereon, are translated to screen". Deccan Chronicle wrote, "The film is good in parts. Right from the start there's pace – something that is refreshing. The build up to the climax, interspersed with some laughs thanks to Charlie are notable". Rediff gave 2 stars out of 5 and wrote, Damaal Dumeel captures the attention of the viewer at the start and also maintains a healthy pace, but one feels let down. The film doesn't convey a sense of the desperation of the situation and of all hell breaking lose. Despite its faults, the film is engaging in parts".
