= Naai Sekar Returns =

2022 Indian film directed by Suraj

- Theatrical release poster
- Directed by: Suraj
- Written by: Suraj
- Produced by: Subaskaran Allirajah
- Starring: Vadivelu; Anandaraj; Rao Ramesh
- Cinematography: Vignesh Vasu
- Edited by: Selva R. K
- Music by: Santhosh Narayanan
- Production company: Lyca Productions
- Release date: 9 December 2022
- Running time: 140 minutes
- Country: India
- Language: Tamil

Naai Sekar Returns is a 2022 Indian Tamil-language comedy film produced by Subaskaran Allirajah and written and directed by Suraj. The film stars Vadivelu in his comeback film after five years, while Anandaraj, Rao Ramesh, and Redin Kingsley play supporting roles. The film's music is composed by Santhosh Narayanan. The film is a spin-off of Vadivelu's character in Suraj's film Thalai Nagaram (2006). The film was released theatrically on 9 December 2022 to mostly negative reviews from critics.

== Plot ==
In 1989, Natrajan, his wife, and his mother-in-law visit the God Bairava temple to request the God for a child, since Natarajan and his wife have no children. Just then, a saint visits the temple in shelter from the storm. Natrajan and his family make an offering of prasad to him. After hearing their story of having no child, he gifts them a husky, saying that it is not an ordinary dog; it has powers that will solve their problems and give them wealth. The sayings of the saint became true: Natrajan's wife falls pregnant and gives birth to a male child, and Natrajan's family becomes rich through his lorry business. They name the dog Bhairavar.

In the present day, Naai Sekar is a petty criminal who collects ransom money by kidnapping the dogs of the rich. While attempting to kidnap a rich man's dog, he accidentally kidnaps local gangster Dass's dog. However, he manages to collect a ransom from Dass, but when Dass's henchmen find Sekar and his gang, they beat them. Sekar's gang struggles to escape from Dass; in the fight, Dass gets accidentally shot in the groin by Sekar. In fear of getting killed by Dass or his henchmen, they are plans to go to Kerala. Sekar's grandmother scolds them and tells him about his family's history.

Soon after Sekar's birth, his family hired a servant named Meganathan to take care of Bhairavar. Max kidnaps the dog after learning about its good fortune from a drunk Natarajan. After losing the dog, their family's state became bad: Sekar's mother dies and Natarajan never came back from searching for his dog. So Sekar goes to Lala Palace in Hyderabad to get the dog from Meganathan, who is now a rich man under the name Max. Sekar discovers that Max is looking for a blind man to marry his sister Bobby. So he pretends to be blind to enter the palace and kidnap the dog. Eventually, he witnesses Max murdering his girlfriend Gora. He eventually passes Max's tests and earns his approval. He sets the wedding on Friday and requests him to invite all his friends and relations. He invites his two friends.

Dass gets discharged from the hospital and finds out that Sekar is in Hyderabad from Surangani. Later, Sekar kidnaps his dog "Jackie" and is just about to escape when Max catches him. Sekar says that "Jackie" is his dog Bhairavar and he has come to take his dog. Max takes out his gun, but Bhairavar blocks him, causing Sekar to take the gun and shoot Max in the same manner and spot he shot Dass. When the henchmen are about to attack Sekar, a police officer Arumugam arrives at Lala Palace to arrest Sekar, but Sekar cleverly informs Arumugam about Dass's and Max's crimes and has them arrested. Sekar then reunites with Bhairavar, and they both drive out of Lala Palace.

== Cast ==
- Vadivelu as Naai Sekar
- Anandaraj as Dass
- Rao Ramesh as Meganathan a.k.a. Max
- Redin Kingsley as Raakozhi, Sekar’s assistant
- Munishkanth as Inspector Arumugam
- Manobala as Naamakatti Narayanan
- Lollu Sabha Maaran as Raakozhi's friend
- Shivani Narayanan as Bobby, Meganathan’s sister
- Sivaangi Krishnakumar as Surangani Ambal
- Sanjana Singh as Gora, Meganathan's girlfriend
- Vela Ramamoorthy as Natarajan, Sekar’s father
- Sachu as Sekar’s grandmother
- Poochi Murugan as Murugan
- K. S. G. Venkatesh as Saint
- T. M. Karthik as Babloo
- Jangiri Madhumitha as Babloo’s wife
- Meena Vemuri as Narayanan's wife
- Ranjana Naachiyar as Sekar’s mother
- Thangadurai as Thangadurai
- Prashanth Rangaswamy as Kundan
- KPY Ramar as Kozhi Bhaskar
- KPY Bala as Singadurai
- Ashok Pandian as Vinoth Mishra
- Vengal Rao as Monkey Rao
- Boys Rajan as Judge
- Pradeep K. Vijayan
- Lollu Sabha Seshu as Hariharan
- ACP Ramesh
- Suraj as Police commissioner

== Production ==
When the red card issued to Vadivelu was lifted, the actor announced his next film with director Suraj.

The film was bankrolled by Allirajah Subaskaran under the banner Lyca Productions. The film was expected to be titled 'Naai Sekar' but went for an alteration in the title. Vadivelu and director Suraj first united for Thalai Nagaram, and the comic character 'Naai Sekar' in the film became popular. So, the team planned to name the character name as the title of the film. But the title was registered by production house AGS Entertainment, which stars Sathish. After a lot of discussions, the AGS production house still kept their film as Naai Sekar. So the makers had to go for an alteration in the title and finalised Naai Sekar Returns as the new title.

In an interview, comedian Redin Kingsley confirmed that he is in the film.

== Music ==
Naai Sekar Returns

Soundtrack album by Santhosh Narayanan
- Released: 2022
- Recorded: 2022
- Genre: Feature film soundtrack
- Length: 11:02
- Label: Think Music
- Producer: Santhosh Narayanan

Santhosh Narayanan chronology
Anel Meley Pani Thuli (2022)	Naai Sekar Returns (2022)	Dasara (2023)

The film's music is composed by Santhosh Narayanan in his first collaboration with Vadivelu and Suraj. The first single "Appatha" was released on 14 November 2022. The second single "Panakkaran" was released on 26 November 2022. The third single titled "Decent Aana Aalu" was released on 6 December 2022.

Track listing
No.	Title	Lyrics	Singer(s)	Length
1.	"Appatha"	Asal Kolaar, Durai	Vadivelu, Santhosh Narayanan, Asal Kolaar	4:47
2.	"Panakkaran"	Vivek	Vadivelu	3:55
3.	"Decent Aana Aalu"	Durai	Vadivelu	3:00
Total length:				11:02

== Release ==
=== Theatrical ===
The film was released in theatres on 9 December 2022. Initially, the film was expected to be released on 11 November 2022, however, the release date was postponed.

=== Home media ===
The post theatrical streaming rights of the film were sold to Netflix, while the satellite rights of the film were sold to Sun TV.

== Reception ==
The film received an underwhelming response from critics. Logesh Balachandran of The Times of India gave the film 2.5 out of 5 stars and wrote "Naai Sekar Returns might not be the best return for Vadivelu but for atleast [sic] now that he is back, we hope better roles bring out the better performer in him."

A critic for India Herald wrote "Vadivelu could have actually made a comeback that would have been remembered by all of his fans with better writing and screenplay. Unfortunately! No, not now." Kirubhakar Purushothaman of The Indian Express gave the film 1.5 out of 5 and wrote "It was indeed amusing that Suraj decides to do away with songs in such a lazy film." Srivatsan S of The Hindu wrote "There are so many possibilities one can think of with Vadivelu as the lead. A competent filmmaker can make our very own Johnny English series with Vadivelu. Kalyani Pandian of ABP Live gave the film 2.5 out of 5 stars and wrote "The truth that stands out here is that Suraj did not set that right field."

Sruthi Ganapathy Raman of Film Companion wrote "Vadivelu in fact goes on to slip in some of his most beloved dialogues into his lines. But all this does is make us smile sadly, filling us with nostalgia of his mythos that we once knew and enjoyed." A critic for News18 wrote "But it is a pity that there is no comedy in this movie with Vadivelu as the hero." Khalillulah of Hindu Tamil Thisai wrote "On the whole Vadivelu's 'Naai Sekar' is meant to stay in the mind of the audience, but it goes beyond a few comedic scenes and doesn't hold much sway." Shameena Parveen of Samayam Tamil gave the film 2.5 out of 5 stars and wrote "Naai Sekar Returns does not lend a hand to Vadivelu. Let's hope that he entertains us with great roles from now on."

Aarthi V of Hindustan Times wrote "Fans are eagerly waiting for Vadivelu to entertain us like before by playing great roles." Bharathy Singaravel of The News Minute gave the film 1 out of 5 stars and wrote "It would have been a far more fitting comeback for a star, so inseparable from Tamil movie culture, than Naai Sekar Returns."

Avinash Ramachandran of Cinema Express gave the film 2 out of 5 stars and wrote "But to paraphrase his own dialogue, “Avarukku end-e kidaiyaadhu,” and that throne is still waiting for him to return and sprawl all over it." A critic for Cinema Vikatan wrote "Some of the funniest sets required for a comedy film are enjoyable. Cinematographer Vignesh Vasu and cinematographer Selva RK were not tasked with the film."
