= Anti Indian =

2021 Indian film by C. Elamaran

- Theatrical release poster
- Directed by: C.Elamaran
- Written by: C.Elamaran
- Produced by: Aadham Bava
- Starring: Blue Sattai Maran; Aadukalam Naren; Radha Ravi
- Cinematography: Kathiravan
- Edited by: R. Sudharsan
- Music by: Elamaran
- Release date: 10 December 2021
- Running time: 119 minutes
- Country: India
- Language: Tamil

Anti Indian is a 2021 Indian Tamil-language political satire film written and directed by C. Elamaran and produced by Aadham Bava. The film stars himself, Radha Ravi, Aadukalam Naren, 'Vazhakku En' Muthuraman, Velu Prabhakaran, Ghilli Maran, and Suresh Chakravarthy. The film was released on 10 December 2021.

== Plot ==
Baasha, a film critic, dies just few days before the assembly by-election for Mylapore constituency while the election campaign by the political parties are in full swing. Various obstacles faced to bury the deceased are revealed.

== Cast ==
- Blue Sattai Maran as Basha
- Aadukalam Naren as Deputy Commissioner
- Radha Ravi as Mr. Senguttuvan, Chief Minister
- Vazhakku En Muthuraman as Inspector
- Suresh Chakravarthi as Tahsildar
- Jayaraj as Ezhumalai
- Karna Raja as Raja, Politician
- KPY Bala as Shamiana Boy
- Pasi Sathya as Saroja's Friend
- Sneba as Church Father
- Ghilli Maran as Black Shirt Guy
- Durai Sudhakar as Ruling Party Candidate
- Velu Prabhakaran as Hajiyar
- Lollu Sabha Seshu as Baasha's Uncle

== See also ==
- Anti-Indian sentiment

== Certification ==
The Central Board of Film Certification has refused to certify this film. Blue Shirt Maran submitted his film to the Revising Committee in Bengaluru for review on 5 April 2021 and their decision was conveyed to him on the same day. The makers of the film are said to have been asked by the Revising Committee of the Censor Board to make 38 changes. After Udta Punjab and Padmavat, Anti Indian is said to be the film to have faced these many cuts from the revising committee. The film makers filed a case in the court, which after hearing the arguments, the court dismissed the recommendations of the earlier teams of the Censor Board and directed to constitute a fresh committee and asked them to issue an appropriate certificate with proper cuts. Following this, a fresh committee watched the film and cleared it with a U/A certificate, suggesting only three small corrections.

== Reception ==
Kirubhakar Purushothaman of New Indian Express wrote that "The craft is straightforward. With a limited budget, Maran has pulled off a decent film that isn’t worried about nuances. No aesthetic brilliance, no compositions that draw attention. It may be technically inferior, but the content makes up for this.". M Suganth of Times of india rated 3 out of 5 and wrote that "Maran's use of inter-cutting many of the scenes with gaana doesn't work as well as intended as after a point, it starts to feel like a way to stretch the running time to two hours."
