= Pathu Pathu =

- Directed by: Sathyam
- Written by: Sathyam
- Produced by: Rajeswari Gnanasambandam
- Starring: Sona Heiden; Thalaivasal Vijay; Bose Venkat
- Cinematography: Sri Ganesan
- Edited by: M. Jayakumar
- Music by: L. V. Ganesan
- Production company: Indian Dream Makers
- Release date: 25 July 2008
- Running time: 120 minutes
- Country: India
- Language: Tamil

Pathu Pathu (transl. Ten Past Ten) is a 2008 Tamil language erotic thriller film written and directed by Sathyam. The film stars Sona Heiden, Thalaivasal Vijay and Bose Venkat, with Krishna, Sanjith, Chengalpattu Maran, Padma Narayanan, Manimaran, Swaminathan and Ashish playing supporting roles. The film, produced by Rajeswari Gnanasambandam, had music by L. Vaidyanathan's son L. V. Ganesan and was released on 25 July 2008. The film was dubbed into Telugu as Madanmohini.

== Plot ==
The film begins with the dead body of cinema director Subbu being found lying in a suitcase under a bridge. The tough police inspector Venkat is assigned to unravel the mystery behind the death.

Venkat first interrogates advocate Valli for killing him. She confesses to him that she had found Subbu's dead body in her kitchen yesterday night and put him in a suitcase. She blames her archenemy, P. T. Arun, a film producer, for murdering him. P. T. Arun then confesses that he and his assistant Kannan attempted to kill Valli by poisoning her milk but failed. According to the forensic report, the fingerprints of the three suspects didn't match the fingerprints taken on the body. Venkat then arrests a funeral dancer who fought with Subbu in a public place and a dumb pickpocket, but soon, he realizes that they are innocents. His investigation leads to Subbu's wife, Mohini, and she reveals everything.

Subbu was a lofty film director who struggled to deliver a hit film; he was known for being short-tempered and getting into trouble easily. With his entire focus centered on his profession, he failed to care for his sexually frustrated wife, Mohini. When the college student Vinoth entered his house for the stay, Sona and Vinoth became closer, thus having an illegal affair. When Subbu learned of the affair, he was devastated and left the house.

Later, an eyewitness admits that he has seen Subbu fighting with Nizam Ali the night of the murder. When the police chase him, Nizam Ali dies in a motorbike accident. The lack of further clues means the murder investigation ended, and the murder case remains unsolved.

== Cast ==
- Sona Heiden as Mohini
- Thalaivasal Vijay as Subbu
- Bose Venkat as Venkat
- Krishna as P. T. Arun
- Sanjith as Nizam Ali
- Chengalpattu Maran as Pickpocket
- Padma Narayanan as Advocate Valli
- Manimaran as Funeral dancer
- Swaminathan as Kannan
- Ashish as Vinoth
- Munnar Ramesh as Inspector Ravi
- Raviraj as Kanagasabai
- Manager Cheena as Venkat's father
- Rajadurai
- Harshavardhan
- Sarathbabu
- Vasu Sathish
- Poochi Senthil
- Rubachandran
- Arumbakka Soundararajan
- S. I. Kumar
- Abhinayashree in a special appearance
- Bhoomika in a special appearance
- Priyanka in a special appearance
- Laksha in a special appearance

== Production ==
Engineer turned director Sathyam made his debut with the soft erotic thriller Pathu Pathu under Indian Dream Makers banner. Actress Sona Heiden was selected to play the role of a housewife who eyes a young relative of hers with lustful leys, and the film had Sanjith, Bose Venkat and Thalaivasal Vijay playing significant roles. L. V. Ganesan, the son of veteran musician L. Vaidyanathan, scored for the film.

== Soundtrack ==
Pathu Pathu

Soundtrack album by L. V. Ganesan
- Released: 21 March 2008
- Recorded: 2008
- Genre: Feature film soundtrack
- Length: 23:09
- Label: Pyramid Saimira Music
- Producer: L. V. Ganesan

L. V. Ganesan chronology
Pathu Pathu (2008)	Theeyavan (2008)

The film score and the soundtrack were composed by L. V. Ganesan. The soundtrack, released on 21 March 2008, features 5 tracks with lyrics written by Yugabharathi, Muthu Vijayan, and J. Saleeem.

Track	Song	Singer(s)	Duration
1	"Alibaba Alibaba"	Sangeetha	4:41
2	"Malla Malla"	Vinaya	4:54
3	"Pallavaram Parankey"	Chinnaponnu	4:11
4	"Poovum Poovum"	Vinaya	4:24
5	"Vaada Vaada"	Roshini	4:59

== Release ==
The film was released on 25 July 2008 alongside another erotic film Sutta Pazham. The two films releasing that week were butchered by the censor board and carries 'A' certificates as they had an overdose of sex and smutty dialogues.

=== Critical reception ===
Sify rated the film as "titillating" and said, "The film is strictly for audiences who are looking at skin show and sleaze". Another critic stated, "this film implies of good efforts from the director and has a good message for the society that at present is comprised of annoying morals" and called it "average". S. Viswanath of Deccan Herald wrote, "Pathu Pathu is an engaging entertainer that has audiences in thrall stitching a moralistic tale of Fatal Attraction and Basic Instinct". Another reviewer stated, "Pathu Pathu's screen time runs for a crisp two hours and has a limited cast. Though the storyline is interesting, director Sathyam has banked on heroine Sona's glamour instead of utilizing its strength. Unfortunately, the overdose fails to strike a chord with the audience".

=== Box office ===
The film had completed its 100 days of run in Tamil and Malayalam languages. The film was dubbed into Telugu as Madanmohini and was released on 9 March 2012 by producer R. G. under Siri Meghana Creations banner.
