= Sakalakala Vallavan (2015 film) =

2015 Indian film by Suraj

- Theatrical release poster
- Directed by: Suraj
- Written by: Suraj
- Produced by: K. Muralidharan; V. Swaminathan; G. Venugopal
- Starring: Ravi Mohan; Trisha Krishnan; Anjali; Prabhu; Soori; Vivek
- Cinematography: U. K. Senthil Kumar
- Edited by: Selva R. K.
- Music by: Thaman S
- Production company: Lakshmi Movie Makers
- Release date: 31 July 2015
- Running time: 151 minutes
- Country: India
- Language: Tamil

Sakalakala Vallavan (transl. The master of all arts) is a 2015 Indian Tamil-language romantic action comedy film written and directed by Suraj. The film stars Ravi Mohan (credited as Jayam Ravi), Trisha Krishnan and Anjali, while Prabhu, Soori and Vivek appear in supporting roles. Thaman S composed the music, while cinematography was by U. K. Senthil Kumar and editing by Selva RK. The film, originally titled Appatakkar (transl. Know-it-all), was shot between July 2014 and June 2015. It was released on 31 July 2015 and failed at the box office.

== Plot ==
Shakthi and Chinnasamy are family enemies who fight over an election. During that time, Anjali falls in love with Shakthi, whom he later discovers is Chinnasamy's cousin. Shakthi is forced to marry Divya under some circumstances. Before starting a life together, Divya tells Shakthi that they must get to know each other, but every time Shakthi tries to do something good, it ends bad. Divya asks for divorce and Shakthi tells Divya to stay for a month with his parents so that they will not get hurt over the fact that they made Shakthi marry someone who does not like him. To make this worse, Shakthi's father gets Divya to stand for the female election, to which she agrees. When she loses the election, Shakthi's father hits him. That is when Shakthi reveals how he lost in love and life. Seeing how much he loves and respects his family and how his life has been, Divya slowly starts to like Shakthi. At the end, Divya and Shakthi happily live together while they argue over little things, making their life filled with love, and with a lesson from Chinnasamy saying that couples' fights are for fun, and no one else should get involved in them.

== Cast ==
- Ravi Mohan as Shakthi
- Trisha Krishnan as Divya
- Anjali as Anjali
- Soori as Chinnasamy
- Rajendran as Inspector Muthukaruppan
- Prabhu as Vatti, Shakthi's father
- Vivek in a dual role as:
  - Vettaiyan
  - Pasupathy
- Rekha as Meenakshi, Shakthi's mother
- Radha Ravi as Kathiresan, Divya's father
- Sonia as Thangam
- Sharmila Thapa as Pushpam
- Ashvin Raja as Shakthi's friend
- Pandi as Chinnasamy's sidekick
- Thalapathy Dinesh as Chinnasamy's sidekick
- John Vijay as ACP Duraisingam IPS, Divya's ex-groom
- Chitra Lakshmanan as Shakthi's uncle
- Yogi Babu as Chinnasamy's servant
- George Maryan as Apartment Security
- Shalu Shamu as Anjali's friend
- Cell Murugan as Pasupathy's assistant
- Naadodigal Gopal as Anjali's father
- Thavasi as Chinnasamy's father
- Hello Kandasamy as Milkman
- Rajendranath as Police Officer
- Krishnamoorthy as Shakthi's uncle
- Ambani Shankar as Shakthi's friend
- Tamil Selvi as Chinnasamy's sister
- Boys Rajan as District Secretariat
- Cheeniamma as Chinnasamy's grandmother
- Meena Sellamuthu as Divya's maid
- Shakeela as herself (cameo appearance)
- Poorna in a special appearance in the song "Hit-u Song Maama"
- Robert in a special appearance in the song "Hit-u Song Maama"

== Production ==
The film was launched in early June 2014 as a collaboration between director Suraj and Lakshmi Movie Makers, with Ravi Mohan signed on to play the lead role. Anjali was signed as one of the lead actresses in the same month, marking her comeback after a hiatus from Tamil films; Ravi had recommended her to the director for this role. Suraj later revealed that Dhanush was the original choice for Ravi's role. Ravi described it as his first full-length comedy film.

Filming began in Chennai in July 2014. A set resembling a Tenkasi market and costing ₹40 lakh (equivalent to ₹70 lakh or US$72,000 in 2026) was erected for this schedule. Trisha Krishnan joined the cast in August 2014 to play another female lead, after the team opted against signing Kajal Aggarwal, who had asked for a high remuneration. Vivek did a role in the film for which he shaved his head. Filming wrapped in June 2015.

The film was initially titled Appatakkar, after a line popularised by Santhanam in Boss Engira Bhaskaran. In July, the title was changed to Sakalakala Vallavan after M. Saravanan, the producer of the 1982 film of the same name, gave the makers permission to re-use his film's title.

== Soundtrack ==
The soundtrack was composed by Thaman S. Ravi made his singing debut with the song "Bulbu Vangittaen".

Track listing
No.	Title	Lyrics	Singer(s)	Length
1.	"Hit-u Song"	Annamalai	Silambarasan, Remya Nambessan, M. M. Manasi, M. M. Monisha	4:28
2.	"Buji Ma Buji Ma"	Na. Muthukumar	D. Imman, Thaman S, M. M. Manasi	3:27
3.	"Bulbu Vangittaen"	Na. Muthukumar	Deva, Vivek, Ravi Mohan	3:38
4.	"Un Style Power"	Madhan Karky	Sharmila, Deepak	3:22
5.	"Mandaiyum"	Madhan Karky	Sameera, Nivas	3:06
Total length:				18:01

== Release and reception ==
Sakalakala Vallavan was released on 31 July 2015. Sudhir Srinivasan of The Hindu wrote, "For a film that tries to be a comedy, Sakalakala Vallavan makes for a sombre experience [...] There are pitiable attempts at humour by the use of rhyming dialogues". S. Saraswathi of Rediff.com rated the film 1 out of 5 and said, "The absurd script, inept execution, bizarre antics of the lead and supporting actors coupled with some ordinary music make director Suraj's Sakalakala Vallavan Appatakkar a total bore". M. Suganth of The Times of India rated it 0.5 out of 5 and noted that, "Sakalakala Vallavan is so abominable — a blot in the career of everyone involved in making it — that it makes us question its very existence and how it even came to be made". Sify wrote, "Sakalakala Vallavan is a typical Suraj film, low on logic, style and execution. It follows the director's set pattern, no story just crass comedy and one-man upmanship between the hero and comedian". The film failed at the box office; the director felt Ravi was miscast as an uneducated villager due to his attractiveness.
