= Rishi (2001 film) =

2001 film by Sundar C.

- DVD cover
- Directed by: Sundar C
- Written by: A. Jawahar (dialogues)
- Screenplay by: Sundar C
- Story by: Panchu Arunachalam
- Produced by: Meena Panchu Arunachalam
- Starring: R. Sarathkumar; Meena; Sanghavi
- Cinematography: U. K. Senthil Kumar
- Edited by: P. Sai Suresh
- Music by: Yuvan Shankar Raja
- Production company: P. A. Art Productions
- Release date: 16 February 2001
- Country: India
- Language: Tamil

Rishi is a 2001 Indian Tamil-language action film written and directed by Sundar C. The film stars R. Sarathkumar in a dual role alongside Meena and Sanghavi, while Arun Pandian, Prakash Raj, Devan, and Ramesh Khanna play the supporting roles. The music was composed by Yuvan Shankar Raja, cinematography by U. K. Senthil Kumar, and editing by P. Sai Suresh. The film released on 16 February 2001. The core plot was partially reported to be inspired by the 1989 Hong Kong film The Killer.

== Plot ==
Rishi is a tough, suave, professional criminal and the right-hand man of Sathya, the underworld kingpin. On one of Rishi's missions, he sees Minister Devaraj killing Hema, a TV reporter who is about to expose him. Before dying, Hema hands a floppy to Rishi. Rishi neither bothers about the floppy nor the murder, but Devaraj wants the floppy back. Things get confusing because of Velu, who looks like Rishi and gets into trouble.

Velu is simple-minded, takes life easy, and works for a moneylender. The "seth" lends money for buying cars, and Velu, with his friend Cheenu, persuades errant customers to either repay dues or part with their cars. Only Indu, a salesgirl, seems to have some family to speak of. The narration moves smoothly forward, with Rishi and Velu leading their own lives, then their paths cross. One is mistaken for the other, and complications arise. The underworld guns for Velu.

Meanwhile, Rishi turns over a new leaf when one of his tasks results in a singer and dancer named Nandhini being blinded. He saves her life, finances her eye operation, and turns her protector, knowing fully well that she could identify him and the rest of the gang. He even parts ways with Sathya on the issue, but Sathya is unwilling to let him go. Indu, who becomes Velu's girlfriend, sees Rishi with Nandini and misunderstands Velu's duplicity.

Velu is puzzled when he is attacked by a gang that demands the floppy from him. When Indu accuses Velu of having an affair with Nandini after she sees him in the hospital, Velu visits the hospital and encounters Rishi. The duo strikes a good rapport. Soon, the puzzle pieces fall in place. Devaraj, realising that his ministerial position is shaky, kidnaps Nandini with Sathya's help and blackmails Rishi to kill the Chief Minister, but Velu goes in his place. He tries to warn the security personnel about the assassination attempt, only to find that they, too, are part of the conspiracy.

The movie ends with Velu being shot, the CM's life being saved by Rishi, and Devaraj getting arrested. After Velu survives his gunshot, he unites with Indu, and Rishi with Nandini.

== Cast ==
- R. Sarathkumar in a dual role as Rishi and Velu
- Meena as Indu
- Sanghavi as Nandini
- Arun Pandian as Sathya
- Prakash Raj as Inspector Shakthivel
- S. S. Rajendran as Chief Minister
- Devan as Minister Devaraj
- Ramesh Khanna as Cheenu, Velu's friend
- Delhi Ganesh as Indu's father
- Madhan Bob as Seth
- Pandu as Shopkeeper
- Ravikumar as Police Inspector
- Vichu Vishwanath as Sathya's henchman
- Bhuvaneswari as Hema Ravichandran
- Thalapathy Dinesh as Sathya's henchman
- Loose Mohan as Drunk lorry driver
- Mayilsamy as Left
- Kumaresan as Police officer
- Crane Manohar as Delhi
- Sakthivel as Devaraj's henchman
- Chelladurai as Seth's business partner
- Thideer Kannaiah as Astrologer
- Bonda Mani as Car washer
- Kottachi as Car washer
- Nellai Siva as Car washer
- Vengal Rao as henchman (uncredited)
- Maran (uncredited)

== Production ==
The film was initially titled Sri Ramajayam but ran into production trouble, before being relaunched and retitled as Rishi. The film was shot in Chennai, while stunt sequences was shot in Hong Kong and song sequences were shot in Switzerland. During the making of the film, there were reports that the film had a similar storyline to another Tamil film which was in production, Citizen (2001).

== Soundtrack ==
The music was composed by Yuvan Shankar Raja, who teamed up with Sundar C for the second time after Unakkaga Ellam Unakkaga. It was released via the label Saregama.

Song	Singers	Lyricist	Duration
"Vaa Vaa Poove Vaa"	Hariharan, S. Janaki	Palani Bharathi	4:56
"Nilavai Konjum"	Anuradha Sriram	Pa. Vijay	4:37
"Oh Mane Mane Maane" (Male version)	Hariharan	Panchu Arunachalam	5:36
"Oh Mane Mane Maane" (Female version)	Sujatha	Panchu Arunachalam	5:35
"Kaatrodu Puyalai"	Shankar Mahadevan	Pa. Vijay	3:57
"Jumbo Idhu Kadhal"	S. P. B. Charan, Sujatha	Palani Bharathi	4:22

== Reception ==
Malini Mannath of Chennai Online called it "An unpretentious, fairly engaging entertainer". Sify wrote, "All the characters looks superficial and even the comedy track is disappointing. Clumsily acted and superficially directed Rishi is a sleep inducing film". Indiainfo wrote, "Sundar.C tries to shift track from comedy to action and Sarath kumar tries to be a James Bond. Both of them fail miserably and should stick to what they are good at".
