= Marudhamalai (film) =

- Poster
- Directed by: Suraj
- Written by: Suraj
- Produced by: V. Ravichandran
- Starring: Arjun; Meera Chopra
- Cinematography: U. K. Senthil Kumar; Vaidy S.
- Edited by: Manoj
- Music by: D. Imman
- Production company: Aascar Film Pvt. Ltd
- Release date: 7 September 2007
- Running time: 165 minutes
- Country: India
- Language: Tamil

Marudhamalai is a 2007 Indian Tamil-language action comedy film directed by Suraj and produced by V. Ravichandran. The film stars Arjun Sarja and Meera Chopra (credited as Nila) and Vadivelu in the lead roles, while Vadivelu, Lal, Raghuvaran and Nassar play supporting roles.

Marudhamalai was released on 7 September 2007, and became a commercial success at the box office. Vadivelu won the Tamil Nadu State Film Award for Best Comedian for his work in the film.

== Plot ==
Marudhamalai (Arjun) goes to work as a constable in the town of Nachiapuram after passing his police training by getting a merit selection. Here he meets 'Encounter' Ekambaram (Vadivelu), his senior officer. He is asked to do all sorts of petty work for him, and one day, Marudhamalai loses a convict on the way to the court due to Ekambaram's soft heart. He then has to clean the floors of the inspector's house, and there he falls in love with Divya (Meera). Then, later in the market, after Ekambaram is humiliated by a beggar, Marudhamalai sees Maasilamani alias Maasi (Lal), the 'boss' of the city, killing a person who stood for a candidate in the elections. That constituency has not had an MLA for the last 16 years due to Maasi. Maasi's caste people have been a 70% majority in the Nachiyarpuram MLA constituency, but the government named the constituency as a Reserved Constituency 16 years ago. Since then, Maasi has either postponed the MLA election by murdering a candidate or made sure that his house servant from a lower caste is elected as MLA and then resigned immediately to cause a vacancy in the office. Since Maasi has his caste's support and a high income, the government has kept ignoring him.

Then the chief election commissioner Suryanarayanan IAS (Raghuvaran) comes to the town. He meets and challenges Maasi to stop him from holding by-elections in that area. Then, on election day, despite a lot of security, Maasi's men, with the help of a man who acts as a guard, come and drive away the people who came to vote and are about to kill the commissioner, when Marudhamalai's father (Nassar) slaps Maasi for creating violence. At that time, Marudhamalai comes, beats up Maasi's men, and humiliates Maasi in front of all the people by handcuffing him with his veshti. Maasi is then arrested and sentenced to 15 days' imprisonment without bail.

For his bravery, Marudhamalai is promoted to the inspector of the station. With 12 days remaining in Maasi's imprisonment, Marudhamalai seals off his illegal sources of income and arrests Maasi's henchmen for choking his empire, including a corrupt minister. To exact revenge, Maasi's brother kills Marudhamalai's father by car bomb. Later, he kills Maasi's two brothers using various unofficial methods, and Maasi vows to kill him the day he is released. Later, as Maasi is released, Marudhamalai gets an order to kill him. He fights the men single-handedly and kills Maasi, proving his bravery. Marudhamalai is further promoted to DSP.

== Cast ==
- Arjun as Inspector Marudhamalai (formerly constable), later DSP
- Meera Chopra as Divya (credited as Nila)
- Vadivelu as En-Counter Egambaram
- Lal as Maasilamani (Maasi)
- Raghuvaran as Suryanarayanan IAS, Election commissioner
- Nassar as Marudhamalai's father
- Kalairani as Marudhamalai's mother
- Kadhal Dhandapani as Puli
- Rajesh as CI and Divya's father
- M. N. Rajam as Divya's grandmother
- Santhana Bharathi as DGP
- Shanmugarajan as Shanmugarajan, Maasi brother
- Bose Venkat as Pasupathi, Maasi's brother
- Thyagu as Inspector
- Madhan Bob as Doctor
- Singamuthu as Vegetable Seller
- Bonda Mani as Beggar
- Mahanadi Shankar as Pickpocket
- Krishnamoorthy as Maatturavi
- Crane Manohar as Thief
- V. M. Subburaj as Saarapaambu
- Preeti Bhutani (credited as Sharan Preeth) as Marudhamalai's friend
- Priyanka as Bride
- Mumaith Khan as Jalaja (Special appearance)
- Rangammal

== Soundtrack ==
The soundtrack was composed by D. Imman. It marks the playback singing debut of Anitha Karthikeyan.

Track listing
No.	Title	Lyrics	Singer(s)	Length
1.	"Hey Yenmama"	Pa. Vijay	Megha, Suchitra, Karthik	04:18
2.	"Marudhamalai"	Thabu Shankar	D. Imman, Anitha Karthikeyan	04:37
3.	"Marudhamalai II"	Thabu Shankar	Madhu Balakrishnan, Anitha Karthikeyan	04:31
4.	"Oonjaliley Oru Angeley"	Thabu Shankar	Karthik, Dr. G .K. Lavanya	04:36
5.	"The Khakhee Story"	Thabu Shankar	Vasu, Naveen, Karthikeyan	03:18
6.	"Yenna Velay"	Pa. Vijay	D. Imman, Jyotsna	04:16
Total length:				25:36

== Critical reception ==
Sify wrote, "It is a mass movie laced with all essential ingredients that will work big time at the box-office." Pavithra Srinivasan of Rediff.com called the film "yet another potboiler about an upright young police constable single-handedly wiping out goondas and rowdies, armed with a bare minimum of weaponry and lethal fists." Malathi Rangarajan of The Hindu wrote, "Suraaj's scoring points include comedy and dialogue. Having said that, the film is only a cheerful version of the recent Kireedam. Like Ajit in the latter, Arjun joins the police force because his dad wants him to, and both the fathers are in the police department themselves. The similarities between Kireedam and Marudhamalai don't end here". Jaanu of Kalki wrote the director who puts comedy in the first half and lifts the film, relied on action in second half and went bad. As a result, Marudhamalai hangs in the middle. Malini Mannath of Chennai Online wrote "The film is a repeated scenario, with its fast pace being its saving grace".
