= Friends (1999 film) =

1999 Malayalam film by Siddique

- VCD cover
- Directed by: Siddique
- Written by: Siddique
- Produced by: Ousepachan Vaalakuzhy; Lal
- Starring: Jayaram; Mukesh; Sreenivasan
- Cinematography: Venu
- Edited by: T. R. Shekhar; K. R. Gourishankar
- Music by: Ilayaraja
- Production company: Harisree Combines
- Distributed by: Lal Creations
- Release date: 12 April 1999
- Running time: 165 minutes
- Country: India
- Language: Malayalam
- Budget: ₹2 crore
- Box office: ₹11 crore

Friends is a 1999 Indian Malayalam-language buddy comedy-drama film written and directed by Siddique, produced by Lal and starring Jayaram, Mukesh, and Sreenivasan with Meena, Divya Unni, Jagathy Sreekumar, V. K. Sreeraman, Janardhanan and Cochin Haneefa in supporting roles. It was the highest-grossing Malayalam film of the year, grossing around ₹11 crore at the box office against a budget of ₹ 2 crore. It was later remade in Tamil with the same name (2001) and in Telugu as Snehamante Idera (2001).

== Plot ==
Aravindan, Chandu and Joey are three friends who value friendship over everything else, even family, and for this reason, Chandu resists the advances of Aravindan's sister Uma. When the trio take up a painter's job at a mansion, Aravindan falls in love with Padmini, who lives there and Padmini's jealous cousin made him believe that his overtures are reciprocated. When the truth is revealed and Padmini rejects him outright, Chandu stands up for his friend and speaks ill of her. This makes her swear to separate the friends. Her actions and their consequences form the rest of the plot.

== Cast ==
- Jayaram as Aravindan
- Mukesh as Captain Chandu
- Sreenivasan as Chackachamparambil Joy
- Meena as Padmini "Puppy kutty", Aravindan's Wife
- Divya Unni as Uma, Aravindan's Sister and Chandu's Lover
- Jagathy Sreekumar as Chackachamparambil Lazar, Joy's Uncle
- V. K. Sreeraman as Justice Poonkulathu Shankara Menon, Aravindan and Uma's Father
- Kavitha as Savithri, Aravindan and Uma's Mother
- Janardhanan as Madhava Varma, Padmini's Uncle
- Cochin Haneefa as Manager Sundareshan, Madhava Varma's Guide
- Laxmi Rattan as Padmini's Father
- Shilpa as Abhirami, Padmini's Cousin
- T. P. Madhavan as Poonkulathu Damodhara Menon, Sankara Menon's Elder Brother and Aravindan and Uma's Uncle
- Sukumari as Damodhara Menon's Wife and Aravindan and Uma's Aunt
- Zeenath as Lalitha, Madhava Varma's Wife and Padmini's Aunt
- T. R. Omana as Madhava Varma's Mother
- Machan Varghese as Kunjappan
- Kozhikode Narayanan Nair as Thampuran
- Vallathol Unnikrishnan as Unnikrishnan, Thampuran's Brother
- Mani C. Kappan as Cherai Cyriac
- Joju George as Police Constable
- Kollam Ajith as Goonda
- Vaishnav Balachandran as Chandu, Aravindan's Son
- Baiju Ezhupunna as Goonda
- Kalabhavan Yousuf as Satheeshan, Cyriac's Helper
- Kalabhavan Santhosh as Lazar's worker
- Lal as Himself in the Song "Pularikkinnam"

== Soundtrack ==
The film's soundtrack contains six songs, all composed by Ilaiyaraaja and lyrics by Kaithapram Damodaran Namboothiri.

#	Title	Singer(s)
1	"Kadal Kattin"	K. J. Yesudas
2	"Pularikkinnam"	M. G. Sreekumar, Chandrasekhar
3	"Panjami Thinkal"	M. G. Sreekumar
4	"Thankakkinaponkal"	K. J. Yesudas, K. S. Chitra
5	"Punnaram Poove"	K. S. Chitra
6	"Sivamallippoove"	K. S. Chitra
7	"Kadal Kattin"	Sujatha Mohan

== Box office ==
The film was the highest grossing Malayalam movie of 1999 and collected ₹11 crore at the box office against a budget of ₹ 2 crore.
