= Kaththi Sandai =

2016 Indian film by Suraj

- Theatrical release poster
- Directed by: Suraj
- Written by: Suraj
- Produced by: S. Nanthagopal
- Starring: Vishal; Tamannaah Bhatia; Jagapathi Babu
- Cinematography: Richard M. Nathan
- Edited by: Selva RK
- Music by: Hiphop Tamizha
- Production company: Madras Enterprises
- Distributed by: Cameo Films
- Release date: 23 December 2016
- Running time: 146 minutes
- Country: India
- Language: Tamil

Kaththi Sandai (transl. Sword fight) is a 2016 Indian Tamil-language action comedy film written and directed by Suraj. The film is produced by S. Nanthagopal. The film stars Vishal and Tamannaah Bhatia in the lead roles. Jagapathi Babu, Vadivelu, Soori and Tarun Arora play pivotal roles. The project began production in May 2016 and ended that November. The film released on 23 December 2016.

== Plot ==
A lorry drives down the highway, knocking down a police motorcycle and destroying a police vehicle. A police officer informs the DCP, who successfully stops the truck by pointing a gun at his head. He forces the driver to open the back, which he does. The driver opens the door to reveal ₹300 crore (equivalent to ₹471 crore or US$49 million in 2026) in the lorry. The driver asks to split the money, to which Tamizhselvan hits him. The next day, Tamizhselvan reported to the media that ₹50 crore (equivalent to ₹78 crore or US$8.1 million in 2026) was recovered and handed to the government, and the driver was arrested.

Arjun Ramakrishnan comes to Chennai to woo a psychology student named Divya, whom he has a crush on. With the help of a local, incompetent don named Deva, he successfully wins her heart. Divya's elder brother is Tamizhselvan, an honest and sincere DCP in Chennai. He approves of the relationship between his sister and Arjun, and soon their wedding is fixed. One day, some goons kidnapped Tamizhselvan in retaliation for his thwarting a black money scam six months ago. Arjun rescues Tamizhselvan and takes him home, only to reveal that he is a CBI officer who discovered ₹250 crores stashed in Tamizhselvan's house as black money. During the black money raid from a lorry, they seized ₹300 crores, but Thamizhselvan publicly announced that they seized only ₹50 crores. Arjun takes away all the money but does not arrest Tamizhselvan due to his public reputation; instead, of telling him to surrender personally.

The driver gets released from jail and goes to Tamizhselvan's house. However, Tamizhselvan soon discovers from the driver that Arjun is not a CBI agent but a recent prisoner who just got out. He pursues Arjun, intending to get the money. During the chase, he opens fire on Arjun's SUV, causing Arjun to lose control and meet with an accident, losing consciousness. Arjun wakes up in a hospital, having lost his memory. Tamizhselvan keeps Arjun in custody in a house where a psychiatrist, Dr Boothri, is assigned to restore his memory so he can reveal where he hid the money. Unknown to anyone, Arjun had not lost his memory. He is only pretending as part of his mission to retrieve black money. At night, he sneaks out of the house and steals the black money of a Union Minister, converting it to white with the help of a hawala trader. However, Tamizhselvan and the Union Minister soon learned that Arjun had not lost his memory and had stolen even more black money. Arjun, confronted by Tamizhselvan and the Union Minister, reveals his motive for stealing the black money.

Past: Arjun is from Manimangalam. It is an isolated village lacking basic amenities like roads, water, high schools, and proper housing and sanitation facilities. When the building of the only primary school in the town collapsed, leading to the death of his sister-in-law, Arjun confronted the local MLA, Sivagnanam, who presented a false account of the development of the village by pocketing all the money meant for developing Manimangalam village. Sivagnanam rudely sent him away, defending his corruption and declaring that he would never improve the town. Following this, Arjun approached the Union Minister, who also turned out to be corrupt like Sivagnanam. Arjun's friends confront Sivagnanam and his men, who kill three of them and Sivagnanam. Arjun later decided to retrieve all the black money acquired by Sivagnanam (the ₹300 crores recovered earlier) and the Union Minister and use it to develop Manimangalam.

Present: Arjun takes Tamizhselvan, the Union Minister, and Divya to Manimangalam, a well-developed village. He reveals that he had used the money hoarded by the Union Minister, along with Sivagnanam's ₹300 crores, to develop the town, and he credits the Union Minister, because of which the villagers now hold the Union Minister in high regard. Tamizhselvan drops all charges against Arjun, seeing that he had stolen the money, which was black for good intentions, and arrests the Union Minister. The credits revealed that Divya, Tamizhselvan, and Arjun are all actively involved in Manimangalam's development.

== Cast ==
- Vishal as Arjun Ramakrishnan (Cheenu)
- Tamannaah Bhatia as Dhivya (Bhaanu)
- Jagapathi Babu as DCP Tamizhselvan
- Vadivelu as Dr. Boothri
- Soori as Deva / Chithra Master
- Tarun Arora as Sivagnanam's brother-in-law
- Jayaprakash as union minister
- Thennavan as MLA Sivagnanam
- Nirosha as Tamizhselvan's wife
- Soundararaja as Soundar, Arjun's friend
- Aarthi as Dr Boothri's assistant
- Thadi Balaji as Dr Boothri's assistant
- Bava Lakshmanan as Dr Boothri's assistant
- Chinni Jayanth as psychology professor
- Swaminathan as tea stall owner
- Madhan Bob as Doctor Rangabashyam
- Charandeep as Sivagnanam's brother-in-law
- Senthi Kumari as Arjun's sister
- Birla Bose as Arjun's brother-in-law
- Munnar Ramesh as police officer

== Production ==
In April 2016, it was announced that Vishal and Suraj would team up for a film titled Kaththi Sandai, which would be produced by S. Nanthagopal of Madras Enterprises. Vadivelu and Soori were selected to play comical roles. The film marks the former's comeback as a comedian into Tamil cinema as well as his second collaboration with Vishal after Thimiru (2006). In May 2016, Tamannaah Bhatia and Jagapathi Babu were cast as the lead actress and antagonist respectively. Principal photography began with a puja ceremony held on 2 May 2016. In June 2016, Tarun Arora was cast in a negative role after Suraj was impressed with the actor's performance in Kanithan (2016). Vadivelu completed his portions by the end of August 2016. Filming wrapped up in November 2016.

== Music ==
The film's soundtrack and the score are composed by Hiphop Tamizha while the lyrics for the songs were written by Na. Muthukumar and Hiphop Tamizha. Kaththi Sandai is one of the last films Muthukumar worked on before his death in August 2016. The soundtrack album was released on 26 October 2016. Siddharth K. of Sify rated the album 3/5 and labelled it "a mixed bag" while noting that "the usage of versatile choice of singers would have made a difference for the album overall."

Kaththi Sandai

Soundtrack album by Hiphop Tamizha
- Released: 2017
- Recorded: 2017
- Genre: Film soundtrack
- Length: 16:05
- Producer: Hiphop Tamizha

Hiphop Tamizha chronology
Dhruva (2016)	Kaththi Sandai (2017)	Kavan (2017)

Track listing
No.	Title	Lyrics	Singer(s)	Length
1.	"Naan Konjam Karuppu Thaan"	Hiphop Tamizha	Hiphop Tamizha	4:36
2.	"Kaththi Sandai"	Hiphop Tamizha	Hiphop Tamizha, Sniggy	2:23
3.	"Idhayam Idhayam"	Na. Muthukumar	Kharesma Ravichandran	3:19
4.	"Ellame Kaasu"	Hiphop Tamizha	Hiphop Tamizha, Mark Antony Thomas	3:03
5.	"Kaththi Sandai Theme"		Hiphop Tamizha	2:44
Total length:				16:05

== Release ==
Kaththi Sandai was initially slated for a Diwali release on 28 October 2016. In early October 2016, Vishal announced through his Twitter handle that the film was postponed to a November 2016 release and that the soundtrack album would be released on Diwali instead. The film was later released on 23 December 2016.

== Critical reception ==
Kaththi Sandai received mixed reviews from critics. Writing for The Hindu, Baradwaj Rangan criticised the script and its execution, pointing out that the director "just wants to keep distracting you with songs and fights and comedy". He concluded his review by labelling the film as a "silly, noisy waste of a good premise". Thinkal Menon of The Times of India wrote, "With a not-so-proper characterisations for the ones who played prominent roles and a done-to-death plot, the film, overall doesn't engage". Gautaman Bhaskaran of Hindustan Times called it "a corny cocktail of bullets, bloodshed and buffoonery". Manoj Kumar R of The Indian Express wrote, "Be warned: Smoking tobacco causes cancer, watching this movie may have a similar effect on your mental health".

Srivatsan of India Today, like Rangan, criticised the screenplay, adding "Do yourself a favour and keep from watching Kaththi Sandai". Malini Mannath, writing for The New Indian Express labelled it as a "long and tedious affair". S Saraswathi of Rediff.com, while calling Kaththi Sandai "a tedious action film", noted that both Vadivelu and Soori "appear to be wasted on this poorly-written script". A reviewer from Sify found the film to be "remotely original or interesting".
