= Moovendhar =

- DVD cover
- Directed by: Suraj
- Screenplay by: Suraj
- Story by: K. Selva Bharathy
- Produced by: N. Vishnuram
- Starring: R. Sarathkumar; Devayani
- Cinematography: RM. Ramanath Shetty
- Edited by: B. S. Vasu; Saleem
- Music by: Sirpy
- Production company: Ganga Gowri Production
- Release date: 12 January 1998
- Running time: 150 minutes
- Country: India
- Language: Tamil

Moovendhar (/muːveɪnðər/ transl. Three Crowned Kings) is a 1998 Indian Tamil-language masala film directed by Suraj (credited as C. G. Suraaj), in his directorial debut. The film stars R. Sarathkumar and Devayani. It was released on 12 January 1998, and failed at the box office.

== Plot ==
Manimaran, his father Poochi, and his grandfather Nagappan are short-tempered people who beat villagers for having even a simple quarrel. Only Manimaran's mother, Sivagami, can control them. Uma, Manimaran's sister, marries a man from another village. Manimaran falls in love with Vaidehi, a Brahmin girl. Manimaran takes his father and grandfather to Vaidehi's house to ask her to marry him. Vaidehi's father refuses the marriage proposal because of caste differences. Manimaran wants Vaidehi to be his wife somehow, so his father and grandfather give him an idea. Vaidehi goes to the temple to pray, and Manimaran comes there. When the prayer ends and she opens her eyes, Manimaran stands in front of her, takes a thaali, and ties it around Vaidehi's neck without her consent. Thus, Manimaran marries Vaidehi unexpectedly, and she suddenly faints in shock.

Vaidehi's father goes to the police station to complain but to no avail. Sivagami welcomes Vaidehi, who has come home to live as a daughter-in-law, and changes her mind. That same night, Manimaran and Vaidehi start their married life together on their first night. Vaidehi was not easily acquainted with her husband's house. In a fight with Manimaran, the antagonist becomes blind in one eye and decides to take revenge on Manimaran. When Manimaran drives his pregnant sister, the antagonist stops him, but Manimaran beats the antagonist and his henchmen. Uma arrives too late at the hospital and dies with her baby. Vaidehi leaves their house because of her husband's behaviour who brings Uma's death. Manimaran changes his behaviour and tries to convince Vaidehi to come back home.

== Cast ==
- R. Sarathkumar as Manimaran
- Devayani as Vaidehi
- Rajeswari as Uma
- Lakshmi as Sivagami (Poochi's wife)
- Manivannan as Velu Nayakan
- Anandaraj as Velliangiri
- M. N. Nambiar as Nagappan
- S. V. Ramadoss as Poochi
- Delhi Ganesh as Shankaraih
- Anu Mohan as Dharmidasan
- Vichu Vishwanath as Vichu
- MLA Thangaraj as Vichu's father
- Suryakanth
- Anwar Ali Khan
- Halwa Vasu as Vettu (Housekeeper)
- Chelladurai
- Pasi Narayanan as Iyer
- Vellai Subbaiah as Iyer
- T. K. S. Natarajan as Iyer
- Bonda Mani as Iyer
- Sabitha Anand as Vaidehi's sister
- Kovai Senthil as Astrologer
- Premi
- Radha Bhai
- Monica as Vaidehi's sister
- Joker Thulasi as Gurukkal
- Omakuchi Narasimhan
- Thiruppur Ramasamy as Irulappan 'Iyerkai Vaithiyer'
- G. K. as Velliangiri's uncle
- Theni Kunjarammal
- Pasi Sathya as Nurse
- Vijay Ganesh as Bus passenger
- Kavithasri (special appearance)
- Kalyan (special appearance)
- Manorama as Thangam (guest appearance)
- M. G. Ramachandran (reused footage from Enga Veettu Pillai)

== Production ==
One of the song sequences was picturised at Rajasthan.

== Soundtrack ==
The music was composed by Sirpy.

Song	Singers	Lyrics
"Chera Enna"	Mano, Sujatha	Palani Bharathi
"Kumudam Pol"	Hariharan	Thavasimani
"Naan Vaanavillaiye Paarthen"	Hariharan	Arivumathi
"Nenja Thirandhu"	Malaysia Vasudevan	Palani Bharathi
"Singakutty"	Mano	Palani Bharathi
"Sokku Sundari"	Krishnaraj, Sujatha	Palani Bharathi
"Nenjukkullae"	Malaysia Vasudevan	

== Reception ==
The film was released on Pongal festival of 1998. K. N. Vijiyan of New Straits Times wrote, "Without the comedy element, the movie would have fallen flat".
