= Suraj (director) =

Indian filmmaker

- Born: Suresh; 31 December 1967 (age 58); Chengalpattu, Tamil Nadu, India
- Occupation: Film director
- Years active: 1998 - Present

Suraj (born Suresh; 31 December 1967) is an Indian film director who works primarily in Tamil films. He is best known for directing action and masala films.

== Career ==
In 1996, Suraj began working as an assistant director to Sundar C on his comedy films Ullathai Allitha and Mettukudi. In 1997, he continued to assist Sundar C on Arunachalam starring Rajinikanth and he was the co-director of the film Janakiraman. He then made Kunguma Pottu Gounder and Military under the name Sai Suresh.

Then, Suraj returned to assist Sundar C in his films. In 2006, he made his directorial comeback through Thalai Nagaram, starring his mentor Sundar C, Jyothirmayi and Vadivelu. The following year, Suraj made his third film Marudhamalai, featured Arjun, Nila and again comedian Vadivelu. In 2009, he directed Padikathavan starring Dhanush, Tamannaah and due his busy schedule, Vadivelu has been replaced by comedian Vivek. The film was distributed by Sun Pictures. In 2011, he made Mappillai, remake of the 1989 film Mappillai. The film starring Dhanush, Hansika Motwani and Manisha Koirala. The film received mixed reviews, but the film became a hit at the box office.

After Mappillai Suraj directed Alex Pandian starring Karthi and Anushka Shetty. The film released on 11 January 2013. After Alex Pandian's failure, Suraj directed Sakalakala Vallavan starring Jayam Ravi, Anjali and Trisha. The film released on 31 July 2015. He later directed Kaththi Sandai starring Vishal.

In 2022, Suraj directed Naai Sekar Returns, to Vadivelu’s character in Thalai Nagaram (2006) in which he plays a laughably over-the-top rowdy called Naai Sekar.

== Filmography ==
Year	Film	Credited as		Notes
Year	Film	Director	Writer	Notes
1998	Moovendhar	Yes	Screenplay	Credited as C. G. Suraaj
1999	Unakkaga Ellam Unakkaga	No	Story	
2001	Kunguma Pottu Gounder	Yes	Screenplay	Credited as G. Saisuresh
2003	Military	Yes	Screenplay	Credited as G. Saisuresh
2006	Thalai Nagaram	Yes	Yes	Remake; original story writer not credited
2007	Marudhamalai	Yes	Yes	
2009	Padikathavan	Yes	Yes	
2011	Mappillai	Yes	No	
2013	Alex Pandian	Yes	Yes	
2015	Sakalakala Vallavan	Yes	Yes	
2016	Kaththi Sandai	Yes	Yes	
2022	Naai Sekar Returns	Yes	Yes	Also actor
