= Vadivelu =

Indian - Tamil actor, comedian and playback singer

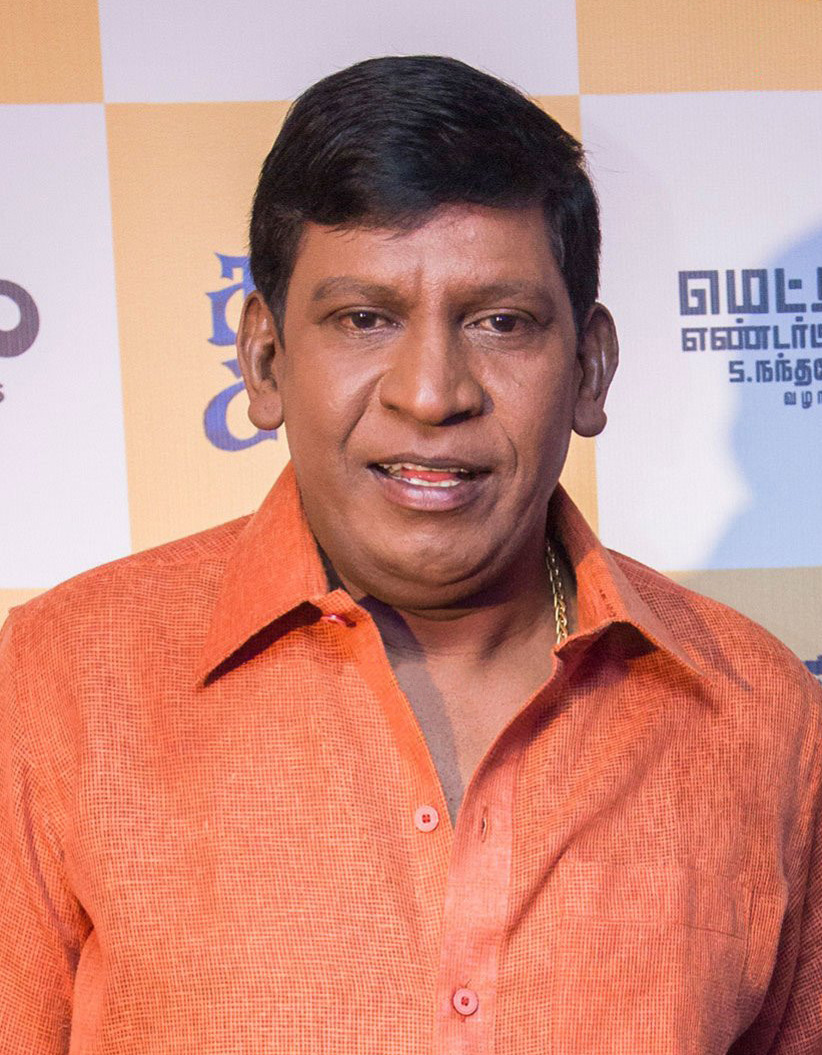
- Vadivelu in 2016
- Born: Kumaravadivel Natarajan; 12 September 1960 (age 66); Madurai, Tamil Nadu, India
- Other name: Vaigai Puyal
- Occupations: Actor; Comedian; Playback singer
- Years active: 1988–present
- Works: Full list
- Spouse: Visalakshi
- Children: 4
- Honours: Kalaimamani (2005)

Kumaravadivel Natarajan (born 12 September 1960), known professionally as Vadivelu, is an Indian actor and occasional playback singer who is notably known for his comedic roles, having acted mainly in Tamil cinema. He has at least 290 credits to his name. He has been a recipient of several awards including two Filmfare Award South and six Tamil Nadu State Film Awards.

He was launched in 1988, in T. Rajendar's En Thangai Kalyani at the career peak of the Goundamani-Senthil duo. His popularity led to his media-coined nickname, Vaigai Puyal, referring to the river that flows through his hometown Madurai.

Vadivelu has received awards in the Best Comedian category for his performances in Kizhakku Cheemayile (1993), Kaalam Maari Pochu (1996), Vetri Kodi Kattu (2000), Thavasi (2001), Chandramukhi (2005), Imsai Arasan 23rd Pulikecei (2006), Pokkiri (2007), Marudhamalai (2007) and Kathavarayan (2008).

His first film as a lead actor, Imsai Arasan 23rd Pulikesi (2006), achieved commercial and critical success. His comedic portrayals have been critiqued as using the persona of a misunderstood, mistreated Subaltern rogue, often subject to on-screen violence and ridicule in the style of slapstick comedy.

Images and videography of Vadivelu's expressions found a second life despite the corresponding dormancy in his career during the 2010s in Indian Internet subcultures. In 2017, The News Minute reported, "Vadivelu's career is not what it used to be but Tamil Nadu still turns to him for a laugh or to summarize a situation in one line." In 2019, Vadivelu was featured in the sudden viral memes related to the hashtag Pray for Nesamani which was the most trending hashtag in India during the year.

== Early and personal life ==
Prior to his career, Vadivelu worked in his father's glass cutting business and continued it with his brothers after his father died. In his free time, he participated in local stage plays, usually in comedic roles. He has two brothers, including Jagatheeshwaran who played a minor role in Kadhal Azhivathillai (2002) and died in 2023, and two sisters.

== Career ==
=== Early stage (1988–1997) ===
In 1988, he was launched through a small character in T. Rajendar's En Thangai Kalyani.

Vadivelu met Rajkiran on a train while on his way to Chennai to visit his bride-to-be. Rajkiran later recalled that he was so amused by their conversation during the train ride that he agreed to give Vadivelu a role in his upcoming film, En Rasavin Manasile (1991), directed by Kasthuri Raja. It was also the beginning of the Goundamani-Senthil-Vadivelu combination that produced a few skits in the early 90s.

Vijayakanth supported Vadivelu during his early career. He stated that he was substantial in casting him in 1992's Chinna Gounder.

In 1992, he played contrasting characters in both Kamal Haasan films. Vadivelu joined Goundamani and Charle in the comedy film Singaravelan. Then in the movie Thevar Magan, Vadivelu played a worker in patriarch Sivaji Ganesan's household.

Vadivelu's first solo came in director Shankar's Kaadhalan (1994), in which he played the friend of Prabhu Deva's student character.

He made his singing debut with the song 'Ettanaa Irundha' from the film Ellame En Rasathan (1995).

They were also considered sidekicks for an older generation of heroes, which included Kamal Haasan, Rajinikanth, Vijayakanth and young heroes in the making like such as Ajith Kumar, Vijay, Prabhu Deva which began rising in prominence, the script required fresh faces for the role of the comedian.

He won his Tamil Nadu State Film Award for Best Comedian in Kaalam Maari Pochu (1996).

The following year, Vadivelu played many films, but his work in Bharathi Kannamma (1997) was successful and its combination with actor Parthiban.

=== Superstardom in comedy (1998–2008) ===
Vadivelu is known to assist directors, with his own input being used during sets. The hallmark of his comedy was self-deprecation. Vadivelu's characters thought very highly of themselves – they were clownish versions of the gang leader. After a certain stage of success, he started to act as a solo comedian, supported by other minor comedians.

He starred in movies as Kaathala Kaathala (1998), Kannathal (1998), Viralukketha Veekkam (1999), Nesam Pudhusu (1999), Mudhalvan (1999), Thirupathi Ezhumalai Venkatesa (1999) and Paattali (1999).

As the 2000s began, Vadivelu became the undisputed "King of Comedy. He later went on to perform numerous roles, including Kandha Kadamba Kathir Vela (2000), Vetri Kodi Kattu (2000), Koodi Vazhnthal Kodi Nanmai (2000), Friends (2001), Middle Class Madhavan (2001), Manadhai Thirudivittai (2001), Thavasi (2001), Arasu (2003), Winner (2003), Giri (2004), Chandramukhi (2005), Thalai Nagaram (2006), Imsai Arasan 23rd Pulikecei (2006), Pokkiri (2007), Karuppusamy Kuththagaithaarar (2007), Aarya (2007), Marudhamalai (2007), Kathavarayan (2008) and Ellam Avan Seyal (2008).

Cashing in on his popularity, he starred in the lead role of the historical comedy in the film Imsai Arasan 23rd Pulikecei. The movie was declared a blockbuster and was widely acclaimed for its 'clean' comedy. Vadivelu played in a dual role, playing twin brothers of a heartless but comical dictator king and a revolutionary. His next venture as the lead star was in the movie Indiralogathil Na Azhagappan (2008).

=== Controversies (2008–2012) ===
On 21 September 2008, Vadivelu's residence in the Saligramam neighbourhood in Chennai was pelted with stones by a gang, leaving several windows broken and furniture damaged. The actor had taken refuge in a room in his home and was safe. Vadivelu is said to have suspected Vijayakanth because of a recent case that he had filed against the latter for assault and because the final court hearing was to take place the following day. He suspected that the attack may have been carried out to prevent Vadivelu from attending the hearing. As a result, Vadivelu filed another case against Vijayakanth for attempted murder. He later mentioned his interest in contesting against Vijayakanth in the upcoming assembly elections and in his words, "teaching him a lesson." In response, actor Vijayakanth, in a press meet on 22 September, claimed that Vadivelu's allegations were based on hearsay.

Vadivelu appeared in notables comedy roles such as Villu (2009), Kanthaswamy (2009), Peraanmai (2009), Aadhavan (2009), Kacheri Arambam (2010), Sura (2010), Thillalangadi (2010), Nagaram Marupakkam (2010) and Kaavalan (2011).

In 2010, Vadivelu held a press conference, accusing fellow comedian and actor Singamuthu for forgery and financial cheating. Vadivelu, who was previously friends with Singamuthu, purchased land from him but later came to learn that the documents were void. This resulted in the former taking legal action against the latter.

During the 2011 Tamil Nadu Legislative Assembly election, Vadivelu vehemently campaigned for the Dravida Munnetra Kazhagam (DMK) and its alliance. During his public speeches, he predominantly condemned politician and actor Vijayakanth, whose party, the Desiya Murpokku Dravida Kazhagam (DMDK), allied with the opposition party All India Anna Dravida Munnetra Kazhagam (AIADMK), headed by Jayalalithaa. His allegations of Vijayakanth included him being a "drunkard". In a campaign speech in Tiruvarur, Vadivelu stated that "(his) only aim is to sweep out Vijayakanth's whole team and to campaign vigorously for DMK's victory". Vadivelu was criticised as being biased, only supporting a DMK-led victory for personal gains and not once mentioning anything against the official opposition, the AIADMK, or its leader. In a turn of events, the election was eventually successful for the AIADMK alliance, and Vijayakanth won his constituency by a considerable margin.

He appeared again in Marupadiyum Oru Kadhal (2012), in the role of a quack.

=== Decline (2014–2017) ===
As his career as a lead actor was waning following negatively received films such as Tenaliraman (2014) and Eli (2015), Vadivelu chose to return to portraying supporting roles. He portrayed a role alongside Vishal in Suraj's Kaththi Sandai (2016), before collaborating again with P. Vasu in the horror comedy Shivalinga (2017). Vadivelu then portrayed a supporting role alongside Vijay in Mersal (2017), with critics lauding his performance. A critic from The New Indian Express noted that it was a "brilliant comeback for Vadivelu" and that "his comedy is subtle, yet sufficient".

=== Temporary ban (2018–2020) ===
After agreeing to work with Chimbu Deven on Imsai Arasan 24th Pulikesi, a sequel to their successful film, he fell out with the director over an issue regarding his costume designer and subsequently refused to cooperate. The film's producers, S. Shankar and Subaskaran Allirajah, later filed a legal case over his unexplained absence. Likewise, R. K. and Stephen, the producers of Neeyum Naanum Naduvula Peyum and another untitled film, also opted to file complaints to the Nadigar Sangam against Vadivelu's lack of cooperation. The Tamil Film Producers Council issued a ban against casting Vadivelu in future films.

In a video sent to Sun TV, Vadivelu said that a few vested interests are trying to stop his growth in the film industry.

In 2019, Vadivelu was interviewed by Behindwoods, in which he criticized Chimbu Deven and Shankar for their creative differences. Producer T. Siva and director Naveen (who worked as an assistant to Chimbu Deven in Imsai Arasan 23rd Pulikesi) spoke out against Vadivelu's comments.

In 2020, Vadivelu, who had recently joined Twitter, has not been taking up as many roles as he did earlier. Adding that he would soon take up a project, the comedian said, "You've also been asking why I'm not acting yet. Soon, I will make my entry in a grand manner".

=== Re-entry (2021–present) ===
In 2021, in a significant hint about his return to the Tamil cinema, Vadivelu said that a good thing will happen definitely.

On 28 August 2021, joining an over the phone interview with Puthiya Thalaimurai TV, Vadivelu confirmed that his ban was lifted and he has agreed for 5 films with Lyca Productions. First of which will commence shooting in September 2021, named Naai Sekhar.

Vadivelu confirmed the lifting of the ban, after 4 years, and returned to play the lead in Naai Sekar Returns; however the movie received a lukewarm response from critics.

His next release, in Mari Selvaraj's Maamannan (2023) saw him returning to the screens. Selvaraj's comments in the soundtrack launch event of the movie suggests that the movie revisits Vadivelu's previous hit performance in Thevar Magan as Esakki, a servant who loses his hand for acting on the whims of his adored landlord. This raised attention, and the revisiting of Mari Selvaraj's earlier condemning letter to Kamal Haasan, the scriptwriter-lead of the movie, for its unchecked glorification of oppressor caste lifestyles and privileges. This renewed controversy has placed Vadivelu in new light, especially given his filmography where he is heavy-handedly cast in the role of the mistreated and ridiculed Subaltern friend of the protagonist. In December 2023, he won the Best Actor Award for Maamannan at the Chennai International Film Festival.

After a gap of 15 years, director Sundar C and Vadivelu reunited for Gangers (2025). Reuniting after their previous collaboration in Maamannan, Fahadh Faasil and Vadivelu are back this time in a drama laced with suspense and emotional undertones in Maareesan (2025). After following separate creative paths for years, Prabhu Deva and Vadivelu reunite on the big screen for a new film titled Bang Bang.

== Acclaim ==
=== Acting style ===
Vadivelu's roles involve heavy use of slapstick and puns, which has led him to be typecast. His comedy sequences typically end with him getting thrashed and a closing quip from him bemoaning his situation or antagonists. His popularity has been described as stemming from audiences identifying with his rustic appearance, accent, and body language.

=== Popularity ===
Vadivelu's dialogues served as an inspiration for memes in social media. Many meme creators use Vadivelu's dialogues for all ongoing situations in the world to express irony. His lines from certain films also influenced the titles for various Tamil films.
