= Friends (2001 film) =

2001 Tamil film by Siddique

- Theatrical release poster
- Directed by: Siddique
- Screenplay by: Siddique
- Based on: Friends (Malayalam)
- Produced by: Appachan
- Starring: Vijay; Suriya; Devayani; Vijayalakshmi; Ramesh Khanna
- Cinematography: Anandakuttan
- Edited by: B. Lenin; V. T. Vijayan
- Music by: Ilaiyaraaja
- Production company: Swargachitra
- Release date: 14 January 2001
- Running time: 167 minutes
- Country: India
- Language: Tamil

Friends is a 2001 Indian Tamil-language romantic buddy drama film, directed by Siddique and produced by Appachan. It is a Tamil remake of Siddique's 1999 Malayalam film of the same name. The film stars Vijay, Suriya and Ramesh Khanna as friends, while Devayani, Vijayalakshmi, Abhinayashree, Sriman, Vadivelu, Charle, and Radha Ravi play supporting roles. The music was composed by Ilaiyaraaja, while Anandakuttan handled cinematography.

Friends was released on 14 January 2001 has received positive reviews. The film was running 175 days and became a commercial success. The film marked the second collaboration of actors Vijay and Suriya after Nerrukku Ner (1997) and was one of the most memorable performances in their careers.

== Plot ==
Aravindan, Chandru, and Krishnamoorthy have been inseparable friends since childhood, valuing friendship above all else. Chandru, an orphan who lives with Aravindan's family, rejects the affection of Aravindan's sister Amutha to preserve their bond.

While working as painters in Chennai under Krishnamoorthy's uncle, contractor Nesamani, Aravindan falls for Padmini, who initially sees him only as a friend. Padmini's cousin Abhirami, jealous and infatuated with Aravindan, tricks him with fake love letters written in Padmini's name. When Padmini gets engaged to another man, Chandru publicly defends Aravindan and humiliates her, causing the engagement to collapse. Out of spite, Padmini marries Aravindan, intending to ruin his friendship with Chandru. However, during the wedding, the truth about Abhirami's deceit is revealed, and peace is restored.

Aravindan's cousin Gautham, who desires Amutha, plots to drive the friends apart. He causes several accidents to frame Padmini, culminating in a sabotaged bullock cart race. When Aravindan races in Chandru's place and survives, tensions peak. Padmini demands Aravindan end his friendship with Chandru, prompting him to confess a long-held secret: as a child, he accidentally killed Chandru's mute younger brother. Gautham exposes this to Chandru, leading to a bitter fallout. After Gautham's crimes are discovered, Aravindan tries to reconcile with Chandru but falls off a cliff and is presumed dead.

Five years later, Chandru, now an Indian army major, learns that Aravindan is alive but in a vegetative state. Returning home, he finds Aravindan's son named after him. When Gautham attacks the family again, Chandru's cries revive Aravindan, who defeats Gautham. The film ends with the friends and their families reunited.

== Cast ==
- Vijay as Aravindan
- Suriya as Chandrasekhar "Chandru"
- Devayani as Padmini
- Vijayalakshmi as Amudha, Aravindan’s sister
- Ramesh Khanna as Krishnamoorthy
- Abhinayashree as Abhirami, Padmini’s cousin
- Vadivelu as Contractor Nesamani
- Sriman as Gautham, Aravindan’s cousin
- Charle as Gopal
- Radha Ravi as Ramanathan, Abhirami's father
- Rajeev as Raghuraman, Aravindhan & Amudha's father
- Saritha as Savithri, Aravindan & Amudha's mother
- Laxmi Rattan as Vishwanathan, Padmini's father
- Pyramid Natarajan as Varatharajan, Gautham's father
- Sathyapriya as Rajalakshmi, Gautham's mother
- S. N. Lakshmi as Maragatham, Aravindhan, Gautham & Amudha's grandmother
- Madhan Bob as Manager Sundaresan
- Radha Bhai as Parvathi, Padmini and Abhirami's grandmother
- Ashwini as Shanthi, Abhirami's mother
- A. R. S. as Dr. Chandramohan
- Shanti Williams as Visalatchi
- Santhana Bharathi as 'Singampatti' Sethupathi
- Crane Manohar as Nesamani's worker
- Kottachi as Kottachi
- Master Vaishnav Balachandran as Chandru, Aravindan's son
- Master Jayanth as Young Aravindan
- Baby Anu Krishna as Young Amudha, Aravindan's sister
- Ganesh Babu as Nesamani's worker

== Production ==
After appearing together for the first time in Nerrukku Ner (1997), Vijay and Suriya came together again in this film, a remake of the 1999 Malayalam film Friends. Meena was approached to play the female lead as she did in the original Malayalam version. Due to conflicting dates, she could not be part of it. Later Jyothika was signed along with Suvaluxmi to play the lead actresses in the film but soon backed out due to date problems and were replaced by Devayani and new girl Vijayalakshmi from Mysore. Shooting was held in a fast pace on Tamil Nadu locations (Ooty, Pollachi, Pazhani, Coimbatore, Udumalaipettai and Chennai). Suriya revealed though his previous films did not do well he agreed to do this film as one of the lead actors since his character has importance despite people warning him not to do a dual hero subject.

== Soundtrack ==
The music was composed by Ilaiyaraaja. Lyrics of the songs were penned by Palani Bharathi. Chennai Online wrote "Though the album is not very brilliant, it is full of melody and has a couple of pleasant numbers."

Track listing
No.	Title	Singer(s)	Length
1.	"Thendral Varum"	Bhavatharini, Hariharan	05:03
2.	"Kuyilikku Koo Koo"	Hariharan, S. P. Balasubrahmanyam, Shankar Mahadevan	05:06
3.	"Rukku Rukku"	Vijay Yesudas, Sowmya Raoh, Yuvan Shankar Raja	04:30
4.	"Manjal Poosum Vaanam"	Sujatha, Devan	05:08
5.	"Manjal Poosum Vaanam" (film version)	Sujatha, Srinivas
6.	"Penkaloda Potti"	Sujatha, Hariharan	05:02
7.	"Poonkatrae"	Hariharan	05:26
8.	"Vaanam Perusuthan"	Vijay Yesudas, Arunmozhi, S. P. Balasubrahmanyam	05:10
Total length:			40.55

== Release and reception ==
Friends was released on 14 January 2001, Pongal day. Malathi Rangarajan of The Hindu stated, "With friendship as the theme, Siddique presents a decent entertainer, which of course could have been crisper." Shilpa Kannan from Zee TV noted "at last, we have one thoroughly enjoyable picture this year" and "except for the end, which is a bit melodramatic, Friends is an excellent movie for debutant director Siddique." Ananda Vikatan rated the film 42 out of 100. Krishna Chidambaram of Kalki felt the director separated two halves differently calling the first half as enjoyable but felt the second half as sentimental and the both should have been equally mixed. Malini Mannath of Chennai Online wrote "It is a fairly engaging entertainer with the first part moving at a fast pace with ribtickling humour and slapstick comedy thrown in. The second half has a jerky narration, the smooth transition of the original somehow missing in the remake". Despite facing tough competition with Ajith Kumar's Dheena, Friends emerged a commercial success, running for more than 175 days in theatres and became a hit for the careers of leading actors Vijay and Suriya. The film was nominated for the Filmfare Award for Best Film – Tamil.

The film was re-released in a digitally remastered 4K version on 21 November 2025.

== See also ==
- Pray for Nesamani
