= Nachiapuram =

- Village
- Location in Tamil Nadu, India Nachiapuram (India)
- Coordinates: 10°4′50.34″N 78°40′16.31″E
- Country: India
- State: Tamil Nadu
- District: Sivaganga

Government
  - Body: Kallal Panchayat

Languages
  - Official: Tamil
- Time zone: UTC+5:30 (IST)
- PIN: 630207
- Telephone code: 04577
- Nearest city: Karaikkudi
- Lok Sabha constituency: Sivaganga
- Civic agency: Kallal Panchayat
- Website: www.nachiapuram.com

Nachiapuram is a village located in Sivagangai District in the State of Tamil Nadu in India. Nachiapuram is a panchayat with elected members, and forms part of the Kallal Union.

== History ==
The village of Nachiapuram was founded in the 1800s by Nagarthars migrating from Mekkudi, Kambanoor, Naduvikkottai, Siravayal, and other places. At that time the Amman Temple, Shivan Temple, and other facilities were built in the village.

Nachiapuram gets its name from the deity 'Nachiar Amman', worshipped as the Goddess that protects the village and its citizens.

== Emigrants ==
In colonial times, Nachiapuram Nagarathars emigrated to countries like Sri Lanka, Singapore, Burma, Vietnam, amongst a few others.

Many of its Nagarathar citizens emigrated to Singapore in the 1930s and 1940s and to many other countries in the 1990s and 2000s. Around the 1950s and 1960s, by virtue of most Nagarathars in Singapore having emigrated from Nachiapuram, Singapore was known as Chinna Nachiapuram amongst the Nagarathar residents of Singapore.

== Temples and festivals ==
Besides The Nachiar Amman Temple, Nachiapuram also has the Kattu Nachi Amman Temple, a Sivan Kovil, a common Pillayar Kovil and Thandayuthapani Kovil. The annual Thiruvizha function at the Amman Temples is a ritual that all Nachiapuram Folks look forward to year after year. The Thiruvizha is a ten-day event, with Letcharchanai, Amman Oorvalam and many other events termed as MandagapPadi.

== Schools ==
Nachiapuram has two schools - an elementary school, teaching children up to 5th standard and a high school teaching children up to the tenth standard exams, SSLC. The schools are named after Jeyamkonda Vinayagar: Jeyamkonda Vinayagar Elementary School and Jeyamkonda Vinayagar High School. Jeyamkonda Vinayagar literally translates to "Victorious Lord Ganesa". Children from nearby villages attend the schools. Jeyamkonda Vinayagar Elementary School has completed 100 years of service and Jeyamkonda Vinayagar High School has completed 50 years of service. The school is providing bus facility to villages around Nachiapuram

== Other facilities ==
Nachiapuram has a bank (Indian Bank), ATM, a police station, a post office, panchayathu office, a small health dispensary and a few shops. Water supply for the village is from two village tanks named after the nearby temples - the Amman Kovil Oorani and Sivan Koil Oorani. Water from these sources is pumped into an overhead tank and distributed to households and to public places by a system of pipes. There is a single postal delivery each day. Most homes in the village are served by landlines. With the advent of cellular phones communication is excellent. The village is on the local town bus routes and is connected to the nearest towns, Karaikudi and Thirupathur. Kathirvel Textile Mills is located in Nachiapuram.
