= Siddique (director) =

Indian film director (1955–2023)

- Born: Siddique Ismail; 25 March 1955; Kochi, Kerala, India
- Died: 8 August 2023 (aged 68); Kochi, Kerala, India
- Occupations: Film director; producer; screenwriter; actor
- Spouse: Sajitha (m. 1984)
- Children: 3

Siddique Ismail (25 March 1955 – 8 August 2023) was an Indian film director, producer, screenwriter and actor who predominantly worked in Malayalam cinema. He made his directorial debut with the Malayalam film Ramji Rao Speaking (1989). His screenwriting debut came with the Malayalam film Pappan Priyappetta Pappan (1986). His final film was Big Brother (2020).

== Career ==
Siddique began his career as an assistant director to Fazil. The duo of Siddique and Lal was spotted by Fazil when he saw them performing in the Cochin Kalabhavan troupe. Siddique later teamed up with Lal to create many films and was credited as Siddique-Lal. The duo later split up; Siddique continued with his directorial ventures, while Lal turned to acting and producing. All of Siddique's films are comedies, and his films in Tamil were mainly remakes of his Malayalam films, such as Body Guard (Malayalam) and Kaavalan (Tamil). Bodyguard was later remade in Hindi. Siddique co-produced films with Jenso Jose under their joint company S Talkies.

== Personal life ==
Siddique was born to Ismail Haji and Zainaba in Kochi in either 1954 or 1955, and attended St. Paul's College in Kalamassery. On 6 May 1984, Siddique married Sajitha, with whom he had three daughters.

== Death ==
Siddique suffered from liver cirrhosis during his final days, and was admitted on 10 July 2023 to Amrita Hospital in Kochi for liver transplant. But the transplant could not take place due to multiple health issues like pneumonia. His condition worsened when he had a cardiac arrest on 7 August 2023. He died at 9 PM the next day. His dead body was kept for public view at his home and Rajiv Gandhi Indoor Stadium, and was later buried at the burial ground of the Ernakulam Central Juma Masjid with full state honours. He is survived by his wife, three daughters and many grandchildren.

== Awards ==
Awards and nominations
Award	Wins	Nominations
Kerala State Film Awards	1	N/A
- Totals
Awards won	2
Nominations	N/A

Kerala State Film Awards

- Best Film with Popular Appeal and Aesthetic Value (1991)

Zee Cine Awards

- Zee Cine Awards for Best Debut Director (2012)

== Filmography ==
=== As director ===
Year	Film	Language	Note
1989	Ramji Rao Speaking	Malayalam	Directorial Debut
1990	In Harihar Nagar	Malayalam	
1991	Godfather	Malayalam	
1992	Vietnam Colony	Malayalam	
1994	Kabooliwala	Malayalam	
1996	Hitler	Malayalam	
1999	Friends	Malayalam	
2001	Friends	Tamil	Remake of Friends
2003	Chronic Bachelor	Malayalam	
2004	Engal Anna	Tamil	Remake of Chronic Bachelor
2008	Sadhu Miranda	Tamil	
2010	Body Guard	Malayalam	
2011	Kaavalan	Tamil	Remake of Body Guard
2011	Maaro	Telugu	
2011	Bodyguard	Hindi	Remake of Body Guard
2013	Ladies and Gentleman	Malayalam	
2015	Bhaskar the Rascal	Malayalam	
2017	Fukri	Malayalam	
2018	Bhaskar Oru Rascal	Tamil	Remake of Bhaskar the Rascal
2020	Big Brother	Malayalam	Final film

=== As writer ===
Year	Film	Script	Story	Note
1986	Pappan Priyappetta Pappan	Yes	Yes	Debut
1987	Nadodikkattu		Yes	
1992	Makkal Mahatmyam	Yes	Yes	
1995	Mannar Mathai Speaking	Yes	Yes	
1998	Ayal Kadha Ezhuthukayanu		Yes	
2005	Finger Print	Yes		
2016	King Liar	Yes	Yes	

=== As producer ===
- 2017: Fukri
- 2020: Big Brother

=== As actor ===
- Nokkethadhoorathu Kannum Nattu (1984)...Man at calling Kunjoonjamma nickname church going time
- Poovinu Puthiya Poonthennal (1986)...Man at priest's place
- Varsham 16 (1989)...Karthik's friend
- Manathe Kottaram (1995) ... himself (guest at the wedding)
- Five Star Hospital (1997) ... Himself in two songs "Ithra Madhurikkumo" and "Maranno Nee"
- Gulumaal: The Escape (2009) ... Himself
- Cinema Company (2012) ... himself
- Masterpiece (2017) ... himself
- Innale Vare (2022) ... himself
- Kenkemam (2022) ... Special appearance

=== Other crew positions ===
Year	Film	Role	Notes
1986	Ennennum Kannettante	Associate director	
1988	Kakkothikkavile Appooppan Thaadikal	Associate director	
1993	Manichithrathazhu	Second-unit director	

=== Television ===
- Indumukhi Chandramathi (Surya TV) as Himself
- Mammootty the Best Actor Award (Asianet) as Judge
- Comedy Festival (Mazhavil Manorama) as Judge
- Cinema Chirima (Mazhavil Manorama) as Host
- Comedy Festival Season 2 (Mazhavil manorama) as Judge
- Aaraanee Malayalee (Manorama News) as anchor
- Comedy Stars Season 2 (Asianet) as Judge
- Top Singer Super night as Judge
