= Vendhar Movies =

Indian film production company founded 2012

- Type: Production Company
- Founded: 2012
- Headquarters: Chennai, Tamil Nadu, India
- Key people: S. Madhan and B. Balagurunathan (Partners)
- Products: Film Production; Film Distribution
- Website: http://www.vendharmovies.com/

Vendhar Movies is an Indian film production and distribution company based in Chennai.

== History ==
In 2012 The company first started as proprietary by B.Balagurunathan and become partnership with S.Madhan in 2013 August. The company first distributed the film "Vettai" starring Madhavan and Aarya (2012 January) in Tirunelvely&Kanyakumari area (blockbuster) .Next the company distributes "Kalakalappu" starring Mirchi Siva, Vimal, Oviya and Anjali (Blockbuster). The company distributed Aravaan starring Aadhi, in 2012. Next they distributed Saguni starring Karthi, introducing Vishal. The film became a 2013 blockbuster. Following this success, Naan Sigappu Manithan was produced. Thiru directed action film, starring Vishal, also went on to become highly successful at the box office, emerging as one of the Tamil films of 2014. Their following production was Puli Paarvai starring S.Madhan will be released soon. Their next production was Poojai starring Vishal and Shruti Haasan, which released on 22 October 2014, coinciding with the Diwali festival and turned out to be another milestone in his career. Simultaneously, they distributed Ethir Neela, the dubbed Telugu version of Ethir Neechal and Vana Yudha, that of Vanayudham, in Andhra Pradesh.

Vendhar Movies distributed the Karthi starrer film, Saguni in 2012. They also started venturing into small-scale films in the same year by purchasing and distributing Kalakalappu, Onbathula Guru and Kumki. Its first production in 2014, Uyirukku Uyiraga starring Sanjeev, Sharan, Preethi Das, and Nandhana was a commercial failure. They also distributed Aarambam, Veeram, Anjaan which opened to highly positive critical reaction. The studio distributed another film starring Vikram Prabhu, Arima Nambi directed by Anand Sankar.

== Filmography ==
=== Production ===
- 2013 Thillu Mullu
- 2014 Pulipaarvai
- 2015 Paayum Puli

=== Distribution ===
- 2012 Aravaan
- 2012 Raattinam
- 2012 Saguni
- 2012 Paagan
- 2013 Vana Yuddham
- 2013 Gouravam
- 2013 Kutti Puli
- 2013 Ethir Neechal
- 2013 Thillu Mullu
- 2013 Thalaivaa
- 2013 Sutta Kadhai
- 2013 Nadodi Mannan (Malayalam)
- 2013 Aarambam
- 2013 Pandiya Naadu
- 2013 Ego
- 2014 Pani Vizhum Nilavu
- 2014 Naan Sigappu Manithan
- 2014 Uyirukku Uyiraga
- 2014 Sandiyar
- 2014 Poriyaalan
- 2014 Poojai
- 2014 Pulipaarvai
- 2017 Motta Shiva Ketta Shiva

=== Production ===
| Year | Title | Director | Cast | Notes |
|---|---|---|---|---|
| 2013 | Vanayutham | Arjun | A. M. R. Ramesh | dubbed from Attahasa |
| 2013 | Thillu Mullu | Badri | Siva, Isha Talwar | |
| 2014 | Puli Paarvai | S.Madhan | Praveenkanth | |

=== Releases ===
| Year | Title | Cast | Director | Notes |
|---|---|---|---|---|
| 2012 | Aravaan | Aadhi, Dhansika | Vasanthabalan | |
| 2012 | Raattinam | Laghubaran, Swathy | KS Thangasamy | |
| 2012 | Paagan | Srikanth, Janani Iyer | Aslam | |
| 2013 | Saguni | Karthi, Pranitha | Shankar Dayal | |
| 2013 | Vanayutham | Arjun | AMR Ramesh | |
| 2013 | Gouravam | Allu Sirish, Yami Gautam | Radha Mohan | |
| 2013 | Ethirneechal | Sivakarthikeyan, Priya Anand | Durai Senthilkumar | |
| 2013 | Thillu Mullu | Siva, Isha Talwar | Badri | |
| 2013 | Thalaivaa | Vijay, Amala Paul | A. L. Vijay | |
| 2013 | Pandiya Naadu | Vishal, Lakshmi Menon | Suseenthiran | |
| 2013 | Ego | Velu, Bala, Anaswara Kumar | Sakthivel | |
| 2013 | Pani Vizhum Nilavu | Aswin, Anu | Kaushik | |
| 2013 | Naan Sigappu Manithan | Vishal, Lakshmi Menon | Thiru | |
| 2013 | Uyirukku Uyiraga | Sanjeev, Sharran, Preethi Das, Nandhana | Manoj Kumar | |
| 2014 | Poriyaalan | Harish Kalyan, Anandhi | Manimaran | |
| 2014 | Puli Paarvai | S.Madhan | Praveenkanth | |
| 2014 | Poojai | Vishal, Shruti Haasan | Hari | |
| 2014 | Lingaa | Rajinikanth, Sonakshi Sinha, Anushka Shetty | K. S. Ravikumar | |

=== Distribution ===
| Year | Title | Cast | Notes |
|---|---|---|---|
| 2012 | Vettai | Arya, R. Madhavan, Sameera Reddy, Amala Paul | |
| 2012 | Manam Kothi Paravai | Siva Karthikeyan, Aathmiyaa | |
| 2012 | Kalakalappu | Vimal, Shiva, Anjali, Oviya | |
| 2012 | Kumki | Vikram Prabhu, Lakshmi Menon | |
| 2012 | Naduvula Konjam Pakkatha Kaanom | Vijay Sethupathi, Gayathrie Shankar | |
| 2013 | Paradesi | Adharva, Vedhika, Dhansika | |
| 2013 | Onbathula Guru | Vinay Rai, Premji Amaran, Lakshmi Rai, Aravind Akash | |
| 2013 | Kutti Puli | M. Sasikumar, Lakshmi Menon | |
| 2013 | Aarambam | Ajith, Nayanthara, Arya, Tapsee | |
| 2013 | Men in Black 3 | Will Smith, Tommy Lee Jones | Dubbed Tamil version |
| 2014 | Veeram | Ajith, Tamannaah Bhatia | |
| 2014 | Arima Nambi | Vikram Prabhu, Priya Anandh | |
| 2014 | Anjaan | Surya, Samantha | |
