= Star (2001 film) =

2001 film directed by Praveen Gandhi

- Poster
- Directed by: Praveenkanth
- Written by: Praveenkanth
- Produced by: Vijaykrishna
- Starring: Prashanth; Jyothika
- Cinematography: Priyan
- Edited by: M. N. Rajan
- Music by: Songs: A. R. Rahman; Score: Sabesh–Murali
- Production company: Sri Subajothi Movies
- Release date: 27 July 2001
- Running time: 168 minutes
- Country: India
- Language: Tamil

Star is a 2001 Indian Tamil-language action film directed by Praveenkanth and produced by Vijaykrishna. The film stars Prashanth and Jyothika while Raghuvaran, Vijayakumar, and Praveenkanth play other pivotal roles. The film features songs by A. R. Rahman reused from his own Hindi films Thakshak and 1947: Earth, while the background score was composed by Sabesh–Murali due to Rahman's unavailability.

Star was released on 27 July 2001 and became a commercial failure.

== Plot ==
Murthy earns his living taking the blame for the mistakes of other people, and so the jail is his second home. Dhanushkodi has sworn to kill ex-collector Ramanathan's son Santhosh, and so, Ramanathan has transferred Santhosh to Mauritius while telling the world he has run away. Wishing to save his son, he hires Murthy to act like him, hoping Dhanushkodi would kill him instead of his actual son. Murthy too accepts the gig since his lover Preeti is Ramanathan's niece. In the climax, Santhosh supports Dhanushkodi for killing his father, but Dhanushkodi kills Santhosh. The film ends with Murthy taking the blame for killing Santhosh and surrendering himself to the police.

== Cast ==
- Prashanth as Murthy
- Jyothika as Preeti
- Vijayakumar as Ramanathan
- Raghuvaran as Dhanushkodi
- Praveenkanth as Santhosh
- Manivannan as Preeti's father
- Nizhalgal Ravi as Sundaram
- Chinni Jayanth as Software Sagalmass
- Ramesh Khanna as Jail broker
- Srividya as Vidya
- Hema Chaudhary as Preeti's mother
- Raj Kapoor as Badri
- Anu Mohan as Sub-inspector Rathnam
- Balu Anand as the Police inspector
- Pandu as Sub-inspector
- Madhan Bob as Ramanathan's assistant
- Mayilsamy as a Police constable
- Crazy Venkatesh as Dhanushkodi's henchman
- Neelu as Advocate
- Omakuchi Narasimhan as Convict
- Sukran as Nagaraj
- Vellai Subbaiah as Sivaraj
- Naga Kannan as Convict
- Scissor Manohar as Thief
- Chelladurai as Convict
- Arulmani as Dhanushkodi's henchman
- Sahadevan as Computer centre worker
- Mahadevan as Computer centre worker
- Laxmi Rattan as Rich man
- Vijay Ganesh as Thief
- Siva Narayana Murthy as a Police officer
- Soundar as Auto rickshaw driver
- Mumtaj in a special appearance

== Production ==
The success of Jodi (1999) prompted director Praveenkanth to collaborate with Prashanth and Simran again in a project called Star, but Simran soon dropped out. Praveen moved on to relaunch the film with Ajith Kumar in the lead and producers Vijayam Cine Combines. Praveen began pre-production work and cast Nagma in a proposed item number, but was later dropped from the project after falling out with Ajith. Vijayam Cine Combines moved on to instead make Dheena (2001) with Ajith, selecting debutant AR Murugadoss, an assistant of Praveen, as the project's director.

After their successful association in Ratchagan and Jodi, Praveen Kanth wanted Rahman to provide the music yet again, but the composer was short on time, so Rahman compromised to reinvent tunes earlier composed for films like Thakshak and Earth for the project. Prashanth and Jyothika were later confirmed as the lead pair, though Praveenkanth's sudden decision to act in the film irked Prashanth and his father, who threatened to opt out of the project, before the issue was mediated.

The introduction of Jyothika's character was filmed on the streets of Chennai. The team then went on a shooting stint to Kurinji village at Gobichettipalayam and during the time there provided Rs 2 lakhs to help renovate a temple, which had been closed for twenty years.

== Soundtrack ==
Star

Soundtrack album by A. R. Rahman
- Released: 1 May 2001
- Recorded: 2000–2001; Panchathan Record Inn, Chennai
- Genres: Feature film soundtrack; world music; western classical music
- Label: Saregama
- Producer: A. R. Rahman

A. R. Rahman chronology
Lagaan (2001)	Star (2001)	Paarthale Paravasam (2001)

A. R. Rahman was approached to compose music for the film, but Rahman could not accept the movie owing to his busy schedule. The director sought permission to re-use four songs from Rahman's Hindi film, Thakshak and one song from Earth. The director followed the same approach in his previous film Jodi. Initially, songs were going to be reused from Taal, but since that film was already dubbed in Tamil, songs were not reused from that film. Playback singer Karthik made his playback debut with this soundtrack. Ezekiels of Chennai Online wrote, "Compared to the earlier hits of Rahman-Vairamuthu, 'Star' fails to keep up to the standards set by this gifted pair. Let us just hope that this 'Star' twinkles in A.R Rahman's firmament".

Due to Rahman's unavailability, the background score was composed by Sabesh–Murali.

Title	Artist(s)	Lyrics	Duration	Notes	Ref.
"Manasukkul Oru Puyal"	S. P. Balasubrahmanyam, Sadhana Sargam, Srinivas	Vairamuthu	5:11	Reused "Boondon Se Baatein" from Thakshak	
"Thom Karuvil Irundom"	Surjo Bhattacharya, Shankar Mahadevan	Vairamuthu	5:28	Reused "Dheem Ta Dare" from Thakshak	
"Rasiga Rasiga"	S. P. Balasubrahmanyam, Sujatha Mohan	Piraisoodan	6:53	Reused "Rang De" from Thakshak	
"Machha Machhiniye"	Unni Menon, Ganga Sitharasu	Vairamuthu	5:01	Reused "Rut Aa Gayi Re" from Earth	
"Adi Nenthikkitten"	Karthik, Chitra Sivaraman	Palani Bharathi	6:15		

== Release and reception ==
Star was released on 27 July 2001. Malini Mannath of The New Indian Express criticised the "shoddy" script and narration, adding that "the director’s attempt to try his hand at acting, and his taking on one of the crucial characters in the film, makes matters worse". She added, "It’s impossible to rise above a script of this type though Prashanth makes a futile attempt. Jyotika’s expressions are becoming repetitive". Visual Dasan of Kalki wrote that one must not rush to the theatre if anyone screams time killing. K. N. Vijiyan of New Straits Times reviewed the film more positively, calling Rahman's music the "highlight" and concluded, "Go for Star if you are a fan of Prasanth or Jothika".

The failure of the film ended the partnership between Rahman and Praveen Kanth, with the composer refusing to score the music for the director's next venture, Thullal. Plans were made in 2003 to remake the film in Telugu as Mahendra, but the venture never took off.
