= Charles Shafiq Karthiga =

2015 Indian film by S. Sathiyamoorthy

- Directed by: S. Sathiyamoorthy
- Produced by: C. Srinivasan
- Starring: Sharran Kumar; Jai Quehaeni; Mishal; Narayan; Vimal
- Cinematography: Sreesaravan
- Edited by: Sounder Raja
- Music by: Siddharth Mohan
- Production company: SS Film Factory
- Release date: 28 March 2015
- Country: India
- Language: Tamil

Charles Shafiq Karthiga is a 2015 Tamil thriller film directed by S. Sathiyamoorthy. The film stars Sharran Kumar and Jai Quehaeni in the lead roles while Mishal, Narayan and Vimal among others form an ensemble cast. Music for the film was composed by Siddharth Mohan and the film opened to positive reviews in March 2015.

== Cast ==
- Sharran Kumar as Charles
- Mishal as Shafiq
- Jai Quehaeni as Karthiga
- Narayan as Sanjay
- Vimal

== Production ==
Directed by debutant Sathiyamoorthy, an erstwhile assistant of Prakash Raj, Charles Shafiq Karthiga was produced by newcomer Saravanan. Having worked with Sharran Kumar during Inidhu Inidhu as an assistant director, Sathiyamoorthy signed him to play the lead role alongside Jai Quehaeni, who had previously worked on Aarohanam (2012). The film began production in early 2013 and was completed by March 2014.

Throughout production, the project's title was abbreviated and publicised as CSK, after the cricket team, Chennai Super Kings. For a particular scene, actress Jai Quehaeni sat in a drum filled with 300 liters of water and the shoot took two full days to complete.

== Release ==
The film had a low-key release but won positive reviews after its release in March 2015, with the makers choosing to use its cricket-based title to release it during the ongoing Cricket World Cup 2015. Baradwaj Rangan of The Hindu praised the film and stated it was a "well written thriller". The Hindu later listed it amongst their list of top 20 Tamil films of the year.

In contrast, Sify stated "CSK is yet another film where we get impressed with one or two interesting ideas and sequences but as a movie, the effect is certainly not appealing, may be a better writing and performances would have done the trick".
