= Jai Quehaeni =

Indian actress and dancer

- Born: Jai Quehaeni Reddy
- Occupations: Actress; dancer
- Spouse: Prabakaran Sengiah (m. 2020)

Jai Quehaeni is an Indian actress and dancer who works in Tamil language films.

== Career ==
Jai Quehaeni is a trained bharatanatyam dancer, and regularly performs in dance troupes across India.

She made her film debut with Aarohanam (2012) before starring Meiyyazhagi (2013) with Balaji Balakrishnan. In a review of the latter, a critic noted that "Jai Quehaeni, who, in the titular role, manages to hold the story together."

She later starred in Charles Shafiq Karthiga (2015) and the thriller Maiem (2015). She signed a horror thriller Iravil in 2016; however the film remains unreleased.

== Personal life ==
Jai Quehaeni married software engineer Prabakaran Sengiah in January 2020.

== Filmography ==
- All films are in Tamil.

Year	Film	Role	Notes	Ref
2012	Aarohanam	Selvi		
2013	Meiyyazhagi	Meiyyazhagi		
2015	Charles Shafiq Karthiga	Karthiga		
2015	Maiem	Divya		
