= Boopathy Pandian =

Indian film director

- Occupation: Director
- Years active: 1997–2018

Boopathy Pandian is an Indian Tamil film director.

== Career ==
Bhoopathy Pandian worked as an assistant to Sundar C. Apart from assisting him, he also wrote dialogues for his films Winner and Giri.

Dhanush signed the film, then titled Ennai Mattum Kadhal Pannu, soon after the success of Thulluvadho Ilamai and the venture was initially set to star Sherin, who appeared alongside him in that film. Since then, the title and the heroine went through a couple of changes, briefly being referred to as Kadhal Sughamanathu and then finally as Devathayai Kanden, after the popular song of Dhanush-starrer Kadhal Kondein. Sridevi Vijayakumar replaced Sherin as heroine in the film.

The film was announced in late August 2005 with Boopathy Pandian and Dhanush coming together after a previous collaboration in Devathayai Kanden (2005). Shriya Saran, who rose to fame in Tamil films after her role in Mazhai, was signed as the heroine and the film was titled as Naveena Thiruvilayadal, though the prefix was later dropped. In September 2010, actor Sivaji Ganesan's Fan Club issued legal notice to the film's producer, Vimala Geetha, to change the name of the film Thiruvilayadal within 15 days or face legal action before the necessary forum. They had felt that the title was reminiscent of the 1965 Sivaji film of the same name, and felt that the new venture would defame the old film. K. Bhagyaraj was initially pencilled in to play Dhanush's father in the film, but was later replaced by Mouli due to the delay of the film. Shriya Saran was forced to opt out of the film in October 2005 owing to her commitment to work in Rajinikanth's Sivaji. Reports suggested that either Tamannaah or Ileana may be approached to replace her, while the film's inactivity led to rumours that the film was cancelled.

However, in January 2006, Boopathy Pandian confirmed that the film would continue and the remaining portions would be swiftly completed. Shriya however returned to work on the film after she was able to allot dates.

The film opened in December 2006 to positive reviews from critics. Rediff.com noted that "Director Boopathy Pandian has a tight hold on pacing, ensuring that the interest never flags". Another critic from Indiaglitz mentioned that "Bhoopathy Pandian has a good grasp of what makes an entertainer click with the masses. His simple handling of an easy subject sees it through." The film grossed ₹100 million (US$1.0 million) in Tamil Nadu – the highest grosser for actor Dhanush at that time.

In early 2008, Boopathy Pandian first announced a project titled Naanum En Sandhyavum (Me and my Sandhya), with which he was planning to introduce his younger sibling Arjun Prabhu as an actor. He signed him for the lead male role in the film, whilst Malayalam actress Meera Nandan was approached to play the lead female character called Sandhya, for which Kajal Aggarwal, Bhama and Vedhika were also reportedly considered. Yuvan Shankar Raja was announced as the music director for film. Following the announcement, however, there were no more news or any further details disclosed in the media and the film got shelved.

In early 2010 then, reports claimed that the director had completed a film titled Naan Avalai Sandhitha Pozhudhu (When I met her), starring newcomers and featuring Yuvan Shankar Raja's music. Boopathy Pandian had restarted the projects, changing its title and replacing the lead couple by two relatively unknown artists; Balaji Balakrishnan, who starred in the popular STAR Vijay television series Kana Kaanum Kaalangal and also appeared in the N. Linguswamy-produced 2009 film Pattalam, was signed as the male protagonist, whilst Meghana Raj, daughter of actors Sunderraj and Pramila, who was also earlier signed by K. Balachander for his long-delayed production venture Krishnaleelai, was roped in to enact the role of Sandhya. The title of the film was later changed again to Kaadhal Solla Vandhen.

Following a successful collaboration with the 2007 film Malaikottai, Vishal and Boopathy Pandian signed terms to make another film together in 2010. Boopathy Pandian subsequently moved on to make a film titled Vedi with Vikram in the lead role, but the film was cancelled after an initial schedule. In November 2010, it was reported that Pandian and Vishal would make another film under the Vishal's home banner, GK Films Corporation, in a venture titled Pattathu Yaanai and that it would feature the story that Pandian had planned for Vikram in his project Vedi. In a turn of events, the director decided to opt out of the project and do the film instead with Arya and his banner, Show People. The deal took place without the knowledge of GK Corporation who had paid him and advance, with the production house's director Shriya Reddy criticising the director. But Arya opted out of the project. Boopathy Pandian after opting out of Telugu film Jagan Mohan IPS subsequently agreed again to make the film with Vishal and Michael Rayappan agreed to produce the film under Global Infotainment Ltd.

Reports suggested that Amala Paul was set to be signed on to play the lead female role in the film, but this proved to be untrue. Subsequently, Aishwarya Arjun, daughter of actor Arjun, was signed on to make her debut with the film. She would be portraying a Plus 2 student in the film, and was signed after being recommended by director Sundar C. Vadivelu was initially announced to be making a comeback with the film but was later replaced by Santhanam who would be seen in three roles, that of a grandfather, father and son. The film began filming in December 2012 with a launch event at the AVM studios, with a scene shot of Vishal praying at the Muthukumaraswamy temple in the studio premises. The team shot in locations across Karaikudi, Madurai and Trichy as a part of the initial schedule with Seetha, Jagan and Manobala added to the cast. Pattathu Yaanai was released on 26 July 2013 to average reviews.

In 2018, the filmmaker is now back with a bang, with yet another full-fledged humour movie titled Mannar Vagaiyara. While Vimal plays the lead protagonist, giving him company is Anandhi.

== Filmography ==
=== As director ===
Year	Film	Notes
2005	Devathayai Kanden	
2006	Thiruvilayadal Arambam	
2007	Malaikottai	
2010	Kaadhal Solla Vandhen	
2013	Pattathu Yaanai	
2018	Mannar Vagaiyara	

=== As a writer ===
Year	Film	Writer	Notes
1997	Pagaivan	Dialogues	
2001	Azhagana Naatkal	Dialogues	
2001	Thank You Subba Rao	Story	Telugu film
2003	Winner	Dialogues	
2004	Giri	Dialogues	
