= Jaaji Mallige =

- VCD cover
- Directed by: R. Anantharaju
- Screenplay by: R. Anantharaju
- Based on: Devathaiyai Kanden by Boopathy Pandian
- Produced by: Anaji Nagaraj; Jayanna
- Starring: Ajay Rao; Gowri Munjal
- Cinematography: M. R. Seenu
- Edited by: Suresh Muniraj
- Music by: Sadhu Kokila
- Production company: J N Combines
- Release date: 3 April 2009
- Running time: 135 minutes
- Country: India
- Language: Kannada

Jaaji Mallige (transl. Jasmine) is a 2009 Indian Kannada-language romantic drama film written and directed by R. Anantharaju. A remake of the Tamil film Devathaiyai Kanden (2005), it stars Ajay Rao and Gowri Munjal. The film was released on 3 April 2009.

== Plot ==
Ramu, a tea seller, falls in love with Uma and they plan to marry. But her parents force her to marry a rich man instead, leading to Ramu filing a case against Uma.

== Cast ==
- Ajay Rao as Ramu
- Gowri Munjal as Uma
- Naga Kiran as Dr. Prashanth
- Komal
- Nagashekhar
- Bullet Prakash
- Kuri Prathap
- M. N. Lakshmi Devi

== Production ==
Jaaji Mallige, a remake of Boopathy Pandian's Tamil film Devathaiyai Kanden (2005), was directed by R. Anantharaju who also wrote the screenplay, while Ramnarayan wrote the dialogues. The film was produced by Anaji Nagaraj and Jayanna under J N Combines. Cinematography was handled by M. R. Seenu, and editing by Suresh Muniraj.

== Soundtrack ==
The soundtrack was composed by Sadhu Kokila.

Track listing
| No. | Title | Singer(s) | Length |
|---|---|---|---|
| 1. | "Olave" | Shreya Ghoshal, Karthik | 4:35 |
| 2. | "Mogava Nee Noduveke" | Kunal Ganjawala, K. S. Chithra | 4:47 |
| 3. | "Nimmappan Kandru Bhaya" | Hemanth, Badri, Sadhu Kokila | 4:41 |
| 4. | "Manassu" | Karthik | 0:53 |
| 5. | "Ondu Devathe" | Hemanth | 2:44 |
| 6. | "Chitte Chitte" | Udit Narayan, Latha Malathi | 4:35 |
| 7. | "Cheluve Brahmana Bali" | Shreya Ghoshal, Karthik | 4:35 |
| Total length: | | | 26:50 |

== Release and reception ==
Jaaji Mallige was released on 3 April 2009. R G Vijayasarathy of Rediff.com rated the film 3 out of 5 and wrote, "Jaaji Mallige may please everyone -- those who have watched the original, and those who haven't". The Times of India was not impressed, writing, "Director R Anantharaju could have done a much better job of this excellent romantic story with lively narration and a neat script". Mid-Day wrote, "Though the director Ananthraj has done a decent [job] of the screenplay and script, the first half is actually pretty boring". Bangalore Mirror wrote, "Without being overly melodramatic, the director has managed to spin a credible tale. And this is the biggest asset of the film along with the comic scenes involving Komal". IANS wrote, "Jaaji Mallige wins because the director has just followed the original, except for including a little bit of comedy".
