= Sharran Kumar =

Indian film actor

- Occupations: Actor, director
- Years active: 2010-present

Sharran Kumar is an Indian actor who has appeared in several Tamil language films. He has acted in films including Inidhu Inidhu (2010) and Charles Shafiq Karthiga (2015).

== Career ==
Sharran Kumar made his debut with Prakash Raj's Inidhu Inidhu (2010), before going on to appear in smaller budget ventures such as Vaada Poda Nanbargal (2011) and Pathirama Pathukkunga (2012). Sharran later played the titular role of a cab driver in Isakki (2013) and appeared alongside Sanjeev in Manoj Kumar's Uyirukku Uyiraga (2014) as an engineering student.

In December 2015, he revealed that he would script and direct a short film titled Tea or Coffee with Prithvi Rajan in the lead role. The film was later released online by Aishwarya Dhanush's studio in early 2016. In 2017, Sharran debut in first Hindi short horror movie film titled A Hotel Room released on YouTube. Made under 'Jeet Maharishi' productions & directed by Rajat Sharma.

In the year 2016 Sharran started working on his script. He took two years to complete this. He was keen on exploring his cinematic skills for a full-fledged feature film direction. He associated with Cue entertainment Bangalore to direct this script into a feature film in Tamil. Bharath starred in this thriller titled as Naduvan (2021).

== Filmography ==
Actor

Year	Film	Role	Notes
2010	Inidhu Inidhu	Shankar	
2011	Vaada Poda Nanbargal		
2012	Pathirama Pathukkunga		
2013	Isakki	Isakki / Saran	
2014	Uyirukku Uyiraga	Karthik	
2015	Charles Shafiq Karthiga	Charles	
2016	Maalai Nerathu Mayakkam	Tarun	

Director

- Naduvan (2021)
