= Sandiyar (2014 film) =

2014 Indian film by Chozhadevan

- Theatrical release poster
- Directed by: Chozhadevan
- Written by: Chozhadevan
- Produced by: S. Shankar Prasad; K. S. Senthil Kumar
- Starring: Jagan; Kayal; Nayakam
- Cinematography: Rarhish Khanna; Hari Baskar K.
- Edited by: Saravana
- Music by: Yadhish Mahadev
- Production company: Uyirmei Productions
- Distributed by: Vendhar Movies
- Release date: 1 August 2014
- Country: India
- Language: Tamil

Sandiyar (transl. Ruffian) is a 2014 Indian Tamil-language drama film directed by Chozhadevan and starring newcomers Jagan, Kayal and Nayakam. The film was released on 1 August 2014.

== Plot ==
The film follows Paandithurai as he tries to win the chairman post but faces competition from Nayakam, the son of former chairman Thanjirayar, who sends him to jail. To win the post, Paandithurai tries to woo Nayagam's relative Kayal upon returning from jail.

== Cast ==
- Jagan as Paandithurai
- Kayal as Kayal
- Nayakam as Nayakam
- T. Ravi as Thanjirayar
- Venkatesan as Paandithurai's father
- Singampuli
- Aadukalam Murugadoss

== Production ==
The film gained attention for its title, which used to be the former title of Virumaandi (2004). While the earlier film had to be retitled to avoid caste-based controversies, this film did not face any controversy of the kind.

== Soundtrack ==
All lyrics are written by Snehan; all music is composed by Karthik Acharya.

Track listing
No.	Title	Singer(s)	Length
1.	"Vettaiyadu Koottam"	Manikka Vinayagam	5:13
2.	"Un Kaadhal" (female)	Priya Himesh	4:36
3.	"Adada Mulusa"	Bala	1:06
4.	"Konna"	Mukesh	4:49
5.	"Un Kaadhal" (male)	Jagadeesh	4:34
Total length:			20:18

== Reception ==
A critic from The New Indian Express wrote that "Made on a modest budget and with a fresh team, Sandiyar is one of the better rural -based political action flicks to come out in recent times". A critic from Sify rated the film three out of five and wrote that "On the whole, Sandiyar is a well written script that could have been well executed even more had the technical side been a little more perfect. Kudos to the director for opting to offer something different". A critic from iFlicks wrote that "The rivalry for the power of politics is the main theme of this story. For this [theme,] a brilliant screenplay and meaningful dialogues are given by director Chozhadevan. He has also maintained the pace through out the movie".
