= Vaanavil =

- Poster
- Directed by: Manoj Kumar
- Written by: V. Prabhakar; N. Raghu (dialogues)
- Story by: Manoj Kumar
- Produced by: Manoj Kumar
- Starring: Arjun; Abhirami; Prakash Raj
- Cinematography: Karthik Raja
- Edited by: P. Mohan Raj
- Music by: Deva
- Production company: Guru Films
- Release date: 26 October 2000
- Running time: 162 minutes
- Country: India
- Language: Tamil

Vaanavil (transl. Rainbow) is a 2000 Indian Tamil-language film produced and directed by Manoj Kumar. The film stars Arjun, Abhirami (in her Tamil debut) and Prakash Raj. It was released on 26 October 2000, and won four Tamil Nadu State Film Awards.

== Plot ==
Surya, a farmer's son from Madurai, J. Prakash the only son of a billionaire industrialist and Priya an Ooty-based tea estate heiress board a train to Delhi as strangers, in the Chennai Central Station. They get seats next to each other and introduce themselves to one another. As a coincidence, they get to know that all three of them have passed the UPSC exams with high ranks, and are going to Delhi for phase-4 of their Civil Service training and become friends.

During the course of the training, Surya loves Priya, whereas Prakash lusts after her. While Surya's father and Priya's family visit the trio in Agra, Prakash reveals to Priya's mother about his desire to marry Priya. At the same time, Surya's father asks Surya to marry Priya. During the last days of training, Priya also falls in love with Surya. During the results of Phase 4, Priya gets selected as cadre-I IAS officer, while Prakash misses the cut-off and becomes Cadre-II IPS officer, because he had spent 2 minutes of the final exam thinking about Priya. At the same time, Surya's results are held back by the UPSC board, because of an FIR in Surya's name.

Three years earlier, Surya was a village farmer. During harvest, the local tehsildar refused to pay the farmer's demand and started to forcefully take their cane crop to government stores at a cheaper price. Surya protested against this, and he hits the tehsildar as the tehsildar hit his father. Surya is arrested and placed in police custody. The villages continue their protest at the police station, prompting the District Collector Lakshmi IAS to come to the station the next day. She studies the situation, and causes the government to pass a GO in favour of the farmer's demands. While she asks the police to release Surya after knowing that he is a post-graduate, they refuse, as an FIR has been filed on him, and Surya must be presented before a magistrate. Shocked by this development, the Collector, in her right as District magistrate cancels the FIR and lets Surya go free. This power of an IAS officer led to Surya taking up the UPSC exams.

After Surya's explanation, UPSC agrees to let him go, but holds his result pending an inquiry. Surya and Priya then visit Lakshmi IAS, who is now deputy-Home secretary in Chennai, asking her help. After that they propose to one another, and start their one-month vacation. Surya refuses to go to his village, as he had promised that he will return only as an IAS officer. So he visits Priya's family in Ooty. Priya's mother and sister happily accept Surya as prospective groom for Priya. After a month, Priya leaves for her job as Assistant Collector in Chennai.

While all goes well, it is revealed that months ago, a rich newspaper owner son Arun has tries to harass Priya's sister Pavithra during her way to school and Pavi had him imprisoned for that. Arun, in an act of vengeance, blocks Pavi's public exam number in all newspapers on the result day. Due to power failure, no news of results reaches Priya on the correct time, and Priya's mother assumes that she has failed her exam due to playfulness. Hurt, Pavi commits suicide. During her funeral, news agencies come to reveal that Pavi had come as first rank in the state. Adhi and his friend also come to the funeral. Adhi's friend reveals Adhi's misdeeds to the public and Surya pushes Adhi against a tree, in a fit of rage. Adhi gets a head injury and dies. Surya is arrested on murder charges and sent to Chennai prison for remand.

At the same time, Prakash joins as an IPS officer, and begins his duty in Chennai Jail. It is revealed that Prakash is to serve for 24 hours to fulfill his father's wishes and then resign to enjoy his life as a billionaire. At the same time, Surya is brought to Prakash's jail. Prakash is initially shocked at Surya's state, but decided to use it to his advantage. He cancels his resignation plans and makes multiple attempts as Surya's life through the inmates. He also asks Surya to convince Priya to marry him. Surya agrees, and Prakash takes him out on Parole to meet Priya. There, Surya reveals that he knows that Prakash informed the UPSC about his FIR incident, and Surya will not give up Priya. This makes Prakash even angrier.

Days later, Prakash receives telegram that Surya's dad is dead, but he refuses to let Surya go for the funeral. Surya is aided by a constable Alex, and he escapes via a tunnel. It turns out that Alex is on the payroll of Prakash. Within minutes of Surya's escape, Alex is killed by Prakash, and he frames Surya for that murder. He conspires with Arun's father to publish headlines that Surya has been shot dead for the murder of Alex. Surya is received by an impostor at the end of the tunnel, and realises the folly. Surya comes back to the jail by daybreak, beats Prakash black and blue, and reseals himself in his cell. The arriving officers realised Prakash's crimes and arrest him.

The public outcry for Surya causes the high court to acquit him of the accidental murder, and thus Surya joins the State government as an IAS officer, and makes his dad proud. He also marries Priya.

== Cast ==
- Arjun as Surya IAS
- Abhirami as Priya IAS
- Prakash Raj as Prakash IPS
- Manivannan as Ramasamy
- Devan as Major Saravanan
- Lakshmi as Jayalakshmi IAS, District Collector and later Home Secretary
- Uma as Uma
- Indhu as Shivani
- Roopa Sree as Saravanan's wife
- Shanthi Williams as Priya's mother
- Santhana Bharathi
- Singamuthu
- Visu as himself (Special appearance)
- S. P. Balasubrahmanyam as Bakthavatchalam (Special appearance)

== Production ==
After Guru Paarvai, director Manoj Kumar announced that his next project is titled Vaanavil, and he would also produce this film under his production banner Guru Films, named after his previous film. Vaanavil was launched at AVM Studios. Sakshi was initially announced as the lead actress, but was later replaced by Malayalam actress Abhirami, making her Tamil debut. The film was shot at locations including Chennai, Pollachi, Vishakhapatnam, Nagercoil and Vijayawada while a few songs where shot at Switzerland.

== Soundtrack ==
The soundtrack was composed by Deva, with lyrics written by Vairamuthu.

Song	Singers	Length
"Velinattu Kaatru"	Harini, Hariharan	04:37
"Oh Penne Thamizh Penne"	S. P. Balasubrahmanyam, Swarnalatha	05:17
"Aasai Magane"	Malaysia Vasudevan	05:56
"Piraye Piraye"	S. P. Balasubrahmanyam	01:36
"Kanni Koyil"	S. P. Balasubrahmanyam	03:20
"Oh Penne Thamizh Penne" II	Unni Menon, Swarnalatha	05:17
"Holy Holy"	Sujatha, Gopal Rao	05:16

== Release and reception ==
Visual Dasan of Kalki praised the acting of Manivannan, Abhirami, Uma and Prakash Raj, and Karthik Raja's cinematography. Malathi Rangarajan of The Hindu wrote, "Vaanavil has been conceived, directed and produced by Manoj Kumar. The screenplay is also his. The last mentioned area however, is too elastic – sometimes stretching, sometimes tight and at times going totally limp". K. N. Vijiyan of New Straits Times wrote, "This movie is strictly for those who cannot do without seeing every Arjun movie". Dinakaran wrote "The director of the film Manojkumar deserves high praise for his selection of a novel 'base' as his subject matter. Though innumerable events take place in multi- different venues of action, the very interesting treatment of the story neither suffers any backwaters nor interruptions anywhere!". Malini Mannath of Chennai Online felt the "screenplay has many loose ends, discrepencies [sic] and distracting sub-plots". Saraswathy Srinivas wrote for Sify, "Manoj Kumar`s Vanavil in spite of having a talented star-cast has turned out to be insipid stuff mainly because of the discrepancies, distracting sub-plots and an over stretched climax".

Owing to the success of Arjun's Mudhalvan (1999) in Telugu, the film's dubbing rights were bought in advance of the original release and a Telugu version titled Arjunudu was released alongside the Tamil film.

== Accolades ==
Vaanavil won the Tamil Nadu State Film Awards for Second Best Film, Best Villain (Prakash Raj), Best Screenplay (Manoj Kumar) and Best Art Director (G. Krishnamurthy). At the PACE Trust Cine Awards 2000, it won the Best Film Special award.
