= Siddharth Mohan =

Indian singer (born 1984)

- Born: 20 November 1984; New Delhi, India
- Genres: Bhajan, playback singing
- Occupation(s): Singer, composer
- Instrument(s): Flute, guitar
- Labels: Saregama, The Art of Living, Dharam Seva Records, Vandekrsna, T-Series, Tips
- Spouse: Suhani Anand Mohan

Siddharth Mohan (20 November 1984) is an Indian devotional singer and composer. He devoted most of his career to singing devotional songs. As a Bhajan singer, he recorded albums such as SHUKRANA, NITHYA, SHIVANSH. He works closely with prolific music composers Bawa-Gulzar for all his tracks.

== Biography ==
=== Early life ===
Siddharth started singing at the age of 11, and his talent was nurtured by Sri Sri Ravi Shankar, he has also composed various Punjabi numbers and Tamil thriller Charles Shafiq Karthiga. He is married to Suhani Mohan and has a son.

== Selected works ==
Bhajan	Album	Year
SAANWAREY	–	2013
Shukrana Tera	Shukrana	2017
Rang Ishq Da	Shukrana	2017
Sabka Mangal	–	2018
ARDAAS KARAAN	–	2018
Mere Satguru Ji Tussi Mehar Karo	–	2018
Achyutam Keshavam	–	2018
Shiv Taandav	Shiv Taandav	2018
Tera Shukriya Hai	Tera Shukriya Hai	2019
Darbar Bada Sona Ae	-	2019
Rang Ho Toh Tera Rang Ho	-	2019
Bas Eho Ardas	-	2019
Tere Sahare Ik Tere Sahare	-	2020
Shridharam Madhavam	-	2020
Tereya Charana Ch	-	2021
Tarr Jaavan		2022
Mere Guraan Da Baikunth	-	2022
Welcome Band Guruji	-	2022
Namah Shivaya	-	2023
Shiv Kailasho Ke Vashi	-	2023
