= Vaada Poda Nanbargal =

- Directed by: Manikai
- Produced by: P. Arumaichandran
- Starring: Nanda Gopal; Sharran Kumar; Yashika
- Music by: Siddharth
- Release date: 28 January 2011
- Country: India
- Language: Tamil

Vaada Poda Nanbargal (transl. Close friends) is a 2011 Indian Tamil-language romantic comedy film directed by Manikai. P. Arumaichandran has produced this movie under the banner 8 Point Entertainments. The film stars newcomers Nanda, Sharran Kumar and Yashika in the lead roles. The lead actor Nanda happens to be one of the strong contender of a popular television series Yaar Adutha Prabhu Deva aired on Vijay TV.

== Plot ==
Two men, who meet each other online but cannot see each other, become good pals due to a series of events which makes one of them indebted to the other. But technology also creates rifts between them.

== Cast ==
- Nanda Gopal
- Sharran Kumar
- Yashika
- Srinath
- Nizhalgal Ravi
- Crane Manohar

== Soundtrack ==
Vaada Poda Nanbargal's soundtrack is composed by Siddharth.

No.	Title	Lyrics	Singer(s)	Length
1.	"Chennai Pattanathula"	Snehan	Ceylon Jegani
2.	"Nadandhaal"	Manikai	Arun Prabhakar, Siddharth, Harish Kumar
3.	"Piranthom"	Na. Muthukumar	Malgudi Subha
4.	"En Nenjil Nenjilae"	Bharath Kumar	Subesh Babu, Saranya Eashwaran
5.	"Nammai Thandi"	Yugabharathi	Prasanna, Chinmayi, Aiswathu
6.	"Vaada Vazhndidum"	Na. Muthukumar	Karthik
7.	"Piranthom Theme"
