= Gadam Kishan =

Indian actor

- Occupation: Actor
- Years active: 2000–2018; 2025–present

Gadam Kishan is an Indian actor, who has appeared in Tamil language films. He has acted in films including Deiva Thirumagal (2011) and Thirumanam Enum Nikkah (2014).

== Career ==
Gadam Kishan began his career as a musician, performing the ghatam in fusion concerts, before going on to appear in the television serial Kana Kaanum Kaalangal. Gadam Kishan then went on to portray supporting roles as the lead actor's friend in Bale Pandiya (2010), as a mentally challenged person in Deiva Thirumagal (2011) and as Jai's brother in Thirumanam Enum Nikkah (2014). Before Balu Mahendra's death in early 2014, the director had planned a project starring Kishan in the leading role as a mentally challenged youngster. Despite conducting a photoshoot, the film maker's death meant that the film did not materialise. Kishan worked as a comedian in the film Ennodu Vilayadu (2017).

== Filmography ==
Films

Year	Film	Role	Notes
2010	Bale Pandiya	Raju	
2011	Ko	Bespectacled man	Special appearance in "Aga Naga" song
2011	Deiva Thirumagal	Muttakannan	
2011	Mudhal Idam	Dinesh	
2014	Thirumanam Enum Nikkah	Padmanabha Chari	
2016	Manithan	Shakti's friend	
2017	Enbathettu		
2017	Ennodu Vilayadu		
2018	Thaanaa Serndha Koottam	Kapil's brother	
2019	Butler Balu		Uncredited role
2025	Vanangaan	Public prosecutor	

Television

- Kana Kaanum Kaalangal
- Sathya
