= Pulipaarvai =

- Promotional poster
- Directed by: Praveen Gandhi
- Written by: Praveen Gandhi
- Produced by: S. Madhan
- Starring: Sathyadev "Vendhar" Madhan
- Cinematography: Sai Maheshwaran
- Edited by: Praveen Gandhi
- Music by: Praveen Gandhi
- Production company: Vendhar Movies
- Release date: November 2014
- Country: India
- Language: Tamil

Pulipaarvai (lit. 'Tiger's sight') is a 2014 Indian Tamil-language film directed by Praveen Gandhi who also co-produced, composed and wrote all the songs and handled editing and art respectively. It is based on the real life of Balachandran Prabhakaran, the youngest son of the LTTE leader Velupillai Prabhakaran, who is widely believed to have been executed after he surrendered to the Sri Lankan Army during the final stages of the Sri Lankan Civil War. Gandhi's inspiration to make the movie came after seeing documentaries about Balachandran's execution on Channel 4 and BBC.

== Cast ==
- Sathyadev as Balachandran
- "Vendhar" Madhan as Velupillai Prabhakaran
- Nirmal as Amudhan
- Aleena as Selvi
- Manoj Aiyoor as Jayasekara
- S Madhan as Kirubakaran

== Reception ==
M. Suganth of The Times of India opined that "We are finally left with the feeling that Pravin Gandhi, in his eagerness to boast the valour of the rebels, has failed to convincingly capture the irony involved in the army winning the battle but losing the war". Malini Mannath of The New Indian Express wrote that "Praveen Gandhi scripts, directs, edits and handles the art, lyrics and the music department. If only he had made up his mind as to what exactly he wanted to convey!".

== Box office ==
The film was a box office failure.
