= Vella Raja =

Indian television series

- Genre: Drama; Thriller
- Written by: Guhan Senniappan; Lokesh Kanagaraj; Madonne Ashwin
- Directed by: Guhan Senniappan
- Starring: Bobby Simha; Parvati Nair; Gayathrie; Yuthan Balaji
- Theme music composer: Vishal Chandrasekhar
- Country of origin: India
- Original language: Tamil
- No. of seasons: 1
- No. of episodes: 10

Production
- Producer: Dream Warrior Pictures
- Production location: Chennai
- Cinematography: Madesh Manickam
- Editor: Philomin Raj
- Running time: 22 minutes (approx.)

Original release
- Network: Amazon Prime Video
- Release: 7 December 2018

Vella Raja (transl. The white king) is a 2018 Indian Tamil-language television series, produced as an Original for Amazon Prime Video. The series is directed by Guhan Senniappan of Nalaya Iyakunar and Sawaari fame, produced by S. R. Prabhu under the production banner Dream Warrior Pictures. It is the first Amazon Original in Tamil which was dubbed in both Hindi and Telugu languages. The series was released on Prime Video on 7 December 2018 and received positive reviews from the audience and critics for its making and the screenplay, It stars Bobby Simha, Parvati Nair and Gayathrie in their streaming series debut, while Kaali Venkat plays a pivotal role in the series. Media outlets speculated that the series is inspired by the 2018 Hindi-language Netflix series Sacred Games.

== Synopsis ==
Vella Raja revolves around the lives of characters who land up in trouble while staying at a lodge. How Deva saves himself without getting caught by the police and his rivals forms the rest of the story.

== Cast ==
- Bobby Simha as Drug Kingpin Deva
- Parvati Nair as Tresa
- Gayathrie Shankar as Aadhira
- Kaali Venkat as Pugazhendi
- Yuthan Balaji as Kathir
- Akash Premkumar as Mohan
- T. M. Karthik as Kamesh
- Manoharan
- Ponmudi
- Sharath Ravi as Saravanan
- Santhosh
- Lallu as Aadira's assistant
- Udayaraj as Drug Peddler
- TSR Srinivasan as Judge
- Abi - Kalki duo
- Augustin Aaju as Solomon

== Episodes ==
No.	Title	Directed by	Written by	Original release date
1	"The Sugar"	Guhan Seniappan	Lokesh Kanagaraj, Madonne Ashwin, Guhan Seniappan	7 December 2018
With the firing chaos in Bawa Lodge, the mystery starts with the introduction of Theresa who has been transferred for the 25th time to the vast drug trafficking city of Chennai. Meanwhile people stuck indifferent situations are introduced.
2	"The Host"	Guhan Seniappan	Lokesh Kanagaraj, Madonne Ashwin, Guhan Seniappan	7 December 2018
Deva gets introduced as an arrogant beast. An advocate fighting for proper judgment to shut down the corrupt industry, two struggling villagers who are trying their luck, a doctor and his loneliness and an ambitious PT teacher who plans to arrange money to build the unsteady school building by sending students to a reality show are introduced.
3	"Fortune and Failure"	Guhan Seniappan	Lokesh Kanagaraj, Madonne Ashwin, Guhan Seniappan	7 December 2018
Aadhira finds excess of sulphuric acid in Century Copper factory and fights for justice. Two villagers travel to Chennai to cash in their fortune. Theresa gathers details about Deva to attack him for ceasing the drug trade.
4	"No Vacancy"	Guhan Seniappan	Lokesh Kanagaraj, Madonne Ashwin, Guhan Seniappan	7 December 2018
Situations make people enter the dusty and blood shedding web of the ferocious drug lord Deva. Simultaneously agenda for destroying the well webbed trap of drug lord has been drawn out.
5	"The Trap"	Guhan Seniappan	Lokesh Kanagaraj, Madonne Ashwin, Guhan Seniappan	7 December 2018
Deva gets clue about snitchers inside his territory and Theresa plans the first step to trap Deva inside his own territory.
6	"The Collision"	Guhan Seniappan	Lokesh Kanagaraj, Madonne Ashwin, Guhan Seniappan	7 December 2018
Background filled with dreadful betrayal and blood shedding action runs in Deva's mind. Messed up with assumptions and threats, Deva traps all people inside 'Bawa Lodge'.
7	"The Weave"	Guhan Seniappan	Lokesh Kanagaraj, Madonne Ashwin, Guhan Seniappan	7 December 2018
Ambiguity increases inside Bava Lodge after warnings arise from Police.
8	"The Awekening"	Guhan Seniappan	Lokesh Kanagaraj, Madonne Ashwin, Guhan Seniappan	7 December 2018
Deva gets warnings to be aware of Theresa's strategy planned for his attack. The reminiscence about the revival of Deva as a crowned king of cocaine smuggling in drug dealing bustle runs simultaneously.
9	"The Quicksand"	Guhan Seniappan	Lokesh Kanagaraj, Madonne Ashwin, Guhan Seniappan	7 December 2018
Fear mixed anxiety is induced among the hostages. Theresa comes to Deva's territory and the question arises of whether Theresa will catch Deva and cease the drugs.
10	"The Calling"	Guhan Seniappan	Guhan Seniappan	7 December 2018
Theresa tries to catch Deva but unexpected things happen. A bloodbath happens in the lodge. Will the reign of 'Vella Raja' come to an end?

== Production ==
This was the first Tamil series developed by Amazon original. The official teaser of the series was released on 5 December 2018.

The soundtrack for the web film is composed by Vishal Chandrasekhar.

== Reception ==
Ashameera Aiyappan of The New Indian Express rated the series 2.5 out of 5, praising its "premise and the making". The series was also appreciated for portrayal of the women lead characters in prominent roles.
