= Maiem =

2015 Indian film by Aditya Baskaran

- Theatrical release poster
- Directed by: Aditya Baskaran
- Starring: Naveen Sanjai; Jai Quehaeni; Kumaran Thangarajan; Suhasini Kumaran; Hashim Zain; Pooja Devariya; Muruganandham
- Music by: KR
- Production companies: Harvest Entertainers; Sketchbook Productions
- Release date: 16 October 2015
- Running time: 119 minutes
- Country: India
- Language: Tamil

Maiem (transl. Center) is a 2015 Indian Tamil-language action thriller film directed by Aditya Baskaran. The film stars Naveen Sanjai, Jai Quehaeni, Kumaran Thangarajan, Suhasini Kumaran, Hashim Zain, Pooja Devariya, and Muruganandham .

== Cast ==
- Naveen Sanjai
- Jai Quehaeni as Divya
- Kumaran Thangarajan
- Suhasini Kumaran
- Hashim Zain
- Pooja Devariya
- Muruganandham
- Robo Shankar as Shankar
- Raandilya as a thief

== Production ==
Several cast and crew members were still in college while working on the film, including Aditya Baskaran, the producer and writer; Hashim Zain, an actor; Kaashif Rafiq, the music director; and Varuna Shreethar, the costume designer who was in the tenth grade.

== Critical reception ==
The Times of India gave the film a rating of one-and-a-half out of five stars and wrote, "It is terribly juvenile, with an interesting (on paper, that is) one-line plot that is stretched far enough to make even mozzarella blush, and at nearly two hours, it is a supreme test of patience". The Hindu wrote that "From the acting to the music, it’s all reminiscent of soaps aired by regional TV channels". Deccan Chronicle gave the film a rating of one out of five stars and wrote that "The plot is interesting, but its amateurish treatment by newbie Aditya Bhaskar is a major downer". A critic from Maalai Malar praised the cinematography and songs. The film was also reviewed by Samayam and The New Indian Express.
