= Irfan (actor) =

Indian actor

- Born: 29 November 1985 (age 40); Madurai, Tamil Nadu
- Occupations: Actor, Model, Dancer, Director, Writer
- Years active: 2006–present

Irfan is an Indian actor who has appeared in Tamil films and television serials. He began his career with the television serial Kana Kaanum Kaalangal.

== Life and career ==
Irfan Mohamed was born in Madurai on 29 November 1985. His breakthrough role in Kanaa Kaanum Kaalangal where he played Vineeth. Subsequently, he participated in the dance reality show Jodi Number One in STAR Vijay TV. His other co-stars from Kanaa Kaanum Kaalangal came together with him to make a film, Pattalam. In 2012 he played in Eppadi Manasukkul Vanthai.

He played the lead role in Sundaattam and Shakti Saravanan in the Vijay TV serial Saravanan Meenatchi.

Irfan decided to pursue writing and direction. He signed to direct a film starring Nithin Sathya, however the project did not take off.

He played a villain role for the first time in Rajavukku Check, co-starring Cheran.

After a 4-year hiatus, he made a comeback through the fourth reboot edition of Kana Kaanum Kaalangal as Jerry. He also was part of Mahanadigai on Zee Tamil, as a mentor.

== Filmography ==
=== Films ===
Key
†	Denotes films that have not yet been released

Year	Film	Role	Notes
2006	Mercury Pookal	Nisha's lover	Uncredited Role
2009	Pattalam	Karthik	Debut
2012	Eppadi Manasukkul Vanthai	Sam	
2013	Sundaattam	Prabhakaran	
2014	Ethir Veechu (Goal)		Malaysian film
2015	Pongi Ezhu Manohara	Manohar	
2015	Ru		Unreleased film
2016	Aagam	Sai	
2020	Rajavukku Check	Akshay	

=== Television ===
Serials

Year	Serial	Role	Channel & Platform	Notes
2006–2008	Kana Kaanum Kaalangal	Vineeth	Vijay TV	
2013-2014	Saravannan Meenatchi	Shakthi Saravanan	Vijay TV	
2022	Kana Kaanum Kaalangal	Jerry	Disney+Hotstar web series	
2026–Present	Vaagai Sooda Vaa	Jeeva	Zee Tamil	

Shows

Year	Serial	Role	Language	Channel	Notes
2008–2009	Jodi Number One (season 2)	Contestant	Tamil	Vijay TV	3rd place (2nd runner up)
2021	Kana Kaanum Kaalangal Reunion	Himself	Tamil	Vijay TV	
2024–2025	Mahanadigai	Mentor	Tamil	Zee Tamil	2nd place (1st runner up)

=== Digital ===
Year	Title	Role	Language	Platform	Channel	Medium	Notes
2016	Neengal Thodarbu Kollum Vadikaiyalar	Jeeva	Tamil	YouTube	Indiaglitz	Short Film	Also Director & Writer
2017	Rani	N/A	Tamil	YouTube	FilmTimes	Short Film	Director & Writer
2022	Unmai Sonnal Nesippayaa	Ram	Tamil	YouTube	Kutty Story	Short Film	
2022	Karthik & Kika	Karthik	Tamil	YouTube	Vels Signature	Short Film	Also Producer
2022	Idhu Enna Maayam	Ram	Tamil	YouTube	Kutty Story	Web Series	
2023	Hey Crazy Penne	Kathir	Tamil	YouTube	King Pictures	Short Film	
