= Guru Paarvai =

- Poster
- Directed by: Manoj Kumar
- Screenplay by: P. Kalaimani
- Story by: GopuBabu
- Produced by: Manoj Kumar; N. J. Mothy
- Starring: Prakash Raj; Khushbu; Anju Aravind
- Cinematography: C. Dhanapal
- Edited by: P. Mohanraj
- Music by: Deva
- Production company: Guru Films
- Release date: 14 November 1998
- Running time: 150 minutes
- Country: India
- Language: Tamil

Guru Paarvai (transl. Guru's vision) is a 1998 Indian Tamil-language thriller film written and directed by Manoj Kumar. The film stars Prakash Raj, Khushbu and Anju Aravind, while Thalaivasal Vijay, Manivannan, Easwari Rao and Ramesh Khanna play the supporting roles. It was released on 14 November 1998. The film was remade in Telugu as Veedu Samanyudu Kaadu (1999) with Prakash Raj reprising his role, and in Hindi as Bhairav (2001).

== Plot ==
The film begins with Guru Moorthi who follows Pooja. Guru Moorthi claims to be Mahendra Boopathi in his past life and he was in love with Alamelu. According to him, Pooja looks like his lover Alamelu and Guru Moorthi finally seduces her. They decide to get married but the day before their wedding, he foists prostitution charges on her and she is arrested. Guru Moorthi, in fact, is a mechanic living in both Visakhapatnam and Chennai. Shanti, a petty thief, steals money to bring up her two nephews. She befriends Guru Moorthi and he accommodates her in his house. They both fall in love and Shanti is renamed Sonali by Guru Moorthi. They get married at the register office and Shanti signs under the name Sonali. One day, Guru Moorthi cancels the wedding of a woman named Sonali and he claims to be her husband, to prove it, he shows his marriage certificate. His wife Shanti doesn't understand why he behaves like a sadist and she was ready to leave him. Guru Moorthi ultimately tells her about his bitter past.

In the past, Mahendra Boopathi, despite being a young gold-medalist graduate, was unable to find a work. He lived with his mother, his sister Kalyani and his maternal uncle Nagarajan. His neighbour Priya fell in love with him and she decided to live in his house without getting married. Boopathi had a chance to get a job in a bank if he passed an exam. On the day of the exam, he inadvertently lost his hall-ticket. In the meantime, Pooja, Sonali and Indhu were attacked by the rowdy Kaali and they killed his younger brother accidentally. The police pressured them to tell the truth, they then found Boopathi's hall-ticket at the crime scene and they blamed him for killing Kaali's younger brother. Guru Moorthi was immediately arrested. Later, Kaali's elder brother Vijay killed Guru Moorthi's entire family and his lover Priya. Guru Moorthi was sent in jail for seven years and Kaali fled to Ooty. Kaali changed his appearance, his name and he became a successful businessman. Hence, only Guru Moorthi and his uncle Nagarajan were the people to survive the attack on his family.

Back to the present, Shanti feels sorry for her innocent husband and decides to help him in seeking his revenge and calming himself. Guru Moorthi thus now searches for Kaali and Indhu. Kaali is now married to Indhu and they have a girl. In the end, Guru Moorthi tricks Indhu into shooting Kaali to death for which she gets arrested and Guru ends up adopting Indhu's daughter as his own.

== Cast ==
- Prakash Raj as Guru Moorthi alias Mahendra Boopathi
- Khushbu as Shanthi, Mahendra's wife
- Anju Aravind as Priya, Guru Moorthi's deceased lover
- Easwari Rao as Pooja
- Madhu Sharma as Sonali
- Indhu as Indhu
- Thalaivasal Vijay as Kaali alias Vijay, the main antagonist
- Manivannan as Nagarajan, Guru Moorthi's maternal uncle
- Santhana Bharathi as Priya's father
- Mohan V. Ram as Pooja's father
- Baby Akshaya as Akshaya
- Ramesh Khanna as Lingam
- Alex as Joseph
- Pandu as Vignesh
- Singamuthu as a tea vendor
- T. P. Gajendran as a comic inspector
- Sriman in a guest appearance
- S. Ve. Shekher as Police Inspector (guest appearance)

== Production ==
The film was initially supposed to be produced by Bharathiraja who later opted out due to the 1997 FEFSI strike; due to this many actors created confusions in call sheets which was later sorted.

== Soundtrack ==
The music was composed by Deva.

Song	Singer(s)	Lyrics	Duration
"Nandavana Poove"	Anuradha Sriram, P. Unnikrishnan	Vaasan	4:56
"Podu Jeans"	Swarnalatha, Krishnaraj	Vaali	5:08
"Ek Ladka"	Mano, K. S. Chithra	Vaali	5:00
"Parvai Parvai"	Krishnaraj, Swarnalatha	Arivumathi	5:03
"Ding Dong"	Swarnalatha	Arivumathi	5:08
"Vekkali Amman"	Sujatha, Swarnalatha	R. V. Udayakumar	2:04

== Reception ==
Kala Krishnan Ramesh of Deccan Herald wrote, "All in all, a bad film that drags and leaves you with a heavy feeling." Kalki wrote this is a film based solely on a superb performance by Prakash Raj. There is some strength in the story as well. The director has won by persistently trying to ruin what should have been a good thriller. D. S. Ramanujam of The Hindu wrote, "The vengeful acts of the hero are focussed on a different dimension and the cause for that attitude keeps the viewers guessing [...] The semi-villain role fits Prakashraj like a glove and he revels in it" He also appreciated the cinematography. K. N. Vijiyan of New Straits Times wrote, "Watch this if you love Prakash Raj or want a crime thriller. If you can be patient for the first hour, the rest of the movie will be easy to sit through".

== Legacy ==
Two years after release, the producers were given a ₹5 lakh (equivalent to ₹21 lakh or US$24,000 in 2023) subsidy by the Tamil Nadu government along with several other films. Manoj Kumar later established a production company Guru Films, named after this film, and the first film produced under this banner was Vaanavil (2000), also featuring Prakash Raj.
