= Kaadhal Solla Vandhen =

- Theatrical release poster
- Directed by: Boopathy Pandian
- Written by: Boopathy Pandian
- Produced by: S. Jayakumar; Meena Jayakumar
- Starring: Balaji Balakrishnan; Meghana Raj
- Cinematography: Rana
- Edited by: Praveen K. L.; N. B. Srikanth
- Music by: Yuvan Shankar Raja
- Production company: S3 Films
- Release date: 13 August 2010
- Country: India
- Language: Tamil

Kaadhal Solla Vandhen (transl. I came to express my love) is a 2010 Indian Tamil-language romantic drama film written and directed by Boopathy Pandian, starring Balaji Balakrishnan and Meghana Raj. The film was produced by S3 Films and features music scored by Yuvan Shankar Raja. It was released on 13 August 2010.

== Plot ==
In Trichy, 'Nanu' Prabhu, a carefree teenager, joins college and falls deeply in love with his senior Sandhya at first sight. Undeterred by their age difference, Prabhu pursues Sandhya with unwavering determination, aided by his best friend Petha Perumal, a glutton. Sandhya views Prabhu as just a friend, but as they commute to college together, their friendship blossoms. However, complications arise when Aravind, one of Sandhya's batchmates and a one-sided lover, disapproves of Sandhya's association with Prabhu.

Under the guise of helping Aravind, Prabhu cultivates a closer relationship with Sandhya. Aravind and his friends soon realize Prabhu's intentions, and tensions escalate. Aravind attempts to win Sandhya's heart, but Prabhu foils his plans. As Prabhu's absence makes Sandhya's heart grow fonder, she draws closer to him and his family. One day, Sandhya receives a call from her father, requesting her to meet a prospective groom in Chennai. This news devastates Prabhu, who considers proposing to Sandhya when handing her the ticket but ultimately hesitates.

Upon Sandhya's return from Chennai, she reveals she did not connect with the groom, delighting Prabhu. Emboldened, Prabhu confesses his love to Sandhya during a heated argument with a senior. However, Sandhya reports the incident to the college principal and, feeling uneasy, departs for her hometown, Karaikudi. Undeterred, Prabhu follows Sandhya to Karaikudi, apologizes, and persuades her to return to Trichy. Upon their return, Prabhu reaffirms his enduring love for Sandhya.

Sandhya attempts to test Prabhu's feelings, hoping to prove that his emotions are mere infatuation. However, her efforts yield no results, leaving her increasingly entwined in Prabhu's affection. Prabhu's parents, seeing their son's all-consuming love for Sandhya, withdraw him from college and have him assist his father at work. Sandhya meets Prabhu to announce the completion of her exams and her impending departure home, urging him to move on and reconsider college the following year. However, Prabhu remains silent, secretly planning an emotional proposal by staging an accident with the help of a friendly bus driver.

Unbeknownst to Prabhu, Sandhya has developed feelings for him and intends to propose. The next day, Prabhu hands a suicide letter to Sandhya's friend, who delivers it to Sandhya in the exam hall. Fate intervenes when the assigned bus driver takes leave due to his wife's delivery and another driver takes charge. As Sandhya rushes to prevent Prabhu's supposed suicide, the driver attempts to contact him but fails. In a tragic twist, the bus avoids Prabhu, but a speeding van strikes and kills him instantly. Prabhu's parents arrive just in time to witness their son's lifeless body. Overcome with grief, Sandhya cradles Prabhu in her lap, surrounded by the gathering crowd, and weeps uncontrollably.

Five years later, Sandhya returns to their alma mater as a lecturer, still unmarried and cherishing memories of Prabhu.

== Cast ==
- Balaji Balakrishnan as 'Nanu' Prabhu
  - Master Surya as Young Prabhu
- Meghana Raj as Sandhya
- Karthik Sabesh as Petha Perumal
- R. Sundarrajan as Prabhu's father
- Ashwin as Aravind Singh
- Thambi Ramaiah as Professor
- Sevvalai Rasu as Prabhu's neighbor
- Boys Rajan as College Principal
- Usha Elizabeth Suraj as Prabhu's mother
- Heera
- Pollachi Selvam
- Thangadurai as Aravind's sidekick (uncredited)
- Ravi as Bus Driver
- Thanjai Ragupathy
- Tajkhan
- Arya as Doctor (Guest appearance)

== Production ==
Balaji Balakrishnan and Meghana Raj, daughter of actors Sundar Raj and Pramila Joshai, made their debut in leading roles. The film's shooting was primarily carried on in and around Perambalur, with major portions being filmed at the Dhanalakshmi Srinivasan Engineering College.

== Soundtrack ==
Kaadhal Solla Vandhen

Soundtrack album by Yuvan Shankar Raja
- Released: 16 June 2010
- Recorded: 2010
- Genre: Feature film soundtrack
- Length: 23:02
- Label: Think Music
- Producer: Yuvan Shankar Raja

Yuvan Shankar Raja chronology
Baana Kaathadi (2010)	Kaadhal Solla Vandhen (2010)	Thillalangadi (2010)

The film score and soundtrack are composed by Yuvan Shankar Raja. The soundtrack album, which was released on 16 June 2010 at Sathyam Cinemas, Chennai, consists of 5 songs, all of which being solo numbers and notably featuring only male voices, with the fourth song "Saamy Varugudhu" being sung by real Hindu priests (poosaris). The film did feature another song as part of the film score that was not included in the soundtrack.

All lyrics are written by Na. Muthukumar, except where noted.

Track listing
No.	Title	Lyrics	Singer(s)	Length
1.	"Oh Shala" (Saradhi)	Saradhi	Yuvan Shankar Raja	4:16
2.	"Oru Vaanavillin Pakkathilae"	Na. Muthukumar	Udit Narayan	4:48
3.	"Enna Enna Aagiraen"	Na. Muthukumar	Vijay Yesudas	4:38
4.	"Saamy Varugudhu"	Na. Muthukumar	Chidambaram Sivakumar Poosari & Chorus	3:38
5.	"Anbulla Sandhya"	Na. Muthukumar	Karthik	5:42
Total length:				23:02

Not in the soundtrack
Other music featured in the film includes:

1. Yedho Ondru Unnai, sung by Haricharan, composed by Yuvan Shankar Raja

== Reception ==
Rediff.com rated the film 2/5 and wrote, "Now, if only the director had shown some logic and rationale in the story instead of re-working several other earlier films, this movie might have lived up to the promise it generates in the first half". The New Indian Express wrote "humour in the lines, fun-filled moments, and a racy pace which keeps the audience engaged for most part".
