= Vaagai Sooda Vaa (TV series) =

- Genre: Drama; Romance
- Written by: Dialogues: Albin Prashanth Raj
- Screenplay by: Guru Sampanthkumar
- Story by: Santhakumari
- Directed by: Prathap Mani
- Starring: Kuyili, Irfan; Pavithra Aravind
- Music by: Karaneeshwaran
- Country of origin: India
- Original language: Tamil
- No. of episodes: 260

Production
- Executive producer: Puviyarasan Perumal
- Producers: Devan Charles; P. Praveen Kumar; Saranya Veeramani
- Cinematography: David Baskar
- Editor: Guru Nandhan
- Camera setup: Multi-camera
- Running time: 22–24 minutes
- Production company: Parable Pictures

Original release
- Network: Zee Tamil
- Release: 26 January 2026 – present

Vaagai Sooda Vaa (transl. Come, wear the crown of victory) is a 2026 Indian Tamil-language family Melodrama television series starring Irfan and Pavithra Aravind in lead roles. The series explores the complex relationship between a grandmother and her grandson and middle-class girl Meenakshi, set against the backdrop of family dynamics and traditions.

It is produced by Devan Charles, P. Praveen Kumar and Saranya Veeramani under the banner of Parable Pictures and directed by Prathap Mani. It premiered on Zee Tamil on 26 January 2026, and airs on Monday to Saturday at 21:30 and streams digitally on ZEE5.

== Plot ==
The series is set in Madurai. The story is about a middle-class family headed by a single mother, Sumathi (Gayathri Shastri) After her husband abandons her, she raises her daughters, Thenmozhi and Meenakshi, with values. Thenmozhi, a tailor, is the eldest daughter is soft spoken. Meenakshi, the youngest, is brave and aspires to achieve her dream of becoming a lawyer.

Annapurani (Kuyili), is the money-minded matriarch who rules her family. Her youngest grandson Jeevanantham opposes his grandmother. Thenmozhi marries into Mano's debt-ridden family. But, to protect Thenmozhi and restore the family's dignity, Meenakshi weds Jeeva, Mano’s younger brother. Meenakshi faces challenges in the form of Annapurani. But her husband Jeevanatham supports and helps her to achieve and fulfill the dreams.

== Cast ==
=== Main ===
- Pavithra Aravind as Meenakshi Jeevanantham
- Irfan as Jeevanantham, Meenakshi’s husband. Logu and Sakthi’s son. Mano’s brother

=== Recurring ===
- Kuyili as Annapoorani, Jeeva’s step-grandmother. Logu’s stepmother. Main antagonist.
- Parveen as Thenmozhi Manoharan, Sumathi and Vasudevan’s eldest daughter. Meenakshi’s elder sister, Mano’s wife.
- R. Karuna Vilasini as Devi
- Sakthivel Adhi Meena as Manoharan, Jeeva’s elder brother. Thenmozhi’s husband.
- Gayatri Shastri as Sumathi, Vasudevan’s wife.
- Janaki Suresh as Sakthishwari, Logu’s wife. Jeeva and Mano’s mother.
- Arul Rajan as Loganathan
- Ajay Rathnam as Vasudevan
- Navin Kishore as Adhitya
- Vinod KG as Pandian
- VJ Nisha as Ramya
- Preethi / Pranika Dhakshu as Kayal

=== Special appearance ===
- Vichithra as S. Kalaiyarasi
- Kausalya as Sakunthala Devi

== Production ==
=== Development ===
Vaagai Sooda Vaa was produced by Devan Charles, P. Praveen Kumar and Saranya Veeramani under the banner of Parable Pictures. The series is directed by Prathap Mani, known for his series like Deivam Thantha Poove (2021–2023), Thavamai Thavamirundhu (2022–2023), Sandhya Raagam (TV series) (2024) Valliyin Velan (2024–2025) and written by Alvin Prashanth Raj.

=== Casting ===
Actor Irfan was cast as the male lead Jeevanantham, making his comeback to acting in Television serials after JioHotstar’s Kana Kaanum Kaalangal. Actress Pavithra Gowda plays the lead role as Meenakshi in the series, making her comeback to acting in Television serials after Star Vijay’s Kanne Kalaimaane.

Veteran Tamil actress Kuyili was cast as the main negative lead Annapurani, making her comeback to acting in Tamil serials after 4 years. Her last approach in Zee Tamil serial Ninaithale Inikkum. Gayatri Shastri was cast in the important role as Sumathi, for her notable performance in Roja. The series also reunited R. Karuna Vilasini, Shakthi and Ajay Rathnam who previously acted together in Pandian Stores 2. Vichithra was cast as Police officer S. Kalaiyarasi in special appearances.

=== Release ===
On 1 January 2026, the first Launch promo was released, which gave a brief insight into both Meenakshi and Jeevanatham's lives. The second promo was unveiled on 11 January 2026, featuring Annapurani's family intrusion story and main plot of the series. on 19 January, revealing the release date.

It began airing on Zee Tamil, from 26 January on Monday to Saturday at 21:30, replacing Parijatham time slot.
