= Rajavukku Check =

2020 film directed by Sai Rajkumar

- Theatrical release poster
- Directed by: Sai Rajkumar
- Produced by: Soman Pallatte; Thomas Kokkatt
- Starring: Cheran; Irfan; Srushti Dange; Sarayu
- Cinematography: M. S. Prabhu
- Edited by: C. S. Prem
- Music by: Vinod Yajamanya
- Production company: Pallatte Kokkatt Film House
- Distributed by: SDC PICTUREZ
- Release date: 24 January 2020
- Running time: 124 minutes
- Country: India
- Language: Tamil

Rajavukku Check (transl. Checkmate for king) is a 2020 Indian Tamil-language action thriller film written and directed by Sai Rajkumar. The film stars Cheran in the lead role, Irfan as antagonist with actresses Srushti Dange, Sarayu and Nandana Varma, Saara Subbiah kr in supporting roles. The film features music composed by Vinod Yajamaanyaa and cinematography by M. S. Prabhu.

== Cast ==
- Cheran as Raja Senthoor Pandian
- Irfan as Akshay
- Srushti Dange as Aadhira
- Sarayu Mohan as Gowri, Raja Senthoor Pandian's wife
- Nandhana Varma as Raja Senthoor Pandian's daughter
- Robo Chandru as a police officer
- Saara Subbiah KR as a police officer

== Production ==
Director Sai Rajkumar, best known for making Mazhai (2005) and Hello Premistara (2007), made a comeback as a director through the project. The film also marked the debut of Malayalam film producers Soman Pallatte and Thomas Kokkatt in the Tamil film industry. Cheran was cast in the lead role of the investigative thriller after some time away from films, and was Rajkumar's first pick for the script. Actresses Srushti Dange, Sarayu and Nandana Varma were signed to play pivotal roles, with the latter portraying the role of Cheran's daughter.

The film began its shoot in early 2018 but production was briefly stopped owing to an industry-wide strike. The entire shoot, barring one song, was over by May 2018. The film was also delayed as a result of Cheran's directorial commitments for the film, Thirumanam (2019).

== Critical reception ==
Sify rated 2 out of 5 stars stating "Had he concentrated more in the execution part, the film would have become an edge of the seat thriller!". The Times of India rated 2.5 out of 5 stars stating "A half-decent thriller that fails to live up to the potential of its plot".
