= Lagaan (soundtrack) =

Soundtrack album by A. R. Rahman
- Released: 6 April 2001
- Recorded: 2000–2001; Panchathan Record Inn, Chennai
- Genres: Feature film soundtrack; world music; western classical music
- Length: 41:58
- Label: Sony Music
- Producer: A. R. Rahman

A. R. Rahman chronology
Love You Hamesha (2001)	Lagaan (2001)	Star (2001)

Lagaan is the soundtrack from the film Lagaan. It was composed by A. R. Rahman, with lyrics by Javed Akhtar. The soundtrack is made up of six songs and two instrumental pieces. Rahman incorporated several music styles and genres to create the soundtrack. The track "Radha Kaise Na Jale" is loosely based on Raga Abheri/Bhimpalasi, while "Chale Chalo" is based on Raga Jog.

== Track listing ==
All lyrics written by Javed Akhtar, except track no. 4, with Hindi lyrics written by Javed Akhtar and English lyrics written by Farhan Akhtar (albeit uncredited). All music composed by A. R. Rahman.

Vocals for Aamir Khan were supplied by Udit Narayan in all songs but one.

No.	Title	Singer(s)	Length
1.	"Ghanan Ghanan (Pilu)"	Udit Narayan, Sukhwinder Singh, Alka Yagnik, Ahir, Shankar Mahadevan, Shaan, Chorus	6:11
2.	"Mitwa"	Udit Narayan, Sukhwinder Singh, Alka Yagnik, Srinivas	6:47
3.	"Radha Kaise Na Jale (Raga Bhimpalasi)"	Asha Bhosle, Udit Narayan, Vaishali Samant, Chorus	5:34
4.	"O Rey Chhori"	Udit Narayan, Alka Yagnik, Vasundhara Das	5:59
5.	"Chale Chalo"	A. R. Rahman, Srinivas	6:40
6.	"O Paalanhaare"	Lata Mangeshkar, Udit Narayan, Sadhana Sargam, Chorus	5:19
7.	"Lagaan...Once Upon a Time in India"	Anuradha Sriram	4:12
8.	"Waltz for a Romance"	Instrumental	2:29
Total length:			41:58

== Reception ==
The Los Angeles Times said that the "songs and dances are not mere interludes inserted in the action, bringing it to a halt—a Bollywood trademark—but are fully integrated into the plot and marked by expressive, dynamic singing and dancing that infuse a historical drama with energy and immediacy." The reviewer of Screen India said, "Great music, heard after a long time, which elevates your senses. That Rahman's among the best is proved here." The soundtrack was ranked No. 44 on Amazon.com's "The 100 Greatest World Music Albums of All Time". The soundtrack won 3 National Film Awards in three categories. A. R. Rahman won the award for the best music, Udit Narayan won the Best Male Playback Singer Award for "Mitwa" and Javed Akhtar won the Best Lyrics Award for "Ghanan Ghanan" and "Radha Kaise Na Jale". Lagaan also became the biggest audio hit of the year by topping the music charts and selling 3.5 million records within a year. According to the Indian trade website Box Office India, with around 28,00,000 units sold, this film's soundtrack album was the year's fourth highest-selling.

== Sales ==
Region	Certification	Certified units/sales
India (IMI)	—	3,000,000
