= Devathaiyai Kanden =

2005 film by Boopathy Pandian

- DVD cover
- Directed by: Boopathy Pandian
- Written by: Boopathy Pandian
- Produced by: M. A. Kajamaideen; K. Aayisha
- Starring: Dhanush; Sridevi Vijaykumar
- Cinematography: M. V. Panneerselvam; Prasad Murella
- Music by: Deva
- Production company: Roja Combines
- Release date: 14 January 2005
- Running time: 156 minutes
- Country: India
- Language: Tamil

Devathaiyai Kanden (transl. I Saw an Angel) is a 2005 Indian Tamil-language romantic drama film written and directed by Boopathy Pandian in his directorial debut. It stars Dhanush and Sridevi Vijaykumar in the lead roles, while Karunas and Kunal play supporting roles. The film shares its name with a song from another Dhanush film, Kaadhal Kondein (2003). Devathaiyai Kanden was released on 14 January 2005 and was a commercial success. The film was remade in Kannada as Jaaji Mallige (2009).

== Plot ==
Babu is a struggling tea vendor in Chennai, who makes a living by selling milk tea, carrying the business on his bicycle. He falls in love with Uma, a rich college girl. Gradually, Uma also reciprocates Babu's feelings for his good nature, and things go smoothly for a while.

Uma's parents find her a groom Bala, who is wealthy and well-educated. Uma is in a dilemma about whom to choose as her life partner. She thinks of her future if she chooses the impoverished Babu, where she visualises herself giving birth to a child in a government hospital, her husband unable to raise the required money for her medical expenses, and overall a complicated life; in contrast to a life where everyone pampers her, her every need is taken care of almost instantly if she chooses to marry Bala.

While Babu is on a religious trip to Sabarimala, Uma decides to marry Bala so that she can continue to lead a comfortable life. Babu is devastated when he learns of this and heartbroken when Uma goes to the extent of shouting at him. He accuses her parents of changing her mind.

Babu attempts suicide during a Valentine's Day gathering and is arrested. He is taken to the police station and beaten up by an inspector. Babu's best friend 'Kaduppu' Subramani pleads with the inspector, saying that he and Babu are orphans and there is no one to ask after them if they get killed. This changes the inspector's mind and makes him look at Babu's plight kindly, and he agrees to file a case against Uma.

Babu files a case against Uma for not holding the promise made to him of sharing a life for a good 50 years. The case soon gathers momentum and has the public discussing it everywhere. As the case progresses, several sacrifices made by Babu for the sake of Uma come to light through revelations made by people known to him and by his close friends. Uma has a change of heart and, on the final day of the hearing, decides to reunite with Babu.

When Uma offers an apology letter with a rose to Babu, he refuses to accept her, saying that the case was filed not to win her back, but as a warning to prevent others from suffering like him. He justifies by saying that yesterday she hated him because of his status, but today she loves him, and tomorrow she may again find him unattractive. Babu also says that as he cannot speak English, she left him. While leaving the court complex, much to the surprise of the visibly embarrassed Uma, he utters his last word to her in what little English he knows, "Goodbye".

== Cast ==
- Dhanush as Babu
- Sridevi Vijaykumar as Umamaheshwari (Uma)
- Karunas as 'Kaduppu' Subramani
- Kunal as Balasubramaniam (Bala)
- Mayilsamy as Mayil
- Sathyan
- Mumtaj (special appearance in the item number "Thunda Kanom Thuniya Kanom")
- Ragasiya (special appearance in the item number "Orey Oru Thoppula")
- Nassar as Babu's advocate
- Thalaivasal Vijay as Uma's advocate
- Rajeev as Viswanathan
- Ponnambalam as Police Inspector
- Srikanth as Judge
- Mohan Raman
- Fathima Babu as Uma's mother
- Paravai Muniyamma as Uma's grandmother
- T. P. Gajendran
- Suryakanth
- Bayilvan Ranganathan
- Nellai Siva
- Vellai Subbaiah
- Crane Manohar as Babu's foster brother
- Benjamin
- Winner Ramachandran
- Cool Suresh as Rowdy
- Pasi Sathya
- Theni Kunjarammal

== Production ==
In October 2002, Dhanush signed a film titled Ennai Mattum Kadhal Pannu (transl. Love me only) soon after the success of his debut film Thulluvadho Ilamai. The venture, which is the directorial debut of Boopathy Pandian, was also set to star Dhanush's Thulluvadho Ilamai co-star Sherin. The film was later retitled Kadhalna Summava (transl. Is love a joke?) and then finally as Devathaiyai Kanden. Sridevi Vijaykumar replaced Sherin. Despite being announced in 2002, the film faced delays because the production company Roja Combines postponed the shooting schedules. Amidst this, Dhanush prioritised other films including Kaadhal Kondein, Thiruda Thirudi (both in 2003), Pudhukottaiyilirundhu Saravanan, Sullan and Dreams (all in 2004). He also worked on a number of dropped films during the period including K. S. Ravikumar's Odipolaama, Selvaraghavan's Doctors, and Sibi Chakravarthy's Raghava. This was Sridevi's last film release in Tamil. While filming a scene where his character eats 15 green chilies, Dhanush really ate that many green chilies to exhibit a realistic look and expressions.

== Soundtrack ==
Devathaiyai Kanden

Soundtrack album by Deva
- Released: 2005
- Genre: Feature film soundtrack
- Length: 23:48
- Language: Tamil
- Label: Think Music

Deva chronology
Ramakrishna (2004)	Devathaiyai Kanden (2005)	Girivalam (2005)
External audio
- Devathaiyai Kanden – Jukebox on YouTube

The soundtrack was composed by Deva.

Track listing
No.	Title	Lyrics	Singer(s)	Length
1.	"Azhage Brammanidam"	Pa. Vijay	Harish Raghavendra, Ganga Sitharasu	4:30
2.	"Ore Oru Thopula"	Velam C. Manohar	Sabesh, Srilekha Parthasarathy	5:30
3.	"Maama Paiya"	Na. Muthukumar	Ranjith	4:45
4.	"Thundai Kaanom"	Thiraivannan	Dhanush, Anuradha Sriram	4:58
5.	"Velakku Onnu"	Pa. Vijay	Yugendran, Grace Karunas	4:05
Total length:				23:48

== Release and reception ==
Devathaiyai Kanden was released on 14 January 2005, during Pongal. Malini Mannath of Chennai Online wrote "It is Bhoopathypandian's first directorial venture and he can be appreciated for trying out something out of the routine here. If only he had polished up the earlier scenes too!". Visual Dasan of Kalki praised Pandian's direction, the performances of Dhanush and Sridevi. Malathi Rangarajan of The Hindu wrote, "Coherence is a casualty in [Devathaiyai Kanden] and so is tautness. The first half just languishes in light-hearted happenings that are anything but funny. It is in the last hour that the story gains some momentum". Sify wrote, "Bhoopthy Pandian, the debutant director has no clue about what he was trying to convey to the audience. All the characters are etched out in poor light and less said about the lead pair, the better! For a change, Deva’s lifted music is a blessing. The story, script, presentation is amateurish and the direction is incredibly lifeless and uninvolving".
