= Meiyyazhagi =

2013 Tamil film by RT Jayavel

- Release poster
- Directed by: RT Jayavel
- Starring: Balaji; Arjun; Jai Quehaeni
- Cinematography: Venkatesh Arjun
- Music by: S. B. Abhishek
- Release date: 22 November 2013
- Country: India
- Language: Tamil

Meiyyazhagi (transl. True beauty) is a 2013 Indian Tamil-language drama film directed by RT Jayavel and starring Balaji, Arjun and Jai Quehaeni. The film is about the love between a sister and her brother, who is affected by cerebral palsy.

== Cast ==
- Balaji as Deva
- Arjun as Partha
- Jai Quehaeni as Meiyyazhagi
- Arunmozhi Varman
- Ramraj as Arjun's father
- Velmurugan in a cameo appearance

== Soundtrack ==
The music is composed by S. P. Balasubrahmanyam's son Abhishek.

- "En Pera Naane Maruntheneda Unna Nenachu"

== Reception ==
A critic from The Times of India gave the film a rating of one-and-a-half out of five stars and wrote that "The problem with Meiyyazhagi is that it is 30 years too late". A critic from Dinamalar gave the film a mixed review and said that the screenplay could have been handled better and that Balaji overacted while praising the film's music and cinematography. On the contrary, a critic from Hindu Tamil Thisai praised the director's treatment of the storyline, the lead actors' performance and the music.
