= Uyirukku Uyiraga =

- Theatrical release poster
- Directed by: Vijaya Manojkumar
- Produced by: Kovaithambi
- Starring: Prabhu; Sharran Kumar; Sanjeev; Nandhana; Preethi Das
- Cinematography: Anand Kumar
- Music by: Santha Kumar
- Production company: Vendhar Productions
- Distributed by: Vendhar Movies
- Release date: 13 June 2014
- Country: India
- Language: Tamil

Uyirukku Uyiraga (transl. Heartiest) is a 2014 Indian Tamil-language film directed by Vijaya Manojkumar and produced by Kovaithambi. The film stars Sharran Kumar, Sanjeev, Nandhana and Preethi Das.

== Cast ==
- Prabhu as Rangasamy
- Sharran Kumar as Karthik
- Sanjeev as Suriya
- Nandhana as Priya
- Preethi Das as Pinky
- Sriranjani as Lakshmi
- Sathish as Sathish
- Raj Kapoor as HOD
- Boys Rajan as Priya's father
- A. R. Rangabashyam
- Surekha
- Supergood Subramani as Police officer

== Production ==
Uyirukku Uyiraga is the 25th film of Manoj Kumar and marks his return to directing after a sabbatical; with this film, he renamed himself Vijaya Manojkumar. It also marks the return of Kovaithambi to producing since Chembaruthi (1992); previously he announced a film named Yen Ippadi Mayakinay in 2008, which never released despite completion. The film, produced by Vendhar Productions, has cinematography by Anand Kumar. Punjabi actress Preethi Das plays a college girl in the film.

== Themes ==
Manojkumar stated that the theme of the film is education, and the "relationship between a father and his son. Many parents, fathers especially, think that their responsibility towards their children ends with providing them with good education and helping them settle in their chosen career. They feign indifference, or completely oppose it, when their kids fall in love. This film is all about how a father must help his kid if he's taken a wrong step in romance."

== Soundtrack ==
The soundtrack was composed by Santha Kumar. "Venum Venum", a gaana song written by Manojkumar, is sung by Velmurugan and Chinnaponnu. "Enakku Theriyamal" and "Kaaichal" are "romantic melodies". The Holi-themed "Jhoom Le", written by Snehan, includes Hindi lyrics, given its Uttaranchal setting. A song written by Gana Bala and sung by Sharran and Madhu was planned to be included in the film.

== Reception ==
Anupama Subramanian of Deccan Chronicle wrote, "Vijaya Manojumar is back after a gap wielding megaphone. Though he tries to impart a good message, the incoherent screenplay plays the spoilsport. While the first half is bland, post interval it picks up momentum." Maalai Malar too criticised the first half and said the second half was better, praised the music and Anand Kumar's cinematography, but concluded that the film overall lacked life.
