= Kana Kaanum Kaalangal (2006 TV series) =

- Genre: Coming-of-age; Teen; Romance; Comedy; Soap opera
- Created by: S. Ramana Girivasan; Bramma
- Screenplay by: Bramma; S.Ramana Girivasan; Dialogue; Bramma; Sa.Murali Manohar; Sheeba Prabhu; S.Ramana Girivasan
- Story by: Bramma; S.Ramana Girivasan
- Directed by: Season 1 Prabhu Radhakrishnan; Season 1, 2 & 3 Kumar Raja; Season 2, 4 episodes Tamil Bharathi; Season 2, 4 episodes G. Anbazhagan
- Starring: Hemalatha; Monisha Ravishankar; Yuthan Balaji; Irfan; S. Sheva; Sriram; Vignesh Kumar; Priya Atlee; Kiran Konda
- Theme music composer: Vijay Antony
- Composer: C. K. Ganesh
- Country of origin: India
- Original language: Tamil
- No. of seasons: 2
- No. of episodes: 499

Production
- Producers: Season 1 Raghavesh Asthana; Season 1 & 2 R. Rajeshwari
- Production locations: Chennai; Kodaikanal; Coimbatore; Trichy; Madurai; Thanjavur
- Cinematography: E. Martin Joe
- Editors: A. R. Bennyraj; Raju
- Camera setup: Multi-camera
- Running time: Approx. 19 minutes
- Production companies: Season 1 - Season 2 Time Frames

Original release
- Network: Star Vijay
- Release: 30 October 2006 – 28 April 2009

Related
- Kana Kaanum Kaalangal Oru Kallooriyin Kadhai; Kana Kaanum Kaalangal Kalloori Saalai; Kana Kaanum Kaalangal 2022

Kana Kaanum Kaalangal (transl. Era of Dreams) is a Tamil drama soap opera that aired in Star Vijay, Monday to Thursday, from 30 October 2006 to 28 April 2009. It was the first soap in Tamil television that focused on school life. Due to the success of the show, a sequel called Kana Kaanum Kaalangal Kallooriyin Kadhai was made. Later another sequel to the serial called Kana Kaanum Kalangal Kalloori Saalai was also made. Both the sequels focused on college life. It was re-aired on Star Vijay Super from 16 January 2017, Monday through Friday at 8:00PM.

== Plot ==
The story is set in school revolving around 12 students, separated into 2 groups. The plot details the rivalry between these 2 groups and the consequences of this. Everyday happenings of the student life are portrayed in this series to very minute details like healthy competition, fights, family matters, ego, jealousy, love and friendship.

== Cast ==
=== School season ===
Season 1

- Hemalatha as Raghavi
- S. Sheva (Rishikesh) as Bala (Thala)
- Mohamed Irfan (Irfan) as Vineeth
- Yuthan Balaji as Joseph "Joe"
- Lingeswaran (Black Pandi) as Pandi (Black Pandi)
- Hariharan "Hari" as Krishnamoorthy "Krish"
- Vasudeva Krish Madhusudhan "Madhu" as Pachaiyappan "Pachai"
- Stalin Shanmugavel as Rishi
- Iyappan as Unni Menon "Unni"
- Monisha Ravishankar as Sanghavi
- Kothai as Deepa
- Sheron as Ragini
- Preethi (Pavithra) as Saraswathi "Sis"
- Sri Ram (Sri) as Sri Ram "Sri"
- Kiran Konda as Madan
- Dinesh Prabhakaran "Dinesh" as Rakesh "Rocky"
- Sarath as Lingeswaran "Lingu"
- Ravikumar as Aadhi
- Ramesh Appunu as Thomas "Tom"
- Priya Atlee as Priya
- Bhanu Chander as Rajendran, Sanghavi's father and Raghavi's adopted father
- Rekha as Lakshmi, Sanghavi's mother and Raghavi's adopted mother
- Raghavendran Ravi as Pulikesi (Puli Gates/Sullan)
- Sriram Chandrasekar (Gadam Kishan) as Ramakrishnan "Kichcha"/(Kishan)
- Poornima as Karthika "Karthi"
- Haritha as Mintu
- Vaishnavi as Mano
- Chander as a school student
- Sabarna as a school student
- Ilavarasan as Raghavi's biological father
- Meera Krishnan as Raghavi's biological mother
- Naren (Aadukalam Naren) as Chidambaram, correspondent
- Anbazhagan "Anbu" as PT Peeli Sivam, PT master
- Jeeva as Jeeva, biology teacher
- Kalpana Sri as Madhavi, principal
- Raviraj as Gabriel Arokyaraj, Joseph's father & chemistry teacher
- Senthi Kumari as teacher
- S. R. Kaviya Varshini Arun as Bharathi, English teacher
- Saakshi Siva as Vineeth's father
- Peeli Sivam as Moorthy
- Brindha Das as Vineeth's mother
- Ramana Ramakrishnan as Bala's father
- Nesan as Deepa's brother-in-law
- Jhayasundari as Deepa' mother
- Sachin as Bala's brother
- Kuyili as Jeeva's mother
- Shylaja Chetlur as Krishnamoorthy's mother
- Engineer Srinivasan as Rajendran's father
- Kousalya Senthamarai as Rajammal, Rajendran's mother
- S. Ramakrishnan as Bala's father
- Rathnaraj as Kathiresan, police Inspector
- Chelladurai as Pandi's father
- Shobana as Pandi's mother
- Theni Murugan as Murugan, Pachaiyappan's father and school sweeper
- Sumathi Sri as Kamakshi, Pachaiyappan's mother
- Pasi Sathya as Pandi's aunt
- Minnal Deepa as PT Peeli Sivam's wife
- Suchithra as Ramya, Raghavi's sister
- Ganesh Babu as teacher
- Jayakanthan as Shanmuganathan, teacher
- Karnaa Radha as teacher
- Vincent as Vincent, teacher
- Birla Bose as police inspector
- Vinoth as Ilam Parithi
- Rangadhurai (Rajaguru) as Jeevan group's PT master
- Master Udayaraj as mechanic
- Sivakarthikeyan as himself (special appearance)
- Cheran as himself (special appearance)
- Deepak Dinkar as himself (special appearance)
- Venkat as Himself (special appearance)
- Divyadharshini "DD" as herself (special appearance)
- Nisha Venkat as herself (special appearance)
- Sruthi as herself (special appearance)
- Nancy Jennifer as herself (special appearance)
- Swaminathan as Gaja/Aalaiyamani (Temple bell) (special appearance)
- Gowthami Vembunathan as herself (special appearance)
- Athul Prasanth (special appearance)
- Savio (special appearance)
- Martina seles(Child artist)
- Dilip kumar(class leader)

Season 2

- Sri Ram "Sri" as Sri Ram "Sri"
- Vignesh Kumar "Vicky Krish" as Vignesh "Vicky"
- Kiran Konda as Madan
- Dinesh Prabhakaran "Dinesh" as Rakesh "Rocky"
- Ravikumar as Aadhi
- Ramesh Appunu as Thomas "Tom"
- Priya Atlee as Priya
- Hema as Hema
- Michael Thangadurai as Michael Varadharaj
- Raghavendran Ravi as Pulikesi "Puli"(Puli Gates/Sullan)
- Jhony as Jhony
- Prabhu as Prabhu
- Udhay as Udhay
- Sriram Chandrasekar (Gadam Kishan) as Ramakrishnan "Kichcha"/(Kishan)
- Monica
- Hemalatha as Raghavi
- Ligeswaran (Black Pandi) as Pandi (Black Pandi)
- Vasudeva Krish Madhusudhan "Madhu" as Pachaiyappan "Pachai"
- Stalin Shanmugavel as Rishi
- Iyappan as Unni Menon "Unni"
- Bhavya Rajan as Bhavya
- Venkat Renganathan as a student
- Azhagappan as a student
- Bala Saravanan as a student
- Anandhi Ajay as a student
- Sri Vidya Nagarajan as a student
- Anbazhagan "Anbu" as PT Peeli Sivam
- R. Raveendran "R. Ravi"/(Jeeva Ravi) as Sri Ram, Vignesh and Bhavya's father
- Y. V. Subaramaniam as Correspondent
- Deepa Nethran as Vicky and Bhavya's mother and Sri Ram's step mother
- Usha Elizabeth as Sri Ram's mother and Vignesh and Bhavya's step mother
- Kamal Haasan (Kamal Bharathi) as Kamal Haasan, English teacher
- Raviraj as Gabriel Arokyaraj, principal
- Rathnaraj as police inspector
- Chelladurai as Pandi's father
- Theni Murugan as Murugan, Pachaiyappan's father and school sweeper
- Pattukkottai Sivanarayana Moorthy as Pulikesi's grandfather
- Varalakshmi as Pulikesi's grandmother
- Suryakanth as Pechiyammal's father and Pandi's uncle
- Vinoth (Larawin) as Larawin, dance master
- Vincent as Vincent, teacher
- Birla Bose as a police inspector
- Sivakarthikeyan as himself (special appearance)
- Shreekumar "Shree" as himself (special appearance)
- Dev Anand as himself (special appearance)
- Tinku as himself (special appearance)
- Divyadharshini "DD" as herself (special appearance)
- Swaminathan as Gaja/Aalaiyamani (Temple bell) (special appearance)
- Roopesh as himself (special appearance)

=== College season ===
Season 1

- Karthik Raj as Karthikeyan "Karthi"
- Prem Kumar "Prem" (Vetri) as Vetri
- Sai Pramodita as Jeyalaxmi "Jeya"
- Swetha Krishnan as Swetha
- Swetha Subramanian as Jyothika "Jyo"
- Bala Saravanan as Bala
- Ramesh Thilak in a dual role as Azhagesan alias Al Gates(Protagonist)and Sanjay (Antagonist)
- Chathrien Rajan as Chathri "Kathadi"
- Franklin as Appu
- Vishnu Vijay (Vishnu) as Ashokan "Ashok"
- Haripriya Isai as Priya
- Ganesh Prabhu as Saravanan "Saravnana"
- Nisha Krishnan as Divya
- Jacqueline Prakash as Nila
- Rajani Ravikumar as Rajini
- Harini as Harini
- Laddu Vidya as Vidya (Laddu)
- Sandhya as Sandhya
- Monalisa as Monalisa
- Mithra as Mithra
- Kushboo as Thamizharasi
- Sakthi as Sakthi
- Lingeswaran (Black Pandi) as Thangappandi
- Dinesh as Rakesh "Rocky"
- Raghavendran as Jakkubhai "Jakku"
- Sriram Chandrasekar (Gadam Kishan)
- Karthick Vasudevan "Vasu" as Vasu
- Madhan Pandian "Madhan" as Madhan
- Bala Krishnan "Bala" as Inba
- Sindhu Shyam as correspondent
- Suzane George as a lecturer
- S. Rajasekar as Rajasekar
- Raviraj as a lecturer
- R. Raveendran "R. Ravi" (Jeeva Ravi) as Manohar, secretary
- Thirumurugan Duraisamy as Thiru (Sullan)
- Halwa Vasu
- Suryakanth as MLA, Thangapandi's father
- Vadivel Balaji
- Robo Shankar
- T. Sivakumar (Pasanga Sivakumar) as Saravanan's father
- Usha Elizabeth as Elizabeth
- Dhanasekaran (Mullai)
- Monkey Ravi
- Ananth Vaidyanathan as himself (special appearance)
- Divya Vijaygopal as herself (special appearance)
- Sathish Krishnan as himself (special appearance in the title song)

Season 2

- Prem Kumar "Prem" (Vetri) as Vetri
- Kavirajan (Kavin Raj/Kavin) as Siva
- Rio Raj as Palani
- Raju Jeyamohan as Jeevanantham "Jeeva"
- RJ Shivakanth as Kathiresan "Kathir"
- Asritha Sreedas as Sandhya
- Vaishali Radhakrishnan (Swetha) as Vaishali
- Sai Gayatri Bhuvanesh as Manjula
- Rishika Suman as Stella
- Abinaya as Thenu
- Sanchana Natarajan as Sanjana
- Britto Mano as Britto
- Pavel Mani as Mani
- Sridhar as Raghunath, college correspondent/Shiva and Vetri's father
- Deepa Nethran as Lakshmi, lecturer/Shiva's mother and Vetri's stepmother
- Lakshmi as Vetri's mother and Shiva's stepmother
- Pooja as Pooja, lecturer
- T. V. V. Ramanujam as Kathir's father
- Shobana as Kathir's mother
- Boys Rajan as Menon principal
- Halwa Vasu as Vasu
- Suryakanth as Palani's father
- Shiva Aravind as Shiva

== Soundtrack ==
The title song was composed by the music director Vijay Antony and the background score was composed by C. .K. Ganesh with lyrics written by Thenmozhi Das. The title song video was directed by Shiran Mather.

Track listing
No.	Title	Lyrics	Music	Singer(s)	Length
1.	"Kanavugal Kaanum Vayasuachu"	Thenmozhi Das	Vijay Antony	C. Sathya, Maya	3:31
2.	"Farewell Anthem"	Kannadasan, Vaali, Thenmozhi Das	C. K. Ganesh		3:04
3.	"Collegeuda Teenageuda"	Yugabharathi	Hari Krishna	Aalap Raju	3:15
4.	"Unnai Kanda Naalil Thane"	Arun Raja	M. Britto	Ajesh, Santhosh, Ragini, Pooja

== Awards and nominations ==
Year	Award	Category	Recipient	Role	Result
2014	Vijay Television Awards	Favourite Fiction Series	Kana Kaanum Kaalangal		Won
2014	Vijay Television Awards	Favourite Comedian Fiction	Lingeswaran	Black Pandi	Nominated

== Production ==
=== Casting ===
Star Vijay conducted a talent search and students between 14 and 22 years were shortlisted and selected for the serial except Hemalatha and Ligeswaran, who had prior acting experience. All others were students who were acting for the first time to make the serial as close to reality as possible. Following the success of season 1 of the series, season 2 was started with fresh new faces and were promoted to 12th standard. When the producer and director announced the interview for the selection of the cast for second season, it was said that nearly 2000 applicants applied and they had a very tough time in short listing the participants in the selection.

=== Filming ===
This series was filmed in Chennai, Kodaikanal, Coimbatore, Trichy, Madurai, Thanjavur, Nagapattinam, Rameswaram & Sinthamani.

== Reception ==
Kana Kaanum Kaalangal went on to top the TRP ratings among the other Tamil serials during its telecast. In 2007, the series had recorded its highest rating of 7.7 TVR in Chennai which helped to increase Star Vijay's average channel share by 16.4 per cent in Chennai and the series was in the leading position among the other Tamil serials which were telecasted during the same time slot, achieving an average channel share by 16.2 per cent in Tamil Nadu.

In June 2007, the series had completed its 100th episode. In order to celebrate the milestone that the series had achieved, a live chat was organized on indya.com through which the fans got an opportunity to interact with the team members of the series. On 10 June 2007, Star Vijay had also organized a fan meet for the series "Kana Kaanum Kaalangal Carnival" at St. George's School, Chennai. The carnival had witnessed more than thousands of fans who had gathered to meet the lead actors and actresses of the series.

== Legacy ==
Kana Kaanum Kaalangal was a trendsetter series in Tamil television in many ways since almost all the artists of the series were fresh faces for whom the series was their 1st acting assignment or they had earlier appeared as child artists/uncredited extras in serials or movies. The artists for the lead characters were selected by a talent hunt conducted by Star Vijay with a judge panel consisting of Praveen Gandhi, Vasu Vikram and Prabhu Radhakrishnan, moreover, an acting workshop was also conducted by Kalairani for the artists who were selected to play the lead characters. This series marked the debut of many artists as well as technicians for whom the series became a major breakthrough following its grand success. Most of the artists from the series continued to work in lead/supporting roles in serials/cinema and became successful in various other domains of media and arts as well.

After 15 years of the series commencement, the grand reunion of the artists from the series from various seasons was aired as a special show on 18 July 2021 on Star Vijay.
