= Pachai Kodi =

- Directed by: Manoj Kumar
- Produced by: A. R. Santhilal Nahar; P. Srichand; M. Thangapandiyan
- Starring: Pandiarajan; Nirosha; Janagaraj; Major Sundarrajan
- Cinematography: V. Ranga
- Edited by: R. Bhaskaran
- Music by: Gangai Amaran
- Production company: Guru Sree Shanthi Productions
- Release date: 14 January 1990
- Country: India
- Language: Tamil

Pachai Kodi (transl. Green Flag) is a 1990 Indian Tamil-language film, directed by Manoj Kumar and produced by A. R. Santhilal Nahar. The film stars Pandiarajan, Nirosha, Janagaraj and Major Sundarrajan. It was released on 14 January 1990.

== Cast ==
- Pandiarajan as Balu
- Nirosha as Sheela
- Janagaraj as Kandasaamy
- Nassar as Vishwanath
- S. S. Chandran
- Major Sundarrajan
- Raasi_(actress) as Meenu (Child artist)

== Soundtrack ==
The soundtrack was composed by Gangai Amaran.

No.	Title	Lyrics	Singer(s)	Length
1.	"Vaanam Bhoomi"	Gangai Amaran	Sunandha
2.	"Maadi Veettil"	Vaali	K. S. Chithra, S. P. Balasubrahmanyam
3.	"Ennavadhu Indha"	Vaali	Gangai Amaran
4.	"Naan Pachai Kodi"	Vaali	Malaysia Vasudevan
5.	"Kadal Thodum"	Vaali	K. S. Chithra, S. P. Balasubrahmanyam
6.	"Ennavadhu Indha" (2)	Vaali	P. Jayachandran

== Reception ==
P. S. S. of Kalki praised the film's humour.
