= Maravan =

- Poster
- Directed by: Manoj Kumar
- Written by: Manoj Kumar; Sivaram Gandhi (dialogues)
- Produced by: Mohan Natarajan; Tharangai V. Shanmugam
- Starring: Prabhu; Khushbu
- Cinematography: Sekar
- Edited by: Mohan; Bhaskar
- Music by: Deva
- Production company: Sree Rajakaali Amman Enterprises
- Release date: 15 August 1993
- Running time: 135 minutes
- Country: India
- Language: Tamil

Maravan is a 1993 Indian Tamil-language action drama film directed by Manoj Kumar. The film stars Prabhu and Khushbu, with Vijayakumar, Sumithra, Napoleon, R. P. Viswam, Chandrasekhar, Thyagu, Vadivelu, Vennira Aadai Moorthy and Dakshayini playing supporting roles. It was released on 15 August 1993.

== Plot ==
Sethupathi lived in the city with his family consisting of his father Manickam, his mother Meenakshi and his sister Lakshmi. Manickam, Sethupathi's father, is an honest police officer and wanted his son to become a police officer like him. Sethupathi took the IPS exam and successfully passed it. Sethupathi was subsequently transferred to the remote village called Solaiyoor.

When he arrives in the village, Sethupathi is in a state of shock. The village is under the control of the village president Rajadurai (R. P. Viswam) and his son Shankarapandiyan, a corrupt politician. With the local rowdies, they spread terror among the villagers.

Sethupathi first changes the bad habits of the police officers, Thyagu and Vadivelu. In the meantime, Sethupathi and the village belle Thangathai fall in love with each other. One day, Sethupathi beats up and strips Rajadurai in front of villagers for cheating them, and he puts him in jail. Shankarapandi makes his father release him the next hour. The next day, Shankarapandi, Rajadurai and his henchmen take revenge by stripping the police officers and beating them. What transpires later forms the crux of the story.

== Cast ==
- Prabhu as Police Inspector Sethupathi
- Khushbu as Thangathai
- Vijayakumar as SP Manickam
- Sumithra as Meenakshi
- Napoleon as Shankarapandiyan
- R. P. Viswam as Rajadurai
- Chandrasekhar as Sekhar
- Thyagu as Police Officer
- Vadivelu as Constable Velu
- Vennira Aadai Moorthy as Iyer
- Dakshayini as Lakshmi
- Oru Viral Krishna Rao
- Sethu Vinayagam as DSP
- Thalapathy Dinesh as Muthukalai
- Boopathi Raja
- Bhavani
- Sharmili as Sinthamani
- Mohana Priya
- LIC Narasimhan
- Pasi Narayanan as Vellaisamy
- Karuppu Subbiah
- Joker Thulasi
- Thideer Kannaiah
- Singamuthu
- Gundu Kalyanam

== Soundtrack ==
The music was composed by Deva, with lyrics written by Vaali.

Song	Singer(s)	Duration
"Chandiranai Kuppidunga"	S. P. Balasubrahmanyam	3:30
"Kondiyele"	S. Janaki	5:36
"Singara Kuyilu"	S. P. Balasubrahmanyam, K. S. Chithra	4:47
"Gulaabi Gulaabi"	S. P. Balasubrahmanyam, S. Janaki	4:35
"En Ooru"	S. Janaki	4:45

== Reception ==
Malini Mannath of The Indian Express wrote, "Since the story has nothing new to offer, writer-director Manoj Kumar has tried to bring freshness in his treatment". K. Vijiyan of New Straits Times wrote that the film reminded him of Walter Vetrivel, and lamented that being edited to a shorter runtime by local exhibitors affected its narrative.
