= Yuthan Balaji =

Indian actor

- Born: Balaji Balakrishnan; 24 October 1987 (age 38); Chennai, Tamil Nadu, India
- Education: Bachelor of Science
- Alma mater: Loyola College, Chennai
- Occupation: Actor
- Years active: 2006 – present
- Known for: Kana Kaanum Kaalangal

K. Yuthan Balaji is an Indian actor who has appeared in Tamil language films. He made his debut in the 2009 ensemble film, Pattalam produced by N. Linguswamy, before featuring in Kaadhal Solla Vandhen (2010) and Nagarvalam (2017).

== Career ==
After appearing in the successful Vijay TV school drama television serial Kana Kaanum Kaalangal, Balaji and several of his co-stars were cast as the lead actors of Rohan Krishna's coming-of-age drama film Pattalam (2009). Produced by N. Linguswamy and featuring Nadhiya Moidu in a key role, the film did not perform as well as anticipated at the box office. He was then selected to play the lead role in Boopathy Pandian's Kaadhal Solla Vandhen (2010) after the film went through a change of cast. Starring opposite Meghana Raj, the film had a wide release across Tamil Nadu. He then appeared in Meiyyazhagi (2013) portraying a man with cerebral palsy and the film had a low-profile release and received mixed reviews.

He made a comeback through a romantic thriller film titled Nagarvalam in 2017, and changed his stage name from Balaji Balakrishnan to Yuthan Balaji.

With a few films where he plays chocolate boy role in his kitty, Yuthan Balaji has opted for a high action web series in the late 2018 and taken the avatar of a gangster in Vella Raja.

== Personal life ==
Balaji married Preethi in 2016. The couple divorced in 2018 due to personal issues. In 2025, he remarried Sujitha and the couple settled in Australia.

== Filmography ==
- All films are in Tamil, unless otherwise noted.

Year	Film	Role	Notes
2009	Pattalam	Jerry	
2010	Kaadhal Solla Vandhen	Prabhu	
2013	Meiyyazhagi	Deiva	
2017	Nagarvalam	Kumar	

=== Television ===
- Star Vijay - Kana Kaanum Kaalangal (2006) as Joseph
- Zee Tamizh - Dance Jodi Dance (2016) as Yuthan
- Vella Raja (2018) as Kathir
