= Thullal (film) =

- Directed by: Praveenkanth
- Written by: Praveenkanth
- Produced by: Praveenkanth
- Starring: Praveenkanth; Gurleen Chopra
- Music by: Dhina
- Release date: 29 June 2007
- Running time: 154 minutes
- Country: India
- Language: Tamil

Thullal (transl. Overjoy) is a 2007 Indian Tamil-language erotic drama film written and directed by Praveenkanth starring himself, Gurleen Chopra and Sonika. Dhina composed the film's music. Thullal which began production in 2003 had a delayed release on 19 July 2007.

== Plot ==
Seenu, with a group of friends, is a prankster, spoiled brat, and big-time womaniser. He is addicted to sex and has sex with various women at any cost. It is shown in the introduction scene where an eloped couple meets them for help and the friends pretend to help them and take away the bridegroom from the place. Seenu seduces the woman and enjoys having sex with her. Seenu's parents know about his attitude. They have advised him numerous times, but he is stubborn and considered it as a challenge by winning women's trust into having sex.

One fine day, he witnesses a group of thugs misbehaving with a girl named Shruthika. He immediately gets tempted of her and plans to help her to have sex with her. When he bashed all of the thugs, Shruthika instantly falls for him. They become good friends. One day, Seenu invites Shruthika home and seduces her, ending up with both of them having sex. After that incident, he ill-treats her and asks her to either go out of town or get her pregnancy aborted. She tearfully leaves out of town to Ooty.

Before that, in a parallel scene, Seenu witnesses Shruthika forced by a woman named Gayathiri to lodge a police complaint against the man who betrays her, but she, feeling insecure to be known this by others, takes a step back. Gayathiri abuses that guy through words unknowingly; the man is none other than Seenu. He is angry and wants to avenge this insult. He plans to marry her, and after their first night, plans to escape to Goa.

After numerous attempts, Gayathiri gets convinced by her guardian, a doctor, to marry Seenu. After numerous failed attempts to seduce her, in her house, he hatches out a plan and fixes a honeymoon plan to Ooty. There, he meets Shruthika, his ex-victim who is now a tourist guide there in Ooty. Seenu obeys his wife's instructions and pretends to be a loyal husband. Gayathiri, who knows Shruthika earlier, introduces her to Seenu. Now Gayathiri's condition is that to believe him or to start a life with him, he must resolve the pending problem in Shruthika's life. He apologises to Shruthika and promises to marry her and also tells her that he will reveal everything to his wife, but he cunningly plans to fool both his ex-lover and wife. His friend Muthu tries to reveal everything to his wife, but Seenu drugs him by mixing sleeping pills in the coffee that he drinks. Muthu ends up revealing everything to Shruthika and telling her to at least try to save Gayathiri.

Seenu successfully has sex with Gayathiri and drugs her by mixing sleeping pills in the milk, leaving her unconscious. When he was to about to escape to Goa in a bus, Shruthika captures him and brings him to a mortuary. Shruthika abuses him with words and says "You love to touch women's body. Now touch this bodies till you satisfy". He is horrified by this and realises his mistake and his life as an animal. He asks forgiveness and tries to commit suicide, which is stopped by Shruthika. Shruthika asks him to live a good life with Gayathiri as that is his lifelong punishment. Outside the mortuary, they tell the awaiting Gayathiri that her lover died in an accident. Seenu and Gayathiri are joined hands by Shruthika. Seenu and Shruthika see each other for the one last time and bid a tearful goodbye, whereas Shruthika leaves the country forever and settles in Australia.

== Cast ==
- Praveenkanth as Seenu
- Gurleen Chopra as Shruthika
- Sonika as Gayathiri, Seenu's wife
- Vivek as Muthu, Seenu's friend
- Seetha as Gayathiri's guardian and a doctor
- Manikka Vinayagam as Seenu's father
- Sumithra as Seenu's mother
- Uma Padmanabhan as Shruthika's mother
- Rajeev as Shruthika's father
- Ilavarasu as Security guard
- Benjamin as Subramani
- Manobala as Building secretary
- Vatsala Rajagopal as Shruthika's grandmother
- N. Mathrubootham as Das/Giri/Chand/Pillai/3 (uncredited)
- Kadhal Sukumar as Seenu's friend (uncredited)
- Geetha Lakshmi as Das/Giri/Chand/Pillai/3's daughter

== Production ==
The film was first reported in June 2000, when Pravinkanth worked on the film alongside commitments of directing two other projects involving Prashanth and Ajith Kumar. The film was set to be produced by Anbalaya Films. Chaya Singh was briefly attached to the project during 2003 before opting out. The filming was held at Chennai, Munnar and Pondicherry.

== Soundtrack ==
Soundtrack was composed by Dhina.

| Song | Singers | Lyrics |
|---|---|---|
| "Kollathe" | Dhina, Anita Udeep | Pa. Vijay |
| "Kokkarikkum" | T. L. Maharajan, Uma Padmanabhan | Yugabharathi |
| "Seikooli Undu" | Silambarasan, Paravai Muniyamma | Yugabharathi |
| "Sight Adicha" | Ranjith, Aishwarya | Kalaikumar |
| "Sagala Ponnu" | Shankar Mahadevan, Ganga | Kalaikumar |
| "Thappu Pannatha" | Manikka Vinayagam, Malathy | Tha. Kannan |

== Critical reception ==
The film was cleared by the censor board in April 2006. Sify wrote, "The only thing that may tempt you to take a risk to watch Thullal is Vivek?s hilarious comedy track, otherwise there is nothing in it. The basic problem is Praveen's self indulgence and misplaced sense of self importance in his very first film as a hero! The audience might stomach an Ajit, Vijay or Surya playing a Casanova and frolicking with lovely girls but definitely not a Praveen Kant". Malini Mannath of Chennai Online wrote, "'Thullal' is about the sexual exploitation of women and about how they should be treated with respect... But in getting his message through, the director too has done his bit of exploitation. It's in the way he has exploited the glamour quotient of his women characters, and in projecting them as naïve and gullible, and devoid of any intelligence". Vinopriya of Kalki wrote although the story of cheating women is taken, the director sticks to the obscenity without introducing any innovation. Malathi Rangarajan of The Hindu wrote, "The least Pravinkanth could do is stick to writing and direction. Trying to turn hero seems too ambitious a step".
