= Inidhu Inidhu =

2010 film directed by K. V. Guhan

- Directed by: K. V. Guhan
- Written by: Prakash Raj
- Story by: Sekhar Kammula
- Based on: Happy Days
- Produced by: Prakash Raj
- Starring: Adith; Narayan; Sharran; Vimal Sarangan; Sonia Deepti; Reshmi Menon; Benaas; Gia Umar; Sunny Sawrav; Abhishek; Krishna; Ajay; Satish
- Cinematography: K. V. Guhan
- Edited by: Don Max
- Music by: Mickey J. Meyer
- Production company: Duet Movies
- Release date: 20 August 2010
- Running time: 190 minutes
- Country: India
- Language: Tamil

Inidhu Inidhu (transl. Sweet, sweet) is a 2010 Indian Tamil language musical coming of age film directed by K. V. Guhan, starring eight newcomers in lead roles. It is a remake of the 2007 Telugu film Happy Days. It was produced by Prakash Raj under his banner, Duet Movies. It has music by Mickey J. Meyer, the composer of the original film, making his debut in Tamil. The film was released on 20 August 2010. Much of the shooting was done at VIT University, India.

== Plot ==
Inidhu Inidhu depicts the happy college days of a group of undergraduate students. Freshmen Siddhu (Adith), Aravind alias Tyson (Narayan), Vimal (Vimal), Shankar (Shravan), Madhu (Reshmi), Aparna aka Appu and Jiya join an upmarket college in the city. Each of them comes from different states of the country. They are ragged by the seniors at the college which makes them bond with each other.

== Cast ==
- Adith as Siddharth (Siddhu)
- Narayan as Arvind (Tyson)
- Sharran as Shankar
- Vimal Sarangan as Vimal
- Sonia as Shravanthi (Shravs)
- Reshmi as Madhubala (Madhu)
- Benaas as Aparna (Appu)
- Gia Umar as Sangeetha
- Sunny Sawrav as Sanny Balboa
- Krishna as Sanjay
- Abhi Ram as Arjun
- Ajay as Ajay
- Abhishek Vinod as College senior
- Prasath
- Anjala Zaveri as Shreya Madam (Guest Appearance)
- Satish as Satish (Guest Appearance)

== Soundtrack ==
The music was composed by Mickey J. Meyer and released by Sony Music India. The audio was launched on 1 August 2010, by Prakash Raj.

Inidhu Inidhu

Soundtrack album by Mickey J. Meyer
- Released: 1 August 2010
- Recorded: 2010
- Genre: Soundtrack
- Length: 35:57
- Label: Sony Music India
- Producer: Mickey J. Meyer

Mickey J. Meyer chronology
Maro Charitra (2010)	Inidhu Inidhu (2010)	Anaganaga O Dheerudu (2010)

All tracks are written by Vairamuthu.

Track-List
No.	Title	Singer(s)	Length
1.	"Ammakale O Appakale"	Krishna Chaitanya, Aditya, Kranthi, Sasikiran, Sidharth	5:45
2.	"Inbam Ethirilae"	Karthik, Timmy, Grid Lock	4:11
3.	"Inidhu Inidhu"	Karthik	5:13
4.	"Vaazhkai Oru"	Karthik	5:42
5.	"Ennangal Vaannoki"	Kalyani Nair	5:20
6.	"Kodi Kanavu Kannil"	Naresh Iyer	3:46
7.	"Kalloori Thayeh"	Ilayaraja	6:00
Total length:			35:57
