= Pattalam (2009 film) =

- Poster
- Directed by: Rohan Krishna
- Written by: Rohan Krishna; Sheeba Rohan
- Produced by: N. Subash Chandrabose
- Starring: Nadhiya; Yuthan Balaji; Arun; Hariharan; Irfan; Deepthi Nambiar; Vikash Suresh
- Cinematography: E. Krishnasamy
- Edited by: G. Sasikumar
- Music by: Original songs: Jassie Gift; Background Score; Sabesh–Murali
- Production company: Thirrupathi Brothers
- Release date: 27 March 2009
- Country: India
- Language: Tamil

Pattalam (transl. Crew) is a 2009 Indian Tamil-language teen drama film directed by Rohan Krishna. Produced and distributed by Thirrupathi Brothers, the film features an ensemble cast including Nadhiya, Yuthan Balaji, Arun, Hariharan, Irfan, Deepthi Nambiar, and Vikash Suresh. The music was composed by Jassie Gift. The film was released on 27 March 2009.

The film is about a school correspondent and psychiatrist who is very close to eight school-going youngsters who are having a blast enjoying their teenage years without any commitments to burden them.

== Plot ==
Two groups of four adolescents at Holy Bells School are pitted against each other. Their encounters make up the first part.

Daisy is the school correspondent. She is also a psychologist who manages a mental asylum. She believes that students can be disciplined only through love, and no hard punishments will reform them. At first, two groups of rival students are always seen fighting. At an athletic competition, they finish last due to their enmity. At this time, a former professor of the school who was dismissed due to his harsh punishments taunts Daisy, saying only harsh punishments and scolding can discipline students. Seeing the taunts that Daisy is hearing, the two rivals join to make Daisy and the school proud of them.

Meanwhile, Sakkarai is secretly in love with Sophia, who is new to their school. She stays with him in Daisy's asylum. Meanwhile, Karthi, one of the members of the rival gang, loses his father, and then his mother deserts him. He too joins Sakkarai and Sophia in the asylum. Karthi sees his dead sister in Sophia, and so he is very friendly with her. Thinking that Karthi and Sophia are in love with each other, Sakkarai plans to kill Karthi by making a church bell fall on him. However, after realizing the truth, Sakkarai rushes to save Karthi, but his friend Jerry comes under the bell and dies. The incident makes Sakkarai mentally unfit. The film ends with Sakkarai hallucinating Jerry's presence.

== Cast ==
- Nadhiya as Daisy
- Yuthan Balaji as Jerry
- Arun as Sakkarai
- Hariharan as Jagan
- Irfan as Karthi
- Deepthi Nambiar as Sophia
- Vikash Suresh as Nuttu
- Sathya as Guru
- Guru as Jilakhi
- Vignesh as Jilakhi's brother
- Pandu as Jilakhi's father

== Production ==
Pattalam is the second film produced by Thirrupathi Brothers. Initially, the film had a father character in the lead. Jayaram was supposed to do the character but could not allocate dates; N. Subash Chandrabose suggested that the character be changed to a female teacher, and Nadhiya was cast. Nadhiya's voice was dubbed by Rohini.

== Soundtrack ==
The songs were composed by Jassie Gift. The audio launch was held on 3 December 2008 at Sathyam Cinemas, Chennai.

Track listing
| No. | Title | Lyrics | Singer(s) | Length |
|---|---|---|---|---|
| 1. | "Disaiyettum" | Yugabharathi | Jassie Gift, Najeem |
| 2. | "Ennil Nooru Maatram" | Yugabharathi | Shalini Singh, Ranjith |
| 3. | "Panivizhum Kaalama" | Na. Muthukumar | Hesham, Sayanora, William Issac, Sajin |
| 4. | "Engo Piranthom" | Yugabharathi | Arun Gopan, Shanmon, Thushara, Anu Praveen |
| 5. | "Oru Naal" | Yugabharathi | Arun Gopan, Shamon, Thushara |
| 6. | "Iskabararara" | Nellai Bharathy | Diyarohan, Jassie Gift |

== Reception ==
Pavithra Srinivasan from Rediff.com wrote that "Pattalam does give you a brief, 'in the school' feeling; pity that it's so short-lived". A critic from Sify wrote that "Debutant director Rohan Krishna's back to school Pattalam with tag line 'relieve your school memories', is a clean movie that follows the classic Paneer Pushpangal format". Bhama Devi Ravi from The Times of India wrote that "This one is for the younger generation and is typical Kollywood fare". A critic from Chennai Online wrote that "The movie could have been a more enjoyable fare had Rohan avoided the cliches". Malathi Rangarajan of The Hindu wrote, "It needs guts to make a neat film for teenagers with a female protagonist, and no romantic overtures thrust in. [Pattalam] has weaknesses but its strengths make an impression".
