= Ratchagan =

- Theatrical release poster
- Directed by: Praveen Gandhi
- Screenplay by: Praveen Gandhi
- Story by: K. T. Kunjumon
- Produced by: K. T. Kunjumon; Francis Joseph
- Starring: Nagarjuna; Sushmita Sen
- Cinematography: Ajayan Vincent
- Edited by: B. Lenin; V. T. Vijayan
- Music by: A. R. Rahman
- Production company: Gentleman Film International
- Distributed by: A. R. S. Film International; J. R. S. Combines
- Release date: 30 October 1997
- Running time: 154 minutes
- Country: India
- Language: Tamil
- Budget: ₹15 crore

Ratchagan (transl. Saviour) is a 1997 Indian Tamil-language romantic action film co-written, produced by K. T. Kunjumon and directed by Praveen Gandhi in his directoral debut. The music and background score is composed by A. R. Rahman. It stars Nagarjuna and Sushmita Sen in their lead Tamil debuts, alongside Raghuvaran, S. P. Balasubrahmanyam, Vadivelu and Girish Karnad in supporting roles. The film was released on 30 October 1997. It was the most expensive Indian film at the time of release. Notably, this is the only Tamil film to have Sen in a lead role.

== Plot ==
Ajay is an unemployed youth who always gets into trouble because of his temper. He gets enraged when he encounters anyone committing a crime; he takes the law into his own hands, beats them up and then gives them unsolicited advice. Ajay's father Padmanabhan, who works for an insurance firm, is very unhappy with his son's attitude, and tries his best to change his behaviour through a meditation expert, but fails in this matter as the expert suggests that Ajay's anguish is reasonable. Ajay meets Sonia Sriram through his father, and she falls in love with him. What Sonia likes about Ajay is his temper and anger when he encounters anything, which is against the law. Sonia gets Padmanabhan's help to get Ajay to love her. Still, Ajay is not interested in her and rejects her at first; but he later changes his mind after going through some unusual situations, and love blossoms between them.

Sonia's father, Sriram, is an industrialist who owns the DCM-Daewoo automotive manufacturing facility in Chennai. He has no objection to his daughter's relationship with Ajay, but has one condition: Ajay must become employed in his factory, control his temper for three months, and not get into any fight whatsoever, even if he encounters a crime happening in front of his eyes. If Ajay cannot do this, he will not be allowed to marry Sonia. With a heavy heart, Ajay agrees to the conditions; Sonia's love for Ajay deepens, and Sriram offers Ajay a job in his factory. Sriram actually has his own problems with his factory in a loss; ten of his workers are working with his rival and younger stepbrother Gnaneswar, and they hamper the progress of his factory with frequent, pre-planned mishaps. This leads to the factory's property loss.

Gnaneswar is the son of Sriram's stepmother, who gets deceived by Sriram and loses his share of his father's business empire. Further, in unusual circumstances, Gnaneswar spends some years in jail and returns with a planned conspiracy and vengeance on his stepbrother, Sriram. Gnaneswar is now trying to put Sriram out of business, so his ten men create havoc in the factory by killing old workers and raging new workers. So, when Ajay comes to work in Sriram's factory, these ten men do the same to Ajay. Ajay keeps cool, trying to keep his promise to Sriram. But Sriram hopes otherwise; he wants Ajay to break the promise and beat up the ten men and throw them out of the factory. At the same time, Sriram hopes the imminent marriage between Ajay and Sonia will be cancelled, since he does not want his daughter to marry an angry street-fighter like Ajay. So, Sriram keeps hoping Ajay will somehow burst out. Gnaneswar's men damage an important machine to make the international Korean experts attend the problem. The plan is to kill those Korean experts so that it would become an international issue and Sriram's company would be locked permanently, but Ajay saves those experts, and Sriram publicises this to create a fight between Gnaneswar's men and Ajay, but it happens otherwise that Ajay still keeps cool in spite of them beating him black and blue, and Sriram's hopes are dashed. As the last trigger, Sriram uses his father's name in publicising the issue in the factory to media so that Gnaneswar's men may think that it was Ajay's father who brought this to the media. As expected by Sriram, those ten men brutally murder Ajay's father for this.

After this, Ajay becomes furious and breaks his promise and banishes the ten men from the factory. But Gnaneswar holds Ajay and blackmails Sonia that he would kill Ajay unless Sonia kills herself by destroying Sriram's factory by bombarding it with a truck armed with a powerful Russian explosives. In the climax, Gnaneswar kills Sriram by throwing him off the helicopter; Gnaneswar gets killed when his helicopter hits the mountains; and Sonia gets saved and unites with Ajay.

== Cast ==
- Nagarjuna as Ajay Padmanabhan (Voice-Over by actor Suresh)
- Sushmita Sen as Sonia Devi Sriram (Voice-Over by actress Saritha)
- S. P. Balasubrahmanyam as Padmanabhan
- Raghuvaran as Gnaneswar
- Girish Karnad as Sriram (Voice-Over by Kitty)
- Vadivelu as Dhanapal, Ajay's friend
- Sukumari as Sonia's grandmother
- Kavitha as Sonia's mother
- Subhalekha Sudhakar as Sathish Varma, the company manager
- Kevin Erik Gray as Kevin, the sales officer (one of the ten men)
- Ajay Rathnam as Mithran, the performance engineer (one of the ten men)
- Thalapathy Dinesh as Sopraj (one of the ten men)
- Mahanadi Shankar as Surla, the chemical expert (one of the ten men)
- Daljith Singh as Singh, the weapon designer (one of the ten men)
- Abu Salim as Abu Salim (one of the ten men)
- Sanjay as Sanjay (one of the ten men)
- Joseph as Joseph (one of the ten men)
- Mithran as Rishi (one of the ten men)
- Luka Varghese as Malik (one of the ten men)
- Chinni Jayanth as a police constable
- Manobala as Kanniyappan
- Dr. Rudhran as a psychiatrist doctor
- Karikalan as a police officer
- Vijay Krishnaraj as a police officer
- R. N. Sudarshan as Gnaneshwar's father
- Vinodhini as Priya
- Madhan Bob as Priya's husband
- Gopal Aravind as Aravind
- Omakuchi Narasimhan
- Gundu Kalyanam
- Manager Cheena as MRF Santhakumar
- Soundar as a dog owner
- Joker Thulasi as a dog owner
- Kavithalaya Krishnan as an auto driver
- Mohan Raman as Junior Vikatan editor
- Alphonsa in a special appearance
- Sridhar as dancer in "Soniya Soniya"

== Production ==
The film was launched in January 1996, but filming only commenced the following year, in January 1997. Despite signing on an established crew including A. R. Rahman along with Miss Universe pageant winner Sushmita Sen and Nagarjuna an established star from Telugu cinema, producer Kunjumon signed Praveen Gandhi to be make his directorial debut. Kunjumon revealed that in the direction, he saw "a young man who is very talented and full of ideas who was willing to work hard". Praveen Gandhi said he narrated the script to various actors including Arvind Swamy, Prabhu Deva and Mohanlal before finalising Nagarjuna. It is the Tamil debut of Sen. The dialogues were written by Crazy Mohan. The period in between was spent with pre-production works with art director Thota Tharani constructing a huge set in Mahabalipuram with an elaborate bungalow and swimming pool as a part of the heroine's home, as well as a huge five star hotel where the villains lived and a landing area for helicopters. The climax was filmed at Chengalpet Highway at Chennai. To shoot the helicopter scene, another helicopter with the cameraman flew above the helicopter with the villain in it. Tharani created eight sets for the song "Love Attack", with Nagarjuna and Sen dancing alongside 50 other dancers. The song "Mercury Pookkal Model Nilakkal" was picturised in the midst of many small aeroplanes in Bangalore. The film was shot all over India, including locations in Manali, Mumbai, Goa, Ooty, Rajasthan and Delhi, with Kunjumon making a claim during filming stages that the film would become India's most costly production to that point. Nagarjuna's voice was dubbed by actor Suresh.

== Soundtrack ==
The soundtrack featured eight songs and a theme song composed by A. R. Rahman. T-Series bought the music rights of the film in 1997.

Ratchagan - (Tamil)
No.	Title	Lyrics	Singer(s)	Length
1.	"Soniya Soniya"	Vairamuthu	Udit Narayan, P. Unnikrishnan, Harini	5:35
2.	"Love Attack"	Vaali	Gopal Rao, Kavita Paudwal	5:01
3.	"Chandiranai Thottathu Yaar"	Vairamuthu	Hariharan, Sujatha Mohan	6:46
4.	"Kanava Illai Kaatra"	Vairamuthu	Srinivas	4:34
5.	"Lucky Lucky"	Vairamuthu	S. P. Balasubrahmanyam, Sukhwinder Singh, Swarnalatha, Ravi Koti	6:06
6.	"Nenje Nenje"	Vairamuthu	K. J. Yesudas, Sadhana Sargam	6:56
7.	"Pogum Vazhiyellam"	Vairamuthu	K. S. Chitra	4:13
8.	"Mercury Pookkal"	Vaali	Anupama, Swarnalatha	5:23
9.	"Theme Music" (Instrumental)	-	-	3:42
Total length:				48:16

All lyrics are written by Bhuvana Chandra.

Rakshakudu - (Telugu)
No.	Title	Singer(s)	Length
1.	"Soniya Soniya"	Udit Narayan, P. Unnikrishnan, Harini	5:35
2.	"Love Attack"	S. P. Balasubrahmanyam, Kavita Paudwal	5:01
3.	"Chandruni Takinadi"	Hariharan, Sujatha Mohan	6:46
4.	"Kalava Kanne Kalava"	Rangan	4:34
5.	"Lucky Lucky"	S. P. Balasubrahmanyam, Sukhwinder Singh, Swarnalatha	6:06
6.	"Ninne Ninne"	K. J. Yesudas, Sadhana Sargam	6:56
7.	"Preme na Gamyamanna"	Sangeetha Sajith	4:13
8.	"Mercury Poollu"	Anupama, Swarnalatha	5:23
9.	"Theme Music"	Instrumental	3:42
Total length:			48:16

== Release and reception ==
Ratchagan was initially slated to be released on 31 July 1997, but the FEFSI strike of 1997 delayed such plans. The film was released in Tamil Nadu, along with the Telugu dubbed version Rakshakudu in Andhra Pradesh on 30 October 1997. K. N. Vijiyan of New Straits Times criticised Praveen Gandhi's direction, Ajay Vincent's cinematography and the story by Kunjumon for having many plot holes. Ji of Kalki praised the music and cinematography but felt apprehension that those who have spent a lot on grandeur should have spent a little brain on the story. The film did not do well at the box office. Raghuvaran won the Dinakaran Cinema Award for Best Villain.
