= Pravin Gandhi =

Indian film director, and actor

- Born: Praveenkanth; 10 February 1974 (age 52); Chennai, India
- Occupations: Film director, actor
- Years active: 1996–2014, 2025

Pravin Gandhi (also credited as Praveenkanth or Praveen Gandhi) is an Indian film director, and actor known for his works in Tamil cinema.

== Career ==
Pravin Gandhi entered the industry with the aim to become an actor. Since he lacked the background, he worked as the co-director for Priyadarshan. He was first given the opportunity to become a film maker by producer K. T. Kunjumon with Ratchagan (1997), who noted that in the director he saw "a young man who is very talented and full of ideas who was willing to work hard". The film was launched in January 1996 but filming only commenced the following year in January 1997, with an established cast and crew including Telugu actor Nagarjuna, Miss Universe pageant winner Sushmita Sen, Girish Karnad and A. R. Rahman. The film was shot all over India including locations in Manali, Mumbai, Goa, Ooty, Rajasthan and Delhi, with Kunjumon making a claim during filming stages that the film would become India's most costly production.

Pravin Gandhi returned in 1999 with the romantic film, Jodi, featuring Prashanth and Simran. He released the film under the name Praveenkanth, his original name, after being known as Praveen Gandhi in his first venture. The director also played a cameo role in the film portraying an eloping youngster who assists Prashanth. The film opened to positive reviews and became a box office success, with a reviewer noting "the director's light-veined screenplay keeps the movie moving at a good pace".

In 2000, Pravin Gandhi considered making a film titled Apoorvan with Ajith Kumar and Aishwarya Rai starring, but the project did not materialise. Jodi's success prompted director to collaborate with Prashanth and Simran again in a project called Star (2001), but Simran soon dropped out and the film failed to replicate the success of Jodi. Portraying a full length supporting role, Praveen Gandhi won negative reviews for his acting and direction with a critic noting it was a "ruinously shoddy script" and "the director’s attempt to enter into the acting arena, and play one of the crucial characters in the film adds insult to injury". Another reviewer described that "the messy screenplay in the second half ruins the story that admittedly has enough potential for romance, laughs, sentiments and action".

In 2003, he began working on a film titled Thullal, in which he would play the central character and despite being launched amidst much fanfare, its theatrical release saw a delay. The film eventually opened in July 2007 to unanimously poor reviews, with a critic labelling the film as "torture", adding that the director has a "misplaced sense of self importance in his very first film as a hero". Despite the failure of the film, he announced two further acting ventures Muktha then Vilasam TN 03 6999, though neither film were completed or released. Another directorial venture planned in 2009, Adayalam with Ragini, also failed to materialize.

== Filmography ==
Year	Title	Credited as		Notes
Year	Title	Director	Actor	Notes
1997	Ratchagan	Yes	No	
1999	Jodi	Yes	Yes	credited as Praveenkanth
2001	Star	Yes	Yes	credited as Praveenkanth
2007	Thullal	Yes	Yes	credited as Praveenkanth
2014	Pulipaarvai	Yes	No	Also editor, composer, art director, lyricist

== Television ==
Year	Programme / Show	Role	Language	Channel	Notes
2025	Bigg Boss season 9	Contestant	Tamil	Star Vijay	Evicted
