= Manoj Kumar (Tamil director) =

Indian film director, producer and TV actor

- Born: Manoharan; 23 September 1955 (age 70); Theni, Tamil Nadu, India
- Occupations: Film director, producer, actor
- Years active: 1986–present
- Relatives: Bharathiraja
- Website: Official website

Manoj Kumar (born 23 September 1955) is an Indian film director, producer and actor who has directed Tamil, Telugu and Kannada films and Tamil serials. He is the brother-in-law of Bharathiraja.

== Career ==
After assisting Bharathiraja in various films, he made his directorial debut with Mannukkul Vairam (1986). He directed several films in 1990s such as, Guru Paarvai (1998) starring Prakash Raj, won positive reviews. He attempted to collaborate again with Prakash Raj and Prabhu in a film titled Vasantha Kaalam, but the project was stalled. He then went on to make medium budget action films including Vaanavil (2000) and Jaisurya (2004) featuring Arjun, as well as Raajjiyam (2002) which had Vijayakanth, Dileep and Shamita Shetty in the lead cast, with the latter two made their Tamil debut by this film.

He ventured into production in the mid-2000s and made the Madhavan - starrer Arya, before launching a directorial project titled Utharavu with Seeman, which eventually did not progress. Manoj Kumar resurfaced in 2013, when it was revealed that he was working with producer Kovai Thambi on a venture titled Uyirukku Uyiraga. The script of the film was reported to be about the relationship between parents and their grown-up children, while the cast was composed of newcomers.

He is also into acting both in Tamil cinema and Tamil serials as character artist most notably in Thirumanam (TV series) from Colours (TV channel) Tamil. He also appears in a negative role in Rasathi serial from Sun TV (India).

== Filmography ==
=== As director ===
Films

Year	Film
1986	Mannukkul Vairam
1987	Neram Nalla Irukku
1990	Pachai Kodi
1990	Maruthu Pandi
1990	Vellaiya Thevan
1992	Pandithurai
1992	Samundi
1993	Maravan
1994	Vandicholai Chinraasu
1994	Senthamizh Selvan
1994	Rajapandi
1998	Guru Paarvai
2000	Vaanavil
2002	Raajjiyam
2004	Jaisurya
2014	Uyirukku Uyiraga

Serials

Year	Title	Channel
	Ration Card (Also scriptwriter)	Jaya TV

=== As producer ===
- I Love You Daa (2003)
- Arya (2007)

=== As actor ===
Films

Year	Film
2013	Kedi Billa Killadi Ranga
2013	Annakodi
2015	Paayum Puli
2015	Pasanga 2
2017	Enga Amma Rani
2018	Padaiveeran
2018	Kadaikutty Singam
2021	Namma Oorukku Ennadhan Achu
2021	Annaatthe
2024	Pogumidam Vegu Thooramillai
TBA	Vanangamudi

Serials

Year	Title	Channel
2014	10 Mani Kathaigal	Sun TV
2018–2020	Thirumanam	Colors Tamil
2019	Rasaathi	Sun TV
2020	Bharathi Kannamma	Star Vijay
2020	Kannana Kanne	Sun TV
2020–2024	Vanathai Pola	Sun TV
2023	Amudhavum Annalakshmiyum	Zee Tamil
2024	Mounam Pesiyadhe	Zee Tamil
2025–Present	Poongodi	Sun TV
2025	Magale En Marumagale	Star Vijay
