= List of Tamil films of 2006 =

This is a list of Tamil language films released in India during 2006.

== Box office collection ==
The following is the list of highest-grossing Tamil cinema films released in 2006.

The Highest Worldwide Gross of 2006
Rank	Title	Production company	Worldwide gross
1	Varalaru	NIC Arts	₹50−55 crore
2	Vettaiyaadu Vilaiyaadu	Seventh Channel Communications	₹45−50 crore
3	Sillunu Oru Kaadhal	Studio Green	₹35 crore
4	Thimiru	GK Film Corporation	₹30 crore
5	Unakkum Enakkum	Sri Lakshmi Productions; Jayam Company	₹25 crore
6	Vallavan	Sri Raj Lakshmi Films	₹23 crore
7	Thiruvilaiyaadal Aarambam	R. K. Productions	₹20 crore
8	Imsai Arasan 23rd Pulikecei	S Pictures	₹15 crore
9	Thirupathi	AVM Productions	₹13−14 crore
10	Aathi	V. V. Creations	₹11−12 crore

== Released films ==
=== January — March ===
Opening		Title	Director	Cast	Studio	Ref
J A N	14	Paramasivan	P. Vasu	Ajith Kumar, Laila, Jayaram		
J A N	14	Saravana	K. S. Ravikumar	Silambarasan, Jyothika, Prakash Raj		
J A N	15	Aathi	Ramana	Vijay, Trisha		
J A N	15	Pasa Kiligal	Amirtham	Prabhu, Murali, Vineeth, Navya Nair, Malavika, Roja, Vadivelu		
F E B	2	Dishyum	Sasi	Jiiva, Sandhya		
F E B	10	Amirtham	K. Kannan	Ganesh, Navya Nair		
F E B	10	Chithiram Pesuthadi	Mysskin	Narain, Bhavana		
F E B	10	Idhaya Thirudan	Saran	Jayam Ravi, Kamna Jethmalani, Prakash Raj		
F E B	10	June R	Revathy S. Varma	Jyothika, Khushbu, Saritha		
F E B	10	Kodambakkam	K. P. Jagan	Nandha, Diya, Tejashree		
F E B	17	Kalabha Kadhalan	Igore	Arya, Renuka Menon, Akshaya		
F E B	17	Kalvanin Kadhali	Thamilvaanan	S. J. Surya, Nayantara		
F E B	17	Madrasi	Arjun	Arjun, Vedhika		
F E B	17	Nagareega Komali	Ramji S. Balan	Bala Joseph, Neetha Sree		
F E B	22	Thambi	Seeman	R. Madhavan, Pooja		
F E B	24	Kovai Brothers	Sakthi Chidambaram	Sathyaraj, Sibiraj, Namitha, Uma, Vadivelu		
M A R	10	Oru Kadhal Seiveer	Ravi Bhargavan	Santhosh, Archana Galrani, Krishna		
M A R	10	Sudesi	A. Y. Jeppy	Vijayakanth, Ashima Bhalla		
M A R	17	Mercury Pookkal	S. S. Stanley	Srikanth, Meera Jasmine		
M A R	17	Pattiyal	Vishnuvardhan	Arya, Bharath, Pooja, Padmapriya		
M A R	24	Unarchigal	K. Rajan	Sriman, Abitha, Abhinayashree		

=== April — June ===
Opening		Title	Director	Cast	Studio	Ref
A P R	7	Theenda Theenda	A. P. Muhan	Shivhasan, Vinod, Preethi Varma, Shravya		
A P R	14	Azhagai Irukkirai Bayamai Irukkirathu	Vijay Milton	Bharath, Mallika Kapoor, Arun Vijay		
A P R	14	Pachchak Kuthira	Parthiban	Parthiban, Namitha		
A P R	14	Thirupathi	Perarasu	Ajith Kumar, Sadha		
A P R	14	Thiruttu Payale	Susi Ganesan	Jeevan, Sonia Agarwal, Malavika, Abbas		
M A Y	5	Suyetchai MLA	Guru Dhanapal	Sathyaraj, Goundamani, Mantra, Abitha		
M A Y	12	Kokki	Prabu Solomon	Karan, Pooja Gandhi		
M A Y	12	Madhu	K. Thennarasu	Githan Ramesh, Priyamani		
M A Y	19	Jerry	S. B. Khanthan	Githan Ramesh, Shruthi Raj, Mumtaj, Meera Vasudevan		
M A Y	19	Thalai Nagaram	Suraj	Sundar C, Jyothirmayi, Vadivelu		
M A Y	26	Kalinga	Ram Prabha	Bala, Nandhana		
M A Y	26	Pudhupettai	Selvaraghavan	Dhanush, Sneha, Sonia Agarwal		
J U N	2	Don Chera	K. S. Saravanan	Ranjith, Sujibala		
J U N	9	Parijatham	K. Bhagyaraj	Prithviraj, Saranya Bhagyaraj		
J U N	15	Kaivantha Kalai	Pandiarajan	Prithvi Rajan, Shruthi, Pandiarajan, Malavika		
J U N	16	Naalai	Uday Mahesh	Richard Rishi, Natty Subramaniam, Madhumitha		
J U N	23	Aacharya	Ravi	Vignesh, Divya, Nassar		
J U N	23	Kusthi	Raj Kapoor	Prabhu, Karthik, Manya, Flora, Vadivelu		
J U N	30	Uyir	Samy	Srikanth, Sangeetha, Samvrutha Sunil		

=== July — September ===
Opening		f Title	Director	Cast	Studio	Ref
J U L	6	Thullura Vayasu	Gopal	Raghava, Deepika		
J U L	8	Imsai Arasan 23rd Pulikecei	Chimbu Deven	Vadivelu, Monika, Tejashree		
J U L	14	Thodamale	V. Rajendra Kumar	Narain, Uma		
J U L	14	Thoothukudi	Harikumar	Harikumar, Karthika		
J U L	14	Yuga	Yaar Kannan	Richard, Swarnamalya, Manikandan, Santhoshi		
J U L	21	47A Besant Nagar Varai	Goutham Krishna	Abbas, Sangeetha, Ravali	Raja & Raju Associates	
J U L	27	Boys and Girls	V. Rajagopal	Arjun Singh, Shyla Lopez	All Light Productions	
J U L	27	Sasanam	Mahendran	Arvind Swamy, Gautami, Ranjitha		
J U L	27	Unakkum Enakkum	Mohan Raja	Jayam Ravi, Trisha, Prabhu, Richa Pallod		
A U G	4	Kadhale En Kadhale	PC Shekhar	Naveen, Shrutha Keerthi, Roma Asrani		
A U G	4	Thimiru	Tarun Gopi	Vishal, Reemma Sen, Sriya Reddy		
A U G	4	Vanjagan	A. M. Bhaskar	Sujibala, Prathap, Suman		
A U G	11	Kurukshetram	Jayabharathi	Sathyaraj, Roja		
A U G	17	Nee Venunda Chellam	L. Venkatesan	Githan Ramesh, Gajala, Namitha		
A U G	25	Vettaiyaadu Vilaiyaadu	Gautham Vasudev Menon	Kamal Haasan, Jyothika, Kamalinee Mukherjee, Prakash Raj		
S E P	1	16 Naatkal	Ravi Srinivas	R. S. K. G, Ananthy, Ganaa Ulakanathan		
S E P	7	Em Magan	Thirumurugan	Bharath, Gopika, Nassar, Saranya Ponvannan, Vadivelu		
S E P	8	Jambhavan	Nandhakumar	Prashanth, Nila, Meghna Naidu		
S E P	8	Sillunu Oru Kaadhal	N. Krishna	Suriya, Jyothika, Bhumika Chawla		
S E P	14	Perarasu	Udhayan	Vijayakanth, Debina Bonnerjee		
S E P	22	Manathodu Mazhaikalam	Arputhan	Shaam, Samiksha, Nithya Das, Jayasurya		
S E P	24	Kedi	Jyothi Krishna	Ravi Krishna, Ileana D'Cruz, Tamannaah		

=== October — December ===
Opening		Title	Director	Cast	Studio	Ref
O C T	6	Sengathu	Indhu Nathan	Nishanth, Payal, Ilavarasu	TKM Films	
O C T	13	Maranthen Meimaranthen	Sivaraman	Yohaa, Poornitha	Foot Steps Production	
O C T	20	Dharmapuri	Perarasu	Vijayakanth, Lakshmi Rai, Manivannan	Sri Surya Movies	
O C T	20	E	S. P. Jananathan	Jiiva, Nayanthara, Pasupathy, Ashish Vidyarthi	Super Good Films	
O C T	20	Varalaru	K. S. Ravikumar	Ajith Kumar, Asin, Kanika	NIC Arts	
O C T	21	Thalaimagan	Sarath Kumar	Sarathkumar, Nayanthara, Mukesh Tiwari	Radaan Mediaworks	
O C T	21	Vallavan	Silambarasan	Silambarasan, Nayanthara, Reemma Sen, Sandhya	Sri Raj Lakshmi Films	
O C T	21	Vattaram	Saran	Arya, Kirat Bhattal, Napoleon	Gemini Productions	
N O V	10	Kizhakku Kadarkarai Salai	S. S. Stanley	Srikanth, Bhavana, Suresh	Ven Thiraikkalam	
N O V	10	Vathiyar	A. Venkatesh	Arjun, Mallika Kapoor, Prakash Raj	AP Film Garden	
N O V	17	Aavani Thingal	Harikrishna	Subramanian Gopalakrishnan, Tejini, Mathisha	Rayar Films International	
N O V	17	Desiya Paravai	Babu Ganesh	Suresh, Urvashi, Babu Ganesh, Vadivelu	S Sen International	
N O V	17	Prathi Gnayiru 9 Manimudhal 10.30 Varai	M. Anbu	Ramesh, Poornitha, Karunas	Vision 21	
N O V	24	Rendu	Sundar C	R. Madhavan, Reemma Sen, Anushka Shetty	Avni Cinemax	
N O V	24	Sivappathigaram	Karu Pazhaniappan	Vishal, Mamta Mohandas, Raghuvaran	Screen Play Entertainment	
N O V	30	Iruvar Mattum	Dwaraki Raghavan	Abhay, Sunitha Varma	V R Miracle Movies	
D E C	1	Idhu Kadhal Varum Paruvam	Kasthuri Raja	Harish Kumar, Kiran, Lakshmi Priya	R K Productions	
D E C	1	Mann	Pudhiyavan	Vijith, Shana Mahendran, Chandrasekhar	Cine Range Films	
D E C	1	Nenjil	Selva	Navdeep, Aparna Pillai, Ranjitha	Karpagam Entertainment	
D E C	8	Chennai Kadhal	Vikraman	Bharath, Genelia D'Souza, Radharavi	V Creations	
D E C	15	Aadu Puli Aattam	Sanjay Ram	Mani Prakash, Vennila, Rekha Sri	Opa Creations	
D E C	15	Ganapathy Vanthachi	P. C. Guna	Udhai, Rajesh, Mathisha	Prime Movie Makers	
D E C	15	Nenjirukkum Varai	S. A. Chandrasekhar	Narain, Poonam Kaur, Thalaivasal Vijay	Baba Films	
D E C	15	Thiruvilaiyaadal Aarambam	Boopathy Pandian	Dhanush, Shriya Saran, Prakash Raj	Karthick Cine Vision	
D E C	17	Veyil	Vasanthabalan	Pasupathy, Bharath, Bhavana, Sriya Reddy, Priyanka Nair	S Pictures	
D E C	22	Azhagiya Asura	Nagu	Yogi, Regina, Nanditha Jennifer	Jeyram Creations	
D E C	22	Ilakkanam	Chandraseyan	Vishnu Priyan, Uma, Vinu Chakravarthy	Nanneri Padaippagam	
D E C	22	Poi	K. Balachander	Uday Kiran, Vimala Raman, Geethu Mohandas	Duet Movies	
D E C	22	Thirudi	K. Shankar	Kathir, Dhanya, Rajeev	GV Films	
D E C	28	Mazhaithuli Mazhaithuli	K. G. Gurushankar	K. G. Gurushankar, Raveena, Reshmi	Lights On Films	
D E C	28	Thagapansamy	Shiva Shanmugam	Prashanth, Pooja, Namitha	Thirumalai Creations	
D E C	29	Adaikalam	Bhuvanaraja	Prashanth, Uma, Thyagarajan	Kaladass Creations	
D E C	29	Kasu	Gowri Manohar	Rahman, Sangeetha, Rajashree	Palavodai Amman Creations	

Other

The following films were also released in 2006, though their release dates remain unknown.

Title	Director	Cast	Studio	Ref
Aattam	V. K. Iyanar	Sharuk, Saritha Dass, Sabitha Anand	Kandha Lakshmi Creations	
December 26	R. Manivasakan	Nikil, Payal	Lucky Movie Media	
Enga Veettu Ponu	L. Ragunath	Saravana Kumar, Balaji Kanna, Rubiga	Vaishali Cini Combines	
Jayanth	Karthik Kumar	Livingston, Preethi Varma	Anis Creations	
Kadhalum Katrumara	Suriya Selvan	Udhaya, Vihasini, Livingston	Shree Draupadhi Amman Films	
Laya	V. Rishiraj	V. Rishiraj, Ganesh, Karishma, Bharathi	Roshan Film International	
Manasukkulea	Sriguru	Abhay, Akshaya Rao, Senthil	Ajmir Film Combines	

== Awards ==
Category/organization	Filmfare Awards South 4 August 2007	Tamil Nadu State Film Awards 6 September 2007
Best Film	Veyil	Veyil
Best Director	Vasanthabalan; Veyil	Thirumurugan; Em Magan
Best Actor	Ajith Kumar; Varalaru	Kamal Haasan • Vettaiyaadu Vilaiyaadu; Bharath Srinivasan Em Magan
Best Actress	Bhavana; Veyyil	Trisha; Aathi; Gopika Em Magan (2006)
Best Music Director	A. R. Rahman; Sillunu Oru Kaadhal	Yuvan Shankar Raja; Pattiyal
