= Sai Dhanshika =

Indian actress (born 1989)

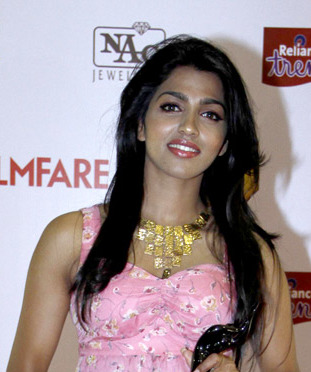
- Sai Dhansika in 2014
- Born: Sai Dhanshika; 20 November 1989 (age 36); Thanjavur, Tamil Nadu, India
- Occupation: Actress
- Years active: 2006 – present
- Partner: Vishal (2025–present)

Sai Dhanshika (born 20 November 1989) is an Indian actress who predominantly appears in Tamil cinema, alongside roles in Kannada and Telugu films. She gained recognition for her performances in Peraanmai (2009) and Aravaan (2012). Her portrayal of Vanapechi in the period drama Paradesi (2013) earned her the Filmfare Award South for Best Supporting Actress, and she won the same award for her role as Yogi in the Rajinikanth-starrer Kabali (2016).

== Early life ==
Dhanshika was born on 20 November 1989 in the Thanjavur district into a Tamil family. Dhanshika's mother is a Hindu and her father a Christian. Dhanshika stated in an interview that her father worked as an AC mechanic supervisor in Kuwait while she was young and that her mother was a housewife. Dhanshika is the eldest of three daughters. Dhanshika credits her uncle with helping bring her into the industry.

== Career ==
She stepped into the industry with Manathodu Mazhaikalam in 2006, where she was credited as Marina. The film, directed by the late Arputhan featured her alongside Shaam, Nithya Das, and Malayalam actor Jayasurya in a coming-of-age drama. After her debut, she appeared in films such as Maranthen Meimaranthen and Thirudi. She also ventured into Kannada cinema with Kempa where she was credited as Thanushika.

She starred in several Tamils films including Peraanmai (2009), Maanja Velu (2010) and Nil Gavani Sellathey (2010). Regarding her role in Nil Gavani Sellathey, a reviewer stated that "Among the relatively fresh cast, only Dhansika (Maanja Velu, Peraanmai) makes an impression". She starred as the heroine in Aravaan (2012) and Paradesi. She garnered acclaim for her performance in the latter with a critic noting that "Dhansikaa is as good as ever". Her next film Ya Ya released to negative reviews. Thiranthidu Seese (2015) released to positive reviews with a critic stating that "A ravishing Dhanshika plays Charmi with elan". She also garnered recognition for her portrayal of Rajinikanth's daughter in Kabali (2016) with a critic noting that "Watching Yogi (Dhansikaa) is a delight, given her stylish makeover and ease in fight sequence". For her role in the film, she sported a short hair cut. Her next film Enga Amma Rani (2017), which was set in Malaysia, released to positive reviews with a critic stating that "Sai Dhanshika is pretty much the highlight here: tough, determined, and also vulnerable to grief when the situation demands". Her performance was praised in her subsequent films Uru and Solo. Vizhithiru, Kaathadi, and Kaalakkoothu released to negative reviews.

Her Kannada debut Udgharsha (2019) released to positive reviews. Her next film Iruttu released to mixed and positive reviews. She was cast in Laabam (2021) in a negative role. She has also been cast in Yogi Da (2026).

== Personal life ==
On August 29, 2025, Tamil actors Vishal and Sai Dhanshika officially announced their engagement in a private ceremony held at Vishal's residence in Anna Nagar, Chennai, which coincided with Vishal's 48th birthday. The couple's relationship began as a friendship 15 years ago.

== Filmography ==
Key
†	Denotes films that have not yet been released

Year	Film	Role	Language	Note
2006	Manathodu Mazhaikalam	Marina	Tamil	Credited as Marina
2006	Maranthen Meimaranthen	Lalli	Tamil	Credited as Marina
2006	Thirudi	Poongavanam	Tamil	Credited as Marina
2009	Kempa	Bindhu	Kannada	Credited as Thanushika; Kannada Debut
2009	Peraanmai	Jennifer	Tamil	
2010	Maanja Velu	Anjali	Tamil	
2010	Nil Gavani Sellathey	Jo	Tamil	
2012	Aravaan	Vanapechi	Tamil	
2013	Paradesi	Maragadham	Tamil	
2013	Ya Ya	Seetha	Tamil	
2015	Thiranthidu Seese	Charmi	Tamil	
2016	Kabali	Yogitha Kabaleeswaran (Yogi)	Tamil	
2017	Enga Amma Rani	Thulasi	Tamil	
2017	Uru	Jene/Nisha	Tamil	
2017	Solo	Radhika	Malayalam; Tamil	Malayalam Debut; Simultaneously shot in Tamil
2017	Vizhithiru	Saroja Devi	Tamil	
2018	Kaathadi	Unnamed Heroine	Tamil	
2018	Kaala Koothu	Gayathri	Tamil	
2019	Udgharsha	Rashmi	Kannada	
2019	Iruttu	Shikara (Jinn Sila)	Tamil	
2021	Laabam	Vanagamudi's assistant	Tamil	
2022	Shikaaru	Devika	Telugu	Telugu Debut
2024	Anthima Theerpu	Durga	Telugu	
2024	Dhakshina	Dhakshina	Telugu	
2026	Yogi Da	K. Yogeshwari	Tamil	
2026	Magudam	-	Tamil	Co-producer

=== Television ===
Year	Film	Role	Language	Note
2024	Aindham Vedham	Anu Panchamavedhi	Tamil	ZEE5

=== Short films ===
Year	Film	Role	Language	Note
2021	Sinam	Shakthi	Tamil	Short film

== Awards and nominations ==
Year	Award	Category	Film	Result	Ref.
2012	Edison Awards	Most Daring Role	Aravaan	Won	
2013	Vijay Awards	Best Supporting Actress	Paradesi	Won	
2013	Filmfare Awards South	Best Actress In a supporting role-tamil	Paradesi	Won	
2016	Filmfare Awards South	Best Actress In a supporting role-tamil	Kabali	Won	
2019	Ananda Vikatan Cinema Awards	Best Villain - Female	Iruttu	Won	
