= Yogi Da =

2026 Tamil film by Goutham Krishna

- Theatrical release poster
- Directed by: Goutham Krishna
- Written by: Goutham Krishna
- Produced by: V. Senthil Kumar
- Starring: Sai Dhanshika; Kabir Duhan Singh; Sayaji Shinde
- Cinematography: S KA Boopathi
- Edited by: G. Sasikumar
- Music by: Deepak Dev
- Production company: Sri Monica Cine Films
- Release date: 6 February 2026
- Country: India
- Language: Tamil

Yogi Da is a 2026 Indian Tamil-language action comedy film written and directed by debutant Goutham Krishna starring Sai Dhanshika in the lead role alongside Kabir Duhan Singh, Sayaji Shinde and others in important roles. The film is produced by V. Senthil Kumar under his Sri Monica Cine Films banner, has cinematography handled by S KA Boopathi, editing done by G. Sasikumar, and music composed by Deepak Dev. It was released in theatres on 6 February 2026.

== Plot ==
Yogeshwari (“Yogi”), a fearless and upright police officer, is transferred from Coimbatore to Chennai after taking action against influential criminals. In Chennai, she finds herself battling a powerful crime network led by the ruthless gangster Jawahar Babu. As she investigates corruption, drug-related crimes, and political connections, she faces repeated attempts to stop her mission.

The story follows Yogi's fight against corruption and her efforts to bring Jawahar Babu and his associates to justice. The film is structured as a mass-action police drama, featuring numerous fight sequences that showcase Yogi's bravery and combat skills. Ultimately, it centers on her determination to overcome personal and professional obstacles while standing up to powerful criminals.

== Cast ==
- Sai Dhanshika as K. Yogeshwari
- Kabir Duhan Singh as Jawahar Babu
- Sayaji Shinde as Arivazhagan
- Redin Kingsley as Muthu
- Pujita Ponnada as Mallika

== Production ==
After the release of Kaalakkoothu (2018), Sai Dhanshika was announced to collaborate with director Goutham Krishna for her next starring herself in the lead role. The film marks Goutham's debut as the director; he earlier worked as an assistant to Sibi Malayil and Chakri Toleti. Principal photography began on 10 December 2018. Kabir Duhan Singh, who plays an important role, revealed that Dhanshika learned stunts for her role. Produced by V. Senthil Kumar under his Sri Monica Cine Films banner, the film has cinematography handled by S KA Boopathi, editing done by G. Sasikumar, and action choreography by G. Ganesh Kumar. The film's trailer was released by Vishal on 24 May 2025.

== Music ==
The film has music composed by Deepak Dev, marking his return to Tamil after Sadhu Miranda (2008). The pre-release audio launch event took place in mid-May 2025.

== Release and reception ==
Yogi Da released in theatres on 6 February 2026. Akshay Kumar of Cinema Express gave 1.5 out of 5 stars and wrote "With its cloying commitment, Yogi Da reduces women’s equality to caricature, turning the protagonist into a performative symbol rather than a fully lived character." Dinamalar rated the film with 2 out of 5 stars.
