= Kozhi Koovuthu =

Kozhi Koovuthu may refer to:

- Kozhi Koovuthu (1982 film), a 1982 Tamil-language Indian feature film
- Kozhi Koovuthu (2012 film), a 2012 Indian film
