= Uru (2017 film) =

2017 Tamil-language psychological thriller slasher film by Vicky Anand

- Theatrical release poster
- Directed by: Vicky Anand
- Written by: Vicky Anand
- Produced by: V. P. Viji
- Starring: Kalaiyarasan; Dhansika; Mime Gopi
- Cinematography: Prasanna Kumar
- Edited by: San Lokesh
- Music by: Johan Shevanesh
- Production company: Vaiyam Mediyas
- Release date: 16 June 2017
- Country: India
- Language: Tamil

Uru (transl. Fear) is a 2017 Tamil-language psychological thriller slasher film written and directed by Vicky Anand and produced by V.P. Viji. The film stars Kalaiyarasan, Dhansika, and Mime Gopi. The soundtrack was composed by Johan Shevanesh with cinematography by Prasanna S. Kumar and editing by San Lokesh. It is inspired by the American films The Shining, Secret Window and Hush. The film was released in India on 16 June 2017.

== Plot ==
Jeevan, a famous fiction author, is distressed after his stories become outdated. To write a thriller, he visits a hill station where unexpectedly he gets entangled in a series of horrific events.

== Cast ==
- Kalaiyarasan as Jeevan
- Dhansika as Jeni/Nisha
- Mime Gopi as Thomas
- Daniel Annie Pope as Hospital patient
- Supergood Subramani

== Production ==
From a fashion designing background, new Director Vicky Anand stated that he was inspired by Quentin Tarantino to make films, and had previously assisted director Kalyaan during the making of Kaathadi, before announcing Uru as his debut in November 2016. He revealed that the film is a thriller set in a forest and Kalaiyarasan was signed to play a novel writer, while Dhansika would play the female lead role. The technical crew was revealed to feature Johan Shevanesh as the music director, Prasanna S Kumar as the cinematographer. V.P. Viji as the Producer. Furthermore, Drums Sivamani contributed to the film's title track.

== Reception ==
Baradwaj Rangan called it "A pretty entertaining thriller that asks us to make up our own minds". The Times of India wrote, "One of the positives of Uru, which has a few edge-of-the-seat moments, is its doing away with the done-to-death portrayal of ghosts and the clichéd flashback associated with them. Though the film starts as a laid-back attempt, it gets interesting as the story unfolds, with plenty of twists and turns in the last 30 minutes which are enough to keep viewers hooked".
