= Charles Enterprises =

- Official poster
- Directed by: Subhash Lalitha Subrahmanian
- Written by: Subhash Lalitha Subrahmanian
- Produced by: Dr. Ajith Joy; Achu Vijayan
- Starring: Urvashi; Balu Varghese; Kalaiyarasan; Guru Somasundaram
- Music by: Subramanian KV; Ashok Ponnappan
- Production company: Joy Movie Productions
- Release date: 19 May 2023
- Country: India
- Language: Malayalam
- Box office

Charles Enterprises is a 2023 Indian Malayalam-language comedy film directed by Subhash Lalitha Subrahmanian and produced by Dr. Ajith Joy and Achu Vijayan under the banner Joy Movie Productions. The film stars Urvashi, Balu Varghese, Kalaiyarasan, Guru Somasundaram, Sujith Shanker, Abhija Sivakala, Manikandan Achari, Bhanu, Mridula Madhav and Sudheer Paravoor. The film's music is composed by Subramanian K V and the original background score is by Ashok Ponnappan.

== Cast ==
- Urvashi as Gomathi
- Balu Varghese as Ravi
- Kalaiyarasan as Charles
- Guru Somasundaram as Ravi's Father
- Sujith Shankar as Mallu David
- Abhija Sivakala as Parvatham
- Manikandan Achari as Saravanan
- Aneesh Gopal
- Vineeth Thattil
- Harish Pengan
- Abu Valayamkulam
- Vasishttu
- Bhanu
- Ajisha Prabhakaran as Hema

== Production ==
The title look poster of the film was released by Mohanlal in March 2022 and 9 September 2022 First look poster was released by Mammootty. The film was scheduled to release on 5 May 2023 but it was postponed to 19 May 2023.

== Critical reception ==
Swathi P Ajith critic of Onmanorama wrote that "However, when it comes to depth, the film falls short". Gopika of times of india gave 2.5 stars out of 5 and stated that "The songs in the movie are interesting, especially the ones in the opening credits and at the wedding held in Charles's locality". Anandu Suresh of IndianExpress.com gave 1.5 stars of 5 and wrote that "Despite its marketing as a satire, Charles Enterprises, starring Urvashi and Balu Varghese, falls short of fulfilling its genre, often lacking direction and failing to provide anything fresh to captivate viewers beyond its semi-crime, semi-drama premise."

Scroll.in critic wrote that "A fun premise is undone by sluggishness"
