= Kasu (film) =

- Theatrical release poster
- Directed by: Gowri Manohar
- Written by: Gowri Manohar
- Produced by: S. M. Jalaludeen
- Starring: Rahman; Sangeetha; Rajashree
- Cinematography: Hari Babu
- Edited by: Ganeshkumar
- Music by: V. S. Udhaya
- Production company: Palavodai Amman Creations
- Release date: 29 December 2006
- Running time: 130 minutes
- Country: India
- Language: Tamil

Kasu (transl. Money) is a 2006 Indian Tamil language romantic drama film directed by Gowri Manohar. The film stars Rahman, Sangeetha and Rajashree, with S. S. Chandran, Charle, Rizabawa, Poornam Viswanathan, Mamukkoya, Sobaran and Bonda Mani playing supporting roles. The film, which began production in 1998, was released on 29 December 2006.

== Plot ==
Karan arrives in Kerala with his best friend Sandy to meet the businessman Dileep. At his office, the employees tell them that Dileep is abroad and the two friends decide to stay in Kerala until his return. Karan then comes across Prarthana on multiple occasions and they eventually fall in love with each other. Upon his return, Karan meets Dileep and Dileep refuses to help him. Karan discovers that Prarthana is Dileep's sister. Dileep proposes Karan a deal: either Karan marries his sister without any dowry or Karan takes a huge sum to let go of his sister. Karan surprisingly accepts the money thus breaking Prarthana's heart.

In a flashback, Karan lived with his mentor Viswanathan and his daughter Thulasi. At Thulasi's engagement, the groom's family asked for a huge sum of money and Viswanathan reluctantly accepted. Viswanathan planned to withdraw a property case in Kerala and to take the money so he requested Karan to go to Kerala and to solve the issue.

Back to the present, Karan returns to Chennai with the money to pay the dowry. The day of the wedding, the groom's family ask for more money and the wedding is eventually cancelled. The circumstances force Karan to marry Thulasi on the spot and Viswanathan died of a heart attack that day. Thereafter, Karan becomes a wealthy businessman while Prarthana is diagnosed with depression and has lost all her memory. To cure his sister, Dileep begs Karan to come to the hospital and a remorseful Karan secretly meets her at the hospital. Later, Prarthana regains her memory but the doctor warns them to not mention Karan's marriage. When Thulasi learns of it, she decides to sacrifice her life and attempts to kill herself with sleeping pills. At the hospital, Thulasi is saved and Prarthana realises that Karan sacrificed their love for the good of a family. Prarthana praises Karan for being a genuine person and she accepts her fate. The film ends with Karan and Thulasi hugging each other.

== Cast ==
- Rahman as Karan
- Sangeetha as Prarthana
- Rajashree as Thulasi
- S. S. Chandran as Rathnam
- Charle as Sandy
- Rizabawa as Dileep
- Poornam Viswanathan as Viswanathan
- Mamukkoya as Taxi driver
- Sobaran
- Bonda Mani as Servant
- Akbar
- Raghuvaran
- Salomon
- Periyasamy
- Vasuki as Lakshmi
- Kalpana
- Ganga
- Kavitha Solairaj as Sailaja
- Nirmala Suresh as Herself (cameo appearance)
- V. G. Santhosham as Himself (cameo appearance)
- Yaar Kannan as Himself (cameo appearance)

== Production ==
The film began production under the title Uravukku Mariyathai and was completed in the late 1990s but it remained unreleased for unknown reasons. After the surprise success of Uyir (2006) starring Sangeetha, the producer and the director prompted to release the project.

== Soundtrack ==
Kasu (Uravukku Mariyathai)

Soundtrack album by V. S. Udhaya
- Genre: Feature film soundtrack
- Length: 35:44
- Label: Music Master
- Producer: V. S. Udhaya

The film score and the soundtrack were composed by V. S. Udhaya. The soundtrack features 8 tracks.

All lyrics are written by Mu. Metha.

Tracklist
No.	Title	Singer(s)	Length
1.	"Kaadhal Channel"	P. Unnikrishnan	4:43
2.	"Aayiram Kodi Thaimadi"	P. Unnikrishnan	4:41
3.	"Innisai Mazhaithanil"	Nirosha	5:00
4.	"Nee Oru Paarvai (duet)"	Unni Menon, Nirosha	5:23
5.	"Nandavanath Thendral"	Srinivas	5:44
6.	"Nee Oru Paarvai (solo)"	Unni Menon	1:13
7.	"Aavanik Katru Veesum"	Mano, Sujatha Mohan	4:20
8.	"Kankaliley Computer"	Anuradha Sriram	4:40
Total length:			30:46

== Release and reception ==
Following the rising status of actress Sangeetha after Uyir (2006), the producer and the director took efforts to get the film released which had been in the cans for years.

Indiaglitz wrote, "Both Sangeetha and Rehman have come up with good performance. Sangeetha, who looks younger, plays the role with ease" and concluded that the film was a disappointment. Malini Mannath said, "A weak screenplay, uninspiring narration and some lacklustre characters and performances make Kasu a film better forgotten".
