= Sija Rose =

Indian actress

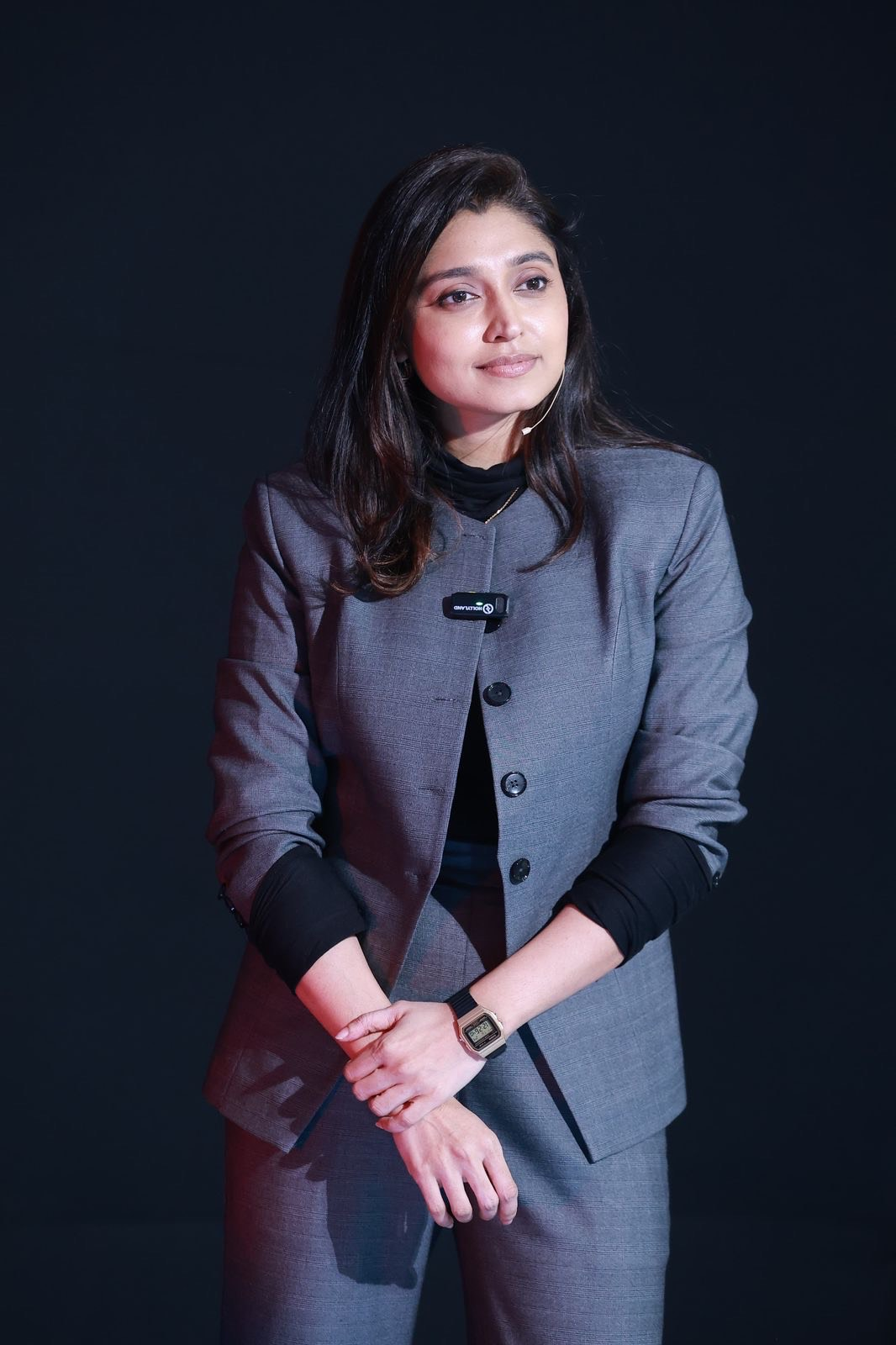
- Rose in TedTalk 2025
- Born: Sija Rose; Muscat, Oman
- Occupations: Actress; Anchor; Dancer
- Years active: 2012–present

Sijaa Rose is an Indian actress who predominantly works in Malayalam, Tamil and Telugu films. She is the daughter of George Philip and Alcy George. Born in India and raised in Muscat, she trained in both classical and western dance forms during her teenage years. She pursued a degree in Mass Media and later completed post-graduation in journalism. Her career took a turn when she began receiving film offers and made her acting debut in the Malayalam film Ustad Hotel.

She went on to play lead and supporting roles in Malayalam cinema and made her Tamil debut with Kozhi Koovuthu. She gained recognition for her role as a teacher in the Tamil film Rekka, which marked a turning point in her career. She also received critical acclaim for portraying a journalist in the Malayalam film Roy.

Her notable appearances include roles in Annayum Rasoolum, Ennu Ninte Moideen, Nee Ko Njaa Cha, and Mili. She later worked as an assistant director with filmmakers Rajesh Pillai, Anwar Rasheed, and Aashiq Abu.

Apart from acting, Sijaa is also involved in painting, particularly coffee art, and participates in stage shows and brand endorsements.

== Filmography ==
=== Films ===
Key
†	Denotes films that have not yet been released

Year	Title	Role	Language	Notes	Ref.
2012	Ustad Hotel	Fazeeha Abdul Razak	Malayalam	—N/a	
2012	Kozhi Koovuthu	Thulasi	Tamil	—N/a	
2013	Nee Ko Njaa Cha	Anjali Menon	Malayalam	—N/a	
2013	Annayum Rasoolum	Lily	Malayalam	—N/a	
2013	Entry	Subaida	Malayalam	—N/a	—N/a
2013	Kaanchi	Lakshmi	Malayalam	—N/a	—N/a
2013	Masani	Kavitha	Tamil	—N/a	
2015	Mili	Raji	Malayalam	Also Assistant Director	
2015	Nellikka	Priya	Malayalam	—N/a	
2015	Ennu Ninte Moideen	Ameena Bichal	Malayalam	—N/a	
2016	Traffic	Rajeev's girlfriend	Hindi	Also Assistant Director	
2016	Kavi Uddheshichathu..?	Lillykutty	Malayalam	—N/a	
2016	Rekka	Mala	Tamil	—N/a	
2017	Bairavaa	Poongodi	Tamil	—N/a	—N/a
2021	Kasada Thapara	Amudhini	Tamil		Streaming release
2021	Udanpirappe	Maragathavalli Vairavan	Tamil	—N/a	
2022	Roy	Teena	Malayalam	Released on SonyLIV	
2024	The Smile Man	Keerthana	Tamil	—N/a	
2025	Sumathi Valavu	Suja	Malayalam	—N/a	
2025	Arjun Chakravarthy	Devika	Telugu		
2025	Padakkuthira	Keerthi	Malayalam		
2026	Secret stories: Roselin	Sobha	Malayalam		

== Early life ==
She was raised in Muscat and Mumbai and completed her schooling at the Indian School Al Wadi Al Kabir in Muscat. She later pursued a degree in Mass Media from B. K. Birla College of Arts, Science and Commerce, Mumbai

Initially aspiring to become a program producer, she actively trained in dance forms such as Bharatanatyam, Kuchipudi, and Bollywood during her school and college years. Her career path shifted towards acting after she began working in advertising and modelling in Kerala, which led to film opportunities.

== Career ==
=== Early work and breakthrough (2012–2015) ===
After completing her graduation, Sijaa Rose travelled to Kerala, where she began modelling and appeared in television commercials, eventually leading to film offers.

She made her Tamil debut with Kozhi Koovuthu (2012). She made her Malayalam debut in Ustad Hotel, where she played a supporting role alongside Dulquer Salmaan. The film was a commercial success.

In 2013, she appeared in three films released on the same day: Nee Ko Njaa Cha, Annayum Rasoolum, and Entry. She played lead roles in Nee Ko Njaa Cha and Entry, and a supporting role as a nun in Annayum Rasoolum.

She also appeared in the Tamil supernatural horror film Masani (2013).

In 2014, she hosted the television reality show Let's Dance on Amrita TV.

=== Established actress (2016–2021) ===
Sijaa took a brief break from acting and worked as an assistant director in advertisements with Anwar Rasheed and Aashiq Abu. She also assisted director Rajesh Pillai in the Hindi remake of Traffic and worked on the Malayalam film Mili (2015), in which she also acted.

She later appeared in Nellikka, followed by a role in the period drama Ennu Ninte Moideen (2015).

In 2016, she appeared in the Malayalam film Kavi Uddheshichathu..? and the Tamil film Rekka. Her role as a teacher in Rekka, starring Vijay Sethupathi, brought her wider recognition.

In 2017, she appeared in the Tamil film Bairavaa, starring Vijay.

After a brief hiatus, she returned in 2021 with Kasada Thapara, an anthology film released on SonyLIV, where she played the role of Amudhini. She also appeared in Udanpirappe (2021), released on Amazon Prime Video.

=== Career progression (2022–present) ===
In 2022, she returned to Malayalam cinema with Roy, directed by Sunil Ibrahim, where she played a journalist. The film was released on SonyLIV.

In 2024, she appeared in The Smile Man, a crime thriller starring R. Sarathkumar, where she portrayed a police officer.

In 2025, she appeared in the Malayalam horror-comedy Sumathi Valavu and the Telugu biographical sports drama Arjun Chakravarthy: Journey of an Unsung Champion, based on the life of Kabaddi player Nagulayya.

She also appeared in the Malayalam film Padakkuthira (2025).

In 2026, she appeared in the Malayalam web series Secret Stories: Roslin, released on JioHotstar, where she played a negative role.

She is also set to appear in the Tamil film Singha.
