= Aravaan =

2012 Indian film by Vasanthabalan

- Theatrical release poster
- Directed by: G. Vasanthabalan
- Screenplay by: G. Vasanthabalan
- Based on: Kaaval Kottam by S. Venkatesan
- Produced by: T. Siva
- Starring: Aadhi; Pasupathy; Dhansika; Archana Kavi
- Cinematography: Siddharth Ramaswamy
- Edited by: Praveen K. L. N. B. Srikanth
- Music by: Karthik
- Production company: Amma Creations
- Distributed by: Vendhar Movies
- Release date: 2 March 2012
- Country: India
- Language: Tamil
- Budget: ₹120 million (US$1.2 million)

Aravaan (transl. Snake) is a 2012 Indian Tamil language epic historical film directed by G. Vasanthabalan, based on S. Venkatesan's novel Kaaval Kottam. It stars Aadhi, Dhansika, Archana Kavi and Pasupathy. Kabir Bedi has a prominent role and Bharath is also featured in a cameo role. The film marks noted playback singer Karthik's debut as a music director. Aravaan was released on 2 March 2012.

== Plot ==
The film is set in the 18th century and is about a group of people who steal from the wealthy to provide food and shelter for their tribe. Komboodhi is the leader of the gang and always succeeds and keeps his villagers meagerly fed. One day, the general of their small kingdom visits Komboodhi's village and threatens to kill them all as one of them had single-handedly stolen the Queen's diamond necklace. Komboodhi refuses this as they rob only as a gang and makes a wager with the general. If the general gives their village the thief, the villagers would work for the palace for a year. On the other hand, if Komboodhi gives the general the Queen's necklace, the general must provide them with rice for two years.

On the search, he meets the brave Varipuli and identifies him as the lone thief. He brings Varipuli to his village with the necklace, and the villagers get enough rice for two years. A bond develops between the two. Varipuli joins Komboodhi's gang, and they make many heists. Komboodhi's sister falls in love with Varipuli, and when Komboodhi asks for his identity, Varipuli bluntly refuses for the marriage and is housed from the village.

The next day during a bullfight, Komboodhi is badly injured, and Varipuli tries to save him by becoming his replacement. When Komboodhi refuses as he is a wanderer and does not have any ancestry, Varipuli says that his mother was from Komboodhi's village and saves him. Suddenly, a few guards arrest Varipuli and take him to another village.

Varipuli has a past. His real name is Chinna. He is a brave person who belongs to a village that does the palace and local security. One day, a youth named Thogaimayan from the neighbouring village is found dead in the middle of their village. A big fight erupts between the villages. The king of their kingdom intervenes and orders Chinna's village to give a young man of the same age as an offering to God as a penalty.

Chinna becomes an accidental choice. 30 days are given a timeline for his execution. He is in love with a girl in the same village called Vannapechi. After Chinna is chosen to be the offering to the god, Chinna's lover asks her father to permit her to marry Chinna to at least spend his last days together. They marry on the third day. On the 29th day, Chinna finds a fellow villager running with a piece of costly silver jewellery. When Chinna asks him about it, the man replies that he got it from the dead Thogaimayan's hand. Chinna later finds out from a rich prostitute that it belongs to the king himself, as he had abducted her the next day that she became a woman and raped her. Chinna realizes the fact that the killer was the village's King. He secretly confronts the king, and the king reveals the story.

The heirless old king abducts and forcefully marries the only princess of the neighbouring king Om, who was about to be married to her love, by killing all her family members. The king believes that he has expanded his kingdom, as well as got a new attempt to get a son, but the new Queen does not let him touch her. Months later, the king's second wife is found out to be pregnant. The Queen reveals that she is having the baby of the barbarian Thogaimayan in order to take revenge from him as she was the princess of a neighbouring kingdom and this King had killed everyone from her family. She proudly says that his heir will not be a royalty but the son of a barbarian. The king finds out that it was Thogaimayan who created this chaos and kills him and his second wife in the village. Chinna captures the king and tries taking him back to the village, but the king escapes and jumps in a waterfall to avoid the villagers from discovering the truth. Chinna jumps as well but hurts his leg and comes out, only to find that the King is dead.

Meanwhile, in the village, as Chinna was still missing, the villagers sacrifice Chinna's married friend due to the pressure from the other villages, but the village head tells everyone that they all have a right to kill Chinna as he has bought a disgrace to the village. Chinna gets well and meets his family to know that his wife is pregnant. He says he will go to the killing, but his wife tells him to wait and to see the baby's face before leaving, but her father tells Chinna to go out of the village and not come back for ten years as the villagers will forgive anyone after ten years of exile as the villagers will not believe the truth. Chinna leaves, but the neighbouring villagers find him in nine years and eleven months.

At present, Komboodhi and his friends save Chinna and take him in the way they came back again, but Chinna surrenders as he does not want to live a life like that. He sees his son's face for the first and last time, and later, he gets a knife and kills himself. Honouring his last wish, Komboodhi's villagers cease to rob and become guards of places.

== Cast ==
- Aadhi as Varipuli/Chinna
- Pasupathy as Komboodhi
- Dhansika as Vannapechi
- Archana Jose Kavi as Chimitti
- Karikaalan as Mathara
- Singampuli
- Thirumurugan as Veeranna
- Vijayachander as Paalaiya Karar
- Vinod Raj as Vannapechi’s father
- Kuberan
- T. K. Kala as Vannapechi's aunt

Special appearances by

- Bharath as Thogaimayan
- Shweta Menon as Rajaambaal
- Anjali as Vanchi
- Shruti Marathe as Kanaganuga
- Kavignar Vikramathithan

== Production ==
=== Development ===
In April 2010, following the success of Angaadi Theru, Vasanthabalan started working on his new project based on Su. Venkatesan's novel Kaaval Kottam, a novel depicting the history of Madurai during 1310–1910, which was released in 2009. Aravaan's story would be based on one chapter from the novel, running to about 10 pages, with Vasanthabalan claiming that he expanded it and took one year for penning the scriptment, further telling that he had tried to "mix action and emotion". The director said that he included more characters and incidents into the script, disclosing that the film's lead character Varipuli was not there in the short story and that he created him and gave a name.

=== Casting ===
Vasanthabalan selected Aadhi to portray the lead character of Varipuli, after he had seen him performing in Mirugam and Eeram, citing that he chose him because of his height and his nose. Aadhi was further requested to develop six pack abs, which he accomplished in three months. Pasupathy, who earlier was cast in Vasanthabalan's Veyil, was chosen to essay another lead role, since he had the "looks and complexion" of the character he plays, apart from his "powerful eyes and his talent to portray a gamut of emotions". Vasanthabalan offered Dhansika, best known for playing a lead role in Peraanmai, the lead female character of Vannapechi, for she had the "sharp features and dusky skin" required for the role. Malayali actress Archana Kavi was hired for her first Tamil film to play the role of Chimitti, a bold and aggressive woman who "loves to take control of everything around her", with Archana reporting that the character was "unlike her real self" and that she had difficulties to "get the body language and the Madurai Tamil right". In January 2011, Hindi film actor Kabir Bedi who had also appeared in several international productions, notably in the 1983 James Bond film Octopussy, was signed for a significant role, making his Tamil film debut, while the following month, actor Bharath, who had collaborated with Vasanthabalan in Veyil as well, accepted to perform a cameo role. In August 2011 reports confirmed that Malayali model-actress Shweta Menon would appear in a cameo role as a dasi.

=== Filming ===
Since the film was set in the past, the crew needed to find locations that had no trace of "modern life" yet and searched for remote unsettled areas devoid of cell phone towers, overhead power lines and tarred roads. Cinematographer Siddharth commented that it took him four months to find a suitable location.

The film was shot primarily at four locations, a small village Arithapatti in Madurai, where the major portions of the film were shot, Courtallam, Hogenakkal in Tamil Nadu, and forest areas in Kerala and Andhra Pradesh. Arithapatti was a place that boasted off many caves, streams and huge valleys. The place further had hundreds of huts made of bamboo straws, palm leaves and stones and a Karuppan Temple. Siddharth stated these locations were chosen as the film had two different tones; the first of half of the film took place in a hot, dry, barren land and the entire portion was shot in Arithapatti, while the flashback scenes would happen in a humid area with greenery, water and huge trees, which was canned in Courtallam and the Kerala forests. The first shots were filmed in the Achankovil forests in Kerala. In Ovvamalai, near Melur, a settlement of 100 houses was created, while another set was erected at Kongaimalai, near Tenkasi. Art director Vijay Murugan needed fifty days to erect the sets. The scene where buffaloes are sacrificed was shot in dense forests in Tamil Nadu-Kerala border. Producer Siva said that he ordered 5,000 panchas and 3,000 cheeras specially made from Erode and Karur to give it a historical feel. Aadhi injured himself while performing a risky stunt sequence, in which the protagonist had to jump over a five feet palm tree.

== Soundtrack ==
Aravaan

Soundtrack album by Karthik
- Released: 22 December 2009
- Recorded: 2011
- Genre: Soundtrack
- Length: 29:33
- Language: Tamil
- Label: Junglee Music
- Producer: Karthik

Karthik chronology
Aravaan (2009)	Okkadine (2013)

The soundtrack was composed by playback singer Karthik, debuting as a composer through this film.

Track listing
No.	Title	Lyrics	Singer(s)	Length
1.	"Oore Oore Ennapetha"	Viveka	Krishnaraj, Mukesh, Periya Karuppu Thevar, Rita, Priya	5:01
2.	"Nila Nila Poguthae"	Na. Muthukumar	Vijay Prakash, Harini	5:30
3.	"Poosaripatti Kalavu"	Na. Muthukumar	Mano, Pasupathy, Kottaichami, Karunanidhi, Rahul Nambiar, M. L. R. Karthikeyan, Vijay Narain, Malathy, Rajendran Harish	2:33
4.	"Unna Kolla Poren"	Na. Muthukumar	M. L. R. Karthikeyan, Bhavatharini	4:02
5.	"Naagamalai Sanchuidchu"	Na. Muthukumar	Gopal Rao, Seerkazhi Sivachidambaram	6:34
6.	"Nanadakumara"	Na. Muthukumar	Subhiksha	2:53
7.	"Oruvaan Irruvaan"	Na. Muthukumar	Karthik	3:00
Total length:				29:33

=== Critical reception ===
Pavithra Srinivasan of Rediff.com rated the soundtrack 3 out of 5 stars and wrote: "Aravaan is worth a listen." Milliblog wrote: "Disappointingly safe and innocuous composing debut by Karthik." Musicaloud called it, "A debut replete with feel-good songs, but devoid of much innovativeness." Musicperk wrote: "In his very first attempt, singer Karthik has proved himself as a promising music director. He used to charm us with his singing and now his compositions are equally charming. He does justice to this period film."

== Critical reception ==
Pavithra Srinivasan from Rediff.com gave it four out of five stars, labelling it as "brilliant" and calling it a "must-watch film". The reviewer further commented: "Aravaan is a slice of life from 18th-century Tamil Nadu, with its lifestyle, humour, sorrows, loves and losses documented in painstaking fashion. This is an ode to history that deserves every bit of attention it receives. As such, it's one of those movies that deserve to become a legend." The film was also reviewed by Malathi Rangarajan of The Hindu.
