= Love Today (2004 film) =

- Poster
- Directed by: Arputhan
- Written by: Arputhan
- Produced by: R. B. Choudary
- Starring: Uday Kiran; Divya Khosla
- Cinematography: M. S. Prabhu
- Edited by: Nandamuri Hari
- Music by: Vidyasagar
- Production company: Super Good Films
- Release date: 5 February 2004
- Country: India
- Language: Telugu

Love Today is a 2004 Indian Telugu-language romantic drama film directed by Arputhan. The film stars Uday Kiran and debutante Divya Khosla.

== Cast ==
- Uday Kiran as Shiva
- Divya Khosla as Parvatha Vardhini (Shruthi)
- Sunil as Dharma
- Devadarshini as Dharma's wife
- Srinivasa Reddy
- Babloo
- Suman Setty
- Raghunatha Reddy
- Tanikella Bharani
- Sameer
- Siva Parvathy
- Kaushal Manda as Kaushal
- Vindya as an item number

== Production ==
Divya Khosla, who starred opposite Salman Khan in the music video Zid Na Karo Ye Dil Ka Mamla Hai and in Reliance Communications mobile advertisement, was roped in to play the lead opposite Uday Kiran. The film was previously titled as Lovers.

== Soundtrack ==
The music was composed by Vidyasagar.

Song title	Singers	Notes
"Sunday"	Tippu	
"I Love You"	Tippu, Srilekha Parthasarathy	Based on Tamil song "I Love You" from Uyirodu Uyiraga
"Oh Prema"	Shankar Mahadevan	
"Walking"	Hariharan, Tippu	Based on Malayalam song "Elamankanniloode... I Am Thinking of You" from Sathyam Sivam Sundaram
"Cheppave"	Sadhana Sargam	Based on Tamil song "Silendra Theepori Ondru" from Thithikudhe
"Aey Pilla"	Tippu, Bablu	

== Reception ==
The film released to mixed reviews. A critic from Idlebrain.com gave the film two point five out of five stars and wrote how the film feels lengthy. Additionally, the reviewer praised the techinal aspects of the film, the performances of Uday Kiran and the supporting cast especially Devadarshini stating how she "would be suitable for akka [sister] & vadina [sister-in-law] roles in Telugu films". A critic from Sify wrote that "Director Aprudhan has a very thin storyline as the film moves at a snail pace. Unfortunately Love Today has nothing new to offer and ultimately lacks any style or soul". A critic from Full Hyderabad wrote that "When the crux of the movie is about dealing with misunderstandings, they should've at least tried to show some remotely sensible reason for all the squabbles. With such an effort from the makers' side, the outcome is only ordinary". Telugu Cinema wrote "The story of the movie is narrated in a confusing way because of the bad screenplay by Arputham. The story line of the movie is very thin and the entire film runs very slow. Direction of the movie is also bad. The climax of the movie is another minus point".
