= Arputhan =

Indian film director (c. 1971–2023)

- Born: c. 1971; Tamil Nadu, India
- Died: 7 November 2023 (aged 52); Chennai, Tamil Nadu, India
- Occupation: Film director
- Years active: 2002–2023

Arputhan (c. 1971 – 7 November 2023) was an Indian film director, who directed Tamil- and Telugu-language films. He rose to fame through the romantic drama Arputham (2002), and went on to make feature films including the dramas Love Today (2004) and Manathodu Mazhaikalam (2006).

== Career ==
Arputhan made his directorial debut through Arputham (2002), a romantic drama film produced by R. B. Choudary. The film starred noted choreographer Raghava Lawrence, Kunal and Anu Prabhakar in the lead roles, and won positive reviews upon release. A reviewer from ChennaiOnline.com noted "it is debutant director Arputhan's arrangement of scenes and his thoughtfully written lines in the second half that stand out". A critic from The Hindu noted "Arpudhan's story is predictable and his dialogue passable, yet his screenplay and direction are strong points".

Arputhan went on to make another film for R. B. Choudary in Telugu titled Love Today (2004), starring Uday Kiran and Divya Khosla Kumar in the lead roles. He subsequently made a return to Tamil cinema through Manathodu Mazhaikalam (2006), a romantic drama starring Shaam, Jayasurya, Nithya Das and Sameksha in the lead roles. In 2007, he worked on En Peyar Enna, a short film with no dialogues featuring schoolboy V. P. Kishorekumar in the lead role.

== Death ==
Arputhan died following an accident on 7 November 2023, at the age of 52.

== Filmography ==
Year	Film	Language	Notes
2002	Arputham	Tamil	
2004	Love Today	Telugu	
2006	Manathodu Mazhaikalam	Tamil	
