= Manathodu Mazhaikalam =

- Title card
- Directed by: Arputhan
- Written by: Arputhan
- Produced by: Antony
- Starring: Shaam; Nithya Das; Jayasurya; Sameksha
- Cinematography: Raghav
- Edited by: Raja Mohammad
- Music by: Karthik Raja
- Production company: ELK Productions
- Release date: 22 September 2006
- Running time: 145 minutes
- Country: India
- Language: Tamil

Manathodu Mazhaikalam (transl. The heart with the rainy season) is a 2006 Indian Tamil-language buddy drama film directed by Arputhan, starring Shaam, Nithya Das, Jayasurya, and Sameksha. It was Arputhan's final directorial venture before his death on 7 November 2023.

== Plot ==
Siva (Shaam) and Sathya (Nithya Das) are college mates and good friends who always look out for each other. Their friendship continues even after their college days. Siva's and Sathya's parents mistake their friendship for an affair. The two clarify that they are platonic friends with oneness in their thoughts. In the course of time, Siva marries Sruthi (Sameksha) and Sathya marries Karthik (Jayasurya). Sruthi soon becomes pregnant but dies of childbirth complications. Siva is left to raise his son on his own. Many years pass, and Siva's son begins to treat him badly, leaving him destitute. At the same time, Karthik informs Siva that Sathya is on her deathbed due to heart problems. Sathya later dies. The film ends as Karthik and Siva, both widowers, walk together, vowing to remain good friends for the remainder of their lives.

== Cast ==
- Shaam as Siva
- Nithya Dass as Sathya
- Jaisurya as Karthik
- Shamiksha as Sruthi
- T. P. Gajendran as Narayanan
- Vinod Raj as Siva's father
- Boys Rajan as Sathya's father
- Shyam Ganesh as Siva's son
- Malavika as Hemalatha
- Rindhiya as Siva's daughter-in-law
- Ganesh Babu as Jegan
- Akhila Prakash as Sathya's friend
- Marina as Marina

== Production ==
The film is directed by Arputhan, who previously directed Arputham (2002). The film was launched on 24 October 2005 at Prasad Studios. Shaam veered away from his chocolate boy looks and portrayed an old man at the beginning and end of this film. The film was shot at Christ College, Irinjalakuda. Karthik Raja reportedly composed music for the film in a houseboat in Kerala. A song featuring Shaam and Samiksha was shot at Athirapalli falls.

== Soundtrack ==
Soundtrack was composed by Karthik Raja. The lyrics are written by Na. Muthukumar.

Track listing
No.	Title	Singer(s)	Length
1.	"Welcome To"	Sukhwinder Singh, Rahul Seth
2.	"Unakkum Enakkum"	Ranjith, Bobby, Priya, Saravanan
3.	"Kangal Theduthey"	Sadhana Sargam, Jassie Gift
4.	"Pani Vizhum Kaalam"	Karthik Raja, Madhushree, Premji Amaren
5.	"Aayiram Vanavil"	Sadhana Sargam, Madhu Balakrishnan

== Reception ==
A critic from Ananda Vikatan criticised the film's story but praised the background score. Malini Mannath of Chennai Online opined that "It's a feel-good film, which would have felt better, and more engaging, with a tighter script and a firmer grip on the narration". Lajjavathi of Kalki praised the performance of Shaam however he couldn't able to carry off old man's role while also appreciating the acting of Samiksha and Nithya Das, she noted that flashback was familiar, calling screenplay as predictable and panned the director for dragging the film. A critic from Cinesouth wrote that "The film is without obscenity and irritating moments. The whole story has been beautifully conceived as a poem on celluloid by director Arpudhan, but he seems to have lost it in the screenplay and direction. So Manadhodu Mazhaikalam is like an umbrella with holes". A critic from Sify wrote, "On the whole, this friendship tale is confusing".
