= Dhanam (2008 film) =

2008 Tamil drama film

- Theatrical release poster
- Directed by: G. Shiva
- Written by: G. Shiva
- Produced by: S. Kousalyarani
- Starring: Sangeetha; Prem
- Cinematography: Jeeva; Srinivas Devamsam
- Edited by: B. Lenin
- Music by: Ilaiyaraaja
- Production company: Sri Nandhi Medu Selliamman Movies
- Release date: 5 September 2008
- Running time: 154 minutes
- Country: India
- Language: Tamil

Dhanam is a 2008 Indian Tamil-language drama film written and directed by G. Shiva. The film stars Sangeetha and Prem, while Kota Srinivasa Rao, Ashish Vidyarthi, Manobala, Karunas, and Girish Karnad play supporting roles. The film's score and soundtrack are composed by Ilayaraja. The film was released on 5 September 2008.

== Plot ==
The film opens with a cop and his assistant searching for a prostitute named Dhanam in the streets of Hyderabad. While they ask the public around the streets about Dhanam, a flashback breaks out.

The story goes five years back from the present day. Ananth, a young student from a Hindu Brahmin family based in Kumbakonam, comes to Hyderabad to work. There he meets Dhanam, falls in love with her, and begins to follow her for several days. She suspects that Ananth came to her to do business and takes him to her place. They both have sex for money, and this begins to happen frequently.

One day, Ananth opens up his feelings to Dhanam, but she refuses his proposal, lets the public in the street beat him up and walks away. Dhanam's close friends tell her to stop living as a prostitute and start over her life by live with Ananth. They both meet at a temple and have an argument. Dhanam finally comes with a decision that if Ananth's family accepts her, she will marry him. The next day, they both go to Kumbakonam to visit Ananth's family. After hearing that Dhanam is a prostitute and that Ananth wants to marry her, his family refuses to accept the marriage. A priest named Vedhagiri (Kota Srinivasa Rao) who is a good family friend of Ananth's family, forces them to accept the marriage by telling them that the horoscopes match. The family immediately goes to Hyderabad and arrange everything for the marriage. They both get married the next day. However, this is a trap by Vedhagiri. Earlier, he asked Dhanam in Hyderabad to have sex for money and now uses this situation to get closer to Dhanam, but she tells him to stay away.

Some days later, Ananth and his family ask her why she began with prostitution. She says that her mother used to be a prostitute and Dhanam was the only child for her. Her mother wanted her to not follow her tracks and kept her as a virgin. One day when her mother was very ill, a man fooled Dhanam by saying that he will take her to the hospital so that they can bring the doctor home, but he raped her on the way. She began to have sex for money to save her sick mother, but unfortunately, her mother died some days later. Since Dhanam was too young and she did not have anyone to take care of her, she began with prostitution and settled down in Gandhi Theru. After hearing this, Ananth and his family could understand her pain and ask for an apology for not understanding her earlier.

The next day, Dhanam gets pregnant. During her pregnancy, Vedhagiri tries to make a deal with Dhanam, but she refuses again. This begins to happen often. Dhanam keeps this secretly from her husband and in-laws because they have a lot of respect for him. Dhanam later gives birth to a baby girl. After the birth, the family begins to go through a hard time. They ask Vedhagiri to check the horoscope and find out why this happens. Vedhagiri says that the time the baby was born was not good. He says that the baby has to die or everyone in the family will die within a year. The family keeps this secret for Dhanam and kills the baby by feeding it with poison. Some days after the death of her child, Dhanam finds out that her in-laws were behind the murder. Dhanam, who saw her daughter as her mother, becomes stressed and grieves over her dead baby. The flashback ends with Dhanam killing her husband, in-laws and Vedhagiri by giving them poisoned food.

The cop and his assistant go to the cop and the judge who closed the case of the murder of Dhanam's husband, her in-laws and Vedhagiri and have a conversation about the case. The cop and the assistant asked the cop and the judge about their opinion. They both said that Dhanam is innocent and just showed the anger a mother has. The film ends with the cop and the assistant closing the case and letting Dhanam go.

== Cast ==
- Sangeetha as Dhanalekshmi
- Prem as Ananthu
- Kota Srinivasa Rao as Vedhagiri
- Ashish Vidyarthi as Nambiar
- Girish Karnad as Ananth's father
- Karunas as Ananth's uncle
- Manobala as Nambiar's assistant
- Ilavarasu as Dhanam's friend
- Rajyalakshmi as Ananth's mother
- M. S. Bhaskar
- Chinni Jayanth
- Singamuthu
- Sashikumar Subramani as Kothandam
- Raj Kapoor as Inspector Kapoor
- Santhana Bharathi as Judge
- Crane Manohar
- Scissor Manohar as Shop Owner
- Kovai Senthil
- Citizen Mani
- E. Ramdoss

== Production ==
The film was launched at Prasad Sound Studios on 1 December 2006.

== Soundtrack ==
The album includes seven songs composed by Ilaiyaraaja.

Song title	Singers	Lyrics
"Kattilukku Matthumthana Pombala"	Ilaiyaraaja	Muthulingam
"Ilamai Kanavugal"	Karthik, Rita	Vaali
"Ulagam Kidakkuthu"	Sunitha Sarathy	Vaali
"Dhanam Dhanam"	Karthik, Chorus	Vaali
"Kootthu Onnu "	Ilaiyaraaja, Feji Mani	Palani Bharathi
"Unakkul Irukkiren "	Sriram Parthasarathy, Bela Shende	Mu. Metha
"Kannanukku Enna"	Bhavatharini, Sriram Parthasarathy, Prasanna	Vishali Kannadhasan

== Reception ==
Sify wrote, "Shiva is bold to take such a subject, but his handling, slow pace and too many songs makes Dhanam excruciatingly laboured, the film is dark and depressing". Pavithra Srinivasan of Rediff.com wrote, "Altogether a washed out product that passes itself off as a 'serious' film, but instead takes the viewer for a disappointing ride". S. R. Ashok Kumar of The Hindu wrote, "The story of a commercial sex worker is not new to screen. It is the presentation that makes the difference", and Dhanam "makes an impression mainly for the way the stars have performed and the expertise of the people on the technical side".
