= Qadeesso =

Indian Malayalam language drama film

- Directed by: Pradeep Cherian
- Written by: Pradeep Cherian
- Produced by: Shagun Goel; Shalendra Goel; Suman Goel; Prabha Govil; Rakesh Govil
- Starring: Sanal Aman; Sunil Babu; Devaki Bhaagi
- Cinematography: Fowzia Fathima
- Edited by: Pradeep Cherian
- Music by: Erdag Duru; Joseph John; Mushkilaca
- Production company: Shally Suman Production
- Release date: 28 June 2024
- Country: India
- Language: Malayalam

Qadeesso (lit. 'The Sacred') is a 2024 Indian Malayalam language drama film edited and directed by Pradeep Cherian in his directorial debut. The film was premiered at the World film festival, Cannes 2024.

== Summary ==
Qadeesso is the story of Father Job Abraham, a Syrian orthodox priest of a difficult parish, where members are embroiled in issues related to burial of a poor parishioner, due to lack of space in the cemetery. Fr. Job finds himself becoming a confidante to Elisabeth, a divorcee and sister of Church secretary Captain Cherian and offers advice and solace to his sickly wife, Rosamma Cherian, But Fr. Job's compassion towards his fellow beings is misunderstood by the hypocritical laity and he gets mired in controversies due to his humanist stand.

== Cast ==
- Sanal Aman - Fr Job Abraham
- Devaki Bhaagi - Elizabeth
- Pradeep Dharmapalan - Captain Cherian
- Reena Indrayani - Rossamma Cherian
- Renji Oomen - Sunny Abraham
- Michael Joseph - Fr Kuriakose
- Sunil Babu - Monayi

== Production ==
Pradeep Cherian, nephew of John Abraham launched himself as the feature film director with Qadeesso, mosty shot at Kottayam. He revealed that the story of the film was written much before COVID-19 pandemic. Cherian signed his better half Fowzia Fathima as the cinematographer of the film.

== Accolades ==
- Won Best Philosophical film - Category of Spiritual/Mystical film - World Film Festival, Cannes 2024.
- Best Debut Director - Finalist - World Film Festival, Cannes 2024.
- Official Selection - 17th Bangladesh International Short & Independent Film Festival.
- Honorable Selection - Best Film on Religion - Indo Dubai International Film Festival 2024
- Honorable Selection - Debut Director - Indo Dubai International Film Festival 2024
