= The Smile Man =

2024 Tamil crime mystery film

- Theatrical release poster
- Directed by: Syam; Praveen
- Written by: Kamala Alchemis
- Produced by: Salildas; Aneesh Haridasan; Anandan T
- Starring: R. Sarathkumar; Sri Kumar; Sija Rose; Ineya; Kalaiyarasan
- Cinematography: Vikram Mohan
- Edited by: San Lokesh
- Music by: Gavaskar Avinash
- Production companies: Magnum Movies; Ka Film Company
- Distributed by: GRR Movies
- Release date: 27 December 2024
- Country: India
- Language: Tamil

The Smile Man is a 2024 Indian Tamil-language crime-mystery thriller film directed by duo directors, Syam and Praveen, while being written by Kamala Alchemis. The film stars R. Sarathkumar in the lead role, making his 150th film, with an ensemble cast consisting of Sri Kumar, Sija Rose, Ineya, Kalaiyarasan, George Maryan, Suresh Chandra Menon, Rajkumar, Kumar Natarajan, Baby Azhiya and others in supporting roles.

The film is produced by Salil Das, Anish Haridasan, and Anandan T under Magnum Movies and Ka Film Company banners. The technical crew consists of cinematographer Vikram Mohan, editor San Lokesh and music composer Gavaskar Avinash.

The Smile Man released on 27 December 2024.

== Plot ==
Near Coimbatore, a person is shot dead with a distinctive 'Smile Man' mark on the face. Meanwhile, Chidambaram Nedumaaran is involved in a car accident, where an unknown assailant attacks him. Five years later, Chidambaram is struggling with Alzheimer's disease, and his doctor informs him that he will lose all his memories within a year. To preserve his experiences, Chidambaram writes a book about the serial killing cases he solved, including the infamous 'Smile Man' case, which remains incomplete.

At the book launch, Chidambaram meets Aravind, a CBCID officer and the son of his former colleague Venkatesh, who went missing five years ago during a mission with Chidambaram. Chidambaram contacts Veerayya, who provides information about four convicted culprits who are now free. Chidambaram secretly follows them, and after a brief conversation with one of the culprits, he is murdered by the same 'Smile Man' pattern. The CBCID team suspects a serial killer is on the loose again, coinciding with the publication of Chidambaram's book. Despite his doctor's advice, Chidambaram joins forces with Aravind to hunt down the 'Smile Man' psycho-serial killer. As Chidambaram's memory lapses become more frequent, he records conversations during the investigation. Chidambaram suspects that it's a copycat killing, suggesting the original killer has resumed their spree. A person claiming to be the 'Smile Man' killer voluntarily appears at the CBCID office, but Chidambaram quickly identifies the imposter. Meanwhile, Veerayya is killed by the real killer, even before Chidambaram could arrive as he was struggling to recall the address. Chidambaram alerts Aravind and the police, but they mistakenly arrest an auto driver. After analyzing traffic CCTV footage, the police catch a glimpse of the killer and their vehicle.

Chidambaram, regretful of failing to apprehend the killer, decides to withdraw from the investigation. Aravind discovers a mobile phone with Chidambaram's call at Veerayya's house, prompting him to confront Chidambaram. Chidambaram begins to recount the past, where Aravind's father, Venkatesh, was his superior officer investigating the serial killings. Chidambaram had withdrawn from that case due to personal reasons but later discovered that Venkatesh had falsely closed the case by killing an innocent carpenter after his wife came lamenting about the murder. Chidambaram confronted Venkatesh, who tricked and shot him. Chidambaram shot Venkatesh in self-defense but was shocked to find the 'Smile Man' mark on Venkatesh's face. As Chidambaram pursued the speeding jeep escaping the scene, he was involved in the car accident shown at the beginning of the film.

Aravind, enraged upon learning that Chidambaram had killed his father initiates an investigation on Chidambaram. They discover that the 2016 murders occurred near Chidambaram's residences and that his fiancée, Chithra, and her daughter, Yanu were victims of the psycho killer. Chidambaram is placed under house arrest, but he orchestrates a press conference to attract the psycho-killer's attention towards him. Aravind's investigation about Chithra leads him to Prabhu, a mortuary employee, who is revealed to be the psycho killer. Chidambaram suspects that Aravind might be the killer's next target. However, Prabhu kills the wife of a carpenter, who was wrongly framed by Venkatesh five years ago. He hangs the corpse in Aravind's house, leaving a note indicating one more kill remains. Prabhu confronts Chidambaram, and after a struggle, Chidambaram subdues him.

Prabhu begins to narrate his connection to Chidambaram and the serial killings. He reveals that he started killing his friends when they distanced themselves from him, making them smile after death. Prabhu's obsession with Chithra, a nurse, grew when Chidambaram became close to her daughter, Yanu. Prabhu forced Yanu to ask her mother to marry him, resulting in Yanu's death. Chithra, devastated by her daughter's demise, commits suicide by hanging. After recounting his past, Prabhu attacks Chidambaram, but Aravind and Keerthana intervene, rescuing Chidambaram and hospitalizing him. Chidambaram awakens, overhears Prabhu's recorded conversation, and heads to the mortuary. Despite his memory loss, Chidambaram subdues and kills Prabhu. Aravind confesses the truth, revealing that his father covered up the truth and that Chidambaram is the real hero. Meanwhile, Chidambaram is shown in a rehabilitation center, having forgotten his past.

== Cast ==
- R. Sarathkumar as Chidambaram Nedumaaran
- Kalaiyarasan as Prabhu
- Sri Kumar as Aravind, CBCID officer
- Sija Rose as Keerthana, CBCID officer
- Suresh Chandra Menon as Venkatesh, Aravind's father
- Ineya as Chithra, a nurse
- George Maryan as Veerayya, a retired clerk
- Kumar Natarajan as Ganapathi Balamurugan, CBCID Head
- Hareesh Peradi as the one who pretends to be the killer
- Rajkumar as Pichumani, CBCID officer
- Baby Azhiya as Yanu, Chithra's daughter
- Priyadarshini Rajkumar as a doctor

== Production ==
=== Development ===
In mid-February 2022, an announcement was made regarding actor R. Sarath Kumar's 150th film titled The Smile Man to be directed by Memories (2023) fame duo Syam and Praveen and written by Kamala Alchemis. The film also stars Sri Kumar, Sija Rose, Ineya, George Maryan, Suresh Chandra Menon, Rajkumar, Kumar Natarajan, Baby Azhiya and others in supporting roles. The film is produced by Salil Das, Anish Haridasan, and Anandan T under Magnum Movies and Ka Film Company banners, and the technical crew consists of cinematographer Vikram Mohan, editor San Lokesh and music composer Gavaskar Avinash.

=== Filming ===
Principal photography was planned in places around Palakkad and Coimbatore, which began after the announcement in mid-February 2022 and got wrapped in June 2023.

== Release ==
=== Theatrical ===
The Smile Man released on 27 December 2024. The film received a U/A certificate from the Central Board of Film Certification.

=== Home media ===
The digital streaming rights of the film is acquired by Aha Tamil.

== Reception ==
A critic from Dinamalar rated the film 2.75/5 stars, criticizing the screenplay for being slow-paced, which they found unusual for a crime thriller film. Abhinav Subramanian of The Times of India gave 2.5/5 stars and wrote "The Smile Man feels like a missed opportunity. It’s yet another run-of-the-mill serial killer story. It’s not a terrible film, just a terribly average one." Janani K of India Today gave 2/5 stars and wrote "The Smile Man is a lost opportunity considering the potential it showed. If only the screenplay had been handled better, the film could have had a much stronger impact." Anusha Sundar of OTT Play gave 2/5 stars and wrote "The Smile Man adds itself to one among the dozen serial killer stories that gets made as part of trend. With a non-coherent storytelling and distanced emotions, the film fails to neither resonate nor engross."

Narayani M of Cinema Express gave 2/5 stars and wrote "Just like Iraivan, The Smile Man employs a lethargic and straightforward approach to finding the killer. Since the writing is confusing, the makers could have stuck to showcasing their killer up front and his emotionally distant backstory." Bhuvanesh Chandar of The Hindu wrote "From the investigation that leads to the killer or the flashback to Chidambaram that the film holds back so preciously, nothing sticks. [...] Unfortunately, his much-awaited 150th outing may not leave him as a smiling man."
