= Akka (TV series) =

Indian Tamil-language soap opera

- Also known as: Elder Sister
- அக்கா
- Genre: Soap opera
- Directed by: Raghuvasan; V.Chandrasekhar
- Starring: Kausalya; Nithya Das; Vadivukkarasi; Rajesh
- Original language: Tamil
- No. of seasons: 1
- No. of episodes: 143

Production
- Camera setup: Multi-camera
- Running time: approx. 20-22 minutes per episode

Original release
- Network: Jaya TV
- Release: 15 September 2014 – 9 April 2015

Akka (Tamil: அக்கா; transl. Elder Sister) is an Indian Tamil-language soap opera aired on Jaya TV. The show premiered on 15 September 2014 and aired Monday through Friday at 8:30PM IST. The series stars Kausalya, Nithya Das, Feroz Khan and Akhila. The show last aired on 9 April 2015 and ended with 143 episodes.

== Plot ==
The plot consisted of Manimegalai searching for her lost sisters, and the serial ended with her death which brought her family back together again.

== Cast ==
- Kausalya as Manimegalai
- Nithya Das as Seetha
- Vadivukkarasi
- Rajesh
- Ferozkhan as Arun
- Chitra Lakshmanan
- Shyam Ganesh
- Akhila as Geetha
- Suhashini
- Manikandan
