= Fowzia Fathima =

Indian film cinematographer, producer, academic and director

- Born: Chennai, Tamil Nadu, India
- Education: Film and Television Institute of India
- Occupations: Cinematographer, film director
- Years active: 1998–present
- Known for: Mitr, My Friend
- Spouse: Pradeep Cherian
- Children: 2
- Awards: Kerala State Television Award (2015)

Fowzia Fathima is an Indian film cinematographer, producer, academic and director. Fowzia is known for her cinematography on feature films such as Mitr, My Friend (2002), Gulumaal: The Escape (2009) and Uyir (2006). She is an intuitive practitioner of cinematography across media technologies, a hands-on academic with an eye trained in history of art practices along with a wide range of experience in Film Production and Teaching in contemporary cinema based in India.

Fowzia Fathima, an alumna of Film and Television Institute of India, has also worked as professor and head of department of cinematography at SRFTI and has directed the short film Infected that screened at Busan International Film Festival. Fowzia is the founder of “ Indian Women Cinematographers Collective" connecting most practicing professionals in the country today, a forum that functions as a peer group to share experiences and lead founded 2017.

== Career ==
Started career as an assistant to P.C. Sreeram, Fowzia made her debut as an independent cameraperson with the Revathi directed film Mitr, My Friend, along with an all-female technical crew. Fowzia is also the first ever independent woman cinematographer in Malayalam cinema as well as the force behind Indian Women Cinematographers' collective.

== Filmography ==
=== As director of photography ===
Year	Film	Language	Notes
2002	Mitr, My Friend	English	
2002	Ivan	Tamil	
2003	Kucch To Hai	Hindi	
2003	Whistle	Tamil	
2004	In the Shadow of the Cobra	English	
2006	Uyir	Tamil	
2008	Silandhi	Tamil	
2009	Mudhal Mudhal Mudhal Varai	Tamil	
2009	Gulumaal: The Escape	Malayalam	
2012	Choker Paani	Bengali	Docu-feature
2013	Infected	Hindi	
2015	Aggedu Nayaga	Malayalam	Short Film-Kerala state Television Award for best Cinematography
2024	Qadeesso	Malayalam	
2025	Train	Tamil	

=== Direction and cinematography ===
Year	Film	Details
2017	Nadiyude Moonaam Kara	Malayalam Fiction 62 Minutes
