= Shyla Lopez =

Indian model and actress

- Occupations: Model, actress
- Years active: 1992–2007
- Spouse: Vladislav Vershinin (m. 2006)
- Children: 1

Shyla Lopez is an Indian former actress, model and beauty pageant titleholder.

== Career ==
Shyla Lopez from Bengaluru won the Femina Miss India 1992 contest. She also won Femina Miss India Bangalore and represented India at the Miss World contest in 1992, which was held at Sun City in South Africa.

She shot for several music videos including Ladki Ban Than Ke Nikli, Meri Soni, Aa Jaane Jaa, Someday, Baahon Mein Chale Aao, Aaja Piya and I Love You. She appeared in photographer Sumeet Chopra's 2003 calendar and starred in a Wheel detergent advertisement alongside Govinda. She played a teacher in the 2006 Tamil film Boys and Girls (2006) alongside Govinda's nephew Arjun Singh, who played a student.

After being a model for more than ten years, she announced her exit from the industry after Vladislav Vershinin, an investment banker from Moscow in 2006. Despite announcing her exit, she still represented India at the Miss World contest in 2007. As of 2007, she had a son named Alexander.

== Filmography ==
=== Music videos ===
Year	Title	Composer(s)	Singer(s)	Performer(s)	Album / Film	Ref.
1995	Ladki Ban Than Ke Nikli		Baba Sehgal			
2000	Meri Soni		Shaan			
2001	Aa Jaane Jaa	Instant Karma			Dance Masti Forever	
2003	Someday	Sandeep Chowta	Leslie Lewis, Anuradha Sriram	Madhu Sapre, Marc Robinson	Dum	
2003	Baahon Mein Chale Aao	Ehsaan Noorani, Farhad Wadia, Instant Karma, Loy Mendonsa, R. D. Burman	Instant Karma, Mahalakshmi Iyer	Shahwar Ali	Dance Masti	
2004	Aaja Piya	Instant Karma			Best Of Dance Masti	

=== Film ===
Year	Film	Role	Language
2006	Boys and Girls	Simran	Tamil
