= Sangeetha Krish =

Indian actress

- Born: Sangeetha Santharam; 21 October 1978 (age 47); Chennai, Tamil Nadu, India
- Other names: Rasika (Malayalam film industry); Deepthi (Kannada film industry)
- Occupations: Actress, dancer, television presenter
- Years active: 1995–present
- Spouse: Krish (m. 2009)
- Children: 1
- Honours: Kalaimamani (2020)

Sangeetha Krish (née Santharam) is an Indian actress, dancer and television presenter who predominantly appears in Tamil, Telugu, Malayalam films and few Kannada films. Debuted in the mid 90s, Sangeetha is best known for her performances in the films Khadgam (2002), Pithamagan (2003), Uyir (2006), Dhanam (2008), Manmadan Ambu (2010), Masooda (2022) and Varisu (2023). Sangeetha is a recipient of two Filmfare Awards South and a Tamil Nadu State Film Award.

== Early life ==
Sangeetha was born in Chennai, India, to Santharam and Bhanumathi. Her grandfather, K. R. Balan, is a film producer, who had produced more than 20 Tamil films. Also her father had produced several films. She has two brothers. She studied at St. John's English School and Junior College, Besant Nagar, Chennai. Sangeetha is a Bharatanatyam dancer as she had learned Bharatanatyam during her school days.

== Career ==
=== Film ===
She started her acting career in the late 1990s under the name Rasika, beginning in an unreleased film opposite her cousin Venkat Prabhu titled Poonjolai. Her debut release was the big-budget Malayalam political thriller, Gangotri (1997). She subsequently played small roles in successful films like Summer in Bethlehem (1998) and Kaadhale Nimmadhi (1998). She was cast as a second heroine in the Mammootty-starrer Ezhupunna Tharakan (1999) and Dileep starrer Deepasthambham Mahaashcharyam (1999). In the 2000s, she changed her stage name to birth name Sangeetha and played lead and supporting roles. She also earned a small role in the Mohanlal-starrer Sradha (2000). Her supporting roles in Khadgam (2002) and Pithamagan (2003) earned her Filmfare Awards in Telugu and Tamil. She then debuted in Kannada films alongside of Dr. Vishnuvardhan in Janani janmabhumi (1997) and later acted alongside Sudeep in Nalla (2004).

=== Television ===
She was a judge on Vijay TV's hit show Jodi No.1. She was one of the three judges along with Silambarasan and Sundaram in Jodi No.1 Season Two, with S. J. Suryaah and Sundaram in Jodi No.1 Season Three, and with Jeeva and Aishwarya Dhanush in Jodi No.1 Season Four.

She was a guest judge during the finals of Vasantham Central's Indian dance competition "Dhool" held in Singapore in 2008. She was the anchor of Enga Veetu Mapillai show in Colors Tamil. And also she is a guest jude in Dhee and Jabardasth and she is hosted Bindaas game show for few episodes in Zee telugu

== Personal life ==
She married film playback singer Krish in 2009 at the Arunachaleshwarar Temple in Tiruvannamalai. The couple has a daughter.

== Filmography ==
| Year | Title | Role | Language | Notes |
|---|---|---|---|---|
| 1997 | Gangothri | Gopika | Malayalam | |
| 1997 | Aattuvela | Malu | Malayalam | |
| 1997 | Circus Sattipandu | | Telugu | |
| 1997 | Ee Hrudaya Ninagagi | Nirmala Mary/Priyadarshani | Kannada | |
| 1997 | Janani Janmabhumi | Shanthi | Kannada | |
| 1998 | Vajra | | Kannada | |
| 1998 | Kaadhale Nimmadhi | Swapna | Tamil | |
| 1998 | Udhavikku Varalaamaa | Stella | Tamil | |
| 1998 | Bhagavath Singh | Kosal/Kokila | Tamil | |
| 1998 | Summer in Bethlehem | Jyothi | Malayalam | |
| 1999 | Deepasthambham Mahascharyam | Priya | Malayalam | |
| 1999 | Guest House | Preethi | Tamil | |
| 1999 | Asala Sandadi | | Telugu | |
| 1999 | Anbulla Kadhalukku | Priya | Tamil | |
| 1999 | English Medium | Radhika | Malayalam | |
| 1999 | Ezhupunna Tharakan | Aishwarya | Malayalam | |
| 2000 | Doubles | Sangeetha | Tamil | |
| 2000 | Sradha | Janeesha | Malayalam | |
| 2000 | Varnakkazhchakal | Susan | Malayalam | |
| 2000 | Chillaksharangal | Sumithra | Malayalam | |
| 2000 | Ingane Oru Nilapakshi | Sangeetha | Malayalam | |
| 2000 | Kannule Kaasu Kaattappa | | Tamil | |
| 2001 | Kabadi Kabadi | Mythili | Tamil | |
| 2001 | Uthaman | Devika | Malayalam | |
| 2001 | Navvuthu Bathakalira | Jayamma | Telugu | Credited as Deepti |
| 2001 | Maa Ayana Sundarayya | Srisha | Telugu | |
| 2002 | Khadgam | Seethalakshmi | Telugu | Filmfare Best Supporting Actress Award (Telugu); CineMAA Award for Best Supporting Actress |
| 2002 | Shambho Mahadeva | Pooja Varma | Malayalam | Unreleased |
| 2003 | Pellam Oorelithe | Sandhya | Telugu | |
| 2003 | Ee Abbai Chala Manchodu | Jeevitha | Telugu | |
| 2003 | Bangalore Bandh | | Kannada | |
| 2003 | Aayudam | Kalyani | Telugu | |
| 2003 | Ori Nee Prema Bangaram Kaanu | Sangita | Telugu | |
| 2003 | Pithamagan | Gomathi | Tamil | Filmfare Best Supporting Actress Award (Tamil); Tamil Nadu State Film Award for Best Supporting Actress |
| 2003 | Nenu Pelliki Ready | Priya | Telugu | |
| 2003 | Tiger Harischandra Prasad | Swathi | Telugu | |
| 2004 | Maa Intikoste Em Testaaru-Mee Intikoste Em Istaaru | Haarika Madhav | Telugu | |
| 2004 | Kushi Kushiga | Satya Bhama | Telugu | |
| 2004 | Nalla | Preethi | Kannada | |
| 2004 | Vijayendra Varma | Journalist | Telugu | |
| 2005 | Sankranthi | Kalyani | Telugu | Nominated – Filmfare Award for Best Supporting Actress – Telugu |
| 2005 | Naa Oopiri | Gowri Venu | Telugu | |
| 2005 | Adirindayya Chandram | Padmavathy (Paddu) | Telugu | |
| 2006 | Uyir | Arundhathi Sathya | Tamil | |
| 2006 | Kasu | Prarthana | Tamil | |
| 2006 | 47A Besant Nagar Varai | Rashika | Tamil | |
| 2007 | Bahumati | Bhanumathi Venkataramana | Telugu | |
| 2007 | Evano Oruvan | Vathsala Vasudevan | Tamil | |
| 2008 | Kaalai | Lakshmi | Tamil | |
| 2008 | Maa Ayana Chanti Pilladu | Chintamani | Telugu | |
| 2008 | Nepali | Herself | Tamil | Cameo appearance |
| 2008 | Magic Lamp | Alphonsa | Malayalam | |
| 2008 | Nayagan | Dr. Sandhya Viswanath | Tamil | |
| 2008 | Dhanam | Dhanam Anantharaman | Tamil | |
| 2008 | Indrajeet | Siri | Telugu | |
| 2009 | Naan Avanillai 2 | Mahalakshmi | Tamil | |
| 2009 | Mathiya Chennai | Film heroine | Tamil | |
| 2010 | Srimathi Kalyanam | Swetha / Sita | Telugu | |
| 2010 | Kutti Pisasu | Gayathri | Tamil | Trilingual film |
| 2010 | Cara Majaka | Gayathri | Telugu | Trilingual film |
| 2010 | Bombat Car | Gayathri | Kannada | Trilingual film |
| 2010 | Puthran | Devaki | Tamil | |
| 2010 | Manmadan Ambu | Deepa | Tamil | Nominated – Filmfare Best Supporting Actress Award (Tamil); Nominated – Vijay Award for Best Supporting Actress |
| 2010 | Thambikottai | Beeda Pandiamma | Tamil | |
| 2011 | Uchithanai Muharnthaal | Nirmala Nadesan | Tamil | |
| 2013 | Vanakkam Chennai | Lawyer Girija | Tamil | Guest appearance |
| 2015 | Massu Engira Masilamani | Principal S. Shankari | Tamil | Guest appearance |
| 2017 | Mupparimanam | Herself | Tamil | Guest appearance |
| 2017 | Neruppu Da | Annam | Tamil | |
| 2020 | Sarileru Neekevvaru | Swarajyam | Telugu | |
| 2021 | Kutty Story | Eve | Tamil | |
| 2021 | Telangana Devudu | | Telugu | |
| 2022 | Acharya | Dancer | Telugu | Guest appearance |
| 2022 | Masooda | Neelam | Telugu | SIIMA Award for Best Supporting Actress – Telugu; Nominated – Filmfare Award for Best Supporting Actress – Telugu |
| 2023 | Varisu | Aarthi | Tamil | |
| 2023 | Tamilarasan | Padma Srinivasan | Tamil | |
| 2025 | Paradha | Rathnamma | Telugu | |
| 2026 | Bail | Haasini | Kannada | |

=== Television ===
- Jodi No.1 (2008)
- Dance Jodi Dance (2022)
- Super Jodi (2023)
