= Arjun Chakravarthy =

2024 Indian Telugu-language sports biographical drama film

Arjun Chakravarthy: Journey of an Unsung Champion
- Theatrical release poster
- Directed by: Vikrant Rudra
- Written by: Vikrant Rudra
- Produced by: Srini Gubbala
- Starring: Vijaya Rama Raju; Sija Rose; Ajay; Ajay Ghosh
- Cinematography: Jagadeesh Cheekati
- Edited by: Pradeep Nandan
- Music by: Vignesh Baskaran
- Release dates: 2024 (film festival); 29 August 2025 (India)
- Running time: 141 minutes
- Country: India
- Language: Telugu

Arjun Chakravarthy: Journey of an Unsung Champion is a 2024 Indian Telugu-language biographical sports drama film written and directed by Vikrant Rudra. It stars Vijaya Rama Raju in the titular role alongside Sija Rose, Ajay and Ajay Ghosh.

The film is based on the life of Kabaddi player Nagulayya from Nalgonda, Telangana and is set between 1980 and 1996. It was released theatrically on 29 August 2025.

== Plot ==
Arjun Chakravarthy, an orphan raised by former kabaddi player Rangaiah, aspires to represent India in the sport. Despite his talent and dedication, he faces systemic neglect, personal heartbreak, and his own descent into alcoholism. The narrative portrays his struggles, his relationship with Devika, and the challenges of balancing ambition with personal life.

== Cast ==
- Vijaya Rama Raju as Arjun Chakravarthy
- Sija Rose as Devika
- Ajay as Kulkarni
- Ajay Ghosh as Sheshadri Sharma
- Dayanand Reddy as Rangayya
- Durgesh as Ramana
- Harsh Roshan

== Release and reception ==
The film premiered at various film festivals in 2024 before being released theatrically on 29 August 2025.

The Times of India rated it 3/5, noting strong technical work but predictable narrative turns. The Hindu felt that the film "tries too hard" to balance commercial drama with realism. OTTPlay described it as "a familiar sports drama elevated by heart and conviction".

Following this, the movie was later released on Lionsgate Play and Amazon Prime Video on 7 October 2025 and also released on ETV Win on 27 November 2025.
