= Enga Amma Rani =

2017 Indian film by S. Bani

- Poster
- Directed by: S. Bani
- Produced by: C. Muthukrishnan
- Starring: Dhansika; Varnika; Varsha
- Cinematography: A. Kumaran; SR Santhoshkumar
- Edited by: A. L. Ramesh
- Music by: Ilaiyaraaja
- Production company: MK Films
- Release date: 5 May 2017
- Country: India
- Language: Tamil

Enga Amma Rani (transl. Our mother is a queen) is a 2017 Indian Tamil-language horror film directed by S. Bani. The film stars Dhansika, Yoganathan Maniam (Malaysia), Varnika, and Varsha, while Shankar Srihari, Anil Murali, and Namo Narayana play supporting roles. The film's score and soundtrack were composed by Ilaiyaraaja. The film released on 5 May 2017.

== Plot ==
In Malaysia, Thulasi, a single mother, lives with her twin daughters Meera and Tara. Her husband Sathya is missing, and she cannot return to India. Caught between financial and visa issues, Thulasi decides to work in a grocery store. One day, Tara suddenly dies. Dr. Murali tells Thulasi that her daughter had Long QT syndrome, and she learns that Meera is diagnosed with the same illness.

Thulasi takes Meera to a hill station, where she starts behaving mysteriously. Thulasi soon learns that Meera is possessed by a spirit. The spirit was a girl who once resided in the hotel with her father. Once, her father received a lump sum for making a profit, which his friend Rajan found out. Rajan blackmailed the father by saying that he had kidnapped his daughter. Her father unknowingly gave the blackmailer the money without knowing who the blackmailer was. He told Rajan the same, oblivious that the latter was the blackmailer. The father tells Rajan that he is going to make a complaint. Rajan suggests that the father not do so, but the latter proceeds, while having lunch with his only daughter. Unknown to him and his daughter, the food is mixed with poison. Rajan brings a local gang and makes the murder look like a suicide, and the spirit narrates to Thulasi in the midst.

Thulasi learns that if the spirit stays in her daughter's body, her daughter will survive, so she pleads for the spirit to stay, and even the spirit agrees. However, Rajan learns of this. He goes to kill Thulasi and Meera but slips from the cliff. The spirit apologizes, as this was her wish, and thus leaves Thulasi's body. Thulasi wants to see her daughter live, so she calls Murali and asks him to take Meera to India and leave her in her hometown. She says she will soon leave everything and then commits suicide so that, as a spirit, she can enter her body to save her from her disease.

== Cast ==
- Dhansika as Thulasi
- Varnika as Meera
- Varsha as Tara
- Namo Narayana as Chokkalingam
- Shankar Srihari as Dr. Murali
- Anil Murali as Rajan
- Manoj Kumar as Sathya's father
- Rindhu Ravi as Sathya's mother
- Vaishali Thaniga as Durga Devi
- Nitish Veera
- Rindhu Ravi
- Meena Karthik
- VIP Krishna
- Sujatha Thanika
- Yoganathan Maniam in Cameo role

== Production ==
Director S. Bani had worked as an assistant to Samuthirakani, and the location of the film is Malaysia.

== Soundtrack ==
Lyrics written by Palani Bharathi.

1. "Amma Endru" - Anitha Karthikeyan, Aala
2. "Va Va Magale" - Rajashree Pathak

== Reception ==
Deccan Chronicle gave the film a rating of two out of five stars and wrote that "Overall, Enga Amma Rani is a sincere attempt by Bani. The defects can be overlooked as the team has clearly put in a lot of passion behind this project". The Times of India gave the film the same rating and noted that " Instead, he gives us a very conventional ghost story that is lacking in both surprises and scares".
