= G. Sasikumar =

Indian film editor

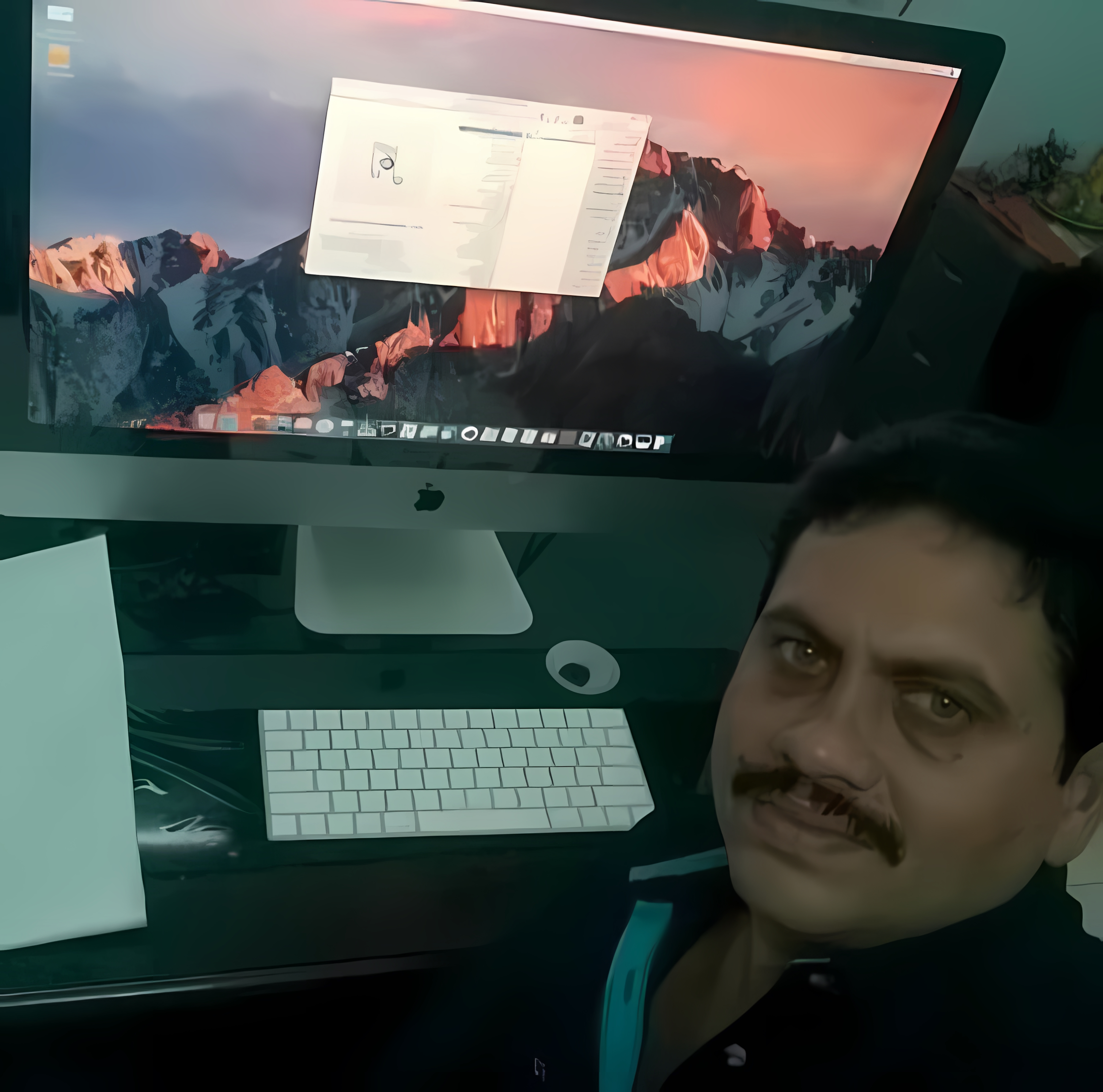
- Born: India
- Occupation: Film editor
- Years active: 2004–present

G. Sasikumar is an Indian film editor, who has worked on predominantly Tamil-language films.

== Career ==
G. Sasikumar made his debut with Kaadhal (2004) also featuring other newcomers as part of the crew: music director Joshua Sridhar and art director K. Veerasamar. He worked on films such as Uyir (2006) and Idhu Kadhal Varum Paruvam (2006) before garnering acclaim for his work in the horror thriller Sivi (2007), which was a remake of the Thai film Shutter (2004). Regarding his work in the film, one critic wrote that "Seamless and taut editing by Sasikumar spices up the terror quotient of the film" while another critic wrote that "A pat on the back to the editor for some slick work".

== Filmography ==
- Kaadhal (2004)
- December (2005; Malayalam)
- Bambara Kannaley (2005)
- Sandakozhi (2005)
- Imsai Arasan 23rd Pulikecei (2006)
- Kalvanin Kadhali (2006)
- Uyir (2006)
- Azhagai Irukkirai Bayamai Irukkirathu (2006)
- Thiruvilaiyaadal Aarambam (2006)
- Idhu Kadhal Varum Paruvam (2006)
- Malaikottai (2007)
- Deepavali (2007)
- Sabari (2007)
- Nam Naadu (2007)
- Sivi (2007)
- Kalloori (2007)
- Pidichirukku (2008)
- Sandai (2008)
- Kannum Kannum (2008)
- Arai En 305-il Kadavul (2008)
- Arjunan Kadhali (TBA)
- TN 07 AL 4777 (2008)
- Pattalam (2009)
- Brahma Deva (2009)
- Guru Sishyan (2010)
- Sindhu Samaveli (2010)
- Ochayee (2010)
- Aayiram Vilakku (2011)
- Vinmeengal (2012)
- Sutrula (2014)
- Kalai Vendhan (2015)
- Agathinai (2015)
- Tharai Thappattai (2016)
- Pakka (2018)
- Charlie Chaplin 2 (2019)
- Kodai (2023)
- Rayar Parambarai (2023)
- Yogi Da (2026)
- Asurakulam (TBA)
