= Kalaiyarasan =

Indian actor (born 1986)

- Born: Kalaiyarasan Harikrishnan; 20 February 1986 (age 40); Madras, Tamil Nadu, India
- Occupation: Actor
- Years active: 2010–present
- Spouse: Shanmuga Priya

Kalaiyarasan Harikrishnan (born 20 February 1986) is an Indian actor, who works in the Tamil film industry along with few Malayalam films. He has collaborated with directors Mysskin and Pa. Ranjith, with whom he worked in Madras (2014) for which he received acclaim for his performance.

== Career ==
=== 2010-2013: Debut and early work ===
Kalaiyarasan, a graduate in Computer Applications from SRM Institute of Science and Technology, initially began work as an actor with Parthy Bhaskar's Arjunan Kadhali in 2010, but the film remains unreleased. He then worked with director Mysskin on two ventures, Nandalala (2010) and Mugamoodi (2012), and credits the film maker as his mentor. He also played small role in Ranjith's directorial debut Attakathi (2012), playing the suitor to the heroine, as well as in Vikram Sugumaran's Madha Yaanai Koottam (2013).

=== 2014-2019: Breakthrough and success ===
Kalaiyarasan's breakthrough as an actor came through his performance in Ranjith's drama film Madras (2014), where he portrayed the pivotal role of Anbu. Set in the backdrop of North Chennai, Kalaiyarasan auditioned and cleared three screen tests before being handed the role and worked closely with the film's lead actor Karthi in order to show their on-screen camaraderie. Upon release in September 2014, the film became a commercial and critical acclaimed success, while Kalaiyarasan's portrayal won unanimous praise. A critic from Behindwoods.com noted Kalaiyarasan "steals the show and this has to be his lifetime role", adding that "the youngster has grabbed the opportunity with both hands and we have to laud director Ranjith for giving this dynamic performer good scope to showcase his wares". Similarly Sify.com added that his performance is "riveting" and that "his body language and dialogue delivery in almost a parallel role is terrific."

Following the success of Madras, Kalaiyarasan's career in the Tamil film industry took off and garnered him higher-profile films as well as lead roles. Ranjith cast him again in a pivotal supporting role in the Rajinikanth-starrer Kabali (2016), as a school teacher with a vengeance against Rajinikanth's titular character. The film opened to positive reviews for Kalaiyarasan and subsequently went on to become the highest grossing Tamil film of all time. He first portrayed leading roles in Darling 2 (2016) and Raja Manthiri (2016), but his first high-profile project as the protagonist was C. V. Kumar's production Adhe Kangal (2017). Featuring alongside Janani and Sshivada, Kalaiyarasan portrayed a blind chef, with the makers using American chef Christine Hà as a character inspiration for his role. The film opened to positive reviews, with critics praising his portrayal of the character. Kalaiyarasan has a series of solo lead films ready for release in 2017, including Yeidhavan and Uru. He was also be seen in Kaalakkoothu (2018) alongside Prasanna. He has played in lead roles in thrillers films such as Pattinapakkam (2018) and Kalavu (2019).

=== 2021-present ===
He was starred with Dhanush in Karthik Subbaraj's Jagame Thandhiram (2021) released on June 18 on Netflix. He has collobored with Pa. Ranjith's in Sarpatta Parambarai (2021), Natchathiram Nagargiradhu (2022) as well as in the web series Victim (2022). He was also seen in Malayalam films Thankam (2023), 2018 (2023) and Charles Enterprises (2023). He was cast in Tamil drama film Mari Selvaraj's Vaazhai (2024) and received positive reviews and strong box office performance. He also acted in Telegu movie Devara: Part 1 (2024). He played with R. Sarathkumar in the web series Cheran's Journey (2024) and the thriller film The Smile Man (2024). Later, he was cast in action film Madraskaaran (2025) followed by two thrillers Trending (2025) and Thandakaaranyam (2025).

== Personal life ==
Kalaiyarasan is married to Shanmuga Priya, whom he met at Accenture, his first place of employment.

== Filmography ==
=== As actor ===
Key
| † | Denotes films that have not yet been released |

| Year | Title | Role | Notes | Ref |
|---|---|---|---|---|
| 2010 | Nandalala | Drunkard | | |
| 2012 | Attakathi | Dinakaran | | |
| 2012 | Mugamoodi | Viji | | |
| 2013 | Madha Yaanai Koottam | Boologaraasa | | |
| 2014 | Madras | Anbu | Vijay Award for Best Supporting Actor; Nominated, Filmfare Award for Best Supporting Actor – Tamil; Nominated, SIIMA Award for Best Tamil Supporting Actor | |
| 2015 | Darling | Shiva | | |
| 2015 | Urumeen | John Christopher | | |
| 2016 | Darling 2 | Aravind | | |
| 2016 | Raja Manthiri | Karthik | | |
| 2016 | Kabali | Tamizh Kumaran | | |
| 2017 | Adhe Kangal | Varun | | |
| 2017 | Mupparimanam | Himself | Cameo appearance | |
| 2017 | Yeidhavan | Krishna | | |
| 2017 | Uru | Jeevan | | |
| 2018 | Thaanaa Serndha Koottam | Iniyan's friend | | |
| 2018 | Kaalakkoothu | Hari | | |
| 2018 | Pattinapakkam | Vetri | | |
| 2019 | Kalavu | Sujeeth | | |
| 2019 | Airaa | Amudhan | | |
| 2021 | Jagame Thanthiram | Deepan | | |
| 2021 | Sarpatta Parambarai | Vetriselvan | | |
| 2021 | Laabam | Benny | | |
| 2021 | Udanpirappe | Adhiban | | |
| 2022 | Kuthiraivaal | Saravanan | | |
| 2022 | Natchathiram Nagargiradhu | Arjun | | |
| 2022 | Kalaga Thalaivan | Gandhi | | |
| 2022 | Estate | Sasi | | |
| 2023 | Thankam | Abbas | Malayalam film | |
| 2023 | Pathu Thala | Ameer | | |
| 2023 | Burqa | Surya | | |
| 2023 | 2018 | Sethupathy | Malayalam film | |
| 2023 | Karungaapiyam | Shakthi | | |
| 2023 | Charles Enterprises | Charles | Malayalam film | |
| 2024 | Hot Spot | Ezhumalai | segment: "Fame Game" | |
| 2024 | Vaazhai | Kani | SIIMA Award for Best Actor in a Supporting Role | |
| 2024 | Devara: Part 1 | Kunjara | Telugu film | |
| 2024 | The Smile Man | Prabhu | | |
| 2025 | Madraskaaran | Singam | | |
| 2025 | Trending | Arjun | | |
| 2025 | Thandakaaranyam | Murugan | | |
| 2026 | Kolaiseval | Kaali | | |
| 2026 | Moondram Kan | Mechanic | | |
| 2026 | Itllu Arjuna | Gowri | Telugu film | |
| 2026 | Titanic | Surya | | |

=== As dubbing artist ===
| Year | Film | Actor | Notes |
|---|---|---|---|
| 2019 | Petta | Nawazuddin Siddiqui | Flash back portions only |
| 2023 | 800 | Madhur Mittal | For the role of Muthiah Muralitharan |

=== Web series ===
| Year | Program Name | Role | Network | Notes | Ref. |
|---|---|---|---|---|---|
| 2022 | Victim | Sekar | SonyLIV | | |
| 2022 | Pettaikaali | Pandi | Aha Tamil | | |
| 2023 | Sengalam | Rayar | ZEE5 | | |
| 2024 | Cheran's Journey | Ameer Sulthan | SonyLIV | | |
| 2025 | Nadu Center | Vetri | JioHotstar | | |

=== Short film ===
- Magavu
