= Soorya Kireedam =

- Directed by: George Kithu
- Written by: Deepu Karulaay
- Produced by: Big Ben Films International
- Starring: Nishanth Sagar; Shammi Thilakan; Ramya Nambeesan; Indrajith Sukumaran; Nithya Das; Alexander Prasanth
- Cinematography: Sree Shankar
- Edited by: K. Rajagopal
- Music by: Bennight Vithrag; Rajamani(Background Score)
- Distributed by: Emil and Erik Release
- Release date: April 30, 2007
- Country: India
- Language: Malayalam

Soorya Kireedam is a 2007 Indian Malayalam language horror film. It was released in 2007, starring Nishanth Sagar,Shammi Thilakan, Ramya Nambeesan in lead roles with Indrajith Sukumaran, Nithya Das and Alexander Prasanth.It is part of the Soorya Trilogy

== Plot ==
An exorcist arrives to save a young girl who is seemingly possessed by a ghost. A young girl begins to behave strangely and displays mysterious powers. This leads her family to believe that she has been possessed by an evil spirit. As things begin to get more dangerous, an exorcist enters. Will he get rid of the ghost or is there something stronger at work?

== Cast ==
- Nishanth Sagar as Goutham
- Shammi Thilakan as Vishnu Narayanan
- Remya Nambeesan as Pooja, Goutham's best boy friend
- Indrajith Sukumaran as Shivaraman, a black magican and The main antagonist
- Nithya Das as Urmila
- Alexander Prasanth as Vivek
- Mammukkoya as Babychan
- Lishoy as Anandan
- Deepika Mohan as Madhavi
- Santhakumari as Januamma
- Meenal as Ashwathy
- Sandra Amy as Merlin, Pooja's friend
- Vijay Menon as Dr. Venu
- Subair as Vishwanatha Menon, Pooja's father
- V. K. Sreeraman as Prabhakaran
- Unni Shishuapal as Jayakrishnan
- Shaalin Zoya as Jr. Urmila
