= Dhakshina (film) =

- Theatrical release poster
- Directed by: Tulsi Ram Osho
- Written by: Soni Raj Sonu; Tulsi Ram Osho
- Screenplay by: Tulsi Ram Osho
- Produced by: Ashok Shinde
- Starring: Sai Dhanshika; Rishav Basu; Sneha Singh
- Cinematography: Ramakrishna Sanapathi
- Edited by: Vinay
- Music by: DSR
- Production company: Cult Concepts
- Distributed by: Mythri Movie Makers
- Release date: 4 October 2024
- Country: India
- Language: Telugu

Dhakshina is a 2024 Telugu-language crime action drama film directed by Tulasi Ram Osho and produced by Ashok Shinde, under the banner of Cult Concepts. The film stars Sai Dhanshika in the titular role, with Rishav Basu, Sneha Singh, Ankitha Muler, Hima Sailaja, Magna Choudhary, Karuna, and Naveen playing supporting roles.

== Plot ==
A man (Rishav Basu) kidnaps a girl and kills her. A question mark is drawn with blood in place of victim's missing head. The media quotes the killer as Question Mark Killer. The police start to investigate under the lead of Sneha Singh. Dakshina (Sai Dhanshika) also investigates the murder and visits the Victim's house. The killer sends the victim's head in a gift box to victim's house through a drug addict. Dakshina and the police interrogate the drug addict separately and the drug addict explains that an old man with a missing arm asked to deliver the box. Dakshina saves a girl from a group of thugs. Another girl is killed in the same pattern. Car Accident happens to Dakshina while Dakshina was chasing after the old man from the crime scene.

Flashback: Initially, Dakshina was the lead officer of the question mark killer. The killer sets up a bait to confuse the police and kidnaps and kills another girl with the help of the old man. The killer drugs Dakshina and records a video of himself sexually assaulting her. As the video goes viral, Dakshina resigns from her job and sets her house on fire.

Dakshina gains consciousness at the hospital after recovering from the accident. Dakshina explains about what she found about the killer to Sneha Singh with another flashback. The old man is revealed to be the father of the killer. Another girl is killed in the same pattern. The old man tries to kill Sneha Singh but Dakshina intervenes. Dakshina captures the old man and finds the location of the killer. The killer disguised as a woman kills another girl and kills Sneha Singh. Dakshina kills the old man and captures the killer. Dakshina fights and kills the killer.

== Cast ==
- Sai Dhanshika as Dakshina
- Rishav Basu
- Sneha Singh
- Hima Sailaja
- Magna Choudhary
- Karuna
- Naveen
- Ankitha

== Production ==
The production of Dhakshina was spearheaded by Tulsi Ram Osho, with Ashok Shinde as producer and Soni Raj Sonu as writer. Dialogues for the film were penned by Veligonda Srinivas. Ramakrishna Sanapathi handled the cinematography, while Vinay handled the editing and the original musical score was produced by DSR. The trailer of this film was launched by Buchi Babu Sana.

== Release ==
=== Theatrical ===
Dhakshina was released worldwide on 4 October 2024.

=== Home media ===
Dhakshina is available for streaming on Lionsgate Play

=== Distribution ===
This film's distribution rights were acquired by Mythri Movie Makers for the Nizam region.

== Reception ==
Film got neutral reviews, most notable sites like, Telugu Rajyam, Samayam, Hindustan Times, Filmy Focus, Zee News, issued a 2 out of 5 for this film
