= Idhu Kadhal Varum Paruvam =

- Poster
- Directed by: Kasthuri Raja
- Written by: Kasthuri Raja
- Produced by: K. Karthika Devi
- Starring: Arish Kumar; Prete Bhutani; Lakshmi Priya
- Cinematography: Rajarajan; R.Tamilvanan
- Edited by: G. Sasikumar
- Music by: Kasthuri Raja
- Production company: R. K. Productions Pvt. Ltd
- Distributed by: Sri Thenandal Films
- Release date: 1 December 2006
- Country: India
- Language: Tamil

Idhu Kadhal Varum Paruvam (transl. This is the age of love) is a 2006 Indian Tamil-language coming-of-age film directed by Kasthuri Raja. The film stars several newcomers including Arish Kumar, Prete Bhutani and Lakshmi Priya alongside Kiran Rathod. It chronicles the coming-of-age of a teenager who is a school student. The film was released on 1 December 2006. As of 2026, it is the last film directed by Kasthuri Raja.

== Plot ==
Surya, the school-going 15-year old boy finds himself attracted to his classmate Raji. Later he gets infatuated with a model Manasi. Finally, his lust grows for a call girl Swarna. As Swarna's husband is a pimp, she also shows some interest towards Surya. Surya and Swarna elope. But towards the end Swarna turns to preach. She advises Surya to be a good role model student and also to return to his parents.

== Cast ==
- Arish Kumar as Surya
- Prete Bhutani as Swarna
- Lakshmi Priya
- Kiran Rathod as Manasi
- Baba Bhaskar as Ajees
- Karunas

== Production ==
The songs were shot in places including Rameswaram, Kumbakkarai, Visakhapatnam, Kodaikkanal, Manjalaru Anai and Theni.

== Soundtrack ==
Kasthuri Raja made his debut as music composer with this film and also wrote lyrics for all songs.

Track listing
| No. | Title | Singer(s) | Length |
|---|---|---|---|
| 1. | "Yugam Yugamai" | Aishwarya Kishore |
| 2. | "Sollamal Mudivatha" | Prasanna |
| 3. | "15 Vayasu" | Nitish Gopalan, Lavanya |
| 4. | "Paada Paduthum" | Jayadev, Padmalatha |
| 5. | "Kanja Adikalada" | Jayadev |
| 6. | "Kadhal Kadhal" | Nitish Gopalan, Anuradha Sriram |

== Release and reception ==
The film was released on 1 December 2006. Malini Mannath from Chennai Online wrote that "The message if any, is wasted again, as [Kasthuri Raja's] target-audience (?) would be nowhere in the theatre". Sify wrote, "[Kasthuri Raja] once again takes his usual route of sex, smut and sleaze with Ithu Kathal Varum Paruvam which looks more like a soft-porn movie".
