= Arputham =

- DVD cover
- Directed by: Arputhan
- Written by: Arpudhan
- Produced by: R. B. Choudary
- Starring: Raghava Lawrence; Kunal; Anu Prabhakar
- Cinematography: Shree
- Edited by: V. Jaishankar
- Music by: Shiva
- Production company: Super Good Films
- Release date: 12 September 2002
- Running time: 160 minutes
- Country: India
- Language: Tamil

Arputham is a 2002 Indian Tamil-language romantic drama film directed by Arputhan. The film stars Raghava Lawrence, Kunal and Anu Prabhakar. Arputham merges two concepts in Tamil cinema—the love triangle and the rags-to-riches story.

== Plot ==
Ashok is a good-for-nothing youth spending most of his time with his friends. Despite coming from a middle-class family, Ashok neither has an urge to earn money nor improve the standards of his life. One day, Ashok meets Priya and falls for her impressed by her beauty and character. Ashok proposes Priya and threatens that he would commit suicide if she does not accept his love. Priya, although not interested in Ashok, convinces him saying that he should first achieve something in life and then propose her. This marks a change in Ashok's life. After many attempts, he finally decides to start a mobile fast food restaurant which becomes a good success. Ashok develops his business gradually with the help of financial aid from Arvind who happens to be a bank manager. Actually Arvind and Priya are in love as well which Ashok does not know.

Ashok's business expands into hotels, supermarkets, real estate etc. and he becomes one of the leading businessmen in the city. During an interview for a TV channel, Ashok mentions about his love which has been the driving force behind his success. Priya gets shocked hearing this and informs to Arvind as well as Ashok's friends who promise that they would settle down the issue. However, Arvind and Ashok's friends could not disclose the truth to Ashok fearing that Ashok could still decide ending his life. Ashok builds a bungalow and wants his wedding to happen there. Arvind convinces Priya to marry Ashok. Priya although not interested, agrees to marry Ashok. On the day of wedding, Ashok overhears the conversation between Priya and Arvind and understands all the truth. He cancels his wedding and decides to unite Priya with Arvind. In the end, Priya and Arvind are united. Ashok thanks Priya for making him understand the value of life and become a successful person.

== Cast ==
- Raghava Lawrence as Ashok
- Kunal as Arvind
- Anu Prabhakar as Priya
- Pyramid Natarajan as Ashok's father
- Kalairani as Ashok's mother
- Livingston as Govind
- Vaiyapuri as Ashok's friend
- Dhamu as Arivazhagan
- Lavanya as Vasanthi
- Nanditha
- Mahanadi Shankar

== Production ==
Dance choreographer Lawrence made his lead debut with this film.

== Soundtrack ==
The soundtrack was composed by Shiva, who previously composed for Love Today. The song "Nee Malaraa Malaraa" is based on "Naa Pedaviki" from Snehamante Idera (2001).

| No. | Title | Lyrics | Singer(s) | Length |
|---|---|---|---|---|
| 1. | "Aaha Anandham" | Pa. Vijay | Shankar Mahadevan | 5:15 |
| 2. | "Nee Malaraa Malaraa" | Pa. Vijay | Unni Krishnan & K. S. Chithra | 4:33 |
| 3. | "Pandibazaaril" | Vaigundhavasan | Harish Raghavendra | 5:38 |
| 4. | "Pothunda Pothunda" | Pa. Vijay | Tippu | 5:20 |
| 5. | "Thattu Thattu" | Na. Muthukumar | S. P. Balasubrahmanyam | 4:21 |
| Total length: | | | | 25:07 |

== Reception ==
Malathi Rangarajan from The Hindu wrote that "If you have the patience to sit through the initial segments, the appeal that comes later may have a positive impact". A critic from Sify wrote that "Arputham has a decent screenplay and Lawrence is tolerable". Malini Mannath from Chennai Online wrote that "It is debutant director Arputhan's arrangement of scenes and his thoughtfully written lines in the second half that stand out".
