= Kaalakkoothu =

- Theatrical release poster
- Directed by: M. Nagarajan
- Written by: M. Nagarajan
- Starring: Prasanna; Kalaiyarasan; Dhansika; Srushti Dange
- Cinematography: P. V. Shankar
- Edited by: Selva RK
- Music by: Justin Prabhakaran
- Production company: Madurai Sri Kallalagar Entertainment
- Release date: 25 May 2018
- Running time: 115 minutes
- Country: India
- Language: Tamil

Kaalakkoothu (transl. Antics of time) is a 2018 Indian Tamil language romantic drama film written and directed by M. Nagarajan. The film stars Prasanna, Kalaiyarasan, Dhansika, and Srushti Dange in the leading roles. The music was composed by Justin Prabhakaran with cinematography by P. V. Shankar and editing by Selva RK. The film released on 25 May 2018 to mixed reviews.

== Plot ==
The film opens with a new boy named Easwaran joining Hari's class. Easwaran is instantly disliked because of his withdrawn nature. Hari picks a fight with Easwaran; during the fight, Easwaran breaks Hari's nose, and Hari brings his parents to school. Hari's mother, however, upon learning that Easwaran is an orphan, tells him that he can consider her as his mother. However, in a few days, she dies. At her funeral, Easwaran holds Hari's hand and consoles him.

Years later, Hari (Kalaiyarasan) is in a long-term relationship with a college girl named Gayathri (Dhansika), while a demure girl named Revathi (Srushti Dange) pines for Easwaran (Prasanna), who ignores her as he fears that something bad will happen to her. The two men make a dangerous enemy in the form of a local mayor's son, whom they beat up and break his hands for harassing Hari's sister. Meanwhile, Easwaran accepts Revathi due to Hari's efforts. Just when everything seems to be going fine, Revathi's father sees them together when they return from a short outing.

The next day, Revathi leaves for her native place with her father and informs Easwaran that she will return in four days. Both plan to take their relationship to the next level by having the elders of the family (Hari's father and Revathi's father) meet and arrange their wedding, but when they come four days later, Revathi is married off to someone else and seems to be happy. Easwaran is heartbroken, while Hari is infuriated and drinks to his fullest, which irks Gayathri and makes her leave angrily. The mayor's son demands from his mother that he wants Easwaran dead, to which she agrees.

In the meantime, Gayathri's grandfather is adamant that he wants to see Gayathri engaged to her uncle before his health worsens. The family arranges the engagement for the next day, and the marriage is fixed a month later. Gayathri is worried about her love and informs Hari about the engagement. Gayathri elopes with Hari, and they marry the next day in a temple. Her family starts searching for her. On their first night, they receive a call and rush to Gayathri's home. Her mother has committed suicide, and Gayathri's family members do not allow Gayathri to see her mother even for one last time. Gayathri pleads with her father, but he pushes her, after which she hits her head on the gate and dies. An unconscious Gayathri then sees her uncle and his men beating and killing Hari. While this is happening, Easwaran is coming to Gayathri's house. Along the way, he encounters the mayor's henchmen but subdues them. He arrives to see that both Hari and Gayathri are dead, and is himself killed by the mayor's brother shortly after.

== Cast ==
- Prasanna as Easwaran
- Kalaiyarasan as Hari
- Dhansika as Gayathri
- Srushti Dange as Revathi
- R. N. R. Manohar as Gayathri's father
- Rajyalakshmi as Gayathri's mother
- Pondy Ravi
- Thavasi
- Mahendran
- Jigarthanda Senthil
- Parameswaran
- Rajapandi
- Sudhesh
- Supergood Ganesh
- Madurai Mohan
- Baby
- Meenakshi
- Anand
- Kannan
- Sonamuthu
- Pavithra
- Savithri
- Aishwarya
- Anu

== Production ==
M. Nagarajan began the film in early 2015 with Shaam and Kalaiyarasan signed on to feature in the two leading roles. Shaam began working for the film in May 2015 and grew a beard for his role, before opting out as a result of differences with the director. Consequently, later on in the month, Prasanna was signed on as Shaam's replacement. The film was predominantly shot in Madurai, where the story is set.

== Soundtrack ==
The soundtrack was composed by Justin Prabhakaran.

Track listing
No.	Title	Lyrics	Singer(s)	Length
1.	"Alli Kodiye"	Justin Prabhakaran	Sathyaprakash	04:18
2.	"Engeyo Pogum"	Snehan	Sriram Parthasarathy	05:17
3.	"Jeevan Intha Kaname"	M. Nagarajan	Sathyaprakash, Latha Krishna	01:48
4.	"Kanna Katti"	Kattalai Jaya	Haricharan, Latha Krishna	04:31
5.	"Kannukkulla"	Kattalai Jaya	Sathyaprakash, Sharanya Srinivas	04:22
6.	"Netri Kungumam"	M. Nagarajan, Kattalai Jaya	V. V. Prasanna, Chinmayi	04:14
Total length:				24:30

== Critical reception ==
Sify gave 3/5 and wrote, "Overall, Kaalakkoothu is a predictable drama set in Madurai with the usual revenge angle and tragic ending." M Suganth of The Times of India gave 2/5 stars and wrote, "The problem with Kaalakkoothu is not just the fact that it is a little late to the party, but that its every beat is predictable." Sudhir Srinivasan of Cinema Express wrote, "Kaalakkoothu needed something cleverer, something more imaginative, but in his earnestness to be content with telling the caste-is-bad message, Nagarajan fails to adequately explore the dynamics of the relationships he creates with such involvement." Udhav Naig of The Hindu wrote, "Kaalakkoothu does nothing more than stack up routine, predictable plot points together and unpacks it in an unimaginative manner." Anupama Subramanian of Deccan Chronicle wrote, "Had Nagarajan infused freshness in narration and few exciting elements in screenplay, Kaalakkoothu would have been more interesting." However, she praised Kalaiyarasan's performance and Prabhakaran's background score.
