= Kozhi Koovuthu (2012 film) =

- Theatrical release poster
- Directed by: K I Ranjith
- Starring: Ashok; Shija Rose
- Cinematography: A. Jeyaprakash
- Edited by: L. V. K. Doss
- Music by: E. S. Ramraj
- Production company: V V Films
- Release date: 28 December 2012
- Country: India
- Language: Tamil

Kozhi Koovuthu (transl. The chicken is clucking) is a 2012 Indian Tamil-language romance film directed by K I Ranjith. The film stars Ashok and Shija Rose, while Bose Venkat, Aadukalam Naren, and Rohini play supporting roles. The film released on 28 December 2012.

== Plot ==
Kumaresan and his gang of friends go around villages selling chickens. They cheat the simple villagers into believing that the common chickens they sell are imported breeds. The whole group is happy-go-lucky, and they do not worry much about the future. Thulasi, who is living at her aunt's house after moving away from her father, buys two chicks from Kumaresan. When they end up dead the next day, she corners him and demands an explanation. Kumaresan gives two more chicks as replacement. Later, when a group of villagers tie up Kumaresan and beat him for cheating them by selling them sick chickens, Thulasi saves him from the group. On learning of Kumaresan's family and the hardships that he has faced, she develops a soft corner for him. In due course, this turns to love. Just as everything is progressing smoothly, Thulasi's ruffian uncle whisks her off to her native village for a festival, which later forms the crux of the story.

== Cast ==
- Ashok as Kumaresan
- Sija Rose as Thulasi
- Bose Venkat as Aiyyanar
- Aadukalam Naren
- Rohini as Valliammai
- Sujatha Sivakumar
- Jothi Lakshmi
- Mayilsamy
- Singamuthu
- Theni Murugan
- Rajasimman
- Avan Ivan Ramraj
- Berchmans Prabahar as doctor

== Soundtrack ==
The soundtrack was composed by E. S. Ramraj. The audio launch was held on 17 August 2012.

Track listing
No.	Title	Singer(s)	Length
1.	"Vaadamallikari"	Karthik, Anuradha Sriram
2.	"Saara Paambu"	E. S. Ramraj, H. Priya
3.	"Yaaro Nee"	Shweta Mohan
4.	"Ellarum Otha Saanu"	M. S. Viswanathan, Aneesh V. M.
5.	"Kaatraga En"	Shankar Mahadevan

== Critical reception ==
The Times of India wrote, "It is only thanks to the work put in by the lead pair and character actor Bose Venkat that there is some interest in the proceedings, though the characters and situations are fairly predictable". K. R. Manigandan of The Hindu wrote, "The story is predictable — right from the start till the end — and therefore completely lacks the element of surprise. However, what the movie lacks by way of suspense, it makes up for with neat performances from its cast". Malini Mannath wrote for The New Indian Express, "The director seems to have put in an effort to etch his screenplay fairly neat and the narration has a smooth natural flow. The actors fit in suitably too. But sans any freshness in the plot or treatment, it has little appeal to the audience". Mythili Ramachandran of Gulf News wrote, "Old wine in a new bottle? Yes, to some extent. Yet, debutant director K.I. Ranjith holds viewers’ attention with his neat presentation".
