= Uyir =

- Poster
- Directed by: Samy
- Written by: Samy
- Produced by: R. Balaji; R. Saravana
- Starring: Srikanth; Samvrutha Sunil; Sangeetha
- Cinematography: Fowzia Fathima
- Edited by: G. Sasikumar
- Music by: Joshua Sridhar
- Production company: Sri Balaji Cine Creations
- Release date: 30 June 2006
- Country: India
- Language: Tamil

Uyir (transl. Soul) is a 2006 Indian Tamil-language erotic thriller film written and directed by Samy in his directorial debut. The film stars Srikanth, Samruvtha (in her Tamil debut), and Sangeetha. The film revolves around a woman who falls in love with her brother-in-law after the demise of her husband. The music was composed by Joshua Sridhar with cinematography by Fowzia Fathima and editing by G. Sasikumar. The film was released on 30 June 2006.

== Plot ==
Sundar (Srikanth) moves in with his brother's (Asim Sharma) family, consisting of his brother, sister-in-law Arundathi (Sangeetha), and their daughter Aishwarya. Sundar becomes very close to all three of them, but unbeknownst to him, Arundathi is interested in him. Sundar drops his niece off at school every day and meets his girlfriend Anandhi (Samvrutha Sunil) there. His brother is excited to learn about their relationship but soon afterward commits suicide. Arundathi claims that his suicide was caused by problems at work. Sundar feels obligated to take care of his late brother's family, as Arundathi and Aishwarya have nowhere else to go. Arundathi tries her best to end Sundar's relationship with Anandhi while subtly hinting to Sundar about her love for him. Anandhi tries to warn Sundar about his conniving sister-in-law, but Arundathi succeeds in her plan. Whether Sundar gets together with Anandhi or not constitutes the rest of the plot.

== Cast ==
- Srikanth as Sundar
- Samruvtha as Anandhi
- Sangeetha as Arundathi

The uncredited cast includes Asim Sharma as Sundar's brother and Balaji as Sundar's friend.

== Production ==
The film marked the directorial debut of Samy who earlier assisted S. A. Chandrasekhar and Cheran.

== Soundtrack ==
Soundtrack was composed by Joshua Sridhar.

1. "Convent Sollitharum" - Tippu, Natash, Dhanni
2. "Udhadum Udhadum" - Karthik, Chandni
3. "Aarum Ponnum" - Joshua Sridhar, Mahathi, Shalini
4. "Kann Simittum Nerame" - Haricharan, Shalini, Mahathi
5. "Uyir Theme Music"
6. "Kanne Kadhal Nilame" - Pradeep, Harini

== Reception ==
The Hindu wrote "After a point the end is guessable, yet the treatment is a reiteration of Sami's astuteness. Story, screenplay, dialogue writer and director Sami, you hear, has worked with the likes of Parthiban and Cheran. The positive influence shows". Rediff called it "a lifeless film". Malini Mannath of Chennai Online wrote "What is worth appreciating about 'Uyir' is the director's sincere attempt to offer the viewer a fare different from the routine ones, not taking recourse to overt glamour or vulgarity though there was enough room for the script to be manipulated, and yet give a film that is fairly engaging". Cinesouth wrote "Director Samy can be lauded for accelerating the speed of the film with a very few characters".
