= Nithya Das =

Indian actress

- Born: Kunnamangalam Calicut, Kerala,
- Occupation: Actress
- Spouse: Arvind Singh
- Children: 2

Nithya Das is an Indian actress who works prominently in Malayalam cinema along with Malayalam and Tamil television series.

== Career ==
Das was active in the film industry during the early 2000s. She started her career with the 2001 film Ee Parakkum Thalika, directed by Thaha and starring Dileep. After this successful film, she acted with Kalabhavan Mani in Kanmashi. Her other films in Malayalam include Balettan, Choonda, Hridayathil Sookshikkan, Nagaram, Soorya Kireedam, and Nariman. She was selected from many applicants in a talent search program of the film industry. She acted in television serials on Surya TV, Kairali TV, Sun TV, and Jaya TV. She makes a comeback to the Malayalam film industry after fourteen years through the movie Pallimani, which will be released in 2023.

== Personal life ==
Nithya Das is the younger sister of television actress Brinda Das who portrayed as Abirami in the serial Anandham (TV series). Nithya married Arvind Singh Jamwal when she met him in 2005 while traveling to Chennai on Indian Airlines and Arvind was a member of the flight crew. The couple has two children. Initially, they settled in Kashmir and then moved to Kozhikode.

== Filmography ==
Key
†	Denotes films that have not yet been released

- All films in Malayalam language unless otherwise noted

List of Nithya Das film credits
Year	Title	Role	Notes
2001	Ee Parakkum Thalika	Gayathri Devi / Basanthi	Debut movie Asianet Film Awards – Best New Face of the Year (Female)
2001	Nariman	Sruthi	
2002	Kanmashi	Sethulakshmi/Kanmashi	
2002	Kunjikoonan	Dream wife	Special appearance in a song
2003	Balettan	Devaki	
2003	Varum Varunnu Vannu	Podimol	
2003	Choonda	Anitha	
2004	Kadhavaseshan	Sreedevi	
2004	Maratha Nadu	Shahina	
2004	Freedom	Shalini	
2005	Hridayathil Sookshikkan	Nanditha	
2005	Pon Megalai	Mekhala	Tamil debut
2005	123 from Amalapuram	Aswini	Telugu debut
2006	Manathodu Mazhaikalam	Sathya	Tamil film
2007	Nagaram	Poonkodi	
2007	Soorya Kireedam	Urmila	
2023	Pallimani	Avanthika	
2023	Skanda	Sreeleela's mother	Telugu film
2023	Popcorn	Sameerana's mother	Telugu film

== Television ==
Series

List of Nithya Das television series credits
Year	Title	Role	Channel	Language
2007	Sree Ayappanum Vavarum	Ayisha	Surya TV	Malayalam
2008	Manaporutham	Maya	Kairali TV	Malayalam
2009–2012	Idhayam	Nandini	Sun TV	Tamil
2010	Indhraneelam	Geethanjali/Geethu	Surya TV	Malayalam
2012–2015	Bhairavi Aavigalukku Priyamanaval	Bhairavi	Sun TV	Tamil
2013	Kaatrinile Varum Geetham		Sun TV	Tamil
2014–2015	Akka	Seetha	Jaya TV	Tamil
2016–2017	Ottachilambu	Syamandakam/Seemanthini	Mazhavil Manorama	Malayalam
2018	Azhagu	Aishwarya	Sun TV	Tamil
2020–2022	Kannana Kanne	Yamuna	Sun TV	Tamil
2021	Anbe Vaa	Yamuna	Sun TV	Tamil
2021	Thinkalkalamaan	Herself	Surya TV	Malayalam

Shows

List of Nithya Das television show credits
Year	Title	Role	Channel	Language
2018–2019	Sreshtabharatham	Host	Amrita TV	Malayalam
2020	Comedy stars season 2	Judge	Asianet	Malayalam
2020	Star Magic	Mentor	Flowers TV	Malayalam
2020	Super Power	Mentor	Flowers TV	Malayalam
2022	Ammamarude Samsthana Sammelanam	Mentor	Flowers TV	Malayalam
2022	Red Carpet	Mentor	Amrita TV	Malayalam
2022–2023	Njanum entalum	Judge	Zee Keralam	Malayalam
2023–2024	Katturumbu 2	Judge	Flowers TV	Malayalam
2024	Star Magic	Mentor	Flowers TV	Malayalam
