= Reshmi Menon =

Indian actress

- Born: 20 June 1989 (age 37); Palakkad, Kerala, India
- Occupation: Actress
- Years active: 2010-present
- Spouse: Bobby Simha (m. 2016)
- Children: 2

Reshmi Menon is an Indian actress who predominantly appears in Tamil films.

== Career ==
In 2008, Menon was pursuing Visual Communication at Women's Christian College, Chennai, a course she enrolled in because she "loved the media". She accompanied her friend to the auditions for the Prakash Raj production, Inidhu Inidhu (2010), and was offered the lead role. She shot for the film while still studying, and had to skip classes at WCC to work in the film. Reshmi was one of several newcomers to make their acting debuts in Inidhu Inidhu. A remake of the Telugu film Happy Days, it had her reprising the role originally played by Tamannaah. Critics were divided on her performance. While The Hindu felt that she was a "cute find", Sify's critic said that she "sticks out like a sore thumb". Sekhar Kammula, the director of the original film, stated that he forgot Tamannaah and could only see Reshmi, when he saw the remake.

Reshmi then acted in the independent film Om Obama directed by Janaki Vishwanathan. The film was shot over a period of 35 days in 2010, but remains unreleased.

In 2011, she had her second release, Theneer Viduthi, the directorial debut of music director S. S. Kumaran. Reshmi played a "bubbly and talkative girl" alongside her Inidhu Inidhu co-star Adith Arun. The film, a rural comedy set in Bodinayakkanur, received mixed reviews; considering Reshmi's performance, Sify stated that she "settles into her character so comfortably that one believes that she is indeed from Bodinayakanur".

Her next release, the comedy-thriller Burma, came three years later. It received generally favorable reviews and her performance was well received, although critics felt that her role was insubstantial.

Her latest films include the fantasy thriller Urumeen, Kirumi, a "drama with elements of a psychological thriller", Natpadhigaram 79, a tale of friendship directed by Ravichandran and the romance flick Hyderabad Love Story, her maiden Telugu venture.

== Personal life ==
Menon got engaged to actor Bobby Simha on 8 November 2015, and they married on 22 April 2016. Their daughter was born on 2 May 2017. On 11 November 2019 she gave birth to their second child, a boy.

== Filmography ==
- All films in Tamil, unless otherwise noted.

Year	Film	Role	Notes
2002	Album	Viji's sister	Child artist
2003	Jayam	Young Sujatha	Child artist
2004	Chellamae	Young Mythili	Child artist
2010	Inidhu Inidhu	Madhubala (Madhu)	
2011	Theneer Viduthi	Valli	
2014	Burma	Kalpana (Noodles)	
2015	Maya	Anjali	
2015	Kirumi	Anitha	
2015	Urumeen	Umayaal	
2016	Natpadhigaram 79	Maha	
2017	Nenorakam	Swecha	Telugu film
2017	Bayama Irukku	Priyanka	
2018	Hyderabad Love Story	Bhagyalakshmi	Telugu film
2023	Vasantha Mullai	—N/a	Producer
