= Theneer Viduthi =

- Theatrical release poster
- Directed by: S. S. Kumaran
- Produced by: Anusha Devi
- Starring: Adith Arun; Reshmi Menon
- Cinematography: Azhagiya Manavalan
- Music by: S. S. Kumaran
- Production company: Peacock Pictures
- Release date: 1 July 2011
- Country: India
- Language: Tamil

Theneer Viduthi (transl. Tea stall) is a 2011 Indian Tamil-language romantic comedy drama film directed by music composer S. S. Kumaran and starring Adith Arun and Reshmi Menon.

== Plot ==
A hardworking man in the day, Kumaran (Adith Arun), turns a drunkard by night. He introduces himself as a marriage decorator and falls in love with Valli (Reshmi Menon). Her father (Prabhakar) is a petty (snack) shop owner and a pious man who dislikes drunkards. How Kumaran and Valli gain the approval of Valli's father for their union forms the rest of the story.

== Cast ==
- Adith Arun as Kumaran
- Reshmi Menon as Valli
- Prabhakar as Valli's father
- Kodumudi as Kumaran's brother
- Swetha
- Ravivarma
- Theni SN Madhavan
- Kaali Venkat as tea stall owner

== Production ==
Music director S. S. Kumaran made his directorial debut with this film. Adith Arun and Reshmi Menon, who previously starred in Inidhu Inidhu together, collaborate again for this film. The film is a romantic story with no violence. After screening the film to a select group of people, the film was trimmed based on their feedback. Kumaran wanted M. S. Bhaskar to portray the heroine's father, but he was replaced by Prabhakar, an associate of Sasi, due to the film's low budget. Kumaran had previously collaborated with Sasi in Poo. Adith Arun practiced his Tamil and dubbed for his character in the film.

== Soundtrack ==
The music was composed by S. S. Kumaran, who became a playback singer for this film.

Song title	Lyricist	Singer(s)
"Mellanna Siripaalo"	Murugan Manthiram	Kaushik, Mirudula
"Ennavo Pannuthu"	Murugan Manthiram	S.S. Kumaran, Chinmayi, S. Malavika and J.S.K. Shruthi
"Oru Maalai Pozhuthil"	Na. Muthukumar	Sona Mohapatra
"Uyirodu Uravadi"	Murugan Manthiram	S.S. Kumaran
"Ye Evan Panthakkaran"	S.S. Kumaran	Yash Golcha
"Oru Maalai Pozhuthil" (Instrumental)		

== Release and reception ==
The film released on July 1, 2011. A critic from Kungumam wrote that although Kumaran, who is known as a music composer, is a bit behind in that work, he has directed it in a way that makes one forget that he is a debut director. A critic from Dinamalar wrote that if the film could have had a little more color, fragrance and character, it could have impressed everyone.
