= Gagin =

Gagin is a surname. Notable people with the surname include:

- Chaim Abraham Gagin (1787–1848), Chief Rabbi of Ottoman Palestine
- Vanina Paoli-Gagin (born 1967), French politician
- William P. Gagin (1916–1998), American politician

== See also ==
- Gugin
- Gagini
- Gagino
- Gaging station
- Gagingwell
