= Vijay Award for Best Editor =

Award category

The Vijay Award for Best Editor is given by Star Vijay as part of its annual Vijay Awards ceremony, honoring excellence in Tamil (Kollywood) films.

== The list ==
Here is a list of the award winners and the films for which they won.

Year	Editor	Film	Link
2017	Philomin Raj	Maanagaram	
2014	Vivek Harshan	Jigarthanda	
2013	Anthony	Pandiya Naadu	
2012	Kotagiri Venkateswara Rao	Naan Ee	
2011	Kishore Te.	Engeyum Eppodhum	
2010	Kasi Viswanathan	Naan Mahaan Alla	
2009	A. Sreekar Prasad	Yavarum Nalam	
2008	Raja Mohammad	Subramaniapuram	
2007	A. Sreekar Prasad	Kattradhu Thamizh	
2006	V. T. Vijayan; B. Lenin	—	

== Nominations ==
- 2007 A. Sreekar Prasad - Katrathu Tamil
  - Anthony - Sivaji
  - Kasi Viswanathan - Mozhi
  - Praveen K. L. & N. B. Srikanth - Chennai 600028
  - Raja Mohammad - Paruthiveeran
- 2008 Raja Mohammad - Subramaniapuram
  - Anthony - Vaaranam Aayiram
  - Madhan Gunadev - Poo
  - Sadagopan Ramesh - Anjathey
- 2009 A. Sreekar Prasad - Yavarum Nalam
  - Anthony - Renigunta
  - Arun Kumar - Kanchivaram
  - Kishore Te. - Eeram
  - A. L. Ramesh - Naadodigal
- 2010 Kasi Viswanathan - Naan Mahaan Alla
  - Anthony - Vinnaithaandi Varuvaayaa
  - LVK Dass - Mynaa
  - A. Sreekar Prasad - Angadi Theru
  - V. T. Vijayan - Singam
- 2011 Kishore Te. - Engeyum Eppodhum
  - Anthony - Ko
  - Praveen K. L. & N. B. Srikanth - Aaranya Kaandam
  - Raja Mohammad - Mounaguru
  - Gagin - Yuddham Sei
- 2012 Kotagiri Venkateswara Rao - Naan Ee
  - A. Sreekar Prasad - Thuppakki
  - Gopi Krishna - Vazhakku Enn 18/9
  - Leo John Paul - Pizza
  - Praveen K. L.-N. B. Srikanth - Thadaiyara Thaakka
- 2013 Anthony - Pandiya Naadu
  - Anthony L. Ruben - Raja Rani
  - Gopinath - Onaayum Aattukkuttiyum
  - Leo John Paul - Soodhu Kavvum
  - Mahesh Narayanan - Vishwaroopam
- 2014 Vivek Harshan - Jigarthanda
  - Anthony - Goli Soda
  - Kishore Te - Nedunchaalai
  - Praveen K. L. - Madras
  - V. J. Sabu Joseph - Vallinam

== See also ==
- Tamil cinema
- Cinema of India
