= Antoine-Henri Jomini =

Swiss general and writer on the art of war (1779–1869)

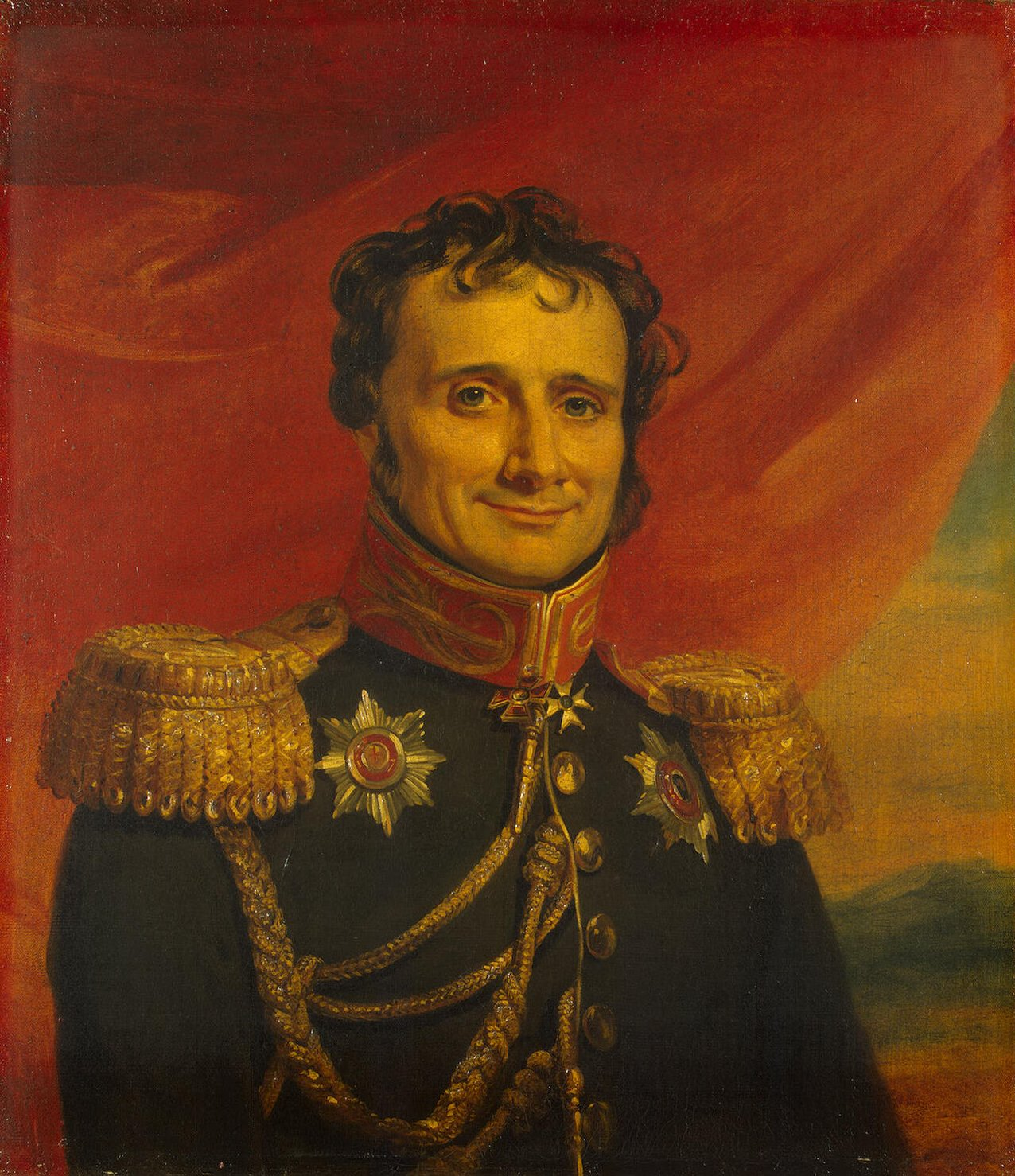
- Portrait by George Dawe
- Born: 6 March 1779; Payerne, Switzerland
- Died: 22 March 1869 (aged 90); Paris, France
- Military career
- Allegiance: Helvetic Republic (1798–1801); First French Empire (1805–1813); Russian Empire (1813–1829)
- Branch: French Imperial Army; Russian Imperial Army
- Conflicts: Napoleonic Wars; Russo-Turkish War (1828–1829)
- Awards: Baron of the Empire

Baron Antoine-Henri Jomini (French: [ʒɔmini]; 6 March 1779 – 22 March 1869) was a Swiss-French military officer who served as a general in French and later in Russian service, and one of the most celebrated writers on the Napoleonic art of war. Jomini was largely self-taught in military strategy, and his ideas are a staple at military academies, the United States Military Academy at West Point being a prominent example; his theories were thought to have affected many officers who later served in the American Civil War. He may have coined the term logistics in his Summary of the Art of War (1838).

== Early life and business career ==
Jomini was born on 6 March 1779 in Payerne, Vaud, Switzerland, to Benjamin Jomini and Jeanne Marcuard. The Jominis were an old Swiss family, and both his father and paternal grandfather served as mayor of Payerne. In his youth, Jomini "was fascinated by soldiers and the art of war," and hoped to join the military, but his parents pushed him towards a career in business. As a result, Jomini entered a business school in Aarau at the age of 14.

In April 1795, Jomini left school and went to work at the banking house of Monsieurs Preiswerk in Basel. In 1796, he moved to Paris, where he worked first at the Mosselmann banking house and then as a stockbroker. After a short time in banking, however, "Jomini convinced himself that the tedious life of a banker was not to be compared with the life afforded in the French Army" and decided to become a military officer as soon as he found an opportunity.

== Swiss Army ==
In 1798, at the time of the establishment of the Helvetic Republic, Jomini was an eager revolutionary and an associate of Frédéric-César de La Harpe. He soon found a position in the new Swiss government as a secretary for the Minister of War with the rank of captain. In 1799, after being promoted to the rank of major, Jomini took responsibility for reorganizing the operations of the ministry. In that capacity, he standardized many procedures, and used his position "to experiment with organizational systems and strategies".

After the Peace of Lunéville in 1801, Jomini returned to Paris, where he worked for a military equipment manufacturer. He found the job uninteresting and spent most of his time preparing his first book on military theory: Traité des grandes opérations militaires (Treatise on Major Military Operations). Michel Ney, one of Napoleon's top generals, read the book in 1803 and subsidized its publication. The book appeared in several volumes from 1804 to 1810 and was "quickly translated and widely discussed" throughout Europe.

== Service in the Napoleonic Wars ==
=== French Army ===
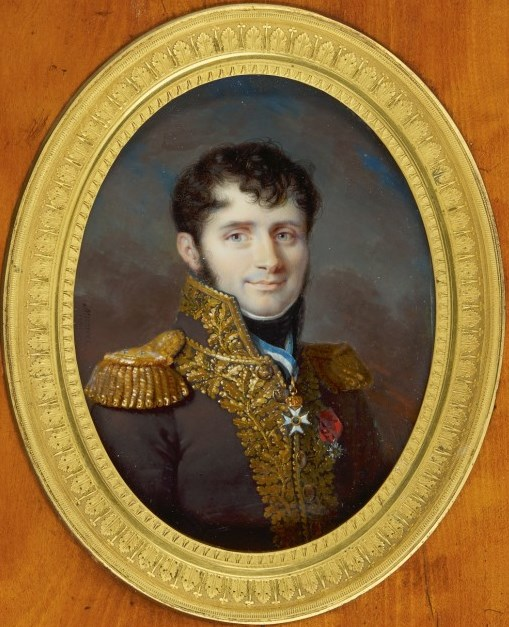
Jomini in 1811

Jomini served on Ney's staff in the 1805 campaign. He fought with Ney at the Battle of Ulm, and in December of that year he was offered a commission as a colonel in the French Army.

In 1806, Jomini published his views as to the conduct of the impending war with Prussia. That, along with his knowledge of Frederick the Great's campaigns, which Jomini had described in the Traité, led Napoleon to attach him to his own headquarters. Jomini was present with Napoleon at the Battle of Jena and at the Battle of Eylau, where he won the cross of the Legion of Honour.

After the Peace of Tilsit, Jomini was made chief of the staff to Ney and was created a baron. In the Spanish campaign of 1808, his advice was often valuable to the marshal, but Jomini quarreled with his chief and was left exposed to his numerous enemies, especially Louis Alexandre Berthier, the emperor's chief of staff.

=== Russian Army ===
Overtures had been made to him, as early as 1807, to enter the Russian service, but Napoleon, hearing of his intention to leave the French army, compelled him to remain in the service with the rank of general of brigade. For some years thereafter, Jomini held both a French and a Russian commission, with the consent of both sovereigns. However, when war between France and Russia broke out, he was in a difficult position, which he dealt with by taking a noncombat command on the line of communication.

Jomini was thus engaged when the retreat from Moscow and the uprising of Prussia transferred the seat of war to central Germany. He promptly rejoined Ney and took part in the Battle of Lützen. As chief of the staff of Ney's group of corps, he rendered distinguished services before and at the Battle of Bautzen. For this he was recommended for the rank of general of division. Berthier, however, not only erased Jomini's name from the list but also put him under arrest and censured him in army orders for failing to supply certain staff reports that had been called for. How far Jomini was responsible for certain misunderstandings that prevented the attainment of all the results hoped for from Ney's attack at Bautzen is unknown. Jomini considered the pretext for censure trivial and baseless, and during the armistice he did as he had intended to do in 1809–1810 and went into the Russian service.

That move was seen as tantamount to deserting to the enemy by many in the French army and by some of his new comrades. This was despite Jomini having held a dormant commission in the Russian army for years and having declined to take part in the invasion of Russia in 1812. Moreover, as Napoleon noted, he was a Swiss citizen, not a Frenchman.

His Swiss patriotism was strong, and he withdrew from the Allied Army in 1814 when he found that he could not prevent the Allies' violation of Swiss neutrality. Apart from love of his own country, the desire to study, to teach and to practice the art of war were his main motives. At the critical moment of the battle of Eylau, he had exclaimed, "If I were the Russian commander for two hours!" On joining the allies, he received the rank of lieutenant-general and the appointment of aide-de-camp from the tsar and rendered important assistance during the German campaign. An accusation that he had betrayed the numbers, positions and intentions of the French to the enemy was later acknowledged by Napoleon to be without foundation. As a Swiss patriot and as a French officer, he declined to take part in the passage of the Rhine at Basel and the subsequent invasion of France.

In 1815, he was with Tsar Alexander in Paris and attempted to save the life of his old commander Ney. The defense of Ney almost cost Jomini his position in the Russian service. He succeeded, however, in overcoming the resistance of his enemies and took part in the Congress of Vienna.

== Postwar service and retirement ==
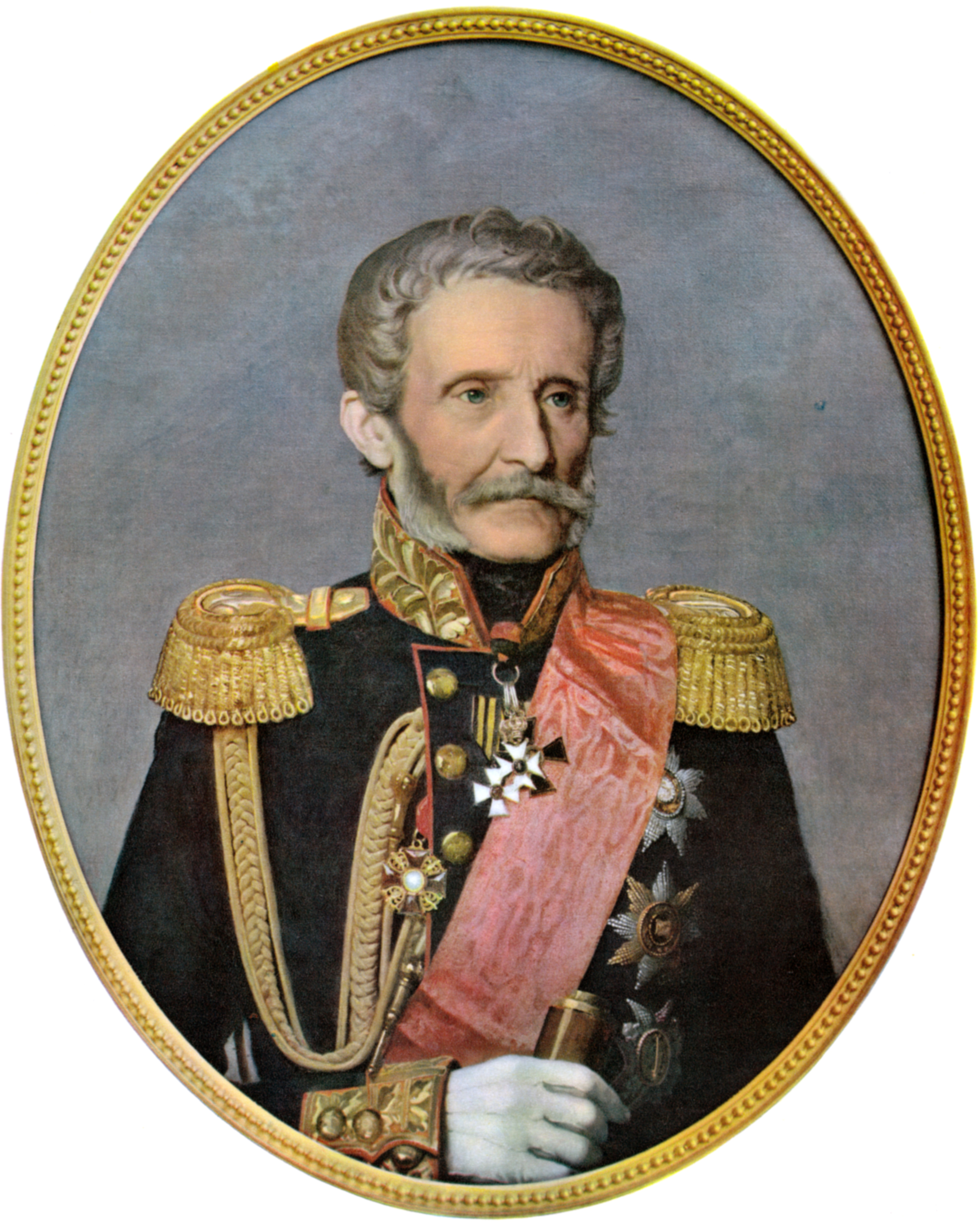
Jomini in 1859, by Marc-Charles-Gabriel Gleyre

After several years of retirement and literary work, Jomini resumed his post in the Russian army, and in about 1823, he was made a full general. Until his retirement in 1829 he was principally employed in the military education of the Tsarevich Nicholas (afterwards Emperor) and in the organization of the Russian staff college, which was established in 1832 and bore its original name of the Nicholas Academy up to the October Revolution of 1917. In 1828 he was employed in the field in the Russo-Turkish War, and at the Siege of Varna he was awarded the Grand Cordon of the Alexander Order.

That was his last active service. In 1829, he settled in Brussels, which served as his main place of residence for the next thirty years. In 1853, after trying without success to bring about a political understanding between France and Russia, Jomini was called to St Petersburg to act as a military adviser to the Tsar during the Crimean War. He returned to Brussels upon the conclusion of peace in 1856. Later, he settled at Passy near Paris. Until the end of his life he continued to write treatises, pamphlets and open letters on subjects of military art and history. In 1859, he was asked by Napoleon III to furnish a plan of campaign for the Franco-Austrian War. One of his last essays dealt with the Austro-Prussian War of 1866 and the influence of the breech-loading rifle. He died at Passy a year before the Franco-Prussian War of 1870–71.

== Writings and influence ==
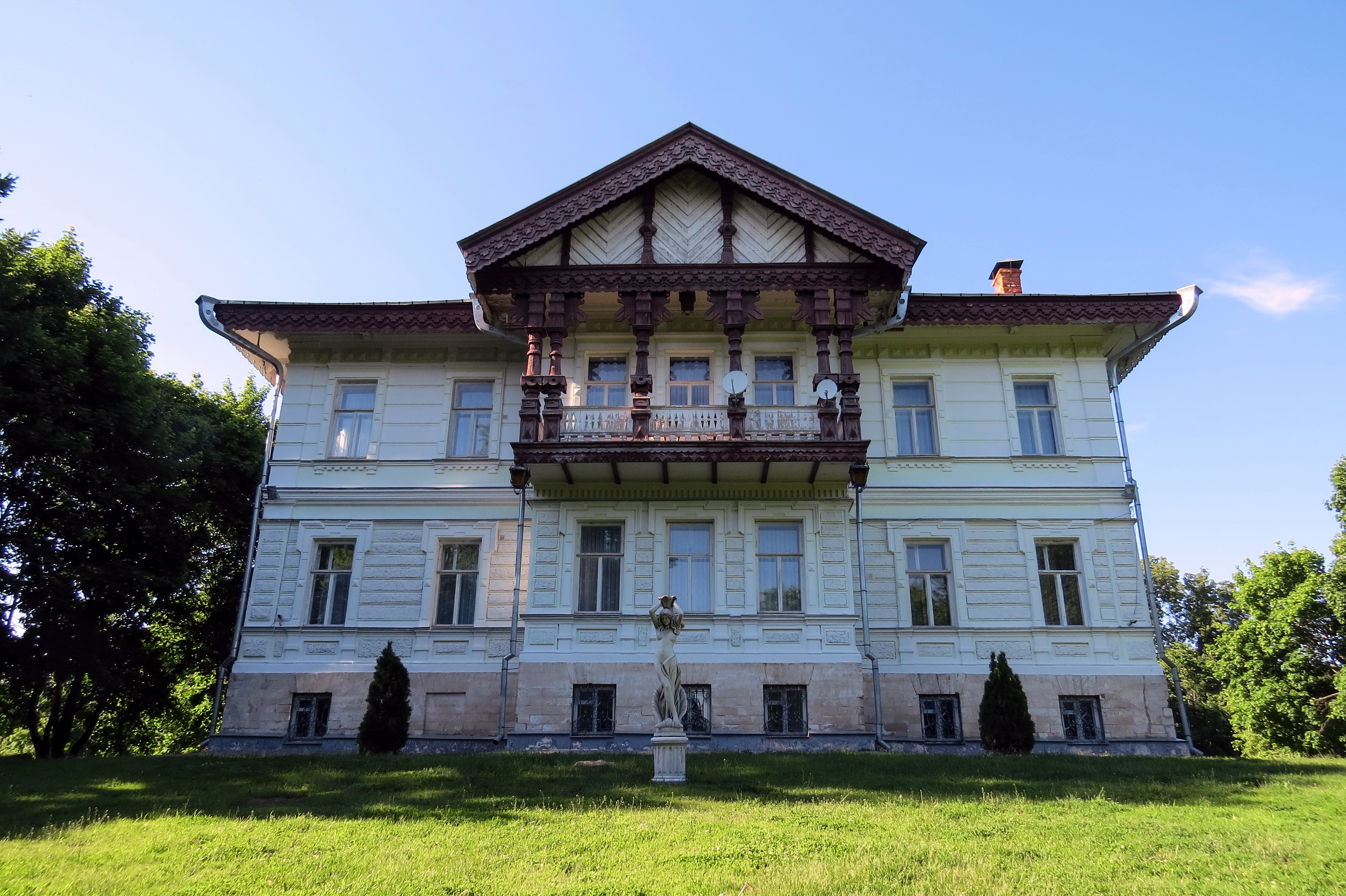
General Jomini's estate in Russia near Gagino.

Jomini's military writings are frequently analyzed: he took a didactic, prescriptive approach, reflected in a detailed vocabulary of geometric terms such as bases, strategic lines, and key points. His operational prescription was fundamentally simple: put superior combat power at the decisive point. In the theoretical Chapter 25 of the Traité de grande tactique, he stressed the exclusive superiority of interior lines.

As one writer sympathetic to Carl von Clausewitz, Jomini's chief rival in the field of military theory, put it:

Jomini was no fool, however. His intelligence, facile pen, and actual experience of war made his writings a great deal more credible and useful than so brief a description can imply. Once he left Napoleon's service, he maintained himself and his reputation primarily through prose. His writing style—unlike Clausewitz's—reflected his constant search for an audience. He dealt at length with a number of practical subjects (logistics, seapower) that Clausewitz had largely ignored. Elements of his discussion (his remarks on Great Britain and seapower, for instance, and his sycophantic treatment of Austria's Archduke Charles) are clearly aimed at protecting his political position or expanding his readership. And, one might add, at minimizing Clausewitz's, for he clearly perceived the Prussian writer as his chief competitor. For Jomini, Clausewitz's death thirty-eight years prior to his own came as a piece of rare good fortune.

Jomini took the view that the amount of force deployed should be kept to the minimum in order to lower casualties and that war was not an exact science. Specifically, Jomini stated in his book:

War in its ensemble is NOT a science, but an art. Strategy, particularly, may indeed be regulated by fixed laws resembling those of the positive sciences, but this is not true of war viewed as a whole. Among other things, combats may be mentioned as often being quite independent of scientific combinations, and they may become essentially dramatic, personal qualities and inspirations and a thousand other things frequently being the controlling elements. The passions which agitate the masses that are brought into collision, the warlike qualities of these masses, the energy and talent of their commanders, the spirit, more or less martial, of nations and epochs,—in a word, every thing that can be called the poetry and metaphysics of war,—will have a permanent influence on its results.

While in Russian service, Jomini sought to promote a more scientific approach at the general staff academy he helped to found.

Prior to the American Civil War, the translated writings of Jomini were the only works on military strategy that were taught at the United States Military Academy at West Point. His ideas, as taught by Professor Dennis Hart Mahan, permeated the Academy and shaped the basic military thinking of its graduates.

The regular army officers who became the general officers for both the Union and the Confederacy in the Civil War began by following Jominian principles. However, the British historian John Keegan argues, in The American Civil War, that the peculiarities of American geography, particularly as pursued by Ulysses S. Grant and William T. Sherman in the Western Theater of the American Civil War, forced them to move beyond his geometric conventions and find other strategic solutions to the problems that confronted them.

== Works ==
- Jomini, Henri. Traité de grande tactique, ou, Relation de la guerre de sept ans, extraite de Tempelhof, commentée et comparée aux principales opérations de la dernière guerre; avec un recueil des maximes les plus importantes de l'art militaire, justifiées par ces différents événements. Paris: Giguet et Michaud, 1805. In English translation as: Jomini, Antoine-Henri, trans. Col. S.B. Holabird, U.S.A. Treatise on Grand Military Operations: or A Critical and Military History of the Wars of Frederick the Great as Contrasted with the Modern System, 2 vols. New York: D. van Nostrand, 1865.
- Jomini, Le Baron de. Précis de l'Art de la Guerre: Des Principales Combinaisons de la Stratégie, de la Grande Tactique et de la Politique Militaire. Brussels: Meline, Cans et Copagnie, 1838. In English translation as: Jomini, Baron de, trans. Major O.F. Winship and Lieut. E.E. McLean [USA]. The Art of War. New York: G.P. Putnam, 1854; Jomini, Baron de, trans. Capt. G.H. Mendell and Lieut. W.P. Craighill [USA]. The Art of War. Philadelphia: J.B. Lippincott, 1862; reprinted, Westport, CT: Greenwood Press, 1971; reprinted, with a new introduction by Charles Messenger, London: Greenhill Books, 1992.
- Jomini, Le Baron de. Histoire critique et militaire des campagnes de la Révolution (1806; new ed. 1819–1824), Paris and Brussels, 1806, 1824.
- Jomini, Le Baron de. Vie Politique et Militaire de Napoléon recontée par lui-même au Tribunal de César d'Alexandre et de Frédéric, 4 vol., Anselin, Paris, 1827

== See also ==
- Military strategy
- List of military theorists
