= Agni Devi =

2019 Indian film by John Paul Raj and Sham Surya

- Film poster
- Directed by: John Paul Raj; Sham Surya
- Written by: John Paul Raj; Karundhel Rajesh; Rajesh Kumar
- Produced by: Stalin and John Paul Raj
- Starring: Bobby Simha; Madhoo; Ramya Nambeesan
- Cinematography: Jana
- Edited by: Deepak
- Music by: Jakes Bejoy
- Production companies: Seatoa Studios; Jai Film Productions
- Release date: 22 March 2019
- Running time: 97 minutes
- Country: India
- Language: Tamil
- Budget: 4.2 Crores

Agni Devi is a 2019 Tamil-language thriller film directed by John Paul Raj and Sham Surya. The film stars Bobby Simha, Madhoo and Ramya Nambeesan. It was produced by JPR and Stalin under Jai Film Productions and Seatoa Studios. The music was composed by Jakes Bejoy with cinematography by Jana and editing by Deepak. The film underwent production trouble before releasing on 22 March 2019. The film received negative reviews from critics.

== Plot ==
Agni Dev IPS (Bobby Simha), a devoted cop, has taken charge of investigating the brutal murder of a journalist that happened in broad daylight. As the case progresses, Agni is asked by his senior, Charles (Bose Venkat), to stop proceeding further with the investigation. He realises that Charles has been intimidated by Shakuntala Devi (Madhoo), a dreaded politician, under abusive circumstances, who was later revealed to be his mother he lost when he was four. How Agni tackles her and nabs the culprit forms the rest of the story.

== Cast ==
- Bobby Simha as Agni Dev IPS
- Madhoo as Shakuntala Devi
- Ramya Nambeesan as Deepa
- Sathish as Sathyamoorthy IPS
- Livingston as Agni's foster father
- Bose Venkat as Charles, Commissioner of Police
- M. S. Bhaskar as Manimaran, Politician
- Delhi Ganesh as Constable
- Sanjeev as Deepak
- Manohar
- Saathika
- Thahil
- Ansilana Asath
- Dinesh
- Grace
- Naadodigal Gopal
- Vicky
- A. T. Vijayan
- Priyamudan Unni

== Marketing ==
In January 2019, the name was changed to Agni Devi.

== Controversy ==
Three days before the release of the film, the lead actor Bobby Simha filed a complaint at Nandambakkam police station against director John Paulraj. In his complaint, Simha said that he had only acted in the film for five days and had opted out of the film after the director had shot scenes which were not in sync with the script narrated to the actor. Simha also mentioned that most of the scenes in the film featuring him were shot with body double and VFX.

Despite the report, the film had a theatrical release across Tamil Nadu. Simha later added that he sensed the team was unprofessional by the fourth day of shoot as the director had veered away from the agreed decision to base the plot on a novel written by Rajeshkumar. Furthermore, Simha was unhappy with the sudden involvement of a co-director named Sham Surya, who was also given directorial credits for the project. Despite a request from the Nadigar Sangam to settle the issue amicably, Simha refused to co-operate and announced his intentions of seeking judicial action. Lamenting the inactivity of the professional association, Simha highlighted that the Nadigar Sangam had failed to assist him during previous disagreements about the films, Chennai Ungalai Anbudan Varaverkirathu (2015) and Meera Jaakirathai (2016).

== Reception ==
Srivatsan S of The Hindu wrote, "There are bad films. There are horrible films. And there’s Agni Devi, that takes blandness to a whole new dimension." Ashameera Aiyappan of The New Indian Express gave 2/5 stars and wrote, "There are films that infuriate you, ones that irritate. But Agni Devi pushed me into a zone of indifference. I couldn’t bring myself to even hate or mock it with a vengeance. All I could do was just wonder how the movie got made in the first place." Kirubhakar Purushothaman of India Today gave 1.5/5 stars and wrote, "Agni Devi is a silly and superficial political thriller that has a most horrendous climax." Anjana Shekar of The News Minute wrote, "Agni Devi looks promising for about 10 minutes and then goes steadily haywire after that - is it no good because the actor walked out of the project or did he walk out because it was no good? We may never know."
