= Chaliapin (disambiguation) =

Chaliapin may refer to:

- Feodor Chaliapin (1873–1938), Russian opera singer
- Boris Chaliapin, artist and illustrator, son of Feodor Chaliapin
- Feodor Chaliapin, Jr. (1905–1992), actor, son of Feodor Chaliapin
- Prokhor Chaliapin, Russian folk singer and television personality
- 2562 Chaliapin, an asteroid
- Chaliapin festival, Gagino, a Russian music event
