= Sweety Naughty Crazy =

Tamil film

- Theatrical release poster
- Directed by: Rajasekar G
- Written by: Rajasekar G
- Produced by: R. Arun
- Starring: Thrigun; Srijita Ghosh; Ineya; Radha
- Cinematography: C. Vijayasri
- Edited by: K. Kumar
- Music by: S. N. Arunagiri
- Production company: Arun Visualz Productions
- Release date: 13 February 2026
- Running time: 140 minutes
- Country: India
- Language: Tamil

Sweety Naughty Crazy is an Indian Tamil-language adult comedy film written and directed by Rajasekar G in his directorial debut, starring Thrigun, Srijita Ghosh, Ineya and Radha in the lead roles. The film has cinematography handled by C. Vijayasri, editing done by K. Kumar and music composed by S. N. Arunagiri.

Sweety Naughty Crazy was released in theatres on 13 February 2026.

== Cast ==
- Thrigun as Shiva
- Srijita Ghosh as Anitha
- Ineya as Nandini Miss
- Radha as Shylu Aunty
- Thambi Ramaiah as Anitha's father
- Ravi Mariya as Warden
- Ali as Ganeshan
- Sathyan as Nandini's husband
- Madhan Bob as Doctor
- Chaams as Astrologer

== Production ==
Thrigun who was last seen in Lineman (2024) was announced as the lead actor in his next titled Sweety Naught Crazy, which had its launch event on 7 August 2024 in Hyderabad. The film is written and directed by debutant Rajasekar G, alongside Ineya, Srijita Ghosh and Radha playing the lead actresses. The film is produced under Arun Visualz Productions banner, with the technical team consisting of cinematographer C. Vijayasri, editor K. Kumar and music composer S. N. Arunagiri.

== Music ==
The first single "Thai Thai" was released on 23 January 2026.

== Release ==
Sweety Naughty Crazy was released in theatres on 13 February 2026.

== Reception ==
Abhinav Subramanian of The Times of India rated the film with 2.5 out of 5 stars, calling it a guilty pleasure with a low ceiling. The film was also reviewed by Dina Thanthi and Maalai Malar.
