= Virunthali =

- Directed by: Udayasankaran Whaterman
- Written by: Udayasankaran Whaterman; Singampuli (dialogues)
- Produced by: Rajesh Gopinath
- Starring: Michael Ishwar; Vidya Pradeep
- Cinematography: Sajan Kalathil
- Edited by: Raja Mohammad
- Music by: S. S. Kumaran
- Production company: Gopika International
- Release date: 16 July 2010
- Running time: 135 minutes
- Country: India
- Language: Tamil

Virunthali (transl. Guest) is a 2010 Tamil language romantic drama film directed by Udayasankaran Whaterman. The film stars newcomer Michael Ishwar and Vidya Pradeep, with Gopika Rajesh, Nassar, Bala Singh, Singampuli, Appukutty and Ambani Shankar playing supporting roles. The film, produced by Rajesh Gopinath, had musical score by S. S. Kumaran and was released on 16 July 2010.

== Plot ==
In a small village in Madurai, Ishvar (Ishvar) is a hard-boiled moneylender who hangs out with his sidekick Oli Shankar (Singampuli). He lives in a luxurious bungalow with his mother. They are both eagerly awaiting the release of Ishvar's father (Nassar), who is in prison for murder. The villagers highly respect the family. One day, the law student Archana (Vidya Pradeep), the daughter of the village postman Rangarajan (Bala Singh), comes to the village. Each encounter between Ishvar and Archana ends in a quarrel, but they eventually fall in love. When Rangarajan falls ill, Archana is forced to perform her father's job, while Ishvar stops lending money and opens a pawn shop. In the meantime, Ishvar helps his friend Arun marry his lover Kanaka. Kanaka was brought up by her aunt and uncle, who want to appropriate her inheritance.

Meanwhile, Ishvar's father returns from jail. Arun is then killed by Kanaka's family with the help of the corrupt Sub-Inspector Muttaiah (Cheran Raj), and a shocked Archana witnesses it. Kanaka's family abducts Kanaka and forces her to give them her inheritance. Archana then reveals everything to Ishvar, and a vengeful Ishvar saves Kanaka. Thereafter, some goons kill Archana in her house and stage the murder to look like a suicide by hanging. Overwhelmed by his lover's death, Ishvar becomes mentally ill.

== Cast ==
- Michael Ishwar as Ishvar
- Vidya Pradeep as Archana
- Gopika Rajesh as Gopika
- Nassar as Ishvar's father
- Bala Singh as Rangarajan, Archana's father
- Singampuli as Oli Shankar
- Cheran Raj as Sub-Inspector Muttaiah
- Appukutty as Kaadu
- Ambani Shankar as Parthiban
- Harish Ori
- Sivathanu
- Bhuvan
- Bharathi
- Prema Priya
- Surya Mohan
- Rajini Murali
- Lakshmi
- Dhanya
- Risha in a special appearance

== Production ==
Director Udayasankaran Whaterman, who hailed from Kerala and had worked as an associate director with A. K. Lohithadas, made his directorial debut with Virunthali under the banner of Gopika International. Ishvar (also known as Anand Michael and Jack Michael) was selected to play the hero while Vidya Pradeep (credited as Dhyana) who played the second heroine in Aval Peyar Thamizharasi (2010) was chosen to play the female lead role. Music baton was wielded by S. S. Kumaran of Poo fame, Raja Mohammad took care of the editing and the cinematography was by Sajan Kalathil.

== Soundtrack ==
The soundtrack was composed by S. S. Kumaran. The soundtrack, released in 2010, features 6 tracks. The audio was launched by Cheran at Kamala Cinemas in Chennai. Kalaipuli G. Sekaran, Prasanna, Karan, Ezhil and Sasi attended the audio launch.

Track listing
No.	Title	Writer(s)	Singer(s)	Length
1.	"Eppodhu un Jannal"	Victordas	Hariharan, Mahalakshmi Iyer	04:16
2.	"Kadidhame Kadidhame"	Murugan Mandhiram	S. S. Kumaran	04:02
3.	"Kokka Kokka Kozhi"	Murugan Mandhiram	Chinmayi, Vinitha, Srimathi	01:23
4.	"Aasa Arakki"	Murugan Mandhiram	Yash Golcha, B. Suhasini	03:29
5.	"Endhan Uyir"	Murugan Mandhiram	Yash Golcha	04:35
6.	"Singam Varudhu"	Victordas	Yash Golcha	03:55
Total length:				21:40

== Critical reception ==
Sify stated, "The film is poor in imagination, content and visuals and you have non-actors in the lead making it tedious to watch. It requires a lot of patience to sit through this big bore, that lacks basic fundamentals of filmmaking".
