= Kaushik Menon =

Indian singer

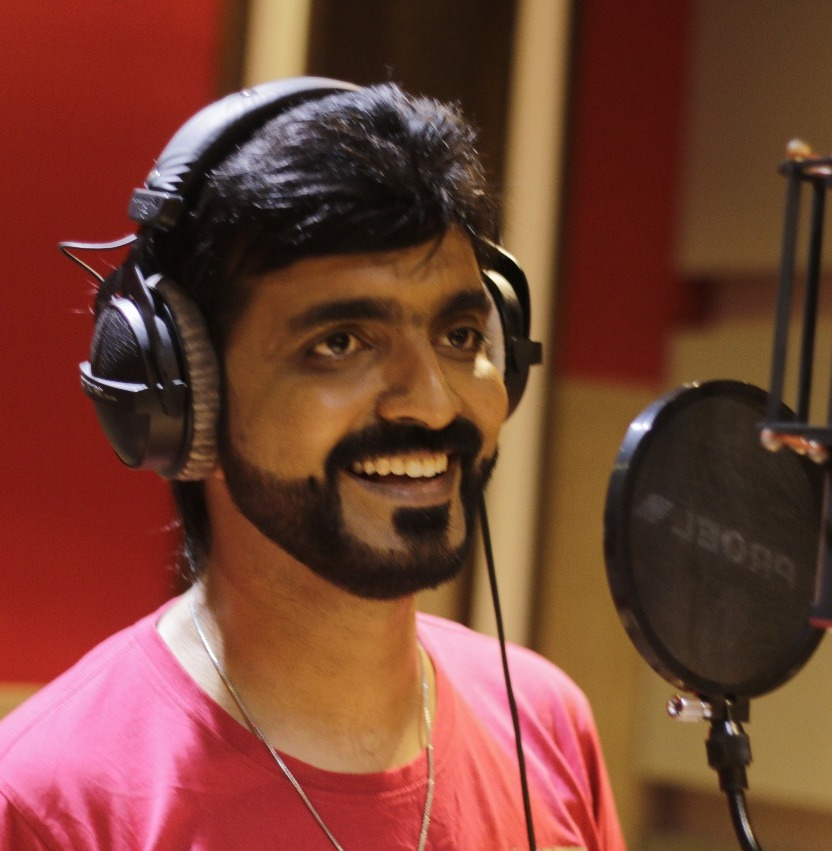
- Born: Karthik; Palakkad
- Citizenship: India
- Known for: Playback Singer
- Parents: Govindan Kutty (father); Sree Parvathi (mother)
- Awards: 2009 Best Upcoming Playback Singer, Mirchi Music Awards

Kaushik Menon (also known as Kaushik) is a vocalist and an Indian playback singer working in the south Indian film industry for decades.. He started his professional playback singing career in the year in 2003, and since has been working as playback singer for many films in multiple languages - including Hindi, Malayalam, Tamil, Kannada, and Telugu. He has so far undertaken about 300 musical projects, in which he has sung over 200 film songs . He is known for his song, "Natkal Nagardu varudangal " – the song of friendship, an award winning solo song, from the movie Ninaithale Inikkum that gave him a major breakthrough as a playback singer. His other famous songs includes: Kanni Vyil along with Shreya Ghoshal, from "Vari kuzhiele kolapathakam" in Malayalam film, Mellena sirippalo solo song from "Theneer viduthi" in Tamil, Choodu Choodu solo song, from the movie "Raja Yogam, in Telugu, Chitranga from the movie " Teluggabhai" along with veteran singer inTelegu along with Min Mini, Ravi varmana from the Kannada film "Budhivandha" along with veteran singer Hariharan etc.

He also owns a leading recording studio by the name of "Tapas Studio" In Chennai, as patronised by leading personalities and singers like S P Balasubramaniam, M Jayachandran, Anu Radha Sriram, Director Prabhu Solman S. Janaki, K S Chitra etc. He has been awarded "Golden Visa (cultural) " by the UAE Government, acknowledging his acoustic special talents. He has performed in many stage shows in the UAE along with being the RJ of a reputed FM in UAE, shuttling between UAE and India busy with his musical career. His other activities include being a judge in many Indian Television reality shows like Top star singer, Sari g ama Pa in Tamil, Sun Singer TV shows in Tamil and performed in many TV shows and musical events. He appeared in many Television shows and interviews in Vijay TV, Sun TV, Pudiya Thalaimurai TV, Vasanth TV. Mega TV, Tamizan TV, Sun Music, Zee Tamil, Kairali TV, Media 1, etc. His passion includes identifying young talents and coaching them to become a stage singer and has a record of making many young stage singers of today. In UAE he has been practicing "Al yowla" Arabic songs to intertwine with Indian Music in the form of fusion music, which has attracted the attention of many Arabic followers, He has verified social media followers, through which, his songs has become viral. He is also a "Branding and Creative Head" for many commercial firms from India, UAE & Canada, on contract, for the promotion of their products along with being the designer for many of their stage events.

== Playback singing career ==
=== Early career ===
Kaushik Menon has the record of being a young talent artist and started his singing in school youth festivals & stage shows and later at his age of 18 he was personally identified as a young talent and encouraged by the veteran singer S. Janaki to go to Chennai from his home town in Pallakad and she supported him throughout his younger days, giving him loads of opportunities to sing along with her in fifty plus, stage shows. Later, he got an opportunity to sing in front of music director Ilayaraja in the year 2003 and started his playback singing career. He was then recognised through his Ninaithale Inikkum movie song composed by Vijay Antony and he got the best upcoming playback singer award from Mirchi music awards.

In 2009, Kaushik won "Best Upcoming Male Singer award" in Mirchi Music Award South for his song "Natkal Nagarndhu", from the movie Ninaithale Inikkum. In 2013, Kaushik attempted singing the male cover version of "Nenjukulle" from A.R. Rahman’s movie Kadal, (originally sung by Shakthisree Gopalan).

In 2013, he made entry into the Mollywood with a duet melody number Nin Mounavum from the movie Entry. His melody number, "Oru Mozhi Mindathe" from the Malayalam film Law Point gave him a major breakthrough in Mollywood, since then, he has worked with many music directors including A.R. Rahman, Harris Jayaraj, Vijay Antony, Joshua Sridhar, and Mejo Joseph.

== Filmography as a playback singer ==
=== Tamil songs ===
Year	Film	Song	Music director	Co-singer(s)
2008	Aasai Paravai	Kannil Kalantha	R.K. Sundar	Solo
2009	Ninaithale Inikkum	Naatkal Nagarndhu	Vijay Antony	Solo
2010	Pesuvathu Kiliya	Boologam Ellaamae	A. R. Reihana	A.R. Reihana, Yemil
2010	Nellu	Kodiyodu Thamara Poo	S.S. Kumaran	Chinmayee
2011	Theneer Viduthi	Mellanna Sripalo	S.S. Kumaran	Mirudula
2012	Oru Mazhai Naangu Saaral	Nanba Sernthu Vaada	A. D. Mohan	Solo
2012	Gokulam	Malli Malli Vaasam	Anuropan	Solo
2012	Thambi Oorukku Pudusu	Anru Unnai	Gurukiran	Kalyani
2013	Anandha Thollai	Sey Seyyaro (Remix)	Ali Mirsa	Padmalatha
2013	Chennaiyil Oru Naal	Kanavey (Male)	Mejo Joseph	Solo
2014	Raavanan	Kalvare (Backing Vocals)	A.R.Rahman	
2015	Enthiran	Arima Arima (Backing Vocals)	A.R.Rahman	
2020	Adi adi penne	Omar lulu	Solo	

=== Malayalam songs ===
Year	Film	Song	Music director	Co-singer(s)
2012	Entry	Nin Mounavum	Mejo Joseph	Minmini
2014	Law point	Oru Mozhi Mindathe	Mejo Joseph	Solo
2016	Dhanayathra	Mutharam	Rajamani	
2017	C/O Sairabanu	Aromale	Mejo Joseph	
2019	Varikuzhiyile Kolapathakam	Kanniveyil	Mejo Joseph	
2019	Anugraheethan Antony	Bow Bow	Arun Muraleedharan	Anannya Nair

=== Telugu songs ===
Year	Film	Song	Music director	Co-singer(s)
2008	Prema	Rendojamu	Joshua Sridhar	Rita
2008	Prema	Oh Priya	Joshua Sridhar	Sriya
2008	Swamy IPS	Ayyayyo Ayyayyo	Harris Jayaraj	Shravya
2011	Prema Sagaram	Premalo Regene	Kalai, Shabesh Murali	Solo
2012	Chelagatam	Boys Google	Sundar C. Babu	Hema
2013	Telugabbai	Chitranga Unde	Mejo Joseph	Minmini
2013	Telugabbai	Chitranga Unde Manasu	Mejo Joseph	Minmini
2013	Telugabbai	Na Camera	Mejo Joseph	Geetha Madhuri, Pavani

=== Kannada Songs ===
Year	Film	Song	Music director
2008	Budhivandha	Ravivarmana	Vijay Antony

=== Television Title Songs ===
Year	Programme	Language	Music director	TV Channel
2013	Vani rani	Tamil	Satya	Sun TV
2013	Onnum Onnum Moonu	Malayalam	Arun Muraleedharan	Mazhavil Manorama

== Awards ==
Mirchi Music Awards South

Year	Category	Song	Film
2009	Best Upcoming Male Singer	Natkal Nagarndhu	Ninaithale Inikkum

== Others ==
- വിജയ് യേശുദാസിനോട് കൗശിക് മേനോന്‌ പറയാനുള്ളത് | Kaushik Menon - Karma News, October 23, 2020.
- 10 അവസരം ഒരാൾക്ക് കൊടുക്കുമ്പോൾ, കഷ്ടപ്പെടുന്ന കഴിവുള്ള ഒരു കലാകാരന് ഒരു അവസരം കൊടുത്തൂടെ - Karma News, June 20, 2020
- തെരുവു മൃഗങ്ങളെ വളർത്താൻ ലൈസൻസ് എടുക്കണമെന്ന നിയമം ഉപകാരപ്രദമാണോ എന്ന് ചിന്തിക്കേണ്ടതുണ്ട്, കൗശിക് മേനോൻ - Karma News, July 19, 2021
- കെ എസ് ചിത്രയെ അപമാനിച്ചു, കണ്ണീരോടെ കൗശിക് മേനോൻ - Karma News, Jan 22 2022
