= Edaina Jaragocchu =

- Film poster
- Directed by: K Ramakanth
- Produced by: Wet Brain Entertainment
- Starring: Bobby Simha; Vijay Raja; Ravi Siva Teja; Viva Raghav; Pooja Solanki; Sasha Singh
- Cinematography: Sameer Reddy
- Edited by: Uddav
- Music by: Srikanth Pendyala
- Release date: 23 August 2019
- Country: India
- Language: Telugu

Edaina Jaragocchu (transl. Anything can happen) is a 2019 Indian Telugu language action thriller film directed by K Ramakanth, who previously worked as an assistant to Chandra Sekhar Yeleti. The film stars Bobby Simha, Vijay Raja, Ravi Siva Teja, Viva Raghav, Pooja Solanki, and Sasha Singh in the lead roles. This film marks the debut of Sivaji Raja's son Vijay Raja. The music was composed by Srikanth Pendyala with cinematography by Sameer Reddy and editing by Uddav. The film was released on 23 August 2019.

== Plot ==
Kalicharan (Kali) is a local racketeer, who organizes a cricket betting club as a bookie. His orphaned background made him insensitive and ruthless, leading to torturing and humiliating whoever tries to evade paying their debts. He maintains a private life and has a secret he guards by killing everyone who discovers it.

Three friends - Jai, Vicky, and Rocky - who all share the same birth date, April 1, always fall in trouble with their foolishness, yet they consider themselves smart, not being able to tolerate if anybody calls or makes them fools. At his new job as a bank recovery agent (debt collector), Jai meets a beautiful girl, Sasi, and immediately falls for her. Sasi is educated and ambitious, and dreams of becoming an entrepreneur like Chanda Kochhar and Indra Nooyi. She sets up a startup company, but loses all her money. While in the process of creating a new startup, she manages her lifestyle privately. In pursuance, Jai and Sasi formulate tit-for-tat plans and finally become friends. The three friends offer her a quick-money opportunity with Bitcoin, but they lose the money.

To earn back Sasi's love and their money, the boys try their hand at cricket betting, which Kali organizes. Initially they win, but eventually they start losing all bets, leading to a 1 crore debt to Kali. The boys are worried and do not know how to repay the debt, but they soon realize that they were fooled by Kali and decide to take revenge by robbing him. However, when they enter his mahal, they see a ghost, who is Kali’s lifeline. The boys realize that Kali is practically living with the ghost. Frightened, they flee from the mahal, with Kali and the ghost pursuing them. The identities of the mahal's two inhabitants are later revealed.

== Cast ==
- Bobby Simha as Kalicharan
- Vijay Raja as Jai
- Ravi Siva Teja as Vicky
- Viva Raghav as Rocky
- Pooja Solanki as Sasi
- Sasha Singh as Baby
- Nagendra Babu as Church Father
- Ajay Ghosh as Hizrath
- Thagubothu Ramesh as Drunkard
- Satya Krishnan
- Harsha Chemudu
- Chammak Chandra
- Vennela Kishore as a movie director who looks for a real ghost for his film (special appearance)

== Production ==
K Ramakanth, an associate of director Chandra Sekhar Yeleti, made his directorial debut with the film. The film was launched on 11 July 2018, and the launch was attended by several celebrities.

== Soundtrack ==
The soundtrack was composed by Srikanth Pendyala.

- Kavale - Aparna Nandan
- Anubavinchu - Prudhvi Chandran, Sweekar Agasthi
- Adigo - Gold Devaraj, Lipsika
- Cheliya - Yazin Nizar

== Reception ==
A critic from The News Minute wrote, "All in all, Edaina Jaragochu, the movie is such a bad mishmash that the title might as well apply to you, the audience". A critic from The Times of India rated the film 1.5/5 and wrote, "The first half of Edaina Jaragocchu seems a bit watchable, but the second half falls completely flat, making one just wait for the end titles to roll. Edaina Jaragocchu is a tiresome watch".
