= Bobby Simha =

Indian actor (born 1983)

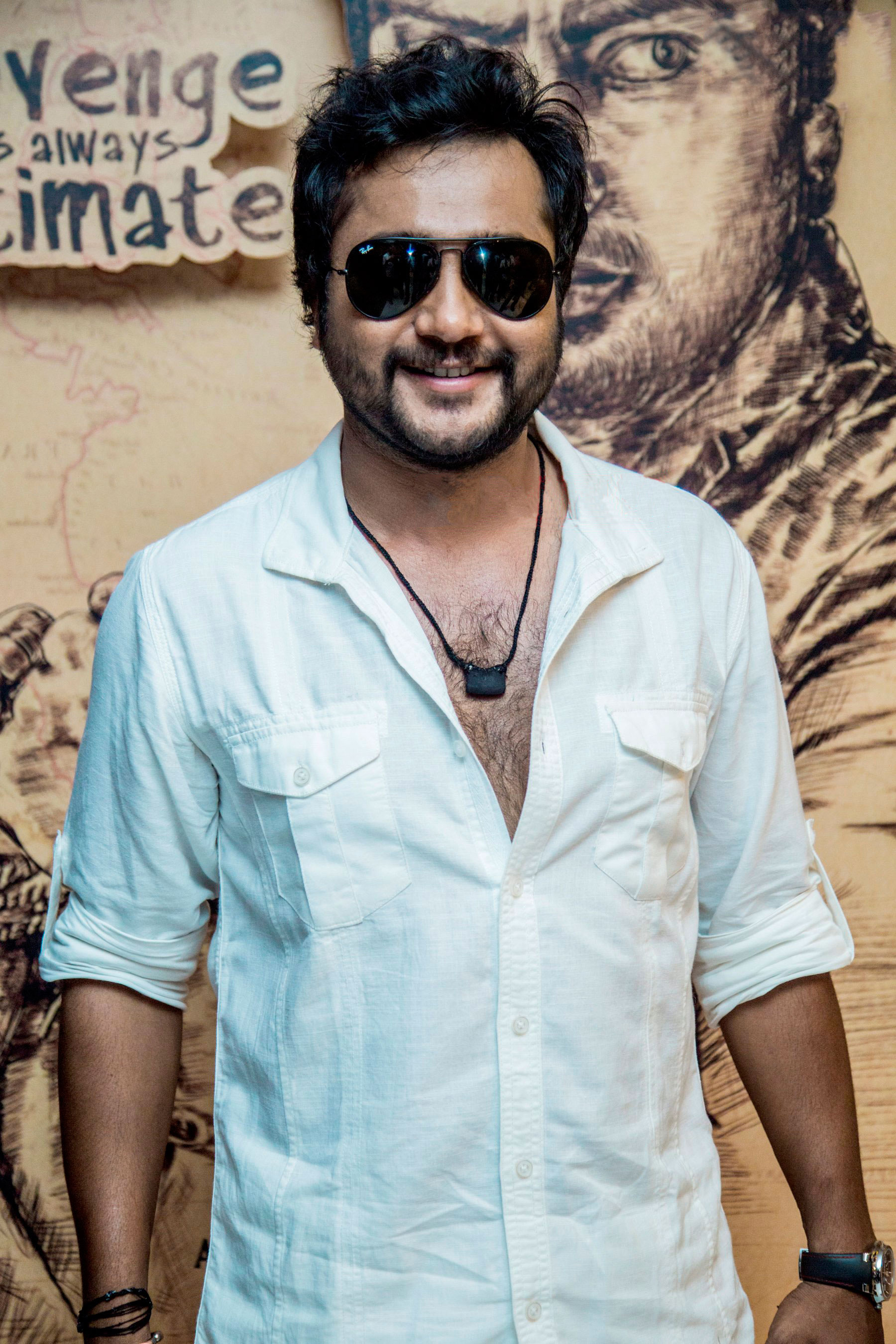
- Bobby Simha at the audio launch of Urumeen (2015)
- Born: Jayasimha; 6 November 1983 (age 42); Secundrabad, Andhra Pradesh, India (now in Telangana, India)
- Other name: Simha
- Occupation: Actor
- Years active: 2007–present
- Spouse: Reshmi Menon (m. 2016)
- Children: 2
- Relatives: Reshma Pasupuleti (Cousin)

Jayasimha (born 6 November 1983), better known as Bobby Simha, is an Indian actor who predominantly appears in Tamil, Telugu and Malayalam films. After making brief appearances in the films Kadhalil Sodhappuvadhu Yeppadi and Pizza (2012), he portrayed a kidnapper in Nalan Kumarasamy's Soodhu Kavvum and a comic villain in Alphonse Putharen's Neram. Simha's subsequent performance as the Madurai gangster Assault Sethu in Karthik Subbaraj's Jigarthanda (2014) won him critical acclaim and the National Film Award for Best Supporting Actor.

== Early life ==
Bobby Simha was born in a Telugu family on 6 November 1983 in Secundrabad, Andhra Pradesh (now Telangana). Simha's family is from Mopidevi, Krishna district, Andhra Pradesh but they moved to Kodaikanal in 1995. He subsequently completed his schooling at Priyadarshini Vidyalayam, a Telugu Medium School, in Mopidevi, Krishna District, Andhra Pradesh and then attended college at Pioneer College of Arts and Science in Coimbatore.

In 2005, he participated in a Coimbatore-based event called Naalaya Natchathiram, where chief guests Sundar C and E. Ramdoss suggested that he should attempt to become an actor in Tamil films. Simha stated that he received an offer to feature in a TV serial in Chennai and only after making the journey from Coimbatore, did he realise he had been conned. Simha subsequently finished his degree and came back to Chennai to pursue a career in acting but ended up working in marketing, insurance and business process outsourcing to fulfill his financial needs.

== Career ==
=== 2007–2012: Early work ===
Bobby Simha appeared in an uncredited role in Maya Kannadi (2007). Balaji Mohan, who was a short-film maker, gave him a small role in his first feature film, Kadhalil Sodhappuvadhu Yeppadi. Both ventures became critically acclaimed and amongst the most profitable of 2012. He subsequently became acquainted with short-film maker Manikandan, who introduced him to his friend, another short-film maker Karthik Subbaraj. The pair subsequently made a series of short films together, with Subbaraj giving Simha a role in his directorial debut Pizza, too.

=== 2013–2017: Critical acclaim ===
Simha then appeared in Soodhu Kavvum (2013) portraying the role of Pagalavan, and played the antagonist in the bilingual Neram, his performances in both films were received well. In 2014, he was seen in the role of an ageing Madurai gangster in Jigarthanda with his portrayal winning him critical praise. In an interview he said that in order to get into the character, he had interacted with real gangsters to learn their behaviour and nuances. To tan his skin, he stood in the sun at noon wearing only his shorts. The film opened to positive reviews in August 2014, with The Hindu writing that it had achieved "cult status" within a week of its release. Simha won positive reviews for his depiction of Sethu, with Rediff.com noting that Simha "steals the show. He is chillingly menacing at times, while completely hilarious in others, but equally convincing in both", stating it is "a truly remarkable performance". A critic from Sify.com delivered a similar verdict, writing "truly the film belongs to Simhaa. He is electrifying especially in the first half, where he brings out the viciousness and violent streak of the character along with that eerie laughter." His performance in the film earned him the National Film Award for Best Supporting Actor. After Jigarthanda he played a lead role in the Malayalam film Beware of Dogs, while in Aadama Jaichomada he played Bhoominathan, a "serious, intelligent cop but with a comic touch". The success of Jigarthanda had created opportunities for Bobby Simha to become a lead actor, though several of his subsequent films did not perform well commercially. In December 2015, he appeared in Urumeen, his first film as a solo action hero.

In 2016, he appeared in the coming-of-age drama, Bangalore Naatkal, where he portrayed a softer role in comparison to his earlier action films. Simha had offered his own dates to the producers to portray a character in the film, with his performance receiving mixed reviews. He play the role of a young and enthusiastic reporter in political thriller Ko 2. Director Karthik Subbaraj scripts a story of male arrogance in the multi-starrer Iraivi. In 2017, Susi Ganesan's Thiruttu Payale 2 is the sequel to the 2006 thriller film which went on to become a hit at the box-office.

=== 2018–present ===
He has signed to play as antagonist for Saamy Square (2018), which is the sequel of Saamy, directed by Hari.

Bobby Simah's first release of the year 2019 was Petta, in which he shared screen space with Rajinikanth. He later went on to do Agni Devi and Edaina Jaragocchu. In November 2019, Film Companion ranked Simha's performance in Jigarthanda among the 100 Greatest Performances of the decade.

In 2020, he played the antagonist with Ravi Teja's in Telugu movie Disco Raja. He was seen in Amazon Prime Video's Anthology Putham Pudhu Kaalai, where he played the lead role in Karthik Subbaraj's segment titled, Miracle. In 2022, Bobby Simha play in pivotal role with Vikram in Mahaan directed by Karthik Subbaraj exclusively on Prime Video. Later, Bobby Simha play a cameo for his debut in the Kannada film industry with Rakshit Shetty's 777 Charlie. In Telugu, he did Ammu (2022) for Amazon Prime and worked with Chiranjeevi in Waltair Veerayya (2023) where he plays the villain. He is also playing pivotal roles in Vallavanukkum Vallavan (2023) and the S. Shankar's, Indian 2 (2024) as a CBI officer with Kamal Haasan.

== Personal life ==
Bobby Simha got engaged to Urumeen co-star Reshmi Menon in November 2015, and they married on 22 April 2016. The couple has two children– a daughter (born 2017), and a son (born 2019).

== Filmography ==
- Note: he is credited as Simha / Simhaa in Tamil from 2012-2015 and 2020 to present.

Year	Title	Role	Language	Notes	Ref.
2007	Maya Kannadi	Barber customer	Tamil	Uncredited role	
2012	Kadhalil Sodhappuvadhu Yeppadi	Rashmi's boyfriend	Tamil	Credited as Jayasimha	
2012	Pizza	Bobby	Tamil		
2013	Naan Rajavaga Pogiren	Shankar Subramaniam	Tamil	Credited as Jaya Simha	
2013	Soodhu Kavvum	Pagalavan	Tamil		
2013	Neram	Vatti Raja	Malayalam	Bilingual film	
2013	Neram	Vatti Raja	Tamil	Bilingual film	
2014	Beware of Dogs	Amir	Malayalam		
2014	Jigarthanda	Assault Sethu	Tamil		
2014	Aadama Jaichomada	Inspector Bhoominathan	Tamil		
2014	Aaaah	Prosper	Tamil		
2015	Oru Vadakkan Selfie	John Mathew Bhaskar	Malayalam	Cameo appearance	
2015	Chennai Ungalai Anbudan Varaverkirathu	Chellapandi	Tamil		
2015	Masala Padam	Amudhan	Tamil		
2015	Inji Iduppazhagi	Himself	Tamil	Cameo appearance	
2015	Size Zero	Himself	Telugu	Cameo appearance	
2015	Urumeen	Selvaa	Tamil		
2016	Bangalore Naatkal	Kannan (Kutty)	Tamil	Also narrator	
2016	Aviyal	The Gangster	Tamil	Segment: Eli	
2016	Run	Vatti Raja	Telugu		
2016	Ko 2	Kumaran	Tamil		
2016	Meera Jaakirathai	Sivanesan	Tamil		
2016	Iraivi	Jagan	Tamil		
2016	Metro	Guna	Tamil		
2016	Kavalai Vendam	Arjun	Tamil		
2017	Mupparimanam	Himself	Tamil	Cameo appearance	
2017	Paambhu Sattai	Dakshna	Tamil		
2017	Karuppan	Kathir	Tamil		
2017	Thiruttu Payale 2	Inspector Selvam	Tamil		
2018	Rosapoo	Actor	Malayalam	Cameo appearance	
2018	Kammara Sambhavam	Pulikeshi	Malayalam		
2018	Saamy Square	Raavana Pichai	Tamil		
2018	Ladoo	Joseph Dayanidhi	Malayalam	Cameo appearance	
2019	Petta	Michael	Tamil		
2019	Agni Devi	Agni Dev IPS	Tamil		
2019	Edaina Jaragocchu	Kali	Telugu		
2020	Disco Raja	Burma Sethu	Telugu		
2020	Putham Pudhu Kaalai	Devan	Tamil	Segment: Miracle	
2021	Gully Rowdy	Ravi Nayak IPS	Telugu		
2022	Mahaan	Sathyavan Soosaiyappan	Tamil		
2022	777 Charlie	Vamsinadhan	Kannada	Cameo appearance	
2022	Ammu	Prabhu	Telugu		
2023	Waltair Veerayya	Solomon Caesar	Telugu		
2023	Vallavanukkum Vallavan	Alexander	Tamil	Also producer	
2023	Vasantha Mullai	Rudhran	Tamil		
2023	Thugs	Durai	Tamil		
2023	Salaar: Part 1 – Ceasefire	Bhaarava	Telugu		
2024	Razakar	Rajireddy	Telugu		
2024	Indian 2	Pramod Krishnaswamy	Tamil		
2026	Vaa Vaathiyaar	Burma	Tamil	Cameo appearance	
TBA	Bobby Simha25	Guru	Telugu; Tamil	Filming	
TBA	Non-violence		Tamil	Completed; Delayed	

=== Television ===
Year	Title	Role	Network	Notes	Ref
2018	Vella Raja	Deva	Amazon Prime Video		
2021	Navarasa	Nilavan	Netflix	Segment: Peace	
2022	Kaiyum Kalavum	Anna/Partner (Narrator)	Sony Liv	Voice only. Along with Chinmayi	

== Awards and nominations ==
Vijay Awards

- 2014 – Vijay Award for Best Villain – Jigarthanda

Filmfare Awards South

- 2014 – Filmfare Award for Best Supporting Actor – Tamil – Jigarthanda

National Film Awards

- 2014 – National Film Award for Best Supporting Actor – Jigarthanda

Tamil Nadu State Film Award Special Prize

- Best Actor – Jigarthanda

3rd South Indian International Movie Awards

- Nominated - Best Actor in a Supporting Role - Soodhu Kavvum
- Nominated - Best Actor in a Negative Role (Tamil) - Neram
- Nominated - Best Actor in a Negative Role (Malayalam) - Neram

4th South Indian International Movie Awards

- Nominated - Best Actor in a Negative Role (Tamil) - Jigarthanda

Edison Awards

- 2014 - Edison Award for Best Villain - Jigarthanda
