= Hyderabad Love Story =

2018 film

- Poster
- Directed by: Raj Satya
- Produced by: S. N. Reddy
- Starring: Rahul Ravindran; Reshmi Menon; Jiya Shankar
- Cinematography: B. V. Amarnadh Reddy
- Edited by: M. R. Varma
- Music by: Sunil Kashyap
- Production company: SNR Films India Pvt LTD
- Release date: 23 February 2018
- Running time: 140 minutes
- Country: India
- Language: Telugu

Hyderabad Love Story is a 2018 Indian Telugu-language romantic comedy film directed by Raj Satya and starring Rahul Ravindran, Reshmi Menon and Jiya Shankar. The film was ready for release in 2015, but only released in 2018.

== Plot ==
The story begins in Hyderabad where Karthik a rich guy who works in L&T company where Bhagyalakshmi a naive middle class girl works under him as an employee. Having a painful past Karthik is reserved towards girls which eventually attracts Bhagyalakshmi and starts have feelings towards him. Eventually Karthik also starts showing interest on her. But suddenly Karthik's ex Vaishnavi comes into picture warns Bhagyalakshmi that Karthik is a gay and shows a proof he was taking care a guy who is in the hospital.

Then Bhagyalakshmi became upset of these events tries to avoid Karthik all the time, then finally he confronts her then she expresses her doubts to him after understanding the facts Karthik became angry starts avoiding her. One day Bhagyalakshmi's father who had admitted in the same hospital where Karthik's friend taking care off. There she accidentally meets Dr.Gopal Rao who is Karthik's family friend shares her doubts with him. Then Gopal Rao reveals the actual facts.

The guy who is taken care by Karthik is Hyder Ali, who has a condition called sleep apnea. He was adopted by Karthik's father at his childhood on the insistence of Karthik. Later Ali and Karthik shares a close bond as brothers, later they shifts to Pune there Karthik starts dating with Vaishnavi who is very possessive towards him. Later, at one rainy night, he found his father died in his sleep at the same time Ali lived his breath in the sleep then the desperate Karthik starts doing CPR meanwhile Vaishnavi gives a sudden visit and misunderstoods him as a Gay and feels betrayed breaks up with him on the spot despite not listening Karthik's word anymore meanwhile with efforts of Karthik, Ali became conscious and listened their conversation pleads Vaishnavi to convince her but she went off with her car. Unknowing of the situation Ali chases her in the rain and meets with an accident and went into coma. Emotionally shaken from that day onwards Karthik became a reserved person.

After knowing the facts Bhagyalakshmi feels guilty for her foolish actions towards Karthik decides to propose him. Meanwhile Vaishnavi comes to Karthik and proposes him again to reconcile their relationship when he is about to say no to her. Bhagyalakshmi observes them misunderstands him again leaves abruptly. Later Karthik properly rejects Vaishnavi's proposal and decides to migrate Germany forever, and Ali's treatment was set up in Singapore he was ready to go for the treatment. After recovering from coma Ali meets Bhagyalakshmi and encourages her to propose Karthik or else it may leave forever. Bhagyalakshmi gives a failed attempt to reach out Karthik in the airport but however Karthik turns up to her in a road. Finally the film ends with Bhagyalakshmi proposes Karthik and they stay together.

== Cast ==
- Rahul Ravindran as Karthik
- Reshmi Menon as Bhagyalakshmi
- Jiya Shankar as Vaishnavi
- Kautilya as Hyder Ali
- Rao Ramesh as Dr. Gopal Rao
- Sana as Karthik's mother
- Surya as Karthik's father
- Ambati
- Rama Prabha
- Shafi
- Thagubothu Ramesh
- Shankar Melkote
- Dhanraj
- Rachcha Ravi

== Production ==
The film was announced in late 2014, but got delayed in production.

== Soundtrack ==
The music was composed by Sunil Kashyap. The audio was released in January 2015.

== Release and reception ==
The film released on 23 February 2018. The New Indian Express wrote that "Raj Satya’s Hyderabad Love Story was just like a mess created by a teen". A critic from Asianet praised the story and performance of the lead cast while criticising the comedy sequences.
