= Meera Jaakirathai =

2016 Indian film by R. G. Kesvan

- Directed by: R. G. Kesavan
- Written by: K. Mageswaran
- Produced by: Anthony Edward
- Starring: Surendar; Monica; Bobby Simha
- Cinematography: Veeramani
- Edited by: Shyjith Kumaran
- Music by: Raj
- Production company: White Screen Entertainment
- Release date: 27 May 2016
- Running time: 110 minutes
- Country: India
- Language: Tamil

Meera Jaakirathai (transl. Beware of Meera) is the 2016 Tamil-language horror film directed by R. G. Kesvan, produced by Anthony Edward, and written by K. Mageswaran. The film features Surendar, Monica, and Bobby Simha. The music for the film was composed by Raj with cinematography by Veeramani and editing by Shyjith Kumaran. The film, having been in production for six years, released on 27 May 2016 to negative reviews.

== Cast ==
- Surendar
- Monica
- Bobby Simha as Sivanesan
- Swaminathan
- Sri Priya
- Santhosh
- Joy
- Sanjay
- Ramalingam
- Eeswar
- Jothi
- Sakthivel
- Karthik
- Sakthi
- Ravi Arasan
- Erode Subramani
- Santhosh
- Mani
- Krishnamoorthy

== Production ==
In 2010, producer Kesavan decided to finance a film directed by Sathish, a contestant from the reality show Naalaiya Iyakkunar. Sathish subsequently selected his friend, Bobby Simha, then a small-time actor, to portray a negative role in the film. The shoot for the film was primarily completed in a week-long schedule at Tiruchengode. During the making of the film, Sathish and Bobby often disagreed with Kesavan and after an alcohol-fuelled incident, Kesavan reported Sathish to the police, following which the director left the project.

In May 2016, the production team suddenly started promoting the film through posters in newspapers, after having completed the film with extra scenes, involving actress Monica. After finding the promotional material, Bobby Simha complained to the Nadigar Sangam, claiming that he didn't recall starring in such a film and that the producers had used pictures from his previous film, Urumeen (2015). He had previously made similar claims against the makers of another film, Chennai Ungalai Anbudan Varaverkirathu (2015).

== Release ==
The film opened in May 2016 to negative reviews from critics and had a low profile release across Tamil Nadu. A critic from the New Indian Express stated what it is "appreciable is the effort the first-time director has put in", labelling it was a "horror-thriller crafted in the conventional way".
