= Gagino, Moscow Oblast =

Gagino Гагино
- Village
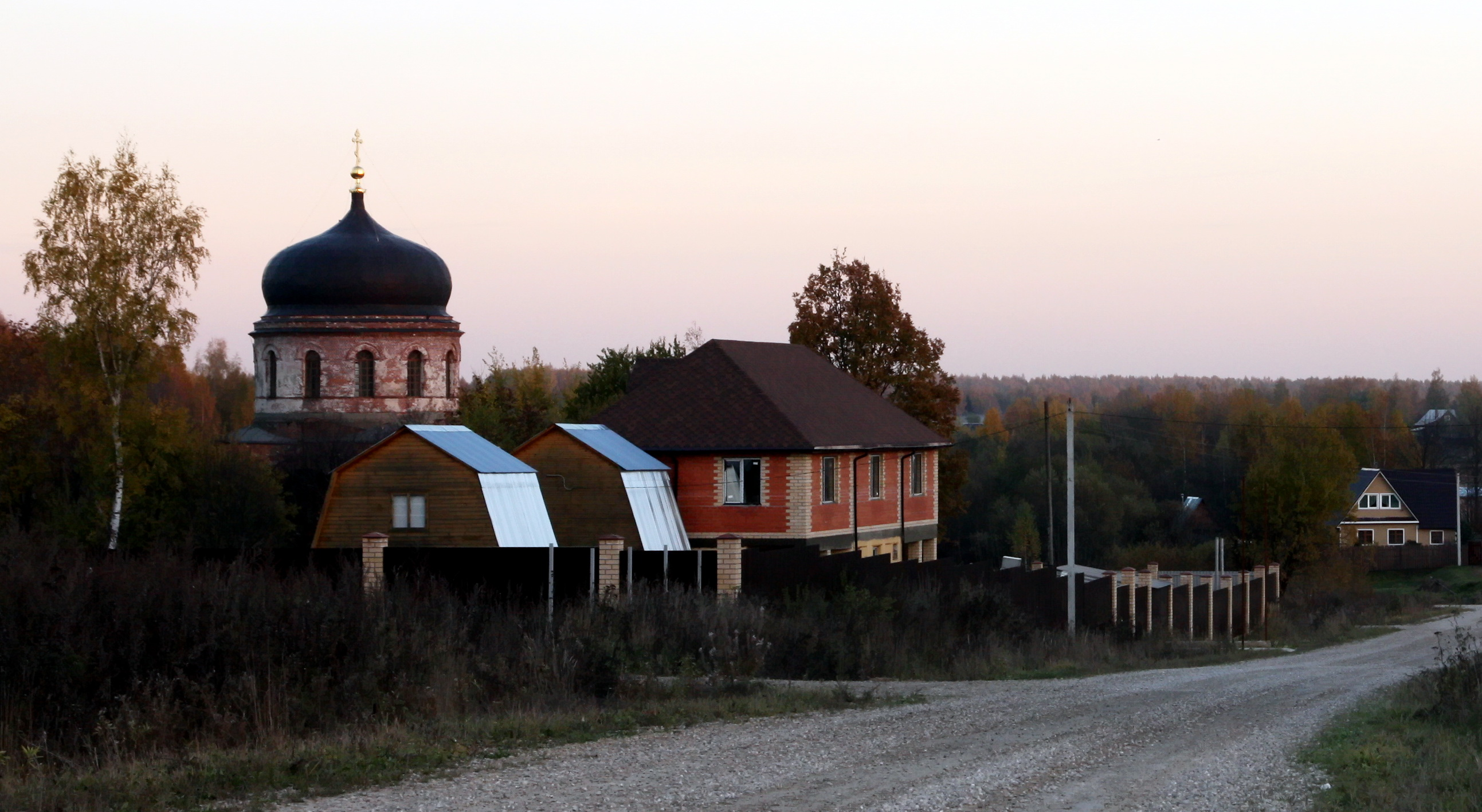
- Our Lady of Kazan church in Gagino
- Interactive map of Gagino
- Location of Gagino Gagino (Moscow Oblast)
- Coordinates: 56°21′00″N 38°21′54″E
- Country: Russia
- Federal subject: Moscow Oblast
- Administrative district: Sergiyevo-Posadsky District
- Rural settlementSelsoviet: Bereznyakovskoye Rural Settlement

Population
  - Estimate (2021): 11 )

Municipal status
  - Municipal district: Sergiyevo-Posadsky Municipal District
  - Rural settlement: Bereznyakovskoye Rural Settlement
- Time zone: UTC+3 (MSK)
- Postal code: 141313
- Dialing code: +7 496
- OKTMO ID: 46615406136

Gagino (Russian: Гагино) is a rural locality (a village in Sergiyevo-Posadsky District of Moscow Oblast, Russia.

It was first mentioned in 1462 as Timofeyevskoye (Тимофеевское). Today, it lacks substantial industry, agriculture and infrastructure and has a small population, with most houses used as summer cottages.

The major landmarks and the oldest structures preserved in Gagino are the All-Merciful Savior and Our Lady of Kazan churches with a ravaged and abandoned cemetery aside.

The All-Merciful Savior church is notable for Feodor Chaliapin's wedding, while Our Lady of Kazan church (colloquially called "Kazanskaya") annually serves as an offstage for the Chaliapin festival.
