= Raja Mohammad =

Indian film editor

- Born: Chennai, Tamil Nadu, India
- Occupation: Film editor
- Years active: 2003–present

Raja Mohammad is an Indian film editor, who works in the Tamil, Malayalam and Telugu film industries. He won the National Film Award for Best Editing for Paruthiveeran (2007).

== Career ==
Raja Mohammed primarily edited Malayalam films during his early career and his first Tamil venture was Kamal Haasan's production, Nala Damayanthi (2003). He won the National Film Award for Best Editing for his work in Paruthiveeran (2007); the honour fetched him further opportunities in the Tamil film industry. He also won the Vijay Award for Best Editor for his work in M. Sasikumar's directorial debut, the period film, Subramaniapuram (2008).

== Filmography ==
=== Tamil ===
- Nala Damayanthi (2003)
- Joot (2003)
- Udhaya (2004)
- Raam (2005)
- Manathodu Mazhaikalam (2006)
- Paruthiveeran (2007)
- Machakaaran (2007)
- Puli Varudhu (2007)
- Subramaniapuram (2008)
- Thenavattu (2008)
- Aval Peyar Thamizharasi (2010)
- Irumbukkottai Murattu Singam (2010)
- Kalavani (2010)
- Virunthali (2010)
- Mandhira Punnagai (2010)
- Markandeyan (2011)
- Potta Potti (2011)
- Mounaguru (2011)
- Bramman (2014)
- Amara (2014)
- Eetti (2015)
- Wagah (2016)
- Thiruttu Payale 2 (2017)
- Thorati (2019)
- Michaelpatty Raja (2021)
- Kasada Thapara (2021); Streaming release; Segment: Sadhiyaadal
- Sinam (2022)
- Va Varalam Va (2023)
- Padaiyaanda Maaveeraa (2025)

=== Malayalam ===
- Nakshathrakkannulla Rajakumaran Avanundoru Rajakumari (2002)
- Swapnam Kondu Thulabharam (2003)
- Chakram (2003)
- Kaazhcha (2004)
- Immini Nalloraal (2005)
- Thanmathra (2005)
- Madhuchandralekha (2006)
- Chakkara Muthu (2006)
- Palunku (2006)
- Avan Chandiyude Makan (2007)
- Romeoo (2007)
- My Big Father (2009)
- Chemistry (2009)
- April Fool (2010)
- Pranayam (2011)
- Innanu Aa Kalyanam (2011)
- Mamangam (2019)

=== Telugu ===
- Seethakoka Chiluka (2006)
