= Kadhal Paathai =

2012 Indian film by Vyaasan

- Directed by: Vyaasan
- Produced by: K. Venkatesh
- Starring: Vinod Kumar; Vidhya
- Cinematography: Ravi Srinivas
- Edited by: Siva
- Music by: S. S. Kumaran
- Production company: Sri Balaji Frames
- Release date: 24 February 2012
- Country: India
- Language: Tamil

Kadhal Paathai (transl. Love path) is a 2012 Indian Tamil-language romantic drama film directed by Vyaasan and starring debutante Vinod Kumar and Vidhya.

== Plot ==
In Kodaikanal, a shoemaker (played by Vinod Kumar) lives in the same area as a girl (played by Vidya) from a rich family who is staying at her grandmother's house and studying at a college. The shoemaker falls in love with to girl much to her father's despise. Her father sends goons to attack the shoemaker. Both the shoemaker and the girl flee to Agra.

== Cast ==
- Vinod Kumar
- Vidhya
- Mansoor Ali Khan as a drunkard
- Thalaivasal Vijay
- Sanjana Singh
- Sathyapriya
- Theepetti Ganesan
- Suman Shetty
- Tarzan
- Neelima Rani

== Production ==
The film is about a journey across twelve states from Kodaikonal to Agra. Debutante Vinod Kumar and Vidhya play the lead roles in the film. The film is a romantic film and the backdrop of Agra was chosen because the Taj Mahal is a symbol of love.

== Soundtrack ==
The songs are composed by S. S. Kumaran. FEFSI Siva, Srinivas, and Kalaipuli Sekar attended the audio launch.

All lyrics are written by Murugan Manthiram.

No.	Title	Singer(s)	Length
1.	"Om Manasula"	Koushik	2:45
2.	"Ennavo Nenjiley"	Mahathi	3:45
3.	"Neethan Neethan"	Koushik	4:28
4.	"Om Manasula"	Koushik, Sathya Nambirajan	2:46
Total length:			11:44

== Release ==
A critic from The Times of India wrote that "Kaadhal Paadhai is a romance-cum-road movie, but the best parts are neither the romance nor the road trip". A critic from Maalai Malar praised the cinematography and the music. A critic from Kungumam praised the performance of Mansoor Ali Khan.
