= Bayama Irukku =

- Theatrical release poster
- Directed by: Jawahar
- Produced by: Jawahar
- Starring: Santhosh Prathap; Reshmi Menon
- Cinematography: Mahendiran Jayaraju
- Edited by: Kamalakannan
- Music by: C. Sathya
- Production company: Vasantham Productions
- Release date: 22 September 2017
- Running time: 110 minutes
- Country: India
- Language: Tamil

Bayama Irukku (transl. It's scary!) is a 2017 Indian Tamil-language horror comedy film written and directed by Jawahar. It is an unofficial remake of the Thai film Pee Mak. The film features Santhosh Prathap and Reshmi Menon, with Kovai Sarala, Rajendran, Bharani, Jagan, and Lollu Sabha Jeeva in supporting roles. The music was composed by C. Sathya with editing done by Mahendran. The film began production and was completed by late 2015, but delays meant that it had a theatrical release on 22 September 2017.

== Plot ==
Jai leaves behind his pregnant wife Lekha at a town, in search of her parents in Sri Lanka. He was wounded during an attack when he tried to save fellow Tamil people, Raj, Ajith, Mani, and Shiva, who later became his best friends after he had saved them from a certain death.

Meanwhile, at home, Lekha struggled alone painfully to give birth to a baby; she calls out for help but is too weak to be heard. Shortly after, rumors started circulating the village that Lekha had died in labor and was now a ghost of a very powerful form haunting the house. The villagers in the neighborhood then heard her singing lullabies to her baby, terrifying them and forcing them to cower in fear.

When Jai and his friends arrive back to the town in the evening, they find the town completely silent. The five soon arrives at Jai and Lekha's house during the night, and Jai introduces Lekha to them. As it is now too dark to continue traveling, Jai's friends decide to stay. The following day, the men visit the village market but are shunned by the fearful community. A drunk villager attempts to shout out a warning to Jai but is forced down and hushed by her son. Jai's friends then discuss what they had heard but dismiss the rumors as ridiculous.

Ajith, however, while he was sent to fetch Jai, saw that the house was a dilapidated wreck that had not been maintained for months, that the baby cot that Jai and Lekha's son was supposed to be sleeping in, was rocking by itself, and then he saw Lekha extending her arm to an unnatural length to retrieve a dropped Apple under the house. The following day, Mani discovers a decomposed corpse behind the house wearing exactly the same ring as Lekha. The drunk villager who had also tried to warn them earlier also turned up mysteriously drowned. Soon, all four friends are convinced that she is a ghost. The friends then try numerous methods to convince Jai of the news, including a game of charades, and come within inches of being murdered by Lekha, with only Jai's presence preventing her from doing so, and she scares them away. Worse, Jai dismisses all of their warnings, proclaims that they are no longer his friends, and kicks them out of their accommodations.

Later, Jai and Lekha go out on a date in the town, visiting an amusement park. Jai's friends attempt to separate the two by kidnapping Jai, but their plans are foiled when Lekha discovers them and chases them away. Suddenly, during the getaway, Jai's wound reopens. His friends express surprise at how much blood has spilled, but Ajith and Mani become convinced that he, not Lekha, is the ghost, and their fears are seemingly confirmed when Jai reacts in pain when they attack him with holy rice. The friends then flee from their wounded friend and rescue Lekha. While escaping in a boat, Jai "returns" to them, walking into the river to them, but ends up almost drowning when he suffers cramps. As ghosts are not supposed to feel cramps, Jai is revealed to not have been a ghost, and he is rescued; when asked why he screamed when hit by the holy rice, he reveals that the rice had riddled his wound, making him yell out in pain.

In the following confusion, Raj drops a ring identical to the one Jai, Lekha, and the body behind the house had been wearing. Raj is immediately pronounced a ghost and kicked off the boat. The others then try to escape, but, as they had lost the paddles to the boat earlier, they cannot move. Lekha then somehow produces a soaking wet paddle and hands it to Mani, who suddenly recalls that all of them had been thrown overboard, and had already drifted too far away for a normal person to recover. Mani then stands up on the boat to look between his legs at the group; Lekha is revealed to have been the ghost all along, and the four remaining men, including Jai, retreat to a temple.

There, the men come under the protection of the local monk, armed with holy rice, holy water, and the temple is fortified with an enchanted "safety ring". Lekha quickly appears, in her terrifying ghostly form, and attacks. Initially, the holy "weapons" successfully keep Lekha at bay, but, in a panic, coupled with Jai's struggle to get back to his wife, all of the holy rice and water are wasted, and the monk was accidentally kicked out of the "safety ring". The monk then fled the temple, leaving the four, who had since destroyed the "safety ring" while trying to run, to face the angry Lekha. A pale Raj then reappears, and it was revealed that he is also human; he was in possession of the ring because he had stolen it off of the corpse behind the house to finance his gambling. Lekha angrily shouted at the five that she just wanted to be with her loved one, which the four friends argued against since they did not believe the living can be with the dead, and accuse her of killing the drunk; Lekha furiously denies her involvement and says that the drunk had drowned himself. Lekha, in a combination of sadness, anger, and desperation, then threatens to kill Jai and take him to live with her but stops when she sees how much she had been scaring her husband.

Jai then revealed that he knew the truth about Lekha all along, having had his suspicions raised during the game of charades. He had already looked at Lekha between his legs, which revealed her ghostly form, and found her decomposed corpse. However, even then, he is far more afraid of living without her than of her being dead. The two tearfully reconcile. His friends, seeing them reuniting, also tearfully reaffirm their friendship, and vow to never leave each other again. A flashback to Jai and Lekha's first meeting is shown.

In the credit scenes, Jai, Lekha, and his four friends live happily in the village. Lekha uses her supernatural abilities to do chores, play charades (and helping Mak win for the first time), scare off villagers who are attempting to drive her away (who are led by the village drunk's son), and even run the town's "haunted house" attraction. It is also revealed that her child also possesses some of her abilities, even though he is still an infant.

== Cast ==
- Santhosh Prathap as Jai
- Reshmi Menon as Lekha
- Kovai Sarala as Devi
- Bharani as Raj
- Rajendran as Ajith
- Jagan as Mani
- Lollu Sabha Jeeva as Shiva

== Production ==
Directed by debutant Jawahar and starring Santhosh Prathap and Reshmi Menon, the film completely shot in late 2015 in the interiors of Kerala, Chennai and Nagercoil. The horror comedy film, was said to feature Menon as a mother, while Rajendran and Kovai Sarala were also signed on for roles.

After a period of inactivity, in August 2016, the producers promoted the film by trending the hashtag "PeisNext" (Ghost's next film) on Twitter, before re-revealing that the film would be called Bayama Irukku. Following a further year of little promotion, the producers readied the film for a theatrical release in September 2017 and featured Bharani in the posters, following his popularity through his appearance in the Tamil reality television show, Bigg Boss.

== Soundtrack ==
Bayama Irukku

Soundtrack album by C. Sathya
- Released: 16 September 2017
- Recorded: 2017
- Genre: Soundtrack
- Length: 13:07
- Language: Tamil
- Label: Divo Music
- Producer: C. Sathya

C. Sathya chronology
Koditta Idangalai Nirappuga (2017)	Bayama Irukku (2017)	Pakka (2018)

The film's music was composed by C. Sathya, while the audio rights of the film was acquired by Divo Music. The album released on 16 September 2017 and featured four songs.

Track list
No.	Title	Lyrics	Singer(s)	Length
1.	"Mayile"	Viveka	Anthony Daasan	4:08
2.	"Eppavumae"	Viveka	Judah Sandy	3:50
3.	"Kannukkul"	Logan	Rita, Rahul Sathu, Bmac	3:30
4.	"Unnai Edhirparthen"	Viveka	Gowry Lekshmi	1:39
Total length:				13:07

== Release ==
The film had a low profile release at the box office on 22 September 2017, with critics giving the film negative reviews. The satellite rights of the film were sold to Zee Tamil.

== Reception ==
A critic from The Times of India wrote "for a horror comedy, Bayama Irukku is short on both scares and laughs" and that "the predictable script hardly displays any inventiveness and is content to assume that anything that Rajendran does will make audiences laugh". Sify.com stated there was "not even a single interesting scene" and that the film "neither frightens you nor evokes any laughter". Likewise, The New Indian Express wrote "Bayama Irruku doesn't fall under either horror or comedy category as the film fails at both scaring you and making you laugh".
