= Urumeen =

2015 Indian film by Sakthivel Perumalsamy

- Directed by: Sakthivel Perumalsamy
- Written by: Sakthivel Perumalsamy
- Produced by: G. Dillibabu
- Starring: Bobby Simha; Kalaiyarasan; Reshmi Menon
- Cinematography: Ravindranath Guru
- Edited by: San Lokesh
- Music by: Achu Rajamani
- Production company: Axess Film Factory
- Distributed by: Sri Thenandal Films
- Release date: 4 December 2015
- Running time: 142 minutes
- Country: India
- Language: Tamil
- Budget: ₹60 million (US$620,000)

Urumeen is a 2015 Indian Tamil-language fantasy action thriller film written and directed by debutante director Sakthivel Perumalsamy. It stars Bobby Simha, Reshmi Menon, and Kalaiyarasan. Produced by Axess Film Factory, the film has cinematography by Ravindranath Guru and music composed by Achu Rajamani. Urumeen is a revenge saga spanning across three generations. The film also uses Motion capture technology in a five-minute opening sequence.

The film was released theatrically in India on 4 December 2015, at the time of floods in Chennai. The makers took this decision to avoid any losses due to delays in release. The film was released theatrically in Malaysia on 11 December 2015 by Lotus Five Star Entertainment. Upon its release, the film received mixed-to-positive reviews from audiences. The film ran for two weeks at the box office, while its collections dropped drastically in the third week.

The film was later made available on legal digital streaming platforms Herotalkies and TentKotta on 30 June 2016 and on YuppTV on 7 July 2016. The film was also later released on DVD in Singapore by Lotus Five Star Entertainment. Later, it was also dubbed into Telugu as Raja Vijaya Simha and in Hindi as Hindustani Jaanbaaz in 2018.

== Plot ==
The film begins with the introduction of Raja Simhan, a historical warrior who stood and fought against the British government when it captured India. Still, he got betrayed by his own friend Karuna, due to which the British officers caught him and took him to be hanged. However, Raja Simhan managed to fight for his life and meet his teacher and friend Mohammad Bin Bashir, with whom he discussed his last wish: to be buried alive, to go away from this world filled with treachery. However, he is buried with a special book in his hands.

Then, the story moves to the present day when Raja Simhan gets reborn as Selva, an unemployed young man looking for a job. He comes to Chennai, where he starts living with his two male friends, who get him a job of his choice. He also happens to find his love Umayaal, and they come together. One day, she tells him that a man is trying to get close to him, which she does not like at all. Selva and his friend follow the man, who is later caught and suddenly burned to death. He does not realize that the man was earlier working for John, a goon and a businessman who betrayed Raja Simhan as Karuna. He finds a video footage of Selva and his friend following the man, who is actually John's brother, and this triggers a misunderstanding between the two when John thinks that Selva killed his brother. Selva is later kidnapped, where with the help of another man kidnapped, who actually burnt that man to death, manages to fight against all goons and escapes. He challenges John through his goon's phone to find him out.

The story then moves to AD 1939, when India was not free from the British, and a British officer's son had come to a village in South India for some days. He expresses his desire to have a translator. Then, Chezhiyan, the reincarnation of Raja Simhan, rather the second generation of Selva, and his friend Krishna, reborn as John, are called. Viduthalai, another good friend of Chezhiyan reborn as the security guy in Selva's office, joins him. Chezhiyan decides to interact but also makes it clear that he will not bend in front of him. Soon, Chezhiyan and the officer's son develop a feeling of enmity, which increases when Chezhiyan refuses to play chess with him and indeed hits him so hard that he loses one of his ears. Chezhiyan is brought to a field by Krishna, whose true colors are revealed later on that he had joined hands with the officer's son in exchange for power. Chezhiyan fights bravely but is severely injured and killed by the officer's son.

Selva realizes this thing while reading the book in a metro tunnel site. Suddenly, while reading the book, a liquid drops from the ceiling on the book, which results in various patterns being formed on the page. A furious Selva gets the indication and breaks a pipe, which results in several wires getting opened and killing John's men, who too were present along with him. Then, finally comes the turn of John, who picks up his gun to shoot Selva but gets killed when suddenly, a metal sheet comes flying and beheads him.

== Cast ==
- Bobby Simha as Selvakumar, Chezhian and Raja Simhan
- Kalaiyarasan as John Christopher, Krishnan Nair and Karuna
- Reshmi Menon as Umayaal Nandhini and Raja Simhan's wife
- Charle as Siva Lingam
- Manobala as Soundappan
- Appukutty as Security and Viduthalai
- Kaali Venkat as Sudanthiram alias Suda
- R. S. Shivaji as Venkat
- Sandra Amy as Jennifer
- Anthony Daasan
- Guru Lukman as Robert
- Karthik Yogi as Aadhi
- Gajaraj as Rajagopal and Kangani
- Veera Santhanam
- B. H. Tharun Kumar as Reddy
- Vinod Sagar

== Production ==
After having worked as a non linear editor and assistant director in few films, Sakthivel Perumalsamy wanted to direct a feature film, based on a real-life incident that took place from 1700 to 2015. In 2014, he first approached and discussed the story with Bobby Simha, whose short films he had seen. They waited to find good producers for the project, which therefore did not commence until March 2014. Simha took up the lead role in the film, his first after a number of supporting roles. His character, Selva, was a middle-class man who comes to Chennai from a small town to search for a job but gets into a problem, and he said that his character "exhibits two behaviours". While Kalaiyarasan landed the role of the villain. Kalaiyarasan later revealed that the director had initially asked him to play the hero but that he could not agree as he had other films lined up, while he called his character, John Christopher, "[not] entirely evil".

Over the next months, the film saw several changes in its principal cast and crew. Initially reported to be produced by Dr. L. Sivabalan under his Zero Rules Entertainment banner, the project was later known to be funded by G. Dillibabu's Axess Film Factory.

The film was shot across several South Indian states in locations including Chennai, Thekkady, Idukki, Ernakulam, Puducherry.Praveen B Menon was the production controller of this film

The film also used Motion capture technology in a few of its segments.

== Soundtrack ==
Urumeen

Soundtrack album by Achu Rajamani
- Released: 2015
- Recorded: 2015
- Genre: Feature film soundtrack
- Language: Tamil
- Label: Sony Music

The soundtrack of Urumeen was composed by Achu Rajamani.

Track listing
| No. | Title | Lyrics | Singer(s) | Length |
|---|---|---|---|---|
| 1. | "Baby Baby" | Mani Amudhavan | Anthony Daasan | 3:19 |
| 2. | "Hey Umayaal" | Kavin | Vijay Yesudas | 2:46 |
| 3. | "Siru Nadai" | Kavin | Karthik | 3:20 |
| 4. | "Yaadhum Oorae" | Kaniyan Poongunranar | Guna, Rohan Prakash, Kamala Rajagopal | 3:55 |
| 5. | "Siru Nadai (Reprise)" | Kavin | Roshni Suresh | 3:09 |
| 6. | "Hey Umayaal (Unplugged)" | Kavin | Kavya Ajit | 2:52 |

The soundtrack received positive responses. Behindwoods rated the soundtrack 3.25/5, calling it "A rock solid treat from Achu." Hindustan Times called the soundtrack a "Great mix of strong voices and arrangements."

== Promotion ==
A past and future prediction game titled Urumeen Predictions based on the film was released on 29 November 2015 by actor Arya, along with the cast of Urumeen at his house.

== Release ==
The film was released on 4 December 2015 despite heavy rain and floods in Chennai. The film was given a U/A certificate by the Indian Censor Board. The Singapore Censor Board rated the film PG13 on the account of some violence. The satellite rights of the film were sold to Kalaignar TV.

== Controversy ==
According to the sources, the trailer of Urumeen was denied a certificate, because of the tagline "Revenge is always ultimate". Due to this, the makers took it to the revising committee, which cleared the trailer with a U/A certificate.

== Reception ==
Urumeen received mixed responses from critics.

Only Kollywood rated the film 3.5/5, writing that " Urumeen serves quality thrills throughout." Baradwaj Rangan of The Hindu wrote, "For all its flash, Urumeen is a tedious, remote experience. We feel nothing, care for no one (especially the blink-and-miss heroine, played by Reshmi Menon) – and the film goes on and on."

== Box office ==
According to the site Behindwoods, the film had an average yet decent business in the first two weeks in Chennai alone and did a business of Rs.39,01,707. However, it was in the 3rd week, that the film's collections dropped in Chennai, and the total amount collected by the film at the Chennai Box Office was Rs.47,42,843. The fourth week settled for the Disappointment verdict, only at the Chennai Box Office.
