= Chaliapin festival, Gagino =

Annual music festival in Gagino, Moscow Oblast, Russia

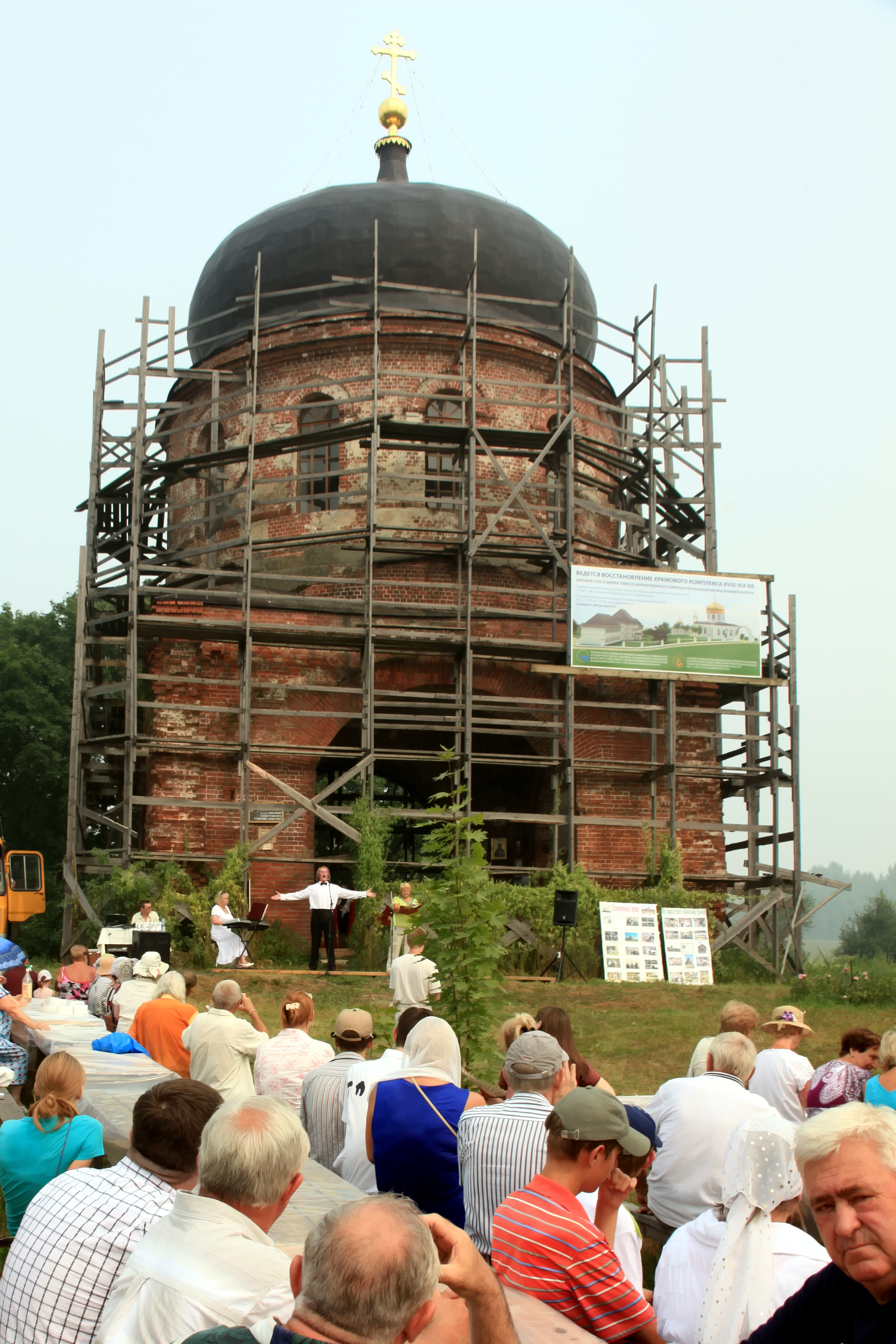
Chaliapin Festival 2010

The Chaliapin festival is an annual open-air vocal event in Gagino village, Moscow region. The idea of the festival was inspired by the story of Chaliapin's marriage with a young Italian ballerina Iola Tornagi in Gagino's church of All-Merciful Savior on July 27, 1898.
Launched in July 2002 to commemorate the remarkable wedding, the festival was at first an amateur concert of locals. However its publicity was soon fueled by a documentary "Marriage in Putyatino". The film by Dmitriy Stepanov a film director from nearby Sergiyev Posad was dedicated to Chaliapin's wedding and a joyful party which followed the ceremony at the couple friend's villa in Putyatino few kilometers from Gagino. Once shown on the Russian local and federal channels the film has made the place and the festival public.
Last years the festival stars the voices of the Bolshoi Theatre, Stanislavski music theatre, numerous professional and amateur musicians, including the locals. The event's repertory features the best of Chaliapin's legacy mixed with some folk and classical complements.
The organizing functions are shared among the locals, Interregional Chaliapin Center and the parish of the Gagino's churches.
