= Lineman (2024 multilingual film) =

Indian comedy drama film

- Theatrical release poster in Kannada
- Directed by: Raghu Shastry
- Written by: Raghu Shastry
- Produced by: Yateesh Venkatesh; Ganesh Papanna
- Starring: Thrigun; Kaajal Kunder; B. Jayashree; Harini Shreekanth
- Cinematography: Shanthi Sagar H. G.
- Edited by: L. Raghunatha
- Music by: Manikanth Kadri
- Production company: Purple Rock Entertainers
- Release date: 22 March 2024
- Country: India
- Languages: Kannada; Telugu

Lineman is 2024 Indian comedy drama film written and directed by Raghu Shastry and starring Thrigun and B. Jayashree. Shot simultaneously in Kannada and Telugu, the film was produced by Yateesh Venkathesh and Ganesh Papanna under the banner of Purple Rock Entertainers.

== Cast ==
- Thrigun as Natesha "Nata" / Nataraj "Nattu"
- Kaajal Kunder
- B. Jayashree as Sharadamma / Devudamma
- Harini Shreekanth
- Anjali
- Chethan Gandharva
- Gowravshetty
- Dileep Kempegowda
- Sandeep Kempegowda
- Suhail Rasool
- Mico Nagaraj
- Niviksha Naidu
- Samarth Narsimraju
- Sujay Shastry
- Apporva Shree
- Shridatta

== Release ==
The initial theatrical release date of the film was 15 March 2024 but later postponed to 22 March 2024.

The film is available for streaming on Amazon Prime Video.

== Reception ==
Sridevi S. of The Times of India rated the film three out of five stars and said "The movie can be enjoyed in theatres just to get a glimpse of village life, sans gadgets and electricity". A. Sharadhaa of The New Indian Express rated the film three out of five stars and said "Lineman transcends the boundaries of conventional cinema, offering viewers a thought-provoking journey into the heart of human existence. It serves as a reminder of the importance of human connection, urging audiences to reevaluate their relationship with the world around them".

Jagadish Angadi of Deccan Herald rated the film four out of five stars and said "Thrigun and B Jayashree deliver a nuanced performance. All other artistes have done justice to their roles". Shashiprasad S M of Times Now rated the film 3 stars out of 5 stars and said "Forget entertainment, this film needs to be watched just for the powerful message that it comes with. It rings the alarm bells on how humans have got their priorities wrong and also underlines the fact that we all need to live rather than merely exist with the assistance of technology".
