= Thrigun =

Indian actor

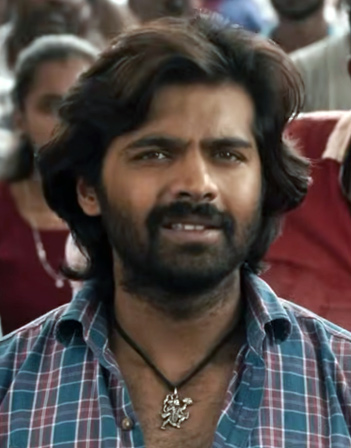
- Thrigun in 2024 film Lineman
- Born: Arun Eswaran; Chennai, India
- Occupation: Actor
- Years active: 2009–present
- Spouse: Niveditha (m. 2023)

Thrigun is an Indian actor who has appeared in supporting roles in Telugu and Tamil language films.

== Early life ==
Thrigun was born as the only son to his parents and did his schooling in Vizag and pursued journalism in Madras Christian College.

== Career ==
Thrigun met Prakash Raj during an audition for Inidhu Inidhu, the Tamil version of the 2007 Telugu film Happy Days, which Prakash Raj had been producing. Through Prakash Raj, he was able to meet other producers and was signed on to play the male protagonist in the 2009 Telugu thriller film Katha. The film also featured Genelia D'Souza and won critical acclaim upon release, with a critic noting that he made a "fairly competent" debut. In 2010, he was signed by Narayan Nagendra Rao to star in Maalai Pozhudhin Mayakathilaey alongside Regina Cassandra, his co-star in the short film Kadhalil Sodhappuvadhu Eppadi. However, the pair was replaced by Aari and Shubha Phutela after a delay in production. Inidhu Inidhu released only in 2010 and was a box office failure with very little publicity during release, and his next Tamil film Theneer Viduthi (2011) faced a similar response.

His next release in Telugu was Weekend Love in 2014 which was a disaster garnering lukewarm response. His much anticipated Telugu film Tungabhadra produced by Sai Korrapati was released in March 2015 and sunk without a trace despite earning him positive reviews. In 2017, he starred in Yupp TV Web Series Mana Mugguri Love Story, alongside Telugu stars Navdeep and Tejaswi Madivada. The series received positive response and was a success.

== Filmography ==
=== Films ===
Year	Title	Role	Language	Ref.
2009	Katha	Krishna	Telugu	
2010	Inidhu Inidhu	Siddharth	Tamil	
2011	Theneer Viduthi	Kumaran	Tamil	
2014	Weekend Love	Ganesh	Telugu	
2015	Tungabhadra	Srinu	Telugu	
2015	Thangamagan	Aravind	Tamil	
2015	L7	Arun	Telugu	
2017	PSV Garuda Vega	Niranjan Iyer	Telugu	
2018	Manasuku Nachindi	Abhay	Telugu	
2018	24 Kisses	Anand	Telugu	
2019	Podhu Nalan Karudhi	Kannan	Tamil	
2019	Chikati Gadilo Chithakotudu	Chandu	Telugu	
2020	Thagite Thandana	Mr. B	Telugu	
2021	Dear Megha	Aadi	Telugu	
2021	WWW	Vishwa	Telugu	
2022	When The Music Changes		Telugu	
2022	Katha Kanchiki Manam Intiki	Prem	Telugu	
2022	Konda	Konda Murali	Telugu	
2022	Cadaver	Vetri	Tamil	
2022	Premadesam	Arjun	Telugu	
2024	Devil	Roshan	Tamil	
2024	Line Man	Natesha "Nata" / Nataraj "Nattu"	Kannada; Telugu	
2024	Udvegam	Mahendra	Telugu	
2024	Manamey	Anurag	Telugu	
2025	Jigel		Telugu	
2025	Eesha	Kalyan	Telugu	
2026	Sweety Naughty Crazy	Shiva	Tamil	
2026	Moondram Kan	Prakash	Tamil	
2026	Chennai Love Story	Ajay	Telugu	

=== Television ===
Year	Title	Role	Network
2017	Mana Mugguri Love Story	Rishi	
2021	11th Hour	Peter D Cruz	Aha
2026	Bigg Boss Season 10 Telugu	Thrigun (himself)	
