= Gagino =

Gagino (Russian: Гагино) is the name of several rural localities in Russia:

- Gagino, Lipetsk Oblast, a selo in Topovsky Selsoviet of Lev-Tolstovsky District of Lipetsk Oblast
- Gagino, Moscow Oblast, a village in Bereznyakovskoye Rural Settlement of Sergiyevo-Posadsky District of Moscow Oblast
- Gagino, Nizhny Novgorod Oblast, a selo in Gaginsky Selsoviet of Gaginsky District of Nizhny Novgorod Oblast
- Gagino, Ryazan Oblast, a village in Tyrnovsky Rural Okrug of Pronsky District of Ryazan Oblast
