= Poo (film) =

2008 film directed by Sasi

- Theatrical release poster
- Directed by: Sasi
- Screenplay by: Sasi
- Story by: S. Tamilselvan
- Produced by: Moser Baer
- Starring: Srikanth; Parvathy
- Cinematography: P. G. Muthiah
- Edited by: Mathan Gunadeva
- Music by: S. S. Kumaran
- Production companies: Moser Baer Entertainment; Nesagee Cinemas
- Release date: 28 November 2008
- Country: India
- Language: Tamil

Poo (transl. Flower) is a 2008 Indian Tamil-language romantic drama film co-written and directed by Sasi, based on the short story, Veyilodu Poi written by Thamizh Selvan. The film, produced by Moser Baer and Nesagee Cinemas, stars Srikanth and Parvathy Thiruvothu (in her Tamil film debut) in the lead roles. The music was composed by S. S. Kumaran with cinematography by P. G. Muthiah and editing by Mathan Gunadeva. The film was released on 28 November 2008 to positive reviews, and won several awards.

== Plot ==
The film is set in a village named Imbutakam, located between Rajapalayam and Sivakasi in southern Tamil Nadu. It entails two different dreams for one person. The main aspects of this film are the selfless, deep love and admiration that Maari develops for her cousin Thangarasu, and the love and expectations of a poor, hardworking father for his son, Thangarasu.

The film begins showing Maari happily married to her husband Karuppasamy, a small shop owner. She leads an uncomplaining life with a smile on her face at all shades of events, which fascinates even Karuppasamy. One day, she leaves alone for her village festival with the permission of Karuppasamy, who promises that he will follow her there after his business for the day has finished. When her mother asks why Maari came alone, she replies that she came early to see Thangarasu, much to her mother's dismay.

On her way to see Thangarasu, she begins to reminisce about her past that includes her bold proclamation of her aim to be Thangarasu's wife from her school days (a time when they used to play together) that develops into her shy, unrequited yearning for him in her teenage years (a time when Thangarasu is an engineering student, while Maari works as a laborer in her village's fireworks company along with her best friend Cheeni, a practical girl who at first advises Maari to be realistic, but later, seeing her passion for Thangarasu, helps her out in many ways as she could). By that time, everyone in Maari's village knows about her ardent love for Thangarasu except for Thangarasu himself. After many attempts, she fails to confess her love to him or even to talk to him openly without feeling shy, even when he is away in the city or in her village. However, Thanagarasu comes to realize her love after many incidents in which people he knows tell him about it.

At the same time, the film shows Thangarasu's father working as a cart driver and carrying laborer. He expects respect for his age from his young bosses and colleagues, but after an unpleasant incident, he presumably thinks that being rich and owning modern items, such as a car, will bring him respect. He takes pride in the fact that his son is studying to be an engineer and dreams big for him. However, Thangarasu breaks his castle in the sky by saying that once he starts working, unless he joins a renowned company, his salary will be merely Rs. 6000, not as large as Rs. 35000 as software engineers earn, as he is just a mechanical engineer. This shatters the dreams of Thangarasu's father, who then resorts to alcohol and deems that he will never achieve the respect that he yearns for.

Thangarasu's father is against the idea of Thangarasu marrying Maari, as he believes that one cannot live happily and with respect on one's own through higher education alone, but with money. Thangarasu, though initially moved by Maari's faithful passion, begins to reciprocate her feelings. However, after learning that the son of his best friend, who had married his cousin, had birth defects, he found it not a good idea to marry someone related by blood. Therefore, he heartbreakingly agrees to marry the proposed daughter of a wealthy family his father approves of, thus choosing his father's dream. Maari also agrees to marry someone else on the condition that her mother and brother attend Thangarasu's wedding, since they initially refused to go after learning that Thangarasu would not marry Maari. Maari happily marries, wishing that Thangarasu and his wife become successful and that Thangarasu be happy, just as she will try to be with Karuppasamy.

At present, Maari enters Thangarasu's house and sees a car parked outside, while Thangarasu talks on the phone about business matters. Seeing her come, he directs her to go inside. She comes into the house and sees it decorated with the latest modern devices. Nothing makes her happier than seeing Thangarasu's wedding photo hung on the wall. She sees Thangarasu's wife in the backyard, sitting on a chair and reading a novel. She goes up to her and talks to her. Initially, she seems nice, but she later sneers at the question of a possible pregnancy, shocking Maari.

Maari later witnesses in a hidden place that Thangarasu's wife treats him badly and shames him for marrying her, a rich woman, shamelessly, when he himself is poor. Though begging his wife to stop shouting, fearing that Maari may hear it, and knowing that Maari still lives for him and that hearing this will terribly traumatize her, Thangarasu sees that she is hiding, listening to all of this with tears in her eyes. He then goes to his room with a shattered heart, while Maari runs away and meets Thangarasu's father outside. Seeing his arrogant daughter-in-law outside and his crying son inside, he is also heartbroken. He tells Maari that both of them had dreams they wanted, but he did not stop to hear the girl's dream, implying that if it were not for him, Thangarasu would not be in this unhappy marriage.

Maari flees from the scene and departs with her belongings back on the way she came, just as Karuppasamy touches his feet into the village. He discovers Maari, too shocked to understand what had happened, sitting on a tree stump, emotionless. Upon hearing no answer from Maari about why she is here and not at her home, he shakes her, and she starts wailing out loud, showing that her seemingly happy life with Karuppasamy was based on the hope that Thangarasu was also leading a happy life. Since he is not, it seems that she will lament for the rest of her life, knowing the sadness and pain of her lover, whom she cannot console.

== Cast ==
- Srikanth as Thangarasu
- Parvathy Thiruvothu as Maari
- Maila as young Maari
- Inigo Prabhakaran as Karuppasamy (Maari's husband)
- Ram as Thangaraasu's father
- Inbanila as Cheeni
- Ashwanth Thilak as Thangarasu's friend
- Kandasamy as Tea shop owner
- Periya Karuppu Thevar
- Paravai Muniyamma

== Production ==
In January 2007, Sasi announced that he would collaborate again with Srikanth in a project titled Imm and the pair spent a year working on the pre-production work of the film. Sasi shelved the venture and chose to make his next film, Poo (Flower), after being inspired by the romantic short story of Veyilodu Poi written by Thamizh Selvan, noting that the effect that the story had on him was "mind-blowing" and decided that he had "to take the story to everyone". He chose to utilise a new technical team for the project, choosing to sign up S. S. Kumaran and P. G. Muthiah for the music and cinematography respectively, with the pair both passing a selection interview set up by Sasi. Srikanth was retained and the director worked on toning down the actor's complexion, while Malayalam actress Parvathy Thiruvothu was selected to play the lead role in the film, and also went through a similar character acclimatisatio procedure.

== Soundtrack ==
The soundtrack features 6 tracks, composed by debutant S. S. Kumaran. The soundtrack was released on 25 September 2008 in a launch event with the special guest being film director Ameer.

Poo

Soundtrack album by S. S. Kumaran
- Released: 25 September 2008
- Recorded: 2008
- Genre: Soundtrack
- Length: 32:07
- Language: Tamil
- Label: Sony BMG
- Producer: S. S. Kumaran

S. S. Kumaran chronology
Poo (2008)	Kalavani (2010)

No.	Title	Lyrics	Singer(s)	Length
1.	"Choo Choo Maari"	Na. Muthukumar	Mridula, Srimathi Parthasarathy	5:25
2.	"Maman Engirukka"	Na. Muthukumar	Harini, Tippu, Karthik, Master Rohith	5:15
3.	"Aavaram Poo"	Na. Muthukumar	Chinmayi	5:00
4.	"Dheena"	Na. Muthukumar	Shankar Mahadevan, Hemambiga	5:24
5.	"Sivakasi Rathiyae"	S. Gnanakaravel	Periya Karuppu Thevar	5:29
6.	"Paasa Mazhai"	S. Gnanakaravel	S. S. Kumaran	5:34

== Release and reception ==
Poo received positive reviews. A Behindwoods critic noted "the one man who deserves an ovation here is director Sasi", "handling the story, screenplay, dialogue and direction, he has given a product that will please all true lovers of cinema and he must also be credited with extracting moving performances from the cast." A reviewer from Rediff.com wrote "as far as screenplays and performances go, Sasi has a winner on his hands. Few rural sagas are this refreshing or poetic." Shanthi of Kalki praised director for making a realistic film, Kumaran's music while also praising for choosing perfect cast for characters though felt Srikanth struggles in the role and director messed up in portraying childhood and concluded calling the flower with less smell.

The film subsequently won accolades at several regional award ceremonies such as the 56th Filmfare Awards South, Vijay Awards and the Tamil Nadu State Film Awards, where it won recognition including a special mention in the Best Film category as another for portraying women in good light. The film was also screened across international film festivals, notably at the Los Angeles Indian Film Festival, and won Sasi the Best Director award in Ahmedabad International Film Festival.

== Awards and nominations ==
2008 Ahmedabad Film Festival

- Won – Best Film – Moser Baer
- Won – Best Director – Sasi

2008 Tamil Nadu State Film Awards

- Won – Best Film Portraying Woman in Good Light – Moser Baer
- Won – Best Storywriter – Tamizhchelvan

2008 Vijay Awards

- Won – Vijay Award for Best Debut Actress – Parvathy Thiruvothu
- Nominated – Best Director – Sasi
- Nominated – Best Editor – Madan Gunadeva
- Nominated – Vijay Award for Best Actress – Parvathy Thiruvothu
- Nominated – Best Make Up – Shanmugham & Manohar

2008 56th Filmfare Awards South

- Won – Filmfare Award for Best Actress – Tamil- Parvathy Thiruvothu

2008 Ananda Vikatan Awards

- Won – Best Film – Moser Baer
- Won – Best Actress – Parvathy Thiruvothu
- Won – Best Supporting Actor – Ramu
- Won – Best Storywriter – S. Tamizhchelvan

Makkal TV Awards Makkal

- Won – Best Film – Moser Baer

Jaya TV Awards

- Won – Best Film – Moser Baer
- Won – Best Music Director

Popular Film Awards

- Won – Best Film – Moser Baer
- Won – Best Director – Sasi

=== Screened at Festivals ===
  - Chennai International Film Festival
  - Ahmedabad Film Festival
  - Norway Film Festival
  - Los Angeles Indian Film Festival
  - Official Selection at the Indian Panorama
