= S. S. Kumaran =

Indian music composer and director

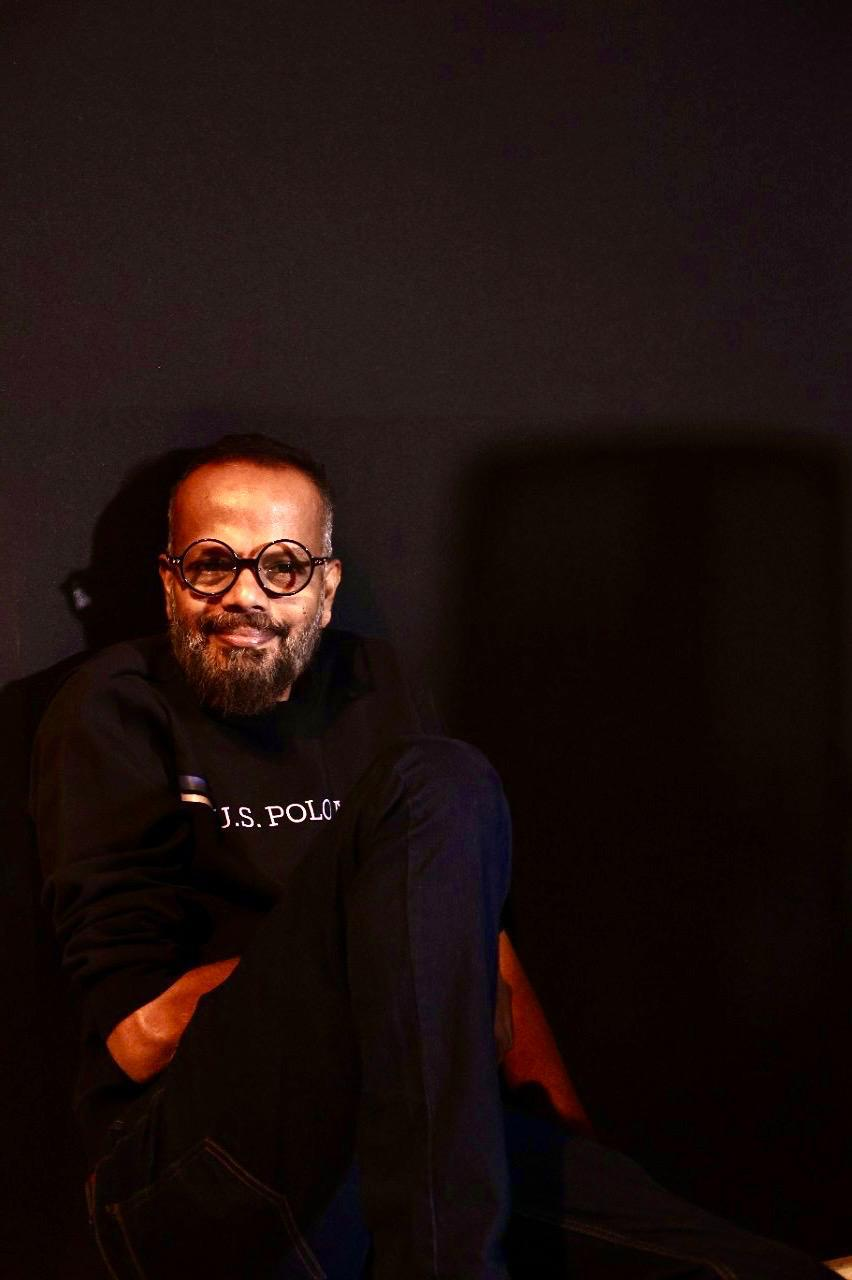
- Born: Valliyur, Thirunelveli district, Tamil Nadu
- Occupations: Director, music composer
- Years active: 2008-present

S. S. Kumaran is an Indian music composer and director. He made his debut as composer with Poo. He also directed two films Theneer Viduthi (2011) and Kerala Nattilam Pengaludane (2014).

== Early life and career ==
Kumaran belong to the Valliyur village in Thirunelveli district. His childhood ambition is to become a music director. Since his dad was a headmaster, his parents were not in approval for his aspirations in cinema. They had a negative approach towards cinema. He convinced his dad and joined the Film institute to pursue his dreams to become a music director. He finished his course in Photography. He composed 3 songs and showed it to director Sasi who was impressed and provided him opportunity to compose for his film Poo. The film received critical acclaim while his music was praised, all the songs were received well especially "Choo Choo Maari".

== Filmography ==
Year	Film	Credited as		Notes
Year	Film	Director	Music Director	Notes
2008	Poo	✗	✓	
2010	Kalavani	✗	✓	
2010	Nellu	✗	✓	
2010	Virunthali	✗	✓	
2011	Theneer Viduthi	✓	✓	
2012	Kadhal Paathai	✗	✓	
2014	Kerala Nattilam Pengaludane	✓	✓	
2016	Pattathaari	✗	✓	
2026	Heart Star	✓	✓	Under Production

As an actor

- Aval Peyar Thamizharasi (2010)
- Yathumaagi (2010)
- Ayyanar (2010)
