= Jayaprakash filmography =

The following is the filmography of Indian actor and producer Jayaprakash.

== Filmography ==
=== Tamil films ===
List of Tamil film credits
Year	Title	Role	Notes	Ref.
1995	Thondan		Uncredited role	
2007	Maya Kannadi			
2008	Velli Thirai	Producer		
2009	Pasanga	Chokkalingam		
2009	Laadam	Vembuli		
2009	Naadodigal	Pazhanivel Raman		
2010	Theeradha Vilaiyattu Pillai	Ranganathan		
2010	Thillalangadi	Nisha's father		
2010	Vamsam	Seenikannu Devar		
2010	Naan Mahaan Alla	Prakasam		
2010	Vandae Maatharam	Dr. Nayem		
2010	Ayyanar	Prabha's father		
2010	Bale Pandiya	Vannaiyar		
2011	Aadukalam	Irene's relative		
2011	Yuddham Sei	Dr. Judas		
2011	Vaanam	Mansoor Khan		
2011	Eththan	DK		
2011	Pillaiyar Theru Kadaisi Veedu	Ganesh's father		
2011	Rowthiram	Udaya Murthy		
2011	Sagakkal	Varadhan		
2011	Uyarthiru 420	Jagan Pattabhiraman		
2011	Mankatha	Arumuga Chettiyar		
2011	Muran	Devarajan		
2011	Poraali	Doctor		
2011	Rajapattai		Special appearance	
2012	Marina	School Owner	Guest appearance	
2012	Muppozhudhum Un Karpanaigal	Dr. Rudhran		
2012	Kazhugu	Ayya		
2012	Mye			
2012	Aarohanam	MLA		
2012	Yaarukku Theriyum	Vishwanath		
2013	Samar	Joseph Kuriyan		
2013	14/6: A Day For Humanity	Doctor	Short film	
2013	Vatthikuchi	Gangariya		
2013	Chennaiyil Oru Naal	Vishwanathan		
2013	Ethir Neechal	J. Prakash		
2013	Thulli Vilayadu	Samipillai		
2013	Aadhalal Kadhal Seiveer	Shwetha's father		
2013	Moodar Koodam	Bhakthavatsalam		
2013	Thagaraaru	Kandhuvatti Rajendran		
2013	Biriyani	Sampath		
2014	Pannaiyarum Padminiyum	Pannaiyar		
2014	Bramman	JK		
2014	Idhu Kathirvelan Kadhal	Pavithra's father		
2014	Vallinam	Krishnamurthy		
2014	Thegidi	Raghuram		
2014	Naan Sigappu Manithan	Meera's father		
2014	Thalaivan			
2014	Oru Kanniyum Moonu Kalavaanikalum	Dr. Subhash		
2014	Pongadi Neengalum Unga Kadhalum	Police commissioner		
2014	Nalanum Nandhiniyum	Duraipandi		
2014	Megha	Jayakumar		
2014	Vanavarayan Vallavarayan	Anjali's father		
2014	Yaan	Anwar Ali		
2014	Poojai	Ramaswamy		
2014	Lingaa	Corrupt government officer		
2015	Kanchana 2	Marudhu		
2015	JK Enum Nanbanin Vaazhkai	Padmanabhan		
2015	Aivarattam			
2015	36 Vayadhinile	Textile shop owner		
2015	Masss	Kothandaram Reddy		
2015	Indru Netru Naalai	Rajarathinam		
2015	Thani Oruvan	Mahima's father		
2015	Paayum Puli	Lakshmi Narayanan		
2015	Eetti	Subramaniam		
2015	Thanga Magan	Prakash Kumar		
2015	Vellaiya Irukiravan Poi Solla Maatan	Ramalingam		
2015	Pasanga 2		Guest appearance	
2016	Kathakali	Textile mill owner		
2016	Navarasa Thilagam	Thangadurai		
2016	Mapla Singam	Sailaja's father		
2016	Aagam	Sriram		
2016	Adida Melam			
2016	Vaaliba Raja	Ramachandran		
2016	Idhu Namma Aalu	Shiva's father		
2016	Muthina Kathirika			
2016	Nambiar	Ramachandran's father		
2016	Nayagi	Gayatri's father		
2016	Kaththi Sandai	Union Minister		
2017	Singam 3	Ramakrishna		
2017	Shivalinga	Sathya's father		
2017	Ivan Yarendru Therikiratha	Arivu's father		
2017	Thiri	Jeeva's father		
2017	Enbathettu	Raghuvaran		
2017	Paakanum Pola Irukku			
2017	Thupparivaalan	Ram Prasad		
2017	Spyder	Shiva's father		
2017	En Aaloda Seruppa Kaanom	Sandhya's father		
2017	Maayavan	Velayudham		
2017	En Magan Magizhvan	Dr Ram		
2018	Mannar Vagaiyara	Rajangam		
2018	Kaali	Father John		
2018	Tik Tik Tik	Mahendran		
2018	Maniyaar Kudumbam	Magizhampoo's father		
2018	Kalari	Siddique		
2018	Genius	Doctor		
2019	Thirumanam	Vijayakumar		
2019	Airaa	Yamuna's father		
2019	Nerkonda Paarvai	Ramajayam		
2019	Magamuni	Jayaraman		
2021	Kabadadaari	Kumar / Rayudu		
2021	Vanakkam Da Mappilei	Natraj		
2021	Iruvar Ullam	Parvathy's father		
2021	Vinodhaya Sitham	Parasuram's MD		
2021	Jai Bhim	DGP Radhakrishnan		
2021	Raajavamsam	Sivanesan		
2021	Kasada Thapara	Judge	Streaming release	
2022	Veerapandiyapuram	Chelladurai		
2022	Etharkkum Thunindhavan	Thiraviya Pandian		
2022	Maaran	Kesavan		
2022	Manmadha Leelai	Mohan		
2022	The Warriorr	Robert		
2022	Gargi	Banuprakash		
2022	Diary	Gunasekharan		
2022	Lilly Rani	Michael's father		
2022	Pattathu Arasan	Thavamani		
2023	Rudhran	Police Inspector		
2023	Custody	Verghese		
2024	Captain Miller	King Rajadhipathi		
2024	Rathnam	Vedha Nayagam		
2024	Aranmanai 4	Varatha Rajan SV		
2024	Quotation Gang Part 1	Sivaraman		
2024	Meiyazhagan	Arivudai Nambi		
2024	Petta Rap	Bala's father		
2024	Miss You	Rajendran		
2025	2K Love Story			
2025	Robber			
2025	The Door	MD Velmurugan		
2025	Maaman	Rekha's father		
2025	Kuberaa	Narayan Gaikwad		
2026	My Lord	Judge Ramanujam		
2026	Kadhal Reset Repeat	Aditi's father		
2026	Charukesi	Neurologist Dr. Jacob Jebastin		
2026	Magudam	Pazham		
2026	All Pass			
2026	John Doe	Dr. Joseph Shaji Kurien		

=== Telugu films ===
List of Telugu film credits
Year	Title	Role	Notes	Ref.
2014	Karthikeya	Dr. Prakash		
2014	Run Raja Run	Prakash		
2016	Sarrainodu	Umapati "U. P."		
2016	Okka Ammayi Thappa			
2016	Rajadhi Raja	L. Padmanabhan		
2016	Babu Bangaram	Sastry		
2016	Nayaki	Gayatri's father		
2016	Nandini Nursing Home	Dr. Murthy		
2016	A Aa	Satyawada Krishnamoorthy		
2017	Luckunnodu	Bhakthavatsalam		
2017	Jaya Janaki Nayaka	JP		
2017	Spyder	Shiva's father		
2017	Meda Meeda Abbayi	Srinu's father		
2017	Jawaan	Jai's father		
2017	Okka Kshanam	Scientist		
2018	Agnyaathavaasi	Daya Bandaru		
2018	Touch Chesi Chudu	Karthikeya's father		
2018	Tej I Love You	Tej's Uncle		
2018	Vijetha	Company Chairman		
2018	Saakshyam	Siva Prasad		
2018	Chi La Sow	Anjali's uncle		
2018	Hello Guru Prema Kosame	Sanju's father		
2019	Vinaya Vidheya Rama	Governor of AP		
2019	Mr. Majnu	Krishna Prasad		
2019	Chitralahari	Company CEO		
2019	Jersey	BCCI Chairman		
2019	Voter	Siva		
2019	Kalki	Kabir Khan		
2019	Nivaasi	Suryanarayana Varma		
2019	Chanakya	Home Minister		
2020	Aswathama	Gana's father		
2020	World Famous Lover	Murthy		
2020	V	Jayaraj		
2020	Maa Vintha Gaadha Vinuma	Vinitha's father		
2021	Kapatadhaari	Kumar / Rayudu		
2021	Sashi	Dhora		
2021	Tuck Jagadish	Raghuram Patrudu		
2021	Republic	Prakash Rao		
2021	Most Eligible Bachelor	Harsha's father		
2021	Varudu Kaavalenu	Mr Bhupathi		
2022	The Warriorr	Robert		
2022	Krishna Vrinda Vihari	Krishna’s father		
2022	The Ghost	Colonel Nagendra Naidu		
2022	Macherla Niyojakavargam	Chief Minister		
2022	Sivudu		Only dubbed version released	
2023	Waltair Veerayya	High court Judge		
2023	Amigos	Jayendra		
2023	Ravanasura	Radhakrishna Chennuri		
2023	Custody	Verghese		
2023	Katha Venuka Katha	Krishna		
2023	Nene Naa	Nalgonda DSP		
2023	The Great Indian Suicide			
2023	My Name Is Shruthi	DGP		
2023	Aadikeshava	Balu's adoptive father		
2024	Saindhav	Murthy		
2024	Ooru Peru Bhairavakona	Murali		
2024	Harom Hara	Shiva Reddy		
2024	Fear			
2025	28 Degree Celsius	Dr. Subrahmanyam		
2025	Kuberaa	Narayan Gaikwad		
2026	Ustaad Bhagat Singh	Shloka’s father		

=== Malayalam films ===
List of Malayalam film credits
Year	Title	Role	Ref.
2010	Vandae Maatharam	Dr. Nayem	
2012	Thiruvambadi Thamban	Kishore	
2012	Ustad Hotel	Narayanan Krishnan	
2013	120 Minutes	Vishwanath	
2013	Red Wine	Dr. Paul Alexander	
2013	Pattam Pole	Ramanathan	
2016	Oozham	Wilfred Marcus	
2019	Mikhael	William	
2019	Pattabhiraman	K.R.K.	
2020	Shylock	Doctor	
2023	Jailer	Velu Thampi	
2023	Otta		

=== Kannada films ===
List of Kannada film credits
Year	Title	Role	Ref.
2012	Challenge	Vishwanath	
2019	Kavacha	Krishna Murthy	
2022	Trivikrama	Trisha's father	

=== Web series ===
List of web series credits
Year	Title	Role	Language	Platform	Ref.
2020	Addham	Lorry Driver	Telugu	Aha	
2021	11th Hour	Jagannath Reddy	Telugu	Aha	
2022	Hello World	Anand	Telugu	Zee5	
2023	The Village	GSK	Tamil	Prime Video	
2024	Brinda	SI Raghu	Telugu	SonyLIV	
2026	Warrant: From the World of Vilangu	Head of Commission	Tamil	ZEE5	

=== As producer ===
List of film producer credits
Year	Title	Language	Ref.
1996	Gopala Gopala	Tamil	
1997	Porkkaalam	Tamil	
2001	Thavasi	Tamil	
2002	April Maadhathil	Tamil	
2003	Julie Ganapathi	Tamil	
2004	Varnajalam	Tamil	
2004	Chellamae	Tamil	
2004	Neranja Manasu	Tamil	

=== Dubbing artist ===
List of film dubbing credits
Year	Title	Actor	Language	Notes	Ref.
2018	2.0	Akshay Kumar	Tamil		
2018	Kanaa	Kali Prasad Mukherjee	Tamil		
2023	Annapoorani: The Goddess of Food	Achyuth Kumar	Tamil		
2025	Game Changer	Rajeev Kanakala	Tamil	dubbed version	
