= Kerala Nattilam Pengaludane =

2014 Indian film by S. S. Kumaran

- Theatrical release poster
- Directed by: S. S. Kumaran
- Written by: S. S. Kumaran; N. Ramana Gopinath (dialogues)
- Produced by: Anusha Devi
- Starring: Abi; Gayathri; Deekshitha; Abhirami
- Cinematography: Bhuva
- Music by: S. S. Kumaran
- Production company: Suma Pictures
- Release date: 21 March 2014
- Running time: 103 minutes
- Country: India
- Language: Tamil

Kerala Nattilam Pengaludane (transl. With women of Kerala) is a 2014 Indian Tamil-language romantic comedy film directed by S. S. Kumaran and produced by his wife Anusha Devi. The film stars debutantes Abi Saravanan, Gayathri, Deekshitha, and Abhirami. The music was composed by the director himself, and the film was released on 21 March 2014.

== Plot ==
Thamizh Mani wants his son, Unnikrishnan, to marry a girl from Kerala as he believes that they are beautiful. Thamizh Mani was unable to marry the girl of his dreams, who was from Kerala, and acts as if he is a Malayali by celebrating Onam. His dream is for Unnikrishnan to marry a Malayali, and as a result, he sends him to Kerala.

== Cast ==
- Abi as Unnikrishnan
- Gayathri Mayura as Nisha
- Deekshitha as Meenkodi
- Abhirami as Manju
- Gnanasambandam as Thamizh Mani
- Renuka as Unnikrishnan's mother
- Kaali Venkat as Kesavan
- Abid as Ameen
- Kalyanamalai Mohan in a guest appearance

== Production ==
Abi Saravanan met the producer and the director after he finished studying engineering. He auditioned and landed in the hero's role. This film is S. S. Kumaran's second directorial venture after Theneer Viduthi (2011). The film is produced by Kumaran's wife, Anusha Devi, under her banner Suma Pictures. This is her second production after Theneer Viduthi. Amrutha Suresh's sister, Abhirami Suresh, acted in this film after finishing a diploma in acting. She plays a Malayali girl in the film who aspires to become Miss Kerala. She plays one of the three heroines paired opposite Abi Saravanan. She received the role after she went to AVM Studio to record a song and went Kumaran who was looking for a debutante. The other two actresses are Gayathri and Deekshitha. All three heroines are from Kerala.

== Soundtrack ==
The music was composed by S. S. Kumaran and the lyrics were written by Vairamuthu. Vairamuthu released the audio and the first copies of the soundtrack were received by G. V. Prakash Kumar, James Vasanthan, and Rajiv Menon.

Song title	Singer(s)
"Kerala Poloru"	Jassie Gift, S.S. Kumaran, Kalyani Menon
"Hello Yaradhu"	Mohit Chauhan
"Hello Yaradhu" (Reprise)	Vijay Prakash
"Kollai Azhage"	Vijay Prakash, Roopkumar Rathod
"Aangalai Nambathe"	Javed Ali

== Reception ==
A critic from The Times of India wrote that "Although the film has just a wafer-thin plot and logic takes a severe beating at quite a few places, Kumaran's victory lies in the fact that the film doesn't leave you bored, annoyed or frustrated at any given point". Malini Mannath of The New Indian Express opined that "Kerala Nattilam... at most times makes it seem like a TV serial". A critic from Maalaimalar called the film "beautiful".
