= Suno (disambiguation) =

Suno is a generative artificial intelligence music creation tool.

Suno may also refer to:

== People ==
- Ron Suno, US drill rapper, songwriter, comedian and youtuber
- Sarina Suno, Japanese violinist

== Places ==
- Suno, Piedmont, Italy

== Fictional characters ==
- Chase Suno from Monsuno
- Suno from Dragon Ball

== Other ==
- Radio Suno 91.7, Malayalam language radio station in Qatar
- Southern University at New Orleans
