= Aagam (film) =

2016 Indian film by Vijay Anand Sriram

- Film poster
- Directed by: V. Vijay Anand Sriram
- Written by: V. Vijay Anand Sriram
- Produced by: M. Koteeshwara Raju; M. Hema Raju
- Starring: Irfan; Deekshitha
- Cinematography: R V Charan
- Edited by: R Manoj Gyan
- Music by: Vishal Chandrasekhar
- Production company: JYO Star Enterprises
- Release date: 18 March 2016
- Country: India
- Language: Tamil

Aagam (transl. The arrival) is a 2016 Tamil-language film directed by debutante V. Vijay Anand Sriram and starring Irfan and Deekshitha. It was dubbed in Hindi as Corporate Criminal.

== Cast ==
- Irfan as Sai
- Deekshitha as Janani
- Riyaz Khan as Akilesh Acharya
- Jayaprakash as Dr. Sriram
- Y. Gee. Mahendra as Acharya
- Balaji K. Mohan as Partha - Narrator
- Sriranjani as Sai and Partha's mother
- Jeeva Ravi as Sai and Partha's father
- Arjunan as Sai's friend
- Prem as Mrithula
- TSR Srinivasan
- Aliona Munteanu as Aliona Munteanu
- Vijay Anand Sriram (cameo appearance)

== Production ==
The film is directed by Sriram who worked as an assistant director on Thani Oruvan (2015). Irfan was signed to play an MBA student who exposes a money scam. Deekshitha was signed as the heroine with Riyaz Khan as the antagonist. Jayaprakash and French actress Aliona Munteanu was roped in to play an important role.

== Soundtrack ==
Soundtrack was composed by Vishal Chandrasekhar.

- "Muttalae" - Anthony Daasan, Senthildass Velayutham
- "Tholaindaen" - Jagadeesh
- "Fly By" - Shilpa Natarajan
- "Aagam" - Mickey, JC

== Release ==
The Deccan Chronicle gave the film two out of five stars and wrote that " One gets a documentary feel at times, which takes away sheen". The Times of India gave the film one-and-a-half out of five stars and wrote that "We only wish that everything about this film wasn’t so confusing – starting with the story line, the back stories, the mind-boggling amount of actual ‘science’ in the film, brain mapping".
