= Abid Anwar =

Abid Anwar may refer to:

- Abid Anwar (poet)
- Abid Anwar (actor)
