= Deekshitha Manikkam =

Indian actress

- Born: Chennai, India
- Occupation: Actress
- Years active: 2014–2017

Deekshitha Manikkam is an Indian actress who has appeared in Tamil language films. After making her debut in the Tamil film Kerala Nattilam Pengaludane (2014), she has been in films including Thirumanam Enum Nikkah (2014) and Aagam (2016).

== Career ==
Born in Chennai, Deekshitha Manikkam completed a computer science engineering degree at SRM University before going on to participate as a finalist with Miss South India and also featured in the web series Happy To Be Single. She made her first on screen appearance by portraying one of the lead characters in the romantic comedy Kerala Nattilam Pengaludane (2014), before portraying a friend of Nazriya's character in Aascar Films' Thirumanam Enum Nikkah (2014). Deekshitha later appeared in the leading female role in Aagam and then in Nagarvalam.

In September 2017, she married music composer Dharan Kumar.

== Filmography ==
Year	Film	Role	Notes
2014	Kerala Nattilam Pengaludane	Meenkodi	
2014	Thirumanam Enum Nikkah	Ayesha	
2016	Aagam	Janani	
2017	Nagarvalam	Janani	
