= Abhirami Suresh =

Indian actress and singer

- Born: Kochi, Kerala, India
- Other name: Ebbie
- Occupations: Actress; singer; musician; composer; video jockey; model
- Years active: 2008 – present
- Relatives: Amritha Suresh (sister)
- Musical career
- Genres: Pop; Folk; Rocksa; Bhajan
- Instruments: Vocals; Keyboard; Violin
- Label: Independent artist
- Website: amrutamgamay.com

Abhirami Suresh is an Indian actress, singer, musician, composer, and video jockey. Abhirami and her sister Amritha Suresh are the lead vocalists of their music band Amrutam Gamaya. They are also known for vlogging.

== Early and personal life ==
She was born to P. R. Suresh and Laila. She has an elder sister, singer-composer Amrutha Suresh. She used to perform mimicry and monoact in her schools and "never missed out on a chance to be on the stage". In an interview, Abhirami said she always wanted to be an actress and although she is from a family of musicians she never saw herself as a singer or thought of pursuing music until Amrutam Gamay was formed. After completing class eleven, she did a diploma in acting. She has directed a short film as part of her undergraduate course. She runs a jewelry brand, Aamindo. Abhirami is also into modelling. She has walked the ramp in Kerala Fashion Runway 2018. She was also featured on the cover page of Vanitha Magazine along with her sister.She has featured in magazines including Kanyaka and Manorama Arogyam.

== Career ==
=== Film and television ===
Abhirami got her first acting offer after her impressions of host Ranjini Haridas and judge Sharreth on the music reality television show Idea Star Singer (2007) on Asianet in which her sister Amrutha Suresh was participating. This led to an offer to act in the children's television serial Hello Kuttichathan (2008 – 2009) on Asianet. She was 12 years old then and played the role of Nimmi. The show was well received by the audience. It was followed by roles in films such as Keralotsavam 2009 and Gulumaal: The Escape (both in 2009).

She made her Tamil acting debut with Kerala Nattilam Pengaludane (2014), a Malayalam-Tamil bilingual comedy in which she played a Malayali Muslim girl named Nisha who aspires to become Miss Kerala. She got the offer when she was in AVM Studios with Amrutha for recording a song, where director S. S. Kumaran met them who was looking for a newcomer for his film. Her first character as a female lead was in Beware of Dogs (2014). It was a comedy-drama and she played Meera in the film. It was followed by the romantic drama 100 Days of Love (2015) in which she played a supporting role as Pia George, the ex-girlfriend of Balan (Dulquer Salmaan). She played the female lead role in her second Tamil film, Kubera Rasi (2015), which revolves around a bank robbery.

In December 2018, Abhirami and Amrutha started a YouTube channel, Amrutam Gamay – AG, with the series AG Vlogs to publish their creative content. The content is related to their personal lives, travel, food, music, shopping among other things. In 2019, she acted in the teenage short film Viral. In 2020, Abhirami and Amrutha was invited to take part in the second season of Malayalam reality television game show Bigg Boss as contestants, however, they refused the offer because of other commitments. Later, they entered the Bigg Boss (Malayalam season 2) house as wildcard entrants on day 50.

=== Music ===
Abhirami began composing at a young age, her debut composition came out when she was 14 years old. She is a keyboardist and plays the violin. She has composed several bhajans in her early stint. The music band Amrutam Gamay was launched in 2014 in which her sister Amrutha and herself are the lead vocalists. The band performed internationally at gigs within six months of its formation. Abhirami was initially not part of the band which was founded by her sister Amrutha, but Amrutha invited her after hearing her rendition of a song they were preparing to perform on their debut on Kappa TV. Their cover version of Israeli folk song "Hava Nagila" sung by Amrutha was popular among the global Jewish community. In 2015, Abhirami and Amrutha wrote and composed multiple original songs for their band, including "Katturumbu", "Ayyayo", and "Harps of Peace". In the same year, Abhirami began hosting (as VJ) the daily music show Dear Kappa on Kappa TV.

Abhirami and Amrutha composed and sang a single for the film Crossroad (2017); it was the title song of the film and was composed in a short notice. It was followed by a single in the film Aadu 2 (2017), titled "Aadu 2 – Success Song". Abhirami independently composed the soundtrack of the film Sullu (2019).

== Filmography ==
=== Television ===
Year	Program	Role	Network	Notes
2007	Idea Star Singer	Herself	Asianet	
2007 – 2008	Hello Kuttichathan	Nimmy	Asianet	Malayalam TV Serial
2014	Valentine's Corner	Co-host	We TV	
2014 – 2017	Music Mojo (Season 3 and 4)	Singer	Kappa TV	Representing band Amrutam Gamay, along with Amrutha Suresh
2015	Star Jam	Guest	Kappa TV	Along with Amrutha Suresh
2015	Vartha Prabhatham	Guest	Asianet News	Talk show; along with Amrutha Suresh
2015	JB Junction	Guest	Kairali TV	Along with Amrutha Suresh
2015 – 2018	Dear Kappa	Host	Kappa TV	
2016	D3 – D4 Dance	Guest	Mazhavil Manorama	Along with Amrutha Suresh
2016	Moodtapes	Singer	Kappa TV	
2016	IFFK Kerala Talkies	Herself	Manorama Online	
2016	Smart Show	Participant	Flowers	Along with Amrutha Suresh; Opposite Stephen Devassy & Merin Gregory
2017	Varthakkappuram	Guest	Asianet News	Along with Amrutha Suresh
2017	Amruthamgamaya	Guest	News18 Kerala	Along with Amrutha Suresh
2017	Miss & Mrs Kerala Beauty Pageant 2017	Performer	Kairali TV	Alongside Amruthamgamaya band
2019	Paadaam Namukku Padaam	Guest	Mazhavil Manorama	Along with Amrutha Suresh
2019	Tharangalude Onam	Guest	Surya TV	
2019	Mazhavil Music Awards	Guest	Mazhavil Manorama	Award ceremony
2020	Bigg Boss (Malayalam season 2)	Herself	Asianet	Reality TV competition; paired with Amrutha Suresh
2020	Stay Home Stay Happy	Herself	Mathrubhumi News	Talk show
2020	Veendum Chila Veettu Visheshangal	Herself	Asianet	Chat show
2021	10th South Indian International Movie Awards	Red Carpet Host	Surya TV	Award show
2021	Bhima Jewellers	Model	Multi	Endorsement
2022	Flowers Oru Kodi	Participant	Flowers TV	Game show

=== Films ===
Year	Title	Role	Language	Notes
2009	Keralotsavam 2009	Sandeep Subramaniam's sister	Malayalam	
2009	Venalmaram		Malayalam	
2009	Gulumaal: The Escape	Ravi Varma's sister	Malayalam	
2014	Beware of Dogs	Meera	Malayalam	
2014	Kerala Nattilam Pengaludane	Manju	Tamil	
2015	100 Days of Love	Pia George	Malayalam	
2015	Kubera Rasi	Anitha	Tamil	
2017	Crossroad	Herself	Malayalam	Title song performer
TBA	Kelvi	College student	Tamil; Malayalam	Delayed
2019	Viral	Radhika	Malayalam	Short film

== Discography ==
Year	Film	Song	Credit
2017	Crossroad	"Veerangana"	Composer; Singer
2018	Aadu 2	"Aadu 2 – Success Song"	Composer; Singer
2019	Sullu	"Mariville" "Mariville – Male Version" "Mariville – Humming Version"	Composer; Singer

== Online appearances ==
Year	Title	Role	Network	Notes
Sensations Entertainment	Guest	Online	Talk show	
2017	IndiaGlitz Malayalam Movies Interview	Guest	IndiaGlitz Online	Chat show
2018 - Present	Amrutam Gamay - AG	Herself/host	Online	YouTube Channel
2019	Movie Man	Herself	Online	Talk show
2019	Vanita Utsav	Performer	Youtube	Stage show
2019	Red FM Red Carpet	Herself	Red FM Malayalam Online	Talk show
2019	Candid Chat with Mammootty	Interviewer	Sillymonks Online	Talk show
2019	Oppo Kerala 4th Anniversary	Performer	Youtube	Stage show
2019	Ice Break with Veena	Herself	Behindwoods Ice Online	Chat show
2020	Blindfold Games	Herself	Movie Man Broadcasting	Blind Test
2020	Stops Here	Herself	Movie Man Broadcasting	Chat show
2020	Tête-à-Tête w Toot	Host	YouTube	
2022	Behindwoods Ice	Guest	YouTube	
2022	Popper Stop Malayalam	Guest	YouTube	
2022	Asiaville Theatre Malayalam	Guest	YouTube	
2022	Indian Cinema Gallery	Guest	YouTube	
2022	Mirchi Malayalam	Guest	YouTube	
