= DJ Savyo =

Indian DJ and record producer

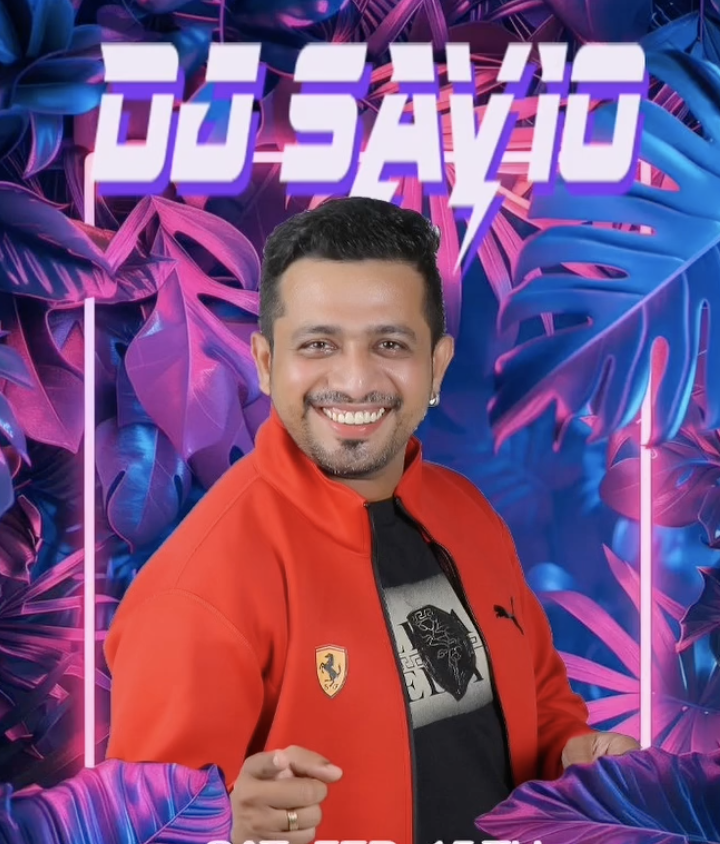
- Picture of DJ Savyo
- Born: Savio Joseph Mendez; Cochin, India
- Occupation(s): DJ, Record Producer
- Years active: 1998–present

DJ Savyo (born Savio Joseph Mendez) is an Indian DJ and record producer.

== Tracks ==
Track	Notes
Jo Tere Sang	Blood Money Movie
Kukkad	Student of the year movie
Destiny	Feat Amrita Suresh
Kaantha Pooram	Ft Neeraj Gopal
Jimikki Kammal	Velipadinte Pusthakam
Omanathikal	Featuring Siddarth Menon
Free Formation	Liguid Percussion
Manikya Malaraya Poove	Oru Adaar Love Movie
