= Ashika Ranganath =

Indian actress (born 1996)

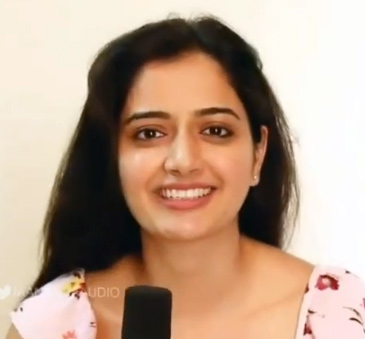
- Ashika in 2020
- Born: 5 August 1996 (age 30); Tumkur, Karnataka, India
- Occupation: Actress
- Years active: 2016–present

Ashika Ranganath (born 5 August 1996) is an Indian actress who works in Kannada, Telugu and Tamil films. She made her acting debut with the Kannada film Crazy Boy (2016). Ashika received the SIIMA Award for Best Actress – Kannada for her performance in Madhagaja (2021) and O2 (2024) and Best Actress Critics – Kannada Gatha Vaibhava (2025).

== Early life ==
Ashika Ranganath was born on 5 August 1996 to a Kannada speaking couple Ranganath and Sudha Ranganath in Tumkur district. She has an elder sister Anusha Ranganath, who is also an actress in Kannada movies. She studied in Bishop Sargant School, Tumkur. Later, she moved to Bengaluru for pre-university and joined Jyoti Nivas College, where she auditioned for a Clean and Clear Fresh Face Bangalore contest, emerging as the runner-up of Miss Fresh Face 2014. She then completed her degree in commerce from MES College of Arts, Commerce and Science. In addition to acting, she is also trained in various dance forms including freestyle, Belly and western.

== Career ==
Ashika Ranganath started her acting career with Crazy Boy in 2016, directed by Mahesh Babu, who picked her during a Clean and Clear Fresh Face Bangalore contest. She was nominated for SIIMA Award for Best Female Debut – Kannada. In 2017, she appeared in Mass Leader alongside Shivrajkumar, Mugulu Nage opposite Ganesh, which were commercially successful. In 2018, she appeared in Raju Kannada Medium, Thayige Thakka Maga (2018 film) and Raambo 2. In Raambo 2, she played the lead opposite Sharan and received her first SIIMA Award for Best Actress – Kannada. The film was a box office success.

After a small hiatus, Ashika Ranganath appeared in the song "Pataki Poriyo" in Kotigobba 3 with Sudeepa. Later, she appeared in Madhagaja opposite Sriimurali, which won her the SIIMA Award for Best Actress – Kannada. It was a box office success and A Shraddha of The New Indian Express noted, "Ashika has a different role to play and she brings elegance to the film as a rural belle."

Ashika had five film released in 2022. She first appeared in the titular song of James. She then appeared in Avatara Purusha, Ranganath with Sharan, in Garuda and in Kaaneyaadavara Bagge Prakatane. She then played the lead opposite Ishaan in Raymo, an average grosser. Sridevi S stated, "Ashika has pulled off her dual-shade role easily. She looks very pretty and convincing." She received her third SIIMA Award for Best Actress – Kannada nomination. She then made her Tamil film debut opposite Atharvaa in Pattathu Arasan.

In 2023, Ashika Ranganath made her Telugu film debut opposite Nandamuri Kalyan Ram in Amigos. In 2024, she appeared opposite Nagarjuna in Naa Saami Ranga which was moderate success. Neeshitha Nyayapati called her the "screen stealer". Ashika then appeared in two Kannada films - Avatara Purusha 2 and O2. Vivek MV of The Hindu noted, "Ashika is a revelation, unveiling the talented performer in her."

Ashika will next appear in Gatha Vaibhava directed by Simple Suni, in Miss You alongside Siddarth, and in Vishwambhara, with Chiranjeevi.

== Media image ==
In the Bangalore Times Most Desirable Women list, Ashika was placed 11th in 2017, 2nd in 2018 and 2019, and 4th in 2020. She is one of the most followed Kannada actress on Instagram.

== Filmography ==
Key
†	Denotes films that have not yet been released

=== Films ===
Year	Title	Role	Language	Notes	Ref.
2016	Crazy Boy	Nandini	Kannada		
2017	Mass Leader	Shreya	Kannada		
2017	Mugulu Nage	Vaishali Hande	Kannada		
2018	Raju Kannada Medium	Vidya	Kannada		
2018	Raambo 2	Mayuri	Kannada		
2018	Thayige Thakka Maga	Saraswathi	Kannada		
2021	Kotigobba 3	Chameli	Kannada	Special appearance in song "Pataki Poriyo"	
2021	Madhagaja	Pallavi	Kannada		
2022	James	Herself	Kannada	Special appearance in song "Trademark"	
2022	Avatara Purusha	Siri	Kannada		
2022	Garuda	Pooja	Kannada		
2022	Kaaneyaadavara Bagge Prakatane	Rashmika	Kannada	Cameo appearance	
2022	Raymo	Mohana	Kannada		
2022	Pattathu Arasan	Pavithra	Tamil		
2023	Amigos	Ishika	Telugu		
2024	Naa Saami Ranga	Varamahalakshmi "Varalu"	Telugu		
2024	Avatara Purusha 2	Siri	Kannada		
2024	O2	Dr. Shraddha	Kannada		
2024	Miss You	Subbulakshmi Ramakrishnan	Tamil		
2025	Gatha Vaibhava	Adhunika, Devakanye Devi (Devathe), Elizabeth and Mangala (Thulasi)	Kannada	Quadruple role	
2026	Bhartha Mahasayulaku Wignyapthi	Manasa Shetty	Telugu		
2026	Sardar 2	Faiza	Tamil		
2026	Vishwambhara †	TBA	Telugu	Post-production	

=== Music video ===
Year	Title	Singer	Ref.
2022	"Mallige Hoova"	All Ok	

== Awards and nominations ==
Year	Award	Category	Work	Result	Ref.
2017	South Indian International Movie Awards	Best Female Debut – Kannada	Crazy Boy	Nominated	
2019	South Indian International Movie Awards	Best Actress – Kannada	Raambo 2	Nominated	
2022	South Indian International Movie Awards	Best Actress – Kannada	Madhagaja	Won	
2023	South Indian International Movie Awards	Best Actress – Kannada	Raymo	Nominated	
2025	South Indian International Movie Awards	Best Actress – Kannada	O2	Won	
2025	South Indian International Movie Awards	Best Actress – Telugu	Naa Saami Ranga	Nominated	
