= Nagarvalam =

2017 Indian film by Markx

- Poster
- Directed by: Markx
- Written by: Markx
- Produced by: M. Natarajan; N. Ramesh
- Starring: Yuthan Balaji; Deekshitha Manikkam
- Cinematography: R. Tamizh Thendral
- Edited by: J. V. Manikanda Balaji
- Music by: Pawan Karthick
- Production company: Redcarpet Production
- Release date: April 21, 2017
- Running time: 129 minutes
- Country: India
- Language: Tamil

Nagarvalam (transl. Around the city) is a 2017 Indian Tamil-language drama film written and directed by Markx. The film stars Yuthan Balaji and Deekshitha Manikkam, while Yogi Babu, Bala Saravanan, and Namo Narayana play supporting roles. The film had a theatrical release on 21 April 2017.

== Plot ==
Nagarvalam is the love story between two youngsters and an unexpected murder that shattered their dreams.

== Cast ==
- Yuthan Balaji as Kumar
- Deekshitha Manikkam as Janani
- Bala Saravanan as Kumar's friend
- Yogi Babu as Tamil Teacher
- Vettai Muthukumar as Janani's brother
- G. Marimuthu as Janani's father
- Namo Narayana
- Anjathe Sridhar
- T. Ravi
- Attakathi Velu
- Jayakumar
- Rindhu Ravi
- Sharmila
- Pasupathy in a guest appearance in the song "Isthukunu Irukuthu"

== Soundtrack ==
Soundtrack was composed by Pavan Karthik.

- "Kannala Kallu" - Yogisekar, Saaviyaa
- "Isthukunu" - Deva, Chinna Ponnu
- "Dinusaa Thaan" - Rocky, Saaviyaa
- "Anthangura" - Yogisekar, Saaviyaa
- "Paathu Poda" - Yogisekar, Gana Vinoth

== Release ==
The film opened on 21 April 2017 to mixed reviews from critics. The Hindu wrote "The film is mildly reminiscent of Balaji Sakthivel's Kaadhal (2004) that handled similar themes with more finesse and vision. Nagarvalam, though, ends up being such an over-long bus journey — you would rather hop off the bus and take an autorickshaw than sit through all its stops." The Times of India wrote "The film needed more such tense moments than ones like the forced drama that we get at the interval point."
