= Loganathan Srinivasan =

Indian cinematographer

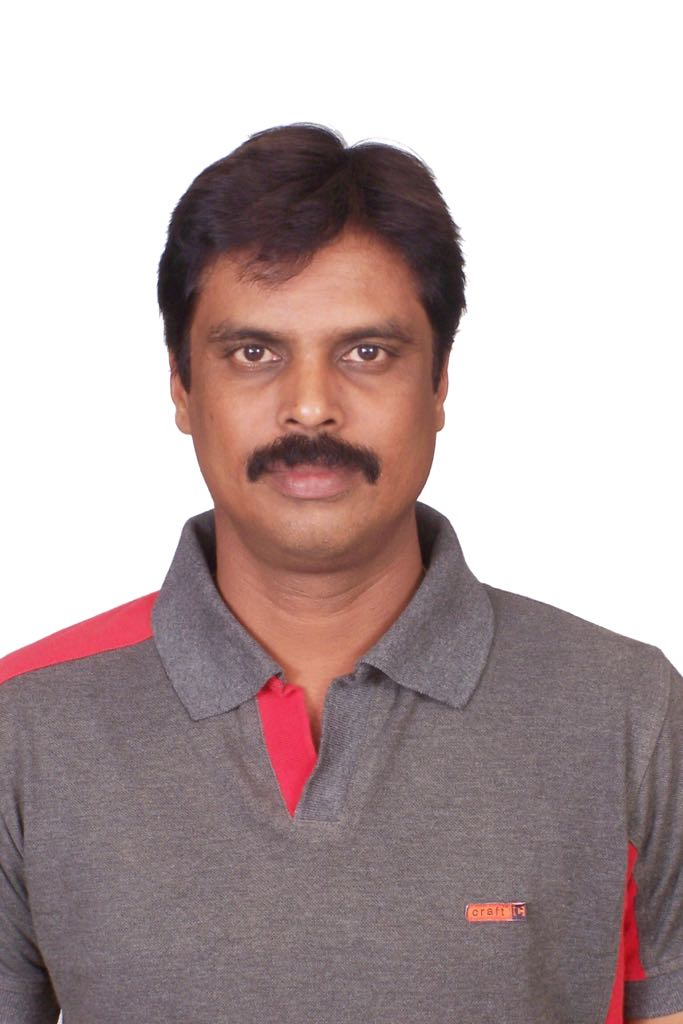
- Loganathan Srinivasan
- Born: Chennai, Tamil Nadu, India
- Other names: Loknath, S. Loganathan, S. Lokanathan, Lokanathan, Lokanath
- Occupation: Cinematographer

Loganathan Srinivasan is an Indian cinematographer who predominantly works in Malayalam, Telugu, Tamil and Kannada film industries. He is known for his cinematography in the critically and commercially successful film Ustad Hotel.

== Career ==
Beginning his career in Telugu films, Loganathan shot for two films featuring Allari Naresh, before moving to work more in the Malayalam film industry. He shot for films including Moonnamathoral (2006), Annan Thambi (2008) and Major Ravi's war film, Kurukshetra (2008), before winning acclaim for his work in Ustad Hotel (2012).

He has notable works in the Tamil film industry with Yash Raj Films' Aaha Kalyanam (2014), after which he shot for Thirumanam Ennum Nikkah (2014) and Vaaliba Raja (2015).

== Filmography ==
=== As cinematographer ===
Year	Film	Language	Director
2002	Allari	Telugu	Ravi Babu
2003	Thotti Gang	Telugu	E. V. V. Satyanarayana
2005	Soggadu	Telugu	Ravi Babu
2006	Moonnamathoral	Malayalam	V. K. Prakash
2007	Pranayakalam	Malayalam	Uday Ananthan
2007	Janmam	Malayalam	Joshiy
2008	Annan Thambi	Malayalam	Anwar Rasheed
2008	Kurukshetra	Malayalam	Major Ravi
2009	Bhagavan	Malayalam	Prashanth Mambully
2010	Aidondla Aidu	Kannada	V. K. Prakash
2011	Aha Naa Pellanta	Telugu	Veerabhadram Chowdary
2012	Spanish Masala	Malayalam	Lal Jose
2012	Ustad Hotel	Malayalam	Anwar Rasheed
2014	Aaha Kalyanam	Telugu	A. Gokul Krishna
2014	Thirumanam Ennum Nikkah	Tamil	Anis
2015	Lailaa O Lailaa	Malayalam	Joshiy
2015	Rockstar	Malayalam	V. K. Prakash
2016	Vaaliba Raja	Tamil	Sai Gokul Ramanath
2016	Selfie Raja	Telugu	G. Nageswara Reddy
2017	Satra Ko Shaadi Hai	Hindi	Arshad Sayed
2017	Vishwaguru	Malayalam	Vijeesh Mani
2018	Parole	Malayalam	Sharrath Sandith
2019	Savarna Deergha Sandhi	Kannada	Veerendra Shetty
(TBA)	Namo †	Sanskrit	Vijeesh Mani
2021	Puzhayamma	Malayalam	Vijeesh Mani
2021	Erida	Malayalam, Tamil	V. K. Prakash
2022	Pattathu Arasan	Tamil	A. Sarkunam
2022	Naalam Mura	Malayalam	Deepu Anthikkad
2023	Maharani	Malayalam	G. Marthandan
TBA	I.C.U	Malayalam	George Varghese
