= Amrutha Suresh =

Indian singer (born 1990)

- Amrutha in 2026
- Born: 2 August 1990 (age 36); Kochi, Kerala, India
- Other name: Ammu
- Occupations: Singer; composer; radio jockey; model
- Years active: 2007 – present
- Spouse: Bala (m. 2010; div. 2019)
- Children: 1
- Relatives: Abhirami Suresh (sister)
- Musical career
- Genres: Pop; classical; folk; Ghazal; Bhajan; rock
- Instrument: Vocals
- Label: Independent artist
- Website: amrutamgamay.com

Amrutha Suresh (born 2 August 1990) is an Indian singer, composer, songwriter, and radio jockey. She attained popularity after her stint at the reality television singing competition Idea Star Singer on Asianet in 2007. Since then, she has sung and composed for several films and music albums. She has been a celebrity radio jockey on Radio Suno 91.7 with the music show Suno Melodies. In 2014, she founded the music band Amrutam Gamay

== Early life ==
Amrutha was born in Kochi, Kerala, to musician P. R. Suresh and Laila. Her mother, who was born as a Roman Catholic, converted to Hinduism upon her marriage. She has a sister, singer and composer Abhirami Suresh, who is five years younger. They are from Edappally, Kochi.

Living in a family (paternal) of musicians inspired her to pursue music from a young age. Amrutha started singing at age three; Celine Dion and Michael Jackson are the singers who influenced her to become a singer.

Amrutha was a topper at school. Even though, she dropped 12th standard for contesting in the reality television singing competition Idea Star Singer, later she completed the course in private. She then took graduation in Bachelor of Business Administration (BBA) and post-graduation in Master of Business Administration (MBA), and also holds degrees in Carnatic music and Hindustani classical music.

== Career ==
=== Music ===
She comes from a musician's family, she used to perform at stage shows during her childhood. While studying in eighth standard, she has been a child singer in Nadirshah's stage shows. In 2007, Amrutha contested in the second season of reality television singing competition Idea Star Singer on Asianet, she was one of the popular contestants on the show. It helped her foray into film industry. Since then, she has sung playback in a number of Malayalam films. Pulliman was her debut film as playback singer, composed by Sharreth. Her rendition of the song "Munthirpoo" from the film Aagathan (2010) was well received.

She sang "Kannu Karuthu" for music director Sharreth in his album Strawberry Theyyam (2014) which was a blend of folk and western orchestration, the song was particularly praised in the 9-track album. In 2014, Amritha founded the music band Amrutam Gamay. Amritha and her sister Abhirami Suresh are the lead vocalists of the band. The band performed internationally at gigs within six months of its formation. The band handles all kinds of genres, including Indian, western, folk, classical, or rock. The band's cover version of Israeli folk song "Hava Nagila" sung by Amritha was popular among the global Jewish community. The song gave her much appreciations. In 2015, Amritha and Abhirami wrote and composed multiple original songs for their band, including "Katturumbu", "Ayyayo", and "Harps of Peace".

In 2017, Amrutha released her first single, "Anayathe", which featured herself and was a tribute to motherhood and women. The song was positively received and garnered attention for its theme. After its release, Amritha got acting offers from some Tamil films, but she refused as she was not seeing herself as an actress at the time. She was also approached by a Canadian production company for an English film. In the same year, she began presenting the musical talk show Suno Melodies on Radio Suno 91.7 as a celebrity radio jockey. Amritha along with Abhirami composed, sang and acted in the title song of the film Crossroad that year. It was their debut composition in a film and was composed in a short notice. It was followed by a single in the film Aadu 2 (2017), titled "Aadu 2 – Success Song".

In 2019, she sang "Minni Minni" in the film June which was well received. For the song, she was nominated for the Mazhavil Music Award for Best Female Singer. In the same year, Amritha sang the first of the three music videos in DJ Savyo's Destiny, an experimental album which used Shiva mantra in the backdrop of electronic dance music. That year she also signed a project with Swedish musician Neil Luckz, who contacted her after watching her music video Ohm Nama Shivaya; she is working on six English songs for the project. In 2019, she sang a song in the children's film Sullu composed by Abhirami.

=== Other works ===
Amrutha is also into modelling. In 2017, she was featured in the cover of lifestyle magazine FWD Life. In the following year, she walked the ramp at Kerala Fashion Runway. She was also featured on the cover page of Vanitha Magazine along with her sister. In 2018, Amrutha started a hashtag campaign on Instagram known as Amazing Me, promoting self-esteem. It received positive response from public. In December 2018, Amrutha and her sister Abhirami started a YouTube channel, Amrutam Gamay – AG, with the series AG Vlogs to publish their creative content. The content is related to their personal lives, travel, food, music, shopping among other things. The series met with positive reception from viewers. In 2020, Amrutha and Abhirami entered as contestants in the second season of Malayalam reality television game show Bigg Boss (Malayalam season 2), hosted by actor Mohanlal on Asianet. They entered the Bigg Boss house as wildcard entrants on day-50 and plays as a pair.

== Personal life ==
Amrutha first met her ex-husband Bala at the sets of the film Venalmaram in which he was starring and Amrutha was playback singer. Later, they developed a friendship-turned-romance while she was contesting in the reality TV singing competition Idea Star Singer in which he was a celebrity judge. They talked to each other's family and got married on 27 August 2010 at a ceremony held in Chennai. They were residing in Palarivattom, Kochi. They are reported to have started living separately in 2015, and got legal divorce in December 2019. They have a daughter named Avanthika born in 2012 who lives with her.

== Discography ==
=== Playback singer ===
Year	Song	Film	Ref.
2007	"Unarumee Pulakangal"	Vaamanapuri	
2008	"Minnaaminunge"	Kabadi Kabadi	
2009	"Ayalathe Kuyile"	Venalmaram	
2010	"Munthiripoo"	Aagathan	
2010	"Sadukudu"	Pulliman	
2010	"Amma Nilaavaau"	Ammanilavu	
2012	"Akalaminnarikeyalle" "Kannaake"	The Hitlist	
2017	"Nirame Maayalle"	Vilakkumaram	
2017	"Veerangana"	Crossroad	
2019	"Minni Minni"	June	
2019	"Maariville"	Sullu	
2020	"Alhamdulillah"	Sufiyum Sujatayum	

=== TV Serial ===
Year	Title	Credits	Notes
2009	Makalude Amma	"Chandrika Penna"	Singer

=== Singles / Music videos ===
Year	Title	Credits	Notes
2017	"Anayathe"	Composer; Singer	
2017	"Veerangana"	Composer; Singer	Film: Crossroad; Also appears in the song
2018	"Aadu 2 – Success Song"	Composer; Singer	Film: Aadu 2
2020	"Naruthen onjalumaayithaa"		Spandanam
2021	"Maturma"		
2021	"Ayyo Vayyaye"		
2021	"Kannan Varugindra"		
2021	"Madhava Mamava"		
2021	"Paluke Bangaramayena"		
2021	"Omanathingalkidavo"		
2021	"Bhagyada Lakshmi"		
2021	"Rama Rama Nivaramu"		
2022	"Manasa Sancharare"		
2022	"Bho Shambo"		
2022	"Gopalaka Pahimam"		
2022	"Seethakalyana Vaibhogame"		
2022	"Enna Thavam Seithanai "		
2022	"Kuraiondrum Illai"		
2022	"Nagumomu"		
2022	"Thirathalam"		
2022	"Sundara Chanthamulla"		Thontharava

=== Albums ===
Year	Title	Album	Ref.
2006	"Neelaakaasam"	Adhishakthi	
2007	"Onnu Thottal Mathi" "Manasthapamode"	Karthavu	
2008	"Palolichandrikayil"	Sivapriya	
2008	"Pogallennu"	Kottiyoor Kaarunyam	
2008	"Chandana Chela Chutty" "Sankholiyunarum"	Jayadurga	
2008	"Kudamalooril"	Sreeyesunadan	
2008	"Hari Ohm Hari Ohm" "Palazhiyil Palli Kollum"	Midhila	
2008	"Thulli Thulli" "Varnamayilerum"	Vel Vel	
2009	"Kaalathu Kaanumbol" "Kumbha Maasathil" "Maadi Maadi Vilikkunnu" "Oru Njettilundaaya"	Sarva Mangale	
2009	"Thirumizhikal (F)"	Divyaarchana	
2009	"Lakshmana Sree Lakshmana" "Maanasam Manimandiram" "Raghupathi Raamam"	Sarayoo	
2009	"Chenthaarakam" "Kaali Kaali"	Sivanandini	
2009	"Chottanikkarayil" "Devi Devi Bhadre" "Sankeerthanam"	Bhagavathiseva	
2009	"Kudamalooril"	Vishudha Alphonsamma	
2009	"Ee Puzhathan"	Aleena Ninakkai	
2010	"Ethra Valarnnalum (F)" "Jeevanay"	Kazhcha	
2010	"Maanam Thelinju"	Ohm Kaali	
2010	"Anuthaapamodanayan – 1"	Dhivyakarunya Thanalil	
2011	"Karunyathin"	The King of Israel	
2011	"Ambalathin Nadathurannu" "Nallamme Nallathu" "Neela Churul Mudi"	Rudra Kaali	
2012	"Snehamanen – Female"	In the Name of Jesus	
2012	"Ninmahathwam"	Sugandhavahini Amma	
2012	"Kanna Ennunnikanna" "Kunungi Kunungi"	Kalkandam	
2012	"Anuthaapiyaay Njan"	Jeevan Nalkum Vachanam	
2013	"Mathavanen"	Daivaputhran	
2013	"Rukminiyo Sathyabhamayo"	Vrindhavanam	
2013	"Oro Thudippum – 1"	Happy Christmas	
2013	"Kunnolam"	Vaidyan	
2014	"Yesuve Nin" "Yesurajan"	Athyunnathangalil	
2014	"Kannu Karuthu (Duet)"	Strawberry Theyyam	
2015	"Mizhineerin Sagara"	Eeran Nilavil	
2015	"Yesuvellam (F)"	Divya Sparsham	
2015	"Kaattinte Chundil" "Ethrayo Bhaagyamaai"	Geethamritham	
2015	"Thirumizhikal (F)"	Divyaarchana	
2015	"Eshoy Aye Ekykakail"	Samrudhy	
2015	"Chettikulangara" "Sreevazhum"	Sarvam Jagadeeswari	
2018	"Meda Kinakkal"	Swarna Kaineettam	
2018	""	Avarkkai	
2019	"Davidhu Chiguruvu"	Santhvanam	
2019	""	Destiny	also actress
2019	""	Gokulapalakan	

== Filmography ==
List of television appearances
Year	Title	Role	Network	Notes
2007	Idea Star Singer	Herself	Asianet	Reality TV singing competition
2011	Manassiloru Mazhavillu	Guest	Kairali TV	Talk show
2012	Gazhal	Singer	DD Malayalam	
2012	Star Ragging	Guest	Kairali TV	Talk show
2012	Anubhavathal	Guest	Asianet News	Talk show
2012	Vanitha	Guest	Mazhavil Manorama	Talk show; episode 27
2014 – 2017	Music Mojo (Season 3 and 4)	Singer	Kappa TV	Representing band Amrutam Gamay, along with Abhirami Suresh
2015	Star Jam	Guest	Kappa TV	Talk show; along with Abhirami Suresh
2015	Vartha Prabhatham	Guest	Asianet News	Talk show; along with Abhirami Suresh
2015	Onnum Onnum Moonu	Guest	Mazhavil Manorama	Talk show; episode 20
2015	JB Junction	Guest	Kairali TV	Talk show; along with Abhirami Suresh
2016	D3 – D4 Dance	Guest	Mazhavil Manorama	Along with Abhirami Suresh
2016	Smart Show	Participant	Flowers	Along with Abhirami Suresh; Opposite Stephen Devassy & Merin Gregory
2016	Mylanchi Little Champions	Guest Singer	Asianet	
2017	Chat with Amrutha Suresh	Guest	Kaumudy TV	Talk show
2017	Varthakkappuram	Guest	Asianet News	Talk show
2017	Manikilukkam	Guest	Kairali TV	Musical show
2017	Music Shots	Singer	Manorama Online	
2017	Miss & Mrs Kerala Beauty Pageant 2017	Performer	Kairali TV	Alongside Amruthamgamaya band
2017	Moodtapes	Singer	Kappa TV	
2017	Amruthamgamaya	Guest	News18 Kerala	Along with Abhirami Suresh
2018	The Happiness Project	Guest	Kappa TV	Talk show
2019	Parayam Namukku Padaam	Guest	Mazhavil Manorama	Along with Abhirami Suresh
2019	Tharangalude Onam	Guest	Surya TV	
2019	Mazhavil Music Awards	Herself	Mazhavil Manorama	Award ceremony; nominated for "Minni Minni" in June
2019	Josh Talks	Herself	Josh Talks	Talk show
2020	Bigg Boss (Malayalam season 2)	Herself	Asianet	Reality TV competition; paired with Abhirami Suresh
2020	Stay Home Stay Happy	Herself	Mathrubhumi News	Talk show
2020	Veendum Chila Veettu Visheshangal	Herself	Asianet	Chat show
2020	Paadam Nedaam	Participant	Amrita TV	Game show
2021	10th South Indian International Movie Awards	Red Carpet Host	Surya TV	Award show
2021	Bhima Jewellers	Model	Multi	Endorsement
2024	Tunes and Tales	Host	Manorama Max	
2026– present	Top Singer 7	Judge	Flowers TV	

== Online appearances ==
Year	Title	Role	Network	Notes
2016	The Muse Room	Performer	Online	Musical show
2017	How Well Do You Know	Guest	FWD TV Online	Chat show
2017	IndiaGlitz Malayalam Movies Interview	Guest	IndiaGlitz Online	Chat show
2017	Sensations Entertainment	Guest	Online	Talk show
2018–present	Amrutam Gamay - AG	Herself/host	Online	YouTube Channel
2019	Movie Man	Herself	Online	Talk show
2019	Red FM Red Carpet	Herself	Red FM Malayalam Online	Talk show
2019	Candid Chat with Mammootty	Interviewer	Sillymonks Online	Talk show
2019	Oppo Kerala fourth Anniversary	Performer	YouTube	Stage show
2019	Vanita Utsav	Performer	YouTube	Stage show
2020	Iam the Answer	Herself	Vanitha Online	Talk show
2020	Choych Choych Powam	Herself	Ginger Media Broadcasting Online	Talk show
2020	Be It	Herself	Online	Talk show
2020	Talentine Hours with Asianet	Herself	Asianet Online	
2020	Dinner Talk	Host/Herself	Asianet Online	
2022	On Air with Meenakshi	Herself	Jango Space TV	
2022	What's in My Bag	Herself	Kaumudy Movies	
2022	Choych Choych Povam	Herself	Ginger Media Entertainments	

== Awards ==
- Creative Film Awards 2019 - for Best Singer Female - June
