= O2 (2024 film) =

2024 Indian Kannada medical thriller film

- Poster
- Directed by: Raghav Nayak; Prashanth Raj
- Written by: Raghav Nayak; Prashanth Raj
- Produced by: Ashwini Puneeth Rajkumar
- Starring: Ashika Ranganath; Praveen Tej
- Cinematography: Naveen Kumar S
- Edited by: Deepu S. Kumar
- Music by: Vivan Radhakrishna
- Production company: PRK Productions
- Distributed by: KRG Studios
- Release date: 19 April 2024
- Running time: 109 Minutes
- Country: India
- Language: Kannada

O2 (stylized as O_{2}) is a 2024 Indian Kannada language medical thriller film written and directed by the duo of Raghav Nayak and Prashanth Raj, and produced by Ashwini Puneeth Rajkumar under PRK Productions. The film stars Ashika Ranganath and Praveen Tej. The film has music composed by Vivan Radhakrishna and cinematography handled by Naveen Kumar S.

Principal photography commenced in October 2021 in Bengaluru. The film was released on 19 April 2024. It opened to generally positive reviews with praise for its theme of medical research and the production house's intent to bring in fresh talent and ideas.

== Synopsis ==
Dr. Shraddha Nayak, with the help of her colleagues, is working on O2 - a drug that can bring back the dead. Can she achieve a medical miracle?

== Cast ==
- Ashika Ranganath as Shraddha
  - Sharvari as Young Shraddha
- Praveen Tej as Dev
- Raaghav Naayak as Osho
- Prakash Belawadi as Dr. Mrutyunjay
- Shreedhar as Dr. Roy
- Gopalkrishna Deshpande as Nayak
- Puneeth B. A. as Venky
- Siri Ravikumar as Shrushti
- Mohan as Dr. JK
- Aruna Balraj
- K.J. Pavan
- Sharanya as Anna
- Suma Rao as Prosecutor

== Production ==
=== Development ===
In late 2020, It was reported that PRK Productions were to produce a film directed by debutants Raghav Nayak and Prashanth Raj, the film was said to be a thriller for which the directors had worked on the script for around 4 years. The film began officially by conducting a Pooja in the presence of late Puneeth Rajkumar on 8 October 2021.

=== Casting ===
Ashika Ranganath was cast as the leading actor of the film alongside Praveen Tej, Siri Ravikumar, Prakash Belawadi and others.

=== Filming ===
The film started its initial shoot after the muhurta held on 8 October 2021. However, the shooting was halted after the sudden demise of Puneeth Rajkumar on 29 October 2021. The team resumed shooting in January 2022 and was wrapped around September 2022.

== Soundtrack ==
O_{2}

Soundtrack album by Vivan Radhakrishna
- Released: 2024
- Recorded: 2023
- Genre: Feature film soundtrack
- Length: 6:35
- Language: Kannada
- Label: PRK Audio
- Producer: Vivan Radhakrishna

Vivan Radhakrishna chronology
Made in China (2022)	O_{2} (2024)

Vivan Radhakrishna has composed the sound track and the background music for the film. The film has two songs and one background score.

Track listing
No.	Title	Lyrics	Singer(s)	Length
1.	"Ninagaage"	Jayanth Kaikini	Sanjith Hegde	03:44
2.	"Nashey Nashey"	Vivan Radhakrishna, Raghav Nayak	Vishwanath Acharya, Vivan Radhakrishna, Aditya Naik, Raghav Nayak	02:51
Total length:				06:35

== Release ==
=== Theatrical ===
The release date of the film was announced along with the teaser of the film. The film was released across Karnataka on 19 April 2024 through KRG Studios.

== Reception ==
The film opened to generally positive reviews for its story, direction, and the actors' performances; however, its predictability and a few jarring sequences were criticized.

Sridevi S of The Times of India rated the film 3/5 stars and wrote "Despite shortcomings, O2 definitely comes with enough oxygen to keep the audience alive, and the film can be enjoyed in theatres with family." Vivek MV of The Hindu also opined similar and wrote "This medical drama gets the job done despite its flaws. A brilliant Ashika Ranganath anchors 'O2', a medical thriller that almost nails its futuristic idea with its simple yet efficient story. A Sharadhaa of The New Indian Express rated the film 3 out of 5 stars and in her review wrote "While O2 stands as a good attempt by the directorial duo to explore a unique blend of a medical thriller and romance with heartfelt storytelling, the straightforward narrative may make some aspects predictable." Shashiprasad SM of Times Now rated the film 3 out of 5 and wrote "Barring the excessive usage of English and some dull moments, the film mainly deserves appreciation for its experimental attempt to deliver fresh content to the Kannada silver screen." Pranati AS of Deccan Herald described the film as an "Interesting plot on medical research" but criticized the misogyny in the film's characters.

Vinayak AS of Prajavani in his review appreciated the story, performance of the actors and the background score while criticism directed towards predictability and the songs which were not memorable. Avinash Ram of VijayKarnataka described the film as "A medical thriller that unfolds a surprise in the medical world" and appreciated the writers for weaving various layers in the film smoothly. He also compared the film to the 1997 film "Manava 2022" and said though the idea looks similar, O2 is said in a scientific way.
