= Kaaneyaadavara Bagge Prakatane =

Kannada-language film

- Directed by: Anil Kumar
- Produced by: Naveen Kumar
- Starring: Rangayana Raghu; Tabla Nani; P. Ravishankar; Ashika Ranganath; Chikkanna; Tilak Shekar
- Cinematography: Shivakumar
- Edited by: K. M. Prakash
- Music by: Arjun Janya
- Production company: A. J. Talkies
- Release date: 27 May 2022
- Country: India
- Language: Kannada

Kaneyadavara Bagge Prakatane (lit. 'Missing person notice') is a 2022 Indian Kannada-language comedy-drama film directed by Anil Kumar. It stars Rangayana Raghu, P. Ravi Shankar, Tabla Nani, Chikkanna, Tilak Shekar, and Ashika Ranganath.

== Cast ==
- Ashika Ranganath as Rashmika
- Tilak Shekar as Yashwant
- Rangayana Raghu as Rangappa
- Tabla Nani as Narayanappa
- Chikkanna as Chikku
- P. Ravishankar as Krishnamurthy

== Soundtrack ==
No.	Title	Length
1.	"Usire Sereyagide"	3:12
2.	"Bang Bang Bangkok"	3:28
3.	"E Badukeega kaalimane"	2:57
4.	"Ka kaa ko ki kee ko"	3:14
