= Narayanan Krishnan =

Indian chef-turned-social worker (born 1981)

- Born: 1981 (age 44–45); Madurai, Tamil Nadu
- Citizenship: Indian
- Occupation: Social Worker / Chef (past)
- Known for: Feeding Homeless
- Website: http://www.akshayatrust.org/

Narayanan Krishnan (born 1981) is an Indian chef-turned-social worker.

== Early life ==
Krishnan was an award-winning chef with Taj Hotels, Bangalore and was short-listed for an elite job in Switzerland. After witnessing a distressing incident in 2002, he quit his job and began feeding the homeless and mentally disabled in his hometown.

== Career ==
Krishnan founded the Akshaya Trust organization in 2003, which helps to feed the homeless and mentally-disabled in Madurai, Tamil Nadu. He serves breakfast, lunch and dinner to 425 indigent and elderly people in Madurai.

He also provides haircuts and shaves to give dignity to those he serves. He was selected as one of the Top 10 in "CNN heroes 2010" list.

The character Narayanan Krishnan played by Jayaprakash in the 2012 Malayalam film Ustad Hotel is based on him.

== Controversy ==
In June 2014 a 23-year-old inmate who left the Akshaya Trust home alleged that she was sexually abused. The news was featured in the media. Although the Akshaya Trust home was exonerated by the Madurai Bench of the Madras High Court, It was asked to submit regular monthly reports, due to the rather high number of human rights abuses that have been reported from the home.

== See also ==
- CNN Heroes
