= Ustad Hotel =

- Theatrical release Poster
- Directed by: Anwar Rasheed
- Written by: Anjali Menon
- Produced by: Listin Stephen
- Starring: Dulquer Salmaan; Thilakan; Nithya Menen
- Narrated by: Mamukkoya
- Cinematography: Loganathan Srinivasan
- Edited by: Praveen Prabhakar
- Music by: Gopi Sunder
- Production company: Magic Frames
- Distributed by: Central Pictures
- Release date: 29 June 2012 (India)
- Running time: 150 minutes
- Country: India
- Language: Malayalam
- Box office: ₹15 crore

Ustad Hotel is a 2012 Indian Malayalam-language drama film directed by Anwar Rasheed, written by Anjali Menon and produced by Listin Stephen. The film stars Dulquer Salmaan, Thilakan and Nithya Menen with Siddique, Mamukkoya, and Lena in supporting roles, along with Asif Ali and Jishnu in cameo roles. The film features music composed by Gopi Sundar, cinematography by Loganathan Srinivasan and editing by Praveen Prabhakar respectively.

The story is about a young man named Faizal, known as Faizi (Dulquer), who studies in Switzerland as a chef against the wishes of his father (Siddique). When this matter comes to light, his father snatches away his passport to prevent him from taking up a new job in the UK. As the relation between father and son deteriorates, Faizi is forced to work as a cook in a restaurant in Kozhikode, run by his grandfather Karim (Thilakan) until he can plan something alternate.

Ustad Hotel released on 29 June 2012 in Kerala, and 20 July 2012 elsewhere in India. The film was a commercial success. It won three National Film Awards, for Best Popular Film, Menon won the award for Best Dialogues and Thilakan got a Special Mention (posthumously). It was remade in Kannada as Gowdru Hotel (2017) and dubbed and released in Telugu as Janatha Hotel. Ustad Hotel is considered among the best films made during the New-Gen cinema movement in Malayalam and gained cult film status. It is also noted as the last film appearance of veteran actor Thilakan released before his death.

== Plot ==
Abdul Razak and Fareeda, a Muslim couple in Kerala, are expecting their first child. Razak wants the child to be a boy and wants to name the child Faizal and call him Faizi. To his disappointment, the child is a girl. Over the years, Fareeda gives birth to three more girls, which irritates Abdul Razak, who migrates to Dubai. Finally, Fareeda gives birth to a boy but, due to her repeated pregnancies, Fareeda becomes ill and dies. Abdul Razak takes his five children to Dubai. Faizi is looked after by his four sisters whom he affectionately calls "Ithathas & Company" (Sisters and Company).

As Faizi grows up, his sisters get married one by one and his father marries for a second time. Faizi hopes to be a chef, much against his father's aspirations. Faizi goes to Switzerland to study hotel management at the University of Lausanne. When he returns to Kerala with much fanfare after the course, his father arranges his marriage with Shahana, an interior designer and Abdul Razak's close friend's daughter. Faizi secretly reveals to her that he studied to become a chef and not hotel management. Angered by this, Shahana's family cancels the wedding and Abdul Razak is humiliated.

Angered by the humiliation, Razak takes custody of Faizi's passport and credit cards so that Faizi cannot go to London, where he has received a job offer as a sous chef at The Ivy restaurant. In anger, Faizi travels to Kozhikode to join his grandfather Kareem who is affectionately called "Kareem Ikka" locally. Kareem has been managing Ustad Hotel (named by local people since Ustad means master in Malayalam) for the last 35 years.

Faizi is in Kozhikode longer than he had anticipated. During his stay with his grandfather, Faizi gets involved in the daily activities of Ustad Hotel. He strikes friendships with the members of the band "Kallumakkayas" (mussels) as well as with the employees at the hotel. Kareem Ikka later gets him a job at the nearby "Beach Bay" restaurant. The band invite Faizi to a gig and he notices that the lead singer of the band is Shahana, who is secretly pursuing singing. The gig becomes a hit, and though initially hesitant at meeting each other, when Shahana needs a ride back home, Faizi agrees to drop her. They bond while travelling and she tells him that "today is the last day of my freedom" as she is getting engaged the next day and her conservative family will not allow her dreams. Later, he meets Shahana and her fiancé Mehroof in Beach Bay where Mehroof insults him. Shahana later breaks up with Mehroof and tells Faizi she made a mistake in rejecting him earlier.

During a celebration at Beach Bay, Faizi sees a plan to expand Beach Bay which includes Karim Ikka's property and Ustad Hotel. With Shahana's help, he figures out that the owner of Beach Bay wants to acquire the land on which Ustad Hotel stands. Kareem Ikka having taken a bank loan and was struggling to pay it back was at the mercy of the bank which was conspiring with the owner of Beach Bay to seize the restaurant. Faizi and the owner have a confrontation and the owner bribes the local health department and gets Ustad Hotel closed down, citing unhygienic conditions. Faizi collects money from the employees and Kareem Ikka's well-wishers and renovates the hotel. Shahana, too, joins Faizi and they reopen the restaurant, which becomes very successful and enables them to clear the debts. Faizi then receives a new job offer to work as an executive chef in a restaurant in Marseille, France.

When he breaks this news to his grandfather, Kareem Ikka has a heart attack and is hospitalized. At the hospital, he asks Faizi to visit his friend Narayanan Krishnan in Madurai, whom Kareem Ikka had been funding to feed the poor. On seeing how the poor struggle for food, Faizi now understands the meaning of his grandfather's words that "anyone can fill a stomach, but only a good cook can fill the heart as well". By the time Faizi comes back, Kareem Ikka decides to leave everything behind and go on a pilgrimage to the Sufi shrines in North India, his lifelong ambition. A repentant Abdul Razak gives back Faizi his passport, but Faizi changes his mind and stays with Ustad Hotel. He marries Shahana, who helps him run the restaurant. In the end Kareem Ikka can be seen on a pilgrimage in Ajmer.

== Cast ==
- Dulquer Salmaan as Faizal "Faizi" Abdul Razak
- Thilakan as Kareem Abdul Jabbar, Abdul Razak's father and Faizal's grandfather
  - Jagan Reju as Young Kareem
- Siddique as Abdul Razak Mohammed, Kareem's son and Faizal's father
- Nithya Menen as Shahana, Faizal's love interest, later his wife
- Mamukkoya as Ummar
- Kunchan as Driver Abdullah
- Jayaprakash as Narayanan Krishnan
- Assim Jamal as Moideen: Brother-in-law of Abdul Razak
- Manian Pillai Raju as Chef Babu
- Praveena as Fareeda: Mother of Faizal
- Lena as Fatima: Oldest sister of Faizal
- Meghna Nair as Fausia: Second oldest sister of Faizal
- Mythili as Firoza: Third oldest sister of Faizal
- Sija Rose as Fazeeha: Fourth oldest sister of Faizal
- Bhagath Manuel as a Band member
- Sreenath Bhasi as a Band member
- Littil Swayamp as a band member
- Joseph Chakola as a Band member
- Jinu Joseph as Chairman of Beach Bay Group
- Prem Prakash as Bank Manager
- Prayaga Martin as Shahana's sister
- Theepetti Ganesan as Ismail
- Malavika Nair as Moulavi's daughter; Faisal's late grandmother
- Sal Yusuf as Chef (voice)
- Avinash Sivadas Vettiyattil as The Molestor
- Dominica as Christina
- Ashwathy as Jenny
- Sithara as Shakela
- Arafaath Ansaari
- Vishnu Vijayan
- Tinu Thomas Kannur

=== Special appearances ===
- Jishnu Raghavan as Meharoof
- Asif Ali as Himself
- Raj Kalesh as Interviewer
- Dinesh Prabhakar as News reporter
- Kalabhavan Shajon as Driver
- Suvith Krishna

== Production ==
=== Development ===
Ustad Hotel was scripted by Anjali Menon; it was the first script she wrote for someone else. The film was born from the friendship Anjali and Anwar Rasheed shared when they worked together in Kerala Cafe, in which Anwar directed the featurette Bridge. Narrating the way the idea evolved, Anwar Rasheed said, "the thread of the movie came out in a telephonic conversation with Anjali Menon, script writer of the movie. Post Bridge, we decided to do a movie together. After discussing two-three projects, we thought why can't we do a food related movie. We postponed the movie idea and then Salt N' Pepper was released. This movie has no similarity with Salt N Pepper except that both deals with food."

Anjali says, "When we met and talked about his past films, Anwar Rasheed told me once, 'Anjali, I want to make a film in which I compromise the least.' That kind of stuck in my head. I wanted to write something in which he wouldn't have to compromise." Anjali wrote the script during a stay in Calicut. She says, "Soon after I discovered I was pregnant, I moved to Calicut to be with my mother. As she and the rest of the family showered me with affection as only Kozhikodans truly can ... I began to think of the peculiarity of the local culture especially with food and hospitality. I started to read up about the Arab past and for some reason ended up with Sufi philosophy. Many folks ask me if I had researched the hotel industry, food preparation etc. but the truth is that the core of my research was around Sufism, which celebrates food, music, dance, creativity, art, romance and finds the divine in all such aspects of life. It seemed natural that the film, too should be such an exploration of a new generation person into such mode of thought and life." Anjali wrote the film in English, in which it remained until the seventh draft, then rewrote it in Malayalam. She said, "I remember the opening line – 'The idea of Faizi began before him.' When I wrote in Malayalam it became, 'Faizi-nte katha oon janikinnekal munpe todangi.' That is when it really hit Anwar." The film was produced by Listin Stephen, and production began on 21 November 2011 with a pooja ceremony organised at Hotel Sarovaram in Kochi. It was planned for release in April 2012.

=== Casting ===
The project was announced in November 2011. The first actors cast included Dulquer Salmaan, Nithya Menen and Thilakan. Initially, Tamil actor Siddharth was considered for the lead role, but he rejected the offer, which was later given to Dulquer Salmaan. When asked why he chose Ustad Hotel as his second film, Dulquer said, "This is a coming-of-age film and it is a genre I rather like; I enjoyed films such as Wake Up Sid and Udaan and wanted to do one like that myself. I like the character of Faizi too." Director Anwar Rasheed was sure none other than Thilakan could do justice to Kareem Ikka's role and, despite his health problems, it was instantly given to the veteran actor. Thilakan said, "It is a great role, the kind that I enjoy doing at this stage of my career. I want to do roles like this that offer me some challenges as an actor".

Nithya Menen was cast for the female lead despite a ban imposed upon the actress by the producers's association. Footballer Suvith Krishna, who represented the Kerala team from 2004 to 2010 and is a professional model, made his film debut as a keyboardist in the song sequence "Appangalembadum". Singer Reju Joseph's son Jagan Reju played the role of teenage Kareem. Anwar Rasheed says that he accidentally saw Jagan's Facebook profile and was stunned by the boy's resemblance to Thilakan in his teenage years. Jagan says, "Anwar Rasheed Sir just saw my photos on Facebook. It was an unexpected call and when I went to meet him, he was surprised and asked me whether I will play the teenage role of Thilakan Sir." The only drawback was that Jagan was too tall compared to Thilakan; he covered this by taking some close and mid-close shots. Jagan was shown only in flashback without any dialogue.

The cinematographer was Loganathan Srinivasan, the film was produced under the banner of Magic Frames, and the songs were composed by Gopi Sunder with lyrics by Rafeeq Ahmed. Praveen Prabhakar edited the film, art direction was by Bipin Chandran and Sameera Sanish designed the costumes. The sound designing was done by M. R. Rajakrishnan. Ustad Hotel was in production for one-and-a-half years. Anwar says, "From the time the script was written till it hit the screen, I was out of the house. It took one-and-a-half years."

=== Filming ===
Filming began in January 2012 and the main location was Calicut Beach. It took a full day for art director Anand to build the restaurant on the beach-side. A report by The Hindu said, "There are quite a few people on the beach and they are surprised to see a new hotel named 'Ustad Hotel' that has sprung up overnight. It is only a little later that visitors to the beach realise that it's not a real hotel, but the set for Anwar Rasheed's new film Ustad Hotel!"

== Themes and influences ==
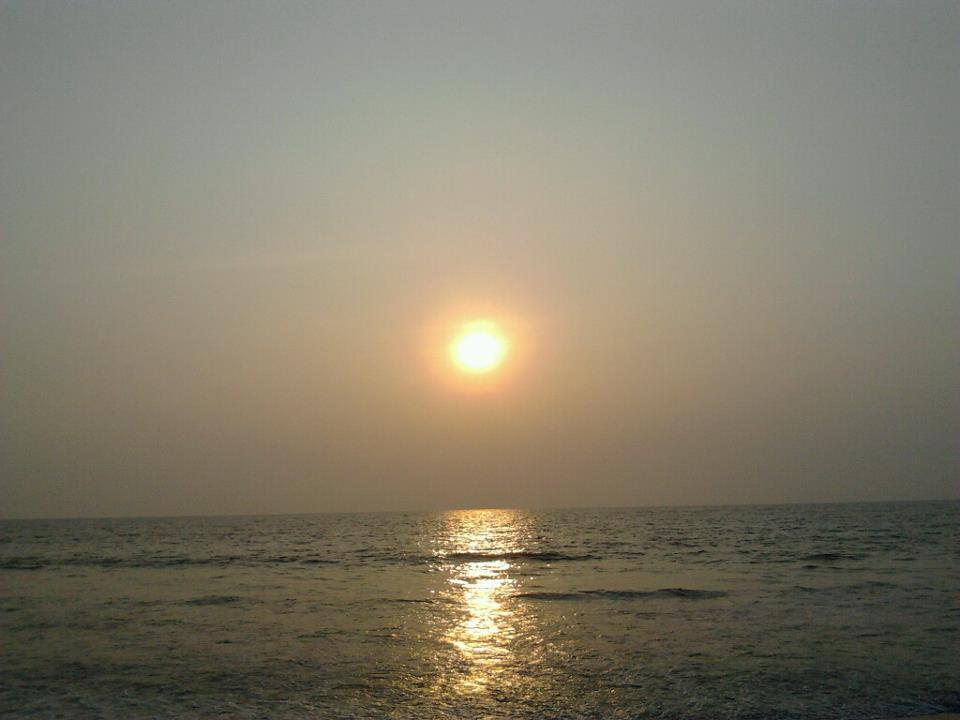
Sun setting over Calicut beach. A large part of the film takes place on the beach at Calicut.

Food and its nuances becomes a central character in the film and act as a catalyst of personal transformation. There are many references to Malabari cuisine, including long sequences of cooking, of main characters enjoying cooking and of actors talking about food. In one of the scenes, the obsession with a good cup of Suleimani (black tea) and the paraphernalia that surrounds it is shown. When asked about the origins of this story, Anjali Menon replied, "I am a complete foodie and I believe that every time we consume something we must give it full attention to enjoy every flavor. That is the root of the story. Distinct flavors of tea, sweetness and sourness come together in a Suleimani creating a blend of experience that stimulates us – quite like romance, I think."

The story revolves around a typical Mappilla community from Kozhikode, with several lingual references, accent references and other signifiers. Anjali says, "Any script or film deserves to be treated with full respect for where it is located because at the end there is a reason why a certain story is set in a certain place. To me, it is the most basic thing to find signifiers from within the location to propel the story ahead."

After its release, claims arose that it has faint resemblance to the 2009 German comedy film Soul Kitchen. Anjali Menon denied the accusation outright and stated, "I haven't watched Soul Kitchen. There are a lot of food films all over the world and many that are centred around the renovation of a restaurant. I am a big fan of food films." It also has similarities to the 2009 comedy Today's Special.

== Music ==
The five-song soundtrack was composed by Gopi Sunder, with lyrics by Rafeeq Ahammed and was released by Satyam Audios on 22 June 2012. The song "Appangalembadum" became popular among children and young adults and was one of the biggest hits of the year, while "Mel Mel Mel" and "Vaathilil Aa Vaathilil" were also successful.

The score features adaptations of the tracks "Road to Chicago" from Road to Perdition, both original scores composed by Thomas Newman and nominated for Academy Award for Original Music Score. The highly acclaimed background score in the scene where the hero and heroine run away alighting a lorry, is a rip-off from the piece "La petite fille de la mer" by Vangelis.

== Release ==
=== Theatrical ===
The film was scheduled to release on 11 May 2012 but, due to some issues, the release was delayed. In July 2012 some media reported that the release would be delayed again as it was not approved by the Animal Welfare Board of India (AWBI), which received a complaint stating that camels were used in a song sequence without permission. The reports said that the releasing board prevented the film's screening. Director Anwar Rasheed denied the charges and said, "The song sequence was shot in Rajasthan after getting the permit and there is no complaints against the movie."

Ustad Hotel was released on 29 June 2012 on 73 screens across India, alongside Namukku Parkkan and No. 66 Madhura Bus. Ustad Hotel was also released in major cities outside Kerala and in the United Kingdom, United States and Persian Gulf countries on 20 July 2012.

=== Home media ===
In October 2012, Movie Channel released Ustad Hotel on Blu-ray and DVD. Following a petition filed by Movie Channel, the 6th Additional District High Court of Kochi issued a John Doe order that empowers the film's owners to restrain suspected and unknown defendants from illegal distribution. Ustad Hotel was one of the first Malayalam films to be granted the John Doe order – so called because it is an injunction sought against someone whose identity is not known.

== Reception ==
=== Box office ===
In its opening day, Ustad Hotel collected around ₹40 lakhs in Kochi box office and ₹10 lakhs in United Kingdom. The film grossed ₹7.65 crore in 28 days from 60 screens in Kerala. The film completed 50 days in 22 theatres and collected ₹10 crore from the Kerala box office and 15 crore worldwide. It collected US$2178 from the UK box office. The film became a box office success and completed 100 days theatrical run.

=== Critical response ===
Aswin J. Kumar of The Times of India gave 3.5/5 stars and wrote, "There is a certain warmth about Ustad Hotel. In a film that gently meanders along touching upon facets of love between a man and a woman, a father and a son, and a grandfather and grandson, the elements are infused with precision." Dalton L of Deccan Chronicle gave 3/5 stars, and wrote, "Fusing the conservative with the modern, a virtuous woman happily swaps her purdah for a pair of jeans and a mike, and a traditional mappila song reverberates, powerfully, with a rocking punch." In her review for The Hindu, Nidhi Surendranath stated, Ustad Hotel "is a mix of endearing characters and poignant images that hits the audience with warmth and energy." Anil R. Nair of The New Indian Express called Ustad Hotel an "appealing film which seems to have got everything simply right especially because of the star cast." He praised the script, direction, cinematography and music.

Paresh C. Palicha of Rediff gave the movie 3.5/5 stars, saying that "Writer Anjali Menon and director Anwar Rasheed have given us a delicious meal at Ustad Hotel." Sify gave a verdict of "Go for it" and wrote, "Ustad Hotel may not shock you with some thrilling plots or dramatic twists, but it is an entertaining watch that can bring smiles on your faces or at certain other instances can make your eyes moist. It could definitely have been less lengthy and more gripping, but it is worth a watch even in this form."

Malavika Velayanikal, in an article written for Daily News and Analysis, criticised the Mappila dialect used by the lead actors and wrote, "They [the lead actors] have acted well, but messed up the accent. Salmaan can be forgiven since his character supposedly lived in the Persian Gulf and studied in Switzerland. But the others have no such excuse. I enjoyed the film, loved its spunky and real characters, but the wrong pronunciation took away some of the pleasure."

=== Accolades ===
Ceremony	Category	Nominee	Result	Ref.
National Film Awards 2012	Best Popular Film Providing Wholesome Entertainment	Magic Frames	Won	
National Film Awards 2012	Best Dialogues	Anjali Menon	Won	
National Film Awards 2012	Special Mention	Thilakan	Won	
15th Asianet Film Awards	Best Film	Magic Frames	Won	
15th Asianet Film Awards	Best Script Writer	Anjali Menon	Won	
15th Asianet Film Awards	Best Music Director	Gopi Sundar	Won	
15th Asianet Film Awards	Best Lyricist	Rafeeq Ahammed	Won	
60th Filmfare Awards South	Filmfare Award for Best Male Debut – South	Dulquer Salmaan	Won	
60th Filmfare Awards South	Best Film	Magic Frames	Nominated	
60th Filmfare Awards South	Best Director	Anwar Rasheed	Nominated	
60th Filmfare Awards South	Best Actor	Dulquer Salmaan	Nominated	
60th Filmfare Awards South	Best Supporting Actor	Thilakan	Nominated	
60th Filmfare Awards South	Best Music Director	Gopi Sundar	Nominated	
60th Filmfare Awards South	Best Playback Singer - Male	Haricharan (for "Vaathilil Aa Vaathilil")	Nominated	
1st Mohan Raghavan Awards	Best Director	Anwar Rasheed	Won	
2nd South Indian International Movie Awards	Best Film	Magic Frames	Won	
2nd South Indian International Movie Awards	Best Director	Anwar Rasheed	Nominated	
2nd South Indian International Movie Awards	Best Cinematographer	Loganathan Srinivasan	Nominated	
2nd South Indian International Movie Awards	Best Actor in a Supporting Role	Thilakan	Nominated	
2nd South Indian International Movie Awards	Best Music Director	Gopi Sundar	Nominated	
2nd South Indian International Movie Awards	Best Female Playback Singer	Anna Katharina Valayil (for "Appangalembadum")	Nominated	
Kochi Times Film Awards	Best Film	Magic Frames	Won	
Kochi Times Film Awards	Best Singer – Male	Haricharan (for "Vaathilil Aa Vaathilil")	Won	
Kochi Times Film Awards	Best Singer – Female	Anna Katharina Valayil (for "Appangalembadum")	Won	
Kochi Times Film Awards	Best Music Director	Gopi Sunder	Won	
Kochi Times Film Awards	Best Actor – Male	Dulquer Salmaan	Nominated	
Kochi Times Film Awards	Best Director	Anwar Rasheed	Nominated	
Kochi Times Film Awards	Best Lyrics	Rafeeq Ahmed (for "Vaathilil Aa Vaathilil")	Nominated	
Asiavision Awards	Family Movie	Magic Frames	Won	
Asiavision Awards	Character Actor	Thilakan	Won	
Asiavision Awards	Promising Singer – Female	Anna Katharina Valayil (for "Appangalembadum")	Won	
Vanitha Film Award	Best Film	Magic Frames	Won	
Vanitha Film Award	Best Script Writer	Anjali Menon	Won	
Vanitha Film Award	Best Pair	Dulquer Salmaan and Nithya Menen	Won	

== Remakes ==
A Tamil remake of this film titled Thalappakkatti was announced in 2014, with Vikram Prabhu, Nazriya Nazim and Rajkiran reprising the roles of Dulquer Salmaan, Nithya Menen and Thilakan respectively however it got shelved. The film was remade in Kannada as Gowdru Hotel in 2017.

== Legacy ==
Dulquer Salmaan's performance as Faizi was included in The Times of India amongst 20 Best Malayalam film performances of the past two decades.

== In popular culture ==
A restaurant named Ustad Hotel, said to be inspired by the film, was opened at Pettah Junction in Thiruvananthapuram. The restaurant board, its use of colours and the tyre with the name Ustad Hotel mimic those portrayed in the film.
