= Moonnamathoral =

2006 Indian film

- Poster
- Directed by: V. K. Prakash
- Written by: Rajesh Jayaraman
- Produced by: Benzy Martin
- Starring: Jayaram; Jyothirmayi; Vineeth; Samvrutha Sunil; Sherin Shringar
- Cinematography: Loganathan Srinivasan
- Edited by: Don Max
- Music by: Ousepachan
- Production company: Fairy Queen Productions
- Distributed by: Emil & Eric Digital Films
- Release date: 25 August 2006
- Country: India
- Language: Malayalam

Moonnamathoral (transl. A third person) is a 2006 Indian Malayalam-language supernatural horror mystery thriller film directed by V. K. Prakash and written by Rajesh Jayaraman. It stars Jayaram, Vineeth, Samvrutha Sunil, Sherin Shringar, and Jyothirmayi.

The film was the first Malayalam film to be digitally distributed to theatres via satellite. It was also the first Malayalam film to be shot entirely using high-definition (HD) cameras. The film was released on 18 August 2006.

== Plot ==
Two young girls, Anupama and Rahel, rent an old bungalow and are disturbed by the presence of a strange lady who moves around their place. One night, they both see a haunting dream in which someone is trying to kill them, and they wake up from that nightmare. Suddenly, they realise that both girls had the same dream. They are scared about the incident and decide to leave the place the following day. The next morning, unsure of what occurred, Rahel chooses to consult the events that happened with Dr. Arun, and they go to his house to meet him. When they reach, they call out his name, but Dr. Arun does not hear anything and goes inside. Confused, Rahel and Anu suddenly see a newspaper in which their 30th death orders are printed and are shocked by the reality that they are dead. They decide to take revenge and find out how they were killed. The second story begins as the girls find moving forward in their inquiry challenging.

The second story follows when Jeeva, a police officer, falls in love with Bala, a budding writer. Their professions interfere with their personal lives, preventing them from any severe romance before marriage. Soon after their wedding, Jeeva receives a job transfer to the high ranges of Idukki. Bala is excited at the prospect, as she feels the salubrious mountain atmosphere will help nurture her writing skills. Jeeva also considers it a perfect opportunity to rekindle their lost romance.

However, despite the positive atmosphere, life at the bungalow soon takes an unexpected twist. Life for the couple turns uneasy as Bala senses someone, apart from the two of them, inhabiting the bungalow. Haunted by a perpetual paranoia, she wakes up most nights to nightmares. Concerned with how their marriage turns out, Jeeva finally agrees to investigate. The investigation leads him into the unknown realms of the bungalow's shady past, unraveling a forgotten history, thus leading to a startling realisation of who the "third someone" is. He started his investigation at the place where both the girls stayed. There, he met with a woman who gave him a bag which was left behind. From this, Jeeva got a greeting card written for Dr. Arun. Jeeva decides to meet him before he leaves for Australia. So he went to the hospital to meet him, and Jeeva revealed to Dr. Arun that Anu had feelings for him. Dr. Arun says he does not know about this and leaves for home to pack his luggage. From there, Dr. Arun remembers his flashback. Where it is shown that Dr. Arun invites Anu to his place. Anu and Rahel went to his house, and Anu went inside, leaving Rahel behind to wait for her. Dr. Arun shows his true psychic character and tries to rape Anu. Upon hearing screaming, Rahel goes inside to save her.

At last, both of them were killed. So, he decides to abandon their bodies by hanging them on the tree. After realising the truth, the spirits of both of them decided to kill him. On the night of his packing, both souls entered Bala's body and killed Dr. Arun. He was making his soul wander in the place. Both girls' spirits are accessible to the world.

== Cast ==
- Jayaram as C.I Jeevan
- Jyothirmai as Bala
- Vineeth as Dr. Arun
- Sherin Shringar as Rahael
- Samvrutha Sunil as Anupama
- Murali Menon as Vijayan Menon
- Harisree Ashokan
- Mala Aravindan
- Prem Prakash
- Kunjan
- Ashraf
- Kulappulli Leela
- Maya Viswanath

== Production ==
Mumbai-based DG2L Technologies developed the new technology.. The digital technology used for the film was provided in Kerala by Emil & Eric Digital Private Limited, a Thrissur-based company. The film was shot primarily at Peerumedu in Idukki.

== Release ==
Nearly 80 theatres across Kerala were equipped with digital transponders to receive the film via satellite.

== Reception ==
A critic noted that "V. K. Prakash manages to maintain the film's tempo and gets the aid of visual and sound effects to maintain the horror effect throughout".

Another critic opined that "the film's highlight is Loganathan Srinivasan's camera, which commenced its terrifying journey, and the audio track, which assumed a menacing pitch".

== See also ==
- List of Malayalam horror films
