= Amigos (film) =

2023 Indian film by Rajendra Reddy

- Theatrical release poster
- Directed by: Rajendra Reddy
- Written by: Rajendra Reddy
- Produced by: Naveen Yerneni; Yalamanchili Ravi Shankar
- Starring: Nandamuri Kalyan Ram; Ashika Ranganath
- Cinematography: Soundararajan
- Edited by: Tammiraju
- Music by: Ghibran
- Production company: Mythri Movie Makers
- Release date: 10 February 2023
- Running time: 137 minutes
- Country: India
- Language: Telugu
- Box office: est. ₹11.70 crore

Amigos (transl. Friends (Note: Amigos is Spanish for friends.)) is a 2023 Indian Telugu-language action thriller film directed by Rajendra Reddy and produced by Mythri Movie Makers. The film features Nandamuri Kalyan Ram in a triple role, while Ashika Ranganath, Brahmaji, Saptagiri, Jayaprakash, Satyam Rajesh, Raghu Karumanchi and Ravi Prakash appear in supporting roles. The music was composed by Ghibran, while the cinematography and editing were handled by Soundararajan and Tammiraju.

The film was announced in August 2022, and principal photography commenced on 27 August 2022. Filming took place in various locations across Hyderabad, Bangalore, Kolkata, and Goa.

Amigos was released on 10 February 2023 to mixed reviews from critics and bombed at the box office.

== Plot ==
Siddharth Chiguluri locates his doppelgängers Manjunath Hegde and Michael on a website Doppel.com and contacts them to meet each other in Goa. After introducing each other, the trio becomes friends, and all goes well until Manjunath is suddenly ambushed and subsequently detained by the NIA. It later seems that Michael was actually an international firearms and possible terrorist. It is revealed that Michael is Bipin Roy, a drug lord wanted by the NIA. Michael used the doppelganger service to create the façade that he actually died, although he was planning to replace Siddharth entirely. Siddharth also learns about Michael's plan to use them as scapegoats and decides to foil his plans and save Manjunath.

== Cast ==
- Nandamuri Kalyan Ram in a triple role as
  - Siddharth (Siddhu), an entrepreneur businessman
  - Manjunath Hegde (Manju), a software engineer in Bangalore
  - Michael alias Bipin Roy, a dreaded illegal arms dealer wanted by the NIA
- Ashika Ranganath as Ishika, a radio personality and Siddhu's love interest
- Brahmaji as Siddharth's uncle
- Saptagiri as Believer of doppelgängers
- Jayaprakash as Jayendra, Siddharth's father
- Satyam Rajesh as Landowner
- Raghu Karumanchi as Phone Stealer
- Ravi Prakash as Ravi, NIA officer
- Sivannarayana as Ishika's father
- Kireeti Damaraju as Walking Google
- Kalyani Natarajan as Siddharth's mother
- Rajeev Pillai as NIA officer
- Chaitanya Krishna as Sathi's doppelgänger
- Vincent Asokan as NIA officer Mohan Pandey
- Rajashree Nair as Ishika's mother
- Mathew Varghese as NIA officer Mathew
- Pranavi Manukonda as Siddharth's sister
- Subhashree Rayaguru as NIA officer
- Manik Reddy as Handbag Stealer
- Gabbarsingh Sai as Chain Snatcher

== Music ==
The film score and soundtrack were composed by Ghibran. The first single, "Yeka Yeka", was released on 19 January 2023. Another single, "Enno Ratrulosthayi", released on 31 January 2023. It is a remix of the original composition by Ilaiyaraaja for Dharma Kshetram (1992).

No.	Title	Lyrics	Singer(s)	Length
1.	"Enno Ratrulosthayi"	Veturi Sundararama Murthy	S. P. Charan, Sameera Bharadwaj	5:04
2.	"Yeka Yeka"	Ramajogayya Sastry	Anurag Kulkarni	4:08
3.	"Monster Theme"			1:32

== Release ==
=== Theatrical ===
The film was released in theaters on 10 February 2023.

=== Home media ===
The satellite and digital rights of the film were acquired by Gemini TV and Netflix, respectively. The film premiered on Netflix on 1 April 2023.

== Reception ==
=== Critical response ===
Amigos received mixed reviews from critics.

Sangeetha Devi Dundoo of The Hindu wrote "Kalyan Ram does try to shoulder the proceedings, but had the writing been better, this could have been a gripping thriller drama. Ghibran’s soundtrack adds some drama but ultimately, Amigos ends up as an interesting idea that does not take off." Paul Nicodemus of The Times of India gave 3 out of 5 stars and wrote "Overall, Nandamuri Kalyan Ram’s acting prowess and presence, with a touch of action and comedy, make this action thriller work in parts. His portal of Bipin stands out. It’s not a perfect film, but it has enough to keep the viewer engaged."

Latha Srinivasan of India Today gave 2.5 out of 5 stars and wrote "At the outset, the storyline is interesting and, seeing the success of playing dual roles in Bimbisara, Kalyan Ram has gone the extra mile and played a triple role in this Amigos. Director Rajendra Reddy has tried to give all three men – Manju, Michael and Siddhu – different characterisations, but he has succeeded the most only with Michael, who has come scope for performance."
