= Pulliman (2010 film) =

- A promotional poster
- Directed by: Anil K. Nair
- Written by: Anil K. Nair
- Produced by: Antony Paimpalli
- Starring: Kalabhavan Mani; Meera Nandan
- Cinematography: Rajaratnam
- Edited by: K Sreenivas
- Music by: Sharreth
- Production company: Rubans Media International
- Distributed by: Rubans Media International
- Release date: 9 April 2010
- Country: India
- Language: Malayalam

Pulliman (transl. Spotted Deer) is a 2010 Indian Malayalam-language drama film written and directed by Anil K. Nair. The film stars Kalabhavan Mani and Meera Nandan in the lead roles. The music for the film was composed by Sharreth.

== Plot ==
Kunjunni is a youngster in Perimannur village who is loved by all. Radha belongs to a nadodi gang, who has come to the village to sell statuettes of Lord Krishna. Kunjunni and Radha are in love. Radha's father forbids her to marry the orphan. Kunjunni later finds out that he actually belongs to a rich family and had left home some twenty years back, as his mother Yashoda Panicker was narcist and was against his achievement, which made him mentally weak.

== Cast ==
- Kalabhavan Mani as Kunjunni
- Meera Nandan as Radha
- Ponvannan as Kaalan Vasu
- Rajendran as Dasappan
- Nedumudi Venu
- Vijayaraghavan
- Sudheesh
- Sreejith Ravi as Ansari
- Jaffar Idukki
- Kochu Preman
- Geetha Salam
- Saranya Ponvannan as Yashoda Panicker
- Kalaranjini
- Jayashree Sivadhas as Radha’s Sister
- Seema G. Nair
- Ambika Mohan as Principal
- Shivaji Guruvayoor as Panicker
- Mukundan
- Mohanan Ayooor as Raghavan

== Soundtrack ==
The music for the film was composed by Sharreth and songs were released by Satyam Audios on 9 April 2010.

Pulliman
No.	Title	Singer(s)	Length
1.	"Thane Thane (Male)"	Vineeth Sreenivasan	4:57
2.	"Kaliyarangu"	Sannidanandan	4:56
3.	"Oh Vaname"	K. K. Nishad	2:15
4.	"Anandam"	Sharreth	4:37
5.	"Thane Thane (Female)"	Manisha Sheen	4:56
6.	"Mallipoo"	Sithara, M. G. Sreekumar	1:54
7.	"Anandam (Pathos)"	Sharreth	4:41
8.	"Sadugudu"	Amrutha Suresh, M. G. Sreekumar	4:12
9.	"Salambakkam"	Sharreth, Aju	4:12
