= Crazy Boy (film) =

- Poster
- Directed by: Mahesh Babu
- Screenplay by: Ajay Kumar
- Story by: Ajay Kumar
- Produced by: G Chandru
- Starring: Dilip Prakash; Ashika Ranganath
- Cinematography: Shekhar Chandra
- Edited by: K. M. Prakash
- Music by: Jassie Gift
- Production company: Durga Parameshwari Amma Films
- Distributed by: Jayanna Films
- Release date: 19 August 2016
- Running time: 2:30 Hours
- Country: India
- Language: Kannada

Crazy Boy is a 2016 Kannada-language romantic drama film directed by Mahesh Babu and produced by G. Chandru under Durga Parameshwari Amma Films. The film stars debutants Dilip Prakash and Ashika Ranganath in the lead roles, while P. Ravi Shankar, Rangayana Raghu and Sadhu Kokila appear in supporting roles. The music was composed by Jassie Gift, while cinematography and editing were handled by Shekhar Chandra and K. M. Prakash.

Crazy Boy was released on 18 August 2016. The film was dubbed in Hindi with the same name and in Gujarati as Pahelo Divas.

== Plot ==
Arjun, a passionate and family guy, is raised by his father's friend, a mechanic, after the death of his parents in a car accident. Nandini, a rich college girl, soon falls for his good nature. Arjun also contests to become a college leader, which earns the wrath of Vikki, a high profile brat, but soon ends the rivalry and they become friends. However, their love life doesn't go smoothly after an incident, where Arjun's father gets insulted by Nandini's brother intentionally as he doesn't accept their relationship. Later, Nandini is introduced to her would-be-groom Manoj, a rich businessman, by Nandini's brother. However at a stage play, Arjun and Nandini get cleared of their misunderstanding and they reunite. In a fit of rage, Manoj tries to kill Nandini, but is captured by the police, who reveals that he is actually a fraud, running a gang of human traffickers. Nandini's brother realize his mistake and accepts their relationship.

== Cast ==
- Dilip Prakash as Arjun
- Ashika Ranganath as Nandini
- P. Ravi Shankar as Nandini's brother
- Rangayana Raghu as Arjun's adopted father
- Sadhu Kokila as a drama teacher
- Ananth Nag

== Soundtrack ==
Crazy Boy

Soundtrack album by Jassie Gift
- Released: July 06 2016
- Recorded: 2016
- Genre: Feature film soundtrack
- Label: Akash Audio

The movie music is composed by music director Jassie Gift. The soundtrack album rights is acquired by Akash Audio. Darshan and Santhanam jointly released audio CD of Kannada cinema ‘Crazy Boy’ of debut producer G Chandru in Durgaparameshwari Amma Films.

=== Track listing ===
No.	Title	Lyrics	Singer(s)	Length
1.	"Thirugi Node Gantogalla"	Anand	Puneeth Rajkumar
2.	"Vinanthi Maadalilla"	Dr. V. Nagendra Prasad	Shreya Ghoshal, Shaan
3.	"Naanene Nandene"	Anand	Tippu
4.	"Murida Sethuveya"	Dr. V. Nagendra Prasad	Shreya Ghoshal, Santhosh Venky
5.	"Arere Alele"	Anand	Aalap Raju, Sangeetha
6.	"Mugiligu Kadaligu"	Ghousepeer	Rajesh Krishnan
