= Pattathu Arasan =

2022 film directed by A. Sarkunam

- Poster
- Directed by: A. Sarkunam
- Written by: A. Sarkunam
- Produced by: Allirajah Subaskaran
- Starring: Atharvaa; Rajkiran; Ashika Ranganath
- Cinematography: Loganathan Srinivasan
- Edited by: Raja Mohammad
- Music by: Ghibran
- Production company: Lyca Productions
- Release date: 25 November 2022
- Running time: 137 minutes
- Country: India
- Language: Tamil

Pattathu Arasan (transl. Royal King) is a 2022 Tamil-language sports action drama film written and directed by A. Sarkunam and produced by Allirajah Subaskaran of Lyca Productions. It stars Atharvaa, Rajkiran, Ashika Ranganath and Radhika Sarathkumar in the lead roles. The plot is set against the backdrop of green-caped betel farms near Thiruvaiyaru. The music was composed by Ghibran, while Loganathan Srinivasan and Raja Mohammad handled the cinematography and editing, respectively. The film was released theatrically on 25 November 2022.

== Plot ==
Poththaari is a former kabaddi player who is widely regarded as one of the greatest players in his village. He has two wives. His family is a large family with children and grandchildren, who live happily in the same house. From his first wife, he has two sons and one daughter and grandchildren. His eldest son is Thavamani, and his second son is Sachimuthu. His second wife is dead. The whole family lives together happily.

One day, Poththaari sends his son Kanniyan, from his second wife, to play in a kabaddi match, where he dies. Kanniyan's wife Vijaya demands Poththaari to split his land in half, to which Poththari agrees. After that Vijaya and her son Chinnadurai cut ties with Poththaari and his family and start to live separately, which makes him sad.

A few years later, the whole village is celebrating Poththaari's 70th birthday as an auspicious occasion, where the children and grandchildren get their blessings from the elder couple. Chinnadurai seeks his blessing too and also tries to ask forgiveness to Poththaari and his family, but they do not accept it, and also his mother disagrees on him going to his grandfather's function.

One day, Poththaari's grandson Chelliah, who is a kabaddi player, gets a call from Tamil Thalaivaas coach Bhaskar, who had asked him to send his personal details. Sadagoppan, the grandson of the village president Peramaiyan gets to know of the conversation and informs it to Peramaiyan, who calls the minister to confirm that Chelliah got selected to play for the Kabaddi team Tamil Thalavalas, who will is to play in the Pro - Kabaddi tournament. The next day, Bhaskar asks him to come to The Tamil Thalaivaas office in Chennai and to get mat practice. To get mat practice, he needs to buy a mat, which would cost Rs. 3 lakh rupees, which he cannot afford. So, he asks Sadagoppan for help and he arranges a financier to get Chelliah a loan. When Chelliah goes to The Tamil Thalaivaas office, they inform him that Bhaskar is out-of-station. On Chelliah getting money from a financier and Sadagoppan gets hold CCTV footage and falsely blames Chelliah for receiving money to not play in the match between Arasakulam and Kalayarkovil, Poththaari and his family are not allowed to due to this. Because of the stress, Chelliah hangs himself.

Did Poththaari and his family reunite due to this, forms the rest of the story.

== Cast ==
- Atharvaa as Chinnadurai
- Rajkiran as Poththaari
- Ashika Ranganath as Pavithra
- Radhika Sarathkumar as Vijaya
- Jayaprakash as Thavamani
- R. K. Suresh as Kanniyan
- Bala Saravanan as Chinnadurai's friend
- Raj Ayyappa as Chellaiah
- Durai Sudhakar as Sachimuthu
- Singampuli as Kannan
- Ravi Kale
- Shatru as Sadagopan
- G. M. Kumar
- Senthi Kumari as Chellaiah's mother
- Srilekha Rajendran
- Srividya as Poththaari's second wife

== Production ==
The film was tentatively titled as Atharvaa 18. On 10 November 2022, the title of the film was announced to be Pattathu Arasan, with Lyca Productions releasing the first look poster of the film. Kannada actress Ashika Ranganath was chosen to play the female lead in this film. The film was majorly shot at the betel leaf plantation near Thanjavur.

== Music ==
Pattathu Arasan

Soundtrack album by M. Ghibran
- Released: 2022
- Recorded: 2022
- Genre: Feature film soundtrack
- Length: 21:33
- Language: Tamil
- Label: Think Music India

M. Ghibran chronology
Naan Mirugamaai Maara (2022)	Pattathu Arasan (2022)	Driver Jamuna (2022)

Singles from Pattathu Arasan
- 1. "Yaaro Yaaro Iva" Released: 18 November 2022

The music of the film is composed by Ghibran which marks his second collaboration with Atharvaa after Trigger and third collaboration with A. Sarkunam after Vaagai Sooda Vaa and Naiyaandi. The first single titled "Yaaro Yaaro Iva" was released on 18 November 2022.

Track listing
No.	Title	Lyrics	Singer(s)	Length
1.	"Yaaro Yaaro Iva"	Mani Amudhavan	Yazin Nazir	3:36
2.	"Anjanathi"	Mani Amudhavan	K.G Ranjith, Vandana Srinivasan	4:12
3.	"Raakku Raakku"	Mani Amudhavan	Gold Devaraj, Aravind Srinivas, Sarath Santosh, Shenbagaraj, Sai Vignesh	4:36
4.	"Thoga Mayil Thoga"	Viveka	Sathya prakash	4:38
5.	"Kaalaiyar Koyilula"	A. Sarkunam	Jayamoorthy	3:37
6.	"Thuliya Mazha Thuliya"	A. Sarkunam	Anudeep Dev	2:34
Total length:				21:33

== Release ==
=== Theatrical ===
The film was released theatrically on 25 November 2022. The trailer of the film was released on 18 November 2022.

=== Home media ===
The post theatrical streaming rights of the film were sold to Netflix.

== Reception ==
Logesh Balachandran of The Times of India rated the film 2.5 out of 5 stars and wrote "Overall, Sarkunam's Pattathu Arasan might work for a few but wish someone would bring inventive ideas into this genre." Yuvashree of ABP Live gave 2.5 out of 5 stars and wrote "If only some of the cringe sentimental scenes had been trimmed and a bit more fight scenes had been included, the titular king would have really rocked the bandwagon." Chandhini R of Cinema Express rated the film 2 out of 5 stars and wrote "Despite the never-ending barrage of rural dramas coming our way, it is a genre that still works because the right film made in this milieu can showcase the rootedness and vibe." Dinamalar rated the film 2.25 out of 5 stars. Sruthi Ganapathy Raman of Film Companion wrote "But when the film establishes the name of the only lead female character in the movie, well after 90 minutes into runtime, tokenism rears its ugly head. And its allegiance becomes clear." A critic for Cinema Vikatan wrote that by taking a familiar village story, the team of 'Pattathu Arasan' has created a boring film with scenes that are not new.
