= Garuda (2022 film) =

Indian Kannada film

- Film poster
- Directed by: Dhana Kumar K
- Written by: Siddharth Mahesh
- Produced by: B K Raja Reddy; Kishore A Prasad Reddy S
- Starring: Siddharth Mahesh; Srinagara Kitty; Aindrita Ray; Ashika Rangnath
- Cinematography: Jai Anand
- Music by: Raghu Dixit
- Production company: Orange Pixels
- Release date: 20 May 2022
- Country: India
- Language: Kannada

Garuda is a 2022 Indian Kannada-language action drama film directed by Dhana Kumar. K and written by Siddharth Mahesh. It stars Siddharth Mahesh, Srinagar Kitty, Aindrita Ray and Ashika Rangnath. While Raghu Dixit composed the soundtrack and background score, cinematography was handled by Jai Anand.

== Premise ==
Ram runs a restaurant in Goa with Anu and Shankranna, where he gets in contact with an undercover ATS officer Bharath Bhargav, who is in lookout for Kalinga, a notorious smuggler running an illegal arms trade with the terrorists. While Bharath begins investigating about Kalinga, he finds that some of the terrorists were targeted and killed by Ram and also learns about Ram's past as Vikram and his true motive. It turns out Ram's Real name is Lt. Commander Vikram Kumar a Special Forces Commando of the Indian Navy also attached to Special Group Force of the Research and Analysis Wing. Lt. Cmdr. Vikram is set on mission both for vengenece from the man who killed his family and is also threat for National Security.

== Cast ==
- Siddharth Mahesh as Ram/ Lt. Cdr Vikram Kumar Indian Navy Marcos Commando
- Srinagara Kitty as ACP Sampath
- Aindrita Ray as Anu
- Ashika Rangnath as Pooja
- Rajesh Nataranga as Bharath Bharghav
- Rangayana Raghu as Shankranna
- Kamna Jetmalani
- P. Ravishankar as Surya Prathap
- Sujay Shastry as Raju
- Adi Lokesh

== Soundtrack ==
The soundtrack album has five singles composed by Raghu Dixit, and released on Raghu Dixit Music.

Garuda (Original Motion Picture Soundtrack)
No.	Title	Singer(s)	Length
1.	"Jaago Re Jaago Re"	Hrithik Siddachar	4:02
2.	"Ee Seethege"	Sruthi V. S, Raghu Dixit
3.	"Kanna Mucchale"	Sruthi V. S, Nakul Abhyankar
4.	"Mad For You Dear"	Aishwarya Rangarajan
5.	"Garuda Theme"	Nakul Abhyankar
Total length:			18:27

== Release ==
Garuda was released on 20 May 2022.

=== Critical response ===
A Sharadhaa from The New Indian Express wrote "Rangayana Raghu too has a significant role to play, but the highlight of Garuda is Srinagar Kitty. His character as a kadak police officer makes a strong presence. Garuda is recommended to those who love to see a mix of action-revenge, love, and family sentiments, and for those who had particularly missed Kitty’s presence on the silver screen". Harish Basavarajaiah of The Times of India gave 3 out of 5 stars and says "Srinagara Kitty gives a solid performance and has a good role after a while. Aindrita Ray and Ashika Ranganath are limited, mostly to songs and a few scenes. Kamna Jethmalani, Rangayana Raghu and Ramesh Bhat have performed well. Adi Lokesh is a tad loud, but effective as the villain. The songs from Raghu Dixit fail to leave a mark. Garuda does touch upon some pertinent issues and could be a one-time watch".

Pratibha Joy of OTTplay gave 3 out of 5 stars and wrote "Garuda is old wine in a new bottle as far as the revenge element of the story goes. Although there is family drama, romance, comedy and action, this one’s for those who like their staple fare of commercial cinema. If that is not your cup of tea, you may not want to invest two-and-a-half hours on this film".
