= Thirumanam Enum Nikkah =

2014 Indian film by Anis

- Poster
- Directed by: Anis
- Written by: Anis
- Produced by: V. Ravichandran
- Starring: Jai; Nazriya Nazim
- Cinematography: Loganathan Srinivasan
- Edited by: M. Kasi Vishwanathan
- Music by: Ghibran
- Production company: Aascar Films
- Release date: 24 July 2014
- Running time: 133 minutes
- Country: India
- Language: Tamil

Thirumanam Ennum Nikkah (transl. Marriage a.k.a. Nikkah) is a 2014 Indian Tamil-language romance film written directed by newcomer Anis and produced by V. Ravichandran of Aascar Films. The film stars Jai and Nazriya Nazim in the lead roles, while Hebah Patel, Jamal, Dinesh Gopalsamy, and Deekshitha Manikkam play supporting roles. The music was composed by Ghibran with cinematography done by Loganathan Srinivasan and editing by Kasi Vishwanath. The film released on 24 July 2014 on the eve of Eid-ul Fitr.

== Plot ==
Vijayraghavachari "Raghava" and Vishnupriya are travelling in the train from Chennai to Coimbatore under the identities Abu Bakar and Aayisha. Raghava acquires the identity of Abu as he gets a ticket reserved in that name, and Vishnupriya acquires the identity of Aayisha as she is impersonating her Muslim friend with the same name for a project. Raghava helps Vishnupriya from a stalker and in course falls in love with her. She too develops feelings for him. Back in Chennai, they start to get to know each other. They assume that the other person is a Muslim, but soon, Vishnupriya feels guilty and asks Raghava to keep away from her. Saddened by this, Raghava meets an Unani doctor named Showkhat Ali and learns about Islam just for Priya's sake. Showkhat's daughter Naseema falls in love with Raghava, assuming him to be Abu. On the day of Ramzan, Vishnupriya confesses her love to Raghava, and they start a relationship. Under certain circumstances, they both come to know about their true identities. Though their family arranges their marriage, they feel that they had true love only for their Muslim counterparts. On the day of their marriage, they break up and move away. Meanwhile, Naseema learns of Raghava's marriage, and her cousin Ashraff plans for revenge. Raghava and Vishnupriya attend Vishnupriya's friend Aayisha's marriage, and they feel that they still had feelings for each other. As Raghava leaves the venue, Ashraff and his friends beat him up. Naseema stops them and confesses that she had been the one who had been at fault rather than Raghava. Vishnupriya notices the brawl, realizes her love, and hugs Raghava. Finally, they both get married.

== Cast ==
- Jai as Vijayraghavan Chari aka Abu Bakar
- Nazriya Nazim as Vishnupriya Iyengar aka Ayesha
- Hebah Patel as Naseema
- Jamal as Showkhat Ali
- Dinesh Gopalsamy as Ashraf
- Deekshitha Manikkam as Aayisha
- Pandiarajan as Roshan Kumar
- Hari Gopinath as Mansoor
- Gadam Kishan as Padmanabha Chari
- Badri Narayanan as Sarangan
- Mayilsamy
- Walter Philips as Madhavan
- Nassar in a cameo appearance

== Production ==
=== Development ===
In February 2012, producer V. Ravichandran of Aascar Films signed debutant Anis to direct a project titled Thirumanam Enum Nikkah with Jai and Samantha being announced as the lead cast. However Samantha's busy schedules led to Nazriya Nazim replacing her in October 2012 to play the lead role. It was Nazriya's first Tamil film she signed though all her other Tamil ventures Neram, Raja Rani, Naiyaandi and Vaayai Moodi Pesavum ended up releasing earlier. It was reported that the film will tell about the romance between two main characters of two different religious backgrounds, with Jai and Nazriya playing IT professionals in the film.

Hebah Patel, who had worked only as a model in commercials, was selected to play the other female lead. Deekshitha Manikkam, runner up of the Miss South India 2013, was signed up to play the pivotal character of Nazriya's friend in the film. Anis' mentor and actor Nassar signed in for a cameo appearance in the film.

=== Filming ===
Principal shooting of the film began in February 2012 in Chennai. The film was subsequently shot in ten-day schedules in periods during October and November. Scenes of actual Hindu and Muslim festivals like Golu at the Sri Adikesava Perumal Temple in Sriperumbudur and Avani Avittam as well as Ramadan in Malabar and Muharram in Hyderabad were captured for the film. The director explained that waiting till the actual ceremonies took place during the year added to the delay in shooting. After completing schedules in Kozhikode and Chennai, the makers headed to Hyderabad for the final schedule of the film, with combination scenes featuring Jai and Nazriya. The shooting of the film was wrapped in July 2013.

== Soundtrack ==
The film's score and six-song soundtrack were composed by Ghibran, with lyrics written by Kadhal Mathi, Munna Shaoukat Ali, Karthik Netha, Parvathy, Thenmozhi and Nizami Brothers. The album was released as a soft launch on 15 December 2013 at Sathyam Cinemas in Chennai with the film's cast and crew being present. Prior to the launch, all the songs in the film were aired on Radio Mirchi as a part of promotional purposes.

== Release ==
The satellite rights of the film were sold to Jaya TV. Producer Ravichandran announced that the film will be scheduled for a theatrical release during April and May 2014. The theatrical trailer of the film was attached with the prints of Vaayai Moodi Pesavum and unveiled on 25 April 2014. During late April, the makers announced that the film will be released on 15 May 2014, a Thursday, instead of a traditional Friday release, due to the 2014 Indian general election results being announced the following day (16 May 2014). However, the film's release was further postponed to 23 May as Ravichandran wanted more time to work on the post-production so as the film will receive a U certificate, making it eligible for exemption from entertainment tax levied by the Tamil Nadu state government. The release was further pushed in order to avoid clash with Rajinikanth's Kochadaiiyaan.

Claiming that the muharram chest-beating procession had been portrayed in a derogatory manner in the film, a Chennai-based organization, Tamil Nadu Shia Muslim Jamath, filed a writ petition on 30 May 2014 in the Madras high court to stall the release of the film. In the petition, the Jamath vice-president Tablez Ali Khan of Thousand Lights said the chest-beating procession is mourning the martyrdom of the grandson of Muhammad, and the occasion is sentimental having religious sanctity. He stated that it was a direct attack on the principles of secularism enshrined in the Constitution. The petitioner wanted the court to direct the complaint and forbear the producers from releasing the film. The case was later withdrawn in June 2014 after Ravichandran's formal meeting with the petitioners.

The film released on 24 July 2014, ahead of the Ramzan weekend. During the release plans, it was rumoured to be clashed with other releases such as Sarabham, Madras, Jigarthanda which pulled away from their initial release schedule.

== Reception ==
The Times of India gave 3 out of 5 stars for the film saying "Thirumanam Enum Nikkah is like the romance dramas in which there will be no story at all if the leads talk to each other in a frank manner and so will have to keep pretending for the plot to go on". In his review for Hindustan Times, Gauthaman Bhaskaran gave 1 out of 5 and wrote "Thirumanam Enum Nikkah has a story and script that seem to have been penned in the most bizarre style. Except for Nazriya Nazim, who is superbly charming as the girl playing both a Muslim and a Hindu, the rest of the cast are no better than caricatures."

Anupama Subramanian of Deccan Chronicle gave 2.5 out of 5 and summarised "Anis's sincere attempt to convey a romantic story laced with inter-religious tension is appreciable, but he has erred in the execution part of it. What starts off with an interesting note, loses its sheen in the middle fizzles out towards the end". She further added "Ghibran's soulful music and brilliant rerecording that is the highlight of the movie". S. Saraswathi of Rediff gave 2 out of 5 saying "the film fails to live up to expectation despite the good performance by both Jai and Nazriya". Baradwaj Rangan in his review for The Hindu stated "Thirumanam Enum Nikkah is infuriatingly bad. We shrug off routinely bad films because there's nothing in them that's good. But films like these, which take on something new and interesting and then botch it up, stick in the craw, like a bad taste you can't wash off."
