= Radio Suno 91.7 =

Radio Suno
- Doha; Qatar

Programming
- Language: Malayalam

Technical information
- Transmitter coordinates: 25.289427°N 51.543426°E

Links
- Website: suno.qa

Radio Suno
- Company type: Private
- Industry: Broadcasting - Radio
- Headquarters: Radio Suno 91.7, Al Ezz tower 3, Al Safiliya Street, Qatar, Doha
- Number of locations: 1
- Key people: Ameer Ali Paruvally; Krishnakumar Aiyappan; Satish G Pillai
- Website: suno.qa

Radio Suno is a Malayalam language radio station in Qatar. The FM station broadcasts 24/7 entertainment, songs and public awareness infedation. Radio Suno launched 87.6 FM in Bahrain. The first 24x7 malayalam radio station in Bahrain website and the technology provided by Mentegoz Technologies

== Information ==
Radio Suno is the first Malayalam FM radio station to be aired from the State of Qatar. The station serves diaspora from the Indian subcontinent. Radio Suno is one with two stations in the Olive Suno Radio Network, along with Radio Olive.

== Programming ==
Radio Suno 91.7 has its own unique program structure across Qatar with station wise programming and which includes regional wise contents and flavours of particular regions.

Programmes
Morning Sawari
Home Delivery
Matinee Mashup
917 Evenings
Suno Melodies
