= Abid Anwar (actor) =

Indian actor

- Born: Abid Anwar
- Occupations: Actor, model, singer
- Years active: 2009–present

Abid is an actor, model and singer who predominantly works in the Malayalam film industry.

== Career ==
Abid was a semi-finalist in the reality show conducted by Jeevan TV in 2009 and an award winner of the Gandarva Sangeetham music reality show conducted by Kairali TV in 2011. He has also acted in over 80 television advertisements. He also acted in character roles in the movies Innanu Aa Kalyanam, Flat No 4B, Kerala Nattilam Pengaludane, etc. He played one of the lead roles in the Indian English-Hindi movie Rani Rani Rani starring Tannishtha Chatterjee, Asif Basra, Alexx O'Nell etc.

== Filmography ==
Year	Title	Role	Notes
2011	Innanu Aa Kalyanam		
2014	Kerala Nattilam Pengaludane	Ameen	
2014	Flat No 4B	Manu	
2024	Rani Rani Rani	Krishna	English-Hindi film
