= Radio Olive 106.3 =

Radio Olive 106.3 FM
- Doha; Qatar
- Frequency: 106.3 MHz

Programming
- Language: Hindi
- Format: All genres

Technical information
- Transmitter coordinates: 25.273880°N 51.481490°E

Links
- Website: olive.qa

Radio Olive
- Company type: Private
- Industry: Broadcasting - Radio
- Headquarters: Radio Olive 106.3, Al Ezz tower 3, Al Safiliya Street, Qatar, Doha
- Number of locations: 1
- Website: olive.qa

Radio Olive 106.3 FM is a Hindi-language FM station to be aired from the State of Qatar. The FM station broadcasts 24/7 entertainment, songs and public awareness information to the diaspora in Qatar.

== Information ==
Radio Olive 106.3 FM has created a milestone in the history of this nation by being the first private Hindi FM station to be aired from the State of Qatar. The FM is part of the Qatar's Radio Network Olive Suno Radio Network. Radio Olive caters to over 11,00,000 Hindi speaking expatriates living in Qatar.

== Promoters ==
- Ameer Ali Paruvally
- Krishnakumar Aiyappan
- Satish G Pillai

== Programming ==
Radio Olive 106.3 FM has a standard program structure across Qatar with station wise programming. The content at each station produced keeping in mind the hyper local flavors of particular regions.

Programmes
Bindass Mornings
Life Mast Hai
Olive Gupshup
Zabardast Evenings
Midnight Lounge
Happy Weekend
Club Olive

== Station locations ==
At present Radio Olive stations are at:

- Qatar Radio Olive 106.3 FM, Al Ezz tower 3, Al Safiliya Street,

Doha
