= Jayaprakash (actor) =

Indian actor and producer (born 1962)

- Born: 14 June 1962 (age 64); Sirkazhi, Tamil Nadu, India
- Occupations: Film actor, film producer
- Years active: 2007–present
- Works: Full list
- Spouse: Zenith
- Children: 2

V. Jayaprakash is an Indian actor and producer who works in Tamil and Telugu films. He ventured into film business in the early 2000s as a producer, making several films under his banner GJ Cinema and later turned actor, with Cheran's 2007 film, Mayakannadi. Subsequently, performing a variety of supporting roles, he found more success as a character actor, with his most notable performances in Pasanga (2009), Naadodigal (2009), Naan Mahaan Alla (2010), Yuddham Sei (2011), Mankatha (2011), Moodar Koodam (2013) and Pannaiyarum Padminiyum (2014).

== Career ==
Jayaprakash hails from Sirkazhi, Tamil Nadu, India. Before entering the film industry, he had worked in various fields such as dairy farming, petrol business, transport and billiards parlour.

He started acting aged 45. His first film was Mayakannadi in 2007, following which he received more acting assignments. His role as the village school teacher, Chokkalingam, in Company Production's critically acclaimed Pasanga is considered his breakthrough performance, for which he received accolades and several awards. Apart from Pasanga, he played notable supporting roles in other commercially successful ventures such as Naadodigal, Vamsam, Naan Mahaan Alla, Bale Pandiya and Yudham Sei and Mankatha. He also appeared in Pandiraj's Marina. He made his Telugu debut with Karthikeya (2014) and appeared in several Telugu films such as Sarrainodu (2016) and Waltair Veerayya (2023).

=== Producer ===
As a producer he has produced several films like Chellamae, April Maadhathil, Thavasi and many more under his GJ Cinema banner. He hasn't starred in any of the film that he had produced. Before starting GJ Cinema banner he produced films like Porkaalam and Gopala Gopala with M. Kajamaideen under Roja Combines. Both GJ cinema and Roja Combines have been closed down for long time.

== Personal life ==
Jayaprakash married to Zenith and has two sons, Niranjan and Dushyanth, who turned actors with the 2010 M. Sasikumar film Eesan.
