= Vaanathaippola =

- Poster
- Directed by: Vikraman
- Written by: Vikraman
- Produced by: V. Ravichandran
- Starring: Vijayakanth; Meena; Prabhu Deva; Livingston
- Cinematography: Arthur A. Wilson
- Edited by: V. Jaishankar
- Music by: S. A. Rajkumar
- Production company: Oscar Films P. Ltd
- Distributed by: Aascar Film Pvt. Ltd
- Release date: 14 January 2000
- Running time: 166 minutes
- Country: India
- Language: Tamil

Vaanathaippola (transl. Like the sky) is a 2000 Indian Tamil-language drama film written and directed by Vikraman. The film stars Vijayakanth in the main dual lead role. The supporting cast includes Meena, Prabhu Deva, Livingston, Kausalya and Anju Aravind. Produced by V. Ravichandran under Oscar Films, the film's music was composed by S. A. Rajkumar and the cinematography handled by Arthur A. Wilson. The film tells the story of a caring brother who makes sacrifices to ensure his three younger brothers succeed in life.

The film opened to positive reviews and commercial success in January 2000, and went on to win the National Film Award for Best Popular Film Providing Wholesome Entertainment the following year. Vaanathaippola subsequently became the most commercially successful film in Tamil, running for over 250 days in theatres. The success of the film led to two Tamil Nadu State Film Awards, as well as several remakes in other Indian regional languages such as Telugu and Kannada. The film was remade in Telugu as Maa Annayya and in Kannada as Yajamana with Rajasekhar and Vishnuvardhan in the titular roles, respectively.

== Plot ==
Vellaichaamy thinks the world of his three brothers to the point of even giving up marriage when he learns that the woman he loves plans to send them to a hostel after the wedding. The brothers live with their grandmother. Vellaichamy works hard to raise them, and they reciprocate his love and affection too. The eldest of the three, Muthu, is a cook in a small hotel. When Vellachamy learns that Muthu is in love with Gowri, he goes to the city to present his marriage proposal to his friend, only to be insulted. Circumstances bring Muthu to the city, where he works as a cook in Gowri's palatial bungalow. Gowri, initially rude towards him, changes her attitude when she learns Muthu had been her childhood playmate, whom she had been very close to. Noticing his humble nature, she falls in love with him. They get married.

Gowri fits right into her new home. Despite coming from a rich family, she helps out with household chores and has no airs about her, a fact appreciated by Vellaichaamy, his grandmother and his brothers. Shanmugam, Muthu's younger brother, who is training to be an inspector, marries Vellaichamy's friend's daughter Sumathi. Initially, she is rude and insulting to Vellaichaamy, but after being confronted by her husband about her behaviour, she breaks down, saying that people around her, including her own father, had believed her to be a harbinger of bad luck, and what her husband had construed to be rudeness was in reality just her attempt to stay out of her in-laws' way to keep them out of trouble. Vellaichaamy comforts her and helps her regain her confidence.

The third and youngest brother, Selvakumar, is a doctor. Selvam has a girlfriend, Nandini, a talkative and vivacious girl. Vellaichaamy approves of her, but she turns out to be the daughter of Vellaichaamy's enemy Dharmalingam, whose sister was Vellaichaamy's ex-lover the woman he had refused to marry. Dharmalingam refuses to get Nandini married to Selvam. However, upon extracting a promise from Vellaichaamy that he would leave the village after the marriage, he gives his consent. Nandini's cousin, who wanted to marry her for the wealth, kidnaps her, but Muthu manages to save her. In the end, the family is reunited by Vellaichaamy's return.

== Cast ==
- Vijayakanth in a dual role as
  - Vellaisaamy
  - Muthu, Vellaisaamy first young brother
- Meena as Gowri, Muthu's wife
- Prabhu Deva as Selvakumar, Vellaisaamy third young brother
- J. Livingston as Inspector Shanmugam, Vellaisaamy second young brother
  - Master Jayanath as young Shanmugam
- Kausalya as Nandhini, Selvakumar's wife
- Senthil as Hotel Owner Manikkavel
- Ramesh Khanna as Pichai
- Anju Aravind as Sumathi, Shanmugam's wife
- Devan as Dharmalingam
- Vineetha as Radha
- S. N. Lakshmi as Maragatham
- Rajeev as Sundaram
- Anandaraj as Rajadurai
- Anand as Anand
- Sabitha Anand as Janaki
- Balu Anand as Ramasamy
- Singamuthu as Singaram
- Kovai Senthil as Beggar
- Kazan Khan as Subramani
- Visweswara Rao

== Production ==
In 1999, Vikraman met Aascar Ravichandran who earlier worked as a distributor for two decades, he was in interested in film production and asked scripts like Poove Unakkaga and Surya Vamsam. Vikraman narrated the script to Ravichandran and he then advised Vikraman to direct this script with Vijayakanth, and had to convince the director to stick with his decision. Ravichandran opted not to attend the sets of the film at any stage of production. He launched a large promotional campaign for the film, prompting attention in the Tamil film industry. Napoleon was approached for the film, but his refusal prompted the team to sign on Livingston.

Initially Shilpa Shetty was finalized for lead heroine role but due to her unavailability Meena was finalized as the lead heroine.

== Soundtrack ==
The soundtrack of the film was composed by S. A. Rajkumar, while lyrics written by Ra. Ravishankar, Pa. Vijay, Viveka and Na. Muthukumar, was well received by the audience. G. Dhananjayan in his book Pride of Tamil Cinema: 1931 to 2013 wrote that the film's success can "also attributed to its superhit songs". The song "Engal Veetil Ella Naalum" is based on "Dil Deewana" from the Hindi film Daag (1999), which itself borrows its charanam from "Pehli Pehli Baar Mohabbat Ki Hai" from Sirf Tum (1999).

Track listing
No.	Title	Lyrics	Singer(s)	Length
1.	"Kadhal Vennila"	Pa. Vijay	Hariharan
2.	"Engal Veetil Ella Naalum"	Na. Muthukumar & Pa. Vijay	S. P. Balasubrahmanyam, Sujatha, Arunmozhi
3.	"Kadhal Vennila"	Pa. Vijay	Jayachandran
4.	"Nathiye Nayil Nathiye"	Pa. Vijay	Sukhwinder Singh, Anuradha Sriram
5.	"Rojappu Maalaiyile"	Pa. Vijay	K. S. Chithra, Mano
6.	"Thavaniye Ennai Mayakiriye"	Viveka	S. P. Balasubrahmanyam, Swarnalatha
7.	"Vaanil Vennila (female version to "Kadhal Vennila")"	Pa. Vijay	Sujatha Mohan
8.	"Mainave Mainave"	Ra. Ravishankar	Unni Menon, K. S. Chithra

== Release and reception ==
The film opened in January 2000 to predominantly positive reviews from critics. The Hindu gave the film a favourable review, remarking that "Vijaykanth excels in comedy and Ramesh Kanna has all the makings of a good comedian", "S. N. Lakshmi as the grandmother is hilarious and adds levity to the film as a whole" and that "Prabhu Deva and Kousalya form an energetic, sprightly pair." The critic also noted that "sentiment and sibling love fail to appeal after a point, when they reach implausible levels". Tamil magazine Ananda Vikatan in its review mentioned "The film highlights the theme of everyone living with unity without any troubles [..] The drawback in this [..] film is there is no villain to the hero character and hence after some time the film struggles to hold attention without any twists". New Straits Times wrote "This movie will appeal to those who love family dramas, especially about brotherly love". Ayyappa Prasad of Screen noted "Vikraman, who is known for his deft screenplay and story line, has once again created a family entertainer which pulls at your heart strings and brings out the best of Vijayakanth in a dual role."

Vaanathaippola subsequently went on to become the most commercially successful Tamil film of the year, running for over 250 days in cinemas. The film secured a hit for the team and prompted Vijayakanth to star in further films. The film went on to win the National Film Award for Best Popular Film Providing Wholesome Entertainment the following year. Furthermore, the success of the film led to two Tamil Nadu State Film Awards, winning Best Film for Ravichandran and Best Director for Vikraman. In 2009, Vikraman and Vijayakanth came back together to make another family drama film titled Mariyadhai, though failed to replicate the success of Vaanathaippola.

== Remakes ==
The film was remade in Telugu as Maa Annayya and in Kannada as Yajamana.

== Bibliography ==
- Dhananjayan, G. (2014). Pride of Tamil Cinema: 1931–2013. Blue Ocean Publishers. OCLC 898765509.
