= Surya Vamsam (1997 film) =

- Poster
- Directed by: Vikraman
- Written by: Vikraman
- Produced by: R. B. Choudary
- Starring: R. Sarathkumar; Devayani
- Cinematography: S. Saravanan
- Edited by: V. Jaishankar
- Music by: S. A. Rajkumar
- Production company: Super Good Films
- Release date: 27 June 1997
- Running time: 156 minutes
- Country: India
- Language: Tamil

Surya Vamsam (transl. Solar dynasty) is a 1997 Indian Tamil-language drama film written and directed by Vikraman. The film stars R. Sarathkumar and Devayani, with Radhika, Manivannan, Priya Raman, Nizhalgal Ravi, Tharini, Ajay Ratnam, Jai Ganesh, Shiva and Anandaraj in supporting roles. It revolves around a traditional father and his son, following their tense relationship, and shows how the strict patriarchy causes a drift between them.

Surya Vamsam was released on 27 June 1997 and emerged as one of the most successful Tamil films of the year. The film won six Tamil Nadu State Film Awards, including Best Film, Best Director (Vikraman) and Best Actress (Devayani), while Sarathkumar won the Filmfare Award for Best Actor – Tamil. It was remade in Telugu as Suryavamsam (1998), in Hindi as Sooryavansham (1999), in Kannada as Suryavamsha (1999) and in Bhojpuri as Dulha Milal Dildar (2005).

== Plot ==
Sakthivel Gounder is a wealthy, influential and highly educated man in his village near Pollachi. He lives with his wife, Latha, three sons and a daughter, but despises his youngest son, Chinnarasu. When Sakthivel's daughter's wedding is arranged, Nandini, the groom's sister, meets Chinnarasu and wonders about their strained relationship. Chinnarasu's sidekick, Rasappa, explains the history to her.

Chinnarasu struggled academically from childhood. He was in love with his relative Gowri, and their elders arranged their marriage. However, Gowri, who is educated, attempts suicide because she believes Chinnarasu's lack of education and literacy makes him an unsuitable match. Chinnarasu saves her and cancels the marriage, but takes the blame upon himself and conceals the truth. Sakthivel, believing that Chinnarasu has disregarded his wishes, becomes angry and stops speaking to him.

Impressed by Chinnarasu's kindness, Nandini develops feelings for him and proposes marriage. Although he initially refuses, he eventually recognises her sincerity and accepts. They register their marriage, angering Sakthivel, who orders them to leave his home. The couple move into a small house on the outskirts, and Chinnarasu finds work with a bus transport company. With help from Nandini's uncle, he buys a bus and establishes his own transport business, which gradually expands and makes him wealthy. Meanwhile, Nandini passes the civil services examination and is appointed Coimbatore district collector.

Sakthivel is astonished by his son and daughter-in-law's success. Later, Gowri's husband suffers heavy business losses and closes his business. Gowri approaches Chinnarasu for a Marketing Manager position at his sugar factory, which he grants her. Sakthivel subsequently meets Chinnarasu's son, Sakthivel Jr., at school and forms a close bond with him. When Chinnarasu learns of this, he is pleased, and Sakthivel realises that he was wrong to misunderstand his son.

Meanwhile, Dharmalingam Gounder, who has a long-standing grudge against Sakthivel after being punished by him for previously misbehaving with a woman, plots to kill him and frame Chinnarasu. He poisons sweets given to Sakthivel by Chinnarasu, but Sakthivel survives after being taken to hospital. Dharmalingam is then beaten by the villagers. In the end, the family reconciles and everyone lives together as a joint family.

== Cast ==
- R. Sarathkumar as Sakthivel Gounder and Chinnarasu Gounder
- Devayani as Nandhini IAS
- Radhika Sarathkumar as Latha Gounder
- Priya Raman as Gowri
- Hemalatha as Shaktivel Gounder Jr.
- Manivannan as Rasappa
- Anandaraj as Dharamalingam
- R. Sundarrajan as Sadhasivam
- Jai Ganesh as Ranganathan
- Sathyapriya as Subbulakshmi
- Nizhalgal Ravi as Thangarasu
- Ajay Rathnam as Rajalingam
- Singamuthu as Sundaram
- Neelu as Doctor
- Ramesh Khanna as Kathiresan
- Sindhu as Shenbagam
- S. N. Vasanth as Chandran
- Siva as Sivakumar
- Kumaresan as Marimuthu
- Tharani as Vasantha
- Sheela Kaur as Vasantha's daughter
- Lavanya as Swapna
- Annuja as Sundari, a bus conductor
- Rajakumaran as bus passenger

== Production ==
The story of Surya Vamsam was written by director Vikraman in 1988 planning to cast actor Vijayakumar and Karthik in lead roles, but after 10 years the film got its venture. In 1996, following the success of Poove Unakkaga, producer R. B. Choudary asked Vikraman to direct once again under his Super Good Films banner. This time Vikraman came with a relationship between elder brother and younger brother which later became Vaanathaippola (2000). After writing the story, he immediately narrated the story to Choudary. He was so inspired by story and he decided to produce the film, but he had put one demand to Vikraman to direct this story with Sarathkumar and give dual role for the character of Vellaichamy and Muthu like twin brothers but Vikraman did not accept to make this character with Sarathkumar because he thought of Janagaraj for Vellaichamy character and Vijay for Muthu character. After many arguments, Vikraman decided to make the film with Sarathkumar with a different story and Choudary did not accept this at first but later he was convinced with half heart to accept Surya Vamsam which Vikraman had scripted. Mahendran was initially approached to play Chinnarasu Gounder's young son; however, Vikraman immediately rejected him citing his arrogant and pompous behaviour. The role eventually went to Hemalatha.

== Soundtrack ==
The soundtrack is composed by S. A. Rajkumar.

Track listing
No.	Title	Lyrics	Singer(s)	Length
1.	"Rosappu Chinna Rosappu" (male)	Ra. Ravishankar	Hariharan	4:12
2.	"Kadhala Kadhala"	Palani Bharathi	Hariharan, Swarnalatha	4:35
3.	"Chalakku Chalakku"	Ra. Ravishankar	Arunmozhi, Sujatha	4:04
4.	"Rosappu Chinna Rosappu" (female)	Ra. Ravishankar	Sujatha	3:58
5.	"Natchathira Jannalil"	Mu. Metha	Mano, Sunandha	4:56
6.	"Thirunalu Thaerazhaga"	Kalaikumar	S. A. Rajkumar, Sujatha	3:21
Total length:				25:06

== Release and reception ==
Surya Vamsam was released on 27 June 1997. Ji of Kalki called it a truly decent, well-structured story with unprompted dialogues while praising the performances of Sarathkumar in dual roles, Devayani and Priyaraman but called the climax as logical loophole and concluded if only the tempo in the second half had been sufficient, there would have been no objection to call it a super good film. K. N. Vijiyan of New Straits Times wrote, "The story seems common enough and not that interesting. But under Vikraman's direction, it has been turned into an entertaining movie".

== Accolades ==
Event	Category	Recipient	Ref.
Filmfare Awards South	Best Actor – Tamil	R. Sarathkumar	
Cinema Express Awards	Best Film – Tamil	Surya Vamsam	
Cinema Express Awards	Best Director – Tamil	Vikraman	
Cinema Express Awards	Best Actor – Tamil	R. Sarathkumar	
Cinema Express Awards	Best Female Playback Singer	Sujatha Mohan	
Cinema Express Awards	Best Music Director – Tamil	S. A. Rajkumar	
Tamil Nadu State Film Awards	Best Film	Surya Vamsam (Note: Shared with Arunachalam.)	
Tamil Nadu State Film Awards	Best Actress	Devayani	
Tamil Nadu State Film Awards	Best Director	Vikraman	
Tamil Nadu State Film Awards	Best Music Director	S. A. Rajkumar	
Tamil Nadu State Film Awards	Best Sound Recordist	Iyappan	
Tamil Nadu State Film Awards	Best Villain	Anandaraj	
Dinakaran Cinema Awards	Best Film	Surya Vamsam	
Dinakaran Cinema Awards	Best Actor	R. Sarathkumar	
Dinakaran Cinema Awards	Best Actress	Devayani	
Screen Awards	Best Director	Vikraman	
Screen Awards	Best Actor	R. Sarathkumar	

== Remakes ==
Surya Vamsam was remade into Telugu as Suryavamsam (1998), in Hindi as Sooryavansham (1999), in Kannada as Suryavamsha (1999) and in Bhojpuri as Dulha Milal Dildar (2005).

== Potential sequel ==
In 2022, Sarathkumar announced a sequel to the project, titled Surya Vamsam 2. In 2023, he reiterated that the project was still in development.

== Bibliography ==
- Dhananjayan, G. (2011). The Best of Tamil Cinema, 1931 to 2010: 1977–2010. Galatta Media. OCLC 733724281.
