= Maa Annayya =

- DVD cover
- Directed by: Ravi Raja Pinisetty
- Screenplay by: Ravi Raja Pinisetty
- Story by: Vikraman
- Based on: Vaanathaippola (Tamil)
- Produced by: Bellamkonda Suresh; Singanamala Ramesh Babu
- Starring: Rajasekhar; Meena; Maheswari; Deepti Bhatnagar; Vineeth; Brahmaji preetha Vijayakumar
- Music by: S. A. Rajkumar
- Production companies: SRS & Sri Ganesh Productions
- Release date: 1 December 2000
- Country: India
- Language: Telugu

Maa Annayya (transl. Our Elder Brother) is a 2000 Indian Telugu-language drama film directed by Ravi Raja Pinisetty. The film stars Rajasekhar and Meena with Maheswari, Vineeth, Brahmaji, Deepti Bhatnagar, Preetha Vijayakumar and Nassar in supporting roles. The film's soundtrack was composed by S. A. Rajkumar. The film was released in 2000 to positive reviews. The film was a remake of the Tamil film Vaanathaippola (2000). The film became a box-office hit.

== Cast ==
- Rajasekhar in a dual role as Madhu and Gopalam
  - Dilip Kumar Salvadi as young Madhu
- Meena as Gowri
  - Sudeepa Pinky as young Gowri
- Maheswari as Nandini
- Vineeth as Sekhar
- Preetha Vijayakumar as Sumathi
- Deepti Bhatnagar as Radha
- Nassar as Nandini's father
- Brahmaji as Gopi
- Devan as Gowri's father
- Sudha as Gowri's mother
- Rama Prabha as Gopalam's grandmother
- Sudhakar as Sonti
- Chandra Mohan as Sumathi's father
- Rami Reddy as rival company owner
- Anand as Anand
- AVS

== Production ==
The film began production in early 2000 with Rajasekhar initially wanting Muthyala Subbaiah to direct the film. According to Subbaiya, he was removed from the film as Rajasekhar was unimpressed with the film Manasunna Maaraju after seeing its rush copy. The film began production under the name Maa Manchi Annayya before the name was shortened to Maa Annayya. Two songs were shot in Austria.

== Soundtrack ==
Soundtrack was composed by S. A. Rajkumar who composed for the original Tamil film. The song "Maa Logililo Pandedantha" is based on "Dil Deewana" from the Hindi film Daag (1999), which itself borrows its charanam from "Pehli Pehli Baar Mohabbat Ki Hai" from Sirf Tum (1999).

No.	Song	Singer
1	"Neeli Ningilo" (Happy)	Hariharan
2	"Maina Emainaave"	K. S. Chithra, P. Unnikrishnan
3	"Maa Logililo Pandedantha"	S. P. Balasubrahmanyam, Unni Menon, K. S. Chithra, Sujatha Mohan
4	"Pilla Bhale Dhini Figure"	S. P. Balasubrahmanyam, Swarnalatha
5	"Kadhile Andhala Nadhi"	Sukhwinder Singh, Anuradha Sriram
6	"Thaajaga Maa Intlo"	K. S. Chithra, Sujatha Mohan, Mano
7	"Neeli Ningilo" (Sad)	Hariharan

== Reception ==
A critic from Full Hyderabad opined that "The film is good to watch with all the fun and laughter". On the contrary, a critic from indiainfo wrote that "There are several occasions where the bond comes under severe test and every time it comes out unscathed". Andhra Today wrote "The story with its heavy brotherly sentiment moves very slow. Unlike other movies, the story does not have any twists and turns of brothers splitting and reuniting. The director has worked hard to make it very appealing to the audience. It offers little entertainment". Telugu Cinema wrote "The routine family drama which could be easily dismissed otherwise has a strength in the form of Rajasekhar in title role who essayed it to its perfection while the junior role has nothing much to offer. [..] Technically, the film has good quality of photography and music by Ram Pinisetty and Rajkumar respectively. As a director Raviraja Pinisetty wasn’t up to the mark in blending the family drama which looks dragging many times".
