= Varapogum Sooriyane =

- Directed by: S. Karuppusamy
- Written by: S. Karuppusamy
- Produced by: C. R. Rajan
- Starring: Trivikram; Priyanjali
- Cinematography: Akilan
- Edited by: Mohan; Subbu
- Music by: Deva
- Production company: Divyashethra Films
- Release date: 5 August 2005
- Running time: 125 minutes
- Country: India
- Language: Tamil

Varapogum Sooriyane (transl. Arrival of new sun) is a 2005 Indian Tamil language drama film directed by S. Karuppusamy. The film stars Trivikram and Priyanjali, with Ahuti Prasad, Ramesh Kanna, Duraipandian, Seetha and Sathyapriya playing supporting roles. The film, produced by C. R. Rajan, was released in 2005.

== Plot ==
The film opens with a village panchayat, the village head disowns his daughter Annapoorni (Seetha) for marrying the illiterate labourer Shanmugam (Ahuti Prasad). After giving birth to her son, Annapoorni dies but not before getting a promise from her husband that he will make their son an educated and respected man.

Many years later, Shanmugam's son Sakthivel (Trivikram) is a bright student who obtains a master's degree with distinction. Shanmugam wants his son to become an IPS officer. Kavitha (Priyanjali), the daughter of the local rich landlord, falls in love with Sakthivel. Kavitha's father (Duraipandian), who wants his daughter to marry an IPS officer, asks Sakthivel to marry his daughter. First reluctant, Sakthivel accepts after the insistence of Shanmugam. Meanwhile, Kavitha's uncle Karuppusamy (Ramesh Kanna), a nothing-for-good, wants to marry Kavitha at any cost. Sakthivel and Kavitha get engaged, and Sakthivel then leaves the village to attend the IPS interview in Delhi. The day of the wedding, Sakthivel returns to the village and announces that he did not attend the interview. Kavitha's father then cancels the wedding and Karuppusamy humiliates Sakthivel and his father in front of the villagers.

Sakthivel explains to his father that he had to perform the last rites of his teacher (Gowthami Vembunathan) who took care of him when he was young. Therefore, he could not make it on time to attend the interview. Sakthivel promises his father and his lover that he will become an IPS officer and he gets a second chance to attend the interview. The day of the interview, Karuppusamy send goons to kill Sakthivel but Sakthivel manages to beat them all. Sakthivel returns to the village in a police uniform after passing the interview. The villagers praise Sakthivel thus making his father proud. Karuppusamy apologizes for his behaviour to Shanmugam and Kavitha's father accepts for the wedding.

== Cast ==
- Trivikram as Sakthivel
- Priyanjali as Kavitha
- Ahuti Prasad as Shanmugam
- Ramesh Kanna as Karuppusamy
- Duraipandian as Kavitha's father
- Seetha as Annapoorni
- Sathyapriya as Karuppusamy's mother
- Sempuli Jagan as Vellaisamy, Karuppusamy's friend
- Kadugu Ramamurthy as Kadugu, Karuppusamy's friend
- Dancer Gopi as Aadu, Karuppusamy's friend
- Devan as Police commissioner
- Nambirajan as Annapoorni's father
- Balu Anand as Balu Anand
- Ajay Rathnam as Officer
- Gowthami Vembunathan as Teacher
- Anjali Devi as Dhanalakshmi, Kavitha's mother
- Chelladurai as Traffic officer
- Bayilvan Ranganathan as Head constable
- Vellai Subbaiah as Priest
- Tirupur Ramasamy as Newspaper delivery employee
- Kovai Senthil as Villager
- Sridhar in a special appearance

== Production ==
S. Karuppusamy, an assistant to K. Bhagyaraj, Vikraman, V. Sekhar and Arjun Sarja, made his directorial debut with Varapogum Sooriyane under the banner of Divyashethra Films. He introduced a new pair: Trivikram and Priyanjali from Telugu cinema for the lead pair. Ahuti Prasad, the Telugu artist was selected to play the role of the hero's father while Seetha played the hero's mother. "The film tells about how a son should respect his father and the way a father should bring up the son", claimed S. Karuppusamy, the director who had also written the story, screenplay and dialogues of the film.

== Soundtrack ==
Varapogum Sooriyane

Soundtrack album by Deva
- Released: 2005
- Recorded: 2005
- Genre: Feature film soundtrack
- Length: 24:27
- Producer: Deva

The film score and the soundtrack were composed by Deva. The soundtrack, released in 2005, features 6 tracks written by P. Vijay, Snehan, Kalai Kumar and Vijayasagar.

Tracklist
No.	Title	Length
1.	"Aaraaro"	4:13
2.	"Koko Kokkara Kozhi"	4:16
3.	"Enn Uthadu Enna"	4:11
4.	"Vellaikaara Vellaikaara"	3:54
5.	"Nongu Vikkura Kannamma"	4:18
6.	"Kattikitta"	3:35
Total length:		24:27

== Reception ==
Sify described the film as "avoidable" and said, "It has clichéd scenes, melodrama, sweat and tears that you may have seen in so many village stories of the '80s. In the presentation, the film is outdated and totally predictable [..] There is nothing really to recommend in this film, even the music of Deva is a big letdown". A reviewer wrote, "Debutants Trivikram and Priyanjali are just ok. Ahudi Prasad, as the poor illiterate father has given a good performance" and added, "the movie lacks pace. Certain melodramatic scenes could have been avoided which would have made the film more presentable". Malini Mannath stated, "the whole set-up coupled with a storyline and a narrative style that would have suited the '60s more, rounding off into an unexciting adventure for the viewers".
