= Vasantam =

2003 film by Vikraman

- Poster
- Directed by: Vikraman
- Written by: Chintapalli Ramana (dialogue)
- Screenplay by: Vikraman
- Story by: Vikraman
- Produced by: N. V. Prasad; Sanam Naga Ashok Kumar
- Starring: Venkatesh; Aarti Agarwal; Kalyani; Akash
- Cinematography: B. Balamurugan
- Edited by: Marthand K. Venkatesh
- Music by: S. A. Rajkumar
- Production company: Sri Sai Deva Productions
- Release date: 11 July 2003
- Running time: 164 minutes
- Country: India
- Language: Telugu
- Box office: ₹20 crore

Vasantam (transl. Spring) is a 2003 Indian Telugu-language drama film written and directed by Vikraman. Produced by N. V. Prasad and Sanam Naga Ashok Kumar, the film starred Venkatesh, Arti Agarwal, and Kalyani. The music was composed by S. A. Rajkumar. The film won two Nandi Awards.

The film opened simultaneously alongside the Tamil version of the film, Priyamaana Thozhi, starring R. Madhavan, Jyothika, Sridevi Vijayakumar and Vineeth. It was remade in Kannada in 2010 as Hoo.

== Plot ==
Ashok and Julie have been friends since childhood. They live in Hyderabad and share no love interest. Ashok marries Nandini, and although Julie's closeness to Ashok initially irritates Nandini, she subsequently accepts it. Julie falls in love with Michael D'Souza, a cricketer who's hoping for a place in the Indian cricket team and whose main rival happens to be Ashok.

When Ashok gets selected instead of Michael, Michael's father strikes a deal with Ashok that the marriage between his son and Julie will only take place if Ashok steps down and lets Michael substitute him, and also tells Ashok to cut his friendship with Julie so he does not interfere in Michael's and Julie's life, to which Ashok agrees. Ashok acts as an unwilling person to his friend Julie. Julie decides to move out of Ashok's house and plans to stay at Michael's. Ashok plans to sell his property, give the money to Julie, and to go to Mumbai with Nandini, where his friend has offered him a job. Ashok and his wife vacate their house without informing Julie. Julie and Michael learn why Ashok is leaving Hyderabad, and they rush to the railway station to stop him but fail to find him. To spot Ashok easily, Julie sings a song to which Ashok responds, and they reunite. Ashok ends up playing for the Indian team and over the time their children become friends too. The film ends on a happy note.

== Cast ==
- Venkatesh as Ashok
- Aarti Agarwal as Nandini "Nandu"
- Kalyani as Julie
- Akash as Michael D'Souza
- Chandra Mohan as Peter, Julie's father
- Sunil as Ramesh
- Tanikella Bharani as Ashok's father
- Hema as Hema
- Ahuti Prasad as Michael's father
- Kondavalasa Lakshmana Rao
- Gundu Hanumantha Rao
- Dharmavarapu Subramanyam
- Pruthvi Raj
- L. B. Sriram
- Prasad Babu
- Surya
- Siva Reddy
- Ananth as Priest
- Vizag Prasad
- Junior Relangi
- Chitti
- Delhi Rajeswari
- Rajasri
- Deepa
- Devisri
- Banda Jyothi
- Master Sajja Tejja as Young Ashok
- Master Shashak
- Baby Akshaya Jayaram
- Baby Srihitha
- V. V. S. Laxman in a special appearance as himself

== Production ==
The film's name is based on Nava Vasantham, the dubbed version of Vikraman's Pudhu Vasantham. Some of the songs were filmed in Greece.

== Soundtrack ==
Vasantam

Film score by S. A. Rajkumar
- Released: 17 June 2003
- Genre: Soundtrack
- Length: 37:16
- Label: Aditya Music
- Producer: S. A. Rajkumar

S. A. Rajkumar chronology
Siva Rama Raju (2002)	Vasantam (2003)	Tiger Harischandra Prasad (2003)

The music was composed by S. A. Rajkumar and released on Aditya Music label. The songs were the same as in Priyaamana Thozhi. The audio release function was held at a set in Ramanaidu Studios on 14 June 2003. In an audio review, Sreya Sunil of Idlebrain.com wrote, "Overall, this album has many melodies but they are all imbued with a déjà vu feeling reminding us of SA Raj Kumar's earlier compositions".

No.	Title	Lyrics	Singer(s)	Length
1.	"Ammo Ammayena"	Kulasekhar	Hariharan, Sujatha	4:47
2.	"Gaali Chirugaali"	Sirivennela Sitarama Sastry	K. S. Chithra	4:34
3.	"Ninnu Chudaka"	Kulasekhar	Hariharan	5:13
4.	"Godaralle Ponge"	Kulasekhar	S. P. Balasubrahmanyam	4:25
5.	"O Lolly Popki"	Chandrabose	Shankar Mahadevan	5:37
6.	"Jampanduve"	Veturi	Udit Narayan, Sujatha	4:58
7.	"O Jabili"	Kulasekhar	K. S. Chithra	5:16
8.	"Ammo Ammayena" (Bit)	Kulasekhar	Hariharan	0:52
9.	"Gaali Chirugaali" (Bit)	Sirivennela Sitarama Sastry	K. S. Chithra	1:28
Total length:				37:16

== Reception ==
Gudipoodi Srihari of The Hindu wrote that "A pleasant film and a sentimental love story, Vasantham tries to establish that there can be genuine friendship between a man and a woman even after their marriages". Jeevi of Idlebrain.com rated the film four out of five.

== Awards ==
- Nandi Special Jury Award for Best Film – N.V.Prasad ( film producer )
- Nandi Award for Best Costume Designer – P.Rambabu
