= Hoo (film) =

- DVD cover
- Directed by: V. Ravichandran
- Written by: Mohan Shankar (dialogues)
- Screenplay by: V. Ravichandran
- Story by: Vikraman
- Based on: Priyamaana Thozhi/Vasantam (2003)
- Produced by: Dinesh Gandhi
- Starring: V. Ravichandran; Meera Jasmine; Namitha
- Cinematography: GSV Seetharam
- Edited by: V. Ravichandran
- Music by: V. Harikrishna
- Distributed by: SS Combines
- Release date: 4 June 2010
- Country: India
- Language: Kannada

Hoo (transl. Flower) is a 2010 Indian Kannada-language film written and directed by V. Ravichandran. The film stars V. Ravichandran and Meera Jasmine in lead roles whereas Namitha plays important supporting role.

The film which is produced by Dinesh Gandhi is a remake of Vikraman's 2003 Tamil/Telugu bilingual Priyamana Thozhi/Vasantham.

== Cast ==
- V. Ravichandran as Anand
- Meera Jasmine as Jasmine
- Namitha as Anju
- Prakash Raj as Michael
- Rangayana Raghu
- Sharan
- Lokanath
- Pavithra Lokesh
- Shankar Ashwath
- Chithra Shenoy

== Soundtrack ==
No.	Title	Lyrics	Singer(s)	Length
1.	"Sarigama Sari"	V. Ravichandran	S. P. Balasubrahmanyam, K. S. Chithra
2.	"O Beautiful Lady"	V. Ravichandran	L. N. Shastry, Suma Shastry
3.	"Nee Hanga Nodabeda"	V. Ravichandran	Srinivas, Anuradha Sriram
4.	"Dheem Dheem"	V. Ravichandran	S. P. Balasubrahmanyam, K. S. Chithra
5.	"Sarigama Sari (child bit)"	V. Ravichandran	Priya Himesh
6.	"Nooku Nuggalu"	V. Ravichandran	Tippu, Anuradha Sriram

== Reception ==
Shruti Indira Lakshminarayana of Rediff scored the film at 2.5 out of 5 stars and says "Harikrishna's composition Sarigama.... will linger on for a while. Other songs picturised on Ravichandran and Namitha will appeal to the masses. There are also chances of a song that is picturised on Pavithra, Namita and the hero, leaving you with discomfort. Hoo is sure to appeal to Ravichandran's fans". A critic from The Times of India wrote "Ravichandran looks dull, jaded and tired. Namitha is just fit to be Bullet Prakash's pair. Meera Jasmine is excellent. Prakash Raj impresses in a brief appearance. Rangayana Raghu shines. Music by V Harikrishna is average. Camera work by G S V Seetharam is mediocre". BSS from Deccan Herald wrote "His abilities are instead limited to some heavy emotional scenes where his woebegone expression adds to the impact. Meera Jasmine is adequate; her expressive eyes and body language bring to life Jasmine effectively. Namitha as Anju, disappoints both critics and the front-benchers. Performance-wise she is restricted in a tiny role while the presentation of her ample assets leaves the seeti-wallahs panting for more".
