= Gokulam =

1993 film by Vikraman

- Theatrical release poster
- Directed by: Vikraman
- Written by: Vikraman
- Produced by: R. B. Choudary
- Starring: Jayaram; Bhanupriya
- Cinematography: M. S. Annadurai
- Edited by: K. Thanikachalam
- Music by: Sirpy
- Production company: J. K. Combines
- Distributed by: Super Good Films
- Release date: 11 June 1993
- Running time: 140 minutes
- Country: India
- Language: Tamil

Gokulam is a 1993 Indian Tamil-language romantic drama film written and directed by Vikraman and produced by R. B. Choudary. The film stars Jayaram (in his major Tamil debut) and Bhanupriya, with Arjun in a special appearance. It was released on 11 June 1993.

== Plot ==
Chellappa lives in a village owning a photo studio along with his friends. Mary comes to the village and rents a house opposite to Kalyan Kumar's house, which is named "Gokulam" and where Kalyan Kumar man lives with his wife and daughter Uma. Kalyan Kumar also has a son named Kannan but has been abandoned by the family members for marrying a girl without the family's consent, but the family regularly receives money orders from Kannan. Although Kannan's father has changed his mind and accepted his son, the latter still does not return home. Everyone in Gokulam thinks that it is only Kannan's wife who does not allow him to reunite with his family.

Mary gets close to Gokulam family members and attends singing classes from Kalyan Kumar. She helps everyone in the family as and when required. Chellappa falls in love with Mary and proposes to her, but Mary tells her flashback to Chellappa, which shocks him. Mary's original name is Gayathri, and she sings well. Gayathri and Kannan love each other. Gayathri is a rich girl but has no parents or relatives except for a guardian who has plans to get his son Vasanth married to her. But Gayathri informs her guardian about her love towards Kannan, for which he agrees immediately. Gayathri feels happy. Kannan requests the wedding to happen after a few days as he has to take care of his poor family. He says that his sister's wedding should happen first. Gayathri agrees for this, and an engagement is planned between them on Gayathri's birthday, but Vasanth gets furious knowing about this and decides to kill Kannan. Vasanth sends a few thugs to kill Kannan. Kannan fights them but gets stabbed at his back. He comes to the function and dies in front of Gayathri.

Gayathri's guardian hands over Vasanth to the police, and Vasanth gets jailed. Gayatri cries and feels bad that Kannan lost his life only because of loving her and decides to help his family. Kannan already informed his family about his love, which they did not agree. Gayathri writes a letter to Kannan's parents that he has married against his their wishes. Gayathri comes to Kannan's village in the name of Mary and sends the money order to Kannan's parents every month in Kannan's name which makes them believe that their son is living in Chennai along with his wife. She also writes letters in Kannan's name to his parents. Chellappa feels proud of Gayathri and promises not to inform anyone about her real identity.

Kannan's sister Uma's wedding is arranged, but Gayathri learns that Uma once had a lover who ditched her and now is blackmailing her about revealing their old photographs taken together to everyone which will impact her marriage. Gayathri decides to help Uma and she goes to the lover's home alone in search of the photographs. She finds the photos and burns them. Suddenly, the man comes and tries to molest Gayathri, but Chellappa rescues her. The crowd gathers around, and the lover lies that Chellappa has an illegitimate relationship with Gayathri, which shocks her. But Gayathri could not reveal her real purpose of visiting his home at night as that would affect Uma's wedding. Finally, Gayathri accepts the blame, and everyone ditches her for her morally incorrect behavior.

The village people ask Gayathri to vacate immediately, but she requests them to allow her to stay for one day so she can attend Uma's wedding and then leave. Despite opposition, Gayathri attends Uma's wedding but is insulted by Kannan's father. A dejected Gayathri leaves the village immediately and has decided to accept a previous offer of going on a world tour, performing stage shows along with her friend.

Chellappa informs Kannan's father about all the truth, and they realize their mistake. The two rush to Gayathri's house, but she has left before that. Finally, the film ends showing Kannan's father waiting in the village railway station every morning for Gayathri's return.

== Cast ==
- Arjun as Kannan (special appearance)
- Jayaram as Chellappa
- Bhanupriya as Mary / Gayathri
- Kalyan Kumar as Kannan's father
- Vadivelu as Raju, Chellappa's friend
- Chinni Jayanth as Chellappa's friend
- Jaishankar as Gayatri's guardian
- Dubbing Janaki as Kannan's mother
- S. N. Vasanth as Vasanth
- Sindhu as Mary
- Yuvasri as Uma
- Raja Ravindra as Uma's former lover
- Major Sundarrajan
- Oru Viral Krishna Rao
- Singamuthu
- Pazhanisamy
- V. S. Gopalakrishnan
- Shanthi Anandraj
- Ramesh Khanna as Ramesh (guest appearance)

== Soundtrack ==
The music was composed by Sirpy, with lyrics by Palani Bharathi.

Song	Singer(s)	Duration
"Chittada Rakkai"	Swarnalatha	4:49
"Nane Madai Mela"	Swarnalatha	4:12
"Puthu Roja Puthiruchu"	Mano, Swarnalatha	3:11
"Antha Vanam"	K. S. Chithra	3:55
"Chevanthi Poo"	Unni Menon, P. Susheela	5:03
"Chinna Chinna Assai"	Sujatha	1:32
"Pon Malayil"	Uma Ramanan	3:12
"Therkke Adikkuthu"	K. S. Chithra	4:45

== Reception ==
Malini Mannath of The Indian Express wrote, "the film has a storyline that could have been made interesting." K. Vijiyan of New Straits Times wrote, "Those who liked Abirami might find [Gokulam] entertaining. The movie would appeal to the whole family". Jayaram won the Cinema Express Award for Best New Face Actor at the 14th Cinema Express Awards.
