= Nageswari =

2001 film by Rama Narayanan

- VCD cover
- Directed by: Rama Narayanan
- Written by: Pugazhmani
- Produced by: N. Radha
- Starring: Ramya Krishnan; Karan; Vadivelu; Vivek
- Cinematography: N. K. Viswanathan
- Edited by: Rajkeerthi
- Music by: S. A. Rajkumar
- Production company: Sri Thenandal Films
- Release date: 14 January 2001
- Country: India
- Language: Tamil

Nageswari (/nɑːɡeɪsvəri/) is a 2001 Indian Tamil-language devotional film written and directed by Rama Narayanan. The film stars Ramya Krishnan in the title role alongside Karan and Vadivelu, while Vivek plays a supporting role. The film, which had music composed by S. A. Rajkumar, was released on 14 January 2001.

== Plot ==
Nagaveni and her brother are great devotees of Nageswari Amman. When a woman sees the devotion Nagaveni has for the deity, she decides to get her wayward son Eashwar married to her. The night before the wedding, Eashwar and his friends, who are drunk, tease and then kill Nagaveni's brother and then her. But she rises from the dead and arrives in time for the wedding. Once inside the house, she torments her husband and his four friends.

== Cast ==
- Ramya Krishnan as Nageswari / Nagaveni
- Karan as Eashwar
- Vadivelu
- Vivek
- Nizhalgal Ravi
- Vennira Aadai Moorthy
- Ajay Rathnam as Devi's husband
- Babloo Prithiveeraj as Anand (or) Narayanan
- Ramesh Khanna as Inbasekhar (or) Appaji
- Riyaz Khan as Ajay
- Kovai Sarala as Manisha Koirala
- Omakuchi Narasimhan
- Mayilsamy
- Master Mahendran as Nanjappa
- Kullamani
- Vellai Subbaiah
- Periya Karuppu Thevar

Uncredited

- Bayilvan Ranganathan
- Lingeswaran

== Soundtrack ==
The music was composed by S. A. Rajkumar.

Song	Singers	Lyrics
"Boom Boom"	Vadivelu, Anuradha Sriram	Kalidasan
"Ennidam Ennidam Vaa"	Febi Mani	Pa. Vijay
"Gopala Yen Akka"	Anuradha Sriram	Kalidasan
"Muthu Muthu"	Vadivelu, Swarnalatha	Muthulingam
"Thullathe Thullathe"	K. S. Chithra	Kalidasan

== Reception ==
Malini Mannath of Chennai Online wrote "Though it is yet another film on the Goddess-protecting-her-devotees kind, it is more of a computer graphics-versus-a coherent story line here. The graphics are thrown in indiscriminately, without proper placement. No serious thought seems to have gone into how, and where it should be placed. So we have graphics – that too of the mediocre variety – intruding almost throughout the narration". S. R. Ashok Kumar of The Hindu wrote, "Dialogue by Pugazhmani is crisp. Produced by N. Radha, the story, screenplay and direction have been taken care of by Ramanarayanan. It is a low budget bhakti sentiment film for women".
