= Mudhal Paadal =

- Directed by: Arul Krishnan
- Written by: Arul Krishnan
- Produced by: S. A. Rajkumar
- Starring: Madhu; Monisri
- Cinematography: Raveendran
- Edited by: Mohanraj
- Music by: S. A. Rajkumar
- Production company: Sree Amman Creations
- Release date: 19 February 1993
- Country: India
- Language: Tamil

Mudhal Paadal (transl. First song) is a 1993 Indian Tamil-language romantic drama film directed by Arul Krishnan and starring newcomers Madhu and Monushri. The film was released on 19 February 1993. The film's soundtrack was composed by S. A. Rajkumar who also produced the film.

== Cast ==
- Madhu as Madhu
- Monushri as the nun
- Jaishankar as Madhu's father
- Bharat Kumar as the nun's brother
- Dasari Narayana Rao as the doctor
- Veeraraghavan as the church priest

== Production ==
This film marks the debut of Madhu and Monushree, the sister of Sonu Walia. S. A. Rajkumar produced the film apart from composing music.

== Soundtrack ==
The music was composed by S. A. Rajkumar who also wrote the lyrics.

Track listing
No.	Title	Lyrics	Singer(s)	Length
1.	"Adho Vannile"		S. P. Balasubrahmanyam	4:37
2.	"Padava Poongkuyile"		S. P. Balasubrahmanyam, K. S. Chitra	4:56
3.	"Poove Idhu Katrin"		K. J. Yesudas, E. S. Murthy	4:11
4.	"Gana Thangame"		Mano, S. A. Rajkumar, Minmini
5.	"Once Upon A Time"	E. S. Murthy	Subha
6.	"Paadava Poonkuyile"		S. P. Balasubrahmanyam, K. S. Chithra
7.	"Oru Murai Nee Kettatha"		P. Jayachandran, K. S. Chithra
8.	"Kuyilgal Paaduthe"		Kousalya, Padma
Total length:				14:27

== Reception ==
A critic from The Indian Express wrote that "the film has a truly revolutionary subject no doubt has been treated rather simplistically. But in the treatment of the rest of the film, the director has shown promise". C. R. K. of Kalki wrote the director picks up very late and starts the story right during the interval and even after that he struggles to move the story and criticised the abundance of songs by Rajkumar. The film failed at the box-office and Rajkumar suffered losses as producer.
