= Krishna Krishna =

2001 film by S. Ve. Shekher

- Directed by: S. Ve. Shekher
- Story by: S. Ve. Shekher
- Starring: S. Ve. Shekher; Sukanya; Vennira Aadai Moorthy; Sriman; Chinni Jayanth; Thyagu; Ramesh Khanna; Manorama; Kovai Sarala; Vichithra; Madhan Bob
- Cinematography: K. S. Selvaraj
- Edited by: B. Lenin; V. T. Vijayan
- Music by: S. A. Rajkumar
- Production company: Media Dreams
- Release date: 8 June 2001
- Running time: 135 minutes
- Country: India
- Language: Tamil

Krishna Krishna is a 2001 Indian Tamil language comedy film directed by S. Ve. Shekher, making his directorial debut. The film stars S. Ve. Shekher and Sukanya, with Vennira Aadai Moorthy, Sriman, Chinni Jayanth, Thyagu, Ramesh Khanna, Manorama, and Kovai Sarala playing supporting roles. The film was released on 8 June 2001. The film was adapted from S. Ve. Shekher's stage drama Adhirshtakaran.

== Plot ==
Gopalakrishnan, a perfect gentleman, wants to get married as soon as possible. His mother, 'Bullet' Pushpa, only wants an extremely wealthy daughter-in-law, so she rejects every marriage proposal. While Bama hates the kind of rich grooms her father brings for her whose only qualification is that they are rich.

One day, Bama, having decided to marry the first bachelor she sees, sees Gopalakrishnan at the bus stop and she falls in love at first sight with him. Finally, after much effort from her end, they fall in love and get married in a police station without their parents' permission.

After the marriage, 'Bullet' Pushpa and Bama often quarrel over small matters. Bama hates lies, she shuns anyone who lies to her four times. Soon, Bama suspects the innocent Gopalakrishnan of having bad habits based on circumstantial evidences. She decides to divorce him. What transpires later forms the crux of the story.

== Cast ==
- S. Ve. Shekher as Gopalakrishnan
- Sukanya as Bhamadevi "Bhama"
- Vennira Aadai Moorthy as Duck Dhakshinamoorthy "Vathumadaiyan", Bhama's father
- Ramesh Khanna as Sivaramakrishnan
- Chinni Jayanth as Krishnamani Raja, an aspiring actor
- Thyagu as a police inspector
- Sriman as Balakrishnan
- Manorama as 'Bullet' Pushpa, Gopalakrishnan's mother
- Kovai Sarala as Kaveri, Sivaramakrishnan's wife
- Vichithra as Rukmani
- Madhan Bob as Singapal Sooranakesari
- Balu Anand as Unnikrishnan
- Pandu as a marriage Broker
- Sindhu as 'Kadala' Kalpana
- K. R. Vatsala as Viswanathan's wife
- M. R. Krishnamurthy as Rukmani's father
- Alex
- Idichapuli Selvaraj as a priest
- Kullamani
- Bayilvan Ranganathan as Gopalakrishnan's father (cameo appearance)
- Visu as Advocate Viswanathan (guest appearance)

== Production ==
Krishna Krishna is adapted from S. Ve. Shekher's play Adhirshtakaran. When Media Dreams approached Sekhar to direct a film for their company, he decided to adapt the play into the film. In order to bring the feel of a feature film, Sekhar wrote seventy nine scenes unlike the play which had only fifteen scenes and increased the length of songs and fight sequences. The film marked the directorial debut of Sekhar. The filming was completed in 30 days.

== Soundtrack ==
Krishna Krishna

Soundtrack album by S. A. Rajkumar
- Released: 2001
- Recorded: 2001
- Genre: Feature film soundtrack
- Length: 21:07
- Producer: S. A. Rajkumar

The film score and the soundtrack were composed by S. A. Rajkumar. The soundtrack, released in 2001, features 5 tracks with lyrics written by Piraisoodan, Kalidasan, Krithaya, Kovi Kovan and the director S. Ve. Shekher.

| Track | Song | Singer(s) | Lyrics | Duration |
|---|---|---|---|---|
| 1 | "Aandavan Namaku" | Harish Raghavendra, Anuradha Shekher | Piraisoodan | 4:54 |
| 2 | "Moodu Vandhachu" | Anuradha Sriram, Krishnaraj | Kovi Kovan | 4:34 |
| 3 | "Naan Orakkannal" | Anuradha Sriram, S. Ve. Shekher | Kirithaya | 3:32 |
| 4 | "Solliyadi Solliyadi" | Mano, Anuradha Shekher | Kalidasan | 4:06 |
| 5 | "Thalli Vechu" | Mano, Swarnalatha, Febi Mani, Sukanya | S. Ve. Shekher | 4:01 |

== Reception ==
Malathi Rangarajan of The Hindu wrote "From the stage version (Adhirshtakaran) to the big screen, Shekher seems to have traversed little. Krishna Krishnaa... provides a few moments that make you laugh aloud, a few that make you smile, and others where a smirk alone suffices". Malini Mannath of Chennai Online wrote, "Since the stage play had come more than a decade back, quite a few of the scenes have already been picturised in some films. This movie is for those who have missed the drama and like to see Shekher in action". Visual Dasan of Kalki wrote the camera angles and backdrops are frequently changed to remind us that this is a stage play and not a movie, but the feeling of watching a comedy drama in SV Shekhar's direction cannot be avoided. Cinesouth wrote "S.V.Sekhar was enthusiastic in making the viewers have a hearty laugh. He has not looked into the quality of the film. In his treatment of the story and his directorial skills, he lags behind by fifteen years!".
