= Unnai Kodu Ennai Tharuven =

- DVD cover
- Directed by: Kavi Kalidas
- Written by: Kavi Kalidas
- Produced by: R. B. Choudary
- Starring: Ajith Kumar; Simran
- Cinematography: Agilan
- Edited by: V. Jaishankar
- Music by: S. A. Rajkumar
- Production company: Super Good Films
- Release date: 26 May 2000
- Running time: 158 minutes
- Country: India
- Language: Tamil

Unnai Kodu Ennai Tharuven (transl. Give me yourself, and I'll give you myself) is a 2000 Indian Tamil-language war film produced by R. B. Choudary of Super Good Films and directed by Kavi Kalidas, in his only directorial credit. The film stars Ajith Kumar and Simran, while Nassar, Raghava Lawrence, Manivannan, and Kitty play supporting roles and Parthiban in a guest appearance. The music was composed by S. A. Rajkumar with cinematography by Agilan and editing by V. Jaishankar. The film was released on 26 May 2000, and failed at the box office.

== Plot ==
Surya has been brought up in the army training barracks in Wellington, Tamil Nadu ever since his mother handed him over as a baby to the camp brigadier. She tells the officer the reason for her action, but the audience is not allowed to hear it at this point. Surya grows up to be a patriotic youth and the best soldier in his class. He is about to complete his training in three months and leave to the border. He falls in love with Indu, the daughter of a senior army officer, who is visiting Wellington Camp. Indu's parents accept her choice of husband, and the family leaves to Kashmir.

Soon after, Indu's father dies in a bomb blast, while her mother loses her life on seeing her husband's body. Not wishing to lose her husband too in war, Indu asks Surya to choose between her and the army. Surya then asks the brigadier to advise him, and the brigadier tells the story of his parents. His father, Bomb Sekhar, was a very violent terrorist who was sentenced to three years in prison and then death. His mother was a nun who visited prisoners and chanted Bible verses to them. Slowly, Sekhar's nature begins to change, and nearing death, he is completely reformed. Sensing that there is no way for him to repent for his mistakes by serving the nation, he confides to the nun that if he had a child, he would have made him act the country.

That night, the nun thinks about her conversation with Sekhar and subsequently resigns her position with the church. The following day, the nun convinces Sekhar that she will bear his child as a way to fulfill his dying wish, and they consummate inside the prison secretly. She leaves him, and the next day, his death sentence is executed. Once Surya is born, she hands him to authorities at the military camp and commits suicide as well. Surya says that his birth was to serve the nation as a soldier, and if she wants to marry him, she must wait for the next 12 years until his service is over. Indu agrees, and Surya moves with his barrack to the border.

== Cast ==
- Ajith Kumar as Surya
- Simran as Indu
- Nassar as Camp Brigadier
- Raghava Lawrence as Ganapathi
- Manivannan as Subramaniyam Singh
- Kitty as Indu's father
- Fathima Babu as Indu's mother
- Charle as Surya's friend
- Chinni Jayanth as James, Surya's friend
- Dhamu as Mustafa, Surya's friend
- Ramesh Khanna as Kannayiram
- Pandu as Selvam
- Babilona as Prostitute

Guest appearances

- Parthiban as Bomb Sekhar, Surya's father
- Sukanya as Surya's mother

== Production ==
The film marked the directorial debut of Kavi Kalidas, who earlier assisted K. Bhagyaraj; it was the only film he had ever directed before his death in 2014. Major Ravi, a former Indian Army officer, played a significant role in assisting the team during scenes featuring Ajith in the army.

== Soundtrack ==
The soundtrack was composed by S. A. Rajkumar.

Track listing
No.	Title	Lyrics	Singer(s)	Length
1.	"Ithayathai Kanavillai"	Ilayakamban	Hariharan	4:48
2.	"Idduppu Selaikkulla"	Pa. Vijay	Shankar Mahadevan, Anuradha Sriram	5:04
3.	"Unnai Kodu Ennai Tharuven"	Pa. Vijay	P. Unnikrishnan, K. S. Chithra	4:24
4.	"Sollu Thalaivaa"	Nandalala	Rajesh Krishnan	5:02
5.	"Pethava Kanniru"	Mayil	Unni Menon	2:37
6.	"Sateliteil Yeri"	Pa. Vijay	P. Unnikrishnan	4:44
Total length:				26:39

== Reception ==
Malathi Rangarajan from The Hindu mentioned that "potholes in the screenplay prove irksome" and that "the thin thread of patriotism woven throughout the film, hardly makes an impact". Tamil Star Online wrote, "In spite of good acting by Ajith, Simran and Parthiban, exotic locales, catchy tunes and impressive choreography [Unnai Kodu Ennai Tharuven] falls way short of expectations. And the blame should fall squarely on the story and script writer Kavi Kalidas". Malini Mannath of Chennai Online ridiculed the film's excessive patriotism, saying, "Everyone is quite happy about doing his/her bit for the country. With such patriotic people around India has nothing to fear. Except, maybe, an increase in its population, including the illegitimate babies".

Dinakaran wrote, "The scenes depicting [Ooty] army training centre have been picturized in a grand style that's brimming with life! Ajith-Simran love scenes have been portrayed with grace and beauty". Indiainfo wrote, "The film has an absurd storyline. The lead pair tries its best to sustain the film. Rajkumar's stale music and an average cinematography only add up to the film's mediocrity. Chowdury of Supergood films has failed to gauge the pulse of the audience this time". However Krishna Chidambaram of Kalki gave a positive review, calling it "a very neat film". The film was commercially unsuccessful, and Ajith mentioned that the since shoot coincided with his marriage preparations, he found it difficult to invest to the project.
