= Priyamaana Thozhi =

- Poster
- Directed by: Vikraman
- Written by: Vikraman
- Produced by: M. Saravanan; M. Balasubramanian; M. S. Guhan
- Starring: Madhavan; Jyothika; Sridevi Vijayakumar; Vineeth
- Cinematography: S. Saravanan
- Edited by: V. Jaishankar
- Music by: S. A. Rajkumar
- Production company: AVM Productions
- Release date: 11 July 2003
- Country: India
- Language: Tamil

Priyamaana Thozhi (transl. Lovable Female Friend) is a 2003 Indian Tamil-language drama film written and directed by Vikraman and produced by AVM Productions. The film stars Madhavan, Jyothika, Sridevi Vijayakumar and Vineeth, with Livingston and Manivannan playing other supporting roles. The film's music is composed by S. A. Rajkumar, while S. Saravanan handled the camera.

Priyamaana Thozhi released simultaneously alongside the Telugu version of the film, Vasantham, on 11 July 2003 to an average response critically and commercially. The movie was remade in Kannada in 2010 as Hoo.

== Plot ==
Ashok and Julie have been friends since childhood. They live in Ooty, Tamil Nadu and share no love interest. Ashok falls in love with Nandini, a rich girl whom he marries, and although Julie's closeness to Ashok initially irritates Nandini, she subsequently accepts it. Julie falls in love with Michael D'Souza, a cricketer who is hoping for a place in the India national cricket team and whose main rival happens to be Ashok.

When Ashok gets selected instead of Michael, Michael's father strikes a deal with Ashok that the marriage between his son and Julie will only take place if Ashok steps down and lets Michael substitute him, and also tells Ashok to cut his friendship with Julie so he does not interfere in Michael's and Julie's life, to which Ashok agrees. Ashok acts as an unwilling person to his friend Julie. Julie decides to move out of Ashok's house and plans to stay at Michael's. Ashok plans to sell his property, give the money to Julie, and go to Mumbai, Maharashtra with Nandini, where his friend has offered to arrange him a job. Ashok and his wife vacate their house without informing Julie. Julie and Michael learn why Ashok is leaving Chennai, and they rush to the railway station to stop him but fail to find him. To spot Ashok easily, Julie sings a song to which Ashok responds, and they reunite. Ashok ends up playing for the Indian team, and over time, their children become friends too. The film ends on a happy note.

== Cast ==
- R. Madhavan as Ashok
- Jyothika as Nandini Ashok
- Sridevi Vijaykumar as Julie
- Vineeth as Michael D'Souza
- Manivannan as Peter, Julie's father
- R. Sundarrajan as Sundarrajan, Ashok's father
- Livingston as Kumar, Ashok's elder brother
- Ramesh Khanna as "Kaka" Ramesh
- Kumaresan as Ashok's friend
- Vijay Babu as Michael's father
- Subhalekha Sudhakar as Nandini's father
- Madhan Bob
- Mohan Sharma as Ashok's interviewer
- Nirosha as Vasanthi, Ashok's sister-in-law
- Y. Vijaya as Nandini's mother
- Tharini as Nandini's elder sister
- Neelu as Vasanthi's father
- Suresh as Ashok's younger brother
- Teja as Young Ashok
- Bharath as Ashok's nephew
- Sweatha Bharathi as Ashok's niece
- Krishnamachari Srikkanth as himself (special appearance)

Uncredited

- Raviraj as Marketing manager
- Muthalvan Saran as a train passenger

== Production ==
AVM Productions had agreed a deal with Vikraman to make a film for them in the 1990s but date clashes meant that they were unable to work together until 2003. After the success of Gemini, AVM Productions approached Vikraman to make a film for them, he expressed interest in making an action film like Gemini however the company felt it won't look good if Vikraman does an action based film hence decided it to be a family drama. Initially titled Inimaiyaana Naatkal before it was retitled, Madhavan signed the film in September 2002, and it became the first time the actor had worked with the producers or the director. Scenes for the film were shot in Ooty, Tamil Nadu with producer Guhan often cooking for the team. The songs were shot abroad, with places filmed where the team filmed including Australia, New Zealand and Switzerland.

The film was also made in Telugu as Vasantam and released on the same date, but with a different cast. Venkatesh, Arthi Agarwal, Kaveri and Jai Akash reprised the roles of Madhavan, Jyothika, Sridevi and Vineeth respectively; while V. V. S. Laxman appeared in the film in a cameo instead of Srikkanth.

== Soundtrack ==
Priyamaana Thozhi

Soundtrack album by S. A. Rajkumar
- Released: 17 June 2003
- Genre: Feature film soundtrack
- Label: AVM Audio

The soundtrack of the film was composed by S. A. Rajkumar. The lyrics for the film were written by Pa. Vijay and Kalaikumar. The song "Maan Kuttiye" was allegedly lifted from Hindi song "Saawan Ka Mahina" from Hindi film Milan (1967). The song "Rojakkale" was reused from Rajkumar's own Kannada song "O Preethiye" which he had composed for Jodi (2001).

Track-list
No.	Title	Lyrics	Singer(s)	Length
1.	"Maan Kuttiye (Duet)"	Pa. Vijay	Hariharan, Sujatha
2.	"Penne Neyum Pennaa"	Pa. Vijay	Unni Menon, Kalpana Raghavendar
3.	"Kattre Poongattre"	Pa. Vijay	K. S. Chithra
4.	"Vaanam Enna Vaanam"	Pa. Vijay	Hariharan
5.	"Maan Kuttiye (Female)"	Pa. Vijay	Sadhana Sargam
6.	"Rojakkale"	Kalaikumar	Mahalakshmi Iyer
7.	"Kattre Poongattre (2)"	Pa. Vijay	K. S. Chithra
8.	"Entha Desathil"	Pa. Vijay	Hariharan

== Reception ==
The film received mixed reviews, with The Hindu's Malathi Rangarajan giving the film an average review concluding that "the dialogue sparkles in many a place, the direction is neat and song sequences have been inserted intelligently — but even with such a youthful team what the film lacks is pep and verve." Another critic noted that the film "has predictable, clichéd situations, stereotyped characters, and lack-lustre treatment. Half-way through the film, you realise which way the script is being steered." Rediff.com noted that " the film lacks the freshness and grandeur of other films", while Sify called it "a highly melodramatic and over-the-top movie with no logic". The critic however noted "If there is something nice about Priyamana Thozhi, it is Sridevi as Julie who looks like a dream, with her controlled and understated performance and steals the show." Visual Dasan of Kalki praised Vikraman for making a film which can be watched with family. New Straits Times wrote "wish Vikram had been as meticulous with the storyline and given us something new and more believable". Indiainfo wrote "This is typical Vikraman's film: neatly packed sentiment film. The thin storyline is laced with good humor and deft screenplay. Unlike his past films, this film is not so great, just a good family entertainer. But its slow pace irks the audience. A few scenes reminds us of Vikraman's earlier film like SOORYA VAMSAM and UNNIDATHIL ENNAI KODUTHEN".

== Box office ==
Priyamaana Thozhi became an average grosser, the first of his career for director Vikraman. He has since struggled to recapture the success that he achieved before this film with his subsequent ventures. Vikraman felt the climax scene was cinematic and since he made the same story in both the languages simultaneously in quick succession he couldn't able to concentrate on the script hence it didn't do well though it did not gave any losses. The film was remade in Kannada as Hoo (2010).
