= Ravanna (film) =

- Theatrical release poster
- Directed by: B. Gopal
- Screenplay by: B. Gopal
- Story by: Posani Krishna Murali
- Produced by: Maganti Gopinath
- Dialogue by: Posani Krishna Murali
- Starring: Krishna; Rajasekhar; Soundarya
- Cinematography: K. Prasad
- Edited by: Kotagiri Venkateswara Rao
- Music by: S. A. Rajkumar
- Production company: RK Films
- Release date: 3 March 2000
- Country: India
- Language: Telugu

Ravanna is a 2000 Indian Telugu-language action film directed by B. Gopal. Krishna, Rajasekhar, and Soundarya played the lead roles. The film was released after a delay to negative reviews.

It was dubbed and released in Hindi as Jaan Ki Baazi 2 by Goldmines Telefilms on 23 January 2020.

== Plot ==
The movie story deals with Ravanna, a wayward youth, is misguided and used by the local MLA to threaten those who oppose his corrupt activities. The arrival of a retired army major and his sister in the village turns things around.

== Cast ==
- Krishna as Major Chowdary
- Rajasekhar as Ravanna
- Soundarya as Panthulamma Sirisha
- Sanghavi
- Narra Venkateswara Rao
- Jaya Prakash Reddy
- Vijayakumar as Chief minister
- M. S. Narayana as Sarpam "Sarpanch" Samara Pulla Reddy
- Venu Madhav
- Kallu Chidambaram

== Production ==
To play the role of an army major, Prakash Raj and a real life Kargil soldier were considered.

== Soundtrack ==
Ravanna

Film score by S. A. Rajkumar
- Released: 1 January 1993
- Length: 20:59
- Label: Aditya Music
- Producer: S. A. Rajkumar

All music is composed by S. A. Rajkumar.

Track list
No.	Title	Lyrics	Singer(s)	Length
1.	"Nuvvante Chala Ishtam"	Sirivennela Seetharama Sastry	Rajesh, K. S. Chithra	4:36
2.	"Okey Oka Asha"	Sirivennela Seetharama Sastry	Udit Narayan, K. S. Chithra	4:01
3.	"Aadi Soma"	Bhuvanachandra	Shankar Mahadevan	3:51
4.	"Mathru Bhoomi"	Veturi	S. P. Balasubrahmanyam	4:16
5.	"Poolakomma"	Sirivennela Seetharama Sastry	Udit Narayan, Sujatha	4:12
Total length:				20:59

== Reception ==
Jeevi of Idlebrain.com rated the film 1 1/2 out of 5 and wrote that "A must watch for Krishna fans for their matinee idol's brilliant performance and strictly recommended for others not to watch". Griddaluru Gopalrao of Zamin Ryot criticised the film's cast and cinematography and some of the dialogues.
