= Cheppave Chirugali =

- DVD cover
- Directed by: Vikraman
- Written by: Vikraman
- Based on: Unnai Ninaithu by Vikraman
- Produced by: Venkata Shyam Prasad
- Starring: Venu Thottempudi; Abhirami; Ashima Bhalla
- Cinematography: K Prasad
- Edited by: Marthand K. Venkatesh
- Music by: S. A. Rajkumar; Sirpy (2 songs)
- Production company: SP Entertainments
- Release date: 24 September 2004
- Country: India
- Language: Telugu

Cheppave Chirugali (transl. Tell my dear mild soothing breeze) is a 2004 Indian Telugu-language romantic drama film directed by Vikraman. The film stars Venu Thottempudi, Abhirami and Ashima Bhalla. It is the Telugu remake of his own 2002 Tamil film Unnai Ninaithu with Ramji, Pandu and Visweswara Rao reprising their roles and Ramesh Khanna in a different role. It was produced by Venkata Shyam Prasad under SP Entertainments. The film's title is based on a song from Okkadu (2003).

== Plot ==
Venu works as a receptionist in a lodge in Vishakapatnam. He, along with his friend Gopi, manages the entire lodge. The lodge is owned by Venu's father but has been leased due to financial troubles. Radha is the daughter of the new manager for the lodge who stays next to the lodge along with her mother and family. Radha gets attracted towards Venu upon seeing his good nature, but Venu tells his past love story to Radha. A few years back, Nirmala lived in the same house where Radha lives now. Venu likes Nirmala and helps her family financially. Slowly, Venu and Nirmala fall in love, and Nirmala's parents decide to get them married. Ramji is Venu's friend who stays with him during his initial days. Later, Ramji secures a good job and starts earning well. Ramji also gets attracted towards Nirmala and tries to impress her. Nirmala's parents consider Ramji to be a better match for Nirmala as he earns more than Venu. They convince Nirmala to marry Ramji. Venu gets heartbroken knowing this, but one day, he finds Ramji in a shopping mall with another girl. Venu understands that Ramji has no intention of marrying Nirmala and is planning only for an illegitimate relationship with her. Venu informs this to Nirmala, who misunderstands that he is trying to break her relationship with Ramji by cooking up false stories. Nirmala, along with her family, moves to a big house given by Ramji. The story comes to the present, and Radha is even more impressed upon listening to Venu's past love story. One day, Venu finds Nirmala and gets to know that Ramji had broken the promise to marry her and humiliated her and her family and they had to leave everything and return to poverty. Venu is worried seeing Nirmala and her family's poor state and again offers help. Nirmala had plans of pursuing MBBS before. Venu helps her for writing the entrance examination. She gets admission only in a private medical college where the fee is high. Venu sells his lodge to the lessee and gives the money to Nirmala to use it as the education fee. Five years pass by, and Nirmala completes her medical degree and gets a job posting, as well. All these years, Venu gave her financial and moral support in pursuing her education. Meanwhile, Radha also remains unmarried as she loves Venu, but she never expressed it to him. Nirmala is about to leave to Hyderabad for a job along with her family. At the railway station, she conveys her interest in marrying Venu, who refuses her proposal by saying that he helped her only because he once loved her and didn't wish to see her in poverty, but did not harbour any feelings for her. He says that he knows that Radha is in love with him and that she has been declining all marriage alliances coming her way for the last five years waiting for Venu. Venu also says that Radha's love is more genuine than Nirmala's because Nirmala ditched him when she found a better guy than Venu, while Radha was rejecting all other proposals for him. Radha overhears the conversation and feels happy. The movie ends with both Venu and Radha getting united.

== Cast ==
- Venu Thottempudi as Venu
- Abhirami as Radha
- Ashima Bhalla as Nirmala
- Giri Babu as Venu's Lodge owner
- Kaikala Satyanarayana as Hotel manager
- Ramji as Ramji
- Sunil as Gopi
- Sudhakar as Chittoor Chinnasubramani Bhagavataru
- Krishna Bhagavaan as Producer's mad son
- L. B. Sriram as Headache-induced man
- Mouli as Nirmala's father
- Ramesh Khanna as Room Boy
- Visweswara Rao
- Master Deepak as Nirmala's brother
- Trinadh
- Sangeeta as Lodge owner's wife
- Subhashini as Nirmala's mother
- Radhika
- Jabardasth Apparao as Telephone booth owner
- Pandu as Gopi's follower
- Kiran Rathod as an item number "Paapa Poothota"

== Music ==
The music of Cheppave Chirugali was composed by S. A. Rajkumar and Sirpy. The audio release function was held on 8 July 2004. All the songs from the original Tamil version Unnai Ninaithu composed by Sirpy were retained in this version.

Song title	Singers	Composer	Duration
"Andaala Devatha"	Hariharan	Sirpy	04:12
"Neeli Neeli Jabili"	Udit Narayan, Shreya Ghoshal	S. A. Rajkumar	04:17
"Nannu Lalinchu" (Duet)	Unni Menon, Sujatha	Sirpy	04:35
"Paapa Poothota"	Hariharan	S. A. Rajkumar	03:55
"Nammaku Nammaku"	Vandemataram Srinivas	S. A. Rajkumar	04:07
"Happy New Year"	Hariharan, Sujatha	S. A. Rajkumar	04:54
"Nannu Lalinchu" (Female)	Sujatha	Sirpy	04:42

== Reception ==
A critic from Idlebrain.com rated the film two out of five stars and wrote that "What this film lacks is soul. The emotions graph is flat".
