= Thodarum =

1999 Indian Tamil-language film

- Poster
- Directed by: Ramesh Khanna
- Screenplay by: Ramesh Khanna
- Story by: S. V. Krishna Reddy
- Based on: Maavichiguru (Telugu)
- Starring: Ajith Kumar; Devayani; Heera
- Cinematography: S. Moorthy
- Edited by: K. Thanigachalam
- Music by: Ilaiyaraaja
- Production company: Sri Devi Movie Makers
- Release date: 14 January 1999
- Country: India
- Language: Tamil

Thodarum (transl. Will continue) is a 1999 Indian Tamil-language drama film directed by Ramesh Khanna (in his directorial debut). starring Ajith Kumar, Devayani and Heera. The supporting cast includes Manivannan, Vadivelu and Gemini Ganesan. It is a remake of the 1996 Telugu film Maavi Chiguru, and was released on 14 January 1999.

== Plot ==
Seetha is a possessive wife who suspects that all the women are throwing themselves at her husband Jayaram's feet. Things get chaotic after Meera enters the picture and ends up hugging Jayaram in front of Seetha. Seetha is diagnosed with a deadly heart condition and decides to have Meera marry her husband for the sake of a good life for Jayaram and their young son. She even goes as far as getting a divorce from Jayaram to make him hate her. In the end, Seetha dies, Jayaram and Meera get married, and they name their baby Seetha.

== Cast ==
- Ajith Kumar as Jayaram
- Devayani as Seetha
- Heera as Meera
- Manivannan
- Vadivelu as "Peon" Mani
- Gemini Ganesan as Seetha's grandfather
- Sowcar Janaki as Seetha's grandmother
- Delhi Ganesh as S. Vinayagam, Seetha's uncle
- Kaka Ravi as Kaka Gopal
- Oru Viral Krishna Rao
- Senthil as Gopi (guest appearance)
- Balu Anand (guest appearance)
- Vichithra as Radha (guest appearance)
- Kumar Natarajan as Vinayagam's friend (uncredited)

== Production ==
Actor Ramesh Khanna made his debut as a director with the film after working as an apprentice to K. S. Ravikumar. Ravikumar was meant to remake the Telugu film Maavichiguru (1996) into Tamil for Sridevi Movie Makers, but his busy schedule meant that he recommended Ramesh Khanna to the producers. The remake was initially titled as Maa Vilakku and was supposed to star Jayaram and Meena, but went through cast changes. Jayaram's falling popularity meant that Ajith Kumar was signed to replace him, while the actor requested a change of lead actress. The film was revived under new title Thodarum with new cast involving Ajith, Heera and Devayani.

== Soundtrack ==
The soundtrack is composed by Ilaiyaraaja. The song "Oru Thulir" is set to the Carnatic raga Keeravani, and "Sernthu Vaazhum" is set to Sindhu Bhairavi.

Song	Singers	Lyrics	Length
"Shock Adikkum"	Hariharan, Gopika Poornima	Palani Bharathi	05:00
"Naanthaan"	Arunmozhi, Gangai Amaran, Malaysia Vasudevan, Sunandha, Devie Neithiyar	Gangai Amaran	07:22
"Oru Thulir"	Bhavatharini, P. Unnikrishnan	Kamakodiyan	05:03
"Yamma Yamma"	K. S. Chithra, S. P. Balasubrahmanyam	Mu. Metha	05:01
"Sernthu Vaazhum"	Ilaiyaraaja	Arivumathi	04:48
"Kanavanukkaga"	S. P. Balasubrahmanyam	Pulamaipithan	05:03

== Release and reception ==
The film released on 14 January 1999. The New Indian Express gave the film a critical review citing that "the director tries hard to avoid small puddles of cliches, but unfortunately falls into an ocean instead" but claims that Devayani gives a "wonderfully controlled performance", while Heera and Ajith are just "adequate". Deccan Herald wrote "Thodarum is a family melodrama, which on its own is not too bad, but [..] it falls completely flat." Dinakaran wrote, "The storyline of the picture starts as a mirthful family comedy. But in the end it turns out to be a harsh affair with such developments like sudden sacrifice and deadly disease and so on". D. S. Ramanujam of The Hindu gave the film a positive review, praising the cast performances, the comedy and cinematography.

== Bibliography ==
- Sundararaman (2007) [2005]. Raga Chintamani: A Guide to Carnatic Ragas Through Tamil Film Music (2nd ed.). Pichhamal Chintamani. OCLC 295034757.
