= Pudhiya Mannargal =

- Theatrical release poster
- Directed by: Vikraman
- Written by: Vikraman
- Produced by: J. Krishti
- Starring: Vikram; Mohini
- Cinematography: S. Saravanan
- Edited by: M. Ganesan
- Music by: A. R. Rahman
- Production company: Paradise Pictures
- Release date: 2 December 1994
- Running time: 137 minutes
- Country: India
- Language: Tamil

Pudhiya Mannargal (transl. New rulers) is a 1994 Indian Tamil-language political thriller film directed by Vikraman with music by A. R. Rahman. The film stars Vikram and Mohini. It did not perform well commercially.

== Plot ==
A group of wayward youth live life aimlessly until they are forced to enter politics to help save the condition of the state they live in and for the betterment of the people around them.

== Cast ==
- Vikram as Satyamoorthy Later CM
- Mohini as Vidhya
- Babu Ganesh as Pandian
- Nalinikanth as Chitti Babu
- Vivek as Araitchi Ariandndham
- Prithiveeraj
- Sriman
- Dhamu as Satyamoorthy's friend
- Soundarya Kumar
- Udhayan (Sakthi Kumar)
- Mahesh
- S. S. Chandran as S. S.
- Vinu Chakravarthy as Tamilmagan
- Delhi Ganesh as Vidhya's Father
- Y. Vijaya as House owner
- Kamala Kamesh
- P. R. Varalakshmi
- Neelu
- Sampath Kumar
- Pasi Narayanan
- Karuppu Subbiah
- Typist Gopu
- LIC Narasimhan
- Manager Cheena
- Perumal
- Tirupur Ramasamy
- Singamuthu as S.S's P.A
- Peter Hein as Henchman (uncredited)

== Production ==
During the making of Pudhiya Mannargal, Vikram was approached by Mani Ratnam to star in Bombay (1995). However, Vikram had grown his hair long and had a beard for Pudhiya Mannargal, and could not change his appearance to accept Ratnam's offer.

== Soundtrack ==
All songs were composed by A. R. Rahman. The song "Nee Kattum Selai" attained popularity.

Track listing
No.	Title	Lyrics	Singers	Length
1.	"Eduda Antha Sooriya"	Palani Bharathi	S. P. Balasubrahmanyam, Minmini, Pallavi	05:00
2.	"Vaanil Yeni"	Palani Bharathi	Mano	04:27
3.	"Nee Kattum Selai"	Palani Bharathi	Sujatha Mohan, T. L. Maharajan	05:26
4.	"Onnu Rendu Moonuda" (not in the film)	Kalidasan	Mano, K. S. Chithra	04:57
5.	"Vaadi Saathukodi"	Palani Bharathi	Kalyani Menon, Sujatha Mohan	04:45
Total length:				24:37

== Reception ==
K. Vijiyan of New Straits Times wrote "Nothing much in this movie but a controversial idea". The film did not perform well commercially, with Sudhish Kamath noting, "The problem with it: the same old cliches of commercial cinema — the film was ridden with stereotypes, predictable incidents triggered by unidimensional screen villains".
