= Naan Pesa Ninaipathellam =

- Poster
- Directed by: Vikraman
- Written by: Vikraman
- Produced by: Pollachi Ashokan
- Starring: Anand Babu; Mohini
- Cinematography: Gopal
- Edited by: K. Thanikachalam
- Music by: Sirpy
- Production company: Vasantham New Creations
- Release date: 9 July 1993
- Running time: 140 minutes
- Country: India
- Language: Tamil

Naan Pesa Ninaipathellam (transl. All that I think of speaking) is a 1993 Indian Tamil language musical drama film directed by Vikraman. The film stars Anand Babu and Mohini. It was released on 9 July 1993.

== Plot ==
Viswanath (Anand Babu) has only a cousin Kaveri (Latha) as family and is very affectionate towards her. He even dropped out of school to pay Kaveri's school fees. Viswanath worked hard for her and begins to sing in the street to support Kaveri.

A few years later, he becomes a singer in a band and organises some stage performance with his friend Govind (Vivek). Unknowingly, Govind and Viswanath pick up a woman called Sandhya (Mohini). She tells that she isn't a singer, she doesn't have family and she has come to find a job in the city. But Sandhya helps Viswanath and Govind in a timely manner by helping them settle their house rent.

Kaveri completes her graduation and becomes a famous newscaster in a TV channel. However, she gets arrogant owing to her fame and she does not want to marry Viswanath as she thinks him to be a mismatch for her due to his poor condition. She challenges Viswanath to become rich.

Viswanath gets an opportunity to perform in a wedding reception. At the marriage reception, Viswanath sees Kaveri as the bride and is shocked knowing that Kaveri ditched him. Viswanath decides to commit suicide but Sandhya saves him and tells her past. Sandhya's father was a rich businessman. Anand (Anand) and Sandhya were in love and they later got engaged. When Sandhya's father's business went bankrupt, Anand refused to marry her. A few days later, her father died because of the shock.

Viswanath and Sandhya challenge to succeed in life. They decide to work hard separately. Sandhya passes civil services exam and she becomes a district collector. Sandhya meets with an accident and is spotted by Anand. Anand takes care of Sandhya in the hospital and he proposes to marry. Sandhya agrees to marry him and they decide to get married.

Viswanath on hearing about Sandhya's wedding plan gets shocked and rushes to the marriage hall but is stopped by the security guards at the entrance. Just before tying the knot, Sandhya cancels the wedding saying that she wanted to teach Anand a lesson by cancelling the wedding at the last moment. Sandhya walks out from the wedding hall and meets Viswanath and praises him as a great human being in front of everyone. She also informs everyone that she loves Viswanath and they get married. After a few years, it is shown that Viswanath becomes a famous singer and gets interviewed by Kaveri, embarrassed, in a TV interview. Viswanath and Sandhya live happily together.

== Cast ==
- Anand Babu as Viswanath alias Viswam
- Mohini as Santhiya alias Vaithuvali
- Vivek as Govindh
- Vizhuthugal Latha as Kaveri
- Anand as Anand
- R. Sundarrajan as Sandhya's father
- Singamuthu as Viswanath's neighbour
- Tinku as Viswanathan (child)
- Sujitha as Kaveri (child)
- Kuladeivam V. R. Rajagopal
- Babloo Prithiveeraj in a guest appearance
- Vinu Chakravarthy in a guest appearance
- Ramesh Khanna in a guest appearance
- Rajakumaran (uncredited role)
- Suresh Chakravarthi in a guest appearance

== Soundtrack ==
The music was composed by Sirpy.

Song	Singer(s)	Lyrics	Duration
"Yalean Kiliyae" (solo)	K. J. Yesudas	Palani Bharathi	4:09
"Yalean Kiliyae" (duet)	Mano, P. Susheela	Palani Bharathi	4:13
"A For Ambika"	Mano, Deepan Chakravarthy, Swarnalatha	Poovarasan	3:51
"Manoduthu Mayiloduthu"	K. S. Chithra	Palani Bharathi	1:36
"Sentamizhil Puthu"	Mano	Pulamaipithan	4:03
"Adi Pulla Alla Marathula"	Mano	Palani Bharathi	1:03
"Kadhal Ennum Puthu Pattu"	Mano, K. S. Chithra	Vikraman	1:24
"Aagaya Gangaye"	K. S. Chithra	Palani Bharathi	3:54
"Poonguyil Ragame" (male)	S. P. Balasubrahmanyam	Palani Bharathi	3:51
"Poonguyil Ragame" (female)	K. S. Chithra	Palani Bharathi	1:48
"Devan Kovil"	Mano	Piraisoodan	4:09

== Reception ==
Malini Mannath of The Indian Express wrote, "Vikraman tried to infuse some freshness in the screenplay and treatment but has succeeded only partly."
