= Ramesh Khanna =

Indian film director and actor

- Born: 30 November 1955 (age 70); Chennai, Tamil Nadu, India
- Occupations: Actor; dialogue writer; film director
- Years active: 1983–present
- Spouse: Shobha
- Children: 2

Ramesh Khanna (also spelt as Ramesh Kanna) is an Indian actor and film director who has worked in Tamil cinema. He has acted in a number of supporting and comedic roles.

== Early life ==
Ramesh Khanna was born on 30 November 1955 in Chennai and the third child of his parents. He acted in R. S. Manohar's drama troupe from the age of 5 as child artist of more than 1000 dramas up to his age of 10 and was appreciated by Sarvepalli Radhakrishnan, President of India at that time.

== Career ==
He became assistant to directors Karaikudi Narayanan, Pandiarajan, Kodi Ramakrishna, Vikraman and K. S. Ravikumar.

Ravikumar was meant to remake the Telugu film Maavichiguru (1996) starring Jagapati Babu and Aamani into Tamil for Sridevi Movie Makers, but his busy schedule meant that he recommended Ramesh Khanna to the producers. The remake was initially titled as Maa Vilakku and was supposed to star Jayaram and Meena, but went through cast changes. The film was revived under new title Thodarum with new cast involving Ajith Kumar, Heera and Devayani. He later started working on a film titled Genius in 2000, but the project eventually was shelved.

Only after, director Vikraman introduced him as a comedy friend to actor Karthik in Unnidathil Ennai Koduthen (1998). From that, he came to limelight with his comic timing.

Khanna has acted in notable comedy roles in films such as Padayappa (1999), Nee Varuvai Ena (1999), Friends (2001), Unnai Ninaithu (2002) and Villain (2002). He has also appeared in supporting roles in films such as Thulluvadho Ilamai (2002).

Ramesh has written dialogues for Muni (2007) and Nam Naadu (2007) and written story of the film Aadhavan (2009).

Ramesh Khanna is seen in a substantial role in the Ajith Kumar starrer Veeram (2014). He is also dialogue writer in Bhaskar Oru Rascal (2018).

== Filmography ==
- Note: all films are in Tamil, unless otherwise noted.

=== As actor ===
==== Tamil films ====
1980s

Year	Film	Role	Notes
1983	Mundhanai Mudichu		
1985	Aan Paavam		
1987	Yetikku Potti	Postman	

1990s

Year	Film	Role	Notes
1992	Abhirami		guest appearance
1993	Gokulam	Ramesh	guest appearance
1993	Naan Pesa Ninaipathellam		guest appearance
1993	Athma		
1995	Muthukulikka Vaariyala		
1995	Muthu		Also assistant director; Uncredited appearance
1996	Avvai Shanmughi		Also assistant director
1997	Dharma Chakkaram	himself	
1997	Pistha	Restaurant guest	Also assistant director; Uncredited appearance in the song "Kozhi Curry Konduvaratta"
1997	Suryavamsam	Kathiresan	
1998	Kondattam	Pazhani	
1998	Kaadhal Mannan	Black Dog security service Inspector	
1998	Thulli Thirintha Kaalam	himself	
1998	Unnidathil Ennai Koduthen	Selvam's friend	
1998	Guru Paarvai	Lingam	
1999	Chinna Raja		
1999	Ullathai Killathe		
1999	Padayappa	Padayappa's friend	
1999	Rojavanam		
1999	Nee Varuvai Ena	Ramesh	
1999	Amarkkalam	Singampuli	
1999	Jodi	Gayathri's brother-in-law	

2000s

Year	Film	Role	Notes
2000	Vaanathaippola	Hotel Servant	
2000	Annai		
2000	Unnai Kodu Ennai Tharuven	Kannayiram	
2000	Appu	Chidambaram	
2000	Vetri Kodi Kattu	Sekar's friend	
2000	Koodi Vazhnthal Kodi Nanmai	Ramesh	
2000	Thenali	Panchabootham's assistant	
2001	Friends	Krishnamoorthy	
2001	Nageswari	Appaji	
2001	Rishi	Cheenu	
2001	Vinnukum Mannukum		
2001	Asathal	Victor	
2001	Krishna Krishna	Sivaramakrishnan	
2001	Kunguma Pottu Gounder		
2001	Star		
2001	Kalakalappu	Sreenivasan	
2002	Pammal K. Sambandam	Sammandham's friend	
2002	Dhaya	Kappi Sekar	
2002	Saptham	Jagir	
2002	Gemini	Professor	
2002	Junior Senior		
2002	Unnai Ninaithu	Krishnamoorthy	
2002	Thulluvadho Ilamai	Mani	
2002	Panchathantiram	Sardarji	
2002	Naina	Pichu	
2002	Villain	Shiva's friend	
2002	I Love You Da	Madhan	
2002	Jaya		
2002	Kadhal Virus	himself	
2003	Aasai Aasaiyai	Vinod's brother	
2003	Kadhaludan	Ramesh	
2003	Military	Ganesan	
2003	Saamy	Inspector Paramasivam	
2003	Indru Mudhal		
2003	Paarai	Barber	
2003	Jayam	a drunkard	
2003	Priyamaana Thozhi	'Kaka' Ramesh	
2003	Anjaneya	Kolair	
2004	Thendral	Sundarakanth	
2004	Arivumani	Peon Thangasamy	
2004	Gajendra	Pazhaniappan	
2004	Attahasam	Surula	
2004	Maha Nadigan		
2005	Girivalam	Gowrishankar	
2005	Priyasakhi	Sakhi's elder brother	
2005	Varapogum Sooriyane	Karuppusamy	
2006	Idhaya Thirudan	Mayilravanan's assistant	
2006	Kodambakkam	Pulikumar	
2006	Aran	a soldier	
2006	Vattaram	Dilli	
2006	Kedi	shop assistant	
2006	Varalaru	Ramesh	
2007	Thiru Ranga	Beeda	
2007	Nam Naadu	Narayanan	
2008	Thodakkam	Rapichai	
2008	Sila Nerangalil	Photographer	
2008	Vambu Sandai		
2008	Ini Varum Kaalam	Saba	
2008	Dasavathaaram	Doctor	
2009	Mariyadhai	Mookaiya	
2009	Aadhavan	Ilayaman	

2010s

Year	Film	Role	Notes
2010	Yathumaagi		
2010	Irumbukkottai Murattu Singam	Jada	
2010	Gowravargal		
2011	Venghai	Thangavelu	
2011	Uyarthiru 420	Uthaman	
2012	Paaraseega Mannan		
2014	Veeram	Subbu collector	
2014	Ninaithathu Yaaro	Uthaman	
2014	Kochadaiiyaan	Nagesh	
2014	Murugaatrupadai	Manda Kashayam	
2016	Uchathula Shiva	Sundar	
2017	Vaigai Express	Ramesh	
2018	Bhaskar Oru Rascal	Devadas	
2018	Saamy 2	Punctuality Paramasivam	

2020s

Year	Film	Role	Notes
2021	Pei Mama		
2021	Obama Ungalukkaaga		
2022	D Block	Watchman Chokkalingam	
2023	Aval Peyar Rajni		
2024	Pambattam	Police officer	
2025	9AM To 9PM Valentines Day		
2025	Konjam Kadhal Konjam Modhal	Karthik's father	
2025	Ambi		
2025	Gandhi Kannadi	Kannamma's boss	Uncredited role

==== Other language films ====
Year	Film	Role	Language	Notes
1994	Captain	Commando	Telugu	
2004	Cheppave Chirugali	Room boy	Telugu	
2005	Sau Jhooth Ek Sach	Saloon customer	Hindi	
2006	Keerthi Chakra	Soldier	Malayalam	
2006	Manasu Palike Mouna Raagam		Telugu	
2013	Policegiri	Wine shop owner	Hindi	
2023	Rajni		Malayalam	Also shot in Tamil

=== As writer and director ===
Year	Film	Credited for	Notes
Year	Film	Writer	Notes
1990	Aarathi Edungadi	Dialogues	
1991	Rasathi Varum Naal	Dialogues	
1991	Vaasalile Oru Vennila	Dialogues	
1993	Mudhal Paadal	Dialogues	
1995	Periya Kudumbam	Dialogues	
1999	Thodarum	Screenplay	Also director
2006	Idhaya Thirudan	Screenplay assistant	Alongside Crazy Mohan and S. Guhan
2007	Muni	Dialogues	
2007	Nam Naadu	Dialogues	
2009	Aadhavan	Story	
2018	Bhaskar Oru Rascal	Dialogues	

=== As dubbing artist ===
- Vaikunthapuram (2020) (Tamil dubbed) for Rajendra Prasad

== Television ==
year	Name	Role	Channel	Note
1994	Top Tucker	—N/a	Sun TV	As director; starring Vivek
2013	Asathal Arangam	Presenter	Captain TV	
2021	Pudhu Pudhu Arthangal	Raghavan	Zee Tamil	
2026-present	Parijatham	Vaidyanathan	Zee Tamil	
2026-present	Bhairavi	Krishnamoorthy	Sun TV	
