= S. Saravanan =

Indian cinematographer

Shanmugam Saravanan
- Born: 15 October 1972 (age 53); Madras (now Chennai), Tamil Nadu, India
- Other name: Saravanan
- Education: M.G.R. Government Film and Television Training Institute, Chennai
- Occupations: Cinematographer; Film director; Screenwriter
- Years active: 1993 – present
- Spouse: Sangita Madhavan Nair (m. 2000)
- Children: 1

Shanmugam Saravanan is an Indian cinematographer and film director who works mainly in the Indian film industry. He is an alumnus of the M.G.R. Government Film and Television Training Institute. He started his career with Poove Unakkaga, a Tamil romantic film starring Vijay and Sangita and was released in the year 1996. He debuted as a director by his directorial venture Silambattam. Saravanan is well known for his association with Directors Vikraman and Suresh Krissna. He has worked as a cinematographer in more than 25 films in Tamil, Telugu, and Malayalam.

== Early life and career ==
The son of poet Ulundurpettai Shanmugham, after completing the Diploma in cinematography from the M.G.R. Government Film and Television Training Institute, Chennai, he assisted senior cinematographer P. Selvakumar in the team of Aabavanan. Later, he made his cinematography debut in the film Amma Ponnu. After watching his work in that film Director Vikraman called and offered him to do cinematography for his next venture titled Pudhiya Mannargal. His work was well appreciated in that movie. He then continued to work with Director Vikraman in the films Poove Unakkaga and Suryavamsam. Both the films were a huge commercial success and was also remade in other Indian Languages.

In 1995, he did a Telugu drama film Stri, directed by K. S. Sethumadhavan. The film has garnered two National Film Awards and also showcased in the Indian Panorama section, International Film Festival of India and 2nd Prague International Film Festival.

He then teamed up with director Suresh Krissna and did films like Aahaa..!, Auto Driver, Sangamam.

In 2008, Saravanan made his directorial debut in the film Silambattam, a Tamil action comedy film. The film starred Silambarasan Rajendar in dual roles while Sneha, Sana Khan, Prabhu and Kishore also play lead roles. Yuvan Shankar Raja composed the film's background score and soundtrack. The film was a huge commercial success. The film released on 19 December 2008.

== Legacy ==
Saravanan has mentored some of the prominent cinematographers in the South Indian film industry, who had all assisted him including Vijay Milton, R. Madhi, Vetri and Manoj Paramahamsa.

== Filmography ==
=== As cinematographer ===
Year	Film	Language
1993	Amma Ponnu	Tamil
1994	Pudhiya Mannargal	Tamil
1995	Stri	Telugu
1996	Poove Unakkaga	Tamil
1996	Selva	Tamil
1997	Suryavamsam	Tamil
1997	Aahaa..!	Tamil
1998	Aahaa..!	Telugu
1998	Auto Driver	Telugu
1998	Oruvan	Tamil
1999	Sangamam	Tamil
2000	Vallarasu	Tamil
2000	Maayi	Tamil
2001	Vaanchinathan	Tamil
2001	Shahjahan	Tamil
2002	Pammal K. Sambandam	Tamil
2003	Priyamana Thozhi	Tamil
2003	Vishnu	Telugu
2004	Madurey	Tamil
2004	Arasatchi	Tamil
2005	Thirupaachi	Tamil
2005	The Tiger	Malayalam
2006	Thirupathi	Tamil
2006	Dharmapuri	Tamil
2006	Smart City	Malayalam
2007	Ali Bhai	Malayalam
2008	Vaitheeswaran	Tamil
2010	Twinkle Twinkle Little Star	Malayalam
2012	The King & the Commissioner	Malayalam
2013	Alex Pandian	Tamil
2017	Pakka	Tamil
2017	Dharmayuddhaya	Sinhala
2026	Varavu	Malayalam

=== As director ===
- Note: all films are in Tamil, unless otherwise noted.

Year	Film	Notes	Ref.
2008	Silambattam		
TBA	Sippai	Unreleased	
