= Tamil Nadu State Film Award for Best Director =

Indian film award

The Tamil Nadu State Film Award for Best Director is given by the state government as part of its annual Tamil Nadu State Film Awards for Tamil (Kollywood) films.

== List of winners ==
Here is a list of the award winners and the films for which they won.

List of winners and nominated work
Year	Recipient	Film
1967	C. N. Shanmugam	Karpooram
1968	Krishnan–Panju	Uyarndha Manithan
1969	P. Neelakantan	Maattukara Velan
1970	P. Madhavan	Nilave Nee Satchi
1971	No award presented	
1972	No award presented	
1973	No award presented	
1974	No award presented	
1975	No award presented	
1976	No award presented	
1977	Bharathiraja	16 Vayathinile
1978	Durai	Oru Veedu Oru Ulagam
1979	S. P. Muthuraman	Aarilirunthu Arubathu Varai
1980	K. Balachander	Varumayin Niram Sivappu
1981	Bharathiraja	Alaigal Oivathillai
1982	Muktha Srinivasan	Pareetchaikku Neramaachu
1983	No award presented	
1984	No award presented	
1985	No award presented	
1986	No award presented	
1987	No award presented	
1988	P. R. Devaraj	Senthoora Poove
1989	K. Balachander	Pudhu Pudhu Arthangal
1990	Vikraman	Pudhu Vasantham
1991	P. Vasu	Chinna Thambi
1992	Mani Ratnam	Roja
1993	S. Shankar	Gentleman
1994	K. S. Ravikumar	Nattamai
1995	Vasanth	Aasai
1996	Agathiyan	Kadhal Kottai
1997	Vikraman Cheran	Suryavamsham; Porkkaalam
1998	R. Parthiban	House Full
1999	Bala	Sethu
2000	Vikraman	Vanathai Pola
2001	Susi Ganesan	Virumbugiren
2002	Mani Ratnam	Kannathil Muthamittal
2003	Karu Pazhaniappan	Parthiban Kanavu
2004	Cheran	Autograph
2005	S. Shankar	Anniyan
2006	Thirumurugan	Em Magan
2007	Thangar Bachan	Pallikoodam
2008	Radha Mohan	Abhiyum Naanum
2009	Vasanthabalan	Angadi Theru
2010	Prabhu Solomon	Mynaa
2011	A. L. Vijay	Deiva Thirumagal
2012	Balaji Sakthivel	Vazhakku Enn 18/9
2013	Ram	Thangameengal
2014	N. Ragavan	Manjapai
2015	Sudha Kongara	Irudhi Suttru
2016	Lokesh Kanagaraj	Maanagaram
2017	Pushkar-Gayathri	Vikram Vedha
2018	Mari Selvaraj	Pariyerum Perumal
2019	R. Parthiban	Oththa Seruppu Size 7
2020	Sudha Kongara	Soorarai Pottru
2021	T. J. Gnanavel	Jai Bhim
2022	Gautham Ramachandran	Gargi

== See also ==
- Cinema of India
