= Silambattam (film) =

- Theatrical release poster
- Directed by: S. Saravanan
- Written by: S. Saravanan
- Produced by: K. Muralidharan; V. Swaminathan; T. S. Rangarajan
- Starring: Silambarasan; Prabhu; Sneha; Sana Khan
- Cinematography: R. Madhi
- Edited by: Don Max
- Music by: Yuvan Shankar Raja
- Production company: Lakshmi Movie Makers
- Release date: 18 December 2008
- Running time: 166 minutes
- Country: India
- Language: Tamil

Silambattam (transl. Stick fighting) is a 2008 Indian Tamil-language written and directed by cinematographer-turned-director S. Saravanan, making his directorial debut. The film stars Silambarasan in a dual role, while Prabhu, Sneha, Sana Khan, Kishore, Santhanam, Nedumudi Venu, and Ponvannan play supporting roles. The music was composed by Yuvan Shankar Raja with cinematography by R. Madhi and editing by Don Max. The film is about a young priest who is forced to reveal his true identity and a secret from his past after an incident happens. The film was released on 18 December 2008.

== Plot ==
Vichu is a mild-mannered temple caretaker who lives with his grandfather in a village. Having been deliberately raised to suppress anger and avoid violence, he leads a quiet life. He is in love with Jaanu, whose playful nature brings joy to his otherwise restrained existence.

One day, Vichu intervenes when a group of men attacks a stranger and successfully drives them away. The incident draws the attention of Muthuvel, a villager who is astonished by Vichu's resemblance to someone from his past. Shortly afterward, Muthuvel is attacked by Duraisingam's men. Vichu rescues him, displaying unexpected fighting skills that shock his grandfather. While recovering in the hospital, Muthuvel reveals the truth about Vichu's family history.

Years earlier, a bitter feud divided the village between Muthuvel's family and the influential Veeraiyan. The conflict began when Veeraiyan attempted to reclaim land he had previously distributed to poor villagers, a move opposed by Muthuvel and his younger brother Tamizharasan. Violence escalated between the two factions, leading to numerous deaths. Before dying from a self-inflicted stab wound, Veeraiyan falsely accused Tamizharasan of murdering him.

Tamizharasan was arrested, but his lover Gayathri testified that he had spent the night with her, proving his innocence. Although he was released, the rivalry continued. Veeraiyan's surviving son, Duraisingam, remained determined to avenge his family. He later attacked Muthuvel's household, killing Tamizharasan and several others. During the massacre, Gayathri escaped and later gave birth to a son, Vichu, before dying. Believing Vichu to be the reincarnation of Tamizharasan, Vichu's grandfather raised him in secrecy and deliberately discouraged any violent tendencies.

After learning the truth, Vichu decides to confront Duraisingam and end the feud. Assisted by Jaanu and his friend Saama, he repeatedly disrupts Duraisingam's plans, including a scheme to establish a beer factory on village land. Vichu's actions gradually turn public opinion against Duraisingam, damaging his influence and personal life.

Seeking revenge, Duraisingam murders Muthuvel in a bomb attack and kidnaps Vichu. He takes him to the same location where Veeraiyan died and prepares to kill him. However, supporters of Tamizharasan arrive and challenge Duraisingam to fight Vichu fairly. Once freed, Vichu overpowers Duraisingam and his men. With the support of the villagers, he finally kills Duraisingam, avenging the deaths of Tamizharasan and his family and bringing an end to the long-standing conflict.

Following the feud's conclusion, Vichu returns to his peaceful life with his grandfather. He marries Jaanu, and the couple later has a son, suggesting that while Vichu has overcome the burdens of the past, the spirited nature of his lineage lives on in the next generation.

== Cast ==
- Silambarasan in a dual role as:
  - Tamizharasan aka Tamizh
  - Vichu
- Prabhu as Muthuvel
- Sneha as Gayathri Tamizharasan
- Sana Khan as Jaanu
- Karunas as Villager
- Santhanam as Saama
- Nedumudi Venu as Gayathri's father and Vichu's maternal grandfather
- Kishore as Duraisingham
  - Rahul as Young Duraisingham
- Ponvannan as Veeraiyan
- Vinayakan as Tamizh's best friend
- Manobala as Jaanu's father
- Nirosha as Jaanu's mother
- Raaghav as Veeraiyan's son
- Yuvarani as Duraisingam's wife
- S. N. Lakshmi as Tamizh and Muthuvel's grandmother
- Pragathi as Muthuvel's wife
- Anu Mohan as Lawyer
- Ilavarasu as Police Officer
- Mayilsamy as Priest
- Crane Manohar as Napoleon
- Sendrayan as Local Rogue
- Lollu Sabha Balaji as Duraisingam's PA
- Apoorva as Prostitute
- V. Swaminathan as Registrar
- Poochi Senthil
- Master Bharath
- Kanal Kannan as Pulippal Boopathy (cameo appearance)
- Premji Amaren as himself
- Antara Biswas as herself
- Rachana Maurya as herself
- Robert (special appearance in the song "Nallamdhana")
- Chaams as Ammanji (uncredited)

== Production ==
Silambattam is the directorial debut of S. Saravanan, previously a cinematographer. The film was launched on 7 December 2007. It was the 25th film for Lakshmi Movie Makers. Sana Khan was introduced as one of the heroines of the project. For a particular sequence, Silambarasan donned the costume of Billa. During the filming for a song sequence at Pollachi, he sprained his ankle, leading to filming being suspended. He was immediately rushed to a local hospital where he was administered treatment and was advised rest for the next few days. Filming was almost complete by September 2008.

== Soundtrack ==
Silambattam

Soundtrack album by Yuvan Shankar Raja
- Released: 21 March 2008
- Genre: Soundtrack
- Length: 27:11
- Label: Sony Music
- Producer: Yuvan Shankar Raja

Yuvan Shankar Raja chronology
Aegan (2008)	Silambattam (2008)	Kunguma Poovum Konjum Puravum (2009)

The music of Silambattam was scored by Yuvan Shankar Raja. The soundtrack album was released on 21 March 2008. Already before the audio launch, three preview songs of the film were released online, "Nallamdhana", "Silambattam" and "Where is the Party". "Vechikkava" is a remix of the same-titled song composed by Ilaiyaraaja for the 1984 film Nallavanukku Nallavan.

After the release, the songs gained much popularity especially among youth, with "Where is the Party" in particular, topping the charts for several weeks. The song and also the album featured in Top 10 lists, too.

Track listing
No.	Title	Lyrics	Singers	Length
1.	"Silambattam"	Vaalee	Shankar Mahadevan	5:08
2.	"Nallamdhana"	Gangai Amaran, Earl, Suzanne D'Mello	Silambarasan, Earl D' Souza, Suzanne D'Mello	6:22
3.	"Machaan Machaan"	Na. Muthukumar	Ilaiyaraaja, Bela Shende	5:30
4.	"Vechukkava"	Gangai Amaran	Silambarasan, Suchitra	4:45
5.	"Where is the Party"	Silambarasan	Mukesh Mohamed, Priyadarshini	5:24
Total length:				27:09

== Release ==
Silambattam was initially scheduled to release in October 2008 during the occasion of Diwali, but got postponed as filming had yet to be completed. It was eventually released on 18 December the same year.

=== Critical reception ===
Sify wrote, "Silambattam is a typical mass masala entertainer. It is another 'Formulaic' film revolving around a larger than life hero, who romances, does comedy". Malathi Rangarajan of The Hindu wrote: "What begins as a fairly suspenseful narrative dwindles into a run-of-the-mill line post-interval. Tales of vendetta have been churned out ever so many times". Pavithra Srinivasan of Rediff.com wrote, "With its humbugging story and bash-fest theme, Silambattam appears to have everything lined up for a B and C Centre win. But if you're a discerning viewer, stay away".

=== Awards ===
Silambattam won in three categories at the Isaiaruvi Tamil Music Awards 2008: Sensational Youth Album, Crazy Song of the Year ("Where is the Party") and Best Remix Song of the Year ("Vechikkava"). Kanal Kannan won the Tamil Nadu State Film Award for Best Stunt Coordinator.
