= S. A. Rajkumar =

Indian film music composer (born 1964)

- Born: 23 August 1964 (age 62); Chennai, Tamil Nadu, India
- Occupation: Music director
- Years active: 1987-2014; 2021
- Award: Kalaimamani Award (1999)

S. A. Rajkumar (born 23 August 1964) is an Indian music composer and lyricist, known for his work primarily in Tamil, Telugu, and Kannada cinema.

== Early life ==
Rajkumar's father was a vocalist performing in stage shows conducted by popular music directors such as Ilayaraja, Gangai Amaren, and Deva. Rajkumar admired his father's musical career and developed an interest in music. It was his mother who encouraged his father to make him join music classes. Rajkumar received classical music training under the guidance of Subbaiah Bhagavathar for 3 years.

== Career ==
After completing his music training, Rajkumar started to organize musical shows on his own and was searching for film opportunities. Come 1987 and director duo Robert–Rajasekar gave him his first breakthrough by signing him as the music composer for their film Chinna Poove Mella Pesu. Since then, Rajkumar has composed music for over 100 Tamil, Malayalam, Telugu and Kannada language films. His compositions for the films such as Pudhu Vasantham (1990), Shruthi (1990), Poove Unakkaga (1996), Surya Vamsam (1997), Aval Varuvala (1998), Unnidathil Ennai Koduthen (1998), Thullatha Manamum Thullum (1999), Raja (1999), Vaanathaippola (2000), Priyamaana Thozhi (2003) and Vasantam (2003) have all been blockbuster musical hits.

== Awards ==
- 1990 – Filmfare Award for Best Music Director – Tamil – Pudhu Vasantham
- 1990 – Filmfare Award for Best Music Director – Kannada – Shruthi
- 1999 – Filmfare Award for Best Music Director – Telugu – Raja
- 1997 – Tamil Nadu State Film Award for Best Music Director – Suryavamsam
- 1999 – Kalaimamani Award

== Discography ==
=== Tamil cinema ===
| Year | Title | Notes |
|---|---|---|
| 1987 | Chinna Poove Mella Pesu | |
| 1987 | Veeran Veluthambi | |
| 1987 | Thangachi | |
| 1988 | Kunguma Kodu | |
| 1988 | Makkal Aanaiyittal | |
| 1988 | Poovum Puyalum | |
| 1988 | Rayilukku Neramachu | |
| 1988 | Manasukkul Mathappu | |
| 1988 | Paravaigal Palavitham | |
| 1989 | En Thangai | |
| 1989 | Oru Ponnu Nenacha | |
| 1989 | Pasakanal | Movie Not Released |
| 1990 | Pudhu Vasantham | Filmfare Award for Best Music Director – Tamil |
| 1990 | Thangathin Thangam | |
| 1990 | Puriyaadha Pudhir | Remake of Tarka (1990) |
| 1990 | Pudhu Pudhu Ragangal | |
| 1990 | Paadi Vaa Thendrale | Movie Not Released |
| 1991 | Perum Pulli | |
| 1991 | Aasai Kiliye Kobama | |
| 1991 | Annan Kaattiya Vazhi | |
| 1991 | Enga Ooru Sippai | |
| 1991 | Nattai Thirudathey | |
| 1991 | Archana IAS | |
| 1991 | Idhaya Oonjal | |
| 1991 | Manasara Vazhthungalen | |
| 1991 | Sivaranjani | |
| 1991 | Nenjamundu Nermaiundu | |
| 1991 | Anbulla Thangachikku | |
| 1991 | Vazhndhal Unnodudhan | Movie Not Released |
| 1992 | Thaali Kattiya Raasa | |
| 1992 | Palaivana Raagangal | |
| 1992 | Ellaichami | |
| 1992 | Mangala Nayagan | |
| 1992 | Pudhu Varusham | |
| 1993 | Mudhal Paadal | |
| 1993 | Konjum Kili | |
| 1993 | Varam Tharum Vadivelan | |
| 1994 | Purushanai Kaikulla Poottukanum | |
| 1994 | Pudhusa Pootha Roosa | |
| 1994 | Chella Kiliye Mella Pesu | Movie Not Released |
| 1994 | Vai Jalaam | Movie Not Released |
| 1995 | Namma Ponnu Vazhanum | Movie Not Released |
| 1995 | Puthu Ponnu | Movie Not Released |
| 1996 | Poove Unakkaga | 50th Film |
| 1996 | Krishna | |
| 1997 | Pistha | |
| 1997 | Suryavamsam | Tamil Nadu State Film Award for Best Music Director |
| 1997 | Nattupura Nayagan | |
| 1997 | Putham Puthu Poove | Movie Not Released |
| 1998 | Maru Malarchi | |
| 1998 | Ponmanam | |
| 1998 | Aval Varuvala | Remake of Pelli (1997); six songs reused from said film. |
| 1998 | Unnidathil Ennai Koduthen | one song "Thottabedda Kulir" is based on "Come Come" from Suswagatham |
| 1998 | Simmarasi | |
| 1998 | Endrum Anandham | Movie Not Released |
| 1999 | Suriya Paarvai | |
| 1999 | Thullatha Manamum Thullum | Reused one song from Suryavamsam (1998) |
| 1999 | Suyamvaram | |
| 1999 | Malabar Police | |
| 1999 | Nee Varuvai Ena | |
| 1999 | Kannupada Poguthaiya | Reused one song from Raja (1999) |
| 1999 | Thirupathi Ezhumalai Venkatesa | |
| 1999 | Paattali | |
| 2000 | Vaanathaippola | Reused one song from Preminche Manasu (1999) |
| 2000 | Sudhandhiram | |
| 2000 | Rajakali Amman | |
| 2000 | James Pandu | |
| 2000 | Kandha Kadamba Kathir Vela | |
| 2000 | Unnai Kodu Ennai Tharuven | Reused one song from Nuvvu Vasthavani (2000) |
| 2000 | Pennin Manathai Thottu | |
| 2000 | Kuberan | |
| 2000 | Simmasanam | |
| 2000 | Maayi | Reused one song from Sneham Kosam (1999) |
| 2000 | Budget Padmanabhan | |
| 2000 | Palayathu Amman | |
| 2000 | Priyamaanavale | Remake of Pavitra Bandham (1996); One song reused from said film. |
| 2000 | Vanna Thamizh Pattu | |
| 2000 | Ennavalle | |
| 2001 | Nageswari | |
| 2001 | Piriyadha Varam Vendum | Remake of Niram (1999) |
| 2001 | Aanandham | |
| 2001 | Krishna Krishna | |
| 2001 | Viswanathan Ramamoorthy | |
| 2002 | Punnagai Desam | |
| 2002 | Shakalaka Baby | |
| 2002 | Kamarasu | "Paathi Nila" is based on "Ye Swapnalokala" from Suswagatham (1998) |
| 2002 | Raja | |
| 2002 | Namma Veetu Kalyanam | |
| 2002 | Padai Veetu Amman | |
| 2003 | Vaseegara | Remake of Nuvvu Naaku Nachav (2001); two songs reused from said film. One song reused from Daddy (2001). |
| 2003 | Kadhaludan | |
| 2003 | Priyamana Thozhi | Reused one song from Jodi (2001) |
| 2003 | Diwan | |
| 2003 | Aalukkoru Aasai | |
| 2004 | Manasthan | |
| 2004 | Chatrapathy | |
| 2005 | Kannadi Pookal | |
| 2005 | Kannamma | |
| 2005 | Plus Kootani | |
| 2006 | Thodamale | |
| 2008 | Valluvan Vasuki | |
| 2010 | Pournami Nagam | Remake of Punnami Naagu (2009); five songs reused from said film. |
| 2013 | Chokkali | |
| 2013 | Thirumathi Thamizh | |
| 2021 | Vaa Pagandaya | |

=== Telugu cinema ===
| Year | Title | Notes |
|---|---|---|
| 1997 | Subhakankshalu | Remake of Poove Unakkaga (1996), three songs reused from said film. |
| 1997 | Pelli | Telugu debut as a solo composer |
| 1998 | Suswagatham | Remake of Love Today (1997); one song reused from Poove Unakkaga (1996). |
| 1998 | Suryavamsam | Remake of Surya Vamsam (1997); five songs reused from said film. |
| 1998 | Raayudu | Remake of Vallal (1997) |
| 1998 | Vaibhavam | |
| 1999 | Sneham Kosam | Remake of Natpukkaga (1998) |
| 1999 | Manavudu Danavudu | |
| 1999 | Manikyam | Remake of Porkkaalam (1997) |
| 1999 | Raja | Remake of Unnidathil Ennai Koduthen (1998); five songs reused from said film. Filmfare Best Music Director Award – Telugu |
| 1999 | Panchadara Chilaka | Remake of Oru Thalai Ragam (1980); one song reused from Ponmanam (1998). |
| 1999 | Preminche Manasu | Remake of Priyamudan (1998) |
| 1999 | Bobbili Vamsam | Remake of Thalaimurai (1998) |
| 2000 | Kalisundam Raa | |
| 2000 | Ravanna | |
| 2000 | Nuvvu Vasthavani | Remake of Thullatha Manamum Thullum (1999); five songs reused from said film. |
| 2000 | Maa Annayya | Remake of Vaanathaippola (2000); six songs reused from said film. |
| 2000 | Pelli Sambandham | Remake of Pooparika Varugirom (1999) |
| 2000 | Ninne Premistha | Remake of Nee Varuvai Ena (1999) five songs reused from said film one song reused from Maayi (2000) |
| 2001 | Chinna | |
| 2001 | Simharasi | Remake of Maayi (2000); three songs reused from said film, two songs reused from Simmarasi (1998), one song reused from Priyamaanavale (2000). |
| 2001 | Eduruleni Manishi | |
| 2001 | Kalisi Naduddam | |
| 2001 | Naa Manasistha Raa | Remake of Parthen Rasithen (2000) all songs reused from said film |
| 2001 | Maa Pelliki Randi | Remake of Unakkaga Ellam Unakkaga (1999) |
| 2001 | Akka Bavekkada | |
| 2001 | Deevinchandi | |
| 2001 | Subhakaryam | |
| 2001 | Ninnu Choodalani | |
| 2001 | Daddy | "Gummadi" is based on "Saamanthi Poovukkum" from unreleased Tamil film Putham Pudhu Poove dubbed in Tamil as Dance Master |
| 2002 | Bharatasimha Reddy | |
| 2002 | Nee Premakai | |
| 2002 | Siva Rama Raju | Remake of Samudhiram (2001) and Simmarasi (1998), one song reused from Samuthiram two songs reused from Simmarasi one song from Surya Vamsam (1997) |
| 2002 | Police Sisters | |
| 2003 | Vasantham | Simultaneously shot with Priyamaana Thozhi (2003) songs reused from said film. |
| 2003 | Tiger Harischandra Prasad | |
| 2004 | Keelu Gurram | one song reused from Priyamanavale |
| 2004 | Kushi Kushiga | Remake of Chronic Bachelor (2003) |
| 2004 | Puttintiki Ra Chelli | |
| 2004 | Cheppave Chirugali | Remake of Unnai Ninaithu (2002); four songs reused from said film. |
| 2004 | Leela Mahal Center | Remake of Amarkkalam (1997) one song reused from Chinna Poove Mella Pesu |
| 2005 | Sankranthi | Remake of Aanandham (2001); Three songs reused from said film, two songs reused from Punnagai Desam |
| 2005 | Naidu LLB | |
| 2006 | Rajababu | Remake of Balettan (2003) |
| 2006 | Andala Ramudu | Remake of Sundara Purushan (1996) |
| 2006 | Astram | Remake of Sarfarosh (1999) |
| 2007 | Veedu Mamoolodu Kadu | |
| 2007 | Nava Vasantham | Remake of Punnagai Desam (2002); three songs reused from said film. |
| 2008 | Gorintaku | Remake of Anna Thangi (2005); three songs reused from said film. |
| 2009 | Punnami Naagu | |
| 2010 | Maa Annayya Bangaram | |
| 2010 | Mouna Raagam | |
| 2011 | Jhalak | |
| 2013 | Mr. Pellikoduku | Remake of Tanu Weds Manu (2011) |

=== Kannada cinema ===
| Year | Title | Notes |
|---|---|---|
| 1990 | Shruthi | Remake of Tamil film Pudhu Vasantham; Only one song reused from said film Filmfare Award for Best Music Director – Kannada |
| 1991 | Gowri Kalyana | Remake of Tamil film Thooral Ninnu Pochchu |
| 1992 | Obbarigintha Obbaru | |
| 1997 | Maduve | Remake of Pelli all songs used from said film |
| 2001 | Jodi | Remake of Darling Darling (2000) one song from this film reused in Priyamana Thozhi |
| 2003 | Chandra Chakori | |
| 2004 | Ramakrishna | Remake of Aan Paavam (1985); reused one song from Kannupada Poguthaiya (1999), reused one song from Nuvvu Vastavani (1999) |
| 2004 | Kanchana Ganga | |
| 2004 | Srusti | Reused one song from Kalisundam Raa and Kadhaludan |
| 2004 | Jyeshta | Remake of Valliettan (2000) |
| 2005 | Gowramma | Remake of Nuvvu Naaku Nachav (2001); reused one song from Leela Mahal Center (2004) |
| 2005 | Love Story | Remake of Maro Charitra (1978); reused one song from Ek Duuje Ke Liye. Dubbed in Tamil as Uyir Ullavarai |
| 2005 | Siri Chandana | |
| 2005 | Varsha | One song reused from Telugu film Suryavamsam |
| 2006 | Sirivantha | |
| 2006 | Thandege Thakka Maga | Remake of Thevar Magan; three songs reused from said film, one song reused from Aanandham |
| 2006 | Sevanthi Sevanthi | |
| 2007 | Thayiya Madilu | |
| 2007 | Preethigaagi | Remake of Aniyathipraavu (1997); reused one song from Kadhalukku Mariyadhai (1997), reused one song from Surya Vamsam (1997), reused one song from Piriyadha Varam Vendum (2001) |
| 2010 | Jokali | |
| 2011 | Mallikarjuna | Remake of Thavasi (2001), reused one song from Priyamaana Thozhi (2003) |
| 2012 | Gokula Krishna | |
| 2014 | Paramashiva | Remake of Samuthiram and Simmarasi; score only |
| 2015 | Katte | Remake of Kedi Billa Killadi Ranga; One song "Sanihake" loosely based on "Oru Thadavai" from Vaseegara |

=== Malayalam cinema ===
| Year | Title | Notes |
|---|---|---|
| 2004 | Vesham | Reused one song from Putham Puthu Poove and Chandra Chakori |
| 2014 | Villali Veeran | |

=== Television ===
- 2010 Kodi Mullai

=== Onscreen appearances ===
- Pudhu Varusham (1992) – guest role in song "Ovvorthanum Kaadhalikkiren"
- Unnidathil Ennai Koduthen (1998) – himself in song "Vaanambadiyin Vaazhvile"
- Endrendrum Kadhal (1999) – himself in song "Nadodi Nanba"
- Ennavalle (2000) – himself
- Priyamanavale (2000) – himself

=== Singer ===
| Year | Movie name | Song | Notes |
|---|---|---|---|
| 1987 | Chinna Poove Mella Pesu | "Ye Pulla Karuppayi" | also wrote lyrics for all songs |
| 1987 | Veeran Veluthambi | Vettaveli | |
| 1988 | Makkal Aanaiyittal | "Dei Dei Payale" | |
| 1988 | Rayilukku Neramachu | Yela Malai Kaatru | |
| 1988 | Manasukkul Mathappu | "Vaa Kanmani" | |
| 1990 | Pudhu Vasantham | "Idhu Mudhan Mudhala | |
| 1996 | Poove Unakkaga | "Oh Pyari" | |
| 1997 | Ee Hrudaya Ninagagi | "Hallo Hallo Beauty" | Kannada song; based on "Oh Pyari" [Composer: V. Manohar] |
| 1997 | Subhakankshalu | "O Pori Panipuri" | Telugu song; based on "Oh Pyari" |
| 1997 | Surya Vamsam | "Thirunalu Thaerazhaga" | |
| 1998 | Suswagatham | "Come Come" | Telugu song |
| 1998 | Maru Malarchi | "Kambanukku Kai Koduthu | |
| 1998 | Ponmanam | "Azhaga Azhaga" | |
| 1999 | Kallazhagar | "Vaararu Vaararu" | Co-singer [Composer: Deva] |
| 1999 | Simmarasi | "Thaaye Thirisooli" | |
| 1999 | Kannupada Poguthaiya | "Elundhal Malapola" | |
| 1999 | Paattali | "Siruvani Oothallo" | |
| 2000 | Vanna Tamizh Pattu | "Kaattu Kuyil Pola" | |
| 2000 | Rajakali Amman | "Santhana Malligaiyil" | |
| 2003 | Chandra Chakori | "Bellama Bellage Daari Bidu" | Kannada song |
| 2003 | Diwan | "Paarthathilla" | |
| 2004 | Puttintiki Ra Chelli | "Anuragham Chese" | Telugu song |
| 2004 | Anbu Sagotharan | "Aagaya Suriyane" | |
| 2005 | Sankranti | "Doli Doli" | Telugu song |
| 2007 | Sevanthi Sevanthi | "Mayadanta Male Bantanna" | Kannada song |
| 2008 | Valluvan Vasuki | "Oothikittathu" | |
| 2009 | Punnami Naagu | "Ajare Ajare" | Telugu songs |
| 2013 | Mr. Pellikoduku | "O Meri Siri" | Telugu songs |
| 2015 | Katte | "Devva Devva" | Kannada song |
| 2021 | Vaa Pagandaya | "Saathi Saathi" | |
