= Pudhu Vasantham =

1990 film by Vikraman

- Poster
- Directed by: Vikraman
- Written by: Vikraman
- Produced by: R. B. Choudary; R. Mohan
- Starring: Murali; Anand Babu; Raja; Charle; Sithara
- Cinematography: A. Haribabu
- Edited by: K. Thanigachalam
- Music by: S. A. Rajkumar
- Production company: Super Good Films
- Release date: 14 April 1990
- Running time: 144 minutes
- Country: India
- Language: Tamil

Pudhu Vasantham (transl. New Spring) is a 1990 Indian Tamil-language musical drama film, written and directed by Vikraman. The film stars Murali, Anand Babu, Raja, Charle and Sithara. It revolves around a woman who, due to circumstances, ends up cohabitating with four men in a platonic friendship.

Pudhu Vasantham is the directorial debut of Vikraman. The film was produced by R. B. Choudary and R. Mohan under Super Good Films. It was released on 14 April 1990, and became major commercial success, running for over 25 weeks in theatres. The film was remade in Kannada as Shruthi the same year, and in Hindi as Baharon Ke Manzil a year later.

== Plot ==
Balu, Michael, Raja, and Manohar are four street musician friends who aim to make it big despite living below the poverty line. Balu sings, Michael dances and plays the tabla, Raja plays the guitar, and Manohar plays the flute. One day, the friends come across Gowri, a seemingly mute girl. They help Gowri find an address she is looking for; however, the person Gowri intended to meet has left for London and will return only after a year. The four pity Gowri as she is helpless and allow her to stay with them.

Friendship blossoms between Gowri and the four men, and she does the household activities while the men seek opportunities to prove their talents. One day, the four men see Gowri negotiating with a vegetable vendor and become furious that Gowri has cheated them by acting mute. Gowri apologizes and tells them her past.

Gowri is a rich girl born and brought up in Ooty. She is the only daughter of a rich estate owner; however, her parents died when she was young, following which Vishwam was appointed as her caretaker. However, Vishwam is greedy and plans to abduct Gowri's wealth. Gowri is in love with her schoolmate Suresh, who hails from Madras.

Suresh plans to leave for London for higher education. Meanwhile, Vishwam comes up with a plan to marry Gowri so he can inherit all her wealth. Gowri retaliates and runs away from Ooty to Madras to meet Suresh. However, Suresh had already left for London before she could find his house.

Gowri says the four men are genuine and she liked their friendship, which made her feel safe, and she pretended to be mute to get their sympathy. The men are convinced and allow her to stay with them until Suresh returns. With the help of her old business acquaintance, Gowri gets an opportunity for the four men to perform at a music competition.

Meanwhile, Suresh returns from London and unites with Gowri. Now, Gowri leaves for Suresh's home. Suresh does not like Gowri befriending the four poor men. He also takes Gowri to a doctor to check her virginity, which shatters her. The four men visit Suresh's home requesting Gowri and Suresh to attend the competition, but Suresh turns them down and insults them. The four devastated men leave.

At the competition, the four men find Gowri seated in the audience, to their surprise. After their performance, they ask about Suresh, and Gowri says she broke with him for not trusting her. The four men win the competition and a chance to compose for a film. Gowri joins their troupe as a singer.

== Cast ==
- Murali as Balu
- Anand Babu as Michael
- Raja as Raja
- Charle as Manohar
- Sithara as Gowri
- Suresh as Suresh
- Vinu Chakravarthy as Balu's father
- Jai Ganesh as Gopikrishnan
- M. R. Krishnamurthy as Srinivasan
- R. P. Viswam as Vishwam
- Kumarimuthu as Kannaiya
- LIC Narasimhan as Rangarajan
- Vijaya Chandrika as Janaki
- Super Good Kannan as Ravi
- Kumaresan as Kumar
- Veeraraghavan as Kesavan
- Sridurga as Balu's mother
- K. S. Ravikumar as the security guard (uncredited)

== Soundtrack ==
The soundtrack were composed by S. A. Rajkumar, with lyrics written by Vaali, Muthulingam and S. A. Rajkumar. The song "Paattu Onnu Paada" is set in Shivaranjani raga.

Song	Singer(s)	Lyrics	Length
"Aayiram Thirunal"	K. S. Chithra, Kalyan	Muthulingam	4:16
"Gowrikku Thirumanam"	S. P. Balasubrahmanyam	Vaali	4:27
"Idhu Mudhal Mudhala"	S. A. Rajkumar	S. A. Rajkumar	4:32
"Pattu Onnu Naan Paadattuma"	K. J. Yesudas	S. A. Rajkumar	4:36
"Pattu Onnu Naan Paadattuma"	P. Susheela, S. P. Balasubrahmanyam	S. A. Rajkumar	3:48
"Podu Thalam"	S. P. Balasubrahmanyam	Muthulingam	4:11
"Vaarungal Vaarungal"	Mano, K. S. Chithra	Vaali	4:18
"Adaludan Padalai Kettu"	P. Susheela, S. P. Balasubrahmanyam	Vaali	2:12

== Release and reception ==
Pudhu Vasantham was released on 14 April 1990, alongside another Murali starrer Silambu. On 28 April 1990, Ananda Vikatan wrote that the friendship between four aspiring musicians and Gowri had been shown in a grand manner without diluting its purity. The reviewer also praised Rajkumar's music, and said the film proved that with a strong script, audiences would be engaged well even if there is no artiste value. On 13 May 1990, P. S. S. of Kalki appreciated the film for portraying the younger generation in a new light. Despite the lack of stars and its director being a newcomer, the film was a major commercial success, running for over 25 weeks in theatres, and was reported by Kavitha Shetty of India Today to be the "biggest success" of 1990.

== Accolades ==
Event	Category	Awardee	Ref.
1990 Tamil Nadu State Film Awards	Best Film	Pudhu Vasantham	
1990 Tamil Nadu State Film Awards	Best Director	Vikraman	
38th Filmfare Awards South	Best Film – Tamil	Pudhu Vasantham	
38th Filmfare Awards South	Best Music Director – Tamil	S. A. Rajkumar	

== Bibliography ==
- Dhananjayan, G. (2011). The Best of Tamil Cinema, 1931 to 2010: 1977–2010. Galatta Media. OCLC 733724281.
