= Mariyadhai =

- Theatrical release poster
- Directed by: Vikraman
- Written by: Vikraman
- Produced by: T. Siva
- Starring: Vijayakanth; Meena; Meera Jasmine; Ambika
- Cinematography: I. Andrew
- Edited by: Suresh Urs
- Music by: Vijay Antony
- Production companies: Raj Television Network; Amma Creations
- Release date: 24 April 2009
- Running time: 130 minutes
- Country: India
- Language: Tamil

Mariyadhai (transl. Respect) is a 2009 Indian Tamil-language drama film directed by Vikraman. The film stars Vijayakanth in a dual role as father and son alongside Meena and Meera Jasmine while Ambika also plays a significant role. The film was released on 24 April 2009 to mixed reviews.

== Plot ==
Father Annamalai and son Raja aka Pichai (both played by Vijayakanth), mother (Ambika), a pretty sister and a rather chubby Chandra (Meera Jasmine), a radio jockey who arrives to stay with them because her parents have left for the US.

In the midst of all this, Chandra falls in love with Raja, a dutiful son who has been brought up differently by his father but he does not return her love. He's too busy running his tractor and earning money. A flashback tells us that Raja was once in love with Radha (Meena, in a delightful role) but it went sour.

== Cast ==
- Vijayakanth as Annamalai and Picchai (Raja) - Dual Roles
- Meena as Radha
- Meera Jasmine as Chandra
- Ambika as Alamelu
- Ammu Ramachandran as Sumathy
- Ramesh Khanna as Mookaiya
- Shanmugarajan as Marthandam
- Sampath Raj as Sampath
- Hariraj as Land buyer
- Nassar as Solaiyu Muthurajah
- Thalaivasal Vijay as Muthaiyya
- Nizhalgal Ravi as Viswanathan
- Ramji as Selvam
- Kuyili as Radha's mother
- Meera Krishnan as Viswanathan's wife
- Santhoshi as Presenter
- Bava Lakshmanan as Astrologer
- Cool Suresh as Waiter
- Meesai Rajendranath
- Subhalekha Sudhakar as Radha's father (uncredited)
- Imman Annachi as Marthandam's supporter (uncredited)

== Soundtrack ==
The music was composed by Vijay Antony.

Song	Singers	Lyrics	Length
"Adada Adada"	Vinaya	Kalaikumar	04:14
"Devathai Desathil"	Hariharan, Shreya Ghoshal	Pa. Vijay	04:08
"Inbamay"	Udit Narayan, Mahathi	Pulamaipithan	03:56
"Unnai Ninaithen"	V. V. Prasanna, Shreya Ghoshal	Pa. Vijay	04:29
"Yaar Paarthathu" I	Vinaya, Hariharan	Na. Muthukumar	03:18
"Yaar Paarthathu" II	Unni Menon	Na. Muthukumar	03:00

== Critical reception ==
Rediff.com wrote that "Mariyadhai is full of stock situations and trite dialogues but can satisfy Vijayakanth's fans". The Hindu wrote, "Director Vikraman deserves to be lauded for making a Vijayakanth film with no political innuendos, and without deifying the hero". Chennai Online wrote, "Overall, Vikraman has chosen a boring subject and told it with a pathetic script. The movie is so dull that it would be a futile and painful exercise to go in to detail".
