= Abhirami (1992 film) =

- Theatrical release poster
- Directed by: Dilip Kumar
- Written by: Dilip Kumar
- Produced by: R. B. Choudary
- Starring: Saravanan; Sujatha; Kasthuri
- Cinematography: K. Ramsingh
- Edited by: B. Baskaren
- Music by: Mano Ranjan
- Production company: Super Good Films
- Release date: 27 November 1992
- Running time: 145 minutes
- Country: India
- Language: Tamil

Abhirami is a 1992 Indian Tamil-language drama film, directed by Dilip Kumar in his directorial debut and produced by R. B. Choudary. The film stars Saravanan, Sujatha, and Kasthuri, with the supporting cast including Anju, Vinodhini, Rohini, Goundamani, and Senthil. It was released on 27 November 1992.

== Plot ==
Abhirami has five daughters, including Dhanam, Rajeshwari, and Maheshwari. The eldest Dhanam is a soft-spoken woman who worked as typist, while Rajeshwari is a short-tempered woman, Maheshwari is a carefree teenager, and the last two are little girls.

Saravanan is an orphan and a jobless youth who is in love with Dhanam. He lives in a small hotel with his new friend Ramkanth. Saravanan finally finds a decent job in a clothing store. He then moves with his friend Ramkanth near Dhanam's house. Saravanan slowly becomes one of their well-wishers but Saravanan learns that Dhanam will get married soon to someone else. The heartbroken Saravanan doesn't reveal his love and vacates the house.

On the wedding day, Abhirami has an accident and their jewels get stolen. Saravanan rushes Abhirami to the hospital, and then takes jewels from his boss' daughter Vasanthi who is a widow. Afterwards, the wedding takes place. After the wedding, Saravanan reveals that Abhirami had died on the way to the hospital. Saravanan doesn't tell the truth for fear that the wedding would stop.

Now, the remaining four girls accept Saravanan as their brother and he decides to live with them. Saravanan and Vasanthi get married soon after.

== Cast ==
- Saravanan as Saravanan
- Sujatha as Abhirami
- Kasthuri as Dhanam
- Anju as Rajeshwari
- Vinodhini as Maheshwari
- Rohini as Vasanthi
- Goundamani as Singaram
- Senthil as Ramkanth (Ramasamy)
- Vadivukkarasi as Lakshmi
- C. R. Saraswathi as Saroja
- Vijaya Chandrika
- Shanmugasundari
- Indira Devi
- Ra. Sankaran
- Kumarimuthu as conductor
- Loose Mohan
- Rajavelu
- M. R. Krishnamurthy
- Haja Shareef
- Chitra Guptan as Ramkanth's uncle
- Bayilvan Ranganathan as Ponnusamy
- Swaminathan
- Omakuchi Narasimhan as Arogyam
- Pasi Narayanan
- Thayir Vadai Desigan as Bheemarajan
- Karuppu Subbiah as Ramkanth's father
- Marthandan
- Kottai Perumal
- Baby Bhanu
- Baby Bhavani
- Nalinikanth
- V. Gopalakrishnan as doctor
- Kanal Kannan
- Napoleon as Mr. Dhilip Kumar in a guest appearance
- Siva in a guest appearance
- Ramesh Khanna in a guest appearance
- Dilip Kumar in a cameo appearance

== Soundtrack ==
The soundtrack was composed by Mano Ranjan, with lyrics written by Kalidasan, Vairamuthu and Dilip Kumar.

Song	Singer(s)	Duration
"Aathadi Chinna Ponnu"	Minmini, Chorus	4:12
"Avasarama Romba"	S. P. Sailaja, Chorus	4:18
"Ezhai Veetil" (female)	Vani Jairam	4:24
"Ezhai Veetil" (male)	Mano	0:47
"Kalaikalin Thaaye"	Malaysia Vasudevan, Sakthi Shanmugam, K. S. Chithra	4:50
"Kanni Thamizho Kamban Kaviyo"	S. P. Balasubrahmanyam	3:33
"Naam Irukkom"	S. P. Sailaja, Chorus	2:42

== Reception ==
Ayyappa Prasad of The Indian Express gave the film a positive review: "Dilip Kumar has handled the story with finesse" and praised the lead actors. The film was also reviewed by New Straits Times.
