= Poove Unakkaga (film) =

1996 film by Vikraman

- Theatrical release poster
- Directed by: Vikraman
- Written by: Vikraman
- Produced by: R. B. Choudary
- Starring: Vijay; Sangita
- Cinematography: S. Saravanan
- Edited by: V. Jaishankar
- Music by: S. A. Rajkumar
- Production company: Super Good Films
- Release date: 15 February 1996
- Running time: 144 minutes
- Country: India
- Language: Tamil

Poove Unakkaga (Note: Spelt as Poove Unakkagha on the CBFC certificate and the title card.) (transl. For you, Flower) is a 1996 Indian Tamil-language romantic comedy film written and directed by Vikraman, and produced by R. B. Choudary. The film stars Vijay and Sangita in the lead roles.

Poove Unakkaga was released on 15 February 1996. The film received critical acclaim and became a commercial blockbuster. It is the first major breakthrough in Vijay's career. It ran for over 270 days in theatres across Tamil Nadu cult following . The film was remade in Kannada as Ee Hrudaya Ninagagi (1997), in Telugu as Subhakankshalu (1997) and in Hindi as Badhaai Ho Badhaai (2002).

== Plot ==
Sadasivam and Stephen were family friends for generations until Sadhasivam's daughter Janaki fell in love with Stephen's son Robert. Both families oppose since they belong to different religions. The couple elopes and marries, leading to their families abandoning them. Thus, enmity begins between the two families, and they start to hate each other. Vasudevan is Sadhasivam's son, and Moses is Stephen's son.

After 25 years, both families receive a letter from Raja, who was born to Robert and Janaki and is visiting the families. Both families get furious seeing the letter and decide not to allow him to stay in their homes. Raja comes to the town with his friend Gopi, but is shocked to find that he is not allowed inside either house. Also, Vasudevan and Moses ask the entire street not to rent any house to Raja and Gopi. Velangiri lives with his wife and allows Raja to stay in his house.

Though Sadhasivam and Stephen do not welcome Raja, they long to see their grandson from afar. The same is the case with their wives Ranganayaki and Rosy. Raja understands that only Vasudevan and Moses are still angry, while the other family members pretend to be angry, so he decides to unite the family. He slowly gets close with his grandparents. Ranganayaki and Rosy want to get Raja married. To escape, Raja lies that he is already married to a girl named Nirmala Mary aka Nimmy.

To Raja's shock, one day, Nirmala suddenly arrives at Velangiri's home, introducing herself as Raja's wife. Raja gets confused and cannot reveal the truth, as that would further disturb the progress he has made with the families. Nirmala plays pranks on Raja and Gopi, which always irritates them. One day, Raja pretends to try to have sex with Nirmala so she will reveal her true identity. Nirmala reveals that she is actually Priyadarshini aka Priya, the daughter of Robert and Janaki. She also says that the only man who stays in touch with her family in the town is Velangiri, from whom they get frequent updates about the happenings. Now, Priya questions Raja's intention behind trying to unite both families.

Raja reveals a flashback. He is an orphan who lives with Gopi in Chennai. Next to his house, there is a girls’ hostel. Nandhini, the daughter of Vasudevan, is one such girl who stays in that hostel. Raja gets attracted upon seeing Nandhini and befriends her. Slowly, Raja falls in love with Nandhini, but when he is about to convey his love to her, he is shocked to realize that she is already in love with Lawrence, Moses's son. As there is already enmity between the two families, the couple fears whether their love would be accepted by their family members.

Upon knowing about the problem, Raja decides to help the couple unite with their family's approval. He takes responsibility for convincing both families and disguises himself as the son of Robert and Janaki. Priya is surprised by Raja's intention of uniting the family, despite knowing that Nandhini is in love with Lawrence. Priya gets attracted to Raja and falls for him, but does not express it.

Meanwhile, both families find out that Nandhini and Lawrence are in love and become furious again. Raja makes the family members realize that love is eternal and knows no religion or caste. Both families are convinced by Raja's words and agree to the wedding between Lawrence and Nandhini.

On the day of the wedding, both Robert and Janaki arrive. The family members happily welcome them and apologize for keeping them away for 25 years. Both families say that Raja was responsible for reuniting the families. Robert and Janaki are surprised and reveal that they have only one child, who is a daughter named Priyadarshini. Priya reveals that Raja is Nandhini's friend and has come to unite the families so that they can get married. Both families feel proud seeing Raja, and they suggest marrying Priya to him. However, Raja denies, saying that he has already fallen in love with someone (Nandhini) and can never fall in love with another girl. The film ends with Raja leaving the house and walking away alone.

== Cast ==
- Vijay as Raja
- Sangita as Priyadarshini (Nirmala Mary)
- Anju Aravind as Nandhini
- M. N. Nambiar as Sadhasivam
- Nagesh as Stephen
- Malaysia Vasudevan as Vasudevan, Sadhasivam's son
- Jai Ganesh as Moses, Stephen's son
- Charle as Gopi
- C. R. Vijayakumari as Ranganayagi, Sadhasivam's wife
- Sukumari as Rosy, Stephen's wife
- P. R. Varalakshmi as Lakshmi, Vasudevan's wife
- Meesai Murugesan as Velangiri
- Vijayachandrika as Shenbagam, Velangiri's wife
- R. S. Shivaji as Vasudevan's assistant
- Sakthi Kumar as Lawrence
- Madhan Bob as Director Kaada
- Siva as Robert
- Tharini as Janaki
- Sheela as Meena
- Dinesh as Ravi
- Murali as himself (guest appearance in the song "Machinichi")

Uncredited

- Singamuthu as Hostel Watchman
- Viji as herself (guest appearance in the song "Machinichi")
- K. Sivasankar (guest appearance)
- Rajakumaran as a cyclist
- Hemalatha (guest appearance in the song "Sollamalae")

== Soundtrack ==
The music was composed by S. A. Rajkumar, in his 50th film as a composer.

Track listing
No.	Title	Lyrics	Singer(s)	Length
1.	"Anantham Anantham" (female)	Palani Bharathi	K. S. Chithra	06:08
2.	"Sollamalae"	Palani Bharathi	Sujatha, P. Jayachandran	04:42
3.	"Chiclet Chiclet"	S. A. Rajkumar	Mano	04:25
4.	"Anantham Anantham" (male)	Palani Bharathi	P. Unnikrishnan	06:21
5.	"Oh Pyari"	Vaali	Adithyan, S. A. Rajkumar, Mohammed Aslam	04:19
6.	"Machinichi"	Palani Bharathi	T. L. Maharajan, Sujatha, Unnikrishnan, Sunanda	03:46
7.	"Idhayangal Naluvuthu"	Palani Bharathi	Sujatha	03:00
8.	"Anantham Anantham" (bit)	Palani Bharathi	P. Jayachandran	01:22
Total length:				28:61

== Reception ==
Ananda Vikatan rated the film 43 out of 100. Kalki praised Vikraman for giving the old love caste plot a new treatment while also praising the performances of actors, humour and climax dialogues, but found Rajkumar's music as the only drawback. The Hindu wrote, "The crux of the theme might have figured in some movies but the intensity the mounting situations generate in Supergood Films' Poovae Unakkaga makes director Vikraman one of the intelligent figures in the industry, his dialogue and screenplay, based on his story, making the main characters gain extra dimensions".
