= Vikraman =

Indian film director

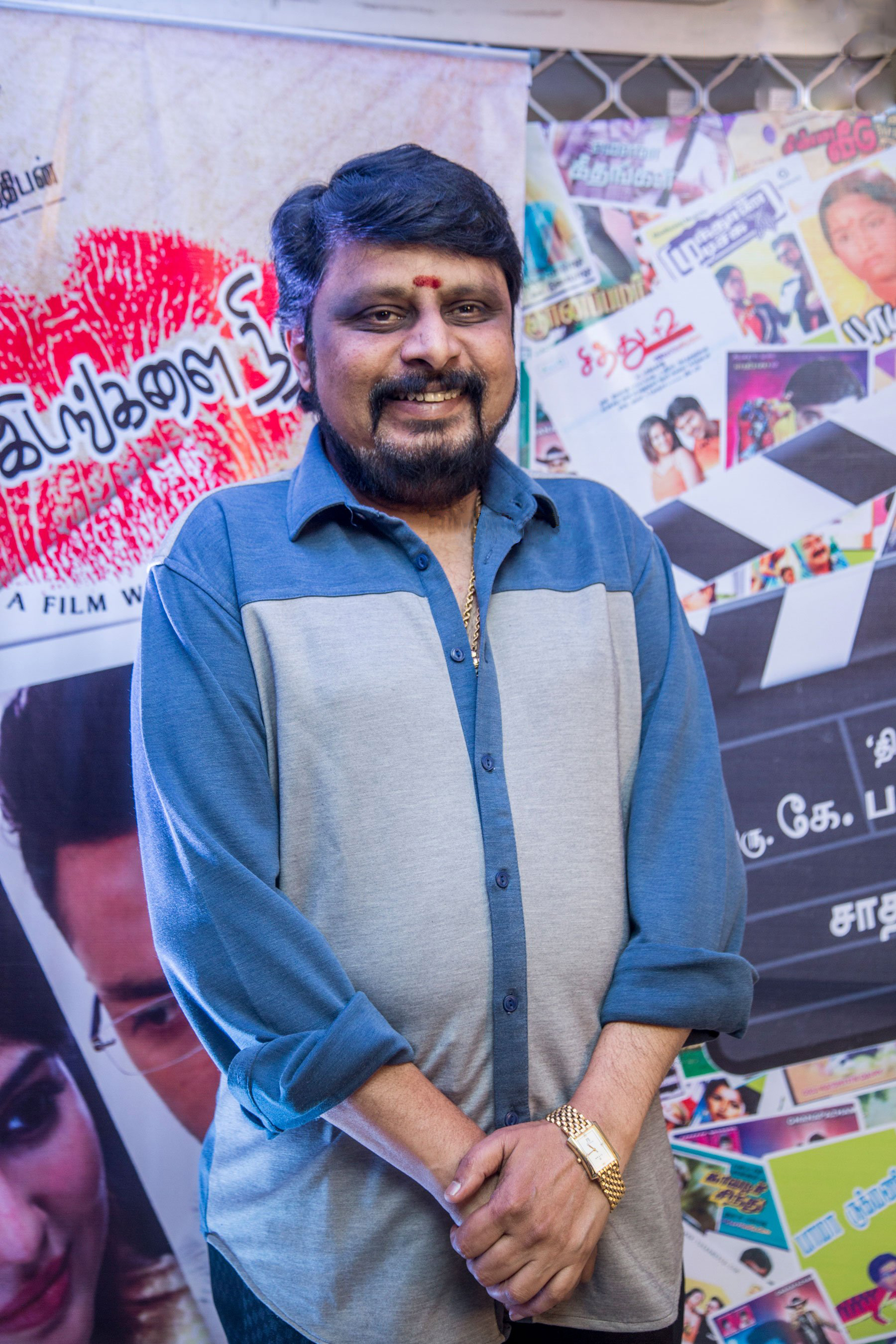
- Vikraman at Koditta Idangalai Nirappuga's audio launch in 2016
- Born: 30 March 1964 (age 62); Panpoli, Tenkasi, Tamil Nadu, India
- Occupations: Film director, screenwriter
- Years active: 1990–present
- Spouse: Jayapriya
- Children: 2
- Awards: Kalaimamani Award (1999)

Vikraman is an Indian film director and screenwriter primarily working in Tamil cinema.

== Personal life ==
Vikraman married Jayapriya. The couple have a son Vijay Kanishka and a daughter Pooja Prathush.

Tamil Nadu State government awarded Kalaimamani Award Vikraman Jayapriya in 2023 for her contribution to art through for Kuchipudi Dance. It was announced in September 2025.

== Career ==
=== 1990–1994 ===
He worked as an assistant to actor and director R. Parthiban in Puthiya Pathai (1989), which was the latter's debut film as a director and an actor. Vikraman made his directorial debut with the film Pudhu Vasantham (1990) produced by R. B. Choudary, for which director K. S. Ravikumar apprenticed under him as an assistant director. The film was about four unemployed friends and musical experts who find themselves unexpectedly saddled with a young woman. Upon release, the film received critical acclaim and it re-wrote Tamil cinema history, sparking a whole range of "friendship" films. Its hero Murali went on to become a romantic actor in subsequent films. His second film Perum Pulli (1991) received negative reviews with N. Krishnaswamy of The Indian Express stating, "Directed by Vikraman who made Pudhu Vasantham and made name for himself [..] Perum Pulli has a hash of a story" and it bombed at the box-office. His next two films Naan Pesa Ninaipathellam (1993) and Gokulam (1993) received mixed reception. In 1994, his venture Pudhiya Mannargal starring Vikram and with music composed by A. R. Rahman flopped at the box-office despite a revolutionary theme of students and politics. A critic wrote, "Nothing much in this movie but a controversial idea".

=== 1996–2002 ===
Vikraman was recalled once again by R. B. Choudary to make a film with Vijay titled Poove Unakkaga in 1996. It was the first breakthrough in the young actor's career. His next film Suryavamsam (1997) with Sarath Kumar and Devayani was a major success. Unnidathil Ennai Koduthen (1998) gave a fresh lease of life to both Karthik and Roja who were once dominating the film industry. In 2000, he made a film Vanathai Pola with an ensemble cast, another blockbuster which gave back the superstardom to Vijayakanth. It also won the National Film Award for Best Popular Film Providing Wholesome Entertainment in 2001 and also many state awards. He then began pre-production work in 2000 for a film starring Suriya, Laila and Sneha, and the said project Unnai Ninaithu (2002) did well.

=== 2003–2014 ===
His next film Priyamaana Thozhi (2003) produced by the AVM Productions was a hit again. Its simultaneously shot Telugu version, Vasantham in (helmed by himself) was one of the top grossers of 2003. He had to face another dud in 2004 in Cheppave Chirugali, a Telugu remake of his Tamil film starring Suriya and Sneha, Unnai Ninaithu. Taking a two-year break, he had started work again for a Tamil film called Chennai Kadhal (2006) with Bharath in the lead. However, the film was unsuccessful at the box office. He made a comeback with Mariyadhai in 2009, another Tamil film starring Vijayakanth, Meena, Meera Jasmine and Ambika playing the lead roles. His latest film Ninaithathu Yaaro featuring newcomers released in 2014.

=== Others ===
Vikraman has been elected as the new president of the Tamil Nadu Film Directors Association (TANTIS) replacing Bharathiraja after he defeated fellow director Visu in the election.

== Style ==
Vikraman is well known for making family dramas which portray emotions such as friendship, family values.

== Filmography ==
=== As director and screenwriter ===
- Note: all films are in Tamil, unless otherwise noted.

Year	Title	Notes
1990	Pudhu Vasantham	Tamil Nadu State Film Award for Best Director; Tamil Nadu State Film Award for Best Film; Filmfare Award for Best Film – Tamil
1991	Perum Pulli	Also lyricist for "Aagayam Thottil"
1993	Gokulam	
1993	Naan Pesa Ninaipathellam	Also lyricist for "Kadhal Ennum"
1994	Pudhiya Mannargal	
1996	Poove Unakkaga	
1997	Surya Vamsam	Tamil Nadu State Film Award for Best Film; Tamil Nadu State Film Award for Best Director; Cinema Express Award for Best Film – Tamil
1998	Unnidathil Ennai Koduthen	Cinema Express Award for Best Film – Tamil; Tamil Nadu State Film Award for Best Film (3rd place); Tamil Nadu State Film Award for Best Story Writer
2000	Vaanathaippola	National Film Award for Best Popular Film Providing Wholesome Entertainment; Tamil Nadu State Film Award for Best Film; Tamil Nadu State Film Award for Best Director
2002	Unnai Ninaithu	Tamil Nadu State Film Award for Best Film (3rd place)
2003	Priyamaana Thozhi	
2003	Vasantam	Telugu film; made simultaneously alongside Priyamaana Thozhi
2004	Cheppave Chirugali	Telugu film; remake of Unnai Ninaithu
2006	Chennai Kadhal	
2009	Mariyadhai	
2014	Ninaithathu Yaaro	

=== Frequent collaborators ===
Collaborator	Pudhu Vasantham; (1990)	Perum Pulli; (1991)	Gokulam; (1993)	Naan Pesa Ninaipathellam; (1993)	Pudhiya Mannargal; (1994)	Poove Unakkaga; (1996)	Surya Vamsam; (1997)	Unnidathil Ennai Koduthen; (1998)	Vaanathaippola; (2000)	Unnai Ninaithu; (2002)	Priyamaana Thozhi; (2003)	Vasantam; (2003)	Cheppave Chirugali; (2004)	Chennai Kadhal; (2006)	Mariyadhai; (2009)	Ninaithathu Yaaro; (2014)
S. A. Rajkumar	Yes	Yes				Yes	Yes	Yes	Yes		Yes	Yes	Yes			
Sirpy			Yes	Yes						Yes			Yes			
V. Jaishankar						Yes	Yes	Yes	Yes	Yes	Yes					
Ramesh Khanna			Cameo	Cameo				Yes		Yes	Yes		Yes			
K. Thanigachalam	Yes	Yes	Yes	Yes												
S. Saravanan					Yes	Yes	Yes				Yes					

=== Actor ===
- Kadhal Virus (2002)
- Obama Ungalukkaaga (2021)

== Awards ==
- Kalaimamani Award - 1999
