= List of songs recorded by Sujatha Mohan =

Indian playback singer

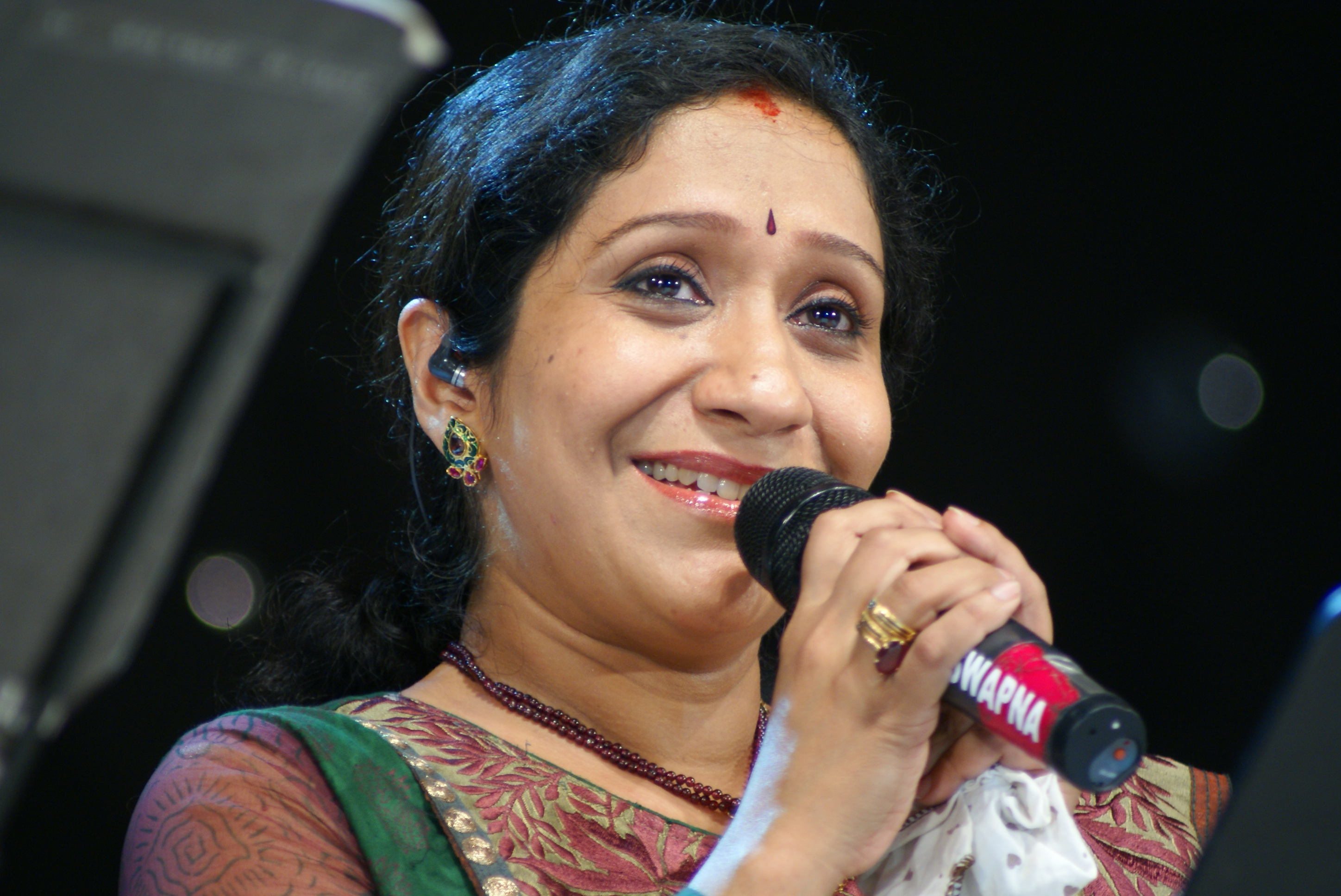
Sujatha in a singing reality show

Sujatha Mohan is a renowned Indian playback singer known for her contributions to a wide range of Indian film industries, particularly in Malayalam, Tamil, and Telugu cinema. Over her decades-long career, she has also recorded songs in other languages including Kannada, Badaga, Hindi. As of 2021, she had sung more than 6,000 songs. She has worked with a wide array of prominent music composers such as A. R. Rahman, Vidyasagar, S. A. Rajkumar, and Mani Sharma, and has frequently performed duets with legendary playback singers including K. J. Yesudas, Hariharan. Her unique voice often described as husky yet melodious along with her ability to adapt to diverse musical styles, has earned her a devoted following across generations of music lovers.

== Malayalam film songs ==
=== 1975-1999 ===
Year	Film	Song(s)	Composer(s)	Writer(s)	Co-artist(s)
1975	Tourist Bungalow	"Kannezhuthi Pottuthottu"	M. K. Arjunan	O. N. V. Kurup	
1975	Kaamam Krodham Moham	"Swapnam Kaanum Penne"	Shyam	Bharanikkavu Sivakumar	K. J. Yesudas
1975	Kaamam Krodham Moham	"Rajaadhiraajante"	Shyam	Bichu Thirumala	Bichu Thirumala, Ambili
1977	Aparadhi	"Nanma Nerum Amma"	Salil Chowdhary	P. Bhaskaran	Latha Raju, Master Sreejith
1977	Aparadhi	"Thumbi Thumbi"	Salil Chowdhary	P. Bhaskaran	Ambili
1987	Cheppu	"Marivillin Chirakode"	Raghu Kumar	Poovachal Khader	K. J. Yesudas
1988	Mukunthetta Sumitra Vilikkunnu	"Poovine"	Ouseppachan	Shibu Chakravarthy	M. G. Sreekumar, Janamma David
1988	Theruvu Narthaki	"Muracherukkan Vannu"	Vijaya Bhaskar	Mankombu Gopalakrishnan	K. S. Chithra
1988	Oru Muthassi Katha	"Kandaal Chirikkaatha"	Ouseppachan	Shibu Chakravarthy	M. G. Sreekumar
1988	Oru Muthassi Katha	"Nalla Muthassiyamma"	Ouseppachan	Shibu Chakravarthy	M. G. Sreekumar, P. Leela, C. O. Anto
1988	Aryan	"Om Jai Jagadish Hare"	Raghu Kumar	Kaithapram	
1988	Aryan	"Ponmuraliyoothum"	Raghu Kumar	Kaithapram	M. G. Sreekumar
1988	Aryan	"Shanthimanthram Theliyum"	Raghu Kumar	Kaithapram	M. G. Sreekumar, Kaithapram
1988	Vellanakalude Nadu	"Paaduvan Ormakalil"	M. G. Radhakrishnan	Kaithapram	M. G. Sreekumar
1988	Chithram	"Doore Kizhakkudhikkin"	Kannur Rajan	Shibu Chakravarthy	M. G. Sreekumar
1988	Chithram	"Paadam Koyyum Munpe"	Kannur Rajan	Shibu Chakravarthy	
1988	Chithram	"Kaadumi Naadumellam"	Kannur Rajan	Shibu Chakravarthy	Mohanlal
1989	Kalpana House	"Etho Manohariyaam"	Anu Malik	Poovachal Khader	P. Jayachandran
1989	Kalpana House	"Oru Agnithan Karangal"	Anu Malik	Poovachal Khader	Krishnachandran
1989	Vandanam	"Theeram Thedum"	Ouseppachan	Shibu Chakravarthy	M. G. Sreekumar
1989	Vandanam	"Anthiponvettam"	Ouseppachan	Shibu Chakravarthy	M. G. Sreekumar
1989	Vandanam	"Kavilinayil"	Ouseppachan	Shibu Chakravarthy	Ouseppachan, M. G. Sreekumar
1989	Vandanam	"Meghangale"	Ouseppachan	Shibu Chakravarthy	Nedumudi Venu
1989	Nair Saab	"Pazhayoru Paattile"	S. P. Venkatesh	Shibu Chakravarthy	M. G. Sreekumar
1989	Mazhavilkavadi	"Pallitherundo"	Johnson	Kaithapram	G. Venugopal
1990	Aye Auto	"AEIOU"	Raveendran	Bichu Thirumala	Mohanlal
1990	Chuvanna Kannukal	"Kallolam"	Jerry Amaldev	Poovachal Khader	Unni Menon, Krishnachandran
1990	Malootty	"Mounathin Idanaazhiyil" & "Swargangal Swapnam Kaanum"	Johnson	Pazhavila Rameshan	K. J. Yesudas & G. Venugopal
1990	Dr. Pasupathy	"Kanakam Mannil"	Johnson	Bichu Thirumala	M. G. Sreekumar
1990	Cheriya Lokavum Valiya Manushyarum	"Thoovennilavu" & "Athikkulangara Melam"	Johnson	Kaithapram	G. Venugopal & M. G. Sreekumar
1990	Gajakesariyogam	"Nirmaalakkaavil"	Johnson	Kaithapram	Unni Menon
1990	Oliyampukal	"Aadi Prakrithi"	M. S. Viswanathan	O. N. V. Kurup	M. G. Sreekumar
1990	Shubhayathra	"Sindhooram Thookum"	Johnson	P. K. Gopi	Unni Menon
1990	Thalayana Manthram	"Thooval Vinnin"	Johnson	Kaithapram	G. Venugopal
1990	Lal Salam	"Aaro Porunnen Koode"	Raveendran	O. N. V. Kurup	M. G. Sreekumar, Raveendran
1990	Apoorva Sangamam	"Koove Koove"	Jerry Amaldev	Puthiyankam Murali	
1991	Apoorvam Chilar	"Chentharam Poothu"	Johnson	Kaithapram	
1991	Kakkathollayiram	"Paalaruvi Kuliraniyum"	Johnson	Kaithapram	M. G. Sreekumar
1991	Nayam Vyakthamakkunnu	"Paadoo Thalipoo"	Johnson	Kaithapram	G. Venugopal
1991	Vishnulokam	"Kasthoori Ente Kasthoori"	Raveendran	Kaithapram	M. G. Sreekumar
1991	Kankettu	"Gopihridayam Nirayunnu"	Johnson	Kaithapram	K. J. Yesudas
1991	Bhoomika	"Manassinoraayiram"	Raveendran	P. K. Gopi	K. J. Yesudas
1991	Aadhyamayi	"Aalilathoniyumaayi"	S. P. Venkatesh	Varkala Sreekumar	
1991	Ulladakkam	"Andhiveyil"	Ouseppachan	Kaithapram	K. J. Yesudas
1991	Kizhakkunarum Pakshi	"Kizhakkunarum Pakshi"	Raveendran	K. Jayakumar	K. J. Yesudas
1991	Godfather	"Neer Palunkukal"	S. Balakrishnan	Bichu Thirumala	M. G. Sreekumar
1991	Neelagiri	"Manjuveena"	M. M. Keeravani	P. K. Gopi	K. J. Yesudas
1992	Utsavamelam	"Ammaykkoru Ponnum", "Kanaka Manimaya", "Kasavulla Pattudutthu" & "Kunnirangi"	Mohan Sithara	O. N. V. Kurup	
1992	Sadayam	"Vaasantharaavin"	Johnson	Kaithapram	
1992	Ennodu Ishtam Koodamo	"Puthuvarna Vasantham"	S. P. Venkatesh	Kaithapram	K. J. Yesudas
1992	Ezhara Ponnana	"Unni Pirannal"	Johnson	Kaithapram	K. J. Yesudas
1992	Kamaladalam	"Kamaladalam Mizhiyil"	Raveendran	Kaithapram	M. G. Sreekumar
1992	Kasarkode Khaderbai	"Neelakkurkkan"	Johnson	Bichu Thirumala	Jolly Abraham, Krishnachandran, C. O. Anto
1992	Savidham	"Thoovaanam"	Johnson	Kaithapram	M. G. Sreekumar
1992	Yoddha	"Maampoove" & "Kunu Kune"	A. R. Rahman	Bichu Thirumala	K. J. Yesudas
1992	Adhwaytham	"Neelakkuyile Chollu" & "Thallikkalayillenkil"	M. G. Radhakrishnan	Kaithapram	M. G. Sreekumar
1992	Vietnam Colony	"Pavanarachezhuthunnu"	S. Balakrishnan	Bichu Thirumala	Kalyani Menon
1992	Poochakkaru Mani Kettum	"Malathi Mandapangal"	Johnson	Kaithapram	M. G. Sreekumar
1993	Dhruvam	"Thumbippenne”	S. P. Venkatesh	Shibu Chakravarthy	K. J. Yesudas
1993	Mithunam	"Poomanjin Koodarathil”	M. G. Radhakrishnan	O. N. V. Kurup	M. G. Sreekumar
1993	Butterflies	"Kanyasudha”	Raveendran	K. Jayakumar	M. G. Sreekumar
1993	Gandharvam	"Maliniyude Theerangal"	S. P. Venkatesh	Kaithapram	M. G. Sreekumar
1993	Meleparambil Anveedu	"Madhura Swapnangal"	Johnson	I. S. Kundoor	K. J. Yesudas
1993	Koushalam	"Innoraayiram"	Raveendran	Kaithapram	K. S. Chithra, Minmini
1993	Chenkol	"Paathira Palkadavil"	Johnson	Kaithapram	K. J. Yesudas
1993	Manichithrathazhu	"Oru Murai Vanthu Paarayo", "Akkuthikkuthanakkombil" & "Uthunga Sailangalkkum"	M. G. Radhakrishnan	Vaali	G. Venugopal, K. S. Chithra, M. G. Radhakrishnan
1993	Kabooliwala	"Kabooliwala Naadodi"	S. P. Venkatesh	Bichu Thirumala	
1994	Pavithram	"Sreeragamo", "Thaalamayanju", "Vaalinmel Poovum" & "Kannil Pedamaaninte"	Sharreth	O. N. V. Kurup	K. J. Yesudas, M. G. Sreekumar & G. Venugopal
1994	Thenmavin Kombath	"Ente Manassinoru"	Berny-Ignatius	Girish Puthenchery	M. G. Sreekumar
1994	Malappuram Haji Mahanaya Joji	"Maanam Mutte"	Johnson	Bichu Thirumala	M. G. Sreekumar, C. O. Anto
1994	Minnaram	"Oru Vallam Ponnum" & "Manjakunjikkalulla"	S. P. Venkatesh	Shibu Chakravarthy	M. G. Sreekumar
1994	Sainyam	"Mercury" & "Chellacherukkatte"	S. P. Venkatesh	Shibu Chakravarthy	Mano, Malgudi Subha & G. Venugopal
1994	Pidakkozhi Koovunna Noottandu	"Machakkurangachan"	S. P. Venkatesh	Kaithapram	K. S. Chithra, Sindhu, Urvashi, Jagathy Sreekumar
1994	Chakoram	"Palazhithirakalil"	Johnson	Kaithapram	K. J. Yesudas
1994	Santhanagopalam	"Thaaram Thookkum"	Johnson	V. Madhusoodanan Nair	P. Jayachandran
1995	Mangalyasoothram	"Vellaaram Kilikal"	Berny-Ignatius	Girish Puthenchery	P. Jayachandran
1995	Mazhayethum Munpe	"Swarnapakshi Swarnapakshi"	R. Anandh	Kaithapram	Manoj
1995	Oru Abhibhashakante Case Diary	"Kanikkonnakal"	Raveendran	Shibu Chakravarthy	
1995	Thacholi Varghese Chekavar	"Soorya Nalam"	Sharreth	Vayalar Sarath Chandra Varma	K. J. Yesudas & solo
1995	Minnaminuginum Minnukettu	"Kunungikkunungi"	S. P. Venkatesh	Girish Puthenchery	
1995	Saadaram	"Sarathkkala"	Johnson	Kaithapram	K. J. Yesudas
1995	Street	"Thaaraatti Njan"	Tomin Thachankari	Kaithapram	Sangeetha Sajith
1995	No. 1 Snehatheeram Bangalore North	"Appom Chuttu"	Jerry Amaldev	Girish Puthenchery	
1995	Sindhoora Rekha	"Raavil Veenanaadham" & "Ente Sindhoora Rekha"	Sharreth	Kaithapram	K. J. Yesudas & Srinivas
1995	Mangalam Veettil Manaseswari Gupta	"Kannippenne Penne"	Johnson	Girish Puthenchery	
1995	Ezharakoottam	"Uthraalikkavile"	Johnson	Shibu Chakravarthy	
1996	Azhakiya Ravanan	"Pranayamani Thooval” (female)	Vidyasagar	Kaithapram	
1996	Devaraagam	"Thaazhampoo"	M. M. Keeravani	M. D. Rajendran	Sindhu
1996	Indraprastham	"Mazhavillin Kottarathil”	Vidyasagar	Kaithapram	Biju Narayanan
1996	Kaanaakkinaavu	"Ezhaam Beharinte"	Raghu Kumar	Gireesh Puthenchery	M. G. Sreekumar
1996	Desadanam	"Engane Njan"	Kaithapram	Kaithapram	
1996	Rajaputhran	"Hello Hello"	M. Jayachandran	Gireesh Puthenchery	M. G. Sreekumar
1996	Rajaputhran	"Mizhi Pookkal"	M. Jayachandran	Gireesh Puthenchery	
1996	Ee Puzhayum Kadannu	"Vaidoorya Kammalaninju"	Johnson	Gireesh Puthenchery	M. G. Sreekumar, K. S. Chithra
1996	Ee Puzhayum Kadannu	"Kaakka Karumban"	Johnson	Gireesh Puthenchery	
1996	Saamoohyapaadam	"Thiruvonakkili"	S. P. Venkatesh	Shibu Chakravarthy	M. G. Sreekumar
1997	Varnapakittu	"Okkela Okkela"	Vidyasagar	Gireesh Puthenchery	M. G. Sreekumar
1997	Manthra Mothiram	"Manjin Maarkazhi"	Johnson	S. Ramesan Nair	M. G. Sreekumar
1997	Gangothri	"Kunjikuyil Paattil"	S. P. Venkatesh	Gireesh Puthenchery	M. G. Sreekumar
1997	Lelam	"Kurumaali Kunninu"	Ouseppachan	Gireesh Puthenchery	M. G. Sreekumar
1997	Mayaponman	"Nimishadalangalil Nee"	Mohan Sithara	S. Ramesan Nair	
1997	Chandralekha	"Innale Mayangunna"	Berny-Ignatius	Gireesh Puthenchery	
1997	Superman	"Aavaram Poovinmel"	S. P. Venkatesh	S. Ramesan Nair	Biju Narayanan
1997	Superman	"Onathumbi Paadoo"	S. P. Venkatesh	S. Ramesan Nair	
1997	Guru	"Minnaram Maanathu"	Ilaiyaraaja	S. Ramesan Nair	
1997	Anubhoothi	"Mouname"	Shyam	P. N. Vijayakumar	
1997	Anubhoothi	"Neelanjanam"	Shyam	M. D. Rajendran	
1997	Kalyana Kacheri	"Pakal Mayunnu"	S. P. Venkatesh	Gireesh Puthenchery	
1997	Krishnagudiyil Oru Pranayakalathu	"Vinnile"	Vidyasagar	Gireesh Puthenchery	M. G. Sreekumar
1997	Kottappurathe Koottukudumbam	"Pennin Vaakku Kelkkenam"	Kaithapram	Kaithapram	Biju Narayanan, Ambili, Pradip Somasundaran, R. K. Ramdas
1997	Rishyasringan	"Vibhavari Ragam"	Johnson	S. Ramesan Nair	K. J. Yesudas
1997	Rishyasringan	"Guru Brahma"	Johnson	S. Ramesan Nair	
1997	Sammanam	"Mampulli Marukulla"	Johnson	Kaithapram	
1998	Nakshatratharattu	"Neeyente Paattil"	Mohan Sithara	Gireesh Puthenchery	K. J. Yesudas
1998	Pranayavarnangal	"Varamanjaladiya" (female)	Vidyasagar	Sachidanandan Puzhangattukara	
1998	Elavamkodu Desam	"Iniyenthe Kunjithathe"	Vidyasagar	O. N. V. Kurup	Arunmozhi, C. O. Anto
1998	Kaikudunna Nilavu	"Malayannaarkkannan" (Duet)	Kaithapram	Gireesh Puthenchery	K. J. Yesudas
1998	Kaikudunna Nilavu	"Malayannaarkkannan" (Female)	Kaithapram	Gireesh Puthenchery	
1998	Summer in Bethlehem	"Ethrayo Janmamaay" (Duet)	Vidyasagar	Gireesh Puthenchery	Srinivas
1998	Summer in Bethlehem	"Ethrayo Janmamaay" (Female)	Vidyasagar	Gireesh Puthenchery	
1998	Oru Maravathoor Kanavu	"Kanninilaa" (Duet)	Vidyasagar	Gireesh Puthenchery	Biju Narayanan
1998	Oru Maravathoor Kanavu	"Sundariye Sundariye" (Female)	Vidyasagar	Gireesh Puthenchery	K. J. Yesudas, Pushpavanam Kuppusamy
1998	Harikrishnans	"Minnal Kaivala"	Ouseppachan	Kaithapram	
1998	Ayaal Kadhayezhuthukayanu	"Kuppivala"	Raveendran	Kaithapram	M. G. Sreekumar
1998	Ayaal Kadhayezhuthukayanu	"Etho Nidrathan"	Raveendran	Kaithapram	K. J. Yesudas
1998	Punjabi House	"Ellam Marakkam"	Suresh Peters	S. Ramesan Nair	K. J. Yesudas
1998	Meenathil Thalikettu	"Maarivillinmel"	Ouseppachan	Gireesh Puthenchery	K. J. Yesudas
1998	Meenathil Thalikettu	"Oru Poovine" (Duet)	Ouseppachan	Gireesh Puthenchery	K. J. Yesudas
1998	Meenathil Thalikettu	"Oru Poovine" (Solo)	Ouseppachan	Gireesh Puthenchery	
1998	Sundarakilladi	"Nadodi Theyyavum"	Ouseppachan	Bichu Thirumala	K. J. Yesudas
1998	Ayushman Bhava	"Anthippoomaanam"	Johnson	Kaithapram	K. J. Yesudas
1998	Daya	"Swargam Thedi"	Vishal Bharadwaj	O. N. V. Kurup	
1998	Sooryaputhran	"Koodariya Kuyilamme"	Ouseppachan	S. Ramesan Nair	K. J. Yesudas
1998	Thalolam	"Then Nilaavil"	Kaithapram	Kaithapram	
1999	Aakasha Ganga	"Kai Niraye Snehavumay"	Berny-Ignatius	S. Ramesan Nair	K. J. Yesudas
1999	Angane Oru Avadhikkalathu	"Raavil Meghapakshi"	Johnson	Gireesh Puthenchery	
1999	Chandamama	"Rojappoo Kavilathu" (Duet)	Ouseppachan	Kaithapram	Unni Menon
1999	Chandamama	"Rojappoo Kavilathu" (Solo)	Ouseppachan	Kaithapram	
1999	Ustaad	"Naadodi Poonthinkal"	Vidyasagar	Gireesh Puthenchery	M. G. Sreekumar
1999	Ustaad	"Vennila Kombile"	Vidyasagar	Gireesh Puthenchery	K. J. Yesudas
1999	Megham	"Manjukaalam Nolkkum"	Ouseppachan	Gireesh Puthenchery	K. J. Yesudas
1999	Niram	"Prayam Nammil"	Vidyasagar	Bichu Thirumala	P. Jayachandran
1999	Niram	"Mizhiyariyaathe"	Vidyasagar	Bichu Thirumala	
1999	Ezhupunna Tharakan	"Minnum Nilaave"	Vidyasagar	Gireesh Puthenchery	K. J. Yesudas
1999	Ezhupunna Tharakan	"Enne Maranno Ponne"	Vidyasagar	Gireesh Puthenchery	K. J. Yesudas
1999	Ezhupunna Tharakan	"Thekkan Kaatte"	Vidyasagar	Gireesh Puthenchery	M. G. Sreekumar, Biju Narayanan, C. O. Anto, Radhika Thilak, Unni Menon
1999	Vasanthiyum Lakshmiyum Pinne Njaanum	"Thengapoolum Kokkilothukki"	Mohan Sithara	Yusufali Kechery	K. J. Yesudas
1999	Friends	"Kadal Kaattin"	Ilaiyaraaja	Kaithapram	
1999	Pattabhishekam	"Girijapathisukha"	Berny-Ignatius	Bichu Thirumala	K. J. Yesudas
1999	Pattabhishekam	"Poovukal Peyyum"	Berny-Ignatius	Bichu Thirumala	K. J. Yesudas
1999	Veendum Chila Veettukaryangal	"Mounam Ente"	Johnson	Kaithapram	
1999	Veendum Chila Veettukaryangal	"Pinnilaavin Poovidarnnu"	Johnson	Kaithapram	
1999	Veendum Chila Veettukaryangal	"Othu Pidichhavar"	Johnson	Kaithapram	
1999	Olympian Anthony Adam	"Hey Chumma Chumma" (Duet)	Ouseppachan	Gireesh Puthenchery	K. J. Yesudas
1999	Olympian Anthony Adam	"Kunnela" (Solo)	Ouseppachan	Gireesh Puthenchery	M. G. Sreekumar
1999	Vazhunnor	"Sandhyayum Ee Chandrikayum"	Ouseppachan	Gireesh Puthenchery	
1999	Njangal Santhushtaranu	"Kannil Thiri Thelikkum"	Ouseppachan	S. Ramesan Nair	
1999	Red Indians	"Hoyyare Hoyyare"	S. P. Venkatesh	Gireesh Puthenchery	Sindhu
1999	Agnisakshi	"Kannaanthali Muttathe"	Kaithapram	Kaithapram	
1999	Chandranudikkunna Dikkil	"Ambadi Payyukal" (Duet)	Vidyasagar	S. Ramesan Nair	K. J. Yesudas
1999	Chandranudikkunna Dikkil	"Oru Kunju Poovinte"	Vidyasagar	S. Ramesan Nair	K. J. Yesudas
1999	Chandranudikkunna Dikkil	"Thei Oru Thenavayal"	Vidyasagar	S. Ramesan Nair	M. G. Sreekumar, S. P. Balasubrahmanyam
1999	Chandranudikkunna Dikkil	"Bombattu Hudugi"	Vidyasagar	S. Ramesan Nair	M. G. Sreekumar
1999	Chandranudikkunna Dikkil	"Manju Peyyunna"	Vidyasagar	S. Ramesan Nair	
1999	Chandranudikkunna Dikkil	"Ambadi Payyukal" (Solo)	Vidyasagar	S. Ramesan Nair	
1999	Independence	"Oru Mutham Thedi"	Suresh Peters	S. Ramesan Nair	M. G. Sreekumar, Mano
1999	Janani	"Manjaadi Manikutta"	Ouseppachan	Kavalam Narayana Panicker	

=== 2000-Till date ===
Year	Film	Song(s)	Composer(s)	Writer(s)	Co-artist(s)
2000	Millenium Stars	"Parayaan Njan Marannu"	Vidyasagar	Gireesh Puthenchery	K. J. Yesudas, Hariharan, Vijay Yesudas
2000	Narasimham	"Aarodum Onnum"	M. G. Radhakrishnan	Gireesh Puthenchery	K. J. Yesudas
2000	Snehapoorvam Anna	"Akkare Veettil Anthonichanu"	Raju Singh	Shibu Chakravarthy	M. G. Sreekumar, Biju Narayanan
2000	Snehapoorvam Anna	"Karukappulmettile"	Raju Singh	Shibu Chakravarthy	M. G. Sreekumar
2000	Snehapoorvam Anna	"Ormayil Ennormayil"	Raju Singh	Shibu Chakravarthy	Solo
2000	Pilots	"Lillyppoovin Naavil"	M. G. Radhakrishnan	Samuel Koodal	Solo
2000	Life is Beautiful	"Iniyenthunalkanam"	Ouseppachan	Kaithapram	K. J. Yesudas
2000	Daivathinte Makan	"Muthumazhatherottam"	Vidyasagar	S. Ramesan Nair	M. G. Sreekumar
2000	Daivathinte Makan	"Kaliyaattam Thullale"	Vidyasagar	S. Ramesan Nair	Krishnachandran
2000	Manassil Oru Manjuthulli	"Pranayikkukayaayirunnu Naam"	Bombay Ravi	M. D. Rajendran	Solo
2000	Sradha	"Chola Malamkaattadikkanu"	Bharadwaj	Gireesh Puthenchery	M. G. Sreekumar
2000	Sradha	"Party Party Time"	Bharadwaj	Gireesh Puthenchery	M. G. Sreekumar
2000	Dreamz	"Manimuttathaavani Panthal"	Vidyasagar	Gireesh Puthenchery	K. J. Yesudas
2000	Dreamz	"Raathriyil"	Vidyasagar	Gireesh Puthenchery	Solo
2000	Madhuranombarakattu	"Dwadhashiyil"	Vidyasagar	Yusufali Kechery	K. J. Yesudas
2000	Madhuranombarakattu	"Munthirichelulla"	Vidyasagar	Yusufali Kechery	Biju Narayanan
2000	Sathyameva Jayathe	"Silu Silu"	M. Jayachandran	Gireesh Puthenchery	Solo
2000	Darling Darling	"Muthum Pavizhavum" (Version I)	Ouseppachan	S. Ramesan Nair	Hariharan
2000	Darling Darling	"Muthum Pavizhavum" (Version II)	Ouseppachan	S. Ramesan Nair	Srinivas
2000	Devadoothan	"Mathapoothiri"	Vidyasagar	Kaithapram	M. G. Sreekumar
2000	Thenkasipattanam	"Golmaalu"	Suresh Peters	Kaithapram	M. G. Sreekumar, Mano
2000	Thenkasipattanam	"Oru Simhamalayum Kaattil"	Suresh Peters	Kaithapram	Solo
2000	Melevaryathe Malakhakkuttikal	"Muthola Kottaram"	Berny Ignatius	S. Ramesan Nair	Santhosh Keshav
2001	Bharthavudyogam	"Kanikaanum Thaaram"	M. Jayachandran	S. Ramesan Nair	M. G. Sreekumar
2001	Dhosth	"Thathamma Peru"	Vidyasagar	S. Ramesan Nair	K. J. Yesudas
2001	Dubai	"Oru Paattin"	Vidyasagar	Gireesh Puthenchery	Srinivas, Nikhil K. Menon
2001	Ennum Sambhavami Yuge Yuge	"Neeyaambal Poovano"	P. Gopan	Yusufali Kechery	P. Jayachandran
2001	Goa	"Aakasha Megha Jaalakam"	Premkumar Vadakara	Gireesh Puthenchery	K. J. Yesudas
2001	Goa	"Aakasha Megha Jaalakam"	Premkumar Vadakara	Gireesh Puthenchery	Solo
2001	Goa	"Nilaaviral Thalodave"	Premkumar Vadakara	Gireesh Puthenchery	Biju Narayanan
2001	Kakkakuyil	"Aaraarum Kandillenno"	M. G. Sreekumar	Gireesh Puthenchery	M. G. Sreekumar
2001	Kakkakuyil	"Ponnumani Kannanumani"	M. G. Sreekumar	Gireesh Puthenchery	Solo
2001	Narendran Makan Jayakanthan Vaka	"Ammayum Nanmayum"	Johnson	Mullanezhi	Solo
2001	One Man Show	"Oru Mulam"	Suresh Peters	Kaithapram	Srinivas
2001	One Man Show	"Niramazhayil"	Suresh Peters	Kaithapram	Mano, Suresh Peters
2001	Praja	"Prakasha Gopurangale"	M. G. Radhakrishnan	M. D. Rajendran	M. G. Sreekumar
2001	Praja	"Prakasha Gopurangale II"	M. G. Radhakrishnan	M. D. Rajendran	Solo
2001	Randam Bhavam	"Marannittumenthino"	Vidyasagar	Gireesh Puthenchery	P. Jayachandran
2001	Ravanaprabhu	"Aattoram Azhakoram"	Suresh Peters	Gireesh Puthenchery	Solo
2001	Saivar Thirumeni	"Muttathe Mullathai"	Raveendran	Gireesh Puthenchery	K. J. Yesudas
2001	Soothradharan	"Perariyaam"	Raveendran	S. Ramesan Nair	Solo
2001	Soothradharan	"Raavil Aaro Vennilavin"	Raveendran	S. Ramesan Nair	K. J. Yesudas
2002	Kakki Nakshathram	"Kurumozhiyile"	Sanjeev Babu	S. Ramesan Nair	M. G. Sreekumar
2002	Mazhathullikkilukkam	"Velippenninu Thalikku"	Suresh Peters	S. Ramesan Nair	Srinivas
2002	Malayali Mamanu Vanakkam	"Maama Malayali Maama"	Suresh Peters	Gireesh Puthenchery	M. G. Sreekumar
2002	Kuberan	"Kanakachilanka"	Mohan Sithara	Gireesh Puthenchery	M. G. Sreekumar
2002	Kuberan	"Kannivasantham"	Mohan Sithara	Gireesh Puthenchery	K. J. Yesudas
2002	Kuberan	"Oru Mazhappakshi Paadunnu"	Mohan Sithara	Gireesh Puthenchery	Mohan Sithara, M. G. Sreekumar
2002	Oomappenninu Uriyadappayyan	"Enikkum Oru Navundenkil"	Mohan Sithara	Yusufali Kechery	K. J. Yesudas
2002	Oomappenninu Uriyadappayyan	"Mullaykku Kalyanaprayam Aayennu"	Mohan Sithara	Yusufali Kechery	M. G. Sreekumar, Sudeep Kumar
2002	Oomappenninu Uriyadappayyan	"Neela Nilaave"	Mohan Sithara	Yusufali Kechery	Solo
2002	Krishna Gopalakrishna	"Choodulla Kaattin"	Balachandra Menon	Bichu Thirumala	Balachandra Menon
2002	Kanmashi	"Chakkaramaavin Munthiri"	M. Jayachandran	S. Ramesan Nair	Solo
2002	Kanmashi	"Ambilimaamanumundallo"	M. Jayachandran	S. Ramesan Nair	Solo
2002	Onnaman	"Piranna Mannil"	S. P. Venkatesh	Gireesh Puthenchery	M. G. Sreekumar, Alex Paul
2002	Puthooramputhri Unniyarcha	"Thenulla Poovinte Nencham"	Usha Khanna	Yusufali Kechery	Biju Narayanan
2002	Kashillatheyum Jeevikkam	"Aarum Kaanaathe"	Shakeer Jackson	Chittoor Gopi	M. G. Sreekumar
2002	Meesa Madhavan	"Karimizhi Kuruviye"	Vidyasagar	Gireesh Puthenchery	Devanand
2002	Meesa Madhavan	"Ente Ellamellam"	Vidyasagar	Gireesh Puthenchery	K. J. Yesudas, Sreeja Ravi
2002	Meesa Madhavan	"Karimizhi Kuruviye"	Vidyasagar	Gireesh Puthenchery	Solo
2002	Chirikkudukka	"Ikkili Kurunnu"	Vinu Kiriyath	Gireesh Puthenchery	Vidhu Prathap
2002	Thandavam	"Chandramani Kammalaninju"	M. G. Sreekumar	Kaithapram	M. G. Sreekumar
2002	Thandavam	"Paalkkinnam"	M. G. Sreekumar	Kaithapram	M. G. Sreekumar
2002	Thandavam	"Pottuthotta Kiliye"	M. G. Sreekumar	Kaithapram	M. G. Sreekumar
2002	Nakshathrakkannulla Rajakumaran Avanundoru Rajakumari	"Ore Mugham"	Benny Kannan	S. Ramesan Nair	Solo
2002	Nakshathrakkannulla Rajakumaran Avanundoru Rajakumari	"Ore Mugham"	Benny Kannan	S. Ramesan Nair	Vidhu Prathap
2002	Kaiyethum Doorath	"Aravindanayana"	Ouseppachan	S. Ramesan Nair	Solo
2002	Kaiyethum Doorath	"Poove Oru Manimutham"	Ouseppachan	S. Ramesan Nair	Dr. Fahadh
2002	Kaiyethum Doorath	"Vasantharaavin"	Ouseppachan	S. Ramesan Nair	Vijay Yesudas
2002	Bamboo Boys	"Karutha Muthe"	Thej Merwin	Gireesh Puthenchery	K. J. Yesudas
2002	Bamboo Boys	"Karutha Muthe"	Thej Merwin	Gireesh Puthenchery	Solo
2002	Kunjikoonan	"Kanne Unaru Nee"	Mohan Sithara	Yusufali Kechery	Solo
2002	Pranayamanithooval	"Valakilukkam"	Mohan Sithara	Kaithapram	Jyotsna Radhakrishnan, Smitha
2002	Kattuchembakam	"Othiri Othiri"	Mohan Sithara	Yusufali Kechery	Solo
2002	Kattuchembakam	"Maane Peda Maane"	Mohan Sithara	Yusufali Kechery	Solo
2002	Kattuchembakam	"Kilimakale Nee Kando"	Mohan Sithara	Yusufali Kechery	P. Jayachandran
2002	Kattuchembakam	"Vellaram Kunnukalil"	Mohan Sithara	Yusufali Kechery	Radhika Thilak
2002	Ee Bhargavi Nilayam	"Kaavyashilpam"	Benny P. Thomas	S. Ramesan Nair	Varghese Antony
2002	Valkannadi	"Manikkuyile"	M. Jayachandran	S. Ramesan Nair	K. J. Yesudas
2002	Valkannadi	"Manikkuyile"	M. Jayachandran	S. Ramesan Nair	Solo
2002	Chathurangam	"Mizhiyil"	M. G. Sreekumar	Shibu Chakravarthy	M. G. Sreekumar
2002	Kalyanaraman	"Thumbi Kalyanathinu"	Berny Ignatius	Kaithapram	M. G. Sreekumar
2002	Kalyanaraman	"Raakadal Kadanjedutha"	Berny Ignatius	Kaithapram	Dr. Fahadh
2002	Nandanam	"Aarum"	Raveendran	Gireesh Puthenchery	Solo
2002	Nandanam	"Aarum"	Raveendran	Gireesh Puthenchery	P. Jayachandran
2002	Snehithan	"Karimizhiyaale"	Mohan Sithara	Yusufali Kechery	Solo
2002	Snehithan	"Premamadhu"	Mohan Sithara	Yusufali Kechery	Solo
2003	Chronic Bachelor	"Swayamvara Chandrike"	Deepak Dev	Kaithapram	P. Jayachandran
2003	Chronic Bachelor	"Shilayil Ninnum"	Deepak Dev	Kaithapram	Fahad
2004	Mambazhakkalam	"Kandu Kandu Kothi”	M. Jayachandran	Gireesh Puthanchery	
2004	Mayilattam	"Ma Mazhayile”	M. Jayachandran	Gireesh Puthanchery	
2006	Kanaka Simhasanam	"Sundarano Sooriyano”	M. Jayachandran	Rajeev Alunkal	
2009	Kaana Kanmani	"Muthe Muthe”	Shyam Dharman	Vayalar Sarathchandra Varma	Shyam Dharman

She has sung many other songs in Malayalam and a larger list is available at the Malayalam wiki-page https://ml.wikipedia.org/wiki/സുജാത_മോഹൻ

== Malayalam album songs ==
- "Maathey" - (2025)
- "Ilamyel Kondu Njaan" – Ithal (2016)
- "Maayumee thaazvarayooram" – Album (2015)
- "Vaadyaghosham" – Kerala Piravi Day (2014)
- "Kanna Neeyengupoi" – Nandagopalam (2013)
- "Kayalthirakalil Kanneeralakalil" – Kulirmazhayai (2011)
- "Athramel Athramel" – Danaha (2011)
- "Ravereyayittum" – Pranayamarmaram (2009)
- "Ee Manjil" – Spandanam (2010)
- "Ennennum" – (2010)
- "Manju Peyyume" – Purple (2009)

== Telugu songs ==
=== 1990 - 2000 ===
Year	Film	Song	Composer(s)	Writer(s)	Co-artist(s)
1991	Talli Tandrulu	"Vinavamma"	Chakravarthy	Sirivennela Sitarama Sastry	S. P. Sailaja
1992	Roja	"Paruvam Vanaga"	A. R. Rahman	Rajasri	S. P. Balasubrahmanyam(SPB)
1992	Roja	"Na Cheli Rojave"	A. R. Rahman	Rajasri	S. P. Balasubrahmanyam(SPB)
1993	Padmavyuham	"Ninna Yee Kalavarintha"	A. R. Rahman	Rajasri	
1993	Gentleman	"Naa Inti Mundunna"	A. R. Rahman	Rajasri	SPB
1993	Donga Donga	"Thee Thee"	A. R. Rahman	Rajasri	
1994	Palnati Pourusham	"Raagala Silakaa"	A. R. Rahman	Rajasri	Mano
1994	Allarodu	"Teacher Teacher"	Vidyasagar	Bhuvanachandra	Mano
1994	Allarodu	"Sarangaa Srirangaa"	Vidyasagar	Bhuvanachandra	Mano
1994	Criminal	"Jama Jama Jama"	M. M. Keeravani	Sirivennela Sitarama Sastry	SPB, K. S. Chithra
1994	Gangmaster	"Baddaragiri Seethammaku"	A. R. Rahman	Veturi	Mano
1994	Super Police	"Telu Kuttina Thenalilo"	A. R. Rahman	Veturi	Mano, Suresh Peters
1994	Vaddu Bava Thappu	"My Dear Maradaluji"	Vidyasagar	Sirivennela Sitarama Sastry	Mano
1994	Duet	"Guthi Vankaay"	A. R. Rahman	Rajasri	
1994	Premikudu	"Oh Cheliya"	A. R. Rahman	Rajasri	P. Unnikrishnan
1994	Premikudu	"Gaali Taragalapai"	A. R. Rahman	Rajasri	
1995	Aayanaki Iddaru	"Arera Kothaga Undiro"	Koti	Bhuvanachandra	Mano
1995	Alluda Majaka	"Unga Unga"	Koti	Veturi	SPB
1995	Ketu Duplicate	"Nee Kosam"	Koti	Sirivennela Sitarama Sastry	SPB
1995	Rikshavodu	"Roop Tera Mastana"	Koti	Veturi	Baba Sehgal
1995	Rikshavodu	"Ardha Ratri"	Koti	Bhuvanachandra	SPB
1995	Sogasu Chooda Tarama!	"Akasamlo Neeli Mabbula"	Bharadwaj	Sirivennela Sitarama Sastry	SPB, Rohini
1995	Bombay	"Kulamela Mathamela"	A. R. Rahman	Veturi	
1995	Muthu	"Thillana Thillana"	A. R. Rahman	Bhuvanachandra	Mano
1996	Adirindi Alludu	"Muddante Mojupadi"	M. M. Keeravani	Sirivennela Sitarama Sastry	Mano
1996	Chinnabbayi	"Ninna Chusina Udayam"	Ilaiyaraaja	Sirivennela Sitarama Sastry	SPB
1996	Chinnabbayi	"Adagakandi"	Ilaiyaraaja	Sirivennela Sitarama Sastry	SPB
1996	Intlo Illalu Vantintlo Priyuralu	"Bol Bol Bolu Raja"	Koti	Shanmukha Sarma	SPB
1996	Mummy Mee Aayanochadu	"Maharani Manjulavani"	Vidyasagar	Sirivennela Sitarama Sastry	Mano
1996	Ninne Pelladata	"Naathora Thamashalalo"	Sandeep Chowta	Sirivennela Sitarama Sastry	Sanjeev Wadhwani
1996	Pavitra Bandham	"Mayadari Andama"	M. M. Keeravani	Sirivennela Sitarama Sastry	SPB
1996	Rayudugaru Nayudugaru	"Gadapalo Kudipadametti"	M. M. Keeravani	Suddala Ashok Teja	SPB
1996	Love Birds	"Repe Lokam"	A. R. Rahman	Sirivennela Sitarama Sastry	P. Unnikrishnan
1996	Indian	"Teppalelli Poyaka"	A. R. Rahman	Bhuvanachandra	SPB
1996	Mr. Romeo	"Mallikale Naa"	A. R. Rahman	Veturi	SPB, Swarnalatha
1997	Aaro Pranam	"Venavantra Abbai"	Veeru K	Sirivennela Sitarama Sastry	Jikki, SPB, Mano
1997	Abbayi Gari Pelli	"Sandelalo"	Koti	Bhuvanachandra	SPB
1997	Abbayi Gari Pelli	"Patte Manchamma"	Koti	Bhuvanachandra	
1997	Annamayya	"Vinaro Bhagyamu"	M. M. Keeravani	Annamacharya	SPB, M. M. Srilekha, Anuradha Sriram, M. M. Keeravani, Gangadhar, Anand, Renuka, Poornachandar, Anand Bhattacharya
1997	Annamayya	"Moosina Muthyalake"	M. M. Keeravani	Annamacharya	SPB, K. S. Chithra
1997	Annamayya	"Brahma Kadigina Padamu"	M. M. Keeravani	Annamacharya	K. S. Chithra, Keeravani, Poornachandar, Anuradha Sriram, Radhika
1997	Annamayya	"Ele Ele Maradala"	M. M. Keeravani	Veturi	SPB, Anuradha Sriram
1997	Annamayya	"Telugu Padaniki"	M. M. Keeravani	Veturi	SPB, Renuka
1997	Devudu	"Raa Raa Ranganna"	Sirpy	Sirivennela Sitarama Sastry	SPB, K. S. Chithra
1997	Hitler	"Koosindhi Kanne Koyila"	Koti	Bhuvanachandra	Mano
1997	Hitler	"Kanneellake Kanneelloche"	Koti	Sirivennela Sitarama Sastry	SPB, K. S. Chithra, Renuka, Anupamaa
1997	Maa Nannaku Pelli	"O Jabilamma"	Koti	Veturi	SPB
1997	Maa Nannaku Pelli	"Ninnu Choosi"	Koti	Sirivennela Sitarama Sastry	SPB
1997	Master	"Thilottama"	Deva	Chandrabose	Hariharan
1997	Muddula Mogudu	"Rave Rajahamsala"	Koti	Sirivennela Sitarama Sastry	SPB
1997	Pattukondi Chuddam	"Pattukondi Chuddam"	Veenapaani	Chandrabose	
1997	Priya O Priya	"Andamaina Brundavanam"	Koti	Chandrabose	SPB
1997	Subhakankshalu	"Panchavannela Chilaka"	S. A. Rajkumar	Sirivennela Sitarama Sastry	Mano
1997	Thaali	"Muddugummaliddaru"	Vidyasagar	Sirivennela Sitarama Sastry	Gangadhar
1997	Veedevadandi Babu	"Chamak Chamak"	Sirpy	Sirivennela Sitarama Sastry	Mano
1997	Veedevadandi Babu	"Chitti Chitti Guvvapilla"	Sirpy	Sirivennela Sitarama Sastry	Mano
1997	Merupu Kalalu	"Oh Vaana Padithe"	A. R. Rahman	Veturi	
1997	Rakshakudu	"Chandurini Takinadi"	A. R. Rahman	Bhuvanachandra	Hariharan
1997	50-50	"O Meghamaa"	A. R. Rahman	Sirivennela Sitarama Sastry	Unni Menon
1998	Aahaa..!	"Suvvi Suvvi"	Vandemataram Srinivas	Sirivennela Sitarama Sastry	Unnikrishnan, Malaysia Vasudevan
1998	Aavida Maa Aavide	"Thattaha Thattaha"	Sri	Sirivennela Sitarama Sastry	SPB
1998	Aavida Maa Aavide	"Two in One"	Sri	Sirivennela Sitarama Sastry	SPB, Anuradha Sriram
1998	Auto Driver	"Chandamama"	Deva	Veturi	Hariharan
1998	Auto Driver	"Emo Emo"	Deva	Veturi	SPB
1998	Auto Driver	"Mama Mazare"	Deva	Veturi	SPB, Swarnalatha
1998	Auto Driver	"Akkineni Akkineni"	Deva	Sirivennela Sitarama Sastry	Rajesh Krishnan
1998	Auto Driver	"Abbayi Abbayi Naku"	Deva	Sirivennela Sitarama Sastry	SPB
1998	Aayanagaru	"Kanne Lady"	Vidyasagar	Sirivennela Sitarama Sastry	SPB
1998	Aayanagaru	"Love Love La"	Vidyasagar	Sirivennela Sitarama Sastry	
1998	Aayanagaru	"Paluke Bangaramaye"	Vidyasagar	Sirivennela Sitarama Sastry	
1998	Aayanagaru	"Chinuku"	Vidyasagar	Sirivennela Sitarama Sastry	
1998	Bavagaru Bagunnara	"Navami Dasami"	Mani Sharma	Chandrabose	Hariharan
1998	Bavagaru Bagunnara	"Sorry Sorry"	Mani Sharma	Chandrabose	Mano
1998	Chandralekha	"Divvi Divvi Divvitam"	Sandeep Chowta	Sirivennela Sitarama Sastry	Sowmya Raoh
1998	Chandralekha	"Mogali Podalu"	Sandeep Chowta	Sirivennela Sitarama Sastry	Rajesh Krishnan
1998	Chandralekha	"Urumulu Nee Muvvalayi"	Sandeep Chowta	Sirivennela Sitarama Sastry	Rajesh Krishnan
1998	Choodalani Vundi	"Abbabba Iddu"	Mani Sharma	Veturi	SPB
1998	Ganesh	"Hindilona Chumma"	Mani Sharma	Chandrabose	Mano
1998	Ganesh	"Rajahamsamo"	Mani Sharma	Veturi	Hariharan
1998	Manasichi Choodu	"Inthe Ee Prema Varasa"	Mani Sharma	Sirivennela Sitarama Sastry	SPB
1998	Nenu Premisthunnanu	"Luli Luli"	Sirpy	Chandrabose	Mano
1998	Paradesi	"Jagati Sigalo"	M. M. Keeravani	Veturi	M. M. Keeravani
1998	Paradesi	"Tanuko Arako"	M. M. Keeravani	Chandrabose	Mano
1998	Pavitra Prema	"O Ranga Sriranga"	Koti	Bhuvanachandra	SPB
1998	Raayudu	"Sye Ante Sye Andi"	S. A. Rajkumar	Shanmukha Sarma	SPB
1998	Snehithulu	"Vanaa Vanaa"	Koti	Sirivennela Sitarama Sastry	SPB
1998	Suryavamsam	"Chukkalanni"	S. A. Rajkumar	Sirivennela Sitarama Sastry	SPB
1998	W/o V. Vara Prasad	"Ekkadiki Nee Parugu"	M. M. Keeravani	Sirivennela Sitarama Sastry	SPB, M. M. Srilekha
1998	Jeans	"Puvvullo Daagunna"	A. R. Rahman	Chandrabose	P. Unnikrishnan
1998	Premato	"Ooristhu Ooguthu"	A. R. Rahman	Sirivennela Sitarama Sastry	Srinivas, Kavita Krishnamurthy
1999	Chinni Chinni Aasa	"Mallepulla Jallule"	Raj	Sahithi	Mano
1999	English Pellam East Godavari Mogudu	"East Nunchi"	Mani Sharma	Vennelakanti	
1999	Iddaru Mitrulu	"Manasa Vaacha"	Mani Sharma	Chandrabose	SPB
1999	Krishna Babu	"Sakhi Masthu Masthu"	Koti	Chandrabose	Udit Narayan
1999	Krishna Babu	"Prema Patasalalo"	Koti	Chandrabose	Udit Narayan
1999	Pedda Manushulu	"Vaana Jallu"	Eeshwar	Sirivennela Sitarama Sastry	Mano
1999	Preyasi Raave	"Waiting to Kiss You"	M. M. Srilekha	Chandrabose	SPB
1999	Raja	"Kavvinchake O Prema"	S. A. Rajkumar	Sirivennela Sitarama Sastry	Rajesh Krishnan
1999	Rajakumarudu	"Eppudeppudu"	S. A. Rajkumar	Sirivennela Sitarama Sastry	SPB
1999	Samarasimha Reddy	"Andhaala Aadabomma"	Mani Sharma	Sirivennela Sitarama Sastry	Udit Narayan
1999	Samarasimha Reddy	"Lady Lady"	Mani Sharma	Bhuvanachandra	Mano
1999	Seenu	"Premante"	Mani Sharma	Vennelakanti	Hariharan
1999	Seetharama Raju	"Ekkasekka Thatta"	M. M. Keeravani	Sirivennela Sitarama Sastry	SPB, M. M. Keeravani
1999	Sneham Kosam	"Oohalalo Oopirilo"	S. A. Rajkumar	Bhuvanachandra	SPB
1999	Sultan	"Nandi Konda Meeda"	Koti	Veturi	Sukhwinder Singh
1999	Yamajathakudu	"Evaro Aa Sundari"	Vandemataram Srinivas	Chandrabose	Hariharan
2000	Annayya	"Gusagusale"	Manisharma	Veturi	Udit Narayan
2000	Annayya	"Vana Vallappa"	Manisharma	Veturi	Hariharan
2000	Postman	"Acha Tenugula"	Vandemataram Srinivas	Ghantadi Krishna	K. J. Yesudas
2000	Vamsoddharakudu	"Dole Dole"	Koti	Bhuvanachandra	Udit Narayan
2000	Kalisundam Raa	"Nuvve Nuvve"	S. A. Rajkumar	Sirivennela Sitarama Sastry	Hariharan
2000	Ravanna	"Poolakomma"	S. A. Rajkumar	Sirivennela Sitarama Sastry	Udit Narayan
2000	Nuvvu Vasthavani	"Meghamaai"	S. A. Rajkumar	Pothula Ravikiran	Rajesh Krishnan
2000	Pelli Sambandham	"Bhale Baagundi"	S. A. Rajkumar	Chandrabose	Rajesh Krishnan
2000	Manasunna Maaraju	"Oodala Oodala"	Vandemataram Srinivas	Sirivennela Sitarama Sastry	Mano, Malgudi Subha, Tippu
2000	Moodu Mukkalaata	"Prema Prema Andi"	M. M. Srilekha	Chandrabose	Sukhwinder Singh
2000	Sardukupodaam Randi	"Alakaluru Needata"	S. V. Krishna Reddy	Sirivennela Sitarama Sastry	SPB
2000	Oke Maata	"Raja Raja Chola"	Koti	Ghantadi Krishna	Devan
2000	Vamsi	"Koyilamma"	Mani Sharma	Sirivennela Sitarama Sastry	Udit Narayan
2000	Nuvve Kavali	"Shukriya Shukriya"	Koti	Bhuvanachandra	Koti
2000	Devullu	"Sirulanosagu Sukhashanthulu"	Vandemataram Srinivas	Jonnavittula	Swarnalatha
2000	Maa Annayya	"Maa Logililo"	S. A. Rajkumar	Veturi	SPB, Unni Menon, K. S. Chithra
2000	Maa Annayya	"Thaajaga Maa Intlo"	S. A. Rajkumar	Veturi	Mano, K. S. Chithra

=== 2001 - present ===
Year	Film	Song	Composer(s)	Writer(s)	Co-artist(s)
2001	Narasimha Naidu	"Abba Abba Andam"	Mani Sharma	Vennelakanti	Shankar Mahadevan
2001	Narasimha Naidu	"Ko Ko Komali"	Mani Sharma	Sirivennela Sitarama Sastry	Udit Narayan
2001	Devi Putrudu	"Tella Tellani Cheera"	Mani Sharma	Jonnavittula	Udit Narayan
2001	Suri	"Gumma Saradaga"	Vidyasagar	Kaluva Krishna Sai	Mano
2001	Suri	"Sarada Theeraleda"	Vidyasagar	Kaluva Krishna Sai	SPB
2001	Eduruleni Manishi	"Are Eelakotti"	S. A. Rajkumar	Chandrabose	Udit Narayan
2001	Eduruleni Manishi	"Dam Dama Dam Dam"	S. A. Rajkumar	Chandrabose	SPB, Shankar Mahadevan, Anuradha Sriram, Krishnaraj, P. Rajani
2001	Akka Bavekkada	"Muddu Meda Muddu"	S. A. Rajkumar	Chandrabose	Udit Narayan
2001	Akka Bavekkada	"Mensarey Mensarey"	S. A. Rajkumar	Chandrabose	Sukhwinder Singh, Swarnalatha
2001	Prematho Raa	"Punnamilaa"	Mani Sharma	Chandrabose	Udit Narayan
2001	Chinna	"Chiranjeevi Inti Kadha"	S. A. Rajkumar	Sirivennela Sitarama Sastry	SPB
2001	Chinna	"Ne Raasaanu"	S. A. Rajkumar	Sirivennela Sitarama Sastry	Rajesh Krishnan
2001	Chinna	"Oka Chitramaina Sanghatana"	S. A. Rajkumar	Sirivennela Sitarama Sastry	P. Unnikrishnan
2001	Repallelo Radha	"Gudi Gantale"	Koti	Sri Harsha	
2001	Bava Nachadu	"Anuragam Anuragamlo"	M. M. Keeravani	Chandrabose	Hariharan
2001	Bhalevadivi Basu	"Bava Bava"	Mani Sharma	Vennelakanti	SPB, K. S. Chithra
2001	Kalisi Naduddam	"Okka Sari Krindiki"	S. A. Rajkumar	Sirivennela Sitarama Sastry	Hariharan
2001	Kalisi Naduddam	"Kanchare Kanchare"	S. A. Rajkumar	Sirivennela Sitarama Sastry	Hariharan
2001	Simharasi	"Pedalante"	S. A. Rajkumar	Venigalla Rambabu	SPB
2001	Simharasi	"Telusa Nesthama"	S. A. Rajkumar	Venigalla Rambabu	Hariharan
2001	Simharasi	"Satyabhama"	S. A. Rajkumar	Venigalla Rambabu	Udit Narayan
2001	Naalo Unna Prema	"Enno Enno"	Koti	Sirivennela Sitarama Sastry	Hariharan
2001	Naalo Unna Prema	"Edalo Okate Korika"	Koti	Pothula Ravikiran	Tippu
2001	Chirujallu	"Hai Rama"	Vandemataram Srinivas	Veturi	SPB, S. P. Charan
2001	Manasantha Nuvve	"Manasantha Nuvve"	R. P. Patnaik	Sirivennela Sitarama Sastry	S. P. Charan
2001	Manasantha Nuvve	"Aakasana"	R. P. Patnaik	Sirivennela Sitarama Sastry	KK
2001	Prema Sandadi	"Chalo Chalo"	Koti	Veturi	Mano
2001	Snehamante Idera	"Cheliya Nee Premalone"	Shiva Shankar	Mrutyamjayudu	Hariharan
2001	Snehamante Idera	"Kanne Pillale"	Shiva Shankar	Chiravvuri Vijaykumar	Udit Narayan
2001	Snehamante Idera	"Naa Pedaviki Navvulu"	Shiva Shankar	Chiravvuri Vijaykumar	Rajesh Krishnan
2001	Veedekkadi Mogudandi!	"Julie Laila Sushma"	Koti	Sirivennela Sitarama Sastry	SPB
2001	Paravasam	"Athisaya Parinayam"	A. R. Rahman	Shiva Ganesh	Kalyani Menon, Sriram Narayan, Sriram Parthasarathy
2001	Hanuman Junction	"Oka Chinni Ledikuna"	Suresh Peters	Chandrabose	
2001	Hanuman Junction	"Golmaal Golmaal"	Suresh Peters	Veturi	Mano, K. S. Chithra, M. G. Sreekumar
2002	Seema Simham	"Chandamaama"	Mani Sharma	Sirivennela Sitarama Sastry	Hariharan
2002	Premaku Swagatam	"Vey Vey Vey"	S. V. Krishna Reddy	Veturi	SPB
2002	Priya Nestama	"Ningi Nela Okkatayela"	Bharani	Sirivennela Sitarama Sastry	SPB
2002	O Chinadana	"Vonti Meeda"	Vidyasagar	Sirivennela Sitarama Sastry	S. P. Charan, Swarnalatha, Mano
2002	Tappu Chesi Pappu Koodu	"Govinda Govinda"	M. M. Keeravani	Chiravvuri Vijaykumar	M. M. Keeravani
2002	Hai	"Ninnu Choosina"	Koti	Sirivennela Sitarama Sastry	Sandeep
2002	Hai	"Tante Padipoya"	Koti	Chandrabose	Rajesh Krishnan
2002	Adrustam	"Vayasa Vayasa"	Dhina	Kulasekhar	P. Unnikrishnan
2002	Neetho	"Jaajipulu"	Vidyasagar	Chandrabose	Febi Mani
2002	Bharata Simha Reddy	"Muchhattayna"	S. A. Rajkumar	Suddala Ashok Teja	SPB
2002	Chennakesava Reddy	"Em Pilla Kusalama"	Mani Sharma	Sirivennela Sitarama Sastry	SPB
2002	Siva Rama Raju	"Andala Chinni Devatha"	S. A. Rajkumar	Chandrabose	Shankar Mahadevan
2002	Siva Rama Raju	"Ding Ding"	S. A. Rajkumar	Chandrabose	Udit Narayan
2002	Siva Rama Raju	"Swagatham"	S. A. Rajkumar	Chandrabose	Udit Narayan
2002	Siva Rama Raju	"Nirupedela Devudivaiah"	S. A. Rajkumar	Chandrabose	SPB
2002	Sandade Sandadi	"Avuna Avuna Premalo"	Koti	Shamukha Sarma	Tippu
2002	Amrutha	"Sundari"	A. R. Rahman	Veturi	Hariharan, Tippu, Karthik, Srimathumitha
2003	Okkadu	"Cheppave Chirugali"	Mani Sharma	Sirivennela Sitarama Sastry	Udit Narayan
2003	Raghavendra	"Nee Styley"	Mani Sharma	Suddala Ashok Teja	Harish Raghavendra
2003	Taarak	"Sarasamika Sunday"	Mani Sharma	Chandrabose	Tippu
2003	Ottesi Cheputunna	"Yelo Yelo"	Vidyasagar	Bhuvanachandra	Udit Narayan
2003	Ottesi Cheputunna	"Padaharella"	Vidyasagar	Chandrabose	Debasish
2003	Palnati Brahmanayudu	"Oososi Poolateega"	Mani Sharma	Bhuvanachandra	Udit Narayan
2003	Donga Ramudu and Party	"Sirisiri Mallena"	Chakri	Sirivennela Sitarama Sastry	SPB
2003	Donga Ramudu and Party	"Preme Panchami Vennela"	Chakri	Sirivennela Sitarama Sastry	SPB
2003	Donga Ramudu and Party	"Edo Edo Theeyani"	Chakri	Sirivennela Sitarama Sastry	SPB
2003	Donga Ramudu and Party	"Kallalone Nuvvu"	Chakri	Sirivennela Sitarama Sastry	SPB
2003	Donga Ramudu and Party	"Vannelunna Naari"	Chakri	Sirivennela Sitarama Sastry	SPB
2003	Donga Ramudu and Party	"Chalirathiri Vastavani"	Chakri	Sirivennela Sitarama Sastry	Srinivas
2003	Vasantam	"Jampanduve"	S. A. Rajkumar	Veturi	Udit Narayan
2003	Vasantam	"Ammo Ammayena"	S. A. Rajkumar	Kulasekhar	Hariharan
2003	Kalyana Ramudu	"Gutthonkaya"	Mani Sharma	Sirivennela Sitarama Sastry	Shankar Mahadevan
2003	Dongodu	"Entha Panjesindee"	Vidyasagar	Sirivennela Sitarama Sastry	Hariharan
2003	Aadanthe Ado Type	"Chinnadani Soku"	Yuvan Shankar Raja	Surendra Krishna	Tippu
2003	Abhimanyu	"Kola Koloyamma"	Mani Sharma	Chandrabose	Udit Narayan
2003	Villain	"Naa Gunde Gudilo"	Vidyasagar	Bhuvanachandra	P. Unnikrishnan
2003	Villain	"Vaadichoopo Vedichoopo"	Vidyasagar	Bhuvanachandra	Shankar Mahadevan
2003	Tiger Harischandra Prasad	"Simhamochina"	S. A. Rajkumar	Chiravvuri Vijaykumar	SPB
2004	Lakshmi Narasimha	"Jadathoti Kodithe"	Mani Sharma	Chandrabose	SPB
2004	Puttintiki Ra Chelli	"Gopala Gopala"	S. A. Rajkumar	Sai Sri Harsha	Udit Narayan
2004	Puttintiki Ra Chelli	"Guntakallu Gumma"	S. A. Rajkumar	Surendra Krishna	Tippu
2004	Kushi Kushiga	"Chamanti Poobanti"	S. A. Rajkumar	Bhuvanachandra	Karthik, Tippu
2004	Kushi Kushiga	"Sirisiri Muvvala"	S. A. Rajkumar	Sahiti	P. Unnikrishnan, Tippu, Rakesh, Sri Vidya
2004	Naani	"Chakkera"	A. R. Rahman	Sirivennela Sitarama Sastry	SPB
2004	Samba	"Nandamuri Chandamama"	Mani Sharma	Bhuvanachandra	S. P. Charan
2004	Cheppave Chirugali	"Nannu Lalinchu"	S. A. Rajkumar	Chandrabose	
2004	Cheppave Chirugali	"Nannu Lalinchu" (duet)	S. A. Rajkumar	Chandrabose	Unni Menon
2004	Cheppave Chirugali	"Happy New Year"	S. A. Rajkumar	Chandrabose	Hariharan
2004	Mr & Mrs Sailaja Krishnamurthy	"Ammai Manasante"	Rohit Raj	Suddala Ashok Teja	
2004	Mr & Mrs Sailaja Krishnamurthy	"Oho Chandamama"	Rohit Raj	Suddala Ashok Teja	
2004	Swarabhishekam	"Kasthuri Thilakam"	Vidyasagar	Veturi	Shankar Mahadevan
2004	Suryam	"Endakalamlo"	Chakri	Chandrabose	Shankar Mahadevan
2004	Leela Mahal Centre	"Thummeda"	S. A. Rajkumar	Suddala Ashok Teja	Udit Narayan
2004	Leela Mahal Centre	"O Happy Bomma"	S. A. Rajkumar	Suddala Ashok Teja	Hariharan
2004	Yuva	"Vachinda Megham"	A. R. Rahman	Veturi	Adnan Sami
2005	Balu	"Kannu Kottina"	Mani Sharma	Sirivennela Sitarama Sastry	Udit Narayan
2005	Keelu Gurram	"Sari Sarigama"	S. A. Rajkumar	Sai Sri Harsha	Mano, Malathi
2005	Sankranti	"Chilakaa"	S. A. Rajkumar	Bhaskarabatla Ravikumar	Shankar Mahadevan
2005	Subash Chandra Bose	"Mokka Jonna Thotalo"	Mani Sharma	Chandrabose	Udit Narayan
2005	Allari Pidugu	"Mallelona Illaira"	Mani Sharma	Veturi	Karthik
2005	Mahanandi	"Kathilanti Ammayi"	Kamalakar	Veturi	Adnan Sami
2006	Devadasu	"Adigi Adagaleka"	Chakri	Chandrabose	Karthik
2006	Rajababu	"Vennela Vennela"	S. A. Rajkumar	E. S. Murthy	Hariharan
2006	Rajababu	"Nerajana"	S. A. Rajkumar	Bhuvanachandra	Udit Narayan
2006	Veerabhadra	"Boppayi Boppayi"	Mani Sharma	Chinni Charan	Karthik
2006	Evandoi Srivaru	"Aandallu"	Srikanth Deva	Veturi	Mallikarjun
2006	Evandoi Srivaru	"Ippude"	Srikanth Deva	Veturi	Karthik
2006	Astram	"Raa Chilaka"	S. A. Rajkumar	Bhaskarabhatla	Shankar Mahadevan
2006	Ashok	"Gola Gola"	Mani Sharma	Chandrabose	Ravi Varma
2006	Andala Ramudu	"Seethakoka"	S. A. Rajkumar	Ananta Sriram	Rajesh Krishnan
2006	Abaddham	"Hitler Pilla"	Vidyasagar	Chandrabose	Karthik
2007	Poramboku	"Chinnari Pavurama"	Mani Sharma	Sirivennela Sitarama Sastry	
2007	Lakshmi Kalyanam	"Bava Bava"	R. P. Patnaik	Ramajogayya Sastry	Shankar Mahadevan
2007	Munna	"Konchem Konchem Ooristhunte"	Harris Jayaraj	Bhaskarabatla	Kailash Kher
2007	Lakshyam	"Sukku Sukku"	Mani Sharma	Chandrabose	Tippu
2007	Chandamama	"Mukkapai Muddupettu"	K. M. Radha Krishnan	Sai Sri Harsha	Haricharan
2007	Vijayadasami	"Idho Oka"	Srikanth Deva	Ananta Sriram	Harish Raghavendra
2007	Gurukanth	"Ey Hayilo"	A. R. Rahman	Veturi	Hariharan, A. R. Rahman, Mohammed Aslam
2008	Sundarakanda	"Aaku Vakka"	Vidyasagar	Chandrabose	S. P. Sailaja
2008	Gamyam	"Samayama"	E. S. Murthy	Sirivennela Sitarama Sastry	
2008	Kathanayakudu	"Chaalle Chaalle"	G. V. Prakash Kumar	Bhuvanachandra	Hariharan, Baby Rajini, Baby Pooja
2008	Baladoor	"Rangu Rangu"	K. M. Radha Krishnan	Chandrabose	Tippu
2008	Gorintaku	"Rajugari Thotalona"	S. A. Rajkumar	Sirivennela Sitarama Sastry	Mano, Suneetha
2009	Mitrudu	"Jhummandi Vallanta"	Mani Sharma	Oruganti	Karthik
2009	Ninnu Kalisaka	"Andamaina Andama"	Sunil Kashyap	Ananta Sriram	Hariharan
2009	Kasko	"Krishnaveni"	Premgi Amaren	Chandrabose	Naveen Madhav

== Hindi film songs ==
Year	Film	Song	Composer(s)	Note(s)	Writer(s)	Co-artist(s)
1992	Roja	"Roja Jaaneman"(Version l)	A. R. Rahman	Dubbed	PK Mishra	S. P. Balasubrahmanyam
1992	Roja	"Roja Jaaneman"(Version ll)	A. R. Rahman	Dubbed	PK Mishra	Hariharan
1993	Chor Chor	"Dil Hai Sanam Dil"	A. R. Rahman	Dubbed	PK Mishra	
1994	Humse Hai Muqabla	"Maine Bheja Hai Sandesh"	A. R. Rahman	Dubbed	PK Mishra	
1994	Humse Hai Muqabla	"Sagar Se Milne"	A. R. Rahman	Dubbed	PK Mishra	Sunandha, Minmini
1995	Bombay	"Aankhon Mein Ummeedon"	A. R. Rahman	Dubbed	Mehboob	
1995	Tu Hi Mera Dil	"Sun Le O Janam"	A. R. Rahman	Dubbed	P. K. Mishra	
1995	Tu Hi Mera Dil	"Dil Ka Raja"	A. R. Rahman	Dubbed	P. K. Mishra	
1995	Muthu Mahraaj	"Rangeela Rangeela"	A. R. Rahman	Dubbed	P. K. Mishra	Mano
1996	Priyanka	"Yeh Jaatti Baatti"	A. R. Rahman	Dubbed	P. K. Mishra	Anuradha Sriram, G. V. Prakash
1996	Love Birds	"Na Ho Kal Jab"	A. R. Rahman	Mehboob	S. P. Balasubrahmanyam	
1997	Vishwavidhaata	"Kal Nahi Tha Woh"	A. R. Rahman		P. K. Mishra	
1997	Vishwavidhaata	"Kal Nahi Tha Woh (Sad Version)		Hariharan	P. K. Mishra	
1997	Dus	"Piya"	Shankar–Ehsaan–Loy			
1998	Kabhi Na Kabhi	"Tum Ho Meri Nigahon Mein"	A. R. Rahman		Javed Akhtar	Hariharan
1998	Earth (also Known as 1947: Earth)	"Ishwar Allah"	A. R. Rahman		Javed Akhtar	Anuradha Sriram
1998	Earth (also Known as 1947: Earth)	"Yeh Jo Zindagi Hai"	A. R. Rahman			Sukhwinder Singh, Srinivas
1999	Taal	"Ishq Bina"		Anand Bakshi	Sonu Nigam, Anuradha Sriram, A. R. Rahman	
2000	Pukar	"Hai Jaana"		Majrooh		
2001	Little John	"Aaj Mai Gaaon"(Version ll)	Pravin Mani		Javed Akhtar	
2004	Hulchul	"Rafta Rafta"	Vidyasagar		Sameer	Udit Narayan
2005	Bhagmati: The Queen of Fortunes	"Suraj Ki Aag Mein"	Vishal Bharadwaj			Roop Kumar Rathod

== Kannada film songs ==
Year	Film	Song	Composer(s)	Writer(s)	Co-artist(s)
1989	Madhuri	"Hadinentu Varshadinda"	Sangeetha Rajan	Doddarange Gowda	
1989	Madhuri	"Hani Hani Jorige"	Sangeetha Rajan	Doddarange Gowda	S. P. Balasubrahmanyam
1989	Madhuri	"Stranger Stranger"	Sangeetha Rajan	Doddarange Gowda	S. P. Balasubrahmanyam
1990	Poli Kitti	"Muddina Geleya Baaro"	Sangeetha Rajan	Doddarange Gowda	
1990	Poli Kitti	"Jedana Baleyanthe"	Sangeetha Rajan	Doddarange Gowda	
1990	Poli Kitti	"Sangathiye Elliruve"	Sangeetha Rajan	Doddarange Gowda	
1994	Chinna	"Welcome Welcome"	Hamsalekha		SPB, Mangala Anjan
2000	Yen Hudugiro Yaaking Aadthiro	"Minchu Kanna Minchu"	Vidyasagar	K. Kalyan	K. S. Chithra, Sangeetha Sajith
2000	Yen Hudugiro Yaaking Aadthiro	"Oh Gelathi Muddu Gelathi"	Vidyasagar	K. Kalyan	K. S. Chithra, Sangeetha Sajith
2000	Yen Hudugiro Yaaking Aadthiro	"Hunnime Banna Chenna"	Vidyasagar	K. Kalyan	K. S. Chithra
2000	Yen Hudugiro Yaaking Aadthiro	"Doora Bettada Thudiyalli	Vidyasagar	K. Kalyan	L. N. Shastri
2001	Hoo Anthiya Uhoo Anthiya	"Chandada Chandine"	Karthik Raja	Doddarange Gowda	Srinivas
2003	Raja Narasimha	"Maharaja Rajanu Ivanu"	Deva	K. Kalyan	
2003	Raja Narasimha	"O Madhuvanthi"	Deva	K. Kalyan	SPB
2003	Vijaya Dashami	"Foreign Heccho"	Deva	Doddarange Gowda	SPB
2003	Chandra Chakori	"Jigari Dost"	S. A. Rajkumar	S. Narayan	Mano, Manikka Vinayagam
2004	Kanchana Ganga	"Prema Prema"	S. A. Rajkumar	R. N. Jayagopal	
2005	Udees	"Raagave"	Venkat-Narayan	Thangali Nagaraj	Harish Raghavendra
2007	Sajni	"Ondu Sulladaru"	A. R. Rahman	J. M. Prahlad	Srinivas
2008	Nannusire	"Munjane Suryananne"	Premji Amaran	Kaviraj	
2009	Olave Vismaya	"Gama Gamavo"	Veer Samarth	V. Nagendra Prasad	Srinivas
2009	Chickpete Sachagalu	"Ondondu Saari"	S. Narayan		Srinivas
2010	Zamana	"Bandalu Bandalu Mandakini"	Karthik Raja	Tushar Ranganath	MNM
2011	Uyyale	"Hagalu Ninnade"	DJ Ricky	Jayanth Kaikini	Udit Narayan
2011	Sogasugara	"Chandiranillada"	Rajesh Ramanath	K. Kalyan	Solo
2011	Sogasugara	"Olave Ninna Olavina Mele"	Rajesh Ramanath	K. Kalyan	S. P. Balasubrahmanyam
2012	18th Cross	"Priyasakhi Preethise"	Arjun Janya	Shivananje Gowda	Srinivas

== Television series songs ==
Year	Series	Song	Composer(s)	language
1997	Mangai	"Mangai Mangai"	Chandrabose	Tamil
2004	Megham	"Megham"		Malayalam
2004	Kavyanjali	"Ethra Enangi"		Malayalam
2005	Orma	"Shyamasandhye"	Ramesh Narayan	Malayalam
2006	Mounam	"Mounanayi"		Malayalam
2007	Kalyani	"Thazhvaram poothu"		Malayalam
2008	Manasariyathe	"Onne Onne"	Rinil	Malayalam
2011	Amma	"Amminja Palin"	S. P. Venkatesh	Malayalam
