= Dost (2004 film) =

2004 Indian Telugu language film

- The poster of Dost film
- Directed by: Muppalaneni Shiva
- Produced by: N. Radhakrishna Reddy
- Starring: Siva Balaji; Karthik; Neha Bamb; Preethi Mehra
- Music by: Koti
- Release date: 30 April 2004
- Country: India
- Language: Telugu

Dost (transl. Friend) is a 2004 Indian Telugu language film directed by Muppalaneni Siva. Siva Balaji, newcomer Karthik, Neha Bamb and newcomer Preethi Mehra starred with K. Viswanath in a supporting role. The music was composed by Koti. The film was a remake of 2002 Malayalam film Nammal.

== Plot ==
Snehalatha (Suhasini) takes charge as the principal of a college where Shyam (Karthik) and Sivan (Siva Balaji) are the heroes. Shyam and Sivan are fun-filled, naughty characters. Meghamala (Neha Bamb) is teased and ragged by the duo, who happens to be the daughter of a friend of the principal. Megha complains and Snehalatha takes action against Shyam and Shivan. She discovers to her surprise that Shyam and Shivan are orphans, hardworking and their guardian is a teacher (K. Viswanath). But the real twist happens when Snehalatha finds out that one of them is her son.

== Cast ==
- Siva Balaji as Siva
- Karthik as Shyam
- Neha Bamb as Megha
- Preethi Mehra as Malli
- K. Viswanath as Sathyamoorthy
- Suhasini as Snehalatha
- Ali
- Brahmanandam as A.V.Rao
- Hema
- Kallu Chidambaram
- Lakshmipati as attender Lakshmipati
- M. S. Narayana
- Raghu Babu
- Raghunatha Reddy
- Ananth Babu
- Shankar Melkote
- Tanikella Bharani
- Venu Madhav as Balu
- Srikar Babu as Vicky
- Ammalu
- Apoorva
- Kranthi
- Mohana
- Sarika Ramachandra Rao
- Shravan Kumar
- Swathi
- Master Banti

== Production ==
Dialogue writer Diwakar Babu's son Srikar Babu made his film debut in a negative role.

== Soundtrack ==
The music was composed by Koti. The audio launch function was held on 23 January 2004 at Film Nagar Cultural Club, Hyderabad. The songs "Aa Chupe", "Jeevitham Oka", "Sorry Cheppi" are based on "Ennamme", "Sooryane" and "En Karalil" from Nammal, respectively. The song "Vei Vei Vaatei" is loosely based on the Tamil song "Mai Mai Kanmai" composed by S. P. Balasubrahmanyam for Tamil film Thaiyalkaran.

No.	Title	Lyrics	Singer(s)	Length
1.	"Aa Chupe Suprabhatham"	Saamavedam	Vijay Yesudas	3:54
2.	"Eppa Saara Kottaro"	Bhuvana Chandra	Karthik, K. S. Chithra, Hanumanta Rao	4:45
3.	"Jeevitham Oka Aatara"	Bhuvana Chandra	Karthik, Tippu	4:19
4.	"Malli Malli"	Muppalaneni Shiva	Udit Narayan, Chitra	4:16
5.	"Sorry Cheppi"	Muppalaneni Shiva	Karthik, Tippu	3:52
6.	"Vei Vei Vaatei"	Muppalaneni Shiva	Udit Narayan, Swarnalatha	3:42

== Reception ==
Naga of Telugucinema.com wrote "The film might not make as great an impact as the original did".
