= Manja Manthrangal =

Manja Mandarangal
- Directed by: A. Chandrasekharan
- Written by: P. Surendran; Chandrasekharan (dialogues)
- Screenplay by: Chandrasekharan
- Starring: Jayabharathi; Nedumudi Venu
- Cinematography: Divakara Menon
- Edited by: K. Rajagopal
- Music by: Jerry Amaldev
- Production company: Nagarika Productions
- Distributed by: Nagarika Productions
- Release date: 13 March 1987
- Country: India
- Language: Malayalam

Manja Manthrangal is a 1987 Indian Malayalam-language drama film, directed by A. Chandrasekharan. The film stars Mukesh, Rohini, Nedumudi Venu, Jayabharathi and Thilakan in the lead roles. The film has musical score by Jerry Amaldev.

== Plot ==
Isaac, a doctor, is in search of his real parents. He is shocked to find out his mother is his neighbour Sara Thomas, and that he was abandoned in an orphanage.

== Cast ==
- Mukesh as Issac
- Rohini as Gladia
- Jayabharathi as Teacher Sara Thomas
- Thilakan as Mathew Paul
- Nedumudi Venu as Professor Varma
- Mala Aravindan as Raghavan
- Sabitha Anand as Lusy
- Sathaar as Thomas
- Jagannatha Varma as Gladia's father
- Valsala Menon as Issac's mother

== Soundtrack ==
The music was composed by Jerry Amaldev and the lyrics were written by M. D. Rajendran.

No.	Song	Singers	Lyrics	Length (m:ss)
1	"O Karmukile"	K. S. Chithra	M. D. Rajendran	
