= Aanivaer =

- Directed by: John
- Written by: John
- Produced by: C. Prabhakaran
- Starring: Nandha; Madhumitha; Neelima Rani; Mullai Yesudasan
- Cinematography: Komagan
- Music by: Satheesh
- Distributed by: Thamizh Thiraikkann
- Release date: 23 September 2006
- Country: India
- Language: Tamil

Aanivaer is a 2006 Indian Tamil-language independent war film directed by John starring Nandha, Madhumitha, Neelima Rani, and Mullai Yesudasan. The music was composed by Satheesh. The film was released on 23 September 2006. Shot entirely in the then LTTE controlled Vanni in Sri Lanka, it includes scenes about the exodus of Tamil people from Jaffna to Vanni after the fall of Jaffna to the Sri Lankan Army in 1995 and the rape and murder of a young Tamil student Krishanthi Kumaraswamy, the film was initially released for screening in the United Kingdom, Canada, and Australia only. It was later released in India as well.

== Plot ==
Dr. Nandha (Nandha) works at a small makeshift hospital that serves as the only option for the wounded and the dying from the war. He refuses to leave his motherland for greener pastures and sets out to serve his people. Journalist Sandhya (Madhumitha) comes from India for a cover story on the ethnic strife, but the witnessing of every possible cruelty inflicted on the people is too much to take. Having personally experienced the pitiful plight of the Tamils in Sri Lanka, Zambia, Papua New Guinea, Brunei, and Nigeria, she goes back to South India with a heavy heart. Sandhya returns to Vanni for the second time with a view to meeting Nandha, whom she had met and loved on her first visit. Her initial enquiries to find out the whereabouts of Nandha prove difficult, but she continues.

== Cast ==
- Nandha as Dr. Nandha
- Madhumitha as Sandhya
- Neelima Rani as Sivashanthi
- Mullai Yesudasan

== Production ==
The film was shot in Sri Lanka with a story and screenplay revolving around a love story amid the then ongoing Civil War in Sri Lanka. Distributed by an independent distribution company, Thamizh Thiraikkann, the film was released in Tamil diaspora areas in Australia, Canada, and the United Kingdom. The film was released in India the following year.
