= John Mahendran =

Indian film director

- Other name: John Roshan
- Occupation: Director
- Years active: 2002 - present
- Parent: Mahendran

John Mahendran, credited as John, is an Indian film director and screenwriter who has worked on Tamil and Telugu and language films. John is the son of noted Tamil film maker Mahendran.

== Career ==
Reports in July 1997 suggested that John was set to direct a film under Mani Ratnam's production house with Manoj Bharathiraja in the lead role, though the project failed to materialize. John then made his directorial debut with the Telugu romantic drama, Premichedi Endukamma (1999) and also directed Neetho (2002) starring newcomers Prakash Kovelamudi and Mahek Chahal, though the film performed poorly at the box office. He later adapted and remade the latter film in Tamil as Sachein (2005) with Vijay, Genelia D'Souza and Bipasha Basu in the lead roles. John later worked on the independent Tamil film Aanivaer (2006), which told the story of a doctor caught up in the Sri Lankan civil war. The film won positive reviews and had a limited release across regions with Tamil diaspora. John subsequently began work and finished the first schedule for Urumi, which starred Sibiraj and Aparna Pillai, but the film was later shelved. He then began pre-production on a film starring Vishal and also a project titled Saravedi, starring Jeevan but both the projects never materialized.

John began work on a political comedy film titled Thallaippu Seidhigal in 2011 with Nakul and Aindrita Ray in the lead, and although the team had a photoshoot and later went through a title change, with a new title of Sadugudu, the project was shelved. In the early 2010s, John has worked on the script of Settai (2013) by helping director Kannan re-work the script of Hindi film Delhi Belly and on writing dialogues for Ambikapathy, the dubbed Tamil version of Raanjhanaa (2013). Subsequently he worked as a writer on film including Kaashmora (2016) and Motta Siva Ketta Siva (2017), while working as a screenplay and dialogue writing teacher at the Bofta Film Institute based in Chennai.

In 2022, he wrote for the Tamil movie Visithiran, the official remake of Malayalam movie Joseph directed by M. Padmakumar.

== Filmography ==
=== Director ===
| Year | Film | Language | Notes |
|---|---|---|---|
| 1999 | Preminchedi Endukamma | Telugu | credited as John |
| 2002 | Neetho | Telugu | credited as John |
| 2005 | Sachein | Tamil | credited as John |
| 2007 | Aanivaer | Tamil | credited as John |

=== Actor ===
| Year | Film | Role |
|---|---|---|
| 2022 | Raangi | Krishnamurthy |
| 2023 | Raththam | Inspector Vimal Raj |
| 2026 | Idhayam Murali | Chief Minister |

=== Writer ===
- All films are in Tamil including dubs. He has translated other language films into Tamil.

| Year | Film | Screenplay | Dialogues | Notes |
|---|---|---|---|---|
| 2013 | Settai | Yes | Yes | |
| 2013 | Ambikapathy | No | Translated | |
| 2013 | Athiradi Vettai | No | Translated | |
| 2017 | Motta Shiva Ketta Shiva | No | Yes | |
| 2018 | Kashmora | No | Yes | |
| 2020 | Darbar | No | Yes | |
| 2021 | Kabadadaari | No | Yes | |
| 2022 | Visithiran | No | Yes | |
| 2022 | Vikrant Rona | No | Translated | |
| 2023 | Kondraal Paavam | No | Yes | |
| 2023 | Agent | No | Translated | |
| 2025 | Baby and Baby | No | No | Story discussion |
