= Pagale Vennela =

- Directed by: C. V. Reddy
- Written by: Marudhuri Raja (dialogues)
- Starring: Siva Balaji; Mythili
- Edited by: Kola Bhaskar
- Music by: Vandemataram Srinivas
- Release date: 26 January 2007
- Country: India
- Language: Telugu

Pagale Vennela (transl. The moon is shining brightly) is a 2007 Indian Telugu-language romantic comedy film directed by C. V. Reddy and starring Siva Balaji and Mythili. The film was released on 26 January 2007.

== Cast ==
- Siva Balaji as Balu
- Mythili as Swapna
- Jayaprakash Reddy as SI
- Nagineedu as ACP
- Sunil
- Dharmavarapu Subramanyam
- Brahmanandam
- Kovai Sarala as Sarala
- Rajitha as Mahila Mandal President
- Tanikella Bharani as Swapna's father
- Sana as Swapna's mother
- Raghu Babu as Bosubabu
- Mallikarjuna Rao
- M. S. Narayana
- Mada Venkateswara Rao
- Venu Madhav
- Kondavalasa Lakshmana Rao
- Apoorva

== Soundtrack ==
The music was composed by Vandemataram Srinivas. The audio release function took place on 12 September 2006 at Prasad Labs Preview Theatre in Hyderabad.

Track listing
No.	Title	Lyrics	Singer(s)	Length
1.	"Gum Gum Guma"	Suddala Ashok Teja	Naveen, Bindu	4:26
2.	"Nenu Guntur Gongura Gampa"	Bheems Ceciroleo	Simha, Malathi	4:23
3.	"Chandamama Chandamama"	Saikrishna	N. C. Karunya, Chaitra H. G.	5:02
4.	"Madhilo Madhu Sangeetam"	Veturi Sundararama Murthy	Nihal, Sahithi	4:45
5.	"Alluda" (Poem)	Suddala Ashok Teja	Gummadi Gopalakrishna	1:54
6.	"Abham Subham" (Poem)	Suddala Ashok Teja	Gummadi Gopalakrishna	1:36
Total length:				22:06
