= Siva Balaji =

Indian actor, television personality and film producer

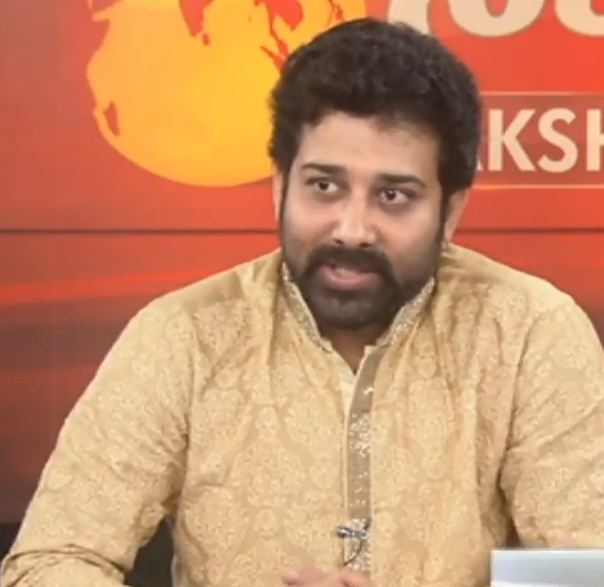
- Siva on a television interview in 2017
- Born: Siva Balaji Manohar; 14 October 1980 (age 45); Chennai, Tamil Nadu, India
- Occupations: Actor, television personality
- Years active: 2003–present
- Organization: Movie Artists Association
- Spouse(s): Madhumitha (m.2009–present)
- Children: 2

Siva Balaji (born as Siva Balaji Manohar on 14 October 1980) is an Indian actor and television personality, better known for his works in the Telugu film industry. He also made an appearance on the Telugu version of the reality show Bigg Boss, which airs on Star Maa.

He is currently serving as the treasurer of the Movie Artists Association since 2021.

== Early life and family ==
Siva Balaji was born and brought up in Chennai, Tamil Nadu. He attended Karthikeyan Matriculation Higher Secondary School. He has a younger sister Gayathri Lingam who is married to Yathendra Lingam, and younger brothers Prashanth Balaji and Krishna Sai. In 2009, he married actress Madhumitha, whom he paired in the film Englishkaran. They both have two sons.

== Career ==
Balaji appeared in his first film Idi Maa Ashokgadi Love Story, followed by a role in Ela Cheppanu and the lead role in Dost. He got major break in the film Arya (2004) directed by Sukumar. A reviewer said, "Siva is good as adamant, at times confused, lover. He generated comedy in a few scenes where he shows his frustration." Reviewer from Sify.com wrote " Siva as Ajay is very promising." It was followed by Sankranti, in which he shared screen space with actors Daggubati Venkatesh and Srikanth.

Balaji appeared in Kumkuma (2005). He also appeared in the Tamil film Englishkaran in the same year. He made five films in 2006: Pothe Poni, Kokila, Sarada Saradaga, Aganthakudu and Annavaram.

== Filmography ==
Year	Film	Role	Notes
2003	Idi Maa Ashokgadi Love Story	Ashok	Film Debut
2003	Ela Cheppanu	Amar Varma	
2004	Dost	Siva	
2004	Arya	Ajay	
2005	Sankranti	Chinna	
2005	Kumkuma	Karthik	
2005	Englishkaran	Bala	Tamil film
2006	Pote Poni	Chaitanya	
2006	Kokila	Abhi	
2006	Sarada Saradaga	Prem	
2006	Aagantakudu	Anil	
2006	Annavaram	Varam's husband	
2007	Pagale Vennela	Balu	
2007	Podarillu		
2007	Chandamama	Dorababu	
2008	Target	ACP Bose	
2009	Mast	Balaji	
2010	Shambo Shiva Shambo	Chandru	
2013	Jagamemaaya		
2015	Janda Pai Kapiraju	Gopi	
2015	Lion		Cameo appearance
2017	Katamarayudu	Sivarayudu	
2017	Snehamera Jeevitham	Mohan	Also producer
2022	10th Class Diaries		
2022	Shaakuntalam	Maadavya	
2023	Sindhooram	Singanna	
2023	Calling Sahasra	Ravi	
2025	Kannappa	Kumara Deva Sastry	

- All films are in Telugu, except Englishkaaran.

== Television ==
Year	Title	Role	Channel	Notes
2017	Bigg Boss 1	Contestant	Star Maa	Winner- On Day 70
2017	Neethone Dance	Guest	Star Maa	
2022	Recce	Chalapathi	ZEE5	
