= Mochanam =

- Directed by: Thoppil Bhasi
- Written by: Kakkanadan; Thoppil Bhasi (dialogues)
- Screenplay by: Thoppil Bhasi
- Produced by: P. Stanley
- Starring: Jayan; Meena; Jayabharathi; Unnimary
- Edited by: G. Venkittaraman
- Music by: G. Devarajan
- Release date: 30 November 1978
- Country: India
- Language: Malayalam

Mochanam is a 1978 Indian Malayalam film, directed by Thoppil Bhasi and produced by P. Stanley. The film stars Jayan, Sukumari, Jayabharathi and Unnimary in the lead roles. The film has musical score by G. Devarajan.

== Plot ==
Balachandran is in love with his employee Sreedevi. His mother would prefer that he marry his cousin Meera. However, when he proposes to Sreedevi, she reveals that she's happily engaged to be married to Soman. She resigns from her job due to office gossip. Sreedevi's ends up regretting her marriage when she realizes that her husband had been having an affair for a long time with his domestic help Janu. A distraught Sreedevi approaches Balachandran and he gives her job back. She confesses to be ready for his proposal. But Balachandran has now become engaged to Meera and can't bring himself to hurt her by breaking his engagement. Meera realizes that Balachandran and Sreedevi are in love and is ready to sacrifice her love. She meets Sreedevi as Balachandran's cousin and persuades her to visit Balachandran and his mother. When Sreedevi realises that Meera is in fact Balachandran's fiancé, she leaves his home to spare everyone. A distraught Balachandran discovers her body at the same beach where they used to meet regularly, and walks to the sea carrying her.

== Cast ==
- Jayan as Balachandran
- Sukumaran as Soman
- Sukumari as Saraswathi
- Jayabharathi as Sreedevi
- Unnimary as Meera
- Bhavani as Jaanu
- Mallika Sukumaran as Karthyayani
- Oduvil Unnikrishnan as Vasu Pilla
- Thodupuzha Vasanthy as Reetha
- Sankaradi as Sankara Pilla
- Jagathy Sreekumar as Ayyappan
- Thoppil Krishnapilla as Thoma

== Soundtrack ==
The music was composed by G. Devarajan and the lyrics were written by MD Rajendran.

No.	Song	Singers	Lyrics	Length (m:ss)
1	"Aadyavasantham Pole"	P. Madhuri	M. D. Rajendran	
2	"Malarambanezhuthiya"	P. Jayachandhran	M. D. Rajendran	
3	"Rahasyam Ithu Rahasyam"	P. Susheela	M. D. Rajendran	
4	"Malarambanarinjilla Madhumasa Marinjilla"	S.Janaki	M. D. Rajendran	
