= Movie Artists Association =

Cinema union in India

Movie Artists Association (MAA)
- Formation: 4 October 1993; 32 years ago
- Type: non-profit Organization
- Headquarters: Andhra Pradesh Film Chamber of Commerce, Film Nagar
- Location: Hyderabad, Telangana, India
- Members: 900+
- Official language: Telugu
- President: Vishnu Manchu
- General secretary: Raghu Babu
- Vice president: Madala Ravi
- Treasurer: Siva Balaji
- Website: maa.asia

The Movie Artists Association (MAA) is a trade union that represents over 900 principal and background performers working in Telugu cinema. It was started on 4 October 1993 by Akkineni Nageswara Rao, Krishnam Raju, Krishna, Murali Mohan and other senior artists. Chiranjeevi was the maiden president of the MAA.

The stated objectives of the MAA include resolving issues related to artists, arbitration of disputes between producers and artists, and implementing measures related to the welfare of its members. In its early days, Akkineni Nageswara Rao, Krishnam Raju, Krishna, Murali Mohan acted as advisors. Before the full-fledged formation of the MAA, its functions were operated from the residence of Murali Mohan for a few months.

As of April 2024, the MAA is currently administered from the Andhra Pradesh Film Chamber of Commerce Building located at Film Nagar, Hyderabad, Telangana, and the current president is Vishnu Manchu.

== History ==
The Telugu film industry has a 30-year history associated with the welfare of its artists. The Movie Artists Association was established in 1993, with 100 members, which will increase to 1000 by 2024.

Movie Artists Association, was formed with the objective of providing support and welfare to the artists and technicians working in the film industry. It was founded with the goal of addressing issues such as payment disputes, welfare, and representation of the artists in the industry. The MAA's elections in October 2021 drew attention due to various controversies surrounding it. Vishnu Manchu was elected the president in the elections. He and his team again won the April 2024 elections.

On 23 March 2024, MAA President Vishnu Manchu hosted an event at Park Hyatt Hyderabad, marking 90 years of Telugu cinema. The event, 'Navatīhi Utsavam', highlighted Telugu cinema's global impact and Indo-Malaysian relations. Notable attendees included MAA President Vishnu Manchu, Vice President Madala Ravi, Treasurer Siva Balaji, Advisor Datuk P Kamalanathan, and Razaidi Abdul Rahim from Tourism Malaysia, emphasizing the event's significance for both industries. Scheduled for July 2024 in Malaysia, the event aims to raise funds for MAA's charitable causes.

== Governing body ==
The governing body of the association is responsible for overseeing its activities and serving its members. It holds office for a term of two years. It comprises several members, including a president, two vice presidents, a general secretary, a joint secretary, a treasurer, and other executive committee members. The president is the head of the governing body and acts as its spokesperson, while the vice presidents support the president in carrying out their duties. The general secretary oversees the administrative tasks of the association, while the joint secretary assists them. The treasurer manages the association's finances and ensures its financial stability.

- Advisory council members: Mohan Babu, Nandamuri Balakrishna, Giri Babu, P. Shiva Krishna, Jaya Prada, Paruchuri Gopala Krishna
- Office bearers: Vishnu Manchu (president), Dr. Madala Ravi (vice president), Prudhvi Raj (vice president), Babu Mohan (executive vice president), Raghu Babu (general secretary), Siva Balaji (treasurer), Gautam Raju (joint secretary), Karate Kalyani (joint secretary)
- Women Welfare: Vishnu Manchu (committee chairman), Sunitha Krishnan (honorary advisor), Lakshmi Manchu, Swapna Dutt (TFPC), Tanikella Bharani, Smt. Jaysheela G

== Administrative staff ==
To become a member of the MAA Association, an actor must have acted in more than five films. As of 2021, the association boasts over 900 active members.

Duration	President	General secretary	Treasurer	Ref.
1993–1995	Chiranjeevi	Murali Mohan	Mohan Babu	
1995–1997	Krishna	Murali Mohan	Not Available	
1997–1999	Krishna	Murali Mohan	Nagarjuna	
1999–2000	Murali Mohan	AVS	Venkatesh	
2000–2002	Nagarjuna	AVS	Giri Babu	
2002–2004	Murali Mohan	Mallikarjuna Rao	Tanikella Bharani	
2004–2006	Mohan Babu	Sivaji Raja and Mallikarjuna Rao	Paruchuri brothers	
2006–2008	Nagendra Babu	Mallikarjuna Rao and Vinod Bala	Paruchuri brothers	
2008–2010	Murali Mohan	Ahuti Prasad	Kota Srinivasa Rao	
2010–2012	Murali Mohan	Ahuti Prasad	Sivaji Raja	
2013–2015	Murali Mohan	Ali	Sivaji Raja	
2015–2017	Rajendra Prasad	Sivaji Raja	Paruchuri brothers	
2017–2019	Sivaji Raja	Naresh	Paruchuri brothers	
2019–2021	Naresh	Jeevitha	Rajeev Kanakala	
2021–2024	Vishnu Manchu	Raghu Babu	Siva Balaji	
2024–present	Vishnu Manchu	Raghu Babu	Siva Balaji	
