= Englishkaran =

- DVD cover
- Directed by: Sakthi Chidambaram
- Produced by: Amudha Durairaj
- Starring: Sathyaraj; Namitha; Madhumitha
- Cinematography: Suresh Devan
- Edited by: V. T. Vijayan
- Music by: Deva
- Production companies: Seven Hills Film Factory; Deivanai Movies
- Release date: 24 June 2005
- Country: India
- Language: Tamil

Englishkaran (transl. Englishman) is a 2005 Indian Tamil-language comedy film directed by Sakthi Chidambaram. It stars Sathyaraj, Namitha and Madhumitha, while Siva Balaji, Vadivelu and Santhanam play supporting roles.

== Plot ==
Thamizharasan, a reformist, arrives in a village and takes up residence at Dhandapani's guest house. Despite initial reservations, Dhandapani is drawn to Thamizharasan's candid admission of past mistakes. Dhandapani's daughter, Sandhya, aspires to become a singer, but her father's patriarchal views and adherence to traditional ideologies hinder her ambitions. In college, Bala harbors an unrequited love for Sandhya. Meanwhile, the son of former MLA Angalaparameswari misbehaves with Sandhya at a theater, prompting her to defend herself by beating him with her slippers. Thamizharasan joins the college and begins to pursue Sandhya, but she evades him by sharing a bike ride with Bala. As events unfold, Sandhya, who dislikes Thamizharasan, develops feelings for Bala and proposes to him publicly, witnessed by Dhandapani and Thamizharasan.

Thamizharasan, who had secretly recorded Sandhya singing solo, sends the CD to renowned musician Deva. Impressed by Sandhya's talent, Deva visits Dhandapani to persuade him to allow Sandhya to pursue a singing career. However, Dhandapani refuses categorically. Angalaparameswari, with a hidden agenda, presents herself as a demure woman and requests Dhandapani's permission to marry Sandhya to her son, seeking revenge for the public humiliation her son suffered at Sandhya's hands. Dhandapani agrees, hoping to use Angalaparameswari's influence to rid himself of Thamizharasan. Meanwhile, Theeppori Thirumugam, Sandhya's maternal uncle, devises various plans to evict Thamizharasan, but they all fail, and he himself gets caught. As the story unfolds, Bala and Sandhya elope to Chennai with Thamizharasan's clandestine assistance. Unaware of Thamizharasan's involvement, Sandhya confronts Bala upon discovering the truth.

In a flashback, it is revealed that Thamizharasan is, in fact, Sandhya's brother-in-law, married to her elder sister Maheswari, an aspiring athlete. Despite initial concerns that marriage would hinder her athletic pursuits, Maheswari finds support in Thamizharasan, who encourages her to chase her dreams. Sandhya, however, mistakenly perceives Thamizharasan as a male chauvinist, much like her father. Meanwhile, Thamizharasan's mother, bound by traditional values, expects a grandchild and is unaware of Maheswari's passion for sports. Upon discovering Maheswari's athletic ambitions, she orchestrates a plan to sabotage Maheswari's sports career. She manipulates Maheswari into falling down the stairs, then conspires with a doctor to deceive Thamizharasan into believing that Maheswari's backbone is dislocated, rendering her unable to continue her athletic pursuits. Maheswari, however, overhears the conversation. Devastated by the realization that her dreams have been crushed, Maheswari consumes oleander seeds, poisoning herself. Thamizharasan, upon learning of his mother's scheme, discovers that Maheswari's injury is merely a sprain. As she lies dying in Thamizharasan's arms, she extracts a promise from him to support her sister Sandhya's singing aspirations.

With the truth finally revealed, Sandhya gains a newfound understanding and respect for Thamizharasan's selfless actions. Meanwhile, following Angalaparameswari's sudden demise, her son travels to Chennai, determined to fulfill his mother's wish of marrying Sandhya. He attacks Bala and kidnaps Sandhya, but Thamizharasan intervenes, fighting off the goons. Despite being severely injured, Thamizharasan's timely intervention ensures Sandhya's safe escape. Sandhya successfully arrives at Deva's studio and records her first song, an opportunity arranged by Thamizharasan. Thamizharasan, meanwhile, recovers from his injuries.

Later, Thamizharasan witnesses a young boy being beaten by his father for pursuing his passion. Moved by the boy's plight, Thamizharasan takes the boy under his wing, determined to help him fulfill his dreams.

== Cast ==
- Sathyaraj as Thamizharasan
- Namitha as Maheswari
- Vadivelu as "Theeppori" Thirumugam
- Madhumitha as Sandhya
- Siva Balaji as Bala
- Santhanam as Bala's friend
- Jaya Murali as Maheshwari and Sandhya's mother
- Sathyapriya as Thamizharasan's mother (Guest Appearance)
- Aishwarya as Angalaparameswari
- Kadhal Dhandapani as Maheshwari and Sandhya's father
- K. S. G. Venkatesh as Doctor Dhamodharan
- Pawan as Angalaparameswari's son
- Singamuthu as "Neruppu" Neelamegam
- Bonda Mani as Thirumugam's friend
- Bava Lakshmanan as Thirumugam's friend
- Halwa Vasu as Thirumugam's friend
- Vijay Ganesh as Thirumugam's friend
- Krishnamoorthy as Thirumugam's friend
- Balu Anand as a villager
- Vengal Rao as a beggar
- Velmurugan as Bala's friend
- Ganeshkar as Bala's friend
- Chaplin Balu as Bala's friend
- Kili Ramachandran as Bala's friend
- Besant Ravi as Angalaparameswari's henchman
- Kovai Senthil as a priest
- Suruli Manohar as Kutty Samiyar
- Rajkrishna as Seth
- Deva as Himself (cameo appearance)

== Production ==
The film's shoot took place in Chennai for 14 days, and for another 25 days at Gobichettipalayam.

== Soundtrack ==
The soundtrack was composed by Deva and released on Bayshore.

Track listing
No.	Title	Lyrics	Singer(s)	Length
1.	"Yaaradhu Yaaradhu"	Na. Muthukumar	Shreya Ghoshal	5:50
2.	"Englishkaran"	Na. Muthukumar	Suresh Peters	5:31
3.	"Englishkaran (Film Version)"	Na. Muthukumar	Manikka Vinayagam	5:31
4.	"Nanbanae Nanbanae"	Na. Muthukumar	K. S. Chithra	5:36
5.	"Yeh Thiruda"	Na. Muthukumar	Srikanth Deva, Sunitha Sarathy	5:49
6.	"Ghajini Mohammed"	Na. Muthukumar	Karthik, Suchitra	6:10
Total length:				28:56

== Critical reception ==
Malini Mannath of Chennai Online wrote, "Let your child pursue his own ambition, don't force yours on him, says the message. But in the loosely etched script with its various issues and distractions, it's a diluted, and confused multi-message that reaches the audience". Malathi Rangarajan of The Hindu wrote that the film "has spurts of hilarity Satyaraj style. But when Shakti tries to get a little serious and sober the fun wagon derails into clichés and improbabilities".
