= Oru Swakaryam =

- VCD cover
- Directed by: Harikumar
- Written by: Hari Kumar
- Screenplay by: Hari Kumar
- Produced by: Vindhyan
- Starring: Venu Nagavally; Jalaja; Mammootty; Jagathy Sreekumar
- Cinematography: Vipin Mohan
- Edited by: G. Venkittaraman
- Music by: M. B. Sreenivasan
- Production company: Bhadra Productions
- Distributed by: Bhadra Productions
- Release date: 18 March 1983
- Country: India
- Language: Malayalam

Oru Swakaryam is a 1983 Indian Malayalam-language film, written and directed by Harikumar and produced by Vindhyan. The film stars Venu Nagavally, Jalaja, Mammootty and Jagathy Sreekumar. The film has musical score by M. B. Sreenivasan.

== Cast ==
- Venu Nagavally as Chandran
- Jalaja as Uma
- Mammootty as Usmanikka/Sayippu
- Jagathy Sreekumar as Boss
- Nedumudi Venu as Shivankuttty
- Bharath Gopi as Kaimal
- Thodupuzha Vasanthi as Vasanthy
- Nithya Ravindran as Kanakam
- Babu Namboothiri as Press Manager
- Sreenivasan as Murali
- Sukumari as Chandran's mother
- Thilakan as Chandran's father
- Ramachandran as Sethu

== Soundtrack ==
The music was composed by M. B. Sreenivasan with lyrics by M. D. Rajendran, Vayalar Ramavarma and Sugathakumari.

No.	Song	Singers	Lyrics	Length (m:ss)
1	"Aalolam Thaalolam Aalolamaadi" (F)	S. Janaki	M. D. Rajendran	
2	"Aalolam Thalolam"	K. J. Yesudas	M. D. Rajendran	
3	"Daaham Kollum" (Aare Kaanan) (Bit)	Venu Nagavally	Vayalar Ramavarma	
4	"Engane Engane"	K. J. Yesudas	M. D. Rajendran	
5	"Karutha Chirakumaay"	Venu Nagavally	Sugathakumari	
