= M. D. Rajendran =

- Born: July 5, 1952 (age 74); Ponkunnam, Kottayam, India
- Genres: Malayalam
- Occupations: Music composer, music director, lyricist, film director, scriptwriter, playback singer
- Years active: 1979–present

M. D. Rajendran is a Malayalam poet, lyricist and novelist. His father Ponkunnam Damodaran was a poet and activist. His siblings, M D Rathnamma and M D Ajayaghosh are also writers in Malayalam. He was employed with All India Radio and retired from service in 2012. He has written lyrics for nearly 40 Malayalam films. He has also composed music for a few films as well as albums. His collection of songs are published as a book titled ' Nin Thumbu Kettiyitta Churul Mudiyil' . His debut film as a lyricist was Mochanam in 1979. His famous works include Shalini Ente Koottukari composed by Devarajan and Devaragam directed by Bharathan, composed by academy award winner M M Keeravani.

== Filmography ==
- Note (D) indicates dubbing.

=== As a lyricist ===
- Mochanam (1979)
- Shalini Ente Koottukari (1980)
- Swathu (1980)
- Theekkali (1981)
- Kadhayariyathe (1981)
- Paarvathy (1981)
- Oru Swakaaryam (1983)
- Mangalam Nerunnu (1984)
- Koodum Thedi (1985)
- Adhyayam Onnumuthal (1985)
- Akalathe Ambili (1985)
- Ariyaathe (1986)
- Oru Kadha Oru Nunakkadha (1986)
- Manjamandaarangal (1987)
- Chaithram(1989)
- Ammaavanu Pattiya Amali (1989)
- Aaram Vardil Aabhyanthara Kalaham (1990)
- Aagneyam (1993)
- Saakshyam (1995)
- Devaraagam (1996)
- Anubhoothi (1997)
- Shaanthipuram Thampuraan (1997)
- Over To Delhi (1997)
- Manjeeradhwani (1998) (D) from Priyuralu (Telugu)
- Amma Ammaayiyamma (1998)
- Neelanjanam (1998)
- Manassil Oru Manjuthulli (2000)
- Praja (2001)
- Grand Mother (2002)
- Anyar (2003)
- Koottu (2004)
- The Campus (2005)
- Thaskaraveeran (2005)
- Gopaalapuraanam (2008)
- Mounam (2009)
- Black Stallion (2009)
- Pramani (2010)
- Ammanilavu (2010)
- Finals (2019)

=== As a music composer ===
- Over To Delhi (1997)
- Neelaanjanam (1998)
- Grand Mother (2002)
- Mounam (2009)
- Ammanilavu (2010)

=== As a screenplay writer, director, script writer, singer and dialogue writer ===
- Ammanilavu (2010)

== Awards ==
- 2014: Kerala Sangeetha Nataka Akademi Award
