= Neha Bamb =

Indian television actress

- Born: India
- Occupation: Actress
- Years active: 2001–2009
- Spouse(s): Rishiraj Jhaveri (m. 2007; div. 2010) Krushant Goragandhi (m. 2010)
- Children: Ivaana Goragandhi (daughter)

Neha Bamb is a former Indian actress known for her work in Telugu films and Hindi television serials. Her notable films include Dil (2003), and Athade Oka Sainyam (2004). On television, she gained popularity for portraying Mahi in Maayka and Kripa in Kaisa Ye Pyar Hai.

== Filmography ==
=== Films ===
Year	Film	Role	Languages
2001	Ishq Ho Gaya Meinu	Kuljeet Kaur	Hindi
2003	Dil	Nandini	Telugu
2004	No	Cameo appearance in song	Hindi
2004	Athade Oka Sainyam	Swathi	Telugu
2004	Dost	Megha	Telugu
2006	Bommarillu	Subbalakshmi	Telugu
2007	Punjabi Kudi	Pooja Kaur	Punjabi
2007	Dubai Seenu	Pooja	Telugu

=== Television ===
Year	Serial	Role	Channel	Notes
2005	Kaisa Ye Pyar Hai	Kripa Sharma/Kripa Angad Khanna/Tanya	Sony Entertainment Television	
2007	Maayka...Saath Zindagi Bhar Ka	Mahi Malhotra/Mahi Shabd Sareen	Zee TV	Zee Rishtey Award
2007	Gharelu Nuskey	Herself as Host	Star Plus	
2009	Naaginn Waadon Ki Agnipariksha	Naagin	Zee TV	
