= Anubhoothi =

- VCD cover
- Directed by: I. V. Sasi
- Written by: Babu Janardanan
- Screenplay by: Babu Janardanan
- Starring: Suresh Gopi; Khushbu; Jagadish; Vani Viswanath; M. R. Gopakumar; Kaveri
- Cinematography: Sreesankar
- Edited by: K. Narayanan
- Music by: Shyam
- Production company: Chakravarthini Film Corporation
- Distributed by: Chakravarthini Film Corporation
- Release date: 20 December 1997
- Country: India
- Language: Malayalam

Anubhoothi is a 1997 Indian Malayalam-language film directed by I. V. Sasi. The film stars Suresh Gopi, Khushbu, Jagadish, Vani Viswanath, M. R. Gopakumar and Kaveri in the lead roles. The film has musical score by Shyam.

== Cast ==
- Suresh Gopi as Shivankutty
- Khushbu as Uthara Thamburatti
- Jagadish as Appukuttan Nair
- Vani Viswanath as Radha Thamburatti
- M. R. Gopakumar as Valyamama
- Kaveri as Girija
- N. F. Varghese as Shankan Nair
- Suresh Nair as Tommy
- Jagathy Sreekumar as Diary Pappachi
- Rajan P. Dev as Kunjavarchan
- Mamukoya
- Mala Aravindan as Thankappan
- Priyanka as Adivaram Omana
- Maniyanpilla Raju as Constable Ambujakshan
- Tony
- Bheeman Raghu
- Sukumari
- Kalpana in Cameo Appearance
- Kozhikode Narayanan Nair
- Vijayan Peringode

== Soundtrack ==
The music was composed by Shyam and the lyrics were written by M. D. Rajendran and P. N. Vijayakumar.

| No. | Song | Singers | Lyrics | Length (m:ss) |
|---|---|---|---|---|
| 1 | "Adukkumthorum" | K. J. Yesudas | M. D. Rajendran | |
| 2 | "Anubhoothi Thazhuki" [D] | K. S. Chithra, M. G. Sreekumar | M. D. Rajendran | |
| 3 | "Anubhoothi Thazhuki" [F] | K. S. Chithra | M. D. Rajendran | |
| 4 | "Anubhoothi Thazhuki" [M] | M. G. Sreekumar | M. D. Rajendran | |
| 5 | "Mouname" [F] | Sujatha Mohan | P. N. Vijayakumar | |
| 6 | "Mouname" [M] | Biju Narayanan | P. N. Vijayakumar | |
| 7 | "Neelaanjanam" | Sujatha Mohan | M. D. Rajendran, P. N. Vijayakumar | |
| 8 | "Theyyaare" | Arundhathi, Chorus, Krishnachandran | M. D. Rajendran | |
| 9 | "Vin Deepangal Choodi" | K. S. Chithra | M. D. Rajendran | |
