= Athade Oka Sainyam =

- DVD cover
- Directed by: S. V. Krishna Reddy
- Written by: Diwakar Babu (dialogues)
- Screenplay by: S.V. Krishna Reddy
- Story by: S.V. Krishna Reddy
- Produced by: K. Atchi Reddy
- Starring: Jagapati Babu; Neha
- Cinematography: K. Ravindra Babu
- Edited by: Marthand K. Venkatesh
- Music by: S.V. Krishna Reddy
- Production company: SVK Films
- Release date: 23 January 2004
- Running time: 157 minutes
- Country: India
- Language: Telugu

Athade Oka Sainyam (transl. He's an Army) is a 2004 Telugu-language action comedy film produced by K . Atchi Reddy on SVK Films banner and directed by S. V. Krishna Reddy. Starring Jagapati Babu, Neha and music also composed by S. V. Krishna Reddy.

== Cast ==
- Jagapati Babu as Gottimukkala Sridhar "Chanti" Alias Rupay Paavla
- Neha as Swathi
- Prakash Raj as Prakash Rao
- Suman as Gottimukkala Raghava Rao, Sridhar's elder Brother
- Brahmanandam as Prakash's P.A.
- Ali as Ali, A magician
- Sunil as Sunil, the thief
- M. S. Narayana as Swathi's father
- Srinivasa Reddy as Srinivasa Reddy, an IT professional, and an ethical hacker
- Jeeva as Jeeva, Prakash Rao's friend and partner
- Seetha as Seeta, Raghava's wife
- Harsha Vardhan as Prakash's goon
- RK Mama as Prakash's goon
- Siva Reddy as Siva Reddy, a mimicry artist
- Gautam Raju as Vegetable Seller
- Allari Subhashini as Jeeva's wife
- Sameer as Ramakrishna
- Jenny
- Uttej
- Bandla Ganesh
- Siva Krishna as ACP
- Bharath Raju as Bharat
- Shraddha Nigam as Champa
- Sirisha
- Shobha Rani
- Anitha
- Master Kaushik
- Master Tanush

== Soundtrack ==
Athade Oka Sainyam

Film score by S. V. Krishna Reddy
- Released: 2004
- Genre: Soundtrack
- Length: 27:20
- Label: SOHAN Music
- Producer: S. V. Krishna Reddy

S. V. Krishna Reddy chronology
Orey Pandu (2004)	Athade Oka Sainyam (2004)	Sarada Saradaga (2005)

Music was composed by S. V. Krishna Reddy and released by SOHAN Music Company. Lyrics were written by Chandra Bose.

No.	Title	Singer(s)	Length
1.	"Naa Pata Teta Telugu"	Sunitha	5:49
2.	"August Padihedu"	SP Charan, Ravi Varma, Kousalya, Sunitha	5:28
3.	"Maa Intiki Ninnu Pilichi"	Hariharan, Sunitha	5:08
4.	"Nee Bulli Nikkaru Choosi"	Udit Narayan, Shreya Ghoshal	5:43
5.	"Yey Apparao"	Karthik, Sunitha	5:12
Total length:			27:20

== Awards ==
- Sunitha won Nandi Award for Best Female Playback Singer for the song "Naa Paata"
