= Swattu =

Swathu
- Directed by: N. Sankaran Nair
- Written by: N. Sankaran Nair; V. T. Nandakumar (dialogues)
- Screenplay by: N. Sankaran Nair
- Produced by: S. Usha Nair
- Starring: Jagathy Sreekumar; Thikkurissy Sukumaran Nair; Jayadevan; Zarina Wahab
- Cinematography: Ashok Kumar
- Edited by: Sasikumar
- Music by: G. Devarajan
- Production company: Rajakala Films
- Distributed by: Rajakala Films
- Release date: 27 September 1980
- Country: India
- Language: Malayalam

Swathu is a 1980 Indian Malayalam-language film, directed by N. Sankaran Nair and produced by S. Usha Nair. The film stars Jagathy Sreekumar, Thikkurissy Sukumaran Nair, Jayadevan and Zarina Wahab. The film has musical score by G. Devarajan.

== Cast ==
- Jagathy Sreekumar as Vikraman
- Thikkurissy Sukumaran Nair as Madhava Rao
- Jayadevan
- Zarina Wahab as Rohini
- Paul Vengola
- Madhu Malhotra as Jalaja (Madhava Rao love interest)
- Mrs. Lal
- N. Govindankutty as Podiyan Pilla
- Ravikumar as Sundhareshan
- P. R. Varalakshmi
- Kripa
- Philip Mathew
- Hariharan
- Jayachandran

== Soundtrack ==
The music was composed by G. Devarajan and the lyrics were written by M. D. Rajendran, Kavalam Narayana Panicker.

No.	Song	Singers	Lyrics	Length (m:ss)
1	"Janma Janmaanthara"	P. Madhuri, Hariharan	M. D. Rajendran	
2	"Krishnaa Virahini"	P. Madhuri	Kavalam Narayana Panicker	
3	"Muthinu Vendi"	K. J. Yesudas	Kavalam Narayana Panicker	
4	"Om Om Maayaamaalavagowla"	K. J. Yesudas	M. D. Rajendran	
5	"Praseethame" (Bit)	Hariharan		
