= Kumkuma (film) =

- DVD cover
- Directed by: Jyothindranath Vemuri
- Produced by: Beeram Madhusudhan Reddy
- Starring: Seema; Siva Balaji; Jayant
- Cinematography: Mohanchand
- Music by: Ghantadi Krishna
- Production company: Yaswanthi Art Movies
- Release date: 13 May 2005
- Country: India
- Language: Telugu

Kumkuma is a 2005 Indian Telugu-language family drama film directed by Jyothindranath Vemuri and starring Seema (lead debut), Siva Balaji and newcomer Jayant.

== Cast ==
- Seema as Madhuri
- Siva Balaji as Karthik
- Jayant as Vamsi
- Ranganath as Jayant's father

== Soundtrack ==
The music is composed by Ghantadi Krishna.

== Reception ==
B. Anuradha of Rediff.com said that "However, he [Vemuri] deserves some credit -- for attempting a female-centric film in the male-dominated Telegu film industry". Jeevi of Idlebrain.com opined that "On a whole, Kunkuma is a boring and sluggish flick".
