= Theekkali =

- Directed by: J. Sasikumar
- Written by: Pappanamkodu Lakshmanan
- Screenplay by: Pappanamkodu Lakshmanan
- Produced by: P. Stanley
- Starring: Prem Nazir; Jayabharathi; Adoor Bhasi; Sankaradi
- Music by: G. Devarajan
- Production company: Stanley P.
- Distributed by: Stanley P.
- Release date: 3 March 1981
- Country: India
- Language: Malayalam

Theekkali is a 1981 Indian Malayalam-language film directed by J. Sasikumar and produced by P. Stanley. It is inspired by the 1962 film China Town. The film stars Prem Nazir, Jayabharathi, Adoor Bhasi and Sankaradi in the lead roles. The film has musical score by G. Devarajan.

== Cast ==
- Prem Nazir
- Jayabharathi
- Adoor Bhasi
- Sankaradi
- Shubha
- Sreelatha Namboothiri
- K. P. Ummer
- Meena
- Sudheer

== Soundtrack ==
The music was composed by G. Devarajan and the lyrics were written by M. D. Rajendran and G. Devarajan.

No.	Song	Singers	Lyrics	Length (m:ss)
1	"Aayiram Raavinte Chiraku"	K. J. Yesudas, P. Madhuri	M. D. Rajendran	
2	"Kulirala Thulli Thulli"	P. Madhuri	M. D. Rajendran	
3	"Mazhayo Manjo"	P. Jayachandran, P. Madhuri	M. D. Rajendran	
4	"Vattaatha Snehathin"	K. J. Yesudas	G. Devarajan	
