= Madhumitha =

Indian actress

- Born: Swapna Madhuri; Kavali, Andhra Pradesh, India
- Other name: Madhu
- Occupation: Actress
- Years active: 2002–present
- Spouse: Siva Balaji (m. 2009)
- Children: 2

Madhumitha (born Swapna Madhuri) is an Indian actress who appears in Telugu and Tamil films.

== Career ==
Madhumitha started her acting career under her birth name Swapna Madhuri with the 2002 Telugu film Sandade Sandadi (2002) doing a pivotal supporting role. She continued playing supporting roles in a couple of Telugu films like Manmadhudu (2002) along with Nagarjuna and Sonali Bendre, Ammayilu Abbayilu (2003) and Puttintiki Ra Chelli (2004) sharing screen space with Arjun and Meena, with the latter in particular becoming a high commercial success, running for 275 days in theatres. She then got introduced to the Tamil film industry by R. Parthiban in his film Kudaikul Mazhai (2004), enacting the lead female role and changing her screen name to Madhumitha, named after her character in the film.

Though the film wasn't a major success, Madhumitha received several offers from Tamil directors. She played leading roles in several Tamil films like Amudhae (2005), Englishkaran (2005) opposite Sathyaraj and Namitha. She was appreciated for her performance in the film. A review by Indiaglitz.com quoted, "Madhumitha dominates the film. After her debut venture Kudaikul Mazhai, she has got a good scope to act, and she has used the opportunity well". Her next release was, Naalai (2006), which, however, did not fetch her any recognition, despite being moderate successes. She then appeared in the 2007 Tamil independent film Aanivaer, a film about the Sri Lankan Civil War, in which she enacted the role of a journalist. Since the film was released in many Western Tamil diasporal regions, she became widely noticed by the Tamil audience, winning accolades for her performance. In 2008, she appeared in the Tamil comedy film Arai En 305-il Kadavul, directed by Simbudevan, acting along with comedy actors Santhanam and Ganja Karuppu. She was next seen in Yogi, opposite director-turned-actor Ameer Sultan, Madhumitha's role was unanimously praised with a reviewer from Rediff.com citing that "Madhumitha, taking on a role even experienced actresses might balk at and coming out trumps" Her performance as a young mother living in the Chennai slums, was critically praised, winning her a nomination for the Best Supporting Actress Award at the 3rd Vijay Awards. Solla Solla Inikkum, got released post marriage, which failed to achieve commercial success. Post her marriage, she played supporting roles in Venkat Prabhu's Biriyani and the Telugu films Uu Kodathara? Ulikki Padathara?, Maine Pyar Kiya and Bhale Bhale Magadivoy.

== Personal life ==
Madhumitha married her longtime boyfriend, actor Siva Balaji on 1 March 2009 at Kalinga Function Place in Hyderabad, Telangana. Siva Balaji was her co-actor in her film Englishkaran. They have two sons, Dhanvin kangula and Gagan kangula.

== Filmography ==
Year	Film	Role	Language	Notes
2002	Sandade Sandadi	Manju	Telugu	Credited as Swapna Madhuri
2002	Kalusukovalani	Anjali's friend	Telugu	
2002	Mounamelanoyi	Mounika's cousin	Telugu	
2002	Nuvve Nuvve	Shanti	Telugu	
2002	Rendu Gundela Chappudu		Telugu	
2002	Manmadhudu	Swapna	Telugu	
2003	Ammayilu Abbayilu	Ranjani	Telugu	Credited as Swapna Madhuri
2003	Dham	Sarada	Telugu	
2004	Puttintiki Ra Chelli	Lakshmi	Telugu	Credited as Swathi
2004	Kudaikul Mazhai	Madhumitha	Tamil	
2004	Hucchana Maduveli Undone Jaana	Bhagya	Kannada	Credited as Swapna Madhuri
2005	Keelu Gurram		Telugu	Credited as Swapna Madhuri
2005	Amudhae	Nancy	Tamil	
2005	Boyy Friennd	Lekha	Malayalam	
2005	Englishkaran	Sandhya	Tamil	
2006	Naalai	Charu	Tamil	
2007	Aanivaer	Sandhya	Tamil	
2007	Naanu Neenu Jodi	Gowri	Kannada	
2008	Arai En 305-il Kadavul	Mahishasuramardhini (Mahi)	Tamil	
2009	Solla Solla Inikkum	Radhika	Tamil	
2009	Yogi	Rajasulochana	Tamil	Won- Vikatan Award for Best Supporting Actress Nominated, Vijay Award for Best Supporting Actress
2011	Thoonga Nagaram		Tamil	Special appearance
2011	Kadhal Meipada	Aishwarya	Tamil	
2012	Uu Kodathara? Ulikki Padathara?	Visalakshi	Telugu	
2013	Biriyani	Varalakshmi	Tamil	
2014	Maine Pyar Kiya	Malathi	Telugu	
2015	Bhale Bhale Magadivoy	Gayathri	Telugu	
2019	Vinaya Vidheya Rama	Nandana	Telugu	
2022	10th Class Diaries		Telugu	
