= Devaraagam =

- Poster
- Directed by: Bharathan
- Screenplay by: Bharathan
- Story by: S. S. Mani
- Produced by: Bharathan
- Starring: Aravind Swamy; Sridevi
- Cinematography: Ravi Yadav
- Edited by: B. Lenin; V. T. Vijayan
- Music by: M. M. Keeravani
- Release date: 6 April 1996
- Country: India
- Language: Malayalam

Devaraagam is a 1996 Indian Malayalam-language romantic drama film directed by Bharathan and starring Aravind Swamy and Sridevi. It also has KPAC Lalitha, Kozhikode Narayanan Nair, Zeenath, and Nedumudi Venu in supporting roles. The film was famous for its music which was composed by M. M. Keeravani.

All of the film's songs topped the charts. This was actress Sridevi's return to Malayalam cinema after a long gap, as she concentrated on her Hindi film career. Sridevi was reportedly doing a sequel titled Sree Sree Devaraagam, and it was shelved after she died. This was also Sridevi's last Malayalam film.

== Plot ==
The film opens with a young child climbing into a bullock cart and insisting that he also go with the cart to pick up the 'Shavundi' – a person who performs funeral rites and lives on the cremation grounds. Though essential to the funeral ceremonies, he is often considered frightening or unlucky. He certainly looks that way too – covered in ash and grime, sleeping in a bat-infested grove, and given ominous background music. The 'Shavundi' and the child begin talking in the cart ride to the funeral, and then a flashback takes us to meet Lakshmi.

Life for Lakshmi takes a turn when Vishnu, the new priest's son and priest-in-training, shows up in her village. Lakshmi is instantly intrigued by the new young man in town and strives to start a relationship with him. Certain antics and innocent clashes follow, and both of them fall in love.

Later, problems arise due to Vishnu's status in society; i. e. he is a brahmachari and cannot marry. Later, Lakshmi visits an astrologer who says that Lakshmi and Vishnu's life together is full of difficulties. He also suggests that if Lakshmi and Vishnu visit a particular temple, all their sins in this life will end, and it is believed that a new life begins. So Vishnu and Lakshmi secretly get married and consummate their marital union.

Meanwhile, Lakshmi's aunt visits her, and she decides to fix her marriage to her son, Parthasarathy. When Lakshmi opens up about her love for Vishnu to her father, he blackmails her, threatening to kill himself. He also asks Vishnu to help him get Lakshmi married as he decided.

It is presumed that Vishnu's father would perform Lakshmi's wedding rituals. But as he is ill, he forces Vishnu to perform the wedding. Vishnu is forced to perform the wedding of his wife Lakshmi, who is equally heartbroken and helpless. She has to go through the ordeal. After the wedding, Lakshmi's husband is informed that she loved Vishnu, and he says it's not a problem for him. Later, Lakshmi becomes pregnant and asks her husband for forgiveness. Lakshmi's husband admits that he is impotent, and that he does not want anyone else to know that Lakshmi is pregnant with another man's child.

Broken and distraught, Vishnu leaves his home and travels to many temples, hoping to find peace. He visits his father's old student and stays in his house. The student is now a renowned priest and impressed by Vishnu. He is interested in marrying his daughter Kokila to Vishnu. Kokila, an ad film actress, also likes Vishnu, but Vishnu is unable to forget Lakshmi and does not want to marry anyone else. Due to illness Kokila's father asks Vishnu to perform a puja which he was to perform. Even though he is hesitant, Vishnu agrees to go. The sudden view of kolam in front of the house reminds Vishnu of his Lakshmi, and when the door opens, he sees none other than Lakshmi. He performs the puja for the child without knowing that it is his son. Out of grief and pain, he yells at his father and reveals how he had performed the mangalyapuja for his own wife. His father, a true brahmin, curses that Vishnu be unfit to perform any pujas and that he become a Shavundi which is considered a sinful duty.

In the present, Lakshmi's husband is dead, and Vishnu is the one who is performing his funeral as Shavundi. Seeing this, Lakshmi becomes furious and reveals that her only son cannot perform the last rites as his father is alive and he is none other than Vishnu, the one who blessed her son once as a pujari for long life. Hearing this, everyone is shocked.

Vishnu refuses to become the Shavundi and takes Lakshmi and their son away to lead a happy life.

== Cast ==
- Aravind Swamy as Vishnu Narayanan
- Sridevi as Bhagyalakshmi "Lakshmi"
- Rajiv Krishna as Parthasarathy
- KPAC Lalitha as Alamelu
- Nedumudi Venu as Shankaran
- Chippy as Indhu
- Janardanan as Harihara Subramanya Iyyer
- Kaveri
- M. S. Thripunithura
- Kozhikode Narayanan Nair
- Narendra Prasad as Ramadhanapadikal
- Priyanka Anoop
- Reena
- Ravi Menon
- Zeenath as Malathy
- Ravali as Kokila
- Par

== Production ==
Kasthuri was initially considered for the lead role, before the makers chose Sridevi. The reason that Sridevi accepted the role was because Sridevi's mother, Rajeshwari Ayyappan, had told Bharathan that Sridevi would act in one of his films. Revathi dubbed Sridevi's voice and Sridevi dubbed herself for the Tamil version

== Soundtrack ==
The music was composed by M. M. Keeravani and the lyrics were penned by M. D. Rajendran.

Malayalam version

Song	Singers	Lyrics
"Devaraagam"	P. Jayachandran, K. S. Chithra	M. D. Rajendran
"Entharo Mahaanu Bhaavulu"	Arundhathi	Tyagaraja
"Karivari Vandukal"	P. Jayachandran	M. D. Rajendran
"Shashikala Chaarthiya"	K. S. Chithra, M. M. Keeravani, Master Don Vincent	M. D. Rajendran
"Shishirakaala Meghamidhuna"	P. Jayachandran, K. S. Chithra	M. D. Rajendran
"Thaazhampoo"	Sujatha, Sindhu	M. D. Rajendran
"Ya Ya Ya Yadava"	K. S. Chithra, P. Unnikrishnan	M. D. Rajendran

Tamil version (Dubbed)

Song	Singers	Lyrics
"Entharo Mahaanu Bhaavulu"	Arundhathi	Tyagaraja
"Chinna Chinna Megam"	S. P. Balasubrahmanyam, Sujatha	Vairamuthu
"Azhagiya Karthigai"	K. S. Chithra	Vairamuthu
"Karuvanna Vandugal"	P. Jayachandran	Vairamuthu
"Ya Ya Yadava"	K. S. Chithra, S. P. Balasubrahmanyam	Vairamuthu
"Thaazhampoo"	Sujatha, Nirmala	Vairamuthu
"Kadhal Ganam"	K. S. Chithra	Vairamuthu

Telugu version (Dubbed)

Song	Singers	Length (m:ss)
"Neela Varna"	M. M. Keeravani	02:28
"Prema Raagam"	K. S. Chithra, Chorus	04:19
"Sravanala Meghamaala"	S. P. Balasubrahmanyam, M. M. Srilekha	05:04
"Kannula Karthika"	K. S. Chithra, P. Jayachandran & Chorus	04:55
"Sirimalle Mogga Meeda"	K. S. Chithra & Chorus	04:29

== Reception ==
K. N. Vijiyan of the New Straits Times, reviewing the Tamil dubbed version, wrote, "There are no fast dances or fighting scenes here. Just good acting and film-making at its best. Definitely something to be experienced". K. S. Chithra won the 1996 Kerala State Film Awards for Best Singer for the song "Sasikala Charthiya".

== In other media ==
The track "Ya Ya Ya Yadava" is reused in the 2024 Malayalam film Premalu in the title "Devaragam 2.0".
