= Sankranti (film) =

2005 Indian Telugu Language Film

- Directed by: Muppalaneni Shiva
- Screenplay by: Muppalaneni Shiva; Paruchuri brothers (dialogues )
- Story by: N. Linguswamy
- Based on: Aanandham
- Produced by: R. B. Choudary
- Starring: Venkatesh; Srikanth; Siva Balaji; Sharwanand; Sneha; Sangeetha; Aarthi Agarwal; Rathi
- Cinematography: B. Balamurugan
- Edited by: Nandamuri Hari
- Music by: S.A. Rajkumar
- Production company: Super Good Films
- Release date: 18 February 2005
- Running time: 158 minutes
- Country: India
- Language: Telugu

Sankranti is a 2005 Indian Telugu-language drama film produced by R. B. Choudary under Super Good Films and directed by Muppalaneni Shiva. The film stars Venkatesh, Srikanth, Sneha, Sangeetha and Aarthi Agarwal alongside Siva Balaji, Sharwanand, Rathi, Sharada and Chandra Mohan in supporting roles. The music was composed by S. A. Rajkumar with cinematography by B. Balamurugan and editing by Nandamuri Hari. The film released on 18 February 2005 and was successful at the box office. It is a remake of the 2001 Tamil film Aanandham.

== Plot ==
Raghavendra owns a provisional store and is the eldest among four brothers, and all live together in a home along with their parents Rama Chandraiah and Janakamma. Raghavendra is widely respected by everyone in the family and was responsible for bringing back their family to a good state after financial troubles a few years back where he also lost the love of his fiancé, Padma, as her parents broke off their engagement over Raghavendra's poverty. Raghavendra has since married Anjali, who is very responsible and kind to everyone. Vishnu is the second son in the family who assists Raghavendra in managing their provisional store. He is innocent and marries his relative Kalyani who is Padma's younger sister, but she is short-tempered and picks up quarrels often. Chinna is the third son in the family, and he goes to college where he falls for his classmate Kaveri, who is the only daughter of a rich arrogant man named Govardhan Chowdary. Vamsi is the youngest son and studies in college.

Kalyani feels that only Raghavendra is respected by everyone and not Vishnu because Raghavendra manages the provisional store, while Vishnu just assists him. She keeps insisting Vishnu to start a separate provisional store, which he does not accept as that would separate him from his brothers. Meanwhile, Govardhan gets to know about Kaveri's love towards Chinna and warns him to forget her. Chinna gets a job and leaves to Delhi as he does not want to marry Kaveri against her father's wishes.

One day, Kalyani begins a quarrel at home, saying that Raghavendra has a separate savings account in the bank and takes money from the account without the knowledge of other family members. Raghavendra feels bad upon hearing this. Suddenly, Kalyani and Vishnu's daughter faints and is rushed to the hospital. It is revealed that the child was suffering from a serious disease which only Raghavendra knew before, and he was saving money to meet out the medical expenses without informing others, as they will worry if they get to know about the child's disease. Kalyani realizes her mistake upon knowing this and apologizes to Raghavendra for her harsh behavior towards him and Anjali.

Later, they start a rice mill. Raghavendra gets to know about Chinna's love towards Kaveri and goes to meet Govardhan with a marriage proposal. Govardhan agrees for the wedding but on a condition that Chinna should stay along with Kaveri in his home as he does not want to send his daughter to another home after wedding. Raghavendra agrees to the condition but does not inform this to Chinna as he will not agree. On the day of engagement, Chinna gets to know about the condition, cancels the wedding, and comes back to his home to meet his family members. Following him, Kaveri also comes, asking him to marry her against her father's wishes.

Raghavendra convinces the couple that if they get married without Govardhan's permission, then it will be a big blow to Govardhan's status in society, and they should not be the reason behind that. He also convinces Kaveri to go back to her home immediately before anyone could know about this. When they step out of the home, they see Govardhan with a group of men to attack Raghavendra's family. However, he has overheard Raghavendra's conversation with Kaveri, realizes his good nature, and agrees for their wedding. Finally, Chinna and Kaveri get married happily, and Kaveri lives along with everyone in a joint family in Raghavendra's home.

== Cast ==
- Venkatesh as Raghavendra
- Srikanth as Vishnu
- Siva Balaji as Chinna
- Sharwanand as Vamsi
- Sneha as Anjali
- Sangeetha as Kalyani
- Aarthi Agarwal as Padma
- Rathi as Kaveri
- Sharada as Janakamma, mother of Raghavendra, Vishnu, Chinna and Vamsi
- Giri Babu as Rama Chandra Murthy
- Chandra Mohan as Rama Chandraiah, father of Raghavendra, Vishnu, Chinna and Vamsi
- Prakash Raj as Govardhan Chowdary, Kaveri's father
- Sudhakar as Anji
- Tanikella Bharani as Rayudu
- AVS as Supermarket Owner
- Venu Madhav as Nalla Balu
- Suman Setty as Thief
- Tirupathi Prakash as Thief
- Narsing Yadav as Police Officer
- Raghunatha Reddy as Sheshagiri
- Rallapalli as Satya Murthy
- Duvvasi Mohan
- Malladi Raghava as Kavitha's father
- Siva Parvathi as Padma and Kalyani's mother
- Sri Harsha as Balaji
- Chandra Mouli as Postman
- Jahnavi as Kavitha
- Dil Ramesh
- Baby Srilekha as Shanthi, Vishnu and Kalyani's daughter
- Master Tanish as Young Chinna
- Master Manoj as Young Vamsi

== Production ==
It was originally announced in 2001 that Tamil film Anandham will be remade in Telugu with Nagarjuna, Srikanth and Venu with R. R. Shinde as director which did not happen.

== Soundtrack ==
Sankranti

Film score by S. A. Rajkumar
- Released: 20 January 2005
- Recorded: 2005
- Genre: Soundtrack
- Length: 32:10
- Label: Aditya Music
- Producer: S. A. Rajkumar

S. A. Rajkumar chronology
Cheppave Chirugali (2004)	Sankranti (2005)	Naidu LLB (2005)

The music was composed by S. A. Rajkumar and released by the ADITYA Music Company. The soundtrack of Sankranti was released at a function arranged in the Rama Naidu studios on the night of 20 January 2005. Sarath Kumar, K Raghavendra Rao and D Rama Naidu were invited as guests. The actors who attended included Venkatesh, Aarthi Agarwal, Aditi Agarwal, Sharada, Sneha, Sudhakar, Srikanth, Siva Balaji, and Sharwanand. Sarath Kumar and K. Raghavendra Rao released the soundtrack and gave the first copy to D. Ramanaidu. Anupama hosted this event. Aditya Music bought the audio rights to this film. The soundtrack was released on 21 January 2005.

Two songs ("Andala Srimathiki" and "Doli Doli") are based on "Mazhaiye" and "Doli Doli" from Punnagai Desam. "Pelli Pata", "Aade Pade" and "Aasa Aasaga" are based on the songs "Gokulathu Radhai", "Pallangkuzhiyin", and "Aasai Aasaiyai" from Aanandham. The song "Chilakaa" is based on "Sirichi Sirichi Vantha" composed by Bharathwaj for Vasool Raja MBBS.

Track list
No.	Title	Lyrics	Artist(s)	Length
1.	"Ela Vachenamma"	ES Murthy	Udit Narayan, Sadhana Sargam	4:33
2.	"Andala Srimatiki"	ES Murthy	Hariharan, Shreya Ghoshal	4:41
3.	"Ade Pade"	Pothula Ravikiran	Karthik, K. S. Chithra	4:49
4.	"Aasa Aasaga"	Sitarama Sastry	S. P. Balasubrahmanyam	5:07
5.	"Chilakaa"	Bhaskarabhatla	Shankar Mahadevan, Sujatha	5:07
6.	"Doli Doli"	ES Murthy	Shankar Mahadevan, S. A. Rajkumar, K. S. Chithra, Kalpana	5:34
7.	"Pelli Pata-I"	ES Murthy	Parthasarathy, Murali	1:27
8.	"Pelli Pata-II"	ES Murthy	Parthasarathy, Murali	1:26
Total length:				32:10

== Reception ==
Jeevi of idlebrain.com gave a review of rating 3.75/5 stating, "First half of the film is good and it establishes and defines each and every character. Second half is more effective because the director could really bring heavy emotions out and end the film smoothly. I recommend this film to everybody. Everybody should watch this film along with their family members to realize what they really miss in real life. This film also reminds us how to behave with our family members and how to share love/affection."

Phani of Totltollywood.com gave a review stating, "The film has got all plus points except for the average music and only little comedy. This is definitely a long runner at the box office since this is a family entertainer and the director did a great job in the presentation. Cast also delivered good performances. This is definitely a good emotional family entertainer."

Allindiansite.com said, "'Sankranti' is based on the concept of joint family. The story runs on the relations between the characters. It is a decent family entertainer with good dose of sentiments."

The film was a blockbuster in 2005 and grossed around 30.7 crores domestically. Its total collection is 41.9 crore worldwide. This was the second highest grossing Telugu Film of 2005, following Chiranjeevi's Andarivaadu, which grossed 43cr worldwide.
