= Puttintiki Ra Chelli =

- Directed by: Kodi Ramakrishna
- Written by: Pusala. V (Dialogues)
- Screenplay by: Kodi Ramakrishna
- Story by: Ajay Kumar
- Based on: Thavarige Baa Thangi (2002)
- Produced by: R. S. Goud; Basavraj
- Starring: Arjun Sarja; Meena; Swati
- Music by: S. A. Rajkumar
- Production company: MEGA HIT FILMS
- Release date: 14 April 2004
- Country: India
- Language: Telugu
- Box office: ₹8 crore distributors' share

Puttintiki Raa Chelli is a 2004 Indian Telugu-language drama film directed by Kodi Ramakrishna and produced by R. S. Goud and Basavraj. It stars Arjun, Meena and Madhumitha (credited as Swati). It was released on 14 April 2004, and was dubbed and released in Tamil as Anbu Sagotharan with comedy track reshot with Manivannan, Senthil and Shakeela. The movie is a remake of the 2002 Kannada film Thavarige Baa Thangi. The movie became super hit at the box-office.

== Cast ==
- Arjun Sarja as Sivanna
- Meena as Gowramma
- Swati as Lakshmi
- Srinath as Ajay
- Hema Choudhary as Kantham
- Pragathi as Sivanna and Lakshmi's mother
- Sivaji Raja
- Costumes Krishna
- Dharmavarapu Subramanyam
- Ananth Raj
- Jyothi
- Shakeela
- Kusumuri
- Sudhakar
- Surya
- Apoorva
- Shanoor Sana
- Kalpana Rai
- Suma

== Soundtrack ==
The soundtrack was composed by S. A. Rajkumar and the lyrics were penned by Sai Sri Harsha & Surendra Krishna. "Chaamanthi Poobanthi" was reused again by Rajkumar as "Kandamma Kandamma" in Kannada film Maharaja for which K. S. Chithra won the Karnataka State Award. All songs were sung by eminent singers like K. S. Chithra, S. P. Balasubrahmanyam, Udit Narayan, Sujatha Mohan, Mano etc. The audio was launched on 29 February 2004 at Sitara Hotel, Ameerpet.

Telugu version

Puttintiki Ra.. Chelli - Track List
No.	Title	Singer(s)	Length
1.	"Gopala Gopala"	Udit Narayan, Sujatha Mohan	4:38
2.	"Chamanthi Poobanthi"	K. S. Chithra	5:43
3.	"Anuragham Chese"	K. S. Chihtra, S. A. Rajkumar	5:18
4.	"Ghunthakallu Ghumma"	Sujatha Mohan, Tippu	4:03
5.	"Seethakoka Chilaka La Chelli"	K. S. Chithra, Mano	5:39
6.	"Anna Anna Puttintiki"	K. S. Chithra, S.P. Balu	5:37
7.	"Chamanthi Poobanthi"	Madhu Balakrishnan	5:43
Total length:			36:41

Tamil version

Lyrics - Pa. Vijay

- Thaai Veettukku - Mano, Sujatha
- Gopala Gopala - Karthik, Malathi
- Aagaya Suriyane - S. A. Rajkumar, Sujatha
- Saamanthi - Unni Menon
- Dindukkal Poottu - Karthik, Kalpana
- Vanavil Pole - Mano, Vidya

== Reception ==
Idlebrain wrote "Screenplay of the film is average. Kodi Rama Krishna is expert at handling sentimental stories. In This film also he inserted all ingredients to attract female audiences. But he over did the sentiment scenes most of the times". Telugu Cinema wrote "Do we need to buy this sort of remakes from other languages? This type of sentimental stuff we are watching from the day one of the Telugu cinema was born. (The film is a remake of Kannada block buster). We are already watching this sort of stuff in TV as serials".
