= Biju Narayanan =

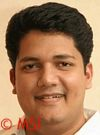

Background information
- Born: 7 March 1973 (age 53)
- Origin: Kochi, Kerala, India
- Occupation: Playback singer
- Instrument: Vocals
- Years active: 1992–present

Biju Narayanan is an Indian playback singer active mainly in Malayalam films.

== Career ==
Biju Narayanan trained in Carnatic music under Aryanad Sadasivan for eight years. He began his music career singing tracks for P. Jayachandran, Unni Menon and KG Markose. He got his first opportunity to sing in a devotional album in 1992, while he was a pre-degree student. He was the winner in the light music category at the M. G. University youth festival and this was a turning point in his career. He began his playback singing career with the song "Pathu Veluppinu" from the 1993 movie Venkalam composed by Raveendran. He was adjudged the best male singer in the State drama awards in 1996.

== Family ==
He married Sreelatha on 23 January 1998. After 21 years together, Sreelatha died from cancer on 13 August 2019 at the age of 44. Sreelatha was his classmate in Maharajas College, Eranakulam. The couple has two sons, Sidharth Narayanan and Suryaa Naarayan.
