= Manassil Oru Manjuthulli =

- Screenplay by: Suresh
- Release date: 5 June 2000
- Country: India
- Language: Malayalam

Manassil Oru Manjuthulli is a Malayalam language film. It was released in 2000.

== Cast ==
- Krishna Kumar as Mohandas
- Nishanth Sagar as Manoj
- Praveena as Maya
- Jagathy Sreekumar as Parasahayam Adiyodi/Ramu
- Kalpana as Rajamma
- Saju Kodiyan as Manikandan
- Manka Mahesh as Bharathi
