= List of Tamil films of 1998 =

A list of films produced in the Tamil film industry in India in 1998 by release date.

== Films ==
=== January — March ===
Opening		Title	Director	Cast	Studio	Ref
J A N	12	Moovendhar	Suraj	Sarath Kumar, Devayani	Ganga Gowri Production	
J A N	14	Kaadhale Nimmadhi	Indiran	Murali, Suriya, Jeevitha Sharma, Sangeetha	Sivasakthi Movie Makers	
J A N	14	Kizhakkum Merkkum	Kalanjiyam	Napoleon, Devayani	Deivanai Movie International	
J A N	14	Maru Malarchi	Bharathi	Mammooty, Devayani, Ranjith	Pangaj Productions	
J A N	14	Naam Iruvar Namakku Iruvar	Sundar C	Prabhu Deva, Meena, Maheswari	BS Arts	
J A N	14	Ponmanam	S. P. Rajkumar	Prabhu, Suvalakshmi, Priya Raman	Pyramid Films International	
J A N	14	Ulavuthurai	Ramesh Selvan	Vijayakanth, Meena, Sanghavi	IV Cine Arts	
J A N	16	Udhavikku Varalaamaa	Gokula Krishnan	Karthik, Devayani, Sangeetha, Anju Aravind	Taaj International	
F E B	6	Kondattam	K. S. Ravikumar	Arjun, Simran, Mantra	Sai Lakshmi Movie Makers	
F E B	13	Dhinamdhorum	Nagarajan	Murali, Suvalakshmi	Mother Movie Makers	
F E B	20	Bhagavath Singh	A. C. Chandrakumar	Napoleon, Sanghavi	Kavikuyil Cine Arts	
F E B	20	Sundara Pandian	R. Raghu	Karthik, Swathi, Heera	Jupiter Film Makers	
F E B	20	Swarnamukhi	K. S. Adhiyaman	R. Parthiban, Devayani	Muthu Movies	
F E B	26	Velai	J. Suresh	Vignesh, Indraja	JV Films	
M A R	6	Colour Kanavugal	Vishnu	Karan, Khushbu	KRK Movies	
M A R	6	Kaadhal Mannan	Saran	Ajith Kumar, Maanu	Venkateswaralayam	
M A R	6	Kangalin Vaarthaigal	Muktha S. Sundar	Vikram, Prema, Sriram	Mukthaa Films	
M A R	6	Vaettiya Madichu Kattu	K. Bhagyaraj	K. Bhagyaraj, Nagma	Saranya Cini Combines	
M A R	12	Thulli Thirintha Kaalam	Balasekaran	Arun Kumar, Khushbu, Roshini	Kavithalayaa Productions	
M A R	18	Ini Ellam Sugame	A. R. Ramesh	Abbas, Sanghavi	Valli Cine Arts	

=== April — June ===
Opening		Title	Director	Cast	Studio	Ref
A P R	3	Santhosham	Karthik	Saravanan, Suvalakshmi	Janaki Ammal Movies	
A P R	10	Kaathala Kaathala	Singeetam Srinivasa Rao	Kamal Haasan, Prabhu Deva, Soundarya, Rambha	Saraswathi Films	
A P R	10	Ninaithen Vandhai	K. Selva Bharathy	Vijay, Rambha, Devayani	Raghavendra Movie Corporation	
A P R	10	Ponnu Velayira Bhoomi	K. Krishnan	Rajkiran, Khushbu, Vineetha	AGS Films International	
A P R	10	Veera Thalattu	Kasthuri Raja	Murali, Khushbu	Kasthoori Manga Creations	
A P R	13	Kavalai Padathe Sagodhara	Keyaar	Pandiarajan, Suvalakshmi	Subbu Films Productions	
A P R	24	Jeans	Shankar	Prashanth, Aishwarya Rai, Lakshmi, Nassar, Raadhika	Amritraj Solomon Communications	
M A Y	1	Vettu Onnu Thundu Rendu	C. Dinakaran	Mansoor Ali Khan, Keerthana	Tamizh Perarasu	
M A Y	7	Jolly	Dilipkumar	Abbas, Kausalya, Keerthi Reddy, Khushbu	Super Good Films	
M A Y	7	Rathna	Ilanchezhian	Murali, Maheswari, Sangita	Pinky Productions	
M A Y	15	Aval Varuvala	Raj Kapoor	Ajith Kumar, Simran, Goundamani, Senthil	Sri Vijayamathruka Films	
M A Y	15	Harichandra	Cheyyar Ravi	Karthik, Meena, Priya Raman	Sathya Jyothi Films	
M A Y	15	Iniyavale	Seeman	Prabhu, Suvalakshmi, Gauthami, Keerthi Reddy	MVM Pictures	
J U N	5	Gol Mall	Selva	Selva, Monica Nerukkar, Abitha	North East Pictures	
J U N	12	Priyamudan	Vincent Selva	Vijay, Kausalya	Lakshmi Movie Makers	
J U N	25	Natpukkaga	K. S. Ravikumar	Sarath Kumar, Simran, Vijayakumar	Sri Surya Movies	

=== July — September ===
Opening		Title	Director	Cast	Studio	Ref
J U L	9	Dharma	Keyaar	Vijayakanth, Preetha Vijayakumar	Rowther Films	
J U L	9	Sandhippoma	Indrakumar	Suriya, Preetha Vijayakumar	Super Good Films	
J U L	10	Poonthottam	Kalanjiyam	Murali, Devayani, Vijayalakshmi	Roja Combines	
J U L	31	Kalyana Galatta	Raj Kapoor	Sathyaraj, Mantra, Khushbu	Malar Films	
J U L	31	Sollamale	Sasi	Livingston, Kausalya	Super Good Films	
A U G	14	Nilaave Vaa	A. Venkatesh	Vijay, Suvalakshmi, Sanghavi	VJ Film	
A U G	15	Unnidathil Ennai Koduthen	Vikraman	Karthik, Roja, Ajith Kumar	Lakshmi Movie Makers	
A U G	28	En Aasai Rasave	Kasthuri Raja	Sivaji Ganesan, Murali, Roja, Suvalakshmi	Pyramid Films International	
A U G	28	Thayin Manikodi	Arjun	Arjun, Tabu, Nivedita Jain	Sri Lakshmi Devi Associates	
S E P	4	Ellame En Pondattithaan	V. Sekhar	Ramki, Sanghavi	Sri Surya Movies	
S E P	11	Kannedhirey Thondrinal	Ravichandran	Prashanth, Simran, Karan	Sivasakthi Movie Makers	
S E P	11	Senthooram	Sangaman	Moorthy, Devayani	Sri Senthoor Films	
S E P	18	Aasai Thambi	Senthilnathan	Abbas, Arun Pandian, Anju Aravind	Cheranaadu Movie Creations	

=== October — December ===
Opening		Title	Director	Cast	Studio	Ref
O C T	18	Unnudan	R. Balu	Murali, Kausalya	Sunitha Productions	
O C T	19	Desiya Geetham	Cheran	Murali, Rambha, Nassar	Tara's Creations	
O C T	19	En Uyir Nee Thaane	S. P. Rajkumar	Prabhu, Devayani, Maheswari	Jeeva Jyothi Films	
O C T	19	Simmarasi	Erode Soundar	Sarath Kumar, Khushbu, Kanaka	Super Good Films	
O C T	19	Urimai Por	Raja Rajendran	Arun Pandian, Ranjitha	Deepa Lakshmi Cine Arts	
O C T	19	Veeram Vilanja Mannu	Kasthuri Raja	Vijayakanth, Khushbu, Roja	Lakshmi Movie Makers	
O C T	20	Pudhumai Pithan	Jeeva	R. Parthiban, Roja, Priya Raman, Devayani	Pangaj Productions	
N O V	6	Ponmaanai Thedi	Pari	Saravanan, Suvarna Mathew	Suba Seelu Films	
N O V	13	Guru Paarvai	Manoj Kumar	Prakash Raj, Khushbu, Anju Aravind, Easwari Rao	Manoj Creations	
N O V	20	Uyirodu Uyiraga	Sushma Ahuja	Ajith Kumar, Richa Ahuja	SS Films	
N O V	26	Kumbakonam Gopalu	Keyaar	Pandiarajan, Mayuri	Prasath Art Productions	
D E C	2	Kannathal	Bharathi Kannan	Karan, Khushbu, Neena	Super Good Films	
D E C	4	Pooveli	Selva	Karthik, Abbas, Kausalya, Heera Rajagopal	Kavithalayaa Productions	
D E C	4	Thalaimurai	Saravana Pandian	Rajkiran, Bhanupriya, Revathi	Muthu Movies	
D E C	11	Ilamanasa Killathe	P. N. Seenivasan	Latha, Shakeela	SS Art Combines	
D E C	23	Thanga Magal	Ilayavan	Ravi, Rukmini	My Dear Films	
D E C	25	Cheran Chozhan Pandian	Senthamizhan	Ranjith, Mohini	K. C. R. Creations	
D E C	25	Kaadhal Kavithai	Agathiyan	Prashanth, Isha Koppikar, Kasthuri	Metro Film Corporation	
D E C	25	Sivappu Nila	J. George Prasad	Raja, Vineetha	Velankanni Cine Arts	

== Awards ==
Category/Organization	Cinema Express Awards 23 August 1999	Dinakaran Cinema Awards 11 April 1999	Filmfare Awards South August 1999	Tamil Nadu State Film Awards January 2000
Best Film	Unnidathil Ennai Koduthen	Unnidathil Ennai Koduthen	Natpukkaga	Natpukkaga
Best Director		Vikraman; Unnidathil Ennai Koduthen	Cheran; Desiya Geetham	Parthiban; House Full (1999)
Best Actor	Karthik; Unnidathil Ennai Koduthen	Karthik; Unnidathil Ennai Koduthen	Sarathkumar; Natpukkaga	Sarathkumar; Natpukkaga / Simmarasi
Best Actress	Roja; Unnidathil Ennai Koduthen	Kausalya; Pooveli / Sollamale	Kausalya; Pooveli	Roja; Unnidathil Ennai Koduthen
Best Music Director		A. R. Rahman; Jeans	A. R. Rahman; Jeans	Bobby; Sollamale
