= Vinnukum Mannukum =

2001 film

- Title card
- Directed by: Rajakumaran
- Written by: Rajakumaran
- Produced by: R. B. Choudary
- Starring: Sarathkumar; Vikram; Khushbu; Devayani
- Cinematography: Agilan
- Music by: Sirpy
- Production company: Super Good Films
- Release date: 30 March 2001
- Running time: 156 minutes
- Country: India
- Language: Tamil

Vinnukum Mannukum (transl. For Space and for Land) is a 2001 Indian Tamil-language romance film written and directed by Rajakumaran. It stars Sarathkumar, Vikram, Khushbu and Devayani who plays a fictional version of herself in the film. It is also the final installment of Sarathkumar's Goundar trilogy after Nattamai and Surya Vamsam (1997 film) . The film was produced by R. B. Choudary of Super Good Films and released on 30 March 2001.

== Plot ==
Sakthivel is the leader of his village in Coimbatore and is always adored by the people. His younger brother is Selvam, who returns after completing his education in Singapore. Both Sakthivel and his wife Lakshmi are very fond of Selvam and want him to get married and live happily. Selvam is keen on marrying a girl that he has seen in his dream. Sakthivel is prepared to go anywhere to find the girl. Selvam actually comes across the photograph of his dream girl Devayani in a TV advertisement and discovers that she is an actress. A film crew lands in the village for shooting, and Devayani, as she is called in the film too, is in the group. Sakthivel approaches her with his brother's proposal, but she insults him. She tells him that she is beautiful and famous and cannot marry a villager. Whether Selvam accepts defeat or manages to bring her around forms the remaining story.

== Cast ==
- Sarathkumar as Sakthivel Goundar
- Vikram as Selvam Goundar
- Khushbu as Lakshmi
- Devayani as Devayani
  - Nicole as young Devayani
- Sukumari as Devayani's mother
- Mayilsamy as Associate Director
- Ramesh Khanna
- Rami Reddy
- Singamuthu
- Rathan
- Kumaresan
- Abbas (cameo)
- Vikraman (cameo)
- Agathiyan (cameo)
- M. N. Nambiar (cameo)

== Production ==
Sarathkumar chose to be a part of the film after two of his other films became suddenly postponed. He had cut his hair short for Maayi (2000), and as the other films required different hairstyles, the producers had pushed back the dates. To make up for the lost time, Sarathkumar agreed to portray an extended guest role in Vinnukum Mannukum. A shooting schedule took place at the AVM Studios in Chennai, where Vikram celebrated his birthday on the sets, with the unit members and Sarathkumar. In a 2008 interview, Vikram mentioned his displeasure at being a part of the film, claiming that he had arguments with the director for every single shot and that "everything in that film, right from the first shot was wrong. According to a report, "From the beginning, the film was considered a certain Deepavali release. But the director Rajakumaran failed to utilise the call sheets of Sarathkumar to optimum use. Sarath got wild because of this. He too caused some delay in finishing off the shootings".

Years later, Director Rajakumaran made a stunning claim that Vikram is not a genuinely talented actor because he relies entirely on extreme physical transformations, heavy makeup, and prosthetic gimmicks rather than authentic emotional depth. He argued that a true actor must captivate audiences using only subtle facial expressions during tight close-up shots—a skill he claims Vikram lacks, instead choosing to imitate industry legends like Kamal Haasan or Rajinikanth. This harsh critique is widely dismissed by film fans and critics as a "cringy," bitter retaliation stemming from a 25-year-old on-set feud during their filming of Vinnukum Mannukum

== Soundtrack ==
The music was composed by Sirpy.

Song	Singers	Lyrics
"Aagayam Pookkal"	P. Unnikrishnan, Sujatha	Viveka
"Chembaruthi Poo"	K. S. Chithra, Arunmozhi	Kalaikumar
"Kadhal Vinnukkum Mannukkum"	S. P. Balasubrahmanyam, Febi Mani	R.Ravishankar
"Paasamulla Sooriyane"	Krishnaraj, Mano	Manavai Ponmanikkam
"Unakenna" (Theme)	K. S. Chithra, Sirpy	
"Unakenna Unakenna" (female)	Sujatha	P. Vijay
"Unakenna Unakenna"	S. P. Balasubrahmanyam, Sujatha	P. Vijay

== Release and reception ==
Vinnukkum Mannukkum was released on 30 March 2001. Indiainfo wrote, "Devyani does a good job but Sarath and Vikram compete in giving wooden performances. Sirpy's antique music also does not help the film. Akilan's camera is ok". S. R. Ashok Kumar of The Hindu wrote: "Director Rajakumaran has taken special care in the choice of songs and locations to make the film entertaining. He should have paid more attention to the first half and more important, must have extracted more work from Vikram, who has the potential, and Devayani, for whom it is a cakewalk". Krishna Chidambaram of Kalki praised the acting of Devayani, Sarathkumar but felt Vikram failed to emote and the film did not offer emoting skills for him. Malini Mannath of Chennai Online wrote "The early part moves at a swift pace, with some humour thrown in. [..] When the story shifts to the city it turns clichéd". Cinesouth wrote, "Vinnukkum Mannukkum – The first half is a take-off and the second is a crash over". Choudhary incurred huge loss through this film and dubbed film Paapa; later he gained profits through films like Aanandham and Samudhiram, both films starring actor Murali.
