= Parambarai =

- Theatrical release poster
- Directed by: K. S. Ravikumar
- Screenplay by: K. S. Ravikumar
- Story by: Erode Soundar
- Produced by: Malar Balu; K. Dhandapani
- Starring: Prabhu; Roja
- Cinematography: Ashok Rajan
- Edited by: K. Thanikachalam
- Music by: Deva
- Production company: Malar Films
- Release date: 15 January 1996
- Running time: 150 minutes
- Country: India
- Language: Tamil

Parambarai (transl. Hereditary) is a 1996 Indian Tamil language drama film, directed by K. S. Ravikumar, starring Prabhu and Roja. The film was released on 15 January 1996, and was a commercial success at the box office.

== Plot ==
Paramasivam and his father have been in feud for several years.

In the past, Paramasivam saw his mother murdered by Maragatham but his father thought that she died because of her illness. His father later married Maragatham so Paramasivam left his father's house and lived with his grandmother.

Back to the present, Paramasivam falls in love with Paruvatham, sister of a ruthless landlord Kumarasamy who dislikes Paramasivam. Later, Paramasivam marries Paruvatham to which Kumarasamy decides to revenge Paramasivam by marrying his half-sister Parimila, daughter of Maragatham. Maragatham who is always jealous of Paramasivam's fame among villagers and her daughter affection towards him decides to kill him by joining hands with Kumarasamy who asks for an offer to marry her daughter which she accepts. Instead of Paramasivam, Kumarasamy's goons kills his grandmother for which he decides to kills him. Beside the failure of Paramasivam's murder Kumarasamy demands his marriage with Parimila to Maragatham who betrays him. Later a conflict happens between them where Kumarasamy won and order his goons to kill her with her husband and tries to rape Parimila where Paramasivam enters and rescue all even Maragatham who killed his mother.The movie ends by reunion of Paramasivam with his father and forgiving Maragatham.

== Cast ==
- Prabhu as Paramasivan
  - Mahendran as young Paramasivan
- Roja as Paravatham
- Manorama as Paramasivan's grandmother
- Goundamani as Karappusamy
- Vijayakumar as Paramasivan's father
- Senthil as Kanayiram
- Sindhu as Maragatham
- B. H. Tharun Kumar as Kumarasamy
- Jyothi Meena as Mangamma
- Meera as Parimala
- Sabitha Anand as Vijayakumar's first wife

== Soundtrack ==
The music was composed by Deva, with lyrics by Kalidasan.

Song	Singer(s)	Duration
"Ithu Maalakkaala"	S. P. Balasubrahmanyam, Sujatha Mohan	5:11
"Parambarai Nalla"	Krishnaraj, Shanmugasundari	5:15
"Thanjavur Nanthi"	Manorama, K. S. Chithra, Sundararajan	4:46
"Vaigasi Maasam"	Mano, Sujatha Mohan	5:08
"Vayakkaadu"	Mano, K. S. Chithra	5:09

== Reception ==
The film was a major commercial success. Kalki criticised the film for missing Ravikumar's signature directing style. The Hindu wrote "Director K.S. Ravikumar reshuffles Cheran Pandian and Naatamai formats to present a theme that runs on expected lines in Malar Films Paramparai where Prabhu is teamed with Roja for the first time, his lucky producer K. Balu of Chinna Thambi, making the village-based movie" and praised the performances of Prabhu, Roja and Ashok Kumar's cinematography.
