= Simmarasi =

- Theatrical release poster
- Directed by: Erode Soundar
- Written by: Erode Soundar
- Produced by: R. B. Choudary
- Starring: Sarathkumar; Khushbu
- Cinematography: G. Kicha
- Edited by: V. Jaishankar
- Music by: S. A. Rajkumar
- Production company: Super Good Films
- Release date: 19 October 1998
- Running time: 162 minutes
- Country: India
- Language: Tamil

Simmarasi (transl. Leo) is a 1998 Indian Tamil-language film directed and written by Erode Soundar. The film stars Sarathkumar and Khushbu. Kanaka, Manorama, Anandaraj and Vineeth play supporting roles. It was released on 19 October 1998, during Diwali, and became a success. Sarathkumar won the Tamil Nadu State Film Award for Best Actor. A sub-plot of the film went on to be used in the Telugu film Siva Rama Raju and the Kannada film Paramashiva, both of which were remakes of Samudhiram, another Sarathkumar film.

== Plot ==
A man named Manickavasagam happens to stop a caste fight in a village. The villagers ask him to stay and help with their conflicts, thus inciting the wrath of Marudhanayagam, a wealthy villager who is obsessed with caste limitations, and who has even killed his own brother for marrying into a different caste. Lakshmi's son Kathir wants to build a factory, which Manickavasagam will not allow. This makes Kathir ally with Marudhanayagam. Finally Manickavasagam kills Marudhanayagam.

== Cast ==
- Sarathkumar as Manickavasagam
- Khushbu as Sivagami, Manickavasagam's wife (Voice dubbed by KR Anuradha)
- Kanaka as Lakshmi (Voice dubbed by Durga Sundarrajan)
- Manorama as Manickavasagam's adopted mother
- Anandaraj as Marudhanayagam
- Vineeth as Kathir, Lakshmi's son (Voice dubbed by Ravishankar Devanarayanan)
- Ponnambalam as Police Inspector
- Thalaivasal Vijay as Lakshmi's husband
- Fathima Babu as Marudhanayagam's wife
- Easwari Rao as Rasathi (Voice dubbed by Jayageetha)
- Manivannan
- R. Sundarrajan
- Bala Singh
- Singamuthu
- Thalapathy Dinesh

== Production ==
Kanaka replaced Nagma in the film during July 1998 after her relationship with Sarathkumar ended. The climax song was shot at Gobichettipalayam for fifteen days.

== Soundtrack ==
The soundtrack was composed by S. A. Rajkumar.

Track listing
No.	Title	Lyrics	Singer(s)	Length
1.	"Thaayae Thirisooli"	S. A. Rajkumar	Krishnaraj, S. A. Rajkumar	6:09
2.	"Vanathu Nilaveduthu"	Kalai Kumar	P. Unni Krishnan, Swarnalatha	4:16
3.	"Kumbakonam Santhayile"	Vasan	Arunmozhi, Sujatha	4:30
4.	"Paru Thambi Paru"	Erode Soundar	Mano	4:02
5.	"Pacha Manna Thottu"	Mu. Metha	Mano, Sujatha	4:05
Total length:				23:02

== Reception ==
A critic from Dinakaran noted that "some of the scenes have come out good. But there is very, very long flash back scenes that among them some of the scenes really don't have that much relevance to the story line". Kala Krishnan-Ramesh of Deccan Herald wrote "Simmarasi deserves a response because its themes, its emotions, its sounds and colours are grander than those we are accustomed to." D. S. Ramanujam of The Hindu wrote, "Good performance by the principal players and the dialogue and screenplay of director Erode Sounder sustain the momentum in Supergood Films', Simmaraasi. The emotional content of the human drama, told in two parts, one taking place in the city and the other in a village, has been adequately supported by situations".

== Accolades ==
Sarathkumar won the Tamil Nadu State Film Award for Best Actor (also for his role in Natpukkaga), and Mohan Rajendran won for Best Art Director.
