= Cinema Express Award for Best Actor – Tamil =

Indian film award

- Awarded for: Best Performance by an Actor in a Leading Role in Tamil films
- Country: India
- Presented by: Cinema Express Awards

The Cinema Express Best Actor Award is given as a part of its annual Cinema Express Awards for Tamil (Kollywood) films.

== Winners ==
Year	Actor	Film	Ref.
1981	Kamal Haasan	Raja Paarvai	
1982	Kamal Haasan	Moondram Pirai	
1984	Rajinikanth	Nallavanuku Nallavan	
1985	Rajinikanth	Sri Raghavendra	
1986	Vijayakanth	Amman Kovil Kizhakale	
1987	Kamal Haasan	Nayakan	
1988	Prabhu	Manasukkul Mathappu	
1990	Kamal Haasan	Michael Madhana Kamarajan	
1991	Rajinikanth	Thalapathi	
1992	Kamal Haasan; Rajinikanth	Thevar Magan; Annaamalai	
1993	Sathyaraj	Walter Vetrivel	
1994	Sarathkumar	Nattamai	
1995	Rajinikanth	Baashha, Muthu	
1996	Kamal Haasan	Indian	
1997	Sarathkumar	Surya Vamsam	
1998	Karthik	Unnidathil Ennai Koduthen	
1999	Ajith Kumar	Valee, Amarkkalam	
2000	Ajith Kumar	Mugavaree	
2001	Ajith Kumar	Citizen	
2002	Vikram	Kasi	
