= Siva Rama Raju =

- DVD cover
- Directed by: V. Samudra
- Written by: Paruchuri Brothers (dialogues)
- Screenplay by: V. Samudra
- Story by: Erode Soundar
- Based on: Samudhiram (Tamil)
- Produced by: R. B. Choudary
- Starring: Jagapathi Babu; Nandamuri Harikrishna; Venkat; Sivaji; Monica
- Cinematography: Shyam K. Naidu
- Edited by: Nandamuri Hari
- Music by: S. A. Rajkumar
- Production company: Super Good Films
- Release date: 1 November 2002
- Running time: 164 minutes
- Country: India
- Language: Telugu

Siva Rama Raju is a 2002 Indian Telugu-language action drama film, produced by R. B. Choudary under Super Good Films and directed by V. Samudra. It stars Nandamuri Harikrishna, Jagapathi Babu, Venkat, Sivaji, Monica and has music composed by S. A. Rajkumar. The film was a remake of the Tamil film Samudhiram (2001), with flashback sub-plot borrowed from another Tamil film, Simmarasi (1998), a pattern later followed in the 2014 Kannada remake of this film, titled Paramashiva.

== Plot ==
The film begins in a village where three siblings, Sivaramaraju, Rama Raju, and Raju, belong to the royal dynasty and are at the forefront and inseparably joined to kinship. The three dote on their adorable little sister Swati and prepares everything for her bliss. They owe that three of them will wedlock in her sight. Firstly, Swati fixes a match for Sivaramaraju with a benignant Rajeswari. Every year, it is customary for their clan members to decorate the goddess of the village with garland and dance in front of the temple. On that occasion, Nagendra Varma Zamindar of the adjacent town attends with his son Aakash to offer gold to the goddess to fulfil a pledge. But they are stopped until the arrival of Sivaramaraju. Then, Aakash uses force when Ramaraju mishandles him and affronts Narendra Varma. So, he ploys by knitting Swati with Aakash and crafty demands for their entire wealth, which they cheerfully give up. Afterward, they shift to a little cottage and make cultivation their livelihood. At this stage, Swati restricts her brothers' visits to keep them away from ignominy.

Meanwhile, Rajeswari's father breaks the alliance, and Sivaramaraju goes bankrupt. However, Rajeswari omits her father and proceeds for Sivaramaraju. Accordingly, he marries her at Swati's residence, where Sivaramaraju faces the music but thresholds it with patience. For the time being, Swati conceives, yet she is subjected to bedevilment by her in-laws. Ramaraju nuptials his cousin Janaki, which Sivaramaraju smartly carries out before Swathi. Soon after, vainglory Janaki hostiles the joint family and swears to exact their happiness. However, the kin confronts it through their idolization when Janaki realizes her mistake. Parallelly, Raju falls for his collegian Rani, the daughter of an MP. Therein, Rani's brother Madan wallops Raju, and Sivaramaraju retaliates against him. Knowing it, MP moves on to wipe out the household. But shockingly, he bows down before the photograph of Sivaramarajus's father, Ananda Bhupathi Raju, and drives rearward.

Twenty-five years ago, Ananda Bhupathi was an arbiter esteemed as a deity. In his reign, that area is eternal from four sides. At that time, the MP was his subordinate, and he triumphed with his support. Once, Ananda Bhupathi verdicts and fastens Zamindar Veeraraju's daughter Rajyalakshmi with her love interest Ramakrishna, who belongs to a lower tier. Hence, fumed vicious Veeraraju conspires to kill the pair, but Ananda Bhupathi safeguards them. Since Veeraraju is unable to beat Ananda Bhupathi, he connives through genuflect. On the eve of the festival, Ananda Bhupati has a vow that he vouchsafes anything to one who prays before him. Herein, Veeraraju slyly implores for his head, which he bestows without hesitation, endorsing his authority and younger responsibility to infant Sivaramaraju. The sacred sacrifice of Ananda Bhupathi changed Veeraraju, too, who remains immortal in history.

Presently, MP accepts the espousal as a boon. During the wedding, Swati is forbidden and tormented by Aakash. By means, Sivaramarajus goes there, but miscreants batter them, showing danger to Swati. Whereat, furious Swati revolts and ends her relationship with Aakash by removing the wedding chain (Mangalasutram) and quits with her brothers. At last, Swati gives birth to a baby boy when Aakash and Narendra Varma reform and plead pardon. The movie ends happily with the reunion of the family.

== Cast ==
- Jagapati Babu as Siva Rama Raju
- Nandamuri Harikrishna as Ananda Bhupathi Raju
- Venkat as Rama Raju
- Sivaji as Raju
- Monica as Swathi
- Poonam Singar as Rajeswari
- Laya as Janaki
- Kanchi Kaul as Rani
- Pyramid Natarajan as Narendra Varma
- Anandaraj as Veeraju Varma
- Bramhanandam as Puliraju
- Dharmavarapu Subramanyam as Lecturer
- L.B. Sriram as Srisailam
- Rami Reddy as Rajeswari's father
- Kaushal Manda
- Tirupathi Prakash
- Dasari Arun Kumar in a special appearance in the song "Nirupedala Devudivaiah"
- Shiju as Swathi's husband
- Raghunatha Reddy
- Vizag Prasad as M.P
- Lakshmipati as Servant
- Gadiraju Subba Rao
- Chandra Mouli
- KK Sharma as Achari
- Madhu as Goon
- Varun as Ramakrishna
- Junior Relangi as Doctor
- Sathyapriya as Sivaramaraju's aunt
- Sana as Veeraju's wife
- Varsha as Rajyalakshmi
- Madhavi Sri
- Suman Sri

== Production ==
The house sets were built at Ramanaidu Studios.

== Soundtrack ==
Siva Rama Raju

Soundtrack album by S. A. Rajkumar
- Released: 2002
- Genre: Soundtrack
- Length: 28:31
- Label: Aditya Music
- Producer: S. A. Rajkumar

S. A. Rajkumar chronology
Nee Premakai (2002)	Siva Rama Raju (2002)	Vasantham (2003)

Music composed by S. A. Rajkumar and lyrics written by Chirravuri Vijay Kumar. Music released on Aditya Music Company. The audio was released at 11 October 2002 at Taj Banjara Hotel.

Other than "Ding Ding", all other songs were reused from Rajkumar's previous compositions from other Tamil films: "Andala Chinni" is based on "Azhagana Chinna Devathai" from Samudhiram (2001), "Pidugulu Padiponi" and "Amma Bhavani" were based on "Thaaye Thirisooli" from Tamil film Simmarasi (1998), "Nirupedala Devudivaiah" and "Swagatham" are based on "Thirunaalu Therazhaga" and "Kadhala Kadhala" from Surya Vamsam (1997), respectively.

The song "Ding Ding" was reused from "Kannum Kannum Paathukitta" in Sundara Travels by Bharani.

Telugu Cinema wrote "S. A. Raj Kumar’s songs always have a typical mark on them. These songs are not as impressive as his earlier hits, but can sound better and better as one keeps listening".

No.	Title	Singer(s)	Length
1.	"Andala Chinni Devatha"	Shankar Mahadevan, Sujatha	6:42
2.	"Ding Ding"	Udit Narayan, Sujatha	5:16
3.	"Amma Bhavani"	S. P. Balasubrahmanyam	6:06
4.	"Pidugulu Padiponi"	S. P. Balasubrahmanyam	2:33
5.	"Nirupedala Devudivaiah"	S. P. Balasubrahmanyam, Sujatha	4:22
6.	"Swagatham"	Udit Narayan, Sujatha	4:12
Total length:			28:31

== Reception ==
Idlebrain wrote "Sumudra's screenplay and direction is aimed at the masses and ladies. He tried capturing ladies territory with the sister sentiment and targeted masses with lots of forced mass elements. The way he projected these elements in the first half is sensible. But he could not handle the second half properly. At the same time, he tried encashing the L3 success by casting Hari Krishna in an extended flashback scene where Hari Krishna is shown for 25 minutes". Full Hyderabad wrote "Every single scene is loud, every emotion exaggerated and every frame is loaded with sentiment. It's a movie that you want to fastforward every time the male siblings fuss over their li'l sis, every time Harikrishna appears on screen, every time the songs are on and every time any fights are shown. In short, you want to FF the whole damn thing in one go". Telugu Cinema wrote "The director tried a family drama touching sister-brother sentiment with a not-very-impressive flashback. The first half of the film was okay, but the director failed to run the story in the second half in an appreciable way. The film would be fair as an average movie or below in B and C centers and will definitely disappoint the class audience".
