= Putham Pudhu Payanam =

- Theatrical release poster
- Directed by: K. S. Ravikumar
- Screenplay by: K. S. Ravikumar
- Story by: Erode Soundar
- Produced by: R. B. Choudary
- Starring: Anand Babu; Vivek; Chinni Jayanth; Supergood Kannan; K. S. Ravikumar; Chithra; Sukumari; Sulakshana
- Cinematography: Ashok Rajan
- Edited by: K. Thanikachalam
- Music by: Soundaryan
- Production company: Super Good Films
- Release date: 22 November 1991
- Running time: 130 minutes
- Country: India
- Language: Tamil

Putham Pudhu Payanam (transl. Brand New Journey) is a 1991 Indian Tamil-language film directed by K. S. Ravikumar and produced by R. B. Choudary. The film stars Anand Babu, Vivek, Chinni Jayanth, Supergood Kannan and Ravikumar. It was released on 22 November 1991.

== Plot ==
Vivek, Narayanan, and Kannan—three youths are admitted to the same hospital ward for treatment. With the help of the room boy, 'All in All' Arumugam, they drink, smoke, and enjoy without the knowledge of the chief doctor, Dr. M. Kumaresan. Babu, the son of a busy businessman, joins them in the ward. Initially, the trio avoids Babu and tries unsuccessfully to get rid of him. Narayanan's MLA father and Kannan's single mother visit the hospital, unintentionally highlighting Vivek's loneliness as an orphan. Babu consoles Vivek, and the four gradually bond together. Babu invites them to his birthday party, where they also bring girls from the nearby hostel.

The hostel warden confronts Dr. Kumaresan, demanding that the boys be arrested. Kumaresan reveals the truth: all four are suffering from blood cancer and have only a few months to live, though they remain unaware, believing they will recover. The boys overhear this conversation and are devastated. They decide to leave the hospital and live fully until their deaths. Before departing, they learn that their kind nurse's husband needs heart surgery but lacks funds. The four give their valuables to Arumugam to help pay for the operation. The grateful nurse returns dressed as they had once playfully requested, only to find a note stating they had left the hospital without informing anyone.

The friends arrive at a small village, where they rescue Saravanan, an employee of an old, blind potter woman, Ponnuthayee, from the men of a tyrant, Sivalingam. Saravanan later succumbs to his injuries. The friends learn that Sivalingam terrorizes the villagers and ritualistically tonsures his head after killing anyone who opposes him. Though threatened to leave, the four refuse, while Ponnuthayee adopts the four as her grandsons and shelters them, supported only by the washerman Varathan. Enraged, Sivalingam assaults Varathan and threatens his pregnant wife. The friends intervene and beat Sivalingam's men. Sivalingam attempts to buy them off with money, but they distribute it among the villagers instead. When Ponnuthayee's granddaughter Nirmala, is bitten by a snake, the four stay awake all night caring for her. Raised solely, Nirmala begins treating them as her brothers. She is also in love with Kumar, Sivalingam's son. Also, Babu's cancer worsens. Back at the hospital, the friends' families confront Dr. Kumaresan about their missing sons.

In the village, Kumar prevents his father's men from burning Ponnuthayee's hut, angering Sivalingam. When Sivalingam discovers his ring on Nirmala's finger, he realizes her relationship with Kumar and warns her to stay away from him. The four confront Sivalingam's family and challenge him to accept the marriage, but he is away. His wife, Raani, pleads with them to leave. Upon returning, Sivalingam vows to destroy the friends and their families. Meanwhile, Arumugam arrives in the village to meet Varathan and decides to stay. Vivek's illness also begins to worsen. The friends learn that Sivalingam has been looting temple treasures and had framed Saravanan as a thief before killing him. They organize a village panchayat to expose the corruption. Arumugam recognizes the four, which Sivalingam's henchman Kalaiyan notices and reports. Feigning innocence, Sivalingam hands over a fake temple key to the friends.

Despite this, the four renovate the temple, earning the villagers' trust. Soon after, Nirmala and Kumar are caught together. Sivalingam beats Kumar and orders Nirmala to be stripped, stopping only after Kumar's pleas. With Raani's help, Nirmala sneaks in to see the injured Kumar, but both are caught. Sivalingam forces Raani to injure herself with a heated iron and hands Nirmala over to Kalaiyan. Varathan alerts Babu, who confronts Kalaiyan. Despite vomiting blood, Babu defeats Kalaiyan. Seeking revenge, Sivalingam plants the stolen temple deity in Ponnuthayee's house to frame the friends. Realizing the trap, they attempt to return the idol to the temple before dawn. Babu, weakened, stays behind while the others carry the statue. They are caught by villagers, mistaken for thieves, and brutally beaten. When Babu rushes to help, he too is attacked. Kumar arrives and reveals that his father is the real culprit who still possesses the temple's original key.

Realizing the truth, the villagers rise against Sivalingam. In rage, Sivalingam assaults Raani and kidnaps the villagers' children, locking them inside his house and setting it on fire. Babu urges Nirmala and Kumar to escape, but they are captured. Sivalingam drags Nirmala to a cliff, intending to kill her. Determined to save her, Babu rallies his friends, and together they fight Sivalingam and his men, suffering injuries. Raani regains consciousness and pours water on the fire, enabling the villagers to rescue their children. During the struggle, Sivalingam pushes Nirmala off the cliff, but Babu catches her. As they hang, Narayanan loses his hand trying to save them. To end Sivalingam's reign, Vivek and Kannan charge at him, pushing him off the cliff and falling with him. Witnessing their deaths, Babu dies from shock. Before dying, Narayanan manages to hold onto Nirmala, preventing her from falling. The villagers rescue Nirmala.

The film ends with the married Kumar and Nirmala offering flowers at the graves of the four friends. Nirmala gives Kumar Babu's bracelet as a symbol of their sacrifice. The village mourns the four heroes alongside their families, as Dr. Kumaresan, the nurse, Arumugam, and the widowed Raani attend the ceremony.

== Cast ==
- Anand Babu as Babu
- Chinni Jayanth as Narayanan
- Vivek as Vivek
- Supergood Kannan as Kannan
- Mohankumar as Kumar
- Kumarimuthu as 'All in All' Arumugam
- Erode Sounder as Varathan
- Nirmala Shyam as Nirmala
- Sukumari as Ponnuthayee
- Sulakshana as Raani, Sivalingam's wife
- Vijayachandrika as Narayanan's mother
- Indiradevi as Kannan's mother
- Anuja as Varathan's wife
- Kango as Kalaiyan
- Nagesh in a guest appearance as Dr. M. Kumaresan, the chief doctor
- Chithra as a nurse
- V. Gopalakrishnan as Babu's father
- M. R. Krishnamurthy as Narayanan's father
- Loose Mohan as Loose
- K. S. Ravikumar as Sivalingam
- Thideer Kannaiah as a hospital patient (uncredited role)

== Soundtrack ==
The music was composed by Soundaryan, who also wrote the lyrics.

| Song | Singer | Duration |
|---|---|---|
| "Ye Penne Nee" | S. P. Balasubrahmanyam, Malaysia Vasudevan | 4:57 |
| "Padungale Paar" | K. J. Yesudas, Labson Rajkumar | 4:47 |
| "Malligai Poo" | Mano, K. S. Chithra | 4:55 |
| "Ye Kaalai Pani" | K. J. Yesudas | 4:52 |
| "Kottu Kottu" | Mano, Swarnalatha | 5:12 |
| "Pattuvanna Selai" | S. P. Balasubrahmanyam | 4:50 |
| "Mathalam Kottuthadi" | S. P. Balasubrahmanyam | 4:54 |

== Release and reception ==
Putham Pudhu Payanam was released on 22 November 1991. N. Krishnaswamy of The Indian Express positively reviewed the film, saying it proved that "commercially viable films can be made with a small cast without stars".
