= Tamil Nadu State Film Award for Best Story Writer =

Indian film award

The Tamil Nadu State Film Award for Best Storywriter is given by the state government as part of its annual Tamil Nadu State Film Awards for Tamil (Kollywood) films.

== List of winners ==
List of winners and nominated work
Year	Recipient	Film
1967	A. C. Tirulokchandar	Iru Malargal
1968	Kothamangalam Subbu	Thillaanaa Mohanambal
1969	Balamurugan	Thunaivan
1970	Poovannan	Namma Kuzhanthaigal
1971	No Award	
1972	No Award	
1973	No Award	
1974	No Award	
1975	No Award	
1976	No Award	
1977–78	V. C. Guhanathan	Madhurageetham
1978–79	Jayakanthan	Karunai Ullam
1979–80	Jegadeesan	Thisai Maariya Paravaigal
1980–81	M. A. Abbas	Sooravali
1981–82	Manivannan	Alaigal Oivathillai
1982–83	Arun Mozhi	Ezhavathu Manithan
1983	No Award	
1984	No Award	
1985	No Award	
1986	No Award	
1987	No Award	
1988	R. B. Vishwam	Sigappu Thaali
1989	R. Parthiban	Pudhiya Paathai
1990	Visu	Varavu Nalla Uravu
1991	Erode Soundar	Cheran Pandiyan
1992	K. Balachander	Vaaname Ellai
1993	Sujatha Udhayakumar	Ponnumani, Yejaman
1994	Erode Soundar	Nattamai
1995	K. Bhagyaraj	Thaikulame Thaikulame
1996	Kalanjiyam	Poomani
1997	No Award	
1998	Vikraman	Unnidathil Ennai Koduthen
1999	Rajakumaran	Nee Varuvai Ena
2000	Manoj Kumar	Vanathai Pola
2001	Sara Aboobacker	Jameela
2002	Susi Ganesan	Five Star
2003	Samuthirakani	Unnai Charanadainthen
2004	Hariram	Uyirosai
2005	Karu Pazhaniappan	Sadhurangam
2006	Perarasu	Thirupathi
2007	Vasanth	Satham Podathey
2008	Tamilselvan	Poo
2009	Cheran	Pokkisham
2010	R. Sargunam	Kalavani
2011	Radha Mohan	Payanam
2012	S. R. Prabhakaran	Sundarapandian
2013	Balu Mahendra	Thalaimuraigal
2014	H. Vinoth	Sathuranga Vettai
2015	Mohan Raja	Thani Oruvan
