= Paramashiva (film) =

- Directed by: Mahesh Babu
- Written by: Erode Soundar
- Based on: Samudhiram
- Produced by: Anaji Nagaraj
- Starring: V. Ravichandran; Sakshi Shivanand; Saranya Mohan; Vijay Raghavendra
- Cinematography: Anaji Nagaraj
- Edited by: Vinod Manohar
- Music by: Songs: Arjun Janya; Score: S. A. Rajkumar
- Production company: Veera Films
- Release date: 12 September 2014
- Running time: 140 minutes
- Country: India
- Language: Kannada

Paramashiva is a 2014 Indian Kannada-language musical drama film directed by Mahesh Babu and produced by Anaji Nagaraj. It stars V. Ravichandran, Saranya Mohan, Sakshi Sivanand and Vijay Raghavendra. The film revolves around the bond between a brother and sister, and the emotional challenges they face as their lives progress.

The film is a remake of the Tamil film Samudhiram (2001), with a subplot borrowed from another Tamil film, Simmarasi (1998), similar to the pattern followed by the 2002 Telugu film Siva Rama Raju. Originally slated for release in 2011, the film experienced delays and was eventually released on 12 September 2014, due to the producer's other commitments.

== Plot ==
Three brothers, Shiva, Raghu and Shankar, dote on their sister, Swati, and strive for her happiness. Problems arise when Swati marries a cunning, rich man who has ulterior motives.

== Cast ==
- V. Ravichandran as Shiva
- Sakshi Shivanand
- Saranya Mohan as Swathi
- Vijay Raghavendra as Raghu
- Srujan Lokesh as Chandrashekar
- Yashas as Shankar
- Rekha Vedavyas
- Ramesh Bhat
- Sadhu Kokila
- Sathyapriya

== Soundtrack ==
All songs were composed and scored by Arjun Janya.

Sl No	Song title	Singer(s)	Lyrics
1	"Paramashiva"	Kailash Kher	V. Ravichandran
2	"Hannagabeku Kaayi"	Rajesh Krishnan	
3	"Hege Nee Bande"	Rajesh Krishnan	V. Ravichandran
4	"Rajakumari"	Rajesh Krishnan	V. Ravichandran

== Reception ==
Critics were not kind to the film. A critic from Bangalore Mirror wrote, "It is not every week that you get to be disappointed so much from a star movie. To know why, watch Paramashiva just once." A critic from The New Indian Express wrote that "Paramashiva has hit the screens a decade too late. Those who loved Ravichandran in Drishya can skip this."
