= Sengottai (film) =

- Poster
- Directed by: C. V. Sasikumar
- Written by: C. V. Sasikumar
- Produced by: R. B. Choudary
- Starring: Arjun Sarja; Meena; Rambha
- Cinematography: V. Manikandan
- Edited by: B. Ramesh
- Music by: Vidyasagar
- Production company: Super Good Films
- Release date: 19 April 1996
- Running time: 150 minutes
- Country: India
- Language: Tamil

Sengottai (transl. Red Fort) is a 1996 Indian Tamil-language political action film directed by C. V. Shanmugam and produced by R. B. Choudary. The film stars Arjun Sarja, Meena and Rambha. It was released on 19 April 1996, and bombed at the box-office.

== Plot ==
Thirumoorthy is a corrupt politician who aspires to become the Prime Minister of India (PM) and hires a terrorist to kill the current PM. However, Thirumoorthy's plans get foiled by SP Sekhar, who kills the terrorists and catches the leader. Neelakandan is an orthodox Brahmin and Sekhar's father's best friend, who, along with Sekhar's father, decides to marry his son to Neelakandan's daughter Meena, but Sekhar is in love with Yamuna. One day, Sekhar is appointed to find Franka, an Indo-French girl who arrived in India to learn about the country's culture. A sniper misses killing Sekhar at the time, but accidentally kills Yamuna.

Meena is imprisoned as she is considered to have killed Franka. Sekhar invites Thirumoorthy for Gandhi Jayanti to prison, where Meena attempts to kill him. The same killer who killed Yamuna tries to kill Meena, but Sekhar saves her. Sekhar enquires Meena, who reveals the truth. Franka's handbag was robbed, with her passport inside it. Meena and Franka complain at the police station. Thirumoorthy lusted after Franka, where he forcefully had sex and killed her. Thangamani, a police officer, promised Meena that he would arrest the culprit, and first prevented his partner Thirumoorthy. Thangamani arrested Meena, and the villagers humiliated her family, where Meena's family have self-immolated.

Learning this, Sekhar marries Meena in prison, and she is released on bail. Sekhar is unable to arrest Thirumoorthy because it would cause a black mark for his country. Thangamani refuses to provide information to Sekhar, who later beats Thangamani. Thangamani reveals all about Thirumoorthy. However, a hitman kills Thangamani and kidnaps Sekhar. Thirumoorthy threatens Sekhar to kill his father and Meena if he does not kill the PM himself. Sekhar is escorted by Thirumoorthy's henchmen on the plane, but manages to escape from there and finds the place where his father and Meena are kept, and saves them. To save the PM, Sekhar finds the sniper and kills him. Thirumoorthy decides to kill the PM, but Sekhar saves him and kills Thirumoorthy.

== Cast ==
- Arjun Sarja as SP Sekhar IPS
- Meena as Meena
- Rambha as Yamuna (Voice over by Rohini
- Vijayakumar as Sekhar's father
- Rajan P. Dev as Thirumoorthy
- Hemanth Ravan
- Delhi Ganesh as Neelakanda, Meena's father
- Jayanthi as Meena's mother
- Kumarimuthu
- Anandaraj as Inspector Thangamani
- Roshan Seth as Prime Minister
- Sethu Vinayagam
- Franka as Franka

Cameo appearances

- Chinni Jayanth
- Vadivelu

== Soundtrack ==
The music was composed by Vidyasagar.

Song	Singer(s)	Lyrics	Duration
"Boomiyea Boomiyea"	S. P. Balasubrahmanyam, S. Janaki	Vairamuthu	5:19
"Paadu Paadu"	K. S. Chithra, Anuradha Sriram	Muthulingam	4:36
"Uchchi Muthal Patham"	Hariharan, Mitali Banerjee Bhawmik	Palani Bharathi	5:06
"Vennilave Velli Poove"	Mano, K. S. Chithra	Vaali	4:06
"Vinnum Mannum"	Mano, Swarnalatha	Vaali	4:35

== Critical reception ==
Tharamani of Kalki praised Yogamagi's art direction and Manikandan's cinematography and the performances of Meena and her friend. He also added the screenplay in first half is yawn inducing however despite picking up pace in second half its let down by illogical sequences. D. S. Ramanujam of The Hindu wrote, "Arjun never puts a wrong foot forward, at his agile best in the action scenes and dancing and romancing with his known flourish, the Taj Mahal and other picturesque places in Agra making the frames look enchanting through Manikantan's cinematography".
