= Ravishankar Devanarayanan =

Indian dubbing artist

- Born: Ravishankar; 24 June
- Occupation: Voice actor
- Parent: Devanarayanan (father)
- Relatives: Kolathu Iyer (grandfather)

Ravishankar Devanarayanan also known as Ravishankar is a dubbing artist in the Southern Indian film industry. He lent his voice to Tamil industry and Hollywood actors like Robert Downey Jr. and Tom Cruise.

== Career ==
Ravi was born in Tamil Family. His father Devanarayanan worked under actor Kamal Haasan and ravi's grandfather Kolathu Iyer lendind his voice 1943 Hindi film Ram Rajya, when it film was dubbed and released into Tamil in 1948 named as Rama Rajiyam under AVM Productions. Ravi lending his voice Baasha for Shashikumar's (he played Rajinikanth brother) and Sangamam for actor Rahman's character. His other major work in Tamil Minnale and Padayappa lending his voice for Abbas, Aahaa..! lending voice to Rajiv Krishna. He majorly dubbed in Tamil films and gave Tamil voice to Telugu, Hindi and English dubbed films including famous - Marvel Cinematic Universe films as Iron Man and Avengers films for Iron Man actor Robert Downey Jr. and also he lent his voice Fast and Furious (franchise) for actor Paul Walker. Initially actor Vijay Sethupathi dubbed his voice for Robert Downey Jr. as Tony Stark character for the movie Avengers: Endgame it was received several critical acclaims from audience, laterly Ravi lent his voice Tony stark.

== Dubbing artist ==
=== Films ===
==== Tamil films ====
Year	Film	Role	Actors	Ref(s)
1987	Pookkal Vidum Thoothu		Harish Kumar	
1990	Kavithai Paadum Alaigal		Rajmohan	
1990	Pudhu Pudhu Ragangal		Charan Raj	
1990	Nyayangal Jayikkattum		Vinod Kumar	
1991	Jodi Senthachu		Sriram	
1991	Gnana Paravai		Harish Kumar	
1991	Moondrezhuthil En Moochirukkum		Srinivas Varma	
1992	Ennarukil Nee Irunthal		Chi. Guru Dutt	
1992	Agni Paarvai		Ramkumar	
1992	Eeramana Rojave		Shiva	
1992	Chinna Marumagal		Shiva	
1992	Mudhal Seethanam		Shiva	
1992	Pudhusa Padikkiren Paattu		Gautham	
1992	Annai Vayal		Raj Murali	
1992	Chinna Thayee		Vignesh	
1993	Walter Vetrivel	Sundaram	Raj Chander	
1994	Vaa Magale Vaa		Veerapandiyan	
1994	Pudhupatti Ponnuthaayi		Sanjay Bhargav	
1994	Padikkatha Vaathiyar		Chandrakanth	
1995	Baashha	Shiva	Shashi Kumar	
1995	Anbu Magan		Bharath Kumar	
1995	Mannukku Mariyadhai		Vignesh	
1995	Ilavarasi		Raj Chander	
1995	Mogamul		Abhishek Shankar	
1996	Mappillai Manasu Poopola		Rajneesh Kumar	
1997	Aahaa..!	Sriram	Rajiv Krishna	
1997	Devathai		Vineeth	
1998	Simmarasi		Vineeth	
1999	Padayappa	Chandraprakash aka Chandru	Abbas	
1999	Annan		Seenu	
1999	Suyamvaram		Vineeth	
1999	Sangamam	Selvam	Rahman	
2000	Kadhal Rojavae		George Vishnu	
2000	Good Luck		Sanjay Asrani	
2001	12B	Aravind	Sunil Shetty	
2002	En Mana Vaanil		Indrajith Sukumaran	
2002	Yai! Nee Romba Azhaga Irukke!		Rajiv Krishna	
2002	Enge Enadhu Kavithai		Kunal	
2002	Bala		Shaam	
2003	Kadhaludan		Abbas	
2003	Lesa Lesa		Shaam	
2003	Parasuram		Abbas	
2003	Iyarkai		Shaam	
2003	Priyamana Thozhi	Michael	Vineeth	
2003	Well Done		Jayanth	
2004	Azhagiya Theeye	Chandran's friend	Harris Moosa	
2005	Girivalam		Shaam	
2005	Aayudham		Subburaju	
2005	Kannamma		Prem Kumar	
2006	Kizhakku Kadarkarai Salai		Suresh	
2006	Nenjirukkum Varai		Subbaraju	
2006	Aacharya		Vignesh	
2007	Pokkiri		Subbaraju	
2008	Sadhu Miranda		Abbas	
2009	Guru En Aalu		Abbas	
2009	Sarvam		J. D. Chakravarthy	
2010	Kathai		Shaan Kumar	
2011	Ko	Vasanth	Ajmal Ameer	
2011	Vithagan		Milind Soman	
2011	Eththan	Pandiyan	Sarvajit	
2013	Samar		J. D. Chakravarthy	
2013	Karuppampatti		Ajmal Ameer	
2014	Vetri Selvan		Ajmal Ameer	
2019	Kaaviyyan		Shaam	

==== Tamil dubbed films ====
Year	Movie	Role	Actors	Original language	Ref(s)
1989	Licence to Kill	James Bond	Timothy Dalton	English	
1989	Indiana Jones and the Last Crusade	Indiana Jones	Harrison Ford	English	
1989	Vallavan		Siddique	Malayalam	
1990	Udhayam	JD	J. D. Chakravarthy	Telugu	
1990	Indran Chandran	Doctor	Pradeep Sakthi	Telugu	
1993	Police Attack		Harish Kumar	Telugu	
1993	Durga Poojai		Raghuveer	Kannada	
1994	Commissioner	Prasad	K. B. Ganesh Kumar	Malayalam	
1995	The King		Vijayaraghavan	Malayalam	
1996	Mission: Impossible	Eugene Kittridge	Henry Czerny	English	
1996	Idhayame Idhayame		JD Chakravarthy	Telugu	
1996	Andru Oru Naal		JD Chakravarthy	Telugu	
1997	Con Air	Cameron Poe	Nicolas Cage	English	
1997	Time Bomb		Shashikumar	Kannada	
1998	Small Soldiers	Chip Hazard	Tommy Lee Jones	English	
1999	The Mummy	Rick O'Connell	Brendan Fraser	English	
1999	Kaaki Sattaiya Karuppu Sattaiya		Suman	Kannada	
1999	F. I. R.		Biju Menon	Malayalam	
1999	Lady Tiger		Avinash	Kannada	
1999	Asterix & Obelix Take On Caesar	Lucius Detritus	Roberto Benigni	French	
2000	Mission: Impossible 2	Ethan Hunt	Tom Cruise	English	
2000	Gandhi	Jawaharlal Nehru	Roshan Seth	English	
2000	Gladiator		Joaquin Phoenix	English	
2000	Nee Indri Naan Illai		Vineeth	Kannada	
2001	Kanden Seethaiye	Surendra	Vikram	Telugu	
2001	The Mummy Returns	Rick O'Connell	Brendan Fraser	English	
2001	Vetri		Venkatesh	Telugu	
2001	Lara Croft: Tomb Raider	Mr. Pimms	Julian Rhind-Tutt	English	
2002	Die Another Day	James Bond	Pierce Brosnan	English	
2003	Finding Nemo	Marlin (Ocellaris Clownfish)	Albert Brooks	English	
2003	Kalam		Dileep	Malayalam	
2003	Daredevil	Matt Murdock / Daredevil	Ben Affleck	English	
2004	Van Helsing	Gabriel Van Helsing	Hugh Jackman	English	
2004	Hellboy	Abe Sapien	Doug Jones	English	
2005	King Kong		Adrian Brodo	English	
2006	Dhoom 2	Aryan/Mr. A	Hrithik Roshan	Hindi	
2006	Krrish	Rohit Mehra/Krishna "Krrish" Mehra	Hrithik Roshan	Hindi	
2006	Mission: Impossible III	Ethan Hunt	Tom Cruise	English	
2007	Transformers	Capt. William Lennox	Josh Duhamel	English	
2007	Lakshyam	Ganesh	Prabhu Deva	Telugu	
2008	The Mummy: Tomb of the Dragon Emperor	Rick O'Connell	Brendan Fraser	English	
2008	Iron Man	Tony Stark / Iron Man	Robert Downey Jr.	English	
2008	The Incredible Hulk	Tony Stark / Iron Man	Robert Downey Jr.	English	
2008	The Dark Knight	Bruce Wayne / Batman	Christian Bale	English	
2008	Hellboy II: The Golden Army	Abe Sapien	Doug Jones	English	
2008	Jodhaa Akbar	Mann Singh	Sonu Sood	English	
2008	Wanted	Wesley Gibson	James McAvoy	English	
2009	Fast & Furious	Brian O'Conner	Paul Walker	English	
2009	G.I. Joe: The Rise of Cobra	Stone (G.I. Joe)	Brendan Fraser	English	
2009	Transformers: Revenge of the Fallen	Capt. William Lennox	Josh Duhamel	English	
2010	Iron Man 2	Tony Stark / Iron Man	Robert Downey Jr.	English	
2010	Inception	Dom Cobb	Leonardo DiCaprio	English	
2011	Transformers: Dark of the Moon	Capt. William Lennox	Josh Duhamel	English	
2011	Spy Kids: All the Time in the World	Ricky Gervais	Robot dog	English	
2011	Mission: Impossible – Ghost Protocol	Ethan Hunt	Tom Cruise	English	
2012	The Avengers	Tony Stark / Iron Man	Robert Downey Jr.	English	
2012	The Dark Knight Rises	Bruce Wayne / Batman	Christian Bale	English	
2012	Chatrapathi		Prabhas	Telugu	
2013	Fast & Furious 6	Brian O'Conner	Paul Walker	English	
2013	Krrish 3	Rohit/Krrish	Hrithik Roshan	Hindi	
2013	Shadow		Venkatesh	Telugu	
2013	Iron Man 3	Tony Stark / Iron Man	Robert Downey Jr.	English	
2014	Bang Bang!	Rajveer Nanda/Jai Nanda	Hrithik Roshan	Hindi	
2015	Avengers: Age of Ultron	Tony Stark / Iron Man	Robert Downey Jr.	English	
2015	Mission: Impossible – Rogue Nation	Ethan Hunt	Tom Cruise	English	
2016	Fantastic Beasts and Where to Find Them	Percival Graves	Colin Farrell	English	
2016	Captain America: Civil War	Tony Stark / Iron Man	Robert Downey Jr.	English	
2016	Finding Dory	Marlin (Ocellaris Clownfish)	Fish	English	
2016	Batman v Superman: Dawn of Justice	Clark Kent / Superman	Henry Cavill	English	
2017	Kaabil	Rohan Bhatnagar	Hrithik Roshan	Hindi	
2017	Raja The Great		Ravi Teja	Tamil	
2017	Transformers: The Last Knight	Capt. William Lennox	Josh Duhamel	English	
2017	Spider-Man: Homecoming	Tony Stark / Iron Man	Robert Downey Jr.	English	
2017	Justice League	Clark Kent / Superman	Henry Cavill	English	
2018	Black Panther	Young T'Chaka	Atandwa Kani	English	
2018	Avengers: Infinity War	Tony Stark / Iron Man	Robert Downey Jr.	English	
2018	Mission: Impossible – Fallout	Ethan Hunt	Tom Cruise	English	
2018	Venom	Eddie Brock / Venom	Tom Hardy	English	
2019	Spider-Man: Far From Home	Tony Stark / Iron Man	Robert Downey Jr.	English	
2019	Hellboy	Hellboy	David Harbour	English	
2019	Frozen II	Agnarr	Alfred Molina	English	
2019	Vinaya Vidheya Rama		Prashanth	Telugu	
2022	Athidi		Mahesh Babu	Telugu	Athidi was originally dubbed and released in Tamil as Thanikattu Raja in 2008 in which Mahesh Babu's voice was dubbed by different voice artist. When this film was dubbed again in Tamil in 2022, Ravishankar dubbed his voice for Mahesh Babu.
2022	Black Adam	Doctor Fate / Clark Kent / Superman	Pierce Brosnan / Henry Cavill	English	
2023	Waltair Veerayya	Veerayya	Chiranjeevi	Tamil	
2024	Mr. Bachchan		Ravi Teja	Telugu	

=== Serials ===
==== Tamil dubbed TV shows ====
Year	series	Role	actor	Ref(s)
2019	Sai Baaba	Shirdi Sai baba	Abeer Sofi	
2020	Pawn Stars	Rick Harrison		

==== Tamil serials ====
Actor	Series	Ref(s)
Ravishankar	Premi, Jannal Adutha Veettu Kavithaigal	
Nandha	Premi	
Sathish	Guhan, Anandham, Athi Pookal, Gokulathil Seethai, Annakodiyum Ainthu Pengalum	
Eeramana Rojave Shiva	Kavyanjali; Kasturi; Hello Shyamala, Roja, Maari	
Jayakrishnan	Kasthuri, Namma Kudumbam	
Vijay Adhiraj	Poovilangu	
Akash	Kelunga Mamiyare Neengalum Marumagal Than	
Bhanuchander	Kanaa Kaanum Kaalangal, Karthigai Pengal	
Seenu	All Tamil Serials except Namma Kudumbam	
Mithun Tejaswi	Apoorva Raagangal	
Vallabh	Mahabharatam	
Lakshmi Raj	Valli, Chandralekha; Mahalakshmi; Abhiyum Naanum	
Sasindhar	Roja	
Satish (Gopi)	Baakiyalaxmi	
Harish Uthaman	Kolangal	
Zianudeen	Kolangal	
Abhishek Shankar	Anupallavi; Kolangal (for some episodes); Thangam; Pudhu Pudhu Arthangal	
Vignesh	Velammal	
Madhu Mohan	Karthigai Deepam	

Television shows

Show	Channel	Ref(s)
Aalaya Dharisanam	Vasanth TV	
