= Cinema Express =

Indian Tamil-language entertainment fortnightly magazine, since 1980

- Magazine cover of Cinema Express 16 February 2016 featuring actress Anjali
- Categories: Cinema news
- Frequency: Fortnightly
- Founded: 1980
- First issue: 18 January 1980
- Final issue: 16 February 2016
- Company: The New Indian Express Group
- Country: India
- Based in: Chennai
- Language: Tamil
- Website: www.cinemaexpress.com

Cinema Express was an Indian Tamil-language entertainment fortnightly magazine published from Chennai, Tamil Nadu. It was a part of Indian Express Group, and released its first issue in January 1980. Cinema Express also honoured artistic excellence of professionals in the Indian film industry through the Cinema Express Awards. The magazine was discontinued in February 2016. The Cinema Express name was later revived for the division of the Indian Express Group that covers the film industry.

== History ==
Cinema Express came out with their first issue on 10 January 1980 and had the last on 16 February 2016. Afterwards, the Indian Express Group revived the name Cinema Express for the division that publishes information related to cinema.

== See also ==
- Cinema Express Awards
