= Namma Kuzhandaigal =

1970 film directed by Srikanth

- Theatrical release poster
- Directed by: Srikanth
- Based on: Aalam Vizhudhu by Poovannan
- Produced by: D. Ramanaidu
- Starring: Major Sundarrajan; Pandari Bai; Vennira Aadai Nirmala
- Music by: M. S. Viswanathan
- Production companies: Vijaya & Suresh Combines
- Release date: 27 February 1970
- Country: India
- Language: Tamil

Namma Kuzhandaigal (transl. Our children) is a 1970 Indian Tamil-language children's drama film directed by Srikanth and produced by D. Ramanaidu. It is based on writer Poovannan's novel Aalam Vizhudhu. The film stars Major Sundarrajan, Pandari Bai and Vennira Aadai Nirmala. It was released on 27 February 1970, and won three Tamil Nadu State Film Awards: Third Best Film, Best Female Playback Singer for S. Janaki, and Best Story Writer for Poovannan.

== Cast ==
- Major Sundarrajan
- Pandari Bai
- Vennira Aadai Nirmala
- Master Sridhar
- S. N. Surendar
- Prabhakar
- Master Sekhar
- Roja Ramani
- Leela Jayalakshmi

== Production ==
Namma Kuzhandaigal is based on writer Poovannan's novel Aalam Vizhudhu. It was directed by Srikanth and produced by D. Ramanaidu under Vijaya & Suresh Combines, while the dialogues were written by Thuraiyur K. Murthi. The final cut of the film was 4,308.03 metres (14,134.0 ft).

== Soundtrack ==
The soundtrack was composed by M. S. Viswanathan, while the lyrics were written by Kannadasan.

Track listing
No.	Title	Singer(s)	Length
1.	"Seethakkalappa"	Sirkazhi Govindarajan	6:45
2.	"Radhaiyai"	S. Janaki	3:24
Total length:			10:09

== Release and reception ==
Namma Kuzhandaigal was released on 27 February 1970. The Indian Express said the following day, "To inculcate values prudence, simplicity and honesty in children the movie has meandered into three tracts. Even so the first half of the film is very gripping. In the second half there are many unnecessary incidents and characters not related to the children's film. If one can ignore these it is recommendable film. The attempt is laudable." At the Tamil Nadu State Film Awards, the film won the following awards: Best Story Writer for Poovannan, Third Best Film, and Best Female Playback Singer for S. Janaki.
