= Baashha =

1995 Indian film by Suresh Krissna

- Theatrical release poster
- Directed by: Suresh Krissna
- Screenplay by: Suresh Krissna
- Dialogue by: Balakumaran
- Produced by: R. M. Veerappan (presenter); V. Rajammal; V. Thamilazhagan
- Starring: Rajinikanth; Nagma; Raghuvaran
- Cinematography: P. S. Prakash
- Edited by: Ganesh Kumar
- Music by: Deva
- Production company: Sathya Movies
- Release date: 12 January 1995
- Running time: 144 minutes
- Country: India
- Language: Tamil

Baashha (transl. Emperor) (Note: Also the title character.) is a 1995 Indian Tamil-language gangster action film written and directed by Suresh Krissna. The film stars Rajinikanth, Nagma and Raghuvaran, with Janagaraj, Devan, Shashi Kumar, Vijayakumar, Anandaraj, Charan Raj, Kitty, Sathyapriya, Shenbaga and Yuvarani in supporting roles. It revolves around an auto rickshaw driver who maintains a humble exterior and avoids violence but conceals a dark past from his family.

During the making of Annaamalai (1992), Rajinikanth and Krissna discussed a scene from the former's Hindi film Hum (1991), which was not filmed. The story of Baashha and the film's core plot were adapted from that scene. Principal photography began in August 1994 and was completed in less than five months. P. S. Prakash was the cinematographer, and it was edited by Ganesh Kumar. The dialogues were scripted by Balakumaran. The music was composed by Deva and the lyrics were penned by Vairamuthu.

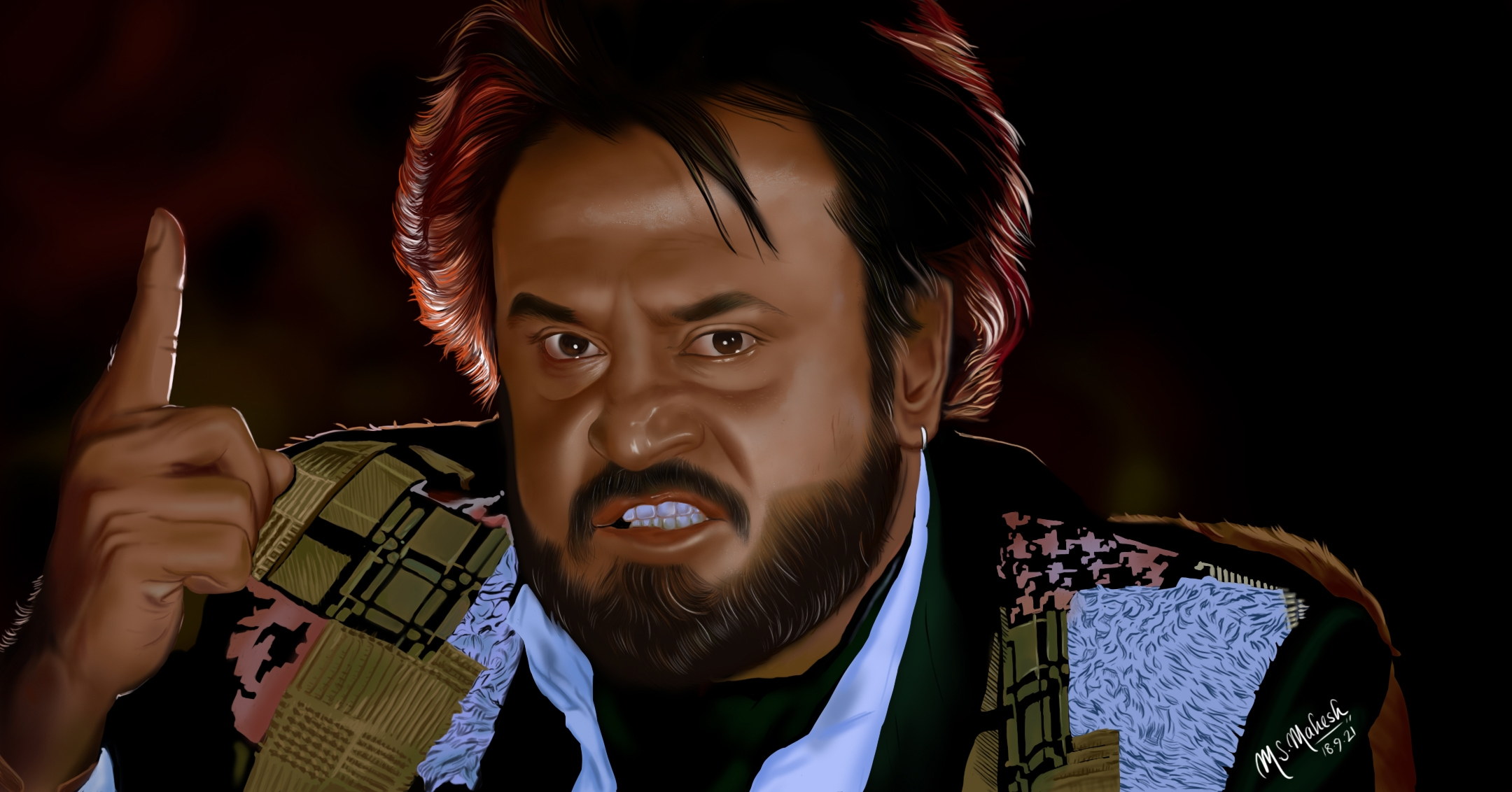
A digital sketch of Rajinikanth as Manik Baashha.

Baashha was released on 12 January 1995 with positive feedback and became one of the most successful films in Rajinikanth's career, running for nearly 15 months in theatres. Rajinikanth won the Filmfans Association Award and the Cinema Express Award for Best Actor for his performance. The film was remade in Kannada as Kotigobba (2001) and in Bengali as Guru (2003). The film was also remade twice in Bangladesh—as Sultan in 2001 and as Manik Badsha in 2003. A digitally restored version of the film was released in 2017, and a remastered version was in 2025.

== Plot ==
Manikam is a humble auto-rickshaw driver living in Madras with his mother, Vijayalakshmi, his sisters, Geetha and Kavitha, and his brother, Shiva. He is deeply committed to his family's welfare, successfully arranging Kavitha's marriage into an affluent family and supporting Shiva in becoming a Sub-Inspector of police. When the interviewing DIG, Dinakar, sees Manikam's photograph, he immediately recognizes him and requests a meeting, though a hesitant Manikam avoids the encounter, raising Dinakar's suspicions. Later, when a corrupt medical college chairman demands sexual favors from Geetha in exchange for admission, Manikam confronts him privately. After a brief, unheard conversation behind closed doors, the terrified chairman unconditionally grants Geetha her seat.

Meanwhile, a wealthy young woman named Priya frequently rides in Manikam's auto-rickshaw and falls in love with his honorable character. After discovering that her father, Kesavan, is a smuggler, she distances herself from her family and proposes to Manikam. He initially declines upon learning she is Kesavan's daughter but eventually accepts her love. Tensions arise in the city due to Indiran, a ruthless gangster who extorts local businesses. When Shiva arrests and beats two of Indiran's henchmen for extortion, Indiran retaliates by threatening Shiva. Manikam intervenes to protect his brother, voluntarily allowing himself to be tied to a pole and brutally beaten by Indiran without fighting back. However, when Shiva locks Indiran up again, the enraged gangster kidnaps Geetha upon his release and attempts to molest her in public. Breaking his vow of non-violence, Manikam subdues Indiran and his entire gang. The sheer ferocity of the beating shocks Shiva, who demands to know the truth about Manikam's mysterious past in Bombay, forcing Manikam to reflect on his history.

In a flashback, Manikam lives with his parents in Bombay while his siblings study in Madras. His father, Rangasamy, is an honest man bound by absolute loyalty to his employer, the powerful mafia don Mark Antony. When Manikam and his close friend Anwar Baasha begin protesting against the atrocities committed by Antony's syndicate, Antony brutally executes Anwar. Manikam is spared only out of respect for Rangasamy. Enraged by his friend's murder, Manikam chooses the path of violence to dismantle Antony's empire. Rechristening himself as "Manik Baasha," he rises to become a benevolent but feared underworld don, earning the adoration of the public while systematically dismantling Antony's smuggling operations.

As tensions peak between the two gangs, Baasha declares to Antony that he will take him and his empire down once and for all within seven days. Over the course of those seven days, Baasha successfully takes over Antony's hold on the underworld, bringing police, politicians and other sons to his side. Desperate to eliminate his rival, Antony orchestrates an assassination attempt that Baasha survives. In retaliation, Antony murders Rangasamy. A grieving Baasha assists the police in capturing and imprisoning the don, while Antony's treacherous lieutenant, Kesavan, murders Antony's remaining family to inherit his wealth and remaining criminal empire. On his deathbed, Rangasamy begs his son to abandon the underworld and lead a peaceful life. Honoring his father's final wish, Baasha fakes his death and flees to Madras with his mother to live in obscurity.

In the present, Manikam learns that Kesavan is forcing Priya into an arranged marriage and storms the wedding hall. The moment Kesavan recognizes the auto driver as the legendary Baasha, he panics and instantly allows Priya to leave with him. Word of Baasha's survival spreads, reaching Antony, who escapes from prison. Antony murders the treacherous Kesavan and kidnaps Manikam's mother and siblings, demanding Baasha's surrender in exchange for their lives. Manikam rushes to the hideout, single-handedly overpowering Antony's mercenary army and rescuing his family. As Manikam corners Antony and prepares to kill him, Dinakar arrives to intervene. Seizing a final opportunity, Antony snatches Dinakar's service weapon to shoot Manikam, but Shiva fires first, killing Antony. Upon realizing the truth of Manikam's past, he apologizes to him for doubting him and the brothers reconcile. With the ghosts of his past finally laid to rest, Manikam safely reunites with Priya.

== Cast ==
- Rajinikanth as Manikam / Manik Baasha
- Nagma as Priya (Voice dubbed by Saritha)
- Raghuvaran as Mark Antony
- Janagaraj as Gurumurthy
- Devan as Kesavan
- Shashi Kumar as Shiva (Voice dubbed by Ravishankar Devanarayanan)
- Vijayakumar as Rangasamy
- Anandaraj as Indiran
- Charan Raj as Anwar Baasha
- Kitty as DIG A. Dinakar
- Sethu Vinayagam as the college chairman
- Sathyapriya as Vijayalakshmi
- Shenbaga as Kavitha (Voice dubbed by Nithya Ravindar)
- Yuvarani as Geetha (Voice dubbed by Jayageetha)
- Alphonsa (special appearance in the song "Ra Ra Ramaiah")
- Hemalatha as Mark Antony's daughter
- Thalapathy Dinesh as Manik Baashha's henchman
- Mahanadi Shankar as Manik Baashha's henchman
- Krishnan as Krishnan
- Dhamu as Dhamu
- Narsing Yadav as Mark Anthony's henchman

== Production ==
=== Development ===
During the making of the Hindi film Hum (1991), its director Mukul S. Anand had considered and discussed with Rajinikanth a potential scene, where Shekhar (Amitabh Bachchan) would help his younger brother Vijay (Govinda) get a seat in the Police Academy. Anand discarded the scene because he did not find it suitable, but Rajinikanth felt it had the potential to develop into a script for a feature film. On the sets of Annaamalai (1992), Rajinikanth and its director Suresh Krissna discussed the scene, which Krissna also found to be interesting. The title Baashha was suggested by Rajinikanth to Krissna, who suggested to Rajinikanth that a Muslim connection to the script was needed.

Krissna brought up the subject again to Rajinikanth during the making of Veera (1994), but Rajinikanth wanted to discuss the script only after completing Veera. The discarded scene from Hum became the foundation for Baashha where Rajinikanth's character in the film, Manikkam, helps his sister Geetha (Yuvarani) get admission to the medical college she had applied for. Krissna planned to weave the rest of the film's story around the scene. Though Manikkam was initially considered to be written as a bus conductor, the "auto driver was the commonest man around. And Rajini liked the idea".

R. M. Veerappan, who had earlier collaborated with Rajinikanth in Ranuva Veeran (1981), Moondru Mugam (1982), Thanga Magan (1983), Oorkavalan (1987) and Panakkaran (1990), was the film's co-producer, along with V. Rajammal and V. Thamilazhagan. Development regarding the film's script commenced in the Taj Banjara hotel in Hyderabad. Eighty percent of the script, including the flashback portions of Rajinikanth as Baashha, was ready in ten days. Balakumaran was selected to write the film's dialogues. The entire team of technicians who had worked with Krissna in Annaamalai, including music composer Deva, returned to work with him for Baashha.

=== Casting and filming ===
Nagma was the first and only choice for the role of the heroine Priya after Krissna was impressed with her performance in Kaadhalan (1994). Krissna considered some Bollywood names for the role of the antagonist Mark Antony, but nothing worked out. He then thought Raghuvaran would be a good fit, considering his tall height and deep voice. Rajinikanth also readily agreed to this proposal. Krissna met Raghuvaran at his residence and explained the role. Raghuvaran was excited and agreed to play Antony. According to Charan Raj, who played Anwar Baashha, Mammootty was the original choice for that role, but Rajinikanth objected to Mammootty's casting since they both already appeared together in Thalapathi (1991). Anandaraj was approached for an undisclosed role, later revealed to be Indiran; Rajinikanth told him the role required him to beat Manikkam who is tied to a pole, and Anandaraj agreed. According to Anandaraj, he was approached 10 days before filming ended.

Principal photography began in August 1994, and was completed in less than five months. The muhurat shot took place at AVM Studios at the venue which later came to be known as the Rajni Pillaiyar Temple. Fans of Rajinikanth were invited for the shot. Choreography for the song "Naan Autokaaran" was done by Tarun Kumar, whose father Hiralal was also a dance choreographer. Rajinikanth recommended Tarun to Krissna, who had initially wanted Raghuram to choreograph the song. Tarun completed the choreography in five days and the entire sequence was rehearsed at AVM Studios with fifty backup dancers. As in the song "Vandhenda Paalakaaran" from Annaamalai, the sequence was shot with Rajinikanth looking into the lens with a smile, which was intended to make the audience feel that he was looking directly at them and then putting his hands together to greet them. The gesture, which was already effective in Annaamalai, prompted Krissna to extend the screen time of the shot. Krissna wanted Rajinikanth to sport a dress that would make him look slightly unkempt, but Rajinikanth finished the sequence in a smartly tailored uniform and told Krissna that the audience would not find it odd. The filming of the song took place at the open space at Vijaya Vauhini Studios in Madras, the same area where Hotel Green Park is present; the song was completed with a hundred back-up dancers used for it in four days. Choreographers Kalyan and Ashok Raj were part of the backup dancers for the song.

In one of the action sequences involving the protagonist in a face-off against the antagonist's henchmen, the dialogue Naan oru thadava sonna, nooru thadava sonna madhiri (Saying it once is equal to my saying it a hundred times) is spoken. The first half of the film was shot for twenty-three days at a stretch. Regarding the dialogue's development, Rajinikanth told Balakumaran that the dialogue had to be simple yet effective, as it would be used in a sequence where another side of the protagonist was revealed. On the day when the sequence which featured the dialogue was to be shot, Rajinikanth came up with the dialogue, which was originally spoken by him as Naan oru vaatti sonna, nooru vaatti sonna madhiri, which impressed Balakumaran and Krissna. Before the take, Rajinikanth, who repeatedly rehearsed the dialogue, told Krissna that the word "thadava" sounded more effective than "vaatti", and suggested Krissna use "thadava" instead of "vaatti". (Note: "vaatti" is a synonym of "thadava".) Balakumaran initially disagreed with Rajinikanth and Krissna as he felt that "vaatti" was fine and did not need changing. Rajinikanth then spoke both the versions of the dialogue and convinced Balakumaran to change "vaatti" to "thadava". The dialogue had such an impact on everyone present at the set that, in the break that followed, everyone started using it one way or another. The dialogues occur only five times in the film. The scene where Manikkam gets beaten up to protect his sibling and the following sequence where he beats up the antagonist in turn, was suggested to Krissna by Raju, the choreographer for both the stunt sequences.

Ramalingam, the son of R. M. Veerappan, informed Krissna that Veerappan wanted to meet him. Krissna had finished shooting the sequence where Manikkam gets beaten up by Indiran after trying to protect his younger brother Shiva (Shashi Kumar). When Veerappan enquired Krissna about how the film was shaping up, Krissna spoke about the scene which he had shot before his meeting with Veerappan. Veerappan wanted the scene to be deleted as he felt that people would not want to see Rajinikanth getting beaten up. Rajinikanth offered to show a sneak preview of the film to Veerappan on 15 December 1994, and if Veerappan did not want the scene to be in the film, the scene would be re-shot, and Rajinikanth offered to bear the costs for re-shooting the scene himself. The shooting was stalled for five days after Krissna's meeting with Veerappan. Later, Krissna, Raju, the choreographer for the stunt sequence, and cameraman Prakash concluded that the scene would be tweaked in such a way that it would be as if Mother Nature is angry at the treatment being meted out to a peace-loving person like Manikkam; it was also planned that backlighting and a poignant background music would be used as well. Twenty-five scenes, including those which show Manikkam's house and neighbourhood were shot at Vijaya Vauhini Studios. The set at the studio was designed by Magie, the film's art director. The set also consisted of a tea stall, a cycle stand, and a theatre. The scenes featuring the comedy sequences, interludes featuring Nagma, and some of the action sequences featuring Anandaraj were also filmed at Vijaya Vauhini Studios. Krissna wanted to complete the scenes scheduled to be filmed there before dismantling the sets. According to Magie, the set cost around ₹35 lakh (equivalent to ₹2.5 crore or US$270,000 in 2026).

== Music ==
The film’s soundtrack and background music were composed by Deva with lyrics by Vairamuthu. Due to the popularity of rap music at the time, Deva wanted the introduction song to reflect the style of the Boney M. group and composed a tune accordingly, but it did not suit Rajinikanth's cinematic style. Deva then rendered a tune with dummy lyrics based on the gaana genre during the composing session and sang a few lines to Krissna, Rajinikanth, and others: "Kappal meledora paaru, Dora kezhey aaya paaru, Aaya kayila kozhandahai paaru" (transl. See the ship sailing, See the Englishman on it, also see the poor native woman on board, with a baby in her arms. All, especially Rajinikanth, were impressed by the tune and style, which laid the foundation for the song "Naan Autokaaran, Autokaaran." Vairamuthu wrote the lyrics for the song in just ten minutes and the recording for the song was done by Deva.

For the next song, "Ra Ra Ramaiya" Vairamuthu compiled the lyrics in eight minutes. The third song "Style Style Thaan" is partly based on the James Bond Theme. The song "Azhagu" is based on the Hindi song "Dilbar Dil Se Pyaare", composed by R. D. Burman for Caravan (1971). The theme music of Baashha is based on the theme of Terminator 2: Judgment Day (1991), while a sample of Enigma's "Carly's Song" was used as the theme of Mark Anthony. The music rights were acquired by AVM Audio for ₹25 lakh (equivalent to ₹1.6 crore or US$170,000 in 2026), at a time when most soundtracks by Deva were sold for ₹6 lakh (equivalent to ₹39 lakh or US$42,000 in 2026) or ₹8 lakh (equivalent to ₹52 lakh or US$56,000 in 2026). The soundtrack was a large success, and all the numbers were chartbusters. A special function was held at Hotel Chola Sheraton to celebrate the success of the film's soundtrack. Rajinikanth was presented a platinum disc on the occasion.

All lyrics are written by Vairamuthu.

Tamil version
No.	Title	Singer(s)	Length
1.	"Thanga Magan"	K. J. Yesudas, K. S. Chithra	5:12
2.	"Naan Autokaaran"	S. P. Balasubrahmanyam	5:37
3.	"Style Style Thaan"	S. P. Balasubrahmanyam, K. S. Chithra	5:27
4.	"Azhagu Azhagu"	S. P. Balasubrahmanyam, K. S. Chithra	5:12
5.	"Ra.. Ra.. Ramaiya"	S. P. Balasubrahmanyam, Swarnalatha	6:33
6.	"Baatcha Paaru"	S. P. Balasubrahmanyam	1:18
7.	"Namma Thozhan"	S. P. Balasubrahmanyam	1:55
Total length:			31:17

Telugu version
No.	Title	Singer(s)	Length
1.	"Kalala Maharaju"	S. P. Balasubrahmanyam, K. S. Chithra
2.	"Nee Nadakala"	S. P. Balasubrahmanyam, K. S. Chithra
3.	"Nenu Auto Vanni"	S. P. Balasubrahmanyam
4.	"Ra.. Ra.. Ramayya"	S. P. Balasubrahmanyam, K. S. Chithra
5.	"Style Style Raa"	S. P. Balasubrahmanyam, K. S. Chithra
6.	"Basha Choodu"	S. P. Balasubrahmanyam

All lyrics are written by Gopal Ram and Indeevar.

Hindi version
No.	Title	Singer(s)	Length
1.	"Auto Wala"	S. P. Balasubrahmanyam	5:22
2.	"Chahra Hai Tera Sundar"	Kumar Sanu, Poornima	5:39
3.	"Super Style"	Kumar Sanu, Poornima	5:07
4.	"Ek Hi Chand Hain"	Udit Narayan	6:33
5.	"Chahre Pe Dhup"	K. J. Yesudas, K. S. Chithra	4:44
6.	"Baashha Dekh"	S. P. Balasubrahmanyam	1:00
7.	"Baashha Dekh" (Sad)	S. P. Balasubrahmanyam	1:07
Total length:			29:35

== Release ==
Baashha was released theatrically on 12 January 1995, two days before Pongal. It was released with 18 prints in North Arcot, South Arcot and Chengalpet areas. The film was a major success, and took nearly 15 months to complete its entire theatrical run. For his performance, Rajinikanth won the Filmfans Association Award and the Cinema Express Award for Best Actor.

== Reception ==
On 13 January 1995, a review from The Hindu said, "Rajini blossoms fully to portray two different characters, a former dada of Bombay and a docile peace-loving auto driver in Tamil Nadu, trying not to fall back on his old ways and finding it difficult to do so when force of circumstances pressure him" and that Suresh Krishna "has fashioned his screenplay to suit the image of Rajini and the taste of his fans and the songs and sequences are fashioned to boost the image of the hero". On 23 January, K. Vijiyan of the New Straits Times said "If you are not a Rajini fan, go without expecting too much and you may not be disappointed". On 29 January, Ananda Vikatan said the director had intelligently created scenes to present Rajinikanth with full honour, also noting that Rajinikanth had taken the majestic form in the film through his acting and action sequences, and that made the film a treat to watch. R. P. R. of Kalki wrote that fans had come to a stage where they enjoy whatever Rajinikanth does, and encouraged the director to try something different next time.

== Legacy ==
Baashha attained cult status in Tamil cinema, and was remade in Kannada as Kotigobba (2001) and in Bengali as Guru (2003). The film was also remade twice in Bangladesh—as Sultan in 2001 and as Manik Badsha in 2003. In May 2007, K. Balamurugan of Rediff.com ranked the film tenth in his list of "Rajni's Tamil Top 10" films. In October 2008, Outlook included Rajinikanth's dialogue "Naan oru thadavai sonna nooru thadavai sonna madhiri [sic]" in its list, "13 Cheesiest, Chalkiest Lines in Indian Cinema". The line was also used in "The Punch Song", a song from the film, Aaha Kalyanam (2014). When stand-up comedian and television anchor Bosskey launched a play titled Dada (Don) in October 2005, he named the cast after famous characters in Tamil films. Accordingly, Anniyan (one of Vikram's characters in the film), Baasha (Rajinikanth's character in the film) and Velu Nayakkar (Kamal Haasan's role in Nayakan) play the central characters of a family of brothers. Maanik Baashha was imitated by Indrans in the Malayalam film Three Men Army (1995), by Dhamu in Aasai (1995), by Rangayana Raghu in the Kannada film Rama Rama Raghurama (2011) and by Rajendran in Bruce Lee (2017), which was initially titled Baasha Engira Antony.

A dialogue from the film, "Enakku Innoru Per Irukku" (I have another name) was used as the title of a 2016 film, while other films titled Antony (2018), Maanik (2019) and Mark Antony (2023) inspired by the lead characters were also released. In 2002, the Telugu film Khadgam was dubbed and released in Tamil as Thiru Manick Baasha. In 2008, the Malayalam film Big B was dubbed and released in Tamil as Maanik Baasha. The rivalry between Manik Baasha and Mark Antony became iconic, and was referenced in the song "Engadi Porandha" from Vanakkam Chennai (2013). After the release of Padayappa (1999), Rajinikanth and Suresh Krissna discussed the possibility of making a sequel to Baashha. Ultimately, they felt that Baashha was inimitable—not even a sequel could equal it.

== Re-releases ==
The Hindi-dubbed version of Baashha was released on 25 May 2012, after being digitally restored. A digitally restored version of the Tamil original was released on 3 March 2017. It features numerous Ola Cabs stickers digitally inserted on to auto rickshaws due to a partnership between the producers and Ola Cabs. These changes were received with ridicule by some netizens due to being perceived as anachronistic, while others viewed it as a "smart marketing move". A month later, Ola announced the "Ola Baasha Mela", described as India's first and "largest Auto Driver Partners' Mela", which took place from 8 to 10 April in Chennai. A remastered version was released on 18 July 2025.

== Bibliography ==
- Dhananjayan, G. (2011). The Best of Tamil Cinema, 1931 to 2010: 1977–2010. Galatta Media. OCLC 733724281.
- Krissna, Suresh; Rangarajan, Malathi (2012). My Days with Baasha: The Rajnikanth Phenomenon. Westland. ISBN 978-93-8162-629-0.
- Ramachandran, Naman (2014) [2012]. Rajinikanth: The Definitive Biography. New Delhi: Penguin Books. ISBN 978-81-8475-796-5.
