= Cheran Pandian =

- Theatrical release poster
- Directed by: K. S. Ravikumar
- Screenplay by: K. S. Ravikumar
- Story by: Erode Soundar
- Produced by: R. B. Choudary
- Starring: Vijayakumar; Sarathkumar; Sreeja
- Cinematography: Ashok Rajan
- Edited by: K. Thanikachalam
- Music by: Soundaryan
- Production company: Super Good Films
- Release date: 31 May 1991
- Running time: 144 minutes
- Country: India
- Language: Tamil

Cheran Pandian is a 1991 Indian Tamil-language action drama film written and directed by K. S. Ravikumar, from a story by Erode Soundar. The film stars Vijayakumar, Sarathkumar, Anand Babu and Sreeja. It was released on 31 May 1991, emerged a box office success and won several Tamil Nadu State Film Awards. The film was remade in Telugu as Balarama Krishnulu (1992), and in Hindi in as Sautela (1999).

== Plot ==
Manicheran Gounder or Periya Gounder is the rich head of the Muthupalayam village in Coimbatore District. He lives with his wife Paarvathi and daughter Vennila, and strictly adheres to the caste system. Rajapaandi Gounder or Chinna Gounder is Periya Gounder's half brother and also a rich landlord in the same village, and Parimalam is his sister. Since Rajapaandi's mother was from a suppressed caste, Periya Gounder stays aloof from him and always ignores and berates Rajapaandi and Parimalam. Manicheran had split his share of ancestral properties and went separate at age 18, when his father Bunglow Gounder married Rajapaandi's mother. Still Bunglow Gounder, before dying, had divided his entire self-earned property, including the house, equally between the two brothers, and they live on either side of the bungalow house, split by a wall in the middle. Yet, Periya Gounder's family gets first respect in the village and at the local temple, and he refuses to yield any privilege to Rajapaandi.

Chandran, a first cousin of Rajapaandi through his maternal uncle, comes to meet and work under him in the village since his parents are dead, and he could not find a job in Tirupur. He falls in love with Vennila. Periya Gounder is furious when he learns of this and tries to get Vennila married to his brother-in-law, and after being rebuked by him, he makes arrangements for Vennila's marriage with a womanising thug, son of a devious village elder, since he belongs to his own, supposedly higher caste. After a serious turn of events, Periya Gounder has a change of heart with some heartfelt advice from Paarvathi, Parimalam's while trying to save Vennila, renounces his caste-centric mindset and accepts Rajapaandi as his equal sibling. During the scuffle, the injured Parimalam saved her brother Periya Gounder and died by the shot. Chandran and Vennila end up getting married.

== Cast ==
- Vijayakumar as Mani Cheran Gounder (Periya Gounder)
- Sarathkumar as Raja Pandian Gounder (Chinna Gounder)
- Sreeja as Vennila
- Nagesh as Maniyam
- Anand Babu as Chandran
- Manjula Vijayakumar as Parvathi
- Goundamani as Mechanic Manikkam (motor mechanic)
- Senthil as Thangam
- Anuja as Sundari, Manikkam's wife
- Chithra as Parimalam
- K. S. Ravikumar as Sundaram
- Kumarimuthu as Mariappan

Assistant director Krishna Mohan and Jiiva make uncredited appearances in the song "Chinna Thangam" with the former playing Parimalam's husband.

== Production ==
Cheran Pandian is K. S. Ravikumar's second film as director. Producer R. B. Choudary had previously stated he would finance Ravikumar's second directorial film, regardless of how well his first (Puriyaadha Pudhir) performed at the box office. Cheran worked as an assistant director.

== Soundtrack ==
The music was composed by Soundaryan, who also wrote the lyrics. Ravikumar rewrote the screenplay according to some of the songs after hearing them. The song "Kadhal Kaditham" is set in Mohanam raga.

Title	Singer(s)	Length
"Kangal Ondraga"	Mano, K. S. Chithra	04:49
"Kadhal Kaditham"	Labson Rajkumar, Swarnalatha	04:34
"Samba Naathu"	Swarnalatha	04:41
"Va Va Endhan"	S. P. Balasubrahmanyam	04:43
"Kodiyum Thoranamum"	Malaysia Vasudevan, Sunandha	05:05
"Chinna Thangam"	K. J. Yesudas	4:33
"Ethirveetu Jannal"	Malaysia Vasudevan, Krishnaraj	5:22
"Ooru Vittu Ooru"	S. P. Sailaja	5:24

== Release and reception ==
Cheran Pandian was released on 31 May 1991. C. R. K. of Kalki appreciated the songs but criticised their abundance. He also criticised Ravikumar's direction and writing. Cheran Pandian won the Tamil Nadu State Film Awards for Special Prize for Best Film, Best Story Writer (Erode Soundar) and Best Sound Recording (Sampath). Vijayakumar won the Cinema Express Award for Best Character Actor.
