= Muthal Seethanam =

- Theatrical release poster
- Directed by: Erode Soundar
- Written by: Erode Sounder
- Produced by: R. B. Choudary
- Starring: Shiva; Aamani
- Cinematography: K. Ram Singh
- Edited by: K. Thanigachalam
- Music by: Soundaryan
- Production company: Super Good Films
- Release date: 14 August 1992
- Country: India
- Language: Tamil

Muthal Seethanam (transl. The first dowry) is a 1992 Indian Tamil-language romantic drama film written and directed by Erode Soundar in his directorial debut and produced by R. B. Choudary. The film stars Shiva and Aamani. It was released on 14 August 1992.

== Plot ==
The movie stars Shiva as a washerman's brother and Aamani as a landlord's daughter. Their love story begins when she helps change his attitude toward his work and life, but their romance runs into trouble because of the social gap between their families - he comes from a washerman family while she is from a wealthy landlord family. Circumstances eventually force them apart. Set in a rural village, the film also weaves in comedy through Goundamani and Senthil, with Erode Soundar himself appearing as the barber.

== Cast ==
- Shiva as the washerman's brother
- Aamani as the landlord's daughter
- Goundamani
- Rajesh
- Napoleon as Devi Meenakshi's uncle
- Kavitha as Devi Meenakshi's stepmother
- Erode Soundar as the barber
- Senthil
- Mohanapriya
- Prathiba
- Radha Ravi
- Omakuchi Narasimhan
- Kumarimuthu

== Production ==
Muthal Seethanam is the directorial debut of Erode Soundar who also wrote the script and portrayed a supporting role. It was produced by R. B. Choudary under Super Good Films. Cinematography was handled by K. Ram Singh, and editing by K. Thanigachalam.

== Soundtrack ==
The soundtrack was composed by Soundaryan.

No.	Title	Singer(s)	Length
1.	"Ettu Madippu Sela"	S. P. Balasubrahmanyam
2.	"Kelu Kelu"	Mano
3.	"Oh Nenchame"	S. P. Balasubrahmanyam, K. S. Chithra
4.	"Pattu Vanna"	S. P. Balasubrahmanyam, Minmini
5.	"Sutha Samba"	Malaysia Vasudevan, Swarnalatha

== Release and reception ==
Muthal Seethanam was released on 14 August 1992. A review in The Indian Express criticised Shiva's performance, saying he "has miles to go before he can put up a credible performance" and added that Rajesh "with bloodshot eyes does not look quite comfortable in his villainy".
