= Super Good Films =

Indian film company

Super Good Films (P) Ltd
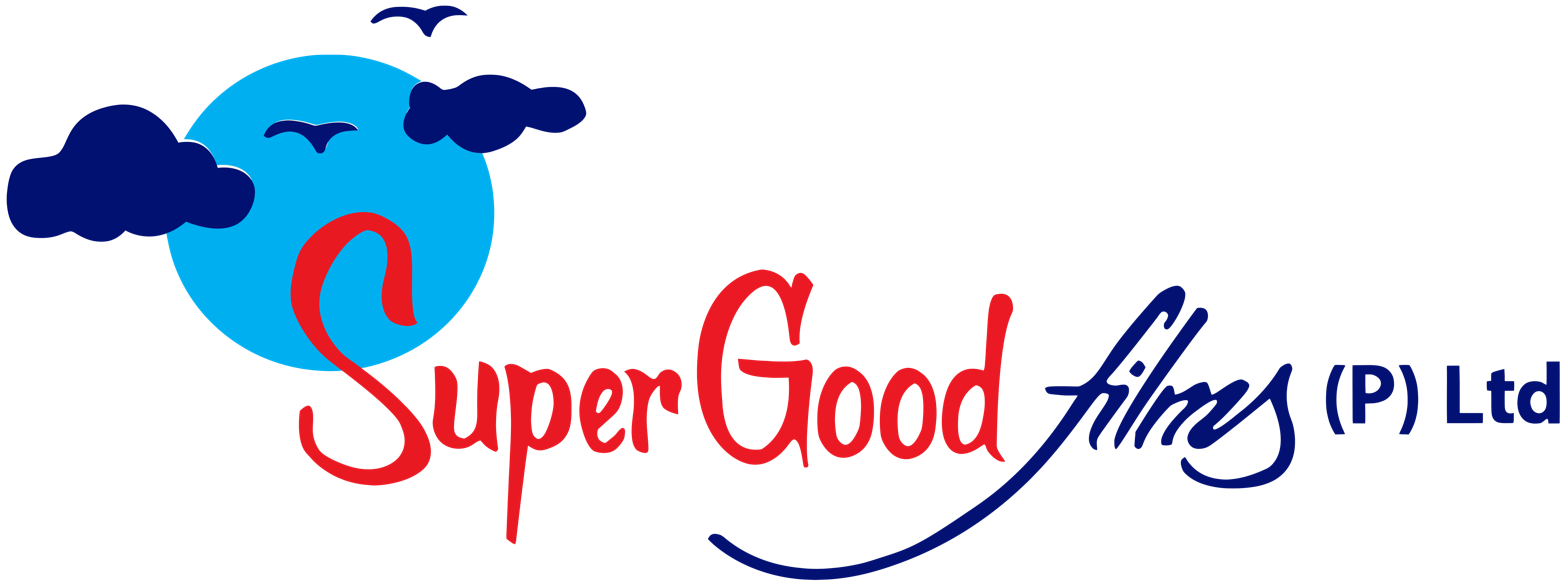
- Type: Film production and distribution
- Industry: Motion pictures and Television
- Founded: 1988
- Founder: R. B. Choudary

Super Good Films is an Indian film production and distribution company in Tamil cinema. It is also credited as Mega Super Good Films in Telugu cinema and Hindi cinema. It was established in the 1980s by R. B. Choudary.

== History ==
R. B. Choudary hails from a Rajasthani family. He was into steel, exports and jewels business before entering film production. He started his career as a producer with Malayalam film industry first and produced a few films under "Super" banner. In 1989, he entered Tamil film industry and produced films on 'Super' banner in partnership with R. Mohan, who manufactured "Good Knight" mosquito mats. When they decided to part ways, Choudary borrowed good from 'Good Knight' and modified it as 'Super Good' films.

Super Good Films was created by R. B. Choudary in the late 1980s and the producer continued to manage the film's activities for twenty years. Several successful directors in the Tamil film industry were given their first film by the studio, including K. S. Ravikumar (Puriyaadha Pudhir), Vikraman (Pudhu Vasantham), Sasi (Sollamale), Ezhil (Thullatha Manamum Thullum) and N. Lingusamy (Aanandham).

In the studio's 50th venture, Choudary's youngest son Jiiva was cast in the debut lead role for the film Aasai Aasaiyai (2003) by Ravi Mariya. The Mohanlal-Vijay starrer, Jilla (2014) marked the studio's 85th film.

In the 2010s, Choudary's son, actor Jithan Ramesh, took over co-managerial duties. The studio has often associated with actor Vijay, and Jiiva suggested that they planned to make their hundredth venture with the actor during an interview in January 2018.

== Filmography ==
Production

Year	Title	Language	Awards
1988	Adipapam	Malayalam	
1989	Layanam	Malayalam	
1989	Kalpana House	Malayalam	
1990	Pudhu Vasantham	Tamil	Tamil Nadu State Film Award for Best Film; Filmfare Award for Best Film – Tamil
1990	Puriyaadha Pudhir	Tamil	
1991	Cheran Pandiyan	Tamil	Tamil Nadu State Film Award Special Prize
1991	MGR Nagaril	Tamil	
1991	Chodhyam	Malayalam	Shelved
1991	Perum Pulli	Tamil	
1991	Putham Pudhu Payanam	Tamil	
1992	Oor Mariyadhai	Tamil	
1992	Muthal Seethanam	Tamil	
1992	Abhirami	Tamil	
1993	Gokulam	Tamil	Tamil Nadu State Film Award for Best Film (3rd Prize) Co-produced with J.K Combines
1994	Captain	Telugu	
1994	Chinna Madam	Tamil	
1994	Nattamai	Tamil	Tamil Nadu State Film Award for Best Film; Cinema Express Award for Best Film – Tamil
1996	Poove Unakkaga	Tamil	
1996	Sengottai	Tamil	
1996	Sundara Purushan	Tamil	
1996	Mr. Romeo	Tamil	
1997	Love Today	Tamil	
1997	Suryavamsam	Tamil	Tamil Nadu State Film Award for Best Film; Cinema Express Award for Best Film – Tamil
1998	Suswagatham	Telugu	Under Super Good Combines
1998	Suryavamsam	Telugu	
1998	Jolly	Tamil	
1998	Sandhippoma	Tamil	
1998	Sollamale	Tamil	
1998	Simmarasi	Tamil	
1998	Nenu Premisthunnanu	Telugu	
1998	Kannathal	Tamil	
1999	Thullatha Manamum Thullum	Tamil	Tamil Nadu State Film Award for Best Film (2nd Prize)
1999	Raja	Telugu	Filmfare Award for Best Film – Telugu
1999	Poomagal Oorvalam	Tamil	
1999	Neti Gandhi	Telugu	
1999	Nee Varuvai Ena	Tamil	
1999	Seenu	Telugu	
1999	Kannupada Poguthaiya	Tamil	
2000	Thirunelveli	Tamil	
2000	Nuvvu Vasthavani	Telugu	
2000	Unnai Kodu Ennai Tharuven	Tamil	
2000	Maayi	Tamil	
2000	Ninne Premistha	Telugu	
2000	O Nanna Nalle	Kannada	Under Super Good Combines
2001	Priyamaina Neeku	Telugu	partially made in Tamil as Kaadhal Sugamanadhu
2001	Vinnukum Mannukum	Tamil	
2001	Aanandham	Tamil	Filmfare Award for Best Film – Tamil; Tamil Nadu State Film Award for Best Film (3rd Prize); Cinema Express Award for Best Film – Tamil
2001	Simharasi	Telugu	
2001	Samudhiram	Tamil	
2001	Snehamante Idera	Telugu	
2001	Shahjahan	Tamil	
2002	Punnagai Desam	Tamil	
2002	Kamarasu	Tamil	
2002	Adrustam	Telugu	Under Super Good Productions
2002	Pyaar Diwana Hota Hai	Hindi	
2002	Varushamellam Vasantham	Tamil	
2002	Arputham	Tamil	
2002	Siva Rama Raju	Telugu	
2003	Aasai Aasaiyai	Tamil	
2003	Thithikudhe	Tamil	
2004	Love Today	Telugu	
2004	Vidyardhi	Telugu	
2005	Thirupaachi	Tamil	
2005	Sankranti	Telugu	
2005	Sye	Kannada	Under Super Good Combines
2006	Keerthi Chakra	Malayalam	
2006	Andala Ramudu	Telugu	Under Mega Super Good Films
2006	E	Tamil	
2006	Annavaram	Telugu	Under Mega Super Good Films
2007	Nava Vasantham	Telugu	Under Mega Super Good Films
2008	Indra	Kannada	Under Super Good Combines
2008	Gorintaku	Telugu	Under Mega Super Good Films
2010	Punda	Kannada	Under Super Good Combines
2010	Kacheri Arambam	Tamil	
2010	Bheemili Kabaddi Jattu	Telugu	Under Mega Super Good Films
2011	Pillaiyar Theru Kadaisi Veedu	Tamil	
2011	Rowthiram	Tamil	
2011	Manchivadu	Telugu	Under Mega Super Good Films
2012	Rachcha	Telugu	Under Mega Super Good Films
2013	Mr. Pellikoduku	Telugu	Under Mega Super Good Films
2014	Jilla	Tamil	
2014	Villali Veeran	Malayalam	
2017	Motta Shiva Ketta Shiva	Tamil	
2017	Kadamban	Tamil	
2021	Kalathil Santhipom	Tamil	
2021	Ishq: Not A Love Story	Telugu	Under Mega Super Good Films Remake of Malayalam film Ishq: Not A Love Story
2022	Godfather	Telugu	Co-produced with Konidela Production Company Remake of Malayalam film Lucifer
2022	Varalaru Mukkiyam	Tamil	
2022	Cheppalani Undi	Telugu	
2024	Thankamani	Malayalam	Co-produced with Iffaar Media
2024	Bhavanam	Telugu	
2024	Kummaattikali	Malayalam	
2025	Maareesan	Tamil	
2026	Magudam	Tamil	Co-produced with Vishal Film Factory

Distribution

Year	Film	Language	Notes
1983	Adutha Varisu	Tamil	Overseas only
1995	Amman	Tamil	Dubbed version of Telugu film Ammoru
1997	Akka	Tamil	Dubbed version of Kannada film Karpoorada Gombe
1999	Vaalee	Telugu	Dubbed version of Tamil film Vaalee
2001	Pappa	Tamil	Dubbed version of Telugu film Devi Putrudu
2005	Jithan	Tamil	
2012	Mask	Telugu	Dubbed version of Mugamoodi, under Mega Super Good films
2017	Dwaraka	Telugu	
2017	Veera Ranachandi	Kannada	under Super Good Combines
2019	Sye Raa Narasimha Reddy	Tamil	Dubbed version of Telugu film Sye Raa Narasimha Reddy
2023	DD Returns	Telugu	Dubbed version of Tamil film DD Returns
