= Cinema Express Award for Best Film – Tamil =

Indian film award

The Cinema Express Best Film Award is given as a part of its annual Cinema Express Awards for Tamil (Kollywood) films.

== Winners ==
Year	Film	Producer
2002	Kannathil Muthamittal	Mani Ratnam
2001	Aanandham	R. B. Choudary
2000	Kandukondain Kandukondain	Kalaipuli S. Thanu and A. M. Rathnam
1999	Sethu	A. Kandasamy
1998	Unnidathil Ennai Koduthen	K. Muralidharan; V.Swaminathan G.Venugopal
1997	Surya Vamsam; Porkkaalam	R. B. Choudary; V. Gnanavelu
1996	Indian; Kadhal Kottai	A. M. Rathnam; Sivasakthi Pandian
1995	Bombay; Kuruthipunal	Mani Ratnam; Kamal Haasan
1994	Nattamai	R. B. Choudary
1993	Kizhakku Cheemayile	Kalaipuli S. Thanu
1992	Thevar Magan	Kamal Haasan
1991	Chinna Thambi	K. Balu
1990	Anjali	Mani Ratnam, G. Venkateswaran
1989	Apoorva Sagodharargal	Kamal Haasan
1988	Agni Natchathiram	Mani Ratnam, G. Venkateswaran
1987	Nayakan	G. Venkateswaran
1986	Samsaram Adhu Minsaram	AVM Productions
1985	Muthal Mariyathai	Bharathiraja
1984	Sirai	V. Mohan Chandran
1983	Mundhanai Mudichu	AVM Productions
1982	Moondram Pirai	G. Thyagarajan
1981	Thanneer Thanneer	P. R. Govindarajan Duraisamy
1980	Oru Thalai Ragam	E. M. Ibrahim
