= Aanandham =

2001 film by N. Linguswamy

- Poster
- Directed by: N. Lingusamy
- Written by: Brinda Sarathy (Dialogues)
- Screenplay by: N. Lingusamy
- Story by: N. Lingusamy
- Produced by: R. B. Choudary
- Starring: Mammootty; Murali; Abbas; Devayani; Rambha; Sneha; Shyam Ganesh
- Cinematography: Arthur A. Wilson
- Edited by: V. Jaishanker
- Music by: S. A. Rajkumar
- Production company: Super Good Films
- Release date: 25 May 2001
- Running time: 162 minutes
- Country: India
- Language: Tamil

Aanandham (transl. Joy) is a 2001 Indian Tamil-language drama film co-written and directed by N. Lingusamy in his directoral debut and produced by R. B. Choudary. The film features an ensemble cast including Mammootty, Murali, Abbas, Devayani, Rambha, Sneha, Delhi Ganesh and Srividya. Arthur A. Wilson handled cinematography, while S. A. Rajkumar composed the film's score and soundtrack. The film was released on 25 May 2001 to positive reviews, and became one of the highest grossing Tamil films of the year. It was remade in Telugu as Sankranti (2005).

== Plot ==
Thirupathisamy owns a provisional store and is the eldest among four brothers, and all live together in a home along with their parents. Thirupathi is widely respected by everyone in the family and was responsible for bringing back their family to a good state after financial troubles a few years back. He marries Bharathi, who is responsible and kind. Madhavan is the second son in the family who assists Thirupathi in managing their provisional store. He is innocent and marries his relative Renuka, but she is short-tempered and picks up quarrels often. Kannan is the third son in the family, and he goes to college where he falls for his classmate Viji. Viji is the only daughter of a rich arrogant man Thavasi. Surya is the youngest son and studies in college. Renuka feels that only Thirupathi is respected by everyone and not Madhavan because Tirupati manages the provisional store while Madhavan just assists him. She keeps insisting Madhavan to start a separate provisional store, which he does not accept as that would separate him from his brothers. Thavasi learns of Viji's love towards Kannan and warns him to forget her. Kannan gets a job and leaves to Delhi as he does not want to marry Viji against her father's wishes.

One day, Renuka begins a quarrel at home saying that Thirupathi has a separate savings account in the bank and takes money from the account without the knowledge of other family members. Thirupathi feels bad hearing this. Suddenly, Renuka and Madhavan's daughter faints and is rushed to hospital. It is revealed that the child was suffering from a serious disease which only Thirupati knew before, and he was saving money to meet out the medical expenses without informing others, as they will worry if they get to know about the child's disease. Renuka realises her mistake knowing this and apologises to Thirupathi for her harsh behaviour towards him and Bharathi.

Later, they start a rice mill. Thirupathi learns of Kannan's love towards Viji and goes to meet Thavasi with a marriage proposal. Thavasi agrees for the wedding, but on a condition that Kannan should stay along with Viji in his home as he does not want to send his daughter to another home after wedding. Thirupathi agrees to the condition but does not inform this to Kannan as he will not agree. On the day of the engagement, everyone insults Bharathi for not having a child for many years. The family all leave during the ceremony. Renuka and Madhavan's daughter tells Kannan of the condition; he cancels the wedding, and comes back to his home to meet his family members. Following him, Viji also comes, asking him to marry her against her father's wishes.

Thirupathi convinces the couple that if they get married without Thavasi's permission, then it will be a big blow to Thavasi's status in society and they should not be the reason behind that. He also convinces Viji to return to her home immediately before anyone could know about this. When they step out of the home, they see Thavasi with a mob of men, whom were prepared to attack Thirupathi's family. Since Tavasi overheard Thirupathi's conversation with Viji, realises his good nature, and agrees for their wedding. Finally, Kannan and Viji get married happily, and Viji lives along with everyone in a joint family in Thirupathi's home.

== Cast ==
- Mammootty as Thirupathisamy, eldest son of the family
- Murali as Madhavan, second son
- Abbas as Kannan, third son
- Shyam Ganesh as Surya, youngest son
- Devayani as Bharathi, Thirupathi's wife
- Rambha as Renuka, Madhavan's wife
- Sneha as Viji, Kannan's love interest turned wife
- Delhi Ganesh as Gangadharan, four brother's father
- Srividya as Ranganayagi, four brother's mother
- Vijayakumar as Thavasi, Viji's father
- Sashikumar Subramani as Srinivasan, Susheela & Renuka's younger brother
- Shathiga as Madhavan & Renuka's daughter
- Poonam Singar as Susheela, Renuka's elder sister
- Periyar Dasan as Accountant
- Sethu Vinayagam as Ramanathan, Susheela & Renuka's father
- Vijaya Singh as Mangalam, Susheela & Renuka's mother
- Bava Lakshmanan as Mani, Thirupathi's Stores assistant
- Ilavarasu
- Besant Ravi
- Dhinanthorum Nagaraj as postman

== Production ==
The director Linguswamy revealed that the film was inspired by moments in his life and through a series of incidents his mother had narrated to him. Thus when director Rajakumaran convinced R. B. Choudary to give Linguswamy an opportunity, he narrated the stories and he found the producer had found them highly appealing. The director had previously assisted Vikraman in Vaanathaippola, another family drama on brothers. Linguswamy originally wanted to title the project, Thirupathi Brothers, which he later went on to name his production house.

Ramya Krishnan was initially signed on to play heroine but Mammooty cast his doubts over her involvement after the pair had fallen out on the sets of a previous Malayalam film, and she was subsequently replaced by Soundarya. Devayani was supposed to feature as Murali's pair in the film, but the actor was reluctant as Devayani had appeared as his sister in another film in the same period, Kannukku Kannaga (2000). After Soundarya opted out, Devayani was given the role of Mammooty's pair. Tarun was initially supposed to play the fourth brother in the film and make his acting debut in Tamil cinema, but the role was later altered and Shyam Ganesh was cast.

The filming was primarily held at Kumbakonam. While scouting for a courtyard home, team found a home in Sterling College at Swamimalai. The scenes of weddings of Mammootty and Murali were shot at Thirubuvanam temple while the introduction scene of Sneha was shot at Mahamaham tank. Shooting was held at locations in Chennai, Ooty and Mettupalayam among other places. The team faced criticism after litter, including chicken bones, were left on the ground following a shoot sequence held at the Kamakshi temple, Kancheepuram. Subsequently, the government intervened and prevented any further shoots to take place at temples.

== Soundtrack ==
The soundtrack was composed by S. A. Rajkumar. The song "Pallankuzhiyin" marked the debut of Yugabharathi as lyricist after Linguswamy was impressed with his compilation of poems.

Track listing
No.	Title	Lyrics	Singer(s)	Length
1.	"Aasai Aasaiyai"	Kalaikumar	K. J. Yesudas	5:43
2.	"Adi Koochatha"	Kalaikumar	Sukhwinder Singh, Swarnalatha	3:54
3.	"Gokulathu Radhai"	Pa. Vijay	Unni Menon, Sujatha, S. P. Charan, Yugendran	5:15
4.	"Enna Idhuvo"	Viveka	Hariharan	4:34
5.	"Kalyana Vaanil"	Tholkapiyan	Unni Menon, Sujatha	4:17
6.	"Pallangkuzhiyin"	Yugabharathi	P. Unnikrishnan, Harini	5:04
Total length:				28:47

== Release and reception ==
Aanandham opened to positive reviews. Malini Mannath of Chennai Online called it "a promising work from the debutant director", but pointed out its similarities to Vaanathaippola. Ananda Vikatan rated the film 44 out of 100. Abbas' performance in the film was praised by critics. Gowri Ramnarayan, writing for The Hindu, listed the film amongst the best of 2001.

== Accolades ==
Aanandham was nominated for the Filmfare Awards for Best Director – Tamil (Lingusamy), Best Actress – Tamil (Devayani) and Best Music Director – Tamil (Rajkumar). It won the Filmfare Award for Best Film – Tamil, and the Cinema Express Award for Best Film – Tamil. Aanandham also won in two categories the Tamil Nadu State Film Awards: Third Best Film and Best Actress for Sneha, who was also recognised for this film alongside her work in Virumbugiren and Punnagai Desam.

== Box office ==
The film was both a commercial and critical success. It was one of the biggest hits of Mammootty in Tamil cinema and also one of the highest grossing Tamil films of the year.

== Other versions ==
A Telugu remake was released in 2005 as Sankranti. A TV series inspired by Aanandham, titled Pandian Stores, premiered in 2018.
