= Samudhiram =

2001 film by K. S. Ravikumar

- Poster
- Directed by: K. S. Ravikumar
- Screenplay by: K. S. Ravikumar
- Story by: Erode Soundar
- Produced by: R. B. Choudary
- Starring: Sarathkumar; Murali; Manoj Bharathiraja; Kaveri; Abhirami; Sindhu Menon; Monal
- Cinematography: S. Murthy
- Edited by: K. Thanikachalam
- Music by: Sabesh–Murali
- Production company: Super Good Films
- Release date: 31 August 2001
- Running time: 163 minutes
- Country: India
- Language: Tamil

Samudhiram (transl. Ocean) is a 2001 Indian Tamil-language drama film co-written by Erode Soundar and directed by K. S. Ravikumar. The film stars an ensemble cast of Sarathkumar, Murali, Manoj Bharathiraja, Kaveri, Abhirami, Sindhu Menon and Monal. The score and soundtrack are composed by Sabesh–Murali.

Samudhiram was released on 31 August 2001 and became a commercial success. The film was remade in Telugu as Siva Rama Raju, in Bengali as Kartabya and in Kannada as Paramashiva.

== Plot ==
Selvarasu is the head of his family, and his two brothers Thangarasu and Chinnarasu are ready to give up their lives for him. The three brothers are very fond of their sister Rasamani. A rich man from the neighbouring village Chinniampalayam Zamin Rangarajan, feels insulted when Thangarasu mishandles his son Aakash during a temple festival, and to take revenge, he comes with a wedding proposal to make Rasamani his daughter-in-law. At the time of the wedding, the groom's family demands the entire wealth of Selvarasu to be transferred to Rasamani as the dowry, for which Selvarasu and his brothers agree. The brothers are insulted at every opportunity, while Rasamani is also ill-treated by her husband and father in law.

Selvarasu is married to Lakshmi, while Thangarasu is married to his cousin Durga and Chinnarasu is in love with his classmate Priya. Rasamani conceives but still undergoes the torture of her family. Chinnarasu's wedding is arranged with Priya, and the brothers eagerly await for the arrival of Rasamani for the wedding. However, Rasamani is locked up in a room by Aakash, who is not permitting her to attend the wedding. Aakash also injures her feet while she tries to escape from her house with plans of attending the wedding. The brothers come to Rasamani's home requesting her to come for the wedding and are shocked to know that she is hurt and locked in a room. The brothers fight Aakash's goons. Rasamani gets furious and decides to end her relationship with Aakash. She removes the thaali and throws on the face of her husband and decides to go with her brothers. Thereafter, they got back their assets and she lived happily with her brothers.

== Cast ==
- Sarathkumar as Selvarasu
- Murali as Thangarasu
- Manoj Bharathiraja as Chinnarasu
- Kaveri as Rasamani (voice dubbed by Savitha Reddy)
- Abhirami as Lakshmi
- Sindhu Menon as Durga
- Monal as Priya
- Goundamani as Ramanathan
- Manivannan as Sundaram
- Senthil as M. Dharmaraj
- Akash as Akash
- Pyramid Natarajan as Chinnapalayam Zamindar Raja Manikkam
- Priyanka as Kanmani, Bride Girl
- Manjula Vijayakumar as Parvathi
- Thyagu as Minister Thangavelu, Priya's father
- Riyaz Khan as Ramesh, Priya's brother
- Santhana Bharathi as Paramasivam Gounder
- Pandu as College Principal Gopalsamy
- Manobala as Professor Sivaraman
- Vasu Vikram as Maruthamuthu
- Lavanya as Uma
- Crane Manohar as Mani
- Erode Soundar as Koti, Mercenary Hitman
- Radhika (cameo appearance)
- K. S. Ravikumar (guest appearance in song "Vidiya Vidiya")
- Sridhar as dancer (in "Pineapple Vannathodu")

== Production ==
Producer R. B. Choudary's financial problems meant that the director K. S. Ravikumar financed the first schedule of the film by himself. Choudary acknowledged and thanked Ravikumar at the film's audio launch function.

In June 2001, during the shoot of the film in the Mandya district of Karnataka, the team were attacked by angry villagers. The set was trashed and crew was injured. The film's original ending showed Rasamani leaving her husband and going back to her brothers' house. This was later changed to show Rasamani's husband and father-in-law getting reformed and accepting her.

== Soundtrack ==
Sabesh–Murali, brothers of music composer Deva, made their debut as full-fledged composers with this project after composing background music for their brother's films previously. The song "Vidiya Vidiya" is set in the Carnatic raga Arabhi.

Track listing
No.	Title	Lyrics	Singer(s)	Length
1.	"Kaa Vitta"	Pa. Vijay	Mano, Anuradha Sriram
2.	"Kandupidi"	Ilaiyakamban	Hariharan, Ganga
3.	"Azhagana Chinna Devathai"	Kalaikumar	Shankar Mahadevan, Harini
4.	"Vidiya Vidiya"	Viveka	Udit Narayan, Sadhana Sargam
5.	"Pineapple Vannathodu"	Pa Vijay	Shankar Mahadevan, Sujatha Mohan

== Release and reception ==
Samudhiram was released on 31 August 2001. Malathi Rangarajan from The Hindu stated that Samudhiram "is a story of the sincere affection that exists in a family – love that is more filial than fraternal; attachment that is more unnatural than normal". Visual Dasan of Kalki felt Samudhiram is an example of Choudary making many such films as audience are ready to watch these kind of films, he however praised Sabesh–Murali's music, Sindhu's acting and Goundamani and Senthil's humour and concluded saying the director, who understands that cinema is a dream world, can learn to shoot realistically by watching his disciple Cheran.
