= Unnidathil Ennai Koduthen =

1998 film by Vikraman

- Poster
- Directed by: Vikraman
- Written by: Vikraman
- Produced by: G. Venugopal
- Starring: Karthik; Roja
- Cinematography: M. S. Annadurai
- Edited by: V. Jaishankar
- Music by: S. A. Rajkumar
- Production company: Lakshmi Movie Makers
- Release date: 15 August 1998
- Running time: 165 minutes
- Country: India
- Language: Tamil

Unnidathil Ennai Koduthen (transl. I gave myself to you) is a 1998 Indian Tamil-language romantic drama film written and directed by Vikraman. The film stars Karthik and Roja, with Ajith Kumar in a guest appearance. Ramesh Khanna, Moulee, Sathyapriya, Fathima Babu, and Madhan Bob play other supporting roles. It was Karthik's 100th film.

Unnidathil Ennai Koduthen was released on 15 August 1998. It was a huge commercial success and ran for over 250 days at the Tamil Nadu box office. The film was remade in Telugu as Raja, in Kannada as Kanasugara, in Bengali as Shakal Sandhya and in Odia as Mo Duniya Tu Hi Tu.

== Plot ==
Selvam and his friend Bhaskar are petty thieves, who live their lives by stealing stuff from people. One day, they are assigned a job to steal a Ganesh idol from the temple, for a man who had just moved into a new house, citing prosperity as a reason. The friends succeed in stealing the idol but are spotted by the people who start chasing them. They hide in a house and encounter Radha. Radha is a maid in the house and is looking after the owners' three children while the adults are away on a pilgrimage. Radha and the kids secretly lock the two of them in a room and order them to do chores for three days. Radha, while spending time alone in the house with the guys, realizes that they are not bad after all and develops a soft corner for Selvam and he in return, falls for her. The guys are released after three days, the day the owners are to return.

Bhaskar steals Radha's handbag which contains her diary. Selvam reads the diary and finds out that Radha is the illegitimate daughter of Vishwanathan. After her mother's death, Radha meets her father who accepts her as his daughter but has to bring her into the house as a maid. Vishwanathan's wife and her younger sister take an instant dislike to Radha. They treat her with utter disgust and blame her for the tiniest things. Vishwanathan plans to arrange the marriage between Sanjay, his brother-in-law, and Radha. But Sanjay says that although he likes her, he doesn't know if she has the qualities to become his wife and that he would have to think about it and asks for three months time. Radha waits for his reply. Selvam, after reading her diary, feels pity for her and tries to change his ways by working responsibly after Radha's advice. He also hides his feelings for her.

After returning from the trip, Vishwanathan's wife finds out that her diamond necklace is missing. When looking for it, she finds a cigarette bud in one of the drawers. She and her sister scold Radha and throw her out. Selvam, who comes to return her bag, finds out and helps her to accommodate in a hostel. He does many petty works to pay the hostel fees and help Radha. One day, Selvam finds out about Radha's singing talent and tries to help her move on with it. He encounters music director Gangai Amaran late one night and helps him repair his car. In return, he asks the director to help Radha out. Radha, after singing a few songs, becomes a rich and famous singer. She stays in her bungalow with Selvam and Bhaskar.

During an interview, Radha refrains from saying her father's name. Upset, Vishwanathan reveals that he is the father. His wife, looking at Radha's money, accepts Radha as her daughter as well. They come to stay at her house. However, Vishwanathan's wife and sister-in-law does not like Selvam and Bhaskar staying with them. They plan the wedding of Sanjay and Radha, as Sanjay had accepted to marry Radha, long time back. When Radha had gone out of town with Sanjay to receive an award, Vishwanathan's wife and sister-in-law stage a drama that Selvam stole Radha's money and chase him and Bhaskar out. Radha comes back and is shocked. She finds Selvam's diary in his room and understands his love for her.

During an award ceremony, Radha reveals that the reason for her success is not her family but Selvam and she had fallen in love with him. She also chose him as her life partner and tells her desire to marry him. Selvam who had arrived there to drop a passenger, sees it and is called upon the stage when Radha sees him in a TV. In a short flashback, it is shown that Radha had informed Vishwanathan and Sanjay about her love for Selvam and how Sanjay had accepted it. The film ends with Selvam and Radha leaving the place hand in hand.

== Cast ==
- Karthik as Selvam
- Roja as Radha
- Ramesh Khanna as Bhaskar, Selvam's friend
- Moulee as Viswanathan, Radha's father
- Sathyapriya as Janaki, Radha's stepmother
- Madhan Bob as Mahadevan, Radha's uncle
- Fathima Babu as Vasanthi, Radha's aunt
- Vaiyapuri as Delhinger sister
- Singamuthu as Police constable
- Kovai Senthil as House owner
- Sheela
- K. Natraj
- Hemalatha
- James Vasanthan as television interviewer
- Ajith Kumar as Sanjay (guest appearance)
- Gangai Amaran as himself (guest appearance)
- Uma as Uma (guest appearance)
- Ambika as Rani, Radha's late mother (guest appearance)
- Anusha as herself in "Thottabedda Kuliru" song

Special appearances in "Vaanambadiyin" song

- Sarathkumar
- K. S. Ravikumar
- Khushbu
- S. A. Rajkumar
- Deva

== Production ==
After having a 1996 success with the Karthik-starrer Gokulathil Seethai, Lakshmi Movie Makers began their sixth production and launched a film with director Vikraman in February 1998. Unnidathil Ennai Koduthen was set to feature Vijay in the lead role, whom Vikraman worked with in Poove Unakkaga, but production delays meant that the actor was replaced by Karthik. Karthik initially wanted to quit as he felt the story was similar to his earlier film Nandhavana Theru (1995), but after Vikraman assured him it was not, he remained. Meena was initially considered for the female lead, but was unable to accept the role due to date constraints, after which Roja was cast. Swathi was initially approached to appear in a single song sequence for the film, but her refusal led to Anusha being chosen. Sarathkumar and Khushbu made cameo appearances as themselves for a song.

Ajith Kumar revealed that his role in the film was initially supposed to be a full-length role but the character underwent changes after the film started. He continued to play his guest part in the film due to his admiration for his co-actor and the lead actor of the film, Karthik. The success of Unnidathil Ennai Koduthen later led to Karthik making a guest appearance in the Ajith film Anantha Poongatre (1999).

== Soundtrack ==
The soundtrack was composed by S. A. Rajkumar. The famous song from the film, "Edho Oru Paattu", was later adapted by Sanjeev–Darshan in the Hindi film Mann (1999) as "Chaha Hai Tujhko".

Track listing
No.	Title	Lyrics	Singer(s)	Length
1.	"Edho Oru Paattu" (Male version 1)	Kalaikumar	Hariharan	4:26
2.	"Malligai Poove Malligai Poove"	Thamarai	P. Unnikrishnan, Sujatha	4:26
3.	"Edho Oru Paattu" (Male version 2)	Kalaikumar	P. Unnikrishnan	4:26
4.	"Kaatrukku Thudhuvittu"	Ra. Ravishankar	Unnikrishnan, K. S. Chithra	4:42
5.	"Thottabedda Kuliru"	Palani Bharathi	Hariharan	4:16
6.	"Edho Oru Paattu" (Female version)	Kalaikumar	Sujatha	4:26
7.	"Vaanambadiyin"	Ra. Ravishankar	Sujatha	4:17
Total length:				30:59

== Release and reception ==
Unnidathil Ennai Koduthen released on 15 August 1998. It became one of the most successful Tamil films of the year. Ji of Kalki praised the acting of Karthik and Roja, called Rajkumar's music as film's biggest strength while also applauding the picturisation of the songs and added although the film seemed to have ended quickly, it is very elegant without the usual anarchy of villains and stunts. D. S. Ramanujam of The Hindu wrote, "As the admiring and worshipping hero Karthik underplays his role with maturity, Ramesh Khanna evoking guffaws with his antics and utterances. Ajith Kumar in a guest role does a pleasant job. Annadorai's camera work is in keeping with the moods".

== Accolades ==
Occasion	Award	Recipient	Ref.
Tamil Nadu State Film Awards	Third Best Film	Vikraman	
Tamil Nadu State Film Awards	Best Story Writer	Vikraman	
Tamil Nadu State Film Awards	Best Actress	Roja	
Tamil Nadu State Film Awards	Best Cinematographer	Annadurai	
Tamil Nadu State Film Awards	Special Prize	Karthik	
Cinema Express Awards	Best Film	Vikraman	
Cinema Express Awards	Best Actor	Karthik	
Cinema Express Awards	Best Actress	Roja	
