= Erode Soundar =

Indian film writer and director (c.1957–2020)

- Born: c. 1957; Erode, Tamil Nadu, India
- Died: 5 December 2020 (aged 63)
- Occupations: Film director, writer
- Years active: 1991–2020

Erode Soundar (c. 1957 – 5 December 2020) was an Indian film writer and director, who primarily worked on Tamil language films.

== Career ==
In the 1990s, Erode Soundar regularly collaborated with director K. S. Ravikumar on village action films including Cheran Pandiyan (1991), Putham Pudhu Payanam (1991) and Nattamai (1994). The success of Cheran Pandiyan and Nattamai prompted the films to be remade in several languages including Hindi, Telugu, Kannada and Bengali. He also won the Tamil Nadu State Film Award for Best Story Writer award for both films, while also securing the Best Dialogue Writer award for Cheran Pandiyan.

Although he worked primarily as a writer, he also directed a few films including Mudhal Seethanam (1992), where he also acted in a supporting role. His close association with Sarathkumar through K. S. Ravikumar's films, also garnered him the opportunity to direct the actor in Simmarasi (1998). His final film, Ayya Ullen Ayya (2020), had a low profile release and featured his grandson Kabilesh in the lead role.

== Death ==
Soundar died aged 63 on 5 December 2020 following a kidney-related illness.

== Partial filmography ==
Year	Film	Credited for			Notes	Ref.
Year	Film	Writer	Director	Actor	Notes	Ref.
1991	Cheran Pandiyan	Yes		Yes	Tamil Nadu State Film Award for Best Dialogue Writer; Tamil Nadu State Film Award for Best Story Writer	
1992	Periya Gounder Ponnu	Yes				
1991	Putham Pudhu Payanam	Yes		Yes		
1992	Muthal Seethanam	Yes	Yes	Yes		
1994	Nattamai	Yes		Yes	Tamil Nadu State Film Award for Best Story Writer	
1996	Parambarai	Yes		Yes		
1998	Simmarasi	Yes	Yes			
2001	Samudhiram	Yes				
2007	Maa Madurai			Yes		
2008	Dasavathaaram			Yes		
2009	Aadhavan			Yes		
2014	Lingaa			Yes		
2020	Ayya Ullen Ayya	Yes	Yes			
