= Cinema Express Awards =

Indian film award ceremony

- Awarded for: Best Performance film
- Country: India
- Presented by: The New Indian Express
- First award: 1981

Cinema Express Awards are presented annually by Indian Express Group on behalf of Cinema Express film magazine to honour artistic excellence of professionals in the south Indian film industry which comprises Tamil, Telugu, Kannada and Malayalam film industries. The awards were introduced in 1981. From 1987 the awards were extended to many categories.

== Prizes ==
=== Tamil ===
- Cinema Express Award for Best Film – Tamil
- Cinema Express Award for Best Director – Tamil
- Cinema Express Award for Best Actor – Tamil
- Cinema Express Award for Best Actress – Tamil

=== Kannada ===
- Cinema Express Award for Best Film – Kannada
- Cinema Express Award for Best Director – Kannada
- Cinema Express Award for Best Actor – Kannada
- Cinema Express Award for Best Actress – Kannada

=== Telugu ===
- Cinema Express Award for Best Film – Telugu
- Cinema Express Award for Best Director – Telugu
- Cinema Express Award for Best Actor – Telugu
- Cinema Express Award for Best Actress – Telugu

=== Malayalam ===
- Cinema Express Award for Best Film – Malayalam
- Cinema Express Award for Best Director – Malayalam
- Cinema Express Award for Best Actor – Malayalam
- Cinema Express Award for Best Actress – Malayalam

== Events ==
- 7th Cinema Express Awards
- 8th Cinema Express Awards
- 9th Cinema Express Awards
- 10th Cinema Express Awards
- 12th Cinema Express Awards
- 13th Cinema Express Awards
- 14th Cinema Express Awards
