= Sarathkumar =

Sarathkumar is a surname. Notable people with the surname include:

- Radikaa Sarathkumar, Indian actress
- D. Sarathkumar (born 1992), Indian politician
