= Nattamai =

1994 film by K. S. Ravikumar

- Theatrical release poster
- Directed by: K. S. Ravikumar
- Screenplay by: K. S. Ravikumar
- Story by: Erode Soundar
- Produced by: R. B. Choudary
- Starring: Sarathkumar; Meena; Khushbu
- Cinematography: Ashok Rajan
- Edited by: K. Thanikachalam
- Music by: Sirpy
- Production company: Super Good Films
- Release date: 2 November 1994
- Country: India
- Language: Tamil
- Budget: ₹55 lakh

Nattamai (transl. Village Chief) is a 1994 Indian Tamil-language drama film written and directed by K. S. Ravikumar. It stars Sarathkumar in a dual lead role, Meena and Khushbu in the female leads with Vijayakumar appears in a special appearance. The film was released on 2 November 1994, during Diwali, and completed a 175-day run at the box office. It is considered one of the most popular Tamil films of the 1990s and in general. It became a trendsetter for many films in later years. The Goundamani-Senthil comic duo was one of the most popular aspects of the film.

Sarathkumar earned both the Tamil Nadu State Film Award for Best Actor and Filmfare Award for Best Actor – Tamil for his performance in the film. The film was later remade in Telugu as Pedarayudu (1995), in Hindi as Bulandi (2000) and in Kannada as Simhadriya Simha (2002).

== Plot ==
Shanmugam is the village head, fondly called Nattamai in his village in Erode region. He is the Chair of the Village Administration and also the unofficial judge in the village meetings, a post his family has held for generations in his village to do justice. He hears all the cases and gives solutions to the people and even punishments to the wrongdoers. His wife Lakshmi admires and respects him. His brothers Pasupathi and Selvaraj also have a lot of respect for him as he has brought them up as his children. Pasupathi marries Meena, the daughter of an industrialist Rajarathnam. She initially dislikes Shanmugam Nattamai because of his verdicts and attitude and her husband for being so timid with his brother but later transforms after learning of the former's greatness from her father. Selvaraj loves his village bellee Kanmani, who is his paternal aunt Kamatchi's granddaughter.

In the flashback, Dharmalingam, fondly called "Periya Nattamai", the father of Shanmugam, Pasupathi and Selvaraj, orders Kamatchi's son (and Kanmani's father) Rajavelu to marry his servant's daughter whom he raped. Kamatchi (who is Periya Nattamai's sister) had met him the previous day to ask for a false judgement in favour of her son. However, she was told strictly to not interfere with the judgments. His brother-in-law, (Rajavelu's father and Kamatchi's husband, shoots him as he is disappointed by his verdict. Enraged, Periya Nattamai gives his final judgment before dying. He expels Rajavelu's family from the village for 18 years and makes Shanmugam the new Nattamai before dying.

Years later, Rajavelu's father dies. Rajavelu builds envy on his uncle's family and waits for an opportunity to take revenge on them. He hires a woman as the village school teacher and asks her to make Pasupathi fall for her. She does so to save her father who is in Rajavelu's custody. However, Rajavelu kills the teacher and makes the villagers believe that Pasupathi had committed the murder. Shanmugam sentences ten years of exile for Pasupathi and his wife Meena alone accompanies him and they stay in the yard house. Rajavelu learns of his daughter's love for Selvaraj and tries to kill him with the help of his goons. Pasupathi goes to his rescue and a pregnant Meena goes to Shanmugam to convey this message. While Pasupathi starts to take revenge on Rajavelu, Kamatchi rushes to Shanmugam, kills her son Rajavelu and reveals the truth about the death of the teacher and tells Shanmugam that he punished his innocent brother and blamed him for the death of the teacher all of which were really perpetrated by Rajavelu. Shanmugam dies upon learning that he gave a wrong judgment and Pasupathi is shown taking his place as the new Nattamai.

== Cast ==
- R. Sarathkumar in a dual role as
  - Shanmugam (Nattamai)
  - Pasupathi
- Meena as Meena (Voice dubbed by Uma Bharani)
- Khushbu as Lakshmi (Voice dubbed by Durga Sundarrajan)
- Raja Ravindra as Selvaraj
- Sanghavi as Kanmani (Voice dubbed by Savitha Radhakrishnan)
- Manorama as Kamatchi
- Goundamani in a dual role as
  - Kaali Muthu
  - Mangalam
- Senthil as Thanga Muthu
- Ponnambalam as Rajavelu
- Pandu as Sundaramurthy
- Vinu Chakravarthy as Rajarathnam
- Vaishnavi as Rasathi
- Rani as Rani
- Erode Soundar as Zamindar Kathavarayan
- A. K. Senthil as Chinnasamy

Special appearances

- Vijayakumar as "Periya Nattamai" Dharmalingam
- Kanal Kannan
- K. S. Ravikumar
- Crane Manohar as Mani (uncredited)
- Master Mahendran (uncredited)

== Production ==
Director K. S. Ravikumar initially approached Mammootty to play the supporting role played by Vijayakumar. For reasons unknown, he declined the offer. Sarathkumar was then signed for as the lead. The film became the fourth collaboration between Ravikumar and Sarathkumar. When Ravikumar approached Khushbu for Nattamai's wife role, she hesitated as in most part of the film she had to look old, except in a brief flashback. She asked him whom he will cast if she denies, Ravikumar said he will approach veteran actress Lakshmi; this made Kusbhoo to take up this role. Mahendran was introduced as child artist through this film. Vijayakumar was initially cast as the elder brother, but a few days before shooting began, Ravikumar decided to have Sarathkumar play both brothers and Bharathiraja was Ravikumar's initial choice for the character of Vijayakumar.

== Controversy ==
In his early days as an actor, Sarathkumar was considered to be close to AIADMK supremo Jayalalithaa. However, Sarath's proximity to Jayalalithaa landed him in deep trouble when Nattamai, which was still running in Tamil Nadu theatres, was aired by Jayalalithaa's television channel JJ TV, using a U-matic tape, which Sarathkumar gave her for personal viewing at her residence. What the understanding between Jayalalithaa and Sarathkumar was not clear. However, this caused a furore in the film industry as the producer R. B. Choudary threatened action against Sarathkumar for misusing a tape given to him for personal viewing. An embarrassed Sarathkumar explained that he was taken by surprise and that he never expected Jayalalithaa to give it to the channel for telecast. He sought an explanation from both Jayalalitha and JJ TV, but without success. The ruling party reacted predictably, using every forum to attack Sarathkumar.

== Soundtrack ==
Soundtrack was composed by Sirpy and lyrics were written by Vairamuthu.

Song	Singers
"Kambeduthu Vantha Singam"	Mano, K. S. Chithra
"Kotta Paakkum"	S. Janaki, Mano
"Kozhi Kari Kulambu"	K. S. Chithra
"Meena Ponnu"	Mano, Sujatha
"Naan Uravukkaaran"	Mohammed Aslam, Sujatha
"Naattamai"	Malaysia Vasudevan, Sindhu

== Release and reception ==
Nattamai was released on 2 November 1994, during Diwali. The Indian Express wrote that there was "never a dull moment" in the film. Thulasi of Kalki noted Manorama and Vinu Chakravarthy for sentiment, Sangavi for glamour; Vaishnavi to cry; Ponnambalam to get thrashed and die. She said Sirpy's music makes one listen to it again and again even if they remember hearing it somewhere. Thulasi called the comedy routine and concluded by asking why is that the Tamil cinema hero has to be portrayed as a superman even if he is a villager. It became a blockbuster and completed a 175-day run at the box office.

== Legacy ==
The success of the film prompted Super Good Films, K. S. Ravikumar, Erode Soundar and Sarathkumar to announce a film titled Paamaran soon after. However, the project was later stalled owing to a fallout between the actor and the director. Despite discussions for director Vikraman to take over the film, the project was stalled.

Owing to its success, Nattamai was remade in Telugu as Pedarayudu (1995), in Kannada as Simhadriya Simha (2001) and in Hindi as Bulandi (2000).

== In popular culture ==
Nattamai has been parodied and referenced many times. In a comedy scene from Aahaa Enna Porutham (1997), Goundamani mocks at the superstitions of village panchayat saying that chieftain should have assistant tagging along with him and should have a pot of water. Comedian Vivek has parodied this aspect in many films. He did a similar spoof in Sandai (2008) and Thoondil (2008) and made fun of village rituals in Kadhal Sadugudu (2003). Scenes from the film was parodied in Shiva starrer Tamizh Padam (2010), Ponnambalam who did the negative role in the original film had appeared as village chieftain in this film. In 2021, Pothys' Deepavali ad featured Rithvik in six roles, which was noted to be similar to Nattamai.
