= R. B. Choudary =

Indian film producer (1949–2026)

Ratanlal Bhagatram Choudary
- Born: 18 April 1949; Madras, Madras Province, India
- Died: 5 May 2026 (aged 77) near Joontha village, Beawar, Rajasthan, India
- Occupation: Film producer
- Years active: 1988–2026
- Spouse: Mahjabeen
- Children: 4, including Jithan Ramesh and Jiiva

Ratanlal Bhagatram Choudary (18 April 1949 – 5 May 2026) was an Indian film producer who worked in several film industries, predominantly in Tamil and Telugu along with a few films in Malayalam and Hindi. He was the founder of the production company Super Good Films.

== Career ==
R. B. Choudary hailed from a Rajasthani family. He worked in the steel export and jewellery industries before entering film production. He started his career as a producer with Malayalam film industry first and produced a few films under "Super" banner. In 1989, he entered Tamil film industry and produced films on 'Super' banner in partnership with R. Mohan, who manufactured "Good Knight" mosquito mats. When they decided to part ways, Choudary borrowed good from 'Good Knight' and renamed his production house Super Good Films.

== Personal life and death ==
Choudhary married Mahjabeen, a Tamilian woman and had four sons: Suresh produces films at their home production Super Good Films, Jeevan is a businessman who runs a steel company, Jithan Ramesh is an actor and producer, and the youngest son Jiiva is an actor.

He was the president of the Sri Seervi Samaj Mahasabha in Tamil Nadu.

Choudhary died in a car collision near Beawar, Rajasthan on 5 May 2026 while on route to a family wedding with his nephew. In an attempt to avoid hitting a herd of cows, the driver swerved the car into a roadside barrier; while the driver and nephew survived with injuries and were hospitalised, Choudhary died on spot.

== Awards ==
A list of awards received by R. B. Choudary include:

Filmfare Awards

- 1990 – Filmfare Award for Best Film – Tamil - Pudhu Vasantham
- 1999 – Filmfare Award for Best Film – Telugu - Raja
- 2001 – Filmfare Award for Best Film – Tamil - Aanandham

Tamil Nadu State Film Awards

- 1990 – Tamil Nadu State Film Award for Best Film (1st) - Pudhu Vasantham
- 1991 – Tamil Nadu State Film Award Special Prize - Cheran Pandiyan
- 1993 – Tamil Nadu State Film Award for Best Film (3rd) - Gokulam
- 1994 – Tamil Nadu State Film Award for Best Film (1st) - Naatamai
- 1997 – Tamil Nadu State Film Award for Best Film (1st) - Suryavamsam
- 1999 – Tamil Nadu State Film Award for Best Film (2nd) - Thullatha Manamum Thullum
- 2001 – Tamil Nadu State Film Award for Best Film (3rd) - Aanandham

Cinema Express Awards

- 1994 – Cinema Express Award for Best Film – Tamil - Naatamai
- 1997 – Cinema Express Award for Best Film – Tamil - Suryavamsam
- 1998 – Cinema Express Award for Best Film – Tamil - Unnidathil Ennai Koduthen
- 2001 – Cinema Express Award for Best Film – Tamil - Aanandham
