= Tippu (singer) =

Indian playback singer (born 1978)

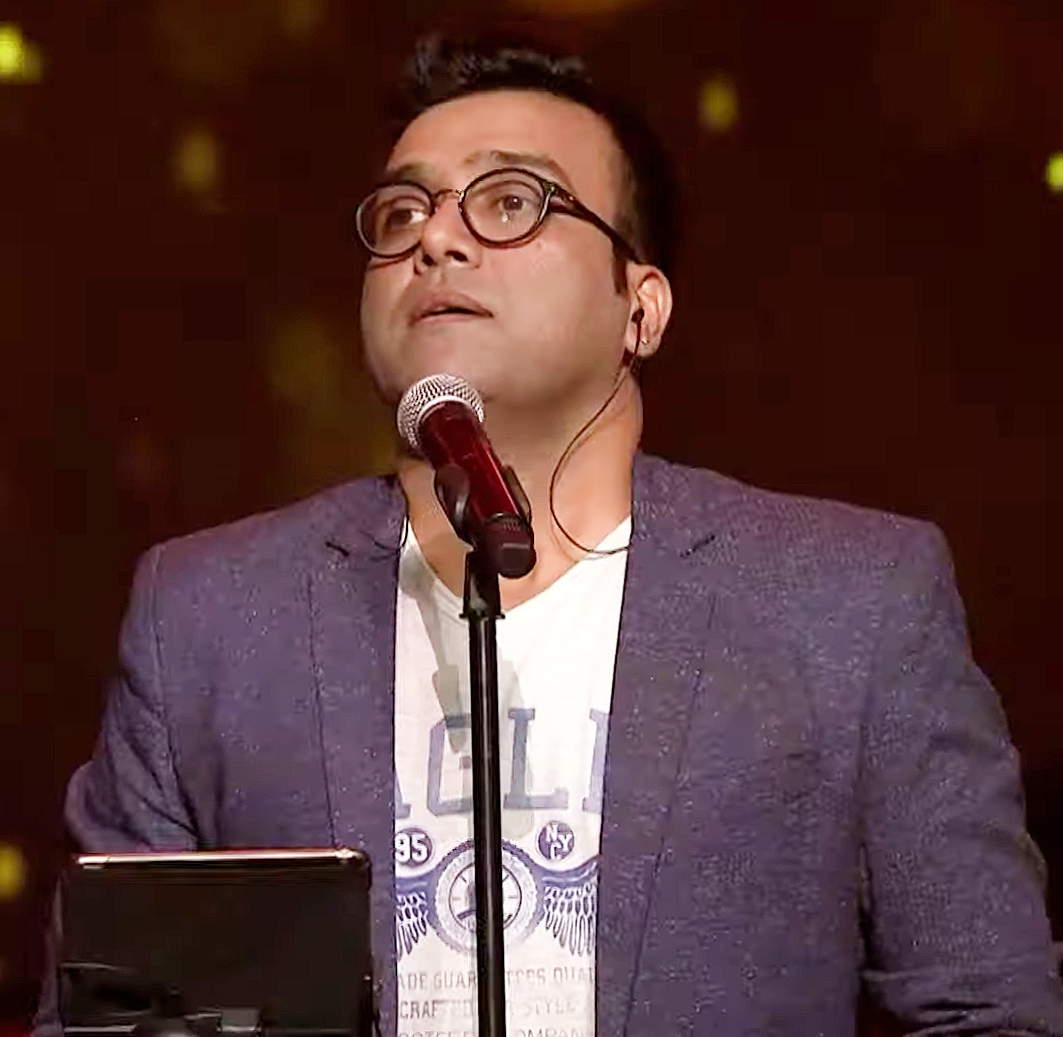
- Born: Ekhaambarresh Lakshmi Narayanan; 1 November 1978 (age 48); Tiruchirappalli, Tamil Nadu, India
- Occupation: Singer
- Years active: 1998–present
- Spouse: Harini (m. 2002)
- Children: 2 including Sai Abhyankkar

Ekambaresh Lakshmi Narayanan (born 1 November 1978), better known by his stage name Tippu, is an Indian playback singer who has performed several songs in Tamil, Kannada, and Telugu languages apart from a few Malayalam songs.

== Personal life ==
Tippu married playback singer Harini when they both were 24 years. They have a daughter named Sai Smriti and son, Sai Abhyankkar, who made his singing debut with the single "Katchi Sera" in 2024.

== Discography ==
=== Tamil discography ===
Year	Film	Song	Composer	Co-Singers
2001	Minnale	"Oh Mama Mama"	Harris Jayaraj	Shankar Mahadevan
2001	Minnale	"Venmathi"	Harris Jayaraj	Roopkumar Rathod
2001	Minnale	"Poopol Poopol"	Harris Jayaraj	Karthik
2001	Dhill	"Oh Nanbaney"	Vidyasagar	Karthik, K. S. Chithra
2001	Citizen	"Merkey Vidhaitha Sooriyane"	Deva	
2001	Majunu	"Hari Gori"	Harris Jayaraj	Karthik, Devan Ekambaram, Ganga, Febi Mani
2001	Dumm Dumm Dumm	"Athan Varuvaga"	Karthik Raja	Harini, Karthik, Chitra Sivaraman, Malgudi Subha
2001	Badri	"Stella Maris Laara"	Ramana Gogula	Vivek, Dhamu
2001	Asathal	"Shock Adicha Mathiri"	Bharadwaj	Ganga
2001	Sonnal Thaan Kaadhala	"Chukkumala Chukkumala"	T. Rajendar	Silambarasan
2001	Alli Thandha Vaanam	"Chikku Chikku Joy"	Vidyasagar	
2001	Azhagana Naatkal	"Adi Devathaiye"	Deva	'Mahanadhi' Shobana
2001	Love Marriage	"Apple Ondru"	Deva	
2001	Pathinaru Vayathinile (album)	"Seetha Kalyanam"	T. S. Muralidharan	
2001	Pathinaru Vayathinile (album)	"Madura Mailu Eiva"	T. S. Muralidharan	Meena
2002	Samurai	"Moongil Kadugale"	Harris Jayaraj	Hariharan
2002	Style	"Style"	Bharani	
2002	Kadhal Virus	"Bailamore"	A. R. Rahman	Silambarasan
2002	Youth	"Old Model Laila"	Mani Sharma	
2002	Lesa Lesa	"Mudhal Mudhalai"	Harris Jayaraj	Yugendran, Srimathumitha
2002	Thamizhan	"Hot Party"	D. Imman	Mathangi
2002	Unnai Ninaithu	"Chocklet Chocklet"	Sirpy	
2002	Red	"Thai Madiyae"	Deva	
2002	Vivaramana Aalu	"Yei Maamaa"	Deva	Mathangi
2002	Dhaya	"Annathe Nadantha"	Bharadwaj	
2002	Dhaya	"Dhaya Dhaya Oorellam"	Bharadwaj	
2002	Kannathil Muthamittal	"Sundari"	A. R. Rahman	Hariharan, Sujatha, Karthik, Srimathumitha
2002	Charlie Chaplin	"Mammu Mammu"	Bharani	
2002	Charlie Chaplin	"Ponnu Oruthi Summa"	Bharani	Anuradha Sriram
2002	Charlie Chaplin	"Shansha Shalpashaa"	Bharani	Harini
2002	Roja Kootam	"Azhagin Azhage Nee"	Bharadwaj	
2002	Junior Senior	"Pudhusai Pudhusai"	Yuvan Shankar Raja	Srinivas
2002	Varushamellam Vasantham	"Hello Darling"	Sirpy	
2002	Pesatha Kannum Pesume	“Chikkango”	Bharani	Swarnalatha
2002	Pesatha Kannum Pesume	“Udhadugal”	Bharani	Swarnalatha
2002	Enge Enadhu Kavithai	"Pattu Nirathil"	Bharadwaj	
2002	Guruvamma	“Thoda Thoda”	Arivumathi	
2002	Sri	"Yaamirukka Bayamein"	T. S. Muralidharan	Vikram, Shankar Mahadevan
2002	Sri	"Kannae Mozhi Vendam"	T. S. Muralidharan	
2002	Sundhara Travels	"Adada Oorkulathil"	Bharani	Swarnalatha
2002	Sundhara Travels	"Sundara Travels"	Bharani	
2002	King	"Kulu Kulu Kaatre"	Dhina	
2002	King	"Loveaagi En Nenje"	Dhina	
2002	Arputham	"Pothunda Pothunda"	Shiva	
2002	Samasthanam	"Penne Penne"	Deva	Unnikrishnan, Harini, Ganga
2002	Samasthanam	"Eswaraa Eswaraa"	Deva	Karthik
2002	Album	"Thathalikudhey"	Karthik Raja	Karthik, Sadhana Sargam
2002	Album	"Nilave Nilave"	Karthik Raja	Shankar Mahadevan
2002	University	"Kiss Adippom"	Ramesh Vinayakam	Mathangi, Ramesh Vinayakam
2002	Andipatti Arasampatti	"Andipatti Arasampatti"	Rock Rownder	
2002	Kadhal Azhivathillai	"Maara Maara"	T. Rajendar	Annupamaa
2002	Ramanaa	"Angey Yaaru Paaru"	Ilaiyaraaja	Karthik, S. N. Surendar, Yuvan Shankar Raja
2002	Villain	“Hello Hello”	Vidyasagar	Sadhana Sargam, Anuradha Sriram, Clinton Cerejo
2002	Gummalam	“Thitraanga”	Gandhidasan	
2002	I Love You Da	"Adicha Sixaru" (I)	Bharadwaj	
2002	Mutham	"La La La"	Bharani	Harini
2002	Mutham	"Saturday Saturday"	Bharani	
2002	Virumbugiren	"Nijama Nijama"	Deva	Sadhana Sargam
2003	Dhool	"Inthadi Kappakilange"	Vidyasagar	Kalyan, Rafi
2003	Saamy	"Veppamaram"	Harris Jayaraj	
2003	Kaakha Kaakha	"Ennai Konjam"	Harris Jayaraj	Timmy, Pop Shalini
2003	Pudhiya Geethai	"Naan Odum"	Yuvan Shankar Raja	Mano
2003	Pudhiya Geethai	"Annamalai"	Yuvan Shankar Raja	Devan Ekambaram
2003	Pudhiya Geethai	"Manase"	Yuvan Shankar Raja	Bonnie Chakraborty, Swarnalatha
2003	Anbe Sivam	"Elae Machi" (Reprise)	Vidyasagar	Udit Narayan
2003	Thithikudhe	"Oru Nimidamaa"	Vidyasagar	Srivardhini
2003	Thirumalai	"Thaamthakka Dheemthakka"	Vidyasagar	Karthik
2003	Thirumalai	"Dhimsu Katta"	Vidyasagar	Srilekha Parthasarathy
2003	Iyarkai	"Kaadhal Vandhaal"	Vidyasagar	Manikka Vinayagam
2003	Boys	"Girlfriend"	A. R. Rahman	Karthik, Timmy
2003	Jayam	"Thiruvizhannu Vandha"	R. P. Patnaik	Gowri, Raja, Ravi
2003	Jayam	"Vandi Vandi"	R. P. Patnaik	
2003	Kalatpadai	"Varudhu Varudhu"	Bharadwaj	Timmy, Pop Shalini
2003	Ramachandra	"Thillaiyaadi"	Deva	Anuradha Sriram
2003	Pop Carn	"Poovellam Paaraddum"	Yuvan Shankar Raja	Karthik, Pop Shalini
2003	Aasai Aasaiyai	"Ilamai Enbathu"	Mani Sharma	Ranjith
2003	Anbu	"Manapponnu Azhaga"	Vidyasagar	Srivardhini
2003	Anbu	"Sutti Payale"	Vidyasagar	Vasundhara Das
2003	Student Number 1	"Kuchipudi Kaina"	M. M. Keeravani	Kalpana
2003	Student Number 1	"Salute Podu"	M. M. Keeravani	
2003	Pallavan	"Oho nu Sollu"	Vidyasagar	Timmy
2003	Manasellam	"Highwasiley Ley Ley"	Ilaiyaraaja	S. N. Surendar, Karthik
2003	Pavalakodi	"Spencer Plaza Naduvil"	Sirpy	
2003	Pavalakodi	"Naan Un Pinnadi"	Sirpy	Reshmi
2003	Kadhal Sadugudu	"Carolinaa"	Deva	Yugendran
2003	Kadhal Sadugudu	"Sungadhi Shellai"	Deva	Mano, Pop Shalini
2003	Kadhal Sadugudu	"Melisai Thudikudhu"	Deva	Mano
2003	Sena	"Suthi Suthi Varuven"	D. Imman	Srilekha Parthasarathy
2003	Arasu	"Ilesha Kattumaram"	Mani Sharma	Kalpana
2003	Punnagai Poove	"Thilaakkaeni Ganaa"	Yuvan Shankar Raja	Karthik
2003	Parthiban Kanavu	"Theeradha Dum"	Vidyasagar	Devan Ekambaram, Manikka Vinayagam
2003	Aahaa Ethanai Azhagu	"Aattukutty Ellam"	Vidyasagar	
2003	Kadhal Kisu Kisu	"Aalum Velum"	Vidyasagar	Udit Narayan
2003	Kadhal Kisu Kisu	"Kabadi Kabadi"	Vidyasagar	Karthik, Ganga, Pop Shalini, Febi Mani
2003	Kadhal Kisu Kisu	"Kadhal Kisu Kisu"	Vidyasagar	Premgi Amaren
2003	Thayumanavan	"Puyal Adikkakandomey"	Vaigundavasaan	Roshini
2003	Diwan	"Ayyayyo"	S. A. Rajkumar	Sujatha
2003	Success	"Kodi Muppathu"	Deva	Kovai Kamala
2003	Alai	"Paiya Paiya"	Vidyasagar	Mathangi
2003	Aalukkoru Aasai	"Iduppodu Sungidi"	S. A. Rajkumar	Anuradha Sriram
2003	Ragasiyamai	"Raavodu Raava"	Karthik Raja	
2003	Ragasiyamai	"Thevayilla Thevayilla"	Karthik Raja	
2003	Winner	"Mathapoo"	Yuvan Shankar Raja	Premgi Amaren, Srivardhini
2003	Anjaneya	"Ovvoru Naalum"	Mani Sharma	
2003	Unnai Paartha Naal Mudhal (D)	"Kadhal Kadhal"	M. M. Keeravani	Anuradha Sriram
2003	Anbe Un Vasam	"Color Varadhu"	Dhina	Manikka Vinayagam, Srividya
2003	Joot	"Kattabomma Kattabomma"	Vidyasagar	Nandini Srikar
2003	Joot	"Aadivarum Azhagiya"	Vidyasagar	Manikka Vinayagam, Karthik
2003	Indru	"Shokka Adikkura"	Deva	Anuradha Sriram
2003	Sindhamal Sitharamal	"Lub Tub"	Bharani	
2003	Sindhamal Sitharamal	"Kalangathe"	Bharani	
2004	Ghilli	"Soora Thenga"	Vidyasagar	
2004	Madhurey	"Elanthapazham"	Vidyasagar	Anuradha Sriram
2004	Virumaandi	"Andha Kandamani"	Ilaiyaraaja	Ilaiyaraaja, Kamal Haasan, Karthik Raja, S. N. Surendar
2004	Virumaandi	"Karbagraham"	Ilaiyaraaja	Ilaiyaraaja, Kamal Haasan, Karthik Raja, S. N. Surendar
2004	Arul	"Ukkadathu Pappadame"	Harris Jayaraj	L. R. Eswari, Theni Kunjarammal
2004	Arul	"Punnakunnu"	Harris Jayaraj	Palakkad Sreeram
2004	Kovil	"Silu Silu"	Harris Jayaraj	
2004	Kovil	"Kadhal Panna"	Harris Jayaraj	Kovai Kamala, Silambarasan, Vadivelu
2004	Oru Murai Sollividu	"I Love You Solli"	Bharadwaj	Pop Shalini
2004	Engal Anna	"Konji Konji"	Deva	P. Jayachandran, Ganga
2004	Jai	"Aazhaku Neyya"	Mani Sharma	Kalpana
2004	Vayasu Pasanga	"Kamman Kattu Moolai"	R. K. Sundar	Prabhakar, A. R. Reihana
2004	Kamaraj	"Naadu Paarthathunda"	Ilaiyaraaja	Ganga
2004	Kamaraj	"Senthamil Naadenum"	Ilaiyaraaja	Ganga
2004	Ennavo Pudichirukku	"Thithike Thithike"	Subhash Jawahar	Sujatha
2004	Campus	"Ini Oru Vidhi"	Rajneesh	Timmy
2004	Campus	"Ahimsaidhaan"	Rajneesh	
2004	Campus	"Thodaa Thodaa"	Rajneesh	
2004	Adi Thadi	"Thagadu Thagadu"	Deva	Deva, Ganga
2004	Aethirree	"Thamizhnaatu Pennai"	Yuvan Shankar Raja	Pop Shalini
2004	Jana	"Thakathimi Thakathimi"	Dhina	
2004	Jore	"Muttikkalama"	Deva	Manikka Vinayagam
2004	Jore	"Un Uthattukku"	Deva	Pop Shalini
2004	Super Da	"Iduppu Madippu"	Deva	Mathangi
2004	Sema Ragalai	"Thulluvatho Ilamai"	Simmam Kumar	Chinmayi
2004	Sema Ragalai	"Thuli Thuli Mazhiyinil"	Simmam Kumar	
2004	Sema Ragalai	"Dhil Irukku"	Simmam Kumar	
2004	Sound Party	"Raasathi"	Deva	Harini
2004	Kudaikul Mazhai	"Onnu Rendu Moonu"	Karthik Raja	
2004	Vishwa Thulasi	"Engu Piranthathu"	M. S. Viswanathan	Chinmayi
2004	Vishwa Thulasi	“En Maname”	M. S. Viswanathan	Gopika Poornima
2004	Neranja Manasu	"Kelappu Kelappu"	Karthik Raja	
2004	Attahasam	"Unakkenna Unakkenna"	Bharadwaj	
2004	Attahasam	"Thala Pola Varuma"	Bharadwaj	Donnan, Arjun Thomas
2004	Attahasam	"Attagasam"	Bharadwaj	Donnan, Ujjayinee Roy, Arjun Thomas
2004	Dreams	"Alai Alaiyai"	Bharadwaj	Malathy
2004	Jai Soorya	"Madha Madha"	Deva	Anuradha Sriram
2004	Jananam	"Sushmitha Kiss Thantha"	Bharadwaj	
2004	Jananam	"Sudum Varai Neruppu"	Bharadwaj	Karthik, Timmy, Yugendran, MK Balaji
2004	Kaadhal	"Poovum Pudikkudhu”	Joshua Sridhar	Krish, Pop Shalini
2004	Kaadhal	"Pura Koondu"	Joshua Sridhar	Suresh Peters, Harish Raghavendra, Premgi Amaren, Karunas
2005	Chandramukhi	"Raa Raa"	Vidyasagar	Binny Krishnakumar
2005	Chandramukhi	"Kokku Para Para"	Vidyasagar	Manikka Vinayagam, Rajalakshmee Sanjay, Ganga
2005	Mazhai	"Kuchikaruvadu"	Devi Sri Prasad	Srilekha Parthasarathy
2005	Aaru	"Paakadha"	Devi Sri Prasad	Sumangali
2005	Ullam Ketkumae	"Kanavugal"	Harris Jayaraj	Karthik, O. S. Arun, Premgi Amaren, Febi Mani, Pop Shalini, Suchitra
2005	Thirupaachi	"Nee Entha Ooru"	Dhina	
2005	Sivakasi	"Kodambakkam Area"	Srikanth Deva	Shoba Chandrasekar
2005	Girivalam	"Nee Yaaro Nee Yaaro"	Deva	Harini
2005	Ayya	"Suththipoda Venaama"	Bharadwaj	Srimathumitha
2005	Kannamma	"Ennai Ethanai"	S. A. Rajkumar	Pop Shalini
2005	Sukran	"Un Paarvai"	Vijay Antony	Sangeetha Rajeshwaran
2005	Mannin Maindhan	"Yeamma Yeamma"	Bharadwaj	Sujatha
2005	Raam	"Boom Boom"	Yuvan Shankar Raja	Yuvan Shankar Raja, Jyotsna, Premgi Amaren
2005	Maayavi	"Jo Jo Jothika"	Devi Sri Prasad	Sudha
2005	London	"Kee Mu Kee Pee"	Vidyasagar	Karthik, Pravin Mani
2005	Jathi	"Shiyo Shiyo"	Agni Kalaivani	
2005	Jathi	"Ada Oththakada"	Agni Kalaivani	Rajalakshmi
2005	Karagattakkari	"Enga Ooru Laila"	Ilaiyaraaja	Manjari
2005	Karagattakkari	"Oththa Rooba"	Ilaiyaraaja	Malathy
2005	Gurudeva	"Aanandham Aanandham"	Sabesh–Murali	Mathangi
2005	Gurudeva	"Manakudhada"	Sabesh–Murali	
2005	Sevvel	"Sivanoda"	Aasan	
2005	Mumbai Xpress	"Kurangu Kaiyil Maalai"	Ilaiyaraaja	Kamal Haasan
2005	Kana Kandaen	"Chinna Chinna"	Vidyasagar	Sunitha Sarathy
2005	Padhavi Paduthum Paadu	"Intha Kaadu"	Gandhidasan	
2005	Kaatrullavarai	"Rahala Kattungada"	Bharani	
2005	Alaiyadikkuthu	"Machi Machi"	Bharani	Mahathi
2005	Chidambarathil Oru Appasamy	"Ayya Enna"	Ilaiyaraaja	Manjari
2005	Chidambarathil Oru Appasamy	"Pudhusa Nenachikittu"	Ilaiyaraaja	Ranjith
2005	Oru Naal Oru Kanavu	"Ponnukitta Mappilai"	Ilaiyaraaja	Manjari
2005	Chanakya	“Onnu Vaanguna”	Srikanth Deva	Anuradha Sriram
2005	Kundakka Mandakka	"8 Thisaigal"	Bharadwaj	
2005	Kasthuri Maan	"Ketkalyo"	Ilaiyaraaja	Manjari
2005	Kasthuri Maan	"Ennai Ketkum"	Ilaiyaraaja	
2005	Kasthuri Maan	"Vaanin Kadhal"	Ilaiyaraaja	Manjari, Ganga
2005	Majaa	"Hey Pangaali"	Vidyasagar	Udit Narayan, Manikka Vinayagam
2005	Saadhuriyan	"Kannamma Kannamma"	Deva	Anuradha Sriram
2005	Vetrivel Sakthivel	"Azhaguna Azhagu"	Srikanth Deva	Anuradha Sriram
2006	Unakkum Enakkum	"Something Something"	Devi Sri Prasad	
2006	Vettaiyaadu Vilaiyaadu	"Karka Karka"	Harris Jayaraj	Devan Ekambaram, Nakul, Andrea Jeremiah
2006	Veyil	"Veyilodu Vilayadi"	G. V. Prakash Kumar	Kailash Kher, Jassie Gift, Prasanna
2006	Veyil	"Ooran Thotathhilae"	G. V. Prakash Kumar	Jassie Gift
2006	Aathi	"Yae Durra"	Vidyasagar	Saindhavi
2006	Paramasivan	"Natchathira Paravaikku"	Vidyasagar	Rajalakshmi
2006	Paramasivan	"Paramasivane"	Vidyasagar	Shankar Mahadevan, Chandran, Karthik, Jemon, Ranjith
2006	Pasa Kiligal	"Thangai Endra"	Vidyasagar	Karthik, Sujatha, Manorama
2006	Pasa Kiligal	"Meesai Mutham"	Vidyasagar	Sujatha
2006	Madrasi	"Kadhal Vaaram Kondata"	D. Imman	Ranjith, Suchitra
2006	Oru Kadhal Seiveer	"Gigu Gimba"	Bharani	
2006	Theenda Theenda	"Pudhu Malare"	Shankar–Ganesh	Sridevi
2006	Thirupathi	"Pudhu Veedu"	Bharadwaj	Anuradha Sriram
2006	Madhu	"Nilavai Sutri"	Ilaiyaraaja	
2006	Naalai	"Kattabomman"	Karthik Raja	
2006	Naalai	"Arai Adi Thoorathil"	Karthik Raja	Rita, Ranjith
2006	Naalai	"Idi Mayalogam"	Karthik Raja	Malgudi Subha, Ranjith
2006	Kusthi	"Roottu Pudichom"	D. Imman	Srinivas
2006	Uyir	"Convent Sollitharum"	Joshua Sridhar	Natash, Dhanni
2006	Thullura Vayasu	"Kadal Pola"	Karthik Raja	
2006	Imsai Arasan 23rd Pulikecei	"Pootiya Sirayinai"	Sabesh–Murali	
2006	Thoothukudi	"Karuvappaiya"	Pravin Mani	K. S. Chithra
2006	Nee Venunda Chellam	"Kanniponnu"	Dhina	
2006	Em Magan	"Unnoduthaan Ini"	Vidyasagar	Subhiksha
2006	Jambhavan	"Halwa Ponnu"	Bharadwaj	Roshini
2006	Perarasu	"Vaada Vaada"	Pravin Mani	
2006	Sengathu	"Kathu Visuthada"	Arafin Yusuf	Theni Kunjarammal
2006	E	"Theepori Parakkum"	Srikanth Deva	
2006	Thalaimagan	"Nooru Nooru" (II)	Srikanth Deva	Priyadarshini
2006	Mann	"Landanukku Pogavillai"	German Vijay	R. Sathya, T. K. Kala
2006	Nenjirukkum Varai	"Mambazham Vikkara"	Srikanth Deva	Puliyanthoppu Pazhani, Devakumar
2006	Azhagiya Asura	"Pondy Bazaar"	Brahma	
2006	Poi	"Hitler Penne"	Vidyasagar	Sujatha
2007	Vel	"Kovakkara Kiliye"	Yuvan Shankar Raja	Sujatha
2007	Chennai 600028	"Jalsa"	Yuvan Shankar Raja	Ranjith, Haricharan, Karthik, Premgi Amaren
2007	Malaikottai	"Yeh Aatha"	Mani Sharma	Anuradha Sriram
2007	Agaram	"Tappu Egirippogum"	Yuvan Shankar Raja	Pushpavanam Kuppusamy
2007	Mozhi	"Aazha Kannaal"	Vidyasagar	
2007	Muruga	"Melathe Kottu"	Karthik Raja	Sujatha, Malgudi Subha
2007	Thirumagan	"Poranthathu"	Deva	
2007	Sabari	"Aavana Aakkana"	Mani Sharma	Sujatha
2007	Manikanda	"Inji Murappa"	Deva	Anuradha Sriram
2007	Manikanda	“Mama Mama”	Deva	Anuradha Sriram
2007	Koodal Nagar	"Aayiram Thalaiyapaathu"	Sabesh–Murali	
2007	Kaanal Neer	"Chella Chella"	Suresh-Bobby	Saindhavi, Vijay Yesudas
2007	Kaanal Neer	"Poonthottam"	Suresh-Bobby	
2007	Maya Kannadi	"Oru Mayalogam"	Ilaiyaraaja	Manjari
2007	Parattai Engira Azhagu Sundaram	"Engeda Azhagundhan"	Gurukiran	Rita
2007	Achacho	"Paathugoda"	M. K. S. Narula Khan	Mahathi
2007	Kasu Irukkanum	"Madura Pakkam"	Kavin Saradha & Raj Shankar	Anusha
2007	Niram	"Oru Erimalai"	Sabesh–Murali	
2007	Thiru Ranga	"Pollachi"	Srikanth Deva	Anuradha Sriram, Roshini
2007	Karuppusamy Kuththagaithaarar	"Naalu Gopuram"	Dhina	Chinnaponnu
2007	Paali	"Route Route"	Bhagwat	
2007	Rasigar Mandram	"Vaararu Vaararu"	S. P. Boopathy	
2007	Aarya	"Ennangira Nee"	Mani Sharma	Anuradha Sriram
2007	Cheena Thaana 001	"Cheena Thana"	Deva	
2007	Thirutham	"Paadhai Therigiradhu"	Pravin Mani	
2007	Vegam	"Kya Bole"	Rajhesh Vaidhya	Harini
2007	Pazhaniappa Kalloori	"Pattam Poochi"	R. P. Patnaik	
2007	Pazhaniappa Kalloori	"Vaa Endral"	R. P. Patnaik	
2008	Santosh Subramaniam	"Yeppadi Irundha"	Devi Sri Prasad	Gopika Poornima
2008	Kadhalil Vizhunthen	"Solladi"	Vijay Antony	
2008	Poo	"Maaman Engirukka"	S. S. Kumaran	Harini, Karthik, Master Rohith
2008	Pazhani	"Ellam Valla Iraiva"	Srikanth Deva	
2008	Indiralohathil Na Azhagappan	"Poi Kaal Kuditharai"	Sabesh–Murali	
2008	Valluvan Vasuki	"Oor Oranga"	S. A. Rajkumar	Shweta Mohan
2008	Theekuchi	"Iyra Meenu"	Srikanth Deva	
2008	Inba	"Alankatti"	P. B. Balaji	Pop Shalini
2008	Azhagu Nilayam	"Ragasiya Veppam"	Sabesh–Murali	Pop Shalini
2008	Vedha	"Achamillai Achamillai"	Srikanth Deva	Archith
2008	Kadhal Endral Enna	"Kadhal Endral Enna"	K. Bharathi	Sreekanth
2008	Kadhal Endral Enna	"Unnai Nenacha"	K. Bharathi	Anuradha Sriram
2008	Kathavarayan	"Oru Haiku"	Srikanth Deva	Suchitra
2008	Muniyandi Vilangial Moonramandu	"Imayamalayum" (Remix)	Vidyasagar	Jayamoorthy, Manikka Vinayagam
2008	Muniyandi Vilangial Moonramandu	"Kombuvitta Kaalayenna"	Vidyasagar	
2008	Uliyin Osai	"Azhagai"	Ilaiyaraaja	Shweta Mohan
2008	Unnai Naan	"Munnadiyum Parthen"	Joe Arulraj	
2008	Jayamkondaan	"Ullaasa Ulagam"	Vidyasagar	
2008	Vasool	"Jhinduku Jhindhaa"	Vijay Shankar	
2008	Kathikappal	"Aiya Vandharu Ithu Nalla Neramthan"	Sree Sai	
2008	Seval	"Namma Ooru Nallaarukku"	G. V. Prakash Kumar	Manikka Vinayagam, Anuradha Sriram, Mahathi, Shreya Ghoshal, Prashanthini
2008	Thenavattu	"Onnu Rendu"	Srikanth Deva	Ganga
2008	Mahesh, Saranya Matrum Palar	"En Uyirukkul"	Vidyasagar	Rajalakshmi
2008	Surya	"Veeradhi Veeranada"	Jerome Pushparaj	
2008	Surya	"Padaiyedu"	Jerome Pushparaj	Mervin
2009	Thoranai	"Manjasela Mandakini"	Mani Sharma	Saindhavi
2009	Villu	"Vaada Mappiley"	Devi Sri Prasad	Rita, Vadivelu
2009	Satrumun Kidaitha Thagaival	"Pichavaram"	Bala	
2009	Adada Enna Azhagu	"Kummu Kummu"	T. M. Jayamurugan & Jeevan Thomas	Suchitra, Kalyani
2009	Karthik Anitha	"Ayyayyayo"	Jack Anand	Manikka Vinayagam
2009	Naal Natchathiram	"Success Valkaiye"	R. Rajpavan	
2009	Oliyum Oliyum	"Kadhalika Porendi"	Yanidesh	
2009	Oliyum Oliyum	"Mukka Mozham"	Yanidesh	
2009	Oliyum Oliyum	"Bambarakattai"	Yanidesh	Sai
2009	Vaalmiki	"Rekka Katti Parakthu"	Ilaiyaraaja	Rahul Nambiar
2009	Gnabagangal	"Ennadi"	James Vick	Anuradha Sriram
2009	Gnabagangal	"Unnal Mudiyum"	James Vick	
2009	Unnai Kann Theduthe	"O Nathiya Va Nathiya"	Sirpy	Janaki Iyer
2009	Pudhiya Payanam	"Enna Othaiyila"	Prasad Ganesh	Roshini
2009	Malayan	"Tharecha Sollugo"	Dhina	Anuradha Sriram
2009	Anthony Yaar?	"Kattu Marathila"	Dhina	
2009	Azhagar Malai	"Enna Senjalum"	Ilaiyaraaja	Poni
2009	Nesi	"Algebra"	Sirpy	
2009	Nesi	"Kalar"	Sirpy	
2009	Kannukulle	"Paattu Ketka"	Ilaiyaraaja	Rahul Nambiar, Prasanna, Mukesh Mohamed, Velmurugan, Bhavatharini
2009	Kanden Kadhalai	"Oru Naal Iravil"	Vidyasagar	Benny Dayal
2009	Adhe Neram Adhe Idam	"Mudhal Murai"	Premgi Amaren	Harini, Haricharan
2009	Mathiya Chennai	"Ilavayasu Pasanga"	Ilaiyaraaja	Vijay Yesudas, Rahul Nambiar
2009	Mathiya Chennai	"Sullikuppam Ganapathy"	Ilaiyaraaja	Vijay Yesudas, Rahul Nambiar
2009	Kandhakottai	"Kala Kala Kandha Kottai"	Dhina	
2010	Singam	"En Idhayam"	Devi Sri Prasad	Suchitra
2010	Thairiyam	"Mathura Maliye"	R. D. Mohan Singh	Malathy
2010	Veerasekaran	"Yai Thozha"	Sajan Madhav	
2010	Guru Sishyan	"Aandava Andava"	Dhina	
2010	Irumbukkottai Murattu Singam	"Ilantamizha"	G. V. Prakash Kumar	
2010	Magane En Marumagane	"Poda Vengayam"	Dhina	Ganga
2010	Veluthu Kattu	"Kirratha"	Bharani	
2010	Moscowin Kavery	"Gramam Thedi Vaada"	S. Thaman	Ranjith, Rita
2010	Unakkaga En Kadhal	"Unakkaka En Kadhal" (duet)	Sanjeev–Darshan	Sadhana Sargam
2010	Drohi	"Sama Sama Yama Yama"	V. Selvaganesh	Silambarasan, Karthik, Maya
2010	Naane Ennul Illai	"Neeyaruda Naanyaruda"	Amresh Ganesh	
2010	Vallakottai	"Magadheera Magadheera"	Dhina	Srimathumitha
2010	Raththa Sarithiram (D)	"Sathathin Soodhattam"		
2010	Raththa Sarithiram (D)	"Thuninju Vettiven"		
2010	Raththa Sarithiram (D)	"Kollada"		
2011	Kaavalan	"Vinnai Kaapan"	Vidyasagar	Shweta Mohan
2011	Ko	"Gala Gala"	Harris Jayaraj	Krish, Haricharan, Sayanora Philip
2011	Ko	"Aga Naga"	Harris Jayaraj	Vijay Prakash, Ranina Reddy, Priya Subramaniam, Solar Sai, Srik, Emcee Jesz
2011	180	"Rules Kidaiyathu"	Sharreth	
2011	Mankatha	"Machi Open the Bottle"	Yuvan Shankar Raja	Mano, Premgi Amaren, Haricharan, Naveen
2011	Venghai	"Orey Oru"	Devi Sri Prasad	Harini
2011	Narthagi	"Poovin Manam"	G. V. Prakash Kumar	Harini
2011	Ilaignan	"Neeya Neeya"	Vidyasagar	
2011	Ayyan	"Kaatrinai Pol Ingu"	Ilaiyaraaja	
2011	Aivar	"Malliga Malliga"	Kavi Periyathambi	
2011	Minsaram	"Velethulu Manitha"	T. Devan	
2011	Kanchana	"Nillu Nillu Nillu Nillu"	S. Thaman	
2012	Thuppakki	"Kutti Puli Koottam"	Harris Jayaraj	Hariharan, Dr. Narayanan, Sathyan, Ranina Reddy
2012	Kollaikaran	"Oorae Sonnanga"	Johan Shevanesh	Rahul Nambiar, Harini
2012	Nanda Nanditha	"Jimke Marina"	Emil Mohammed	Emil Mohammed, Karthik, Harish Raghavendra, Srinivas
2012	Nanda Nanditha	"Salam Namasthey"	Emil Mohammed	Krishna Iyer
2012	Thiruthani	"Raja Raja Chozha"	Perarasu	
2012	Thiruthani	"Vannarapettai"	Perarasu	Krishnaveni Perarasu
2012	Mayilu	"Nammaloda Paattuthan"	Ilaiyaraaja	Karthik
2012	Mayilu	"Kalyanamam"	Ilaiyaraaja	Chinnaponnu, Thiruvudaiyan, Rita
2012	Ajantha	"Kaiyil Oru Keyboardum"	Ilaiyaraaja	
2012	Ajantha	"Poduda Sakkapodu"	Ilaiyaraaja	Shweta Mohan
2012	Puthumugangal Thevai	"En Uyiril"	Twinz Chan	Anup
2013	Endrendrum Punnagai	"Othayilae"	Harris Jayaraj	Abhay Jodhpurkar
2013	Puthagam	"Kondadathaan"	James Vasanthan	Rahul, Sunandan
2013	Mathil Mel Poonai	"Manasa Thirudiya"	Ganesh Raghavendra	
2013	Chennaiyil Oru Naal	"En En Yenum"	Mejo Joseph	
2013	Jannal Oram	"Ennadi Ennadi Oviyame"	Vidyasagar	Vishal
2013	Jannal Oram	"Aasa Vecha Manasula"	Vidyasagar	Haricharan, Priya Himesh, Abhirami, Priyadarshini, Velmurugan
2013	Ivan Veramathiri	"Malayaala Porattala"	C. Sathya	Hyde Karty, Bizmac
2014	Pulivaal	"Netrum Party"	N. R. Raghunanthan	Ranina Reddy
2014	Chandra	"Tasse Otthu"	Gautham Srivatsa	
2014	Thalaivan	"Naan Manmathar"	Vidyasagar	Priyasri
2014	Pattaya Kelappanum Pandiya	"Urula Urulakizhangu"	Aruldev	
2014	Vilaasam	"Silukku Sundariye"	Ravi Raaghav	Priyadharshini, Reshmi
2015	Anegan	"Aathadi Aathadi"	Harris Jayaraj	Bhavatharini, Dhanush, Abhay Jodhpurkar
2015	Kaaval	"Sakka Podu"	G. V. Prakash Kumar	Santosh Hariharan
2015	Puli	"Manidha Manidha"	Devi Sri Prasad	
2015	Pallikoodam Pogamale	"Sangu Chakkaram"	Samson Kottoor	Najim Arshad
2016	Iru Mugan	"Kannai Vittu"	Harris Jayaraj	Srimathumitha, Praveen
2016	Pencil	"Why Machi Why"	G. V. Prakash Kumar	V. Srihari
2016	Uchathula Shiva	"Tharu Maru"	Vidyasagar	Dharani, Karan, JP
2017	Kaatru Veliyidai	"Saarattu Vandiyila"	A. R. Rahman	A. R. Reihana, Nikhita Gandhi
2017	Motta Shiva Ketta Shiva	"Mass ah Rough & Tough"	Amresh Ganesh	Malathy
2018	Sollividava	"Jai Hanumantha"	Jassie Gift	S. P. Balasubrahmanyam
2019	Dev	"Anangae Sinungalama"	Harris Jayaraj	Hariharan, Bharath Sunder, Krish, Arjun Chandy, Christopher Stanley, Sharanya Gopinath
2019	Sathru	"Neram Indha Neram"	Amresh Ganesh	Suchitra
2019	Naan Avalai Sandhitha Pothu	"Raavaa Naanum"	Hitesh Murugavel	
2022	Pottu Vaiththaan (Album Song)	"Pottu Vaiththaan"	Maha	Harini
2022	Mofussil	"Engeyum Neeye (Kokkipodu)"	Aruldev	Vinitha
2023	Vaathi	"Sooriya Paarvaigaley"	G. V. Prakash Kumar	Ravi G
2024	Thiru.Manickam	"Bommakka"	Vishal Chandrashekhar	
2025	Dude	"Nallaru Po"	Sai Abhyankkar	Mohit Chauhan, Sai Abhyankkar
2026	OM	"Veezha Veera"	Sai Abhyankkar	Sai Abhyankkar

=== Kannada discography ===
Year	Film	Song name	Music director
2003	Dhad Dhad	"Spain Deshada"	Madhukar
2003	Excuse Me	"Sorry Sorry"	R. P. Patnaik
2004	Avale Nanna Gelathi	"Style Nodu Shepu Nodu"	Koti
2004	Santhosha	"Kothi Kaili Maanikyave"	Stephen Prayog
2004	Kanchana Ganga	"Aishwarya Aishwarya"	S. A. Rajkumar
2004	Nalla	"Mallige Mallige"	Venkat Narayan
2005	Shastri	"Style Varevaa"	Sadhu Kokila
2005	Shambu	"Boss Boss"	Ramesh Krishna
2005	Yashwanth	"Duddu Yaara Kailiddare"	Mani Sharma
2005	Green Signal	"Green Signal"	Venkat-Narayan
2006	7 O' Clock	"Bhoolokava No No"	M. S. Madhukar
2006	Sirivantha	"Happy Day"	S. R. Rajkumar
2006	Neenello Naanalle	"Something"	V. Manohar
2007	Thayiya Madilu	"Malavalli Malli"	S. A. Rajkumar
2007	Snehana Preethina	"Osi Osi"	V. Harikrishna
2007	Ee Preethi Onthara	"Hodi Hodi"	Shameer
2007	Yuga	"Hrudaya Hrudaya"	Arjun Janya
2007	Gaja	"Du Du Duniya"	V. Harikrishna
2008	Gaalipata	"Aakasha Ishte Yaakideyo"	V. Harikrishna
2008	Nanda Nanditha	"Pacchagili Hene"	Emil
2008	Mast Maja Maadi	"Ota Ota"	P. B. Balaji
2008	Baba	"Yaare Neene"	Arjun
2008	Kaamannana Makkalu	"Kaamanna Makkalu"	Vidyasagar
2008	Kaamannana Makkalu	"Kamannanavare"	Vidyasagar
2008	Arjun	"Taubare Taubare"	V. Harikrishna
2008	Chaitrada Chandrama	"Hey Crazy Boys"	S. Narayan
2008	Navagraha	"Smileo Re"	V. Harikrishna
2009	Junglee	"Junglee Shivalingu"	V. Harikrishna
2009	Rajakumari	"Hey Baddi"	V. Harikrishna
2009	Preethse Preethse	"Kuchchu Kuchchu"	Anoop Seelin
2009	Chamkaisi Chindi Udaysi	"Bejaanaagi"	P. B. Balaji
2009	Mr. Painter	"Thalaku Balaku Thare"	G R Shankar
2009	Raaj the Showman	"Hey Hey Paro"	V. Harikrishna
2009	Prem Kahani	"Hodedavne"	Ilaiyaraaja
2009	Devru	"Hallo Hallo"	Sadhu Kokila
2009	Abhay	"Neene Kane"	V. Harikrishna
2009	Bellary Naga	"Jaagore Jaagore"	L N Shastry
2009	Ajantha	"Kaigalalli"	Ilaiyaraaja
2009	Maleyali Jotheyali	"Yaare Ninna Mummy Daddy"	V. Harikrishna
2009	Raam	"Ley Ley Ammana Magale"	V. Harikrishna
2009	Male Barali Manju Irali	"Yeno Aagide Nanage"	Mano Murthy
2009	Vayuputra	"Rock A Body"	V. Harikrishna
2009	Bhagyada Balegaara	"Bhagyada Balegara"	Ilaiyaraaja
2009	10th Class A Sec	"Bannisalaguvude"	R. N. Abhilash
2009	Gokula	"One By Two Jeevana"	Mano Murthy
2010	Ullasa Utsaha	"Chakori Chakori"	G. V. Prakash Kumar
2010	Preethi Hangama	"Chelu Cheluva"	Raj Kiran
2010	Porki	"Dhaane Dhayya"	V. Harikrishna
2010	Zamana	"Happy Happy"	Karthik Raja
2010	Parole	"Yaako Eno Nanage"	Balaji K Mithran
2010	Prithvi	"Hejjegondu Hejje"	Manikanth Kadri
2010	Aithalakkadi	"Hollywood"	Sadhu Kokila
2010	Suryakaanti	"Jaikara"	Ilaiyaraaja
2010	Bindaas Hudugi	"Kannalli Kannittu"	Yaara Ramesh
2010	Shourya	"Laka Laka"	Sadhu Kokila
2010	Kari Chirathe	"My Name Is"	Sadhu Kokila
2010	Jackie	"Shiva Antha Hoguthidde"	V. Harikrishna
2010	Olave Vismaya	"Salaam Namasthe"	Veer Samarth
2010	Nanjangud Nanjunda	"Eri Mele Eri"	K V Ravichandra
2010	Nirdoshi	"Mohaka Thaare"	AM Neel
2010	Nirdoshi	"Ee Dina"	AM Neel
2010	Nirdoshi	"Kannu Koodide"	AM Neel
2010	Nirdoshi	"Manasu Mididide"	AM Neel
2010	Nannavanu	"Hey Maamu"	Ilaiyaraaja
2010	Hoo	"Nooku Nuggalu"	V. Harikrishna
2011	Prince	"Bengaluralli"	V. Harikrishna
2011	Shravana	"Bhoom Shakalaka"	Karthik Bhoopathi
2011	Ee Sanje	"Bide Bide"	Jai Shiva
2011	Kanteerava	"Bidhri Bidhri"	Chakri
2011	Sihi Muthu (film unreleased)	"Chikalaka"	V. Harikrishna
2011	Veerabahu	"Ding Diga Ding"	V. Harikrishna
2011	Kirataka	"Dubai Thorsu"	V. Manohar
2011	FM (film unreleased)	"FM Radio"	G R Shankar
2011	Hare Rama Hare Krishna	"Hare Rama"	Ilaiyaraaja
2011	Bhadra	"Hey Chinna"	Sri Guru
2011	Bhadra	"Madanaari Baale"	Sri Guru
2011	Mallikarjuna	"Hey Miya"	S. A. Rajkumar
2011	Ishta	"Kolahala"	M Sanjeev
2011	Sanju Weds Geetha	"Nalle Nalle"	Jassie Gift
2011	Achchu Mechchu	"Ninna Mele"	A M Neel
2011	Maduve Mane	"Onde Notake"	Manikanth Kadri
2011	Rama Rama Raghurama	"Rama Rama"	V. Harikrishna
2011	Prema Chandrama	"Ratheyalli"	V. Harikrishna
2011	Yogaraj But	"Sunaka Sunana"	Milind Dharmasena
2011	Bodyguard	"Yaake Guru"	Vinay Chandra
2011	Paramathma	"Yaavanig Gothu"	V. Harikrishna
2011	Only Vishnuvardhana	"Edeyolage Guitaarru"	V. Harikrishna
2011	Gun	"Yenne Yaaru"	Ronnie Raphael
2011	Dhool	"Nanna Neenu Gellalare"	V. Harikrishna
2011	Aata	"Lifealli Gelloke"	Sadhu Kokila
2012	Anna Bond	"Boni Aagada"	V. Harikrishna
2012	Saniha	"Ee Manase"	A M Neel
2012	Narasimha	"Hoy Narasimha"	Hamsalekha
2012	Crazy Loka	"Kabab Mey"	Manikanth Kadri
2012	18th Cross	"Suriyo Suriyo"	Arjun Janya
2012	Tuglak	"Maintain"	Arjun Janya
2012	Toofan	"Shiva Hudugire"	Elvin Joshua
2012	Kiladi Kitty	"Madhura Huchchu"	Jassie Gift
2012	Katariveera Surasundarangi	"Oo La La"	V. Harikrishna
2012	Breaking News	"Muddege Saaru"	Stephen Prayog
2012	Jaanu	"En Samachara Ree"	V. Harikrishna
2012	Manjunatha BA LLB	"Problemmu Bandaga"	Vinay Chandra
2012	Kalaya Tasmai Namaha	"Ondu Eradu Preethiya"	A. M. Neel
2012	Mr. 420	"Shampoo Haakalva"	V. Harikrishna
2012	Drama	"Chendutiya Pakkadali"	V. Harikrishna
2013	Ziddi	"Dav Dav Dav"	Giridhar Diwan
2013	Mandahasa	"Modala"	Veer Samarth
2013	Brindavana	"Hearttalliro"	V. Harikrishna
2013	Soori Gang	"Doddorige"	S. Nagu
2013	Sweety Nanna Jodi	"CD Madi Kodri"	Arjun Janya
2013	Bangari	"Bangarige Preethi Banthe"	A. M. Neel
2013	Charminar	"Cindrella Cindrella"	Hari
2013	Topiwala	"Gala Gala"	V. Harikrishna
2013	Bulbul	"Junior Senior"	V. Harikrishna
2013	Bulbul	"Nille Nille (Reprise)"	V. Harikrishna
2013	Chandra	"Tunturu"	Goutam Srivatsa
2013	Nam Duniya Nam Style	"Sorry Please Thank You"	Shaan Rahman
2013	Nam Duniya Nam Style	"Take It Easy"	Shaan Rahman
2013	Whistle	"Aaru Uruthu"	Joshua Sridhar
2013	Loosegalu	"Govindha"	Vani Harikrishna
2013	Case No. 18/9	"Nodkond Nodkond"	Arjun Janya
2013	Jayammana Maga	"Bell Bottom"	Arjun Janya
2013	Neralu	"90 Hodudre Saaku"	Sriharsha
2013	Appayya	"Saavira Hoogalu Aralali"	S. Narayan
2013	Dilwala	"Kaigondu"	Arjun Janya
2013	Sakkare	"Nanagu Ninagu"	V. Harikrishna
2013	Ambara	"Lovey Thrillingu"	Abhimann Roy
2014	Ajith	"Hani Hani"	Yuvan Shankar Raja
2014	Hara	"Lava Lavike"	Jassie Gift
2014	Preethi Geethi Ityaadi	"Tiruboki Takataka"	Veer Samarth
2014	Love Is Poison	"Kanna Munde"	Sai Kiran
2014	Ee Dil Helide Nee Bekantha	"Dildu Formula"	S. Sridhara
2014	Mr. and Mrs. Ramachari	"Mr & Mrs Ramachari"	V. Harikrishna
2014	Mr. and Mrs. Ramachari	"Yenappa"	V. Harikrishna
2014	Gajakesari	"Siva Siva"	V. Harikrishna
2014	Jasmine 5	"Aunty Yaake"	Sri Harsha M Sanjeev
2014	143	"Ninnane Ninnane"	Jassie Gift
2014	Adyaksha	"Kannigu Kannigu"	Arjun Janya
2014	Super Ranga	"Nanagu Ninagu"	Arjun Janya
2014	Ambareesha	"Asaku Pasaku"	V. Harikrishna
2014	Jai Bajarangabali	"Hrudayada Battery"	V. Harikrishna
2014	Chirayu	"Shobhakka"	G. R. Shankar
2014	Sorry Kane	"Aidu Beralu"	Peter M Joseph
2014	Endendu Ninagagi	"Khayile"	V. Harikrishna
2015	Prema Pallakki	"Why"	Vineeth Raj Menon
2015	Ranna	"Thithli Thithli"	V. Harikrishna
2015	Sapnon Ki Rani	"Patta Patta"	Dharma Vish
2015	Bangalore 560023	"Naaleya Nambu Maga"	Arun Andrews
2015	Krishna Leela	"Krishna Calling"	Sridhar V. Sambhram
2015	Vaastu Prakaara	"Vaastu Prakaara"	V. Harikrishna
2015	Eradondla Mooru	"Rahu Kaldalle"	AM Neel
2015	Patharagitthi	"Huccharigu Hucchu"	Venkat Swamy, Sameer Kulkarni
2015	Goolihatti	"Aaykondu Thinnoru"	Ravi Basrur
2015	Bullet Basya	"Bullet Basya"	Arjun Janya
2015	Vascodigama	"Once More"	Poornachandra Tejaswi
2015	Boxer	"Thale Keduthe"	V. Harikrishna
2015	1st Rank Raju	"Raju Raju"	Kiran Ravindranath
2015	Minchagi Nee Baralu	"Gundige Olage"	V. Harikrishna
2015	Minchagi Nee Baralu	"Kelho Haage"	V. Harikrishna
2015	Cigarette	"Software Hudugi"	Indrasena
2015	Masterpiece	"I Can't Wait Baby"	V. Harikrishna
2016	Supari Surya	"Bangara Bangara"	Sridhar V. Sambhram
2016	Tyson	"Avanyaranthale Gothilla"	Jassie Gift
2016	Ricky	"O Baby"	Arjun Janya
2016	Viraat	"Bombdi Bajaaysu"	V. Harikrishna
2016	Shivalinga	"Do Something"	V. Harikrishna
2016	U the End A	"First Time Heartalli"	Manusri
2016	Preethi Kithabu	"Onde Chandrira"	V. Manohar
2016	Ranatantra	"Ha Naguva Samayya"	Arjun Janya
2016	The Great Story of Sodabuddi	"Ha Naguva Samayya"	M. Karthik
2016	Mangata	"Bang Bang"	Arjun Ramu
2016	Style King	"Style King"	Arjun Janya
2016	Jaggu Dada	"Vaale Jumuki"	V. Harikrishna
2016	Deal Raja	"Deal Raja"	Abhimann Roy
2016	Deal Raja	"Ringswamy"	Abhimann Roy
2016	Crazy Boy	"Naanene Nandene"	Jassie Gift
2016	Lifu Super	"Suduva Suryane"	Judah Sandhy
2016	Doddmane Hudga	"C/o Doddmane"	V. Harikrishna
2016	Santhu Straight Forward	"Anthu Inthu"	V. Harikrishna
2016	Santhu Straight Forward	"Volle Huduga Sikkoune"	V. Harikrishna
2016	Badmaash	"Ishta Ishta Aadre"	Judah Sandhy
2016	Naanu Mattu Varalakshmi	"Na Chennagidde - Reprise"	V. Harikrishna
2018	3 Gante 30 Dina 30 Second	"Bitti Buildup"	Sridhar V. Sambhram
2018	O Premave	"Sa Ri Ga Ma Pa"	Anand Rajavikram-Rahul Dev
2018	Krishna Tulasi	"Lokana Nammange"	Kiran Ravindranath
2018	Raja Loves Radhe	"Sobagu Sobagu"	Veer Samarth
2023	Kranti	"Dont Mess With Him"	V. Harikrishna

=== Telugu discography ===
Year	Film	Song	Composer(s)
2000	Manasunna Maaraju	"Oodala Oodala Marri Chettu"	Vandemataram Srinivas
2001	Nuvvu Naaku Nachav	"Unna Maata Cheppaneevu"	Koti
2001	Student No.1	"Koochipudi Kaina"	M. M. Keeravani
2001	Anandam	"Anandam"	Devi Sri Prasad
2001	Repallelo Radha	"Raave Samajavaragamana"	Koti
2001	Naalo Unna Prema	"Edalo Okate Korika"	Koti
2001	Snehamante Idera	"Snehamante Idera"	Shiva Shankar
2001	Ishtam	"Ee Andala Collegelo"	DG Gopinath
2001	Hanuman Junction	"Golmaal Golmaal"	Suresh Peters
2001	Darling Darling	"Nari Nari"	Koti
2001	Darling Darling	"Titanic"	Koti
2002	Takkari Donga	"Hey Mama"	Mani Sharma
2002	Neetho Cheppalani	"Missu Oh Vachhindhi"	Koti
2002	Seshu	"Aakasam Kindundi"	Yuvan Shankar Raja
2002	Aadi	"Chikki Chikki Bam Bam"	Mani Sharma
2002	Vasu	"Sportive Boys"	Harris Jayaraj
2002	Sontham	"Sontham"	Devi Sri Prasad
2002	Malli Malli Choodali	"Whiskylo"	Yuvan Shankar Raja
2002	Panchatantram (D)	"Ne Pennu Nuvvu Paper"	Deva
2002	Sandade Sandadi	"Auna Auna"	Koti
2003	Simhadri	"Nuvvu Whistleisthe"	M. M. Keeravani
2003	Abhimanyu	"TV Lantidera"	Mani Sharma
2003	Okariki Okaru	"Ghatu Ghatu Prema"	M. M. Keeravani
2003	Aadanthe Ado Type	"Chinnadani Soku"	Yuvan Shankar Raja
2003	Aadanthe Ado Type	"O Friend Nee Kopam"	Yuvan Shankar Raja
2003	Janaki Weds Sriram	"Rivvuna Egire Guvva"	Ghantadi Krishna
2004	Anji	"Manava Manava""	Mani Sharma
2004	Varsham	"Langa Voni"	Devi Sri Prasad
2004	Arya	"Thakadimithom"	Devi Sri Prasad
2004	Abhi	"Katuveya Vachindi"	Devi Sri Prasad
2004	Sri Anjaneyam	"Avvai Tuvvai"	Mani Sharma
2004	Dost	"Jeevitham Oka Aatara"	Koti
2004	Dost	"Sorry Cheppi"	Koti
2004	Gharshana	"Nanne Nanne"	Harris Jayaraj
2004	Nenunnanu	"Ettago Unnadi"	M. M. Keeravani
2004	Nenunnanu	"Ryali Ravulupadu"	M. M. Keeravani
2004	Nenunnanu	"Intha Dooram"	M. M. Keeravani
2004	Sye	"Gutlovundi"	M. M. Keeravani
2004	Mr & Mrs Sailaja Krishnamurthy	"Asale Chalikalam"	M. M. Keeravani
2004	Andaru Dongale Dorikite	"Kannethanam Vannethanam"	Chakri
2004	Donga Dongadi	"Andam Guntaru""	Vidyasagar
2004	Letha Manasulu	"Tholi Tholi Korika"	M. M. Keeravani
2004	Mass	"Kottu Kottu Kottu"	Devi Sri Prasad
2005	Nuvvostanante Nenoddantana	"Something Something"	Devi Sri Prasad
2005	Naa Alludu	"Nadumu Choosthe"	Devi Sri Prasad
2005	Evadi Gola Vaadidhi	"Banthilanti Bhama"	Kamalakar
2005	Evadi Gola Vaadidhi	"Ammo Vadevadogani"	Kamalakar
2005	Keelu Gurram	"Chal Chal Gurram"	S. A. Rajkumar
2005	Manasu Maata Vinadhu	"Enamina Macarina"	Kalyani Malik
2005	Soggadu	"Kokkoroko"	Chakri
2005	Jagapati	"Cheera Kattu Vayasu"	M. M. Keeravani
2005	Jagapati	"Chandamamaki Kaluva"	M. M. Keeravani
2005	Aparichithudu (D)	"Love Elephantla"	Harris Jayaraj
2005	Bunny	"Maro Maro"	Devi Sri Prasad
2005	Athanokkade	"Chitapata Chitapata"	Mani Sharma
2005	Bhadra	"Just Do It"	Devi Sri Prasad
2005	Bhadra	"Ye Oore Chinnadana"	Devi Sri Prasad
2005	Narasimhudu	"Krishnamurariki"	Mani Sharma
2005	Oka Oorilo	"Gudu Gudu Guncham"	Devi Sri Prasad
2005	Allari Bullodu	"Magavada Mathi Poyera"	M. M. Keeravani
2005	Chandramukhi	"Raa Raa Sarasaku"	Vidyasagar
2005	Chatrapathi	"Mannela Tintivira"	M. M. Keeravani
2005	Modati Cinema	"Thaka Chuku"	Swaraj
2005	Ghajini (D)	"Ragola Ola"	Harris Jayaraj
2005	Vennela	"East West"	Mahesh Shankar
2005	Mahanandi	"Tightgunna Jeans Pantu"	Kamalakar
2005	Jalakanta (D)	"Adda Manadira"	Harris Jayaraj
2005	Jalakanta (D)	"Aggilanti Valape"	Harris Jayaraj
2005	That Is Pandu	"Acham Acham"	Mani Sharma
2005	Chinnodu	"Kannullo Merisave"	Ramana Gogula
2006	10th Class	"Maa Oopiri"	K. M. Radha Krishnan
2006	Khatarnak	"Bujjigadu"	B. K. Sumitra
2006	Tata Birla Madhyalo Laila	"Akundi Vakkesi"	M. M. Srilekha
2006	Annavaram	"Jarra Soodu"	Vandemataram Srinivas
2006	Pournami	"Ichi Puchukunte"	Devi Sri Prasad
2006	Astram	"Muddu Muddu"	S. A. Rajkumar
2006	Indian Beauty	"Summer"	Joy Kelvin
2006	Ranam	"Hey Chinna"	Mani Sharma
2006	Tuntari	"Konaseema"	Mani Sharma
2006	Veerabhadra	"Aa Eedukondalu"	Mani Sharma
2006	Andala Ramudu	"Rajadhi Raja"	S. A. Rajkumar
2006	Jagadam	"5 Feet 8 Inches"	Devi Sri Prasad
2006	Jagadam	"Mu Mu Mudante"	Devi Sri Prasad
2007	Chirutha	"Yamaho Yamma"	Mani Sharma
2007	Aata	"Kakinada Kaaja"	Devi Sri Prasad
2007	Seema Sastri	"Ichothane"	Vandemataram Srinivas
2007	Athili Sattibabu LKG	"Nee Pai Manasu"	Sri Krishna
2007	Anumanaspadam	"Rela Rela Rela"	Ilaiyaraaja
2007	Yogi	"Nee Illu Bangaram"	Ramana Gogula
2008	Lakshyam	"Sukku Sukku"	Mani Sharma
2008	Lakshyam	"Sukku Sukku (Remix)"	Mani Sharma
2008	Nee Sukhame Ne Koruthunna	"Monalisa Hihilessa"	Madhavapeddi Suresh
2008	Krishnarjuna	"Yamaranjumeedha"	M. M. Keeravani
2008	Krishnarjuna	"Thruvata Baba"	M. M. Keeravani
2008	Swagatam	"Unnannalu"	R. P. Patnaik
2008	Bhale Dongalu	"Romeo Juliet"	K. M. Radha Krishnan
2008	Bhale Dongalu	"Panchadara Yedarilo"	K. M. Radha Krishnan
2008	Bhale Dongalu	"Chota Chota"	K. M. Radha Krishnan
2008	Mallepuvvu	"Lokam"	Ilaiyaraaja
2008	Mallepuvvu	"Hero Nenochane"	Ilaiyaraaja
2008	Jalsa	"Gallo Telinattunde"	Devi Sri Prasad
2008	Evaraina Epudaina	"Akasamalo"	Mani Sharma
2009	Ajantha (unreleased)	"Chetilo Key Board"	Ilaiyaraaja
2009	Ajantha (unreleased)	"Veyyara Okka Beetu"	Ilaiyaraaja
2009	Pistha	"Mandakini"	Mani Sharma
2009	Bangaru Babu	"Gulabi Puvvu"	M. M. Srilekha
2010	Kathi Kantha Rao	"Kattilantodu"	Mallikarjun
2011	1947: A Love Story (D)	"Meghama"	G. V. Prakash Kumar
2011	Journey (D)	"Govinda Govinda"	C. Sathya
2011	Sri Rama Rajyam	"Kalaya Nijama Vaishnava Maya"	Ilaiyaraaja
2012	Nippu	"Oy Pilla"	Thaman S
2012	Racha	"Dillaku Dillaku"	Mani Sharma
2012	Julayi	"Hey Chakkani Bike Undi"	Devi Sri Prasad
2012	Denikaina Ready	"Panche Kattuko"	Yuvan Shankar Raja
2013	Jagadguru Adi Shankara	"Lakshmi Nrusimha"	Nag Sri Vatsa
2014	Paisa	"Govindaa Govindaa"	Sai Karthik
2014	Jump Jilani	"Lucky Laduki"	Vijay Ebenezer
2015	Dynamite	"Ulacacharu Ullippaya"	Achu Rajamani
2017	Cheliya (D)	"Morethukochindi"	A. R. Rahman
2018	Nannu Dochukunduvate	"Bigg Boss Anthem"	B. Ajaneesh Loknath
2018	Naa... Nuvve	"Hey Hey I Love You" (Male)	Sharreth
2018	Naa... Nuvve	"Right Right Right"	Sharreth
2019	Okate Life	"Ohh Meri Dhimtak Nari"	Amresh Ganesh
2019	1st Rank Raju	"Chalo Re Chalo"	Kiran Ravindranath
2025	Oh Bhama Ayyo Rama	"Ramachandhrude"	Radhan

=== Malayalam/Hindi discography ===
Year	Film	Song name	Music director	Language	Notes
2002	Indra – The Tiger	"Bam Bam Bole"	Mani Sharma	Hindi	Dubbed version of Telugu film Indra
2006	Bada Dosth	"Dosth Dosth"	M. Jayachandran	Malayalam	
2010	Ordinary	"Thechippoo Mantharam"	Vidyasagar	Malayalam	
2014	RajadhiRaja	"Kham Kham"	Karthik Raja	Malayalam	
2014	Cousins	"Kolussu Thenni Thenni"	M. Jayachandran	Malayalam	
2018	Krishnam	"Madthu Madthu"	Hariprasad R	Malayalam	

== Television ==
- My Dear Bootham

== Awards ==
- Awarded the Kalaimamani Award by the Government of Tamil Nadu in 2006.
- In 2010, Tippu won the Karnataka State Film Award for Best Male Playback Singer for the song "Hey Paro" from the film Raaj the Showman composed by V. Harikrishna.
