= Maha Nadigan =

2004 film directed by Sakthi Chidambaram

- Poster
- Directed by: Sakthi Chidambaram
- Written by: Sakthi Chidambaram
- Produced by: Gnana Sundari
- Starring: Sathyaraj; Manoj; Vasu
- Cinematography: C. Sureshdevan
- Edited by: Anil Malnad
- Music by: Deva
- Production company: Sundari Films
- Release date: 3 December 2004
- Running time: 134 minutes
- Country: India
- Language: Tamil
- Budget: ₹1.5 crore

Maha Nadigan (transl. Great Actor) is a 2004 Indian Tamil-language political satire film written and directed by Sakthi Chidambaram starring Sathyaraj, Manoj and P. Vasu.

== Plot ==
Sathya (Sathyaraj), a sharp but cunning and opportunistic junior artiste manages to get a chance to act as a hero in a movie. His popularity increases, as he becomes a superstar. Arivanandham (Vasu), a corrupt politician and the leader of a major political party requests Sathya to contest in the assembly elections, to which Sathya accepts. Arivanandham makes Sathya the Chief Minister candidate. Arivanandham's party receives a brute majority due to Sathya's popularity and wins the assembly elections. Sathya becomes the CM. After becoming the CM, he jails all the ministers including Arivanandham. Sathya orders many raids into the houses of ministers and acts weird. The story then moves to a flashback.

Muthu (Manoj), a diehard fan of Sathya loses his right hand, in a clash between two actors' fans. This leaves a huge impact on Sathya, who learns from this event that how much his fans had been devoted to him, and changes himself. Sathya begins to care for Muthu and the two become close. Some days before Sathya's oath taking ceremony, Arivanandham is plotting to kill Sathya and become the CM himself. Arivanandham plants bombs in the marriage hall of Muthu's wedding. Fortunately, Sathya escapes the blast but Muthu dies. Sathya desires revenge for Arivanandham and decides to put it in good use, as the flashback ends.

The rest of the film Sathya introduces many reforms in the government. During the end, he dismisses all the corrupt ministers and selects many youngsters as ministers. He resigns and names Devika (Mallika), an IAS officer who has done much service as the Chief Minister and walks away, as the film ends.

== Cast ==
- Sathyaraj as Sathya
- Manoj as Muthu
- Vasu as Arivanandam
- Mallika as Devika
- Namitha as Aishwarya
- Mumtaj as Nandini
- Raj Kapoor
- Visu
- Ramesh Khanna
- Gowtham Sundararajan
- T. P. Gajendran
- Sathyan
- Manobala
- Chitra Lakshmanan
- Anu Mohan
- Thideer Kannaiah
- Nellai Siva
- Bayilvan Ranganathan
- Vinu Chakravarthy
- Master Haja Sheriff
- Bava Lakshmanan
- Velmurugan
- Alex
- Manikka Vinayagam
- Kili Ramachandran
- S. J. Surya in a special appearance
- Manivannan in a special appearance
- Vikraman in a special appearance
- K. S. Ravikumar in a special appearance

== Soundtrack ==
Maha Nadigan

Soundtrack album by Deva
- Released: 2004
- Recorded: 2004
- Genre: Feature film soundtrack
- Length: 21:29
- Label: Lucky Audio
- Producer: Deva

Deva chronology
Gajendra (2004)	Maha Nadigan (2004)	Englishkaran (2005)

Soundtrack was composed by Deva and Released on Lucky Audio.

Track-List
No.	Title	Lyrics	Singer(s)	Length
1.	"Alwa Nayagane"	Piraisoodan	Kovai Kamala, Devan, Jayalakshmi	6:16
2.	"Kodambakkam"	Nagore Saleem	Ruthoos	5:20
3.	"Kelappu Kelappu"	Deva Kumar	Malathy Lakshman, Grace Karunas	4:47
4.	"Vayase Vayase"	Pa. Vijay	Harini	5:06
5.	"Maha Nadigan"		Palakkad Sreeram	3:15
Total length:				21:29

== Release and reception ==
The Hindu wrote "After "Ennamma Kannu" Shakti Chidambaram made the viewer take notice of his wit and comic sense again in "Charlie Chaplin." [..] In "Maha Nadigan" the humour is back, though he could have concentrated a little more on the storyline too". Indiaglitz wrote "Sakthi Chidambaram deserves kudos for a bold and honest film. But usually bold films are laced with anger, but Mahanadigan is full of poignant humor." Sify wrote "Maha Nadigan is a profusion of cleavages, mindless humour, reality check on actors turning politicians and is pointless as it tries to infuse whimsical humour with satire. No go!". Chennai Online wrote "As he weaves his way though his racy narration, spicing his script with many interesting anecdotes taken from real life (like the midnight arrest of a former CM), some sparkling one-liners and some home truths, taking pot-shots at the idiosyncracies and survival tactics of industry folks and politicians, Sakthi Chidambaram takes the audience through a hilarious journey that one wouldn’t regret travelling!". Cinesouth wrote "Just as giving tablets buried in sweet Banana, the director has given a important and necessary message to the audience in an humorous way. Sakthi Chithambaram should be appreciated for this technique. This film is a fine mixture of comedy, glamour, sentiments, meaningful dialogues, foot tapping songs, you ask for it, you can get it. All kinds of audience will like this film".

Made on a shoe-string budget, Maganadigan was a hit.
