= Saadhuriyan =

- Directed by: T. J. Kumar
- Starring: Manoj; Kunal; Nandana
- Music by: Deva
- Production company: Lakshmi Raju Pictures
- Release date: 11 November 2005
- Country: India
- Language: Tamil

Saadhuriyan (transl. Clever person) is a 2005 Indian Tamil-language romantic action film written and directed by T. J. Kumar. It features Manoj, Kunal, and Nandana. The score and soundtrack for the film was by Deva.

== Cast ==
- Manoj
- Kunal
- Nandana
- Yugendran

== Production ==
T. J. Kumar, an erstwhile assistant of director K. Subhash, narrated the story of Saadhuriyan to director Bharathiraja, who recommended that his son Manoj was cast in the project. Manoj changed his stage name to Manoj Bharathi for the film, hoping that it would be a more auspicious name for him. Kunal was signed on to play a second lead role, appearing with Manoj again after Varushamellam Vasantham (2002), and a photo session featuring both actors was held in October 2004. Meera Vasudevan was cast as the lead actress, before being replaced by Rathi.

A scene in which Manoj was to put his hand on Nandana took several takes till Nandana put his hand on her by herself.

== Soundtrack ==
The score and soundtrack for the film was by Deva.

- "Anju Vayasula" — Sabesh
- "Kannamma Kannamma" — Tippu, Anuradha Sriram
- "Naalai Enaka" — Jeevarekha
- "Saadhuriyana" — Febi Mani
- "Singamada" — Jayalakshmi, Mahesh Vinayaga Ram
- "Vachan Vachan" — Srikanth Deva, Malathi Lakshman

== Release and reception ==
The film had a theatrical release on 11 November 2005 across Tamil Nadu.

The film's lead pair, Manoj and Nandana, fell in love during the making of the film and later got married in December 2006.
