= Taj Mahal (1999 film) =

- Theatrical release poster
- Directed by: Bharathiraja
- Screenplay by: Mani Ratnam
- Dialogues by: R. Selvaraj
- Story by: Mani Ratnam; R. Selvaraj
- Produced by: Janani Ishwarya
- Starring: Manoj; Riya Sen
- Cinematography: B. Kannan; Madhu Ambat
- Edited by: K. K. Pazhanivel
- Music by: A. R. Rahman
- Production company: Janani Cine Arts
- Release date: 7 November 1999
- Country: India
- Language: Tamil

Taj Mahal (/θɑːdʒ məˈhɑːl/) is a 1999 Indian Tamil-language romantic drama film directed by Bharathiraja. The film stars his son, Manoj, and Riya Sen in their debut as lead actors, with a supporting ensemble cast including Revathi, Radhika, and Ranjitha. The film was written by Mani Ratnam, the music was composed by A. R. Rahman and B. Kannan handled the camera. The story revolves around two clashing communities and two lovers caught in the vortex of their rivalry. The film was released during Diwali in 1999 and fared poorly at the box office.

== Plot ==
Thiruppaachi and Sengulam are neighbouring villages with a history of enmity between them. Maayan and Machakanni meet on the day of her engagement and it is love at first sight. Her marriage is called off when the groom and his family insult Machakanni's family and her romance with Maayan continues. However, when her brother finds out about him, all hell breaks loose. The turned-down bridegroom is still itching for revenge and concludes that the only way to extract it is to marry Machakanni. He pleads for forgiveness and succeeds in melting her brother's heart. The marriage is finalised but Maayan's friends swear to unite the star-crossed lovers. There is also a subplot of Maayan's aunt trying to get her daughter married off to Maayan.

== Cast ==
- Manoj as Maayan
- Riya Sen as Machakanni
- Revathi as Maayan's mother
- Radhika as Maayan's aunt
- Ranjitha as Machakanni's sister in law
- Manivannan
- Manobala
- Raj Kapoor as Machakanni's brother
- Theni Kunjarammal
- Theni K. Murugan
- Balakrishnan
- Minnal Deepa as Machakanni's friend

== Production ==
Bharathiraja introduced his son Manoj as an actor with the film, stating that his son should appear as an actor before fulfilling his dreams of working as a part of the crew. Riya Sen, daughter of Hindi actress Moon Moon Sen was signed on to play the female lead. Leading film-maker Mani Ratnam wrote the story for the film, while Rajiv Menon was also involved in initial script discussions but opted out after the film became a village-centric project. Veteran cinematographers B. Kannan and Madhu Ambat also signed the project, marking their return to Tamil cinema after a long hiatus.

The team started pre-production work in late 1997 and shooting began in 1998, with the project becoming Janani Cine Arts' most expensive production to date. During production, Bharathiraja considered giving his son a stage name of Manibharathi, but ultimately opted against doing so. An exact replica of the Taj Mahal was created on Marina Beach in Chennai for a song sequence. The film was shot across areas including Kulu Manali, Badhami, Hampi, Bellari and Poomparai.

== Soundtrack ==
The soundtrack features 10 songs composed by A. R. Rahman and lyrics by Vairamuthu. The album marked Rahman's fourth collaboration with Bharathiraja. The songs were noted for the extensive use of traditional instruments. Rahman introduced several singers into the Tamil music scene, the most notable being Palakkad Sreeram. He sang a dappankuthu style song "Thirupaachi". Suchitra Lata of The Music Magazine wrote "Rahman's music is aptly bare for the village setting; it has energy and is warmly stylised by an orchestra of the cello, violins and drums."

Track listing
No.	Title	Singer(s)	Length
1.	"Thirupaachi"	Kalpana Raghavendar, Clinton Cerejo, Palakkad Sreeram, Chandran	6:55
2.	"Chotta Chotta" (female)	Sujatha Mohan	5:45
3.	"Adi Manjakelange"	Ganga Sitharasu, Febi Mani, Theni Kunjarammal, Kanchana	2:52
4.	"Kizhakke Nandavanam"	Ganga Sitharasu, Febi Mani, Theni Kunjarammal, Kanchana	2:47
5.	"Eechi Elemichhi"	Manoj Bharathiraja, B. Arundhathi, Raqueeb Alam, Parthasarathy (Veena in first interlude), Naveen (Flute in second interlude)	6:45
6.	"Chotta Chotta" (male)	Srinivas	5:32
7.	"Kulirudhu Kulirudhu"	Unni Krishnan, Swarnalatha, R. Visweswaran (Iranian Santoor in second interlude)	4:44
8.	"Sengaathey (Sengatrae)"	T. K. Kala, Richa Sharma (Punjabi Version 'Rabba Ve' in the background)	4:54
9.	"Eechi Elemichhi"	Krishnaraj, B. Arundhathi, Raqueeb Alam	6:45
10.	"Karisal Tharasil"	M. G. Sreekumar, K. S. Chithra, Srinivas (Humming)	5:54
Total length:			52:53

== Release ==
The film was initially slated to face a box office battle with several other big films, notably Hey Ram, Alai Payuthey, Kandukondain Kandukondain, and Mudhalvan, but the delay of the first three gave Taj Mahal a possible leeway to become a success. Despite this, the film became a box office failure and Manoj's career failed to take off despite a high-profile launch. Journalists attributed the film's failure to the use of artificial sets to depict villages, in contrast to Bharathiraja's penchant for authenticity and realism, while Bharathiraja blamed it on Rahman's music. Irrespective of the film's performance, in 2004 Riya Sen regarded Taj Mahal as showcasing the best role in her career to that point. The film was set to be dubbed and released in Telugu, but the financial losses suffered had deterred the version. Manoj won the Dinakaran Cinema Award for Best Newface Actor.

== Critical reception ==
G. Ulaganathan of The New Indian Express said that Taj Mahal was "vintage Bharatiraja at his best", while also adding that Riya Sen "shines in spite of an alien language and the totally strange cultural milieu in which she is placed". Ulaganathan added that "song picturisation is brilliant and Revathy and Radhika, both favourite ex-heroines of the director, put up an impressive show." He also said the "only eyesore is hero Manoj" and that Bharathiraja "has been a little over-ambitious here and could have edited at least 20% of the film, including many unnecessary action scenes." Aurangazeb of Kalki panned the acting of the lead pair but praised the acting of other actors, Rahman's music, Kannan's cinematography and felt the film lacked the realism of Bharathiraja's previous films and concluded saying this film is not an eternal love, it is a love that chases away. K. N. Vijiyan of New Straits Times wrote, "Though the story may not be new, it should be a treat for young lovers and Bharathiraaja fans". Malathi Rangarajan of The Hindu lauded Kannan's cinematography, Bharathiraja's screenplay and Rahman's music but criticised the story for lacking novelty.
