= Anu Mohan (Tamil actor) =

Indian actor (born 1957)

- Born: David Stanley; 3 December 1957 (age 68); Coimbatore, Madras State (now Tamil Nadu), India
- Occupation: Actor
- Years active: 1987–present

Anu Mohan (born as David Stanley) is an Indian actor and director who has worked in Tamil language films. Beginning his career as a director, Anu Mohan has gone on to play secondary comedy roles in films, notably portraying a character in Padayappa (1999).

== Career ==
Anu Mohan completed his mechanical engineering and started his career in the late 1980s assisting R. Sundarrajan, making his directorial debut with Idhu Oru Thodar Kathai (1987) and went on to make films like Ninaivu Chinnam (1989) and Annan (1999). He appeared in acting roles in the 1990s and notably portrayed a comedy role in K. S. Ravikumar's Padayappa (1999), which garnered him further offers during the period. In the 2000s, he appeared in primarily low budget films portraying a comedian. He was recalled by K. S. Ravikumar to feature in Lingaa (2014).

In 2014, his son, Arun Mohan, made his directorial debut with the thriller film Sarabham, produced by C. V. Kumar.

== Notable filmography ==
=== Director ===
Year	Film	Notes
1987	Idhu Oru Thodar Kathai	
1989	Ninaivu Chinnam	
1994	Mettupatti Mirasu	
1999	Annan	

=== Actor ===
Year	Film	Role	Notes
1982	Archanai Pookal		
1995	Chithirai Thiruvizha	Doctor	
1997	V.I.P	Driver	
1998	Moovendhar	Dharmidasan	
1998	Natpukkaga	Anu	
1999	Mannavaru Chinnavaru	Rajamani's cousin	
1999	Padayappa	Chinnarasu	
1999	Suyamvaram	Detective	
1999	Kannodu Kanbathellam	Seetharam's PA	
1999	Minsara Kanna	Police constable Vijay	
1999	Anbulla Kadhalukku		
1999	Sundari Neeyum Sundaran Naanum	Panneerselvam	
1999	Paattali	Avudaiappan	
2000	Eazhaiyin Sirippil	Bus driver	
2000	Sandhitha Velai		
2000	Simmasanam	Bus driver	
2000	Sabhash		
2000	Kannukku Kannaga	Arun's father	
2001	Badri	Shanmugam	
2001	Sigamani Ramamani	Compounder	
2001	Sonnal Thaan Kaadhala		
2001	Star	Sub-inspector Rathnam	
2001	Azhagana Naatkal		
2002	Kamarasu		
2002	Jaya		
2002	Varushamellam Vasantham		
2002	King		
2002	Shakalaka Baby		
2002	Namma Veetu Kalyanam		
2002	Villain	Emcee	
2003	Ice		
2003	Ottran		
2003	Pavalakkodi	Anu Mohan	
2003	Anbe Un Vasam	College chairman	
2003	Bheeshmar	Constable Munu Munisaamy	
2003	Punnagai Poove		
2003	Sena		
2003	Three Roses		
2004	Super Da		
2004	Maha Nadigan		
2004	Sound Party		
2004	Attahasam	Veterinarian	Uncredited
2005	Iyer IPS	Krishnamoorthy	
2005	Pon Megalai		
2005	Kadhal FM		
2006	Thirupathi	Temple priest	
2006	Kalinga		
2006	Dharmapuri	Villager	
2007	Manase Mounama	Anjaneya	
2007	Kadhalum Katru Mara		
2008	Dindigul Sarathy	House Owner	
2008	Sutta Pazham	Mani	
2008	Thodakkam		
2008	Pazhani	Jagadish	
2008	Silambattam	Lawyer	
2009	Oru Kadhalan Oru Kadhali		
2009	Kudiyarasu		
2009	Unnai Kann Theduthe	Manikkam	
2010	Unakkaga Oru Kavithai		
2010	Pollachi Mappillai		
2010	Siddu +2		
2010	Agam Puram	Police officer	
2011	Vedi		
2011	Konjam Sirippu Konjam Kobam		
2012	Paagan	Subramani's uncle	
2013	Bhuvanakadu	Police officer	
2014	Bramman	Siva's uncle	
2014	Lingaa	Shanmugam	
2014	Endrume Anandham		
2016	Ka Ka Ka Po		
2016	Ilamai Oonjal		
2016	Thodari	Pughazhmannan	
2017	Yevanavan		
2017	Vaigai Express	Railway Officer	
2018	Alai Pesi		
2018	Kilambitaangayaa Kilambitaangayaa		
2021	Pei Mama		
2025	Otha Votu Muthaiya	Personal income tax	
2025	Konjam Kadhal Konjam Modhal	Sarassu's husband	
2026	Red Label		

=== Dubbing artist ===
Year	Film	Actor	Notes
1995	Rangeela	Avtar Gill	Tamil version only
1995	Rowdy Boss	Chalapathi Rao	Tamil version only
1996	Siraichaalai	Sreenivasan	Tamil version only
1996	Delhi Diary	Rajan P. Dev	Tamil version only
1998	Unmai	Janardhanan	Tamil version only
1998	Harikrishnans	Innocent	Tamil version only
1999	Shanmuga Pandiyan	Brahmanandam	Dubbed for Tamil version only
1999	Crime File	Rajan P. Dev	Tamil version only
1999	Bharata Ratna	Kota Srinivasa Rao	Tamil version only
2003	Kalam	Jagadeesh	
2006	Chennai Kadhal	Dharmavarapu Subramanyam	

=== Writer ===
- Pangali (1992)
- Thai Maaman (1994)

== Television ==
Year	Title	Role	Channel
1997	Sundaravanam		Sun TV
2000	Gokulam Veedu		Sun TV
2005	Krishna Cottage		Jaya TV
2017–2018	Nandini	Neelakanthan	Sun TV
2021	Start Music	Contestant	Star Vijay
2021	Jothi	Rangan	Sun TV
2022	Kana Kaanum Kaalangal	Social Teacher	Disney+Hotstar
2026-present	Palayathu Amman		Jaya TV
