= Mettupatti Mirasu =

- Poster
- Directed by: Anu Mohan
- Written by: Anu Mohan
- Produced by: Bharathi Appusamy
- Starring: Sivakumar; Arjun; Radhika; Suman Ranganathan
- Cinematography: Rajarajan
- Edited by: Srinivas Krishna
- Music by: M. S. Sriraj
- Production company: Sharmila Movies
- Release date: 15 July 1994
- Running time: 150 minutes
- Country: India
- Language: Tamil

Mettupatti Mirasu (transl. Landlord of Mettupatti) is a 1994 Indian Tamil-language drama film written and directed by Anu Mohan. The film stars Sivakumar, Arjun, Radhika and Suman Ranganathan, with Goundamani, Senthil, S. S. Chandran, Sangeeta and Sathyapriya playing supporting roles. The film was shot and completed in 1991. It was later released on 15 July 1994.

== Plot ==
Pazhanisamy, also known as Mettupatti Mirasu, is a rich and respected village elder, he is married to the arrogant Deivanai. They have a son, Siva, and a niece, Radha. Siva is going to marry the village belle Meenakshi, who is from another village. The day of the wedding, the bus in which Meenakshi and her family are travelling is stopped by thieves. Chinnadurai rescues them and saves the passengers. Afterwards, Siva and Meenakshi marry in time as planned.

Karmegam is Pazhanisamy's accountant for many years, he has an eye on Pazhanisamy's wealth. He wants his son to marry Pazhanisamy's niece Radha.

Chinnadurai is the newly appointed physical education teacher at the village's school. He lives with his widow mother and the villagers make fun of his late mentally ill father. Thereafter, Chinnadurai and Radha fall in love with each other. When Siva learns of their love affair, he wants to arrange Radha's marriage as soon as possible with a man with equal prestige. Pazhanisamy calms his son and he promises to find a better solution at his Shashthipurti ceremony: that Pazhanisamy will have to marry his wife Deivanai a second time. The day of the ceremony, Siva sends henchmen to beat up Chinnadurai. Chinnadurai fights the henchmen and stops the Shashthipurti ceremony. To everyone's complete surprise, Pazhanisamy ties the mangala sutra around Valliammai's neck (synonym of marriage).

In the past, Valliammai worked as a maid in Pazhanisamy's home, she was still unmarried. One day, Deivanai left the home with her son Siva for a ceremony in the neighbouring village but they stayed there for more than a week. In the meantime, Pazhanisamy becomes sick, and Valliammai stayed with him, they had intercourse. A few weeks later, Valliammai became pregnant. When villages elders asked about the father's identity, she showed a mentally ill man to save Pazhanisamy's prestige.

Thereafter, Siva turns against his father Pazhanisamy under the guidance of the stingy Karmegam. Pazhanisamy then passes away, before his death Meenakshi promises him to solve the feud between Siva and Chinnadurai. What transpires next forms the rest of the story.

== Cast ==
- Sivakumar as Pazhanisamy (Mettupatti Mirasu) and Siva
- Arjun as Chinnadurai
- S. S. Chandran as Karmegam
- Radhika as Meenakshi
- Suman Ranganathan as Radha
- Goundamani as Gounder
- Senthil
- Sangeeta as Valliammai, Durai's mother
- Sathyapriya as Deivanai
- Vichu Viswanath
- Kovai Senthil
- Krishnamoorthy
- Manager Subramaniam
- M. R. Sulakshana
- Madurai Jayanthi

== Soundtrack ==
The soundtrack was composed by M. S. Sriraj, with lyrics written by Pulamaipithan, Kamakodiyan, Piraisoodan, Muthurasan and Komagan.

Song	Singer(s)	Duration
"Mangalam Mangalamae"	K. J. Yesudas, K. S. Chithra, Uma Ramanan	4:35
"Raagam Engae"	S. P. Balasubrahmanyam	4:41
"Chinna Chinna"	S. P. Balasubrahmanyam, S. P. Sailaja	4:30
"Thottathunalae"	S. P. Balasubrahmanyam, S. P. Sailaja	4:49

== Reception ==
Malini Mannath of The Indian Express described the film as "cliched but enjoyable". K. Vijiyan of New Straits Times said the film was only "midly satisfying", and was critical of the cinematography.
