= Idhu Oru Thodar Kathai =

- Poster
- Directed by: Anu Mohan
- Story by: R. Sundarrajan
- Produced by: V. Devarajan; K. Ganeshan
- Starring: Mohan; Amala; Rekha
- Cinematography: Rajarajan
- Edited by: R. Bhaskaran
- Music by: Gangai Amaran
- Production company: Royal India Creations
- Release date: 11 April 1987
- Country: India
- Language: Tamil

Idhu Oru Thodar Kathai (transl. This is a never ending story) is a 1987 Indian Tamil-language film directed by Anu Mohan in his debut. The film stars Mohan, Amala and Rekha. It was released on 11 April 1987.

== Cast ==
- Mohan as Ravi
- Amala as Sumathi
- Rekha as Radha
- Goundamani
- Senthil
- V. Gopalakrishnan
- Ra. Sankaran
- G. Srinivasan
- Kumarimuthu
- Ramnath
- Joker Thulasi
- Jai Seetharaman
- Sukumari
- Kamala Kamesh
- Vijayachandrika

== Production ==
Anu Mohan, an erstwhile assistant of R. Sundarrajan, made his directorial debut with this film. Sundarrajan also wrote the story and dialogues for the film.

== Soundtrack ==
Soundtrack was composed by Gangai Amaran who also wrote the lyrics.

Track listing
| No. | Title | Singer(s) | Length |
|---|---|---|---|
| 1. | "Paadal Naan Paada" | S. P. Balasubrahmanyam |
| 2. | "Hey Vennila" | S. P. Balasubrahmanyam, S. Janaki |
| 3. | "Engum Idhayam" | S. P. Balasubrahmanyam, S. Janaki |
| 4. | "Site Adicha" | Malaysia Vasudevan |
| 5. | "Pillaikoru" | K. S. Chithra |

== Release and reception ==
Idhu Oru Thodar Kathai was released on 11 April 1987. The Indian Express wrote, "Film is a world apart. Money is needed to translate ideas on to celluloid, and again, lucre is a dominating, if not the only preoccupation of most of the people who matter in films. So much so, creativity and close-to-life ideas tend to be crushed under the iron feet of the worshippers of Mammon. That's exactly why a film like Idhu Oru Thodarkadhai makes you happy."
