= Kusthi =

- Directed by: Raj Kapoor
- Written by: Raj Kapoor
- Produced by: M. Gnanasundari
- Starring: Prabhu; Karthik; Vadivelu; Manya; Flora; Vijayakumar; Radha Ravi
- Cinematography: B. Balamurugan
- Edited by: G. B. Venkatesh
- Music by: D. Imman
- Production company: Sundari Films
- Release date: 23 June 2006
- Running time: 151 minutes
- Country: India
- Language: Tamil

Kusthi is a 2006 Indian Tamil-language comedy film directed by Raj Kapoor, starring Prabhu and Karthik, while Vadivelu, Manya, Flora, Vijayakumar and Radha Ravi play supporting roles. The music is composed by D. Imman. The film released on 23 June 2006 and was an average hit at the box office.

== Plot ==
The movie begins with Jeeva (Prabhu), running away from his village to Chennai fearing a possible marriage with the daughter of a local chieftain (Radha Ravi), arranged by his father. He joins his old-friend Velu (Vadivelu), who runs an eatery in the city. Meanwhile, he saves a youth (Mahanadi Shankar), a henchman of a local goon Singam (Karthik) from some gangsters. Thus he gets the acquaintance of Singam. Meanwhile, Singam come across Abi (Flora), a research scholar and Jeeva meets Divya (Manya). Both fall in love with them. Enters another goon (Raj Kapoor), who leaves his stolen money with Singam. He runs behind Singam to get the money back.

Meanwhile, Radharavi and his men come down to Chennai in search of Jeeva. Following a mishap, Jeeva admits Singam and an old woman Lakshmi (Latha) in a hospital. Mistaking Jeeva to be their missing grandson, father of Latha (Vijayakumar) and his relatives take him to Kodaikanal. Fearing the Nattamai, Jeeva decides to go to Kodaikanal and acts as their grandson.

Comes Singam with a plan to murder Vijayakumar. However he manages to win the heart of the family members and they arrange for Jeeva and Singam's wedding with Vijayakumar's grand daughters Abi and Divya. Raj Kapoor and Radharavi enter the scene and all confusion begins. The rest is all but how both Jeeva and Singam succeed in walking away with Abi and Divya.

== Cast ==
- Prabhu as Jeeva
- Karthik as Singam
- Vadivelu as Velu
- Manya as Divya
- Flora as Abi
- Vijayakumar as Abi & Divya's grandfather
- Radha Ravi as Aruval Rathnam Nattamai Chieftain
- Y. G. Mahendran as Vayram
- Ilavarasu as Abi's father
- Raj Kapoor
- Chitra Lakshmanan
- Manobala
- T. P. Gajendran
- Madhan Bob
- Chitti Babu
- Balu Anand
- Latha
- Sabitha Anand
- Aarthi as Sulukku Sundari
- Vijayan
- Besant Ravi
- Mahanadi Shankar
- Thalapathi Dinesh
- Crane Manohar
- R. S. Shivaji
- Scissor Manohar
- Kovai Senthil

== Soundtrack ==
Kusthi

Soundtrack album by D. Imman
- Released: 2006
- Genre: Feature film soundtrack
- Language: Tamil

D. Imman chronology
Kalinga (2006)	Kusthi (2006)	Vathiyar (2006)

All music is composed by D. Imman

Track listing
No.	Title	Lyrics	Singer(s)	Length
1.	"Kalavani Kalavanipayale"	Raj Kapoor	Anuradha Sriram, D. Imman	04:01
2.	"Kokkarakko"	Palani Bharathi	Karthik	04:23
3.	"Masala Maharani"	P. Vijay	Priyadarshini, Ranjith	04:17
4.	"Roottu Pudichom"	P. Vijay	Tippu, Srinivas	04:13
5.	"Thakadheem"	Snehan	Harish Raghavendra, D. Imman, Lavanya	04:35
Total length:				21:29

== Critical reception ==
S. Sudha of Rediff.com opined that "Coming from a director of B grade films and with out-of-work actors, the film is surprisingly refreshing. A bit of trimming would have helped to quicken the pace, though". Sify wrote "The weakest link in Kusthi is its story which has been ripped off a Malayalam film in the first half and a Telugu film in the latter half! It is nothing but a mish-mash of mistaken identities, slapstick comedy, a bit of glamour, a comic villain, loving grandfather, mother sentiments and lots of crass jokes". Malathi Rangarajan of The Hindu wrote "Comparisons are odious all right, but even as you watch `Gusthi,' you cannot but think of the imposing parts Prabhu and Karthik portrayed together in `Agni Nakshatram' and heave a sigh of sadness at their present plight ... and yours too. Because the screenplay wipes out chances of what could have been a fairly enjoyable fare". Indiaglitz wrote ""The movie unfortunately lacks coherence. Almost all the characters speak lengthy dialogues. Imman's music is a big letdown. Had the movie been released almost an year ago, it could have made some difference". Cinesouth wrote one can appreciate Raj Kapoor for making a comedy film in the midst of action films. Malini Mannath of Chennai Online wrote "It has a huge star cast, playing characters with various hues who bungle through the story, leading to goof-ups and mix-ups. It may not be the best of comedies, but at least it doesn't bore you, and it keeps the pace moving, generating laughs now and then".
