= Sri (2002 film) =

2002 film by Pushpavasagan

- Poster
- Directed by: Pushpavasagan
- Screenplay by: Pushpavasagan
- Story by: Pushpavasagan; Rajmathi
- Produced by: V. Sumankumar
- Starring: Suriya; Shrutika; Gayatri Jayaraman
- Cinematography: S. R. Ganesan
- Edited by: Vinod
- Music by: T. S. Muralidharan
- Production company: Venkateswaralayam
- Release date: 20 July 2002
- Running time: 148 minutes
- Country: India
- Language: Tamil

Sri is a 2002 Indian Tamil-language action drama film co-written and directed by Pushpavasagan (in his directorial debut). The film stars Suriya in the titular role alongside Shrutika (in her acting debut) and Gayatri Jayaraman.

== Plot ==
Sri is a mercenary, longing for his father Sankara Iyer's love. He has been ostracised from his family because his father felt he had a hand in the death of his younger sister, and for refusing to stay silent about it. He is still in love with Meenakshi from his old "Agraharam" and she in love with him, but their union is derided by Sankara Iyer.

== Cast ==
- Suriya as Sri
- Shrutika as Meenakshi
- Gayatri Jayaraman as Stella
- Vijayakumar as Sankara Iyer
- Srividya as Shree's mother
- Vadivelu as "Maruvesham" Marimuthu
- Thalaivasal Vijay as Sri's henchman
- Sriman as Sivakumar
- Riyaz Khan as Velayudham
- Mahanadi Shankar as Santhanam
- Kavithalaya Krishnan as Sri’s uncle
- Ilavarasu as Pasupathy
- Sashikumar Subramani as Sasi
- Kumaresan as Government employee
- Vincent Roy as Police inspector
- Sundaramoorthy as District collector
- Sonia as Velayudham's wife
- Tinky as Gayathri
- Jawahar as Siva
- Kalyani as Meenakshi's friend
- Ramki as Ganesh
- Singamuthu
- Halwa Vasu
- Chelladurai as Prabha Wine Shop owner
- Nesan Napolean as Rowdy
- Sregajesh as Rowdy
- Cool Suresh as Rowdy
- Vijay Ganesh as Police constable
- Citizen Mani as Auto rickshaw driver
- Minnal Deepa as Woman in nightclub
- S. Ramana Girivasan
- S. S. Rajendran as Judge (guest appearance)
- Vennira Aadai Moorthy as Police inspector (guest appearance)
- Thyagu as Head constable (guest appearance)
- Peeli Sivam as Advocate Thyagarajan (guest appearance)
- Alphonsa in a special appearance

== Production ==
The film marked the directorial debut of Pushpavasagan, who earlier assisted R. V. Udayakumar and also directed ad films and music videos. It is the acting debut of Shrutika, the granddaughter of actor Thengai Srinivasan. The first schedule was filmed in Chennai and the remaining filming was done at Pollachi and Gobichettipalayam.

== Music ==
The soundtrack was composed by T. S. Muralidharan. It is the film debut of Muralidharan, who previously worked with Pushpavasagan on the album Pathinaru Vayathinile (2001), where Pushpavasagann directed some music videos. R. V. Udayakumar wrote lyrics for some of the songs.

Track listing
No.	Title	Lyrics	Singer(s)	Length
1.	"Yaamirukka Bayamein"	Pushpavasagan	Vikram, Shankar Mahadevan, Tippu	05:18
2.	"Karthigai Thirunaal"	Jayapal	Bhavatharini	02:35
3.	"Kannae Mozhi Vendam"	Pushpavasagan	Tippu	03:48
4.	"Kala Kalavena"	R. V. Udayakumar	S. P. Balasubrahmanyam	01:36
5.	"Vasantha Sena"	R. V. Udayakumar	Harish Raghavendra, K. S. Chithra	06:01
6.	"Madurai Jilla"	Pushpavasagan	Karunas, A. R. Reihana	03:34
7.	"Anjala"	Vaali	Yugendran, Vasundhara Das, Timmy, Sriram, Ganga	05:21

== Release and reception ==
Malathi Rangarajan of The Hindu opined that "The story could have been powerful and the screenplay appealing if the characters were logical in their actions and the flow had not been hampered by repulsive group dances and irrelevant sequences". Malini Mannath of Chennai Online wrote, "'Sri' looks like an extension of ‘Nandha' with a slight change in ambience. It’s like they had gone and shot a few more scenes for the earlier film!". Cinema Today wrote, "With the story itself hanging by a weak thread, its no surprise that the screenplay and characters are just drifting in and out. Poor Fans! They have only Surya's involvement with the story and the film to console themselves with". Sify wrote, "The `rowdy` genre, which seems to be hot among film makers and actors now is once again tested here by director Pushpagavasan. However, he seems to have been influenced by films of the same genre like the Mohanlal classic Kireedam and the recent Tamizh. The only saving grace of the film is the steel strong performance of Surya as Sri, the ‘dada’ with a golden heart".

Sri was a commercial failure, and Shrutika mentioned that she lacked someone to guide her in acting. It also remains director Pushpavasagan's only release. In 2006, he briefly worked on a project titled Uthama Puthran with Vikranth, but the film was stalled.
