= Annakkodi =

2013 Indian film by Bharathiraja

- Theatrical release poster
- Directed by: Bharathirajaa
- Written by: Bharathirajaa
- Produced by: Chandraleela Bharathiraja; Manoj Bharathiraja; Janani Rajkumar
- Starring: Lakshman Narayan; Karthika Nair; Manoj Bharathiraja
- Cinematography: Saalai Sahaadevan
- Edited by: K. Pazhanivel
- Music by: G. V. Prakash Kumar
- Production company: Manoj Creations
- Release date: 28 June 2013
- Country: India
- Language: Tamil

Annakkodi is a 2013 Indian Tamil-language film directed and written by Bharathirajaa. The film stars Lakshman Narayan, Karthika Nair as the title character and Manoj Bharathiraja. It has music composed by G. V. Prakash Kumar. The film, which began production in 2011, was released on 28 June 2013.

== Plot ==
Goatherd Kodiveeran falls in love with Annakkodi, a village belle. Their romance faces opposition from Sadayan, the village moneylender's son, who also desires Annakkodi. As love blossoms between Kodiveeran and Annakkodi, societal pressures and caste differences lead to Kodiveeran's imprisonment and Annakkodi's forced marriage to Sadayan after her mother's death.

== Cast ==
- Lakshman Narayan as Kodiveeran
- Manoj Bharathiraja as Sadayan
- Karthika Nair as Annakodi
- Manoj Kumar as Sanguni
- Meenal as Narthanga
- Ramaprabha as Annakodi's mother
- Subiksha as Kodiveeran's wife
- Vairamala
- Priyanka
- Dhanusha

== Production ==
The film was initially announced under the title Annakkodiyum Kodiveeranum (transl. Annakkodi and Kodiveeran), which was shortened to Annakkodi as production progressed. R. Parthiban was signed on to play dual roles of father and son and even completed a photoshoot for the film. Karthika Nair was announced as the leading female role of Annakkodi, more than two decades after Bharathiraja had cast her mother Radha in her debut film. Iniya was also cast in a major role. However, the day before principal photography began, Parthiban was replaced by Ameer Sultan to portray the title roles, and admitted he was left in the dark about the decision.

When the Mullaperiyar Dam issue precipitated, Bharathiraja suspended production and sent his Kerala-born heroines home until the issue had died down. The film ran into further trouble when the tussle between the producers and the Film Employees Federation of South India (FEFSI) created disputes between the lead actor and director. Ameer made remarks against the producers' council and backed the FEFSI, and was replaced by Bharathiraja's son Manoj. Iniya was also reported to have left the project due to the delay, but she denied such claims. However, her role was eventually not incorporated in the film.

== Soundtrack ==
The soundtrack was composed by G. V. Prakash Kumar. The audio launch was held on 20 January 2013 at Railway Grounds, Madurai.

Track listing
No.	Title	Lyrics	Singer(s)	Length
1.	"Aavarangaatukulla"	Vairamuthu	Sathya Prakash, Chinmayi	4:37
2.	"Pothi Vecha"	Arivumathi	G. V. Prakash Kumar, Prashanthini	5:28
3.	"Nariga Uranga"	Vairamuthu	Santhosh, Pooja, Harini Sudhakar	5:53
4.	"Poraale"	Gangai Amaran	S. P. B. Charan, M. M. Manasi	6:19
5.	"Annamae"	Egadesi	G. V. Prakash Kumar, Pooja Vaidyanath	4:34
6.	"Kola Vaala Edungada"	Egadesi	Palakkad Sreeram, A. R. Reihana, Maya	3:14
Total length:				30:05

== Critical reception ==
S. Saraswathi of Rediff.com rated the film two out of five stars and wrote the film "lacks depth and fails to ignite the passion needed for such an emotionally compelling story". M. Suganth from The Times of India gave the same rating and wrote, "It is always difficult to watch a great director in decline and the first response that 'Annakkodi', Bharathirajaa’s return to a genre that he made his own (the village movie), evokes is one of disappointment". Malini Mannath of The New Indian Express wrote, "Long and dreary, and testing one's patience at times, it's a disappointing fare from the ace director". Vivek Ramz of In.com wrote, "Overall, Annakodi is typical Bharathiraja style village story but it lacks the intensity and soul seen in the director's earlier ones".

Baradwaj Rangan wrote for The Hindu, "This material, stuffed with class and caste politics, is perfect for melodrama, with juicy twists and turns at every point. But, here, there's no emotional core. The leads strike no sparks together – they could be siblings...and the drama doesn't explode. A strange kind of listlessness settles over the proceedings, and we see a lot of things happening without being affected by any of it." IANS wrote, "It treads a path most village flicks have done in the past. That people in villages are still doomed by caste and creed, and love is something they don't see with a fresh pair of eyes. We can't disagree but neither can we appreciate it because we have been fed similar stories for decades now".
