= Nandana (actress) =

Indian actress (born 1985)

- Born: 17 January 1985 (age 41)
- Occupation: Film actor
- Years active: 2002–2006
- Spouse: Manoj Bharathiraja (m. 2006; died 2025)
- Children: 2
- Relatives: Bharathiraja (Father-in-law)

Ashwati Manoj, known as Nandhana (born 1985), is an Indian former actress who played lead and supporting roles during the 2000s in Malayalam and Tamil films. She made her cinematic debut with the Malayalam movie Snehithan in 2002.

== Career ==
In 2002, Nandana made her debut with the multi-starrer Snehithan alongside Kunchacko Boban, Krishna and Preetha. Regarding her performance a critic wrote, that her performance was "just ok". In 2003, she made her Tamil debut with the film Success co-starring Dushyanth Ramkumar, the grandson of Sivaji Ganesan. Critics noted that her performance was "impressive" and that she "has a very photogenic face and the expressions to go with it". Regarding her performance in the film ABCD (2005), critics noted that she "is good and the girl shows promise", "fiery" and that she fits well into her role. Regarding her performance in her final film Kalinga (2006), a critic wrote that she "is just about adequate, the character doesn't make much of an impact despite the director trying to add weight to it by giving it an unwanted flashback, the tragic past of a Sri Lankan refugee and her aspiration to become a doctor" whilst another critic wrote that to watch her "dance duets is a terrible headache". Her final film was the unreleased Joker.

After retiring from acting, she has since appeared in an ad for the Coimbatore-based Shree Devi Textile.

== Personal life ==
A native of Kozhikode, she married actor Manoj Bharathiraja, son of Tamil director Bharathiraja, on 19 November 2006. He was her co-star in the film Saadhuriyan. Although she only married Manoj in 2006, she was credited as Nandana Kumar in ABCD in 2005. She retired from the film industry after marriage. They have two daughters, Arthika and Mathivadani. Her husband died of a heart attack on 25 March 2025.

== Filmography ==
Year	Film	Role	Language	Notes
2002	Snehithan	Malavika	Malayalam	Debut film
2003	Swapnam Kondu Thulabharam	Kalyani	Malayalam	
2003	Success	Maha	Tamil	
2004	Sethurama Iyer CBI	Reshmi	Malayalam	
2004	Chathikkatha Chanthu	Vandana	Malayalam	
2005	Kalyana Kurimanam	Kaveri	Malayalam	
2005	ABCD	Bharathi	Tamil	credited as Nandana Kumar
2005	Saadhuriyan		Tamil	
2006	Kalinga	Jyothi	Tamil	
