= Snehithan =

- DVD cover
- Directed by: Jose Thomas
- Written by: Udayakrishna-Siby K. Thomas
- Produced by: Salim Sathar
- Starring: Kunchacko Boban; Nandana; Krishna; Preetha Vijayakumar
- Cinematography: Saloo George
- Edited by: Raja Muhammed
- Music by: Mohan Sithara
- Release date: 27 December 2002
- Country: India
- Language: Malayalam

Snehithan (transl. Friend) is a 2002 Indian Malayalam-language romantic comedy film directed by Jose Thomas starring Kunchacko Boban, Nandana, Krishna and Preetha Vijayakumar. This was the last film of N. F. Varghese and Preetha Vijayakumar as the former died and the latter retired from acting after marriage.

== Plot ==
The story begins in a register office where Malavika waits for her lover Anand to come and register their marriage. She is accompanied by photographer Joji, who is her friend's brother to cover the function. But when Anand does not turn up Malavika is forced to go with Joji. Taking sympathy on her, Joji helps her to get a hotel room, which leads to more trouble for them. Cops arrest them during a raid in the hotel and Joji's girlfriend Anu learns of this. To make things worse Joji lies to the police that Malavika is his wife and they are let free. Malavika's parents learn of their daughter's secret marriage and take the couple home, creating another twist in the tale.

Malavika's family gets impressed by Joji except her cousin Vivekan (who wants to marry her) and his father. They try various methods to oust Joji but everything fails. In parallel, Anu's marriage is fixed with Anand. At last, on confronting Anand, he reveals that, on the day of his register marriage with Malavika, he was arrested by the police in a case of mistaken identity. But the time he is released, he gets to know that she was married, another misunderstanding.

In the end, Joji and Anu unite and so does Malavika and Anand.

== Cast ==
- Kunchacko Boban as Joji/Hari
- Nandana as Malavika
- Krishna as Anand Xavier
- Preetha Vijayakumar as Ann Mary aka Anu
- N. F. Varghese as Padhmanabhan, Malavika's father
- Cochin Haneefa as SI Sudarshan
- Prem Kumar as Vivekan
- Sukumari as Malavika's grandmother
- Janardhanan as Vivekan's father
- Innocent as D.Devasia/Devaranyan Namboothiri, Joji's father
- Sreehari as Malavika's Uncle
- Indrans as Rocky
- Valsala Menon as Malavika's aunt
- Ambika Mohan as Malavika's mother
- Subair as Anu's father
- Deepika Mohan

== Soundtrack ==
The film's soundtrack contains eight songs, all composed by Mohan Sithara, with lyrics by Yusufali Kecheri.

#	Title	Singer(s)
1	"Daivam Thanna (M)"	K. J. Yesudas
2	"Daivam Thanna (F)"	Asha G. Menon
3	"Karimizhiyale"	Sujatha Mohan
4	"Makara Nilaavil"	K. J. Yesudas
5	"Omane Paadu Nee"	P. Jayachandran
6	"Premamadhu"	K. J. Yesudas
7	"Premamadhu" (F)	Sujatha Mohan
8	"Velutha Penninte"	K. J. Yesudas

== Reception ==
A critic from Sify wrote that "There is nothing new in the film. Boban as Jijo is charming, while Krishna, Preetha Vijayakumar and the new girl Nandana are just ok".
