= Manoj Bharathiraja =

Indian actor (1976–2025)

- Born: Manoj Kumar Bharathiraja; 11 September 1976; Kambam, Theni district, Tamil Nadu, India
- Died: 25 March 2025 (aged 48); Chennai, Tamil Nadu, India
- Occupations: Actor; director; producer; playback singer
- Years active: 1999–2005; 2013–2024
- Spouse: Nandana (m. 2006)
- Children: 2
- Parent(s): Bharathiraja; Chandraleela

Manoj Kumar Bharathiraja (11 September 1976 – 25 March 2025) was an Indian actor, film director, producer and playback singer who worked in Tamil cinema. He was the son of director Bharathiraja and made his acting debut with his father's Taj Mahal in 1999.

Manoj's notable films included Samudhiram (2001), Kadal Pookkal (2001), Alli Arjuna (2002), Varushamellam Vasantham (2002), Eera Nilam (2003), Annakodi (2013), Baby (2015), Maanaadu (2021) and Viruman (2022).

Before becoming an actor in the Tamil film industry, Manoj worked as an assistant director. He worked as an assistant to his father in films such Nadodi Thendral (1992) and Kizhakku Cheemayile (1993), to Mani Ratnam in Bombay (1995) and to S. Shankar for Enthiran (2010).

== Early life and career ==
Manoj Kumar was born to director Bharathiraja on 11 September 1976 in Theni, Tamil Nadu, India. While aged 8 in school, Manoj learned to play the keyboard and eventually went on to learn guitar and percussion instruments. He had a music troupe called Black Snow. Before becoming an actor in the Tamil film industry, he quit twelfth grade halfway and worked as an assistant director to his father in Kodi Parakkuthu (1988), Nadodi Thendral (1992), Kizhakku Cheemayile (1993) and Tamizh Selvan (1996) and for noted filmmaker Mani Ratnam in Bombay (1995). He studied theatre arts at the University of South Florida.

He made his acting debut in his father's 1999 Tamil film Taj Mahal, playing the lead alongside Riya Sen, who was making her debut as well. Bharathiraja wanted to rename his son as Manibharathi for the film but after Manoj's refusal, his original name was retained. While shooting for Taj Mahal, Manoj encountered two incidents: for a scene, he had to go thirty feet deep in the water and come out but his foot got stuck due to the underwater brush and was promptly saved by an assistant director after the cameraman noticed him, and while filming a sequence involving horseback riding, Manoj fell off and injured his spine. A. R. Rahman gave him the opportunity to sing one of the versions of "Eechi Elumichi" in the film after hearing his work as a playback singer in the yet-to-be released album Pathinaru Vayathinile, which was named after his father's film of the same name. The film became a box office failure, although the soundtrack and background score of the film composed by Rahman was well received by critics as well as audience.

Subsequently in 2001, Manoj appeared in films such as Samuthiram, alongside Sarathkumar and Murali and in Kadal Pookkal, directed by his father, sharing screen space with Murali once again. The latter became a box office failure, But received much critical acclaim for which Bharathiraja was awarded the National Film Award for Best Screenplay. He worked on the album Pathinaru Vayathinile as a playback singer alongside Meena. He then enacted the lead role in Saran's Alli Arjuna (2002), alongside Richa Pallod, before starring in the low budget productions Varushamellam Vasantham (2002) and Pallavan (2003), which failed to achieve commercial success. Later, he starred in Sathyaraj's Maha Nadigan (2004) in a cameo role and did a negative role in the unreleased Telugu–Tamil bilingual film Lemon (2004) co-starring Sai Kiran, Chaya Singh and Ishaq Hussaini. After the film Saadhuriyan (2005), he took a hiatus from acting.

He worked as an assistant to his father for the Hindi-Tamil bilingual film Cinema in 2006, which had a delayed release in 2008 in Tamil as Bommalattam and in 2016 in Hindi as Final Cut of Director. From 2008 till 2010, he worked as an assistant to director S. Shankar in his magnum opus Enthiran, in which he played Rajinikanth's body double in a few sequences. Since 2007, it has been reported that Manoj was set to remake his father's Sigappu Rojakkal, but the film still remained in pre-production. In 2012, director Vetriveeran cast him as the antagonist for his film Kadhal Theevu but the film underwent a change of director and he was late removed from the project. That same year, his father signed him up to replace Ameer in his production Annakodiyum Kodiveeranum, as an antagonist, thus marking a return to films after a seven-year sabbatical. His plans on directing a comedy film featuring music by Yuvan Shankar Raja in 2016 also did not reach frutition. In 2018, he made the short film Pavithra featuring students of Bharathiraja's film college. In 2023, he made his feature film directorial debut with Margazhi Thingal.

== Personal life and death ==
On 19 November 2006, Manoj married his longtime friend actress Nandana, who has appeared in Malayalam and Tamil films. Nandana was his co-star in the film Saadhuriyan. The marriage was held at Ashirwad Marriage Hall at Kozhikode, Kerala, homeplace of Nandana, whilst a grand reception took place on 1 December 2006 at Mayor Ramanathan Chettiar Hall in Chennai, Tamil Nadu. The couple had 2 daughters, Arthika and Mathivadani.

Manoj died from a cardiac arrest on 25 March 2025, at the age of 48. The actor had undergone open-heart surgery at SIMS Hospital a month earlier and was recuperating at home. According to reports, he had been feeling unwell for several days before experiencing a fatal heart attack.

== Filmography ==
=== As actor ===
- Note: he was often credited in films as Manoj K. Bharathi or simply Manoj.

Year	Title	Role	Notes
1985	Mudhal Mariyathai	Himself	Uncredited appearance in the title credits
1988	Kodi Parakkuthu	Himself	Uncredited appearance in the title credits
1992	Nadodi Thendral	Himself	Uncredited appearance in the title credits
1993	Captain Magal	Himself	Uncredited appearance in the title credits
1999	Taj Mahal	Maayan	
2001	Samudhiram	Chinnarasu	
2001	Kadal Pookkal	Peter	
2002	Alli Arjuna	Arivazhagan (Arivu)	
2002	Varushamellam Vasantham	Raja	
2003	Pallavan	Pallavan	
2003	Eera Nilam	Duraisamy	
2004	Maha Nadigan	Muthu	
2005	Saadhuriyan		
2010	Enthiran	Body double for Vaseegaran and Chitti	As assistant director; for Sana's birthday and car sequences
2013	Annakodi	Sadayan	Also co-producer
2015	Baby	Shiva	
2015	Kathirvel Kaakha	Velraj	
2016	Ennama Katha Vudranunga	Himself	Cameo appearance in the title song
2016	Vaaimai	Manibarathi	
2017	Chocolate Baby	—N/a	Music video
2019	Valayal		
2019	Champion	Gold Star Gopi	
2020	Meendum Oru Mariyathai	—N/a	As co-producer
2021	Eeswaran	Younger Periyasamy	
2021	Maanaadu	John Mathew	
2022	Viruman	Muthukutty	Final film role

==== Television ====
Year	Title	Role	Notes	Ref.
2024	Snakes and Ladders	Mahalingam	Amazon Prime Video	

=== As film director ===
Year	Title	Notes	Ref.
2020	Whistle	short film	
2020	Pavithra	short film; released on ShortFlix	
2023	Margazhi Thingal	Won—Edison Award for Feel Good Entertainer	

=== As playback singer ===
Year	Title	Song	Composer	Co-singers	Notes	Ref.
1999	Taj Mahal	"Eechi Elumichi"	A. R. Rahman	Arundhathi, Raqeeb Alam		
2001	Pathinaru Vayathinile	"Vaikarai Velaile"	T. S. Muralidharan	—	Album	
2001	Pathinaru Vayathinile	"Pathinaaru Vayathanile"	T. S. Muralidharan	Meena	Album	
2001	Pathinaru Vayathinile	"Madura Mailu Eiva"	T. S. Muralidharan	Meena	Album	
2001	Pathinaru Vayathinile	"Oirele Kalanthu"	T. S. Muralidharan	—	Album	
2001	Pathinaru Vayathinile	"Karisa Kaadutha Kadhal"	T. S. Muralidharan	Meena	Album	
2001	Pathinaru Vayathinile	"Kadhal Vanthu"	T. S. Muralidharan	—	Album	
