= Kalinga (film) =

2006 film

- Directed by: Ram Prabha
- Produced by: Paul Brothers
- Starring: Bala; Nandana; Janagaraj; Rajan P. Dev
- Cinematography: Suryaa
- Edited by: Suresh Urs
- Music by: D. Imman
- Release date: 26 May 2006
- Country: India
- Language: Tamil

Kalinga is a 2006 Indian Tamil-language film directed by Ram Prabha and produced by Paul Brothers. The film stars Bala and Nandana, while Janagaraj and Rajan P. Dev play supporting roles. The music was composed by D. Imman, and the film was released on 26 May 2006.

== Cast ==
- Bala as Kalinga
- Nandana as Jyothi
- Rajan P. Dev as Chanakya
- Janagaraj
- Ponnambalam
- Anu Mohan
- Pasi Sathya
- Nellai Siva
- Omakuchi Narasimhan
- Master Chandrahasan

== Production ==
In March 2005, scenes were shot amid the public at Neelangarai Beach in Chennai.

== Soundtrack ==
Kalinga

Soundtrack album by D. Imman
- Released: 2006
- Genre: Feature film soundtrack
- Language: Tamil

D. Imman chronology
| Thalai Nagaram (2006) | Kalinga (2006) | Kusthi (2006) |

All music is composed by D. Imman.

Track listing
| No. | Title | Lyrics | Singer(s) | Length |
|---|---|---|---|---|
| 1. | "Mazhai Saaralai" | Viveka | P. Unnikrishnan |
| 2. | "Kadhale" | Muthu Vijayan | V. V. Prasanna |
| 3. | "Dhool Machi" | Muthu Vijayan | D. Imman |
| 4. | "Kaapathungo" | Viveka | Karthik |
| 5. | "Kooppiduda" | Victor Dass | Manikka Vinayagam, Grace Karunas |
| 6. | "Oruthi" | Pa. Vijay | Madhu Balakrishnan |

== Reception ==
Malini Mannath, a critic from Chennai Online, wrote "it's a more painful one for the audience to sit through it" and that "it's like the director had somewhere along the way lost track of his script and given up on his film". A reviewer from Cinesouth wrote "there was nothing worth mentioning" and that "except for a few rare scenes, none are worth mentioning and director Ram Prabha is indeed lucky to have got a producer".
