= Pathinaru Vayathinile (album) =

Pathinaru Vayathanile

Studio album by T. S. Muralidharan
- Released: 2001 (India)
- Recorded: 1998
- Genre: Indian pop
- Label: Ramiy Records

Pathinaru Vayathanile (transl. At the age of sixteen) is the debut studio album by T. S. Muralidharan, released in 2001.

== Production ==
While in school I even had a troupe called 'Black Snow'. And it was quite popular. When the chance to sing for a private album came, I ventured into it. It was a different experience.

— Manoj Bharathiraja

The music for the album was composed in 1998. Manoj Bharathiraja sang six songs of the album, which marked his playback singing debut. Meena also made her playback singing debut through the album after being approached by Manoj. The album was named after the 1977 film of the same name, which was directed by Bharathiraja, Manoj's father.

== Release ==
Ajith Kumar and Vikram attended the audio release function in 2001 as the chief guests.

== Track listing ==
All of the songs were composed by T. S. Muralidharan. (Note: Although Muralidharan is credited as the music director, Manoj said in an interview that he composed the music for the album himself.) The lyrics were written by Pushpavasagan.

Track listing
No.	Title	Singer(s)	Length
1.	"Vaikarai Velaile"	Manoj	—
2.	"Kadhal Vanthu"	Meena	—
3.	"Pathinaru Vayathinile"	Meena, Manoj	—
4.	"Madura Mailu Eiva"	Meena, Manoj	—
5.	"Oirele Kalanthu"	Manoj	—
6.	"Karisa Kaadutha Kadhal"	Meena, Manoj	—
7.	"Kadhal Vanthu"	Manoj	—
8.	"Seetha Kalyanam"	Tippu	—
9.	"Azhaka Azhaka"	Dheepa	—
10.	"Madura Mailu Eiva"	Meena, Tippu	—
Total length:			—

== Music videos ==
The music videos for the album were directed by Pushpavasagan and feature Manoj and Meena.

== Reception ==
Venky of Chennai Online described the album's originality, sound quality and lyrics all as "average".

== Legacy ==
Prior to the album's release, A. R. Rahman heard Manoj's work as a playback singer from this album and offered him to sing one of the versions of "Eechi Elemichi" in the film. This album is notably the only album to feature Meena's voice as her second album Kadhalism, which she also worked on in 2001, remains unreleased. Pushpavasagan and Muralidharan collaborated again for Sri (2002).
