= Palakkad Sreeram =

Indian film singer (born 1972)

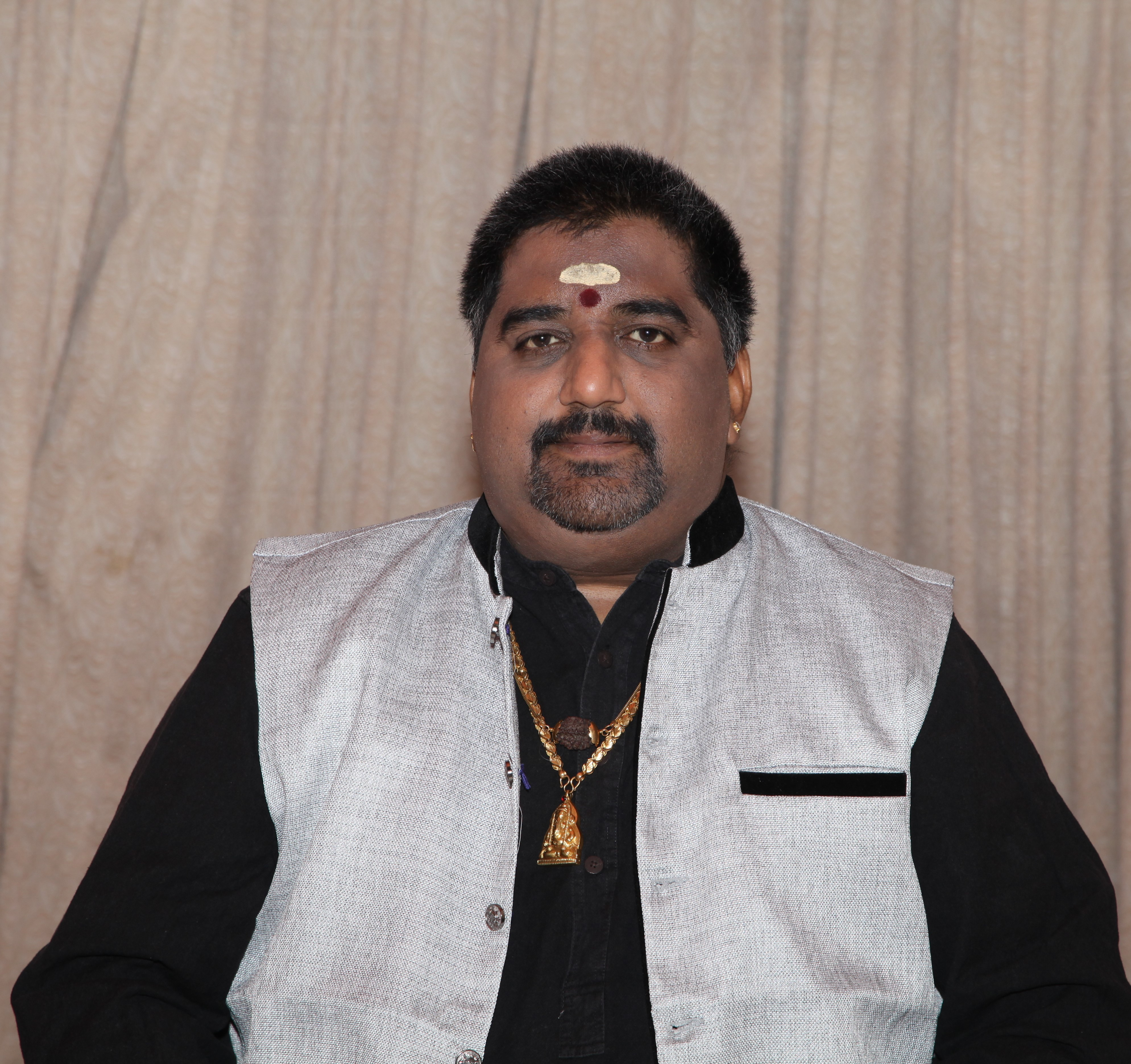

Background information
- Born: Kavassery Lakshminarayanan Sreeram; 16 February 1972 (age 54); Palakkad
- Occupation: Musician
- Instrument: Flute
- Years active: 1996 - present

Palakkad Sreeram (born 16 February 1972) is an Indian playback singer who predominantly works in Tamil cinema. He is known for his frequent collaborations with A. R. Rahman.

== Early life ==
Sreeram was born on 16 February 1972 in a Tamil Iyer family to Smt. Jayalaksmi and Sri. K. S. Lakshmi Narayanan in a village Kavasseri near Alathur, Palakkad district in Kerala. He completed his post graduation in Music from Govt. College Chittur, Calicut University and moved to Madras for his musical journey.

== Career ==
Sreeram started learning music under his mother from very young age and also under Sri. Sundareswara bhagavathar, and he had an immense passion on musical instruments. He owns an audio label Swararnavam, and has scored music for two Malayalam films, Mazhamegha Pravukal and Melvilasam Sariyanu. He moved to Chennai in 1995 soon after his marriage and he had learnt flute by himself. He made his debut in the film industry as a flutist in 1996. In 2022, he received the Kerala Sangeetha Nataka Akademi Award.

Sreeram has predominantly worked with composer A. R. Rahman, singing notable songs such as "Vetri Kodi Kattu" from Padayappa (1999) and "Liquid Dance" in Slumdog Millionaire (2008). He has also worked with Yuvan Shankar Raja and Devi Sri Prasad, among other composers.

== Personal life ==
Sreeram is married to Baby, a vocalist and composer, and they have two children, a son Bharath and a daughter Anagha.

== Discography ==
=== As playback singer ===
==== Tamil songs ====
Year	Film	Song	Composer	Co-artist(s)
1998	Uyire (D)	"Thaiyya Thaiyya"	A. R. Rahman	Sukhwinder Singh, Malgudi Subha
1999	Padayappa	"Vetri Kodi Kattu"	A. R. Rahman	
1999	Padayappa	"Minsara Poove"	A. R. Rahman	Srinivas, Nithyasree Mahadevan
1999	Taj Mahal	"Thirupaachi"	A. R. Rahman	Kalpana Raghavendar, Clinton Cerejo, Chandran
1999	En Swasa Kaatre	"Kadhal Niagara"	A. R. Rahman	Harini, Anupama
2001	Paarthale Paravasam	"Love Check"	A. R. Rahman	
2002	Ivan	"Ulagame Nee"	Ilaiyaraaja	
2003	Saamy	"Tirunelveli Halwada"	Harris Jayaraj	
2004	Kovil	"Arali Vidhaiyil"	Harris Jayaraj	
2004	Gajendra	"Gaja Varanda"	S. A. Rajkumar	
2004	Chatrapathy	"Naanga Ninna"	S. A. Rajkumar	Pop Shalini, Kalpana Raghavendar
2004	Manmadhan	"Vaanamunna"	Yuvan Shankar Raja	Shankar Mahadevan
2004	Arasatchi	"Kozhaa Puttu Penney"	Harris Jayaraj	Srilekha Parthasarathy
2004	Arul	"Punnakunnu"	Harris Jayaraj	Tippu
2004	Aai	"Neathi Adida Aai"	Srikanth Deva	Javed Ali, Gopal Sharma, Kumar, Suchitra
2005	Maayavi	"Tamizh Naattil"	Devi Sri Prasad	Malathy Lakshman
2005	Sandakozhi	"Mundasu Sooriyane"	Yuvan Shankar Raja	Karthik
2005	Thotti Jaya	"Yaari Singari"	Harris Jayaraj	Ceylon Manohar, Karthik, Srilekha Parthasarathy
2008	Kaalai	"Veeramulla"	G. V. Prakash Kumar	Manikka Vinayagam, Sirkazhi G. Sivachidambaram
2008	Slumdog Millionaire	"Liquid Dance"	A. R. Rahman	Srimathumitha
2011	Thoonga Nagaram	"Vaigai Siricha Thoonganagaram"	Sundar C Babu	
2011	Rowthiram	Theme Music	Prakash Nikki	
2011	Kanchana	"Kodiavanin Kadhaya"	Thaman S	MLR Karthikeyan, Malathy Lakshman
2012	Attakathi	"Podi Vechi Pudippan"	Santhosh Narayanan	Sathyan, Brinda
2012	Madhubana Kadai	"Samarasam Ulavum"	Ved Shankar	
2013	Annakodi	"Kola Vaala Edungada"	G. V. Prakash Kumar	A. R. Reihana, Maya
2013	Irandaam Ulagam	"Raakozhi Raakozhi"	Harris Jayaraj	Hariharan
2014	Vallinam	"Vallinam"	Thaman S	Rahul Nambiar, Ranjith, Naveen Madhav
2014	Poojai	"Odi Odi"	Yuvan Shankar Raja	
2015	Savaale Samaali	"Savaale Samaali"	Thaman S	
2017	Valla Desam	"Megam Kalaivathillai"	R. K. Sundar	
2022	Ponniyin Selvan: I	"Ratchasa Maamaney"	A. R. Rahman	Shreya Ghoshal, Mahesh Vinayakram

==== Kannada songs ====
Year	Film	Song	Composer	Co-artist(s)
2016	Kaala Bhairava	"Neene Maharaja"	Jassie Gift	

==== Malayalam songs ====
Year	Film	Song	Composer	Language	Co-artist(s)
2000	Thenkasipattanam	"Kadamizhiyil (Version 2)"	Suresh Peters	Malayalam	Swarnalatha
2001	Raavanaprabhu	"Pottukuthedi"	Suresh Peters	Malayalam	
2001	Rakshasa Rajavu	"Indumathi Ithal"	Mohan Sithara	Malayalam	
2012	Thalsamayam Oru Penkutty	"Oh Thingal Pakshi"	Sharreth	Malayalam	
2014	Isaac Newton S/O Philipose	"Thengum"	Bijibal	Malayalam	
2015	The Reporter	"Ekayayi"	Sharreth	Malayalam	
2015	The Reporter	"Varmathiye"	Sharreth	Malayalam	
2015	KL 10 Patthu	"Enthaanu Khalbe"	Bijibal	Malayalam	Soumya Ramakrishnan, Najim Arshad
2017	Mom	"Kaandil Ellam"	A. R. Rahman	Malayalam	Pooja, Sharanya Srinivas, Blaaze
2018	Contessa	"Takka Takka"	Jafriz	Malayalam	

==== Telugu songs ====
Year	Film	Song	Composer	Language	Co-artist(s)
2004	Venky	"Silakemo"	Devi Sri Prasad	Telugu	Malathy Lakshman
2013	Attarintiki Daredi	"Deva Devam"	Devi Sri Prasad	Telugu	M. S. Subbulakshmi, Rita

=== Albums ===
Year	Album	Song	Composer	Language	Co-artist(s)
2014	Mahalakshmi Kataksham	"Khanana Khan Khanita"	M. M. Srilekha	Telugu	
2020	Soul of Anamika	Greesjmame Sakhi		Malayalam	

== Filmography ==
Year	Film	Role	Notes
2023	Japan	Doctor	Tamil film
