= Mr. 420 =

Mr. 420 may refer to:

- Mr. 420 (1992 film), a Pakistani Urdu film
- Mr. 420 (2012 film), an Indian Kannada-language romantic comedy film
