= Varushamellam Vasantham =

- Film poster
- Directed by: R. Ravi Shankar
- Written by: R. Ravi Shankar
- Produced by: R. B. Choudary
- Starring: Manoj; Kunal; Anita Hassanandani
- Cinematography: Rajarajan
- Edited by: M. N. Raja
- Music by: Sirpy
- Production company: Super Good Films
- Release date: 3 May 2002
- Country: India
- Language: Tamil

Varushamellam Vasantham (transl. Spring All Year) is a 2002 Indian Tamil-language romantic drama film directed by R. Ravi Shankar in his debut, and produced by R. B. Choudary of Super Good Films. The film featured Manoj, Kunal and Anita Hassanandani (her Tamil debut) in the lead roles, while M. N. Nambiar and Sukumari play supporting roles. The film, which had music composed by Sirpy, opened on 3 May 2002. The film was remade in Telugu as Manchivaadu.. The film became a box office success praising specifically on Manoj's performance but remain the only hit film in his career.

== Plot ==
Raja is an unemployed, carefree, lazy young man who lives in Thenkasi with an extended family consisting of his grandfather Paramasivam, grandmother, parents, uncle, aunt and paternal cousins. Raja also has a brother Ramesh. Ramesh is a year younger than Raja and works as a successful software engineer in Delhi. Paramasivam is a rich and well-respected retired IAS officer who favours Ramesh since he is well-educated and obedient. He often speaks ill of Raja and degrades him constantly, going so far as to leave him out of his daily prayers.

Paramasivam's niece, husband, and daughter Latha move from Kolkata to Raja's home to stay for a short while.Raja is instantly captivated by Latha and, drawn by a deep curiosity and admiration, begins seeking ways to gently enter her world and earn her friendship. He soon finds out that Ramesh is also attracted to Latha and is determined to win her over. Raja realises that he needs to impress Latha so that she will choose him over Ramesh and tries to change his lifestyle. Taking the advice of a friend, he tries to get a job as a collector, but he is turned away due to his lack of education. He then tries to learn English, but he is so hopeless that his teacher eventually gives up.

Meanwhile, Ramesh tries to sabotage his brother's efforts. He convinces Raja that Latha is very fond of sapota, a fruit which she actually hates and is allergic to. Raja delivers baskets of sapota to Latha, but she has an allergic reaction, and this causes a rift in their friendship. Raja is disheartened after his many failures and the attitude of his brother and grandfather. His hope is renewed one day after a conversation with Latha, where she mentions that wealth and education should not affect the love two people have for each other. She says that a single flower bought by a person who works hard is worth more than gifts worth thousands.

Raja eventually finds a job at a metal factory, where he works long hours doing dangerous work. Paramasivam witnesses Raja working, overhears some of the labourers talking about what a hard worker he is, and sees a change in his grandson and softens his approach towards him.

Latha (later known as "Anarkali") celebrates her 23rd birthday with a grand party, and Ramesh presents her with a costly laptop computer. Ashamed, Raja tries to hide his gift (some cheap clothing wrapped in plain paper), but Latha insists on trying on the outfit immediately. Paramasivam realises that the change in Raja was brought about by Latha and proposes a marriage between the two. To everyone's surprise, Raja declines, despite the fact that he loves Latha. Paramasivam is embarrassed and enraged, telling Raja that he will never find a girl who is educated and well-respected like Latha. He also says that Raja will forever be useless and lazy and threatens to cut off his grandson's inheritance. Raja decides to move out and continue working at the metal factory.

Ramesh, who was aware of Raja's feelings towards Latha, confronts his brother about his rejection of the marriage proposal. Raja reveals that Latha had confided in him that she is actually in love with Ramesh. Shocked, Ramesh asks his brother why he did not just stay silent and accept the marriage. Raja says that love should come from both sides and cannot be forced. Ramesh is astonished by this and is grateful for Raja's kind character. He asks for forgiveness and the brothers reconcile. Paramasivam overhears this conversation and is overcome with guilt. After an emotional exchange, he welcomes Raja back home and now treats his him with affection and love and speaks of him with pride.

== Cast ==
- Manoj Bharathiraja as Raja, Paramasivan's grandson
- Kunal as Ramesh, Raja's younger brother and Paramasivan's grandson
- Anita Hassanandani as Latha
- M. N. Nambiar as Paramasivam
- Mayilsamy as Velayudham, Tea Shop Owner
- Madhan Bob as Latha's father
- Anu Mohan as Subramaniam, Raja and Ramesh's father
- Pandu as Raja and Ramesh's paternal uncle
- Nalini as Saroja, Latha's mother
- Sukumari as Meenakshi, Raja and Ramesh's grandmother
- Subhashini as Raja's mother
- Y. Vijaya as Rose Mary, English tutor
- Malini
- Sembuli Jagan as Raja's friend
- Neelu as a district collector
- Kottachi as Raja's friend
- M. R. Krishnamurthy as Venkataraman "Venkat"
- Kulir Kumaresan as Venkat's son-in-law
- Raghava Lawrence in a special appearance in "Naan Ready Neenga Readya"
- Sanghavi in a cameo appearance
- Anandaraj in a cameo appearance as an Inspector

== Production ==
After working as an assistant director and lyric writer in the 1990s, Ra. Ravishankar debuted as a film director through Varushamellam Vasantham. Raghava Lawrence was initially signed to act in a leading role in the film, alongside Manoj, but was later replaced by Kunal though Lawrence made a cameo appearance for a song.

== Soundtrack ==
The soundtrack was composed by Sirpy. The song "Adi Anarkali" was initially meant to be sung by Sujatha Mohan, but after she heard a rough version of the song sung by Ganga Sitharasu, she requested Sirpy to retain Ganga's vocals for the final version.

Song	Singers	Lyrics
"Adi Anarkali"	P. Unnikrishnan, Ganga Sitharasu	R.Ravishankar
"Enge Andha Vennila" (F)	Sujatha	R.Ravishankar
"Enge Andha Vennila" (M)	Unni Menon	R.Ravishankar
"Hello Darling"	Tippu	R.Ravishankar
"Mudhal Mudhalai"	P. Unnikrishnan, Sujatha	R.Ravishankar
"Naan Ready"	Krishnaraj, K. S. Chithra	Manavai Ponmanikkam

== Critical reception ==
Malathi Rangarajan from The Hindu wrote that it was "a neat family drama that is not completely crisp". Ayyappa Prasad of Screen wrote, "With good performance from the artistes and melodious music by Sirpy and Rajarajan’s cinematography capturing the scenic beauty of the countryside, the film is a good family entertainer." Tulika of Rediff.com called the film a "clean family drama" and wrote that "Sirpy's music complements the typical story. Cinematography, editing and other departments blend well, but fail to deliver a sensational film". Malini Mannath of Chennai Online wrote, "It is the director's first work and he shows promise. Setting his ambience well, moving his narration fairly engagingly, handling effectively the scenes of one-upmanship between siblings who fall in love with the same girl. But the narration tends to drag at times, and it is the comedy track that keeps it going then". Cinesouth wrote, "It's pretty obvious that the director only had a good story and some good scenes and that the unit had rushed to the shooting spots with only these.vIf only they had paid some more attention to the screenplay, then this would have been a stunning good film."

== Awards ==
The film won two Tamil Nadu State Film Awards: Best Lyricist (Ravishankar) and Best Male Playback Singer (Unni Menon).
