= Ganga Sitharasu =

Indian playback singer

Ganga
- Born: Ganga Krishnan; 16 December; Kozhikode, Kerala, India
- Genres: Playback singing
- Occupations: Singer, Backing Vocals
- Years active: 1993–present

Ganga Sitharasu is an Indian playback singer who has worked in the Indian film industry. Ganga worked extensively with A. R. Rahman during the late 1990s and early 2000s, while also regularly collaborating with M. M. Keeravani.

== Career ==
The child of professors A. Krishnan and Vatsala Krishnan, Ganga learnt carnatic music as a child and became interested in singing with the encouragement of her guru Sri Haripad K. P. N. Pillai and Lakshmi, a music teacher at her school. After winning several inter-school competitions for carnatic and light music, Ganga was encouraged by her friends to try her luck in the film industry as a playback singer. In June 1992, she went to Chennai with her father and met composer M. M. Keeravani, who gave her the first opportunity to make a voice recording, while dubbing a movie titled Aanenna Pennenna from Telugu to Tamil. In the year 1993, she completed her graduation in B. A. English Literature and then also achieved a Diploma in Carnatic Music, Sangeetha Ratna, from the Music Academy in 1995. Later she joined A. R. Rahman’s chorus and initially worked in a group singing harmonies, before being given individual tracks. She worked as a part of several of Rahman's films in the chorus from Pudhiya Mannargal (1993) to Lagaan (2001).

Her first lead song was released in 1994 which was in Malayalam movie, Pakshe, where she had sung a duet with K. J. Yesudas with music composed by Johnson. Her first Tamil solo song was in 1997 for the film, Ponmanam with music by S. A. Rajkumar. In 2001, she got her first Telugu opportunity again from Keeravani and sung four songs in the movie Akasa Veedhilo. He also later introduced her to the Kannada field in the film, Deepavali. For her work, she has been awarded as the best female singer by Tamilnadu Cinema Kalai Manram twice; first in 2002 for the film Samuthiram and then in 2005 for the film Devathaiyai Kanden. She later also received acclaim for her work with Mani Sharma, and notably sang the "Mambalam" song from Pokkiri (2007).

== Television ==
Year	Name of Television Show	Role	Network
2024	Sa Re Ga Ma Pa Seniors 4	Jury (Mentor)	Zee Tamil

== Personal life ==
Ganga is married to V. Sitharasu, a leading photographer in the Tamil film industry. She is blessed with two male children

== Awards ==
Golden Diva of Playback singing - Isai24x7 Digital Music Awards www.isai24x7.com (For her 25 years of Playback singing)

== Notable discography ==
Year	Song title	Film	Music director	Notes
1994	"Sooryamshuvoro"	Pakshe	Johnson	Malayalam
1995	"Uyire Uyire"	Bombay	A. R. Rahman	
1995	"Kokku Saiva Kokku"	Muthu	A. R. Rahman	
1998	"Nilavinai Thottu"	Ponmanam	S. A. Rajkumar	
1999	"Nenaichchapadi"	Kadhalar Dhinam	A. R. Rahman	
1999	"Adi Manjakelange"	Taj Mahal	A. R. Rahman	
1999	"Kizhakke Nandavanam"	Taj Mahal	A. R. Rahman	
2000	"Bhanu Varusha"	Deepavali	M. M. Keeravani	Kannada
2001	"Machha Machhiniye"	Star	A. R. Rahman	
2001	"Paarthale Paravasam"	Paarthale Paravasam	A. R. Rahman	
2002	"Adi Anarkali"	Varushamellam Vasantham	Sirpy	
2003	"Duddilde Hodaru"	Namma Preethiya Ramu	Ilaiyaraaja	Kannada
2003	"Megam Karukkuthu"	Eera Nilam	Sirpy	Tamil
2003	"Nadiridinna"	Okariki Okaru	M. M. Keeravani	Telugu
2004	"Om Santhi"	Anji	Mani Sharma	Telugu
2005	"Azhage Brammanidam"	Devathaiyai Kanden	Deva	
2007	"Mambalam"	Pokkiri	Mani Sharma	
