= List of Tamil films of 2002 =

Post-amendment to the Tamil Nadu Entertainments Tax Act 1939 on 12 June 2000, gross fell to 125 per cent of nett. The Commercial Taxes Department disclosed ₹71.19 crore in entertainment tax revenue for the year.

A list of films released in the Tamil film industry in India in 2002:

== Box office collection ==
The following is the list of highest-grossing Tamil cinema films released in 2002.

The Highest Worldwide Gross of 2002
Rank	Title	Production company	Worldwide gross
1	Ramanaa	Aascar Films	₹33 crore
2	Baba	Lotus International	₹30 crore
3	Villain	NIC Arts	₹27 crore
4	Gemini	AVM Productions	₹25 crore
5	Run	Sri Surya Movies	₹20 crore
6	Panchatanthiram	Sri Rajlakshmi Films (P) Ltd	₹19 crore
7	Youth	Lakshmi Productions	₹18 crore
8	Kannathil Muthamittal	Madras Talkies	₹18 crore
9	Bagavathi	Lakshmi Movie Makers; Kalasangham Films	₹17 crore
10	Pammal K. Sambandam	Media Dreams	₹16 crore

== List of Tamil films ==
=== January—March ===
Opening		Title	Director	Cast	Studio	Ref
J A N	14	Alli Arjuna	Saran	Manoj Bharathiraja, Richa Pallod, Preetha	Janani Art Creations	
J A N	14	Azhagi	Thangar Bachan	Parthiban, Nandita Das, Devayani	Udayageetha Cine Creations	
J A N	14	Pammal K. Sambandam	Mouli	Kamal Haasan, Simran, Abbas, Sneha	Sri Rajlakshmi Films	
J A N	14	Punnagai Desam	K. Shajahan	Tarun, Kunal, Sneha, Hamsavardhan, Preetha	Super Good Films	
J A N	14	Red	Ram Sathya	Ajith Kumar, Priya Gill, Salim Ghouse	NIC Arts	
J A N	14	Vivaramana Aalu	K. Selva Bharathy	Sathyaraj, Devayani, Mumtaj, Vivek	Evergreen Movie International	
F E B	8	Amaiyappa	Rama Murugapandian	Ponnambalam, Roshini, Mahanadi Shankar	Ampa Pictures	
F E B	8	Shakalaka Baby	Rama Narayanan	Roja, Vivek, Vadivelu, Radhika Chaudhari	Shivakami Production	
F E B	14	Dhaya	Senthil Kumar	Prakash Raj, Meena, Raghuvaran	Duet Movies	
F E B	14	Kannathil Muthamittal	Mani Ratnam	R. Madhavan, Simran, Nandita Das	Madras Talkies	
F E B	15	Charlie Chaplin	Sakthi Chidambaram	Prabhu, Prabhu Deva, Abhirami, Gayathri Raguram	Roja Combines	
F E B	22	Kamarasu	P. C. Anbazhagan	Murali, Laila, Chandrasekhar, Srividya	Shanthi Vanaraja Films	
F E B	22	Roja Kootam	Sasi	Srikanth, Bhoomika, Radhika	Oscar Films	
M A R	15	Saptham	Sivaguru	Rishi, Rithiga, Sriman, Abhinayashree	Saburaa International	

=== April—June ===
Opening		Title	Director	Cast	Studio	Ref
A P R	12	Gemini	Saran	Vikram, Kiran, Kalabhavan Mani	AVM Productions	
A P R	12	Raajjiyam	Manoj Kumar	Vijayakanth, Dileep, Shamita Shetty, Priyanka Trivedi,	Guru Films	
A P R	12	Sri Bannari Amman	Bharathi Kannan	Karan, Khushbu, Vijayashanti	Sri Mahalakshmi Productions	
A P R	12	Thamizh	Hari	Prashanth, Simran, Vadivelu, Nassar	Deivanai Movies	
A P R	12	Thamizhan	Majith	Vijay, Priyanka Chopra, Nassar	GV Films	
A P R	19	Junior Senior	J. Suresh	Mammooty, Hamsavardhan, Charulatha, Leena	Sakthi International	
M A Y	3	Varushamellam Vasantham	Ravi Shankar	Manoj Bharathiraja, Kunal, Anita	Super Good Films	
M A Y	10	Thulluvadho Ilamai	Kasthuri Raja	Dhanush, Sherin, Abhinay	Karthik Cine Visions	
M A Y	10	Unnai Ninaithu	Vikraman	Suriya, Laila, Sneha	Lakshmi Movie Makers	
M A Y	16	Pesadha Kannum Pesume	Murali Krishna	Kunal, Monal, Mamtha	Mega Movie Hits	
M A Y	24	Nettru Varai Nee Yaaro	A. Sridhar	Hamsavardhan, Ruchita Prasad	Nivedhitha Cine Arts	
M A Y	31	Enge Enadhu Kavithai	Aravind	Kunal, Rathi, Krishna Abhishek	Ashco Media Arts	
J U N	1	123	K. Subash	Prabhu Deva, Jyothika, Raju Sundaram, Nagendra Prasad	Sidhesh Films	
J U N	14	Devan	Arun Pandian	Vijayakanth, Arun Pandian, Meena, Kausalya	Friends Creations	
J U N	21	Ezhumalai	Arjun	Arjun, Simran, Gajala, Mumtaj	Sri Venkateswara Production	
J U N	21	Thenkasi Pattanam	Rafi Mecartin	Sarath Kumar, Napoleon, Devayani, Samyuktha Varma	Mass Movie Makers	
J U N	27	Panchatanthiram	K. S. Ravikumar	Kamal Haasan, Simran, Ramya Krishnan	Sri Rajlakshmi Films	

=== July—September ===
Opening		Title	Director	Cast	Studio	Ref
J U L	5	Raja	Ezhil	Ajith Kumar, Jyothika, Priyanka Trivedi	Serene Movie Makers	
J U L	12	Samurai	Balaji Sakthivel	Vikram, Anita, Jaya Seel	Aalayam Productions	
J U L	13	Yai! Nee Romba Azhaga Irukey!	Vasanth	Shaam, Sneha, Jaya Re	GV Films	
J U L	19	Guruvamma	Thamarai Sendhoorapandi	Livingston, Devayani	Sheem Work Media	
J U L	19	Shree	Pushpavasagan	Suriya, Shruthika, Gayatri Jayaraman	Venkateswaralayam	
J U L	19	Youth	Vincent Selva	Vijay, Sandhiya, Sindhu Menon	Lakshmi Productions	
A U G	2	Karmegham	S. P. Rajkumar	Mammooty, Abhirami	SSR Movies	
A U G	15	Baba	Suresh Krishna	Rajinikanth, Manisha Koirala, Ashish Vidyarthi	Lotus International	
A U G	23	Ivan	R. Parthiban	R. Parthiban, Soundarya, Meena	Bioscope Film Framers	
A U G	29	Plus 2	Krithik	Krithik, Suja Varunee	Friendship Creations	
A U G	30	Naina	Manobala	Jayaram, Manya	VSK Films	
A U G	30	Sundhara Travels	Thaha	Murali, Vadivelu, Radha	Yuvasree Creations	
S E P	5	Run	N. Lingusamy	R. Madhavan, Meera Jasmine, Atul Kulkarni	Sri Surya Movies	
S E P	6	King	Prabu Solomon	Vikram, Sneha	Indian Theatre Production	
S E P	12	Arputham	R. S. Venkatesh	Raghava Lawrence, Anu Prabhakar, Kunal	Super Good Films	
S E P	12	En Mana Vaanil	Vinayan	Jayasurya, Kavya Madhavan	Oscar Films	
S E P	20	Maaran	A. Jawahar	Sathyaraj, Seetha, Abhinayashree	Power Media	
S E P	20	Namma Veetu Kalyanam	V. Sekhar	Murali, Meena, Vindhya, Vivek, Vadivelu	Thiruvalluvar Kalaikoodam	
S E P	27	Samasthanam	Rajkapoor	Suresh Gopi, Sarath Kumar, Devayani, Abhirami	Roja Combines	
S E P	28	Jjunction	R. S. Ramanathan	Abhinay, Kanishka Sodhi, Aamna Sharif	Hi-Tec Media	

=== October—December ===
Opening		Title	Director	Cast	Studio	Ref
O C T	4	Album	Vasanthabalan	Aryan Rajesh, Shrutika	Kavithalayaa Productions	
O C T	4	Five Star	Susi Ganesan	Prasanna, Kanika, Krishna	Madras Talkies	
O C T	4	University	Pragahdeesh	Jeevan, Gajala	Maayaburi Screens	
N O V	4	Andipatti Arasampatti	Dhananjeyan	Pandiarajan, Mansoor Ali Khan, Visalini, Srilekha	Meena Cine Combines	
N O V	4	Bagavathi	A. Venkatesh	Vijay, Reemma Sen, Jai, Monika	Lakshmi Movie Makers	
N O V	4	Game	John Amritraj	Karthik, Radha, Divya Dutta	Srimasani Amman Pictures	
N O V	4	Kadhal Azhivathillai	T. Rajendar	Simbhu, Charmy	Simbhu Cine Arts	
N O V	4	Padai Veetu Amman	Pugazhmani	Ramki, Meena, Devayani	Televista Digitals	
N O V	4	Ramanaa	A. R. Murugadoss	Vijayakanth, Ashima Bhalla, Simran	Oscar Films	
N O V	4	Solla Marandha Kadhai	Thangar Bachan	Cheran, Rathi	P A Art Productions	
N O V	4	Villain	K. S. Ravikumar	Ajith Kumar, Meena, Kiran	NIC Arts	
N O V	29	April Maadhathil	S. S. Stanley	Srikanth, Sneha	G. J. Cinema	
N O V	29	Gummalam	Sughi S. Moorthy	Mithun Tejaswi, Rathi	Sharmadha Productions	
N O V	29	I Love You Da	C. Rajadurai	Raju Sundaram, Simran	Guru Films	
D E C	6	Jaya	Rathnaraj	Ramya Krishnan, Sherin, Sriman	Ratna Films	
D E C	6	Mutham	S. A. Chandrasekhar	Arun Vijay, Nagendra Prasad, Charulatha, Nanditha	Digital Magic Productions	
D E C	13	Bala	Deepak	Shaam, Meera Jasmine	Goldmine Pictures	
D E C	13	Mounam Pesiyadhe	Ameer	Suriya, Trisha, Laila	Aparajeeth Films	
D E C	20	Kadhal Virus	Kathir	Richard Rishi, Sridevi Vijayakumar, Abbas	Sound & Light Studios	
D E C	20	Style	Sibi Chakravarthy	Raghava Lawrence, Gayathri Raguram, Khushbu	Thiru Films	
D E C	20	Virumbugiren	Susi Ganesan	Prashanth, Sneha	V. M. Creations	
D E C	27	Iravu Padagan	Roshan	Babu Ganesh, Gumtaj	Tamizhalaya Cine Circuit	
D E C	27	Kalai Kalluri	Chandrasekhar	Madoo, Swetha Rao	Gold Star Pictures	
D E C	27	Nanba Nanba	Jayabharathi	Chandrasekhar, Charle	Media Works	

Other releases

The following films also released in 2002, though the release date remains unknown.

Title	Director	Cast	Production
En Kadhali	Malai		SBS Art Productions
Gowri	A. C. Tirulokchandar		Cine Bharath
Isthri	Anil		Saravana Film Creations
Needhiyin Vasalile	K. Maniyarasu		MM Creations
Pudhiya Alai	Rajkathir	Jeevan Ravi, Abitha	Bhuvaneswari Cinemalayaa
Veetil Poochigal			Karunya Kalaikoodam

== Dubbed films ==
Opening	Title	Director(s)	Original film		Cast	Ref.
Opening	Title	Director(s)	Film	Language	Cast	Ref.
February 6	Rahasyam	Vikram Bhatt	Raaz	Hindi	Dino Morea, Bipasha Basu	
October 22	Vasu	V. M. Vinu	Akashathile Paravaigal	Malayalam	Kalabhavan Mani	
October 28	H2O Kaveri	Lokanath-Rajaram	H2O	Kannada	Upendra, Prabhu Deva	

== Awards ==
Category/Organization	Cinema Express Awards 21 December 2002	Dinakaran Cinema Awards 17 August 2003	Filmfare Awards South 24 May 2003	Tamil Nadu State Film Awards 30 September 2004
Best Film	Kannathil Muthamittal	Ramanaa	Azhagi	Ramanaa
Best Director	Bala; Nandhaa (2001)	K. S. Ravikumar; Villain	Mani Ratnam; Kannathil Muthamittal	Mani Ratnam; Kannathil Muthamittal
Best Actor	Vikram; Kasi (2001)	Ajith Kumar; Villain	Ajith Kumar; Villain	R. Madhavan; Anbe Sivam (2003), Kannathil Muthamittal, Run
Best Actress	Simran; Kannathil Muthamittal	Sneha; Virumbugiren	Simran; Kannathil Muthamittal	Meena; Ivan
Best Music Director	Bharadwaj; Gemini	Vidyasagar; Run	Bharadwaj; Gemini	Sirpy; Unnai Ninaithu
