= List of Tamil films of 2001 =

This is a list of Tamil language films released in India during 2001.

== Box office collection ==
The following is the list of highest-grossing Tamil cinema films released in 2001.

#	Implies that the film is multilingual and the gross collection figure includes the worldwide collection of the other simultaneously filmed version.

The Highest Worldwide Gross of 2001
Rank	Title	Production company	Worldwide gross
1	Friends	Swargachitra	₹25 crore
2	Dheena	Vijayam Cine Combines	₹20 crore
3	Citizen	NIC Arts	₹19 crore
4	Badri	Sri Venkateswara Art Films	₹17 crore
5	Poovellam Un Vaasam	Oscar Films	₹15 crore
6	Minnale	Cee (I) TV Entertainment	₹15 crore
7	Thavasi	GJ Cinema	₹14 crore
8	Aalavandhaan (Note: The film was simultaneously shot in Tamil and Hindi, with the latter version titled Abhay, with three different actors in supporting roles)	V Creations	₹13 crore
9	Shahjahan	Super Good Films	₹12 crore
10	Narasimha	Captain Cine Creations	₹10 crore

== List of Tamil films ==
=== January – March ===
Opening		Title	Director	Cast	Studio	Ref
J A N	14	Dheena	A. R. Murugadoss	Ajith Kumar, Suresh Gopi, Laila	Vijayam Cine Combines	
J A N	14	Friends	Siddique	Vijay, Suriya, Devayani, Vijayalakshmi, Vadivelu	Swargachitra	
J A N	14	Looty	Parameshwar	Sathyaraj, Roja, Mumtaj, Vadivelu, Vivek	Evergreen Movie International	
J A N	14	Nageswari	Rama Narayanan	Ramya Krishnan, Karan, Prithviraj, Vadivelu, Vivek	Sri Thenandal Films	
J A N	14	Pullanalum Pondatti	Adade Manohar	Adade Manohar, Viji	Jai Santoshi Maa Arts	
J A N	14	Vaanchinathan	Shaji Kailas	Vijayakanth, Sakshi Shivanand, Ramya Krishnan	Roja Combines	
J A N	29	Nila Kaalam	Gandhi Krishna	Master Dinesh, Master Udayaraj, Baby Ranjini, Roja	Media Dreams	
F E B
F E B	2	Minnale	Gautham Vasudev Menon	R. Madhavan, Reemma Sen, Abbas, Nagesh	Cee I TV Entertainments	
F E B	9	Engalukkum Kaalam Varum	Bala Rooban	Livingston, Kausalya, Vivek, Vadivelu	Anbalaya Films	
F E B	9	Ullam Kollai Poguthae	Sundar C.	Prabhu Deva, Anjala Zhaveri, Karthik	Lakshmi Movie Makers	
F E B	16	Piriyadha Varam Vendum	Kamal	Prashanth, Shalini, Jomol	Nekhela Enterprises	
F E B	16	Rishi	Sundar C.	Sarath Kumar, Meena, Sanghavi	P. A. Art Productions	
F E B	16	Thaalikaatha Kaaliamman	Somasundar	Prabhu, Kausalya, Sanghavi	Sunar Theatres	
M A R	7	En Purushan Kuzhandhai Maadhiri	S. P. Rajkumar	Livingston, Devayani, Vindhya	RR Movie Makers	
M A R	7	Ninaikkatha Naalillai	A. L. Raja	R. Parthiban, Rahman, Devayani, Kaveri	KRP Productions	
M A R	16	Paarvai Ondre Podhume	Murali Krishna	Kunal, Monal, Karan	Amudha Movie Makers	
M A R	30	Natchatra Kadhal	Nayakam	Ajay, Bhavana, Subbalakshmi, Ashok Rao	NRI Films International	
M A R	30	Vinnukum Mannukum	Rajakumaran	Vikram, Sarathkumar, Devayani, Khushbu	Super Good Films	

=== April – June ===
Opening		Title	Director	Cast	Studio	Ref
A P R	12	Badri	P. A. Arun Prasad	Vijay, Bhoomika, Monal	Sri Venkateswara Art Films	
A P R	13	Dumm Dumm Dumm	Azhagam Perumal	R. Madhavan, Jyothika, Vivek, Kalpana	Madras Talkies	
A P R	13	Little John	Singeetham Srinivasa Rao	Bentley Mitchum, Jyothika, Prakash Raj	Media Dreams	
A P R	13	Seerivarum Kaalai	Ramarajan	Ramarajan, Abitha	Kanna Cine Arts	
A P R	13	Sri Raja Rajeshwari	Bharathi Kannan	Ramki, Ramya Krishnan, Sanghavi, Bhanupriya	Sri Thenandal Films	
M A Y	11	En Iniya Pon Nilavae	Balu Mahendra	Pandiarajan, Mounika	SDR Movies	
M A Y	18	Asathal	P. Vasu	Sathyaraj, Ramya Krishnan, Vadivelu	Maala Creations	
M A Y	18	Middle Class Madhavan	T. P. Gajendran	Prabhu, Abhirami, Manivannan, Vadivelu, Vivek	KRG Movies	
M A Y	18	Sigamani Ramamani	Visu	Visu, S. V. Sekhar, Urvashi	Raj Co	
M A Y	25	Aanandham	N. Lingusamy	Mammootty, Murali, Devayani, Rambha, Abbas, Sneha	Super Good Films	
M A Y	25	Sonnal Thaan Kaadhala	T. Rajendar	T. Rajendar, Murali, Roja	Simbu Cine Arts	
J U N	8	Citizen	Saravana Subbiah	Ajith Kumar, Vasundhara Das, Meena, Nagma	NIC Arts	
J U N	8	Krishna Krishna	S. V. Sekhar	S. V. Sekhar, Sukanya, Ramesh Khanna	Media Dreams	
J U N	8	Kunguma Pottu Gounder	G. Sai Suresh	Sathyaraj, Rambha, Kausalya, Goundamani	Ganga Gowri Productions	
J U N	22	Love Channel	R. S. Kumaresan	Eashwar, Monika	Akshayaa Movies	
J U N	29	Dosth	S. A. Chandrasekhar	Sarath Kumar, Abhirami, Raghuvaran, Prakash Raj	Lakshmi Movie Makers	

=== July – September ===
Opening		Title	Director	Cast	Studio	Ref
J U L	6	Lovely	Shakti Chidambaram	Karthik, Malavika, Monal	Evergreen Film International	
J U L	13	Dhill	Dharani	Vikram, Laila, Vivek	Lakshmi Productions	
J U L	13	Narasimha	Thirupathisamy	Vijayakanth, Isha Koppikar, Ramya Krishnan	Captain Cine Creations	
J U L	20	Poove Pen Poove	K. Purushothaman	Ishaq Hussaini, Abitha	GVS Films	
J U L	27	Star	Praveen Gandhi	Prashanth, Jyothika, Raghuvaran	Sri Subajothi Movies	
J U L	27	Super Kudumbam	R. K. Kalaimani	Prabhu, Roja, Prathyusha	Mahalakshmi Films	
J U L	27	Kalakalappu	Vishwa	Napoleon, Jaya Seal, Vijayalakshmi	Kalaignar Kalaikoodam	
A U G	3	Kanna Unnai Thedukiren	Jeeva Selvaraj	Sathyan, Suvalakshmi, Anju Aravind	Iswarya Films International	
A U G	10	Kutty	Janaki Vishwanathan	P. Shwetha, Ramesh Aravind, Easwari Rao	Sruthika Foundations	
A U G	10	Viswanathan Ramamoorthy	Rama Narayanan	Ramki, Roja, Vivek, Vindhya	Sri Thenandal Films	
A U G	17	Poovellam Un Vasam	Ezhil	Ajith Kumar, Jyothika, Sivakumar, Nagesh	Oscar Films	
A U G	24	Vedham	Arjun	Arjun, Vineeth, Sakshi Shivanand, Divya Unni	Sree Raam Films International	
A U G	31	Samudhiram	K. S. Ravikumar	Sarath Kumar, Murali, Abhirami, Manoj, Sindhu Menon, Monal	Super Good Films	
S E P	7	Chocklet	A.Venkatesh	Prashanth, Jaya Re, Mumtaj	Movie Magic	
S E P	14	Alli Thandha Vaanam	Sridhar Prasad	Prabhu Deva, Laila, Murali	Roja Combines	
S E P	14	Maayan	Nassar	Nassar, Roja, Ranjitha	Ganaa Film Makers	
S E P	14	Veettoda Mappillai	V. Sekhar	Napoleon, Roja	Thiruvalluvar Kalaikoodam	
S E P	21	Pandavar Bhoomi	Cheran	Arun Vijay, Shamitha, Rajkiran	Media Dreams	
S E P	28	12B	Jeeva	Shaam, Simran, Jyothika	Film Works	
S E P	28	Kabadi Kabadi	Pandiarajan	Pandiarajan, Sangeetha	Saranya Cine Creations	

=== October – December ===
Opening		Title	Director	Cast	Studio	Ref
O C T	5	Mitta Miraasu	Kalanjiyam	Prabhu, Roja Selvamani, Napoleon, Mumtaj	Udhayam International Films	
O C T	12	Asokavanam	Thakkali Srinivasan	Livingston, Rajashri, Sriman	Housefull Pictures	
N O V	14	Aalavandhan	Suresh Krishna	Kamal Haasan, Raveena Tandon, Manisha Koirala	V Creations	
N O V	14	Aandan Adimai	Manivannan	Sathyaraj, Suvalakshmi, Divya Unni	KDK International Films	
N O V	14	Kaatrukkenna Veli	Pugazhendhi Thangaraj	Sujitha, Sriman, Khushbu, C. Arunpandian	Thaai Movie Makers	
N O V	14	Manadhai Thirudivittai	R. D. Narayanamurthy	Prabhu Deva, Kausalya, Gayatri Jayaraman	KRG Movies	
N O V	14	Nandhaa	Bala	Suriya, Laila, Rajkiran	Aparajith Films	
N O V	14	Paarthale Paravasam	K. Balachandar	R. Madhavan, Simran, Sneha, Lawrence Raghavendra	Kavithalayaa Productions	
N O V	14	Shahjahan	Ravi	Vijay, Richa Pallod	Super Good Films	
N O V	14	Thavasi	Udayasankar	Vijayakanth, Soundarya, Jayasudha, Prathyusha	GJ Cinema	
N O V	30	Ponnana Neram	Raviraj	Ramarajan, Prathyusha	Alamelu Pictures	
D E C	7	Azhagana Naatkal	Sundar C.	Karthik, Rambha, Mumtaj	Gowthami Arts	
D E C	14	Kadal Pookkal	Bharathiraja	Murali, Manoj Bharathiraja, Sindhu Menon, Prathyusha, Uma	Sivasakthi Movie Makers	
D E C	14	Kasi	Vinayan	Vikram, Kavya Madhavan, Kaveri	Sunitha Productions	
D E C	14	Kottai Mariamman	Rama Narayanan	Karan, Devayani, Roja	Shyaamala Art Pictures	
D E C	14	Love Marriage	K. Subash	Vikram Krishna, Ranjana	GK Entertainments	
D E C	14	Majunu	Ravichandran	Prashanth, Rinke Khanna, Rati Agnihotri, Sonu Sood	Cee I TV Entertainments	
D E C	21	Vadagupatti Maapillai	V. C. Guhanathan	Hamsavardhan, Reshma, Vivek, Vadivelu	Chitramala Combines	

Other releases

The following films also released in 2001, though the release date remains unknown.

Title	Director	Cast	Studio	Ref
Maname Mayangathe	Shapeer Kumar	Padmaja, Hema, Meenu	Welcome Films	
Theerpugal Maatrapadalaam	M. K. Arunthavaraj	Babu Ganesh, Vichithra	Aum Devalayaa Cine Creations	

== Dubbed films ==
The following films were notable dubbed films also released in 2001.

Opening	Title	Director(s)	Original film		Cast	Ref.
Opening	Title	Director(s)	Film	Language	Cast	Ref.
14 January	Paapa	Kodi Ramakrishna	Devi Putrudu	Telugu	Venkatesh, Soundarya, Anjala Zaveri	
14 January	Unnai Thedi Varuven	K. V. Raju	No. 1	Kannada	Ramkumar, Vijayalakshmi	
14 April	Kuzhanthayum Deivamum	Kodi Ramakrishna	Devullu	Telugu	Babloo Prithviraj, Manthra	
8 June	Chithiram	Teja	Chitram	Telugu	Uday Kiran, Reemma Sen	
26 October	Samrat Asoka	Santhosh Sivan	Asoka	Hindi	Shahrukh Khan, Ajith Kumar, Kareena Kapoor	

== Awards ==
Category/Organization	Cinema Express Awards 14 October 2001	Dinakaran Cinema Awards 22 April 2002	Filmfare Awards South 20 April 2002	Tamil Nadu State Film Awards 30 September 2004
Best Film	Aanandham	Aanandham	Aanandham	Virumbugiren (2002)
Best Director	K. S. Ravikumar; Thenali (2000)	Bala; Nandhaa	Cheran; Pandavar Bhoomi	Susi Ganesan; Virumbugiren (2002)
Best Actor	Ajith Kumar; Citizen	Vikram; Kasi	Vikram; Kasi	Suriya; Nandhaa
Best Actress	Meena; Rhythm (2000)	Laila; Dhill / Nandhaa	Laila; Nandhaa	Sneha; Virumbugiren (2002)
Best Music Director		Harris Jayaraj; Minnale	Harris Jayaraj; Minnale	Vidyasagar; Dhill, Thavasi, Poovellam Un Vasam
