= Priya Nestama =

- CD cover
- Directed by: R. Ganapathi
- Written by: Chintapalli Ramana (dialogues)
- Story by: R. Ganapathi
- Produced by: Ramoji Rao
- Starring: Venu Thottempudi; Shama; Malavika
- Cinematography: K. Prasad
- Edited by: Nandamuri Hari
- Music by: Songs: Bharani; Devi Sri Prasad (1 song); Score: Vidyasagar
- Production company: Usha Kiron Movies
- Release date: 25 January 2002
- Country: India
- Language: Telugu

Priya Nestama (transl. Lovely Friend) is a 2002 Indian Telugu-language romantic drama film directed by R. Ganapathi starring Venu Thottempudi, Shama Sikander and Malavika. The film released to negative reviews and was a box office failure.

== Cast ==
- Venu Thottempudi as Surya
- Shama Sikander as Girija
- Malavika as Pooja
- Sivaji as Kiran
- Tanikella Bharani as Surya's uncle
- Prasad Babu
- Chalapati Rao
- Delhi Rajeswari
- Annapoorna
- Chandra Mohan as Pooja's father
- Bandla Ganesh
- Sadhika

== Production ==
R. Ganapathi made his directorial debut through this film. The film was shot in Ooty on 1 August 2001.

== Soundtrack ==
The songs for the film were composed by Bharani, in his Telugu debut, and Devi Sri Prasad, while the background score was composed by Vidyasagar. The soundtrack was released under the music label Mayuri Audio.

Priya Nestama

Soundtrack album by Bharani and Devi Sri Prasad Background Score: Vidyasagar
- Released: 2002
- Genre: Feature film soundtrack
- Length: 28:39
- Language: Telugu
- Label: Mayuri Audio

Bharani chronology
Paarvai Ondre Pothume (2001)	Priya Nestama (2002)	Charlie Chaplin (2002)

Devi Sri Prasad chronology
Anandam (2001)	Priya Nestama (2002)	Kalusukovalani (2002)

Vidyasagar chronology
O Chinadana (2002)	Priya Nestama (2002)	Neetho (2002)

Track listing
No.	Title	Lyrics	Music	Singer(s)	Length
1.	"Arere Arere Andhagatthero"	Chandrabose	Devi Sri Prasad	Tippu	4:24
2.	"Priya Nesthama Swagatham"	Sirivennela Seetharama Sastry	Bharani	S. P. Balasubrahmanyam	5:01
3.	"Vennelalo Thiragali"	Suddala Ashok Teja	Bharani	Sonu Nigam, Kavita Krishnamurthy	5:04
4.	"Ningi Nela Okatayyela"	Sirivennela Seetharama Sastry	Bharani	S. P. Balasubrahmanyam, Sujatha Mohan	5:41
5.	"Chandamama Painundhee"	Bhuvana Chandra	Bharani	Radhika	5:36
6.	"Komma Meedha Maina Kathavinave"	Chandrabose	Bharani	S. P. Balasubrahmanyam, K. S. Chithra	2:53
Total length:					28:39

== Reception ==
Gudipoodi Srihari of The Hindu wrote that "Yet another love story from Usha Kiron Movies. The script is poor with routine situations" and added that "There is imbalance between the volume of the dialogue and the musical score in the background". A critic from Idlebrain.com wrote that "The movie is pretty boring. There is not even a single scene in the film that captivates the mood of viewers. It's a bad film from that came out of the good banner like Usha Kiron movies. Watch it at your own risk!" A critic from Full Hyderabad wrote that "The clichéd story isn't a fundamental problem (as nothing is original anymore) but everything else is". TeluguCinema wrote "The story line is very weak and unconvincing clubbed with worn out screenplay. It’s difficult to get convinced why people are going for crazy options even when fair and straight means are available. The other drawback in the film is its comedy. There is a comedy track that is again a rotten one. Though all the lead actors and other cast did their bits well there is really nothing in the film that can hold the audience. Even the music is average and the title song is the only one worth mentioning. On the whole the film is a complete flat product".
