= Roja Combines =

Indian film company

- Type: Film production Film distribution
- Industry: Entertainment
- Founded: 1996
- Headquarters: Chennai, India
- Key people: Kaja Mydeen
- Products: Motion pictures (Tamil)

Roja Combines is an Indian film production and distribution company headed by Kaja Mydeen. The film had been a leading production studio in the Tamil film industry in the 1990s, .

== History ==
Roja Combines was launched and run by 1990s – Kaja Mydeen, .

Soon after the surprise success of the adolescent-themed Thulluvadho Ilamai (2002), Roja Combines agreed terms with the film's lead actors Dhanush and Sherin to make a film for the studio during October 2002. A project titled Ennai Mattum Kaadhal Pannu by Boopathy Pandian began thereafter but was later put on hold after Dhanush became busy with other ventures. Eventually, the film was relaunched with Dhanush and Sridevi Vijayakumar as Devathayai Kanden (2005).

In 2003, Roja Combines produced a live stage show in the United Arab Emirates called Tamil Mega Star Night 2003. The studio's collaboration with Ajith Kumar in Jana (2004) In 2005, from producing Gautham Vasudev Menon's Vettaiyaadu Vilaiyaadu (2006) starring Kamal Haasan and chose to release his other ongoing project Perarasu starring Vijayakanth.

In 2010, Kaja Mydeen was approached to act in Sasikumar's Easan, but eventually did not feature. By the mid-2010s, the studio remained largely inactive owing to the rising costs of operating in the Tamil film industry.

== Personal life ==
In July 2005, Kaja stepped into real estate business.And also was an active member of the producer council then..

== Filmography ==
| Title | Year | Language | Director | Cast | Synopsis | Ref. |
|---|---|---|---|---|---|---|
| Gopala Gopala | 1996 | Tamil | Pandiarajan | Pandiarajan, Khushbu | Gopal causes much angst among his male neighbours as he is friendly with their spouses. They are relieved when he marries Usha. But Usha leaves him after learning that he was married once before | |
| Porkkaalam | 1997 | Tamil | Cheran | Murali, Meena, Sanghavi | Murali is a potter by profession and has a sister who is dumb. He wants to get her married to a decent boy but everyone rejects her. In a tragic turn of events, Murali decides to marry a handicapped | |
| Poonthottam | 1998 | Tamil | Kalanjiyam | Murali, Devayani, Raghuvaran | A woman faces threat from her step-brothers who are keen to evict her from their home. Meanwhile, her good for nothing tenant is another problem. But, it is the same tenant who comes to their rescue. | |
| Anantha Poongatre | 1999 | Tamil | Raj Kapoor | Ajith Kumar, Karthik, Meena, Malavika | Jeeva loves Meenakshi, a widow after knowing her past however she isn't interested in marrying him fearing social norms. | |
| Paattali | 1999 | Tamil | K. S. Ravikumar | Sarathkumar, Devayani, Ramya Krishnan | Despite being the sole heir to a large fortune, Shanmugam is forced to work as a servant by his aunt. Later, she forces him to marry her own daughter in order to usurp his wealth. | |
| Sandhitha Velai | 2000 | Tamil | Ravichandran | Karthik, Roja, Kausalya | On a trip, Aadalarasu meets his lookalike and promises to fulfil the latter's request. His look-alike dies and he takes his place in his family while his own family thinks he is dead. | |
| Pennin Manathai Thottu | 2000 | Tamil | Ezhil | Prabhu Deva, Sarathkumar, Jaya Seal | Sunil is a renowned heart surgeon, while Sunita has a kid with a heart problem. When she meets Sunil, she lashes out at him, blaming him for her plight, as he had betrayed her many years ago. | |
| Vaanchinathan | 2001 | Tamil | Shaji Kailas | Vijayakanth, Sakshi Shivanand, Ramya Krishnan | Vaanchinathan, a straightforward policeman, is not allergic to exploiting the loopholes in the law to eliminate the criminals who have thus far not been punished by the judiciary. | |
| Alli Thandha Vaanam | 2001 | Tamil | Sreedhar Prasath | Prabhu Deva, Murali, Laila | An entrepreneur challenges his reckless son, Satyam, to live independently for three months. Satyam's encounters away from home end up changing him as a human being. | |
| Charlie Chaplin | 2002 | Tamil | Sakthi Chidambaram | Prabhu, Prabhu Deva, Abhirami, Gayathri Raghuraman | When Ramakrishnan is caught with a prostitute, he introduces her to his wife as Thiru's girlfriend. Thiru, feeling helpless, goes along with the plan at the cost of upsetting his own girlfriend, Susi. | |
| Samasthanam | 2002 | Tamil | Raj Kapoor | Suresh Gopi, Sarathkumar, Devayani | Thiru and Surya are friends whose relationship has survived many hurdles. But, their bond is broken when a rift is caused due to their respective wives and also a man whose father was killed by Thiru's father. | |
| Jana | 2004 | Tamil | Shaji Kailas | Ajith Kumar, Sneha, Siddique | Jana always stands for his villagers, against the atrocities committed by Veerapandi. Manimegalai, Veerapandi's daughter, falls in love with Jana, but is stunned when she learns about his past life as a gangster in Mumbai. | |
| Devathaiyai Kanden | 2005 | Tamil | Boopathy Pandian | Dhanush, Sridevi Vijayakumar, Kunal | Babu, a tea vendor, falls in love with Uma, a rich girl, and she too loves him for his sincerity. However, Babu sues her for cheating, when she accepts a doctor's proposal to have a secured future. | |
| Perarasu | 2006 | Tamil | Udhayan | Vijayakanth, Debina Bonnerjee, Prakash Raj | CBI officer Kasi is tasked to investigate the disappearance of a judge. He finds out that a minister and three cops are behind it. Soon after, the cops get killed and Kasi is framed for their murders. | |
