= Mahathi =

Indian musician and singer

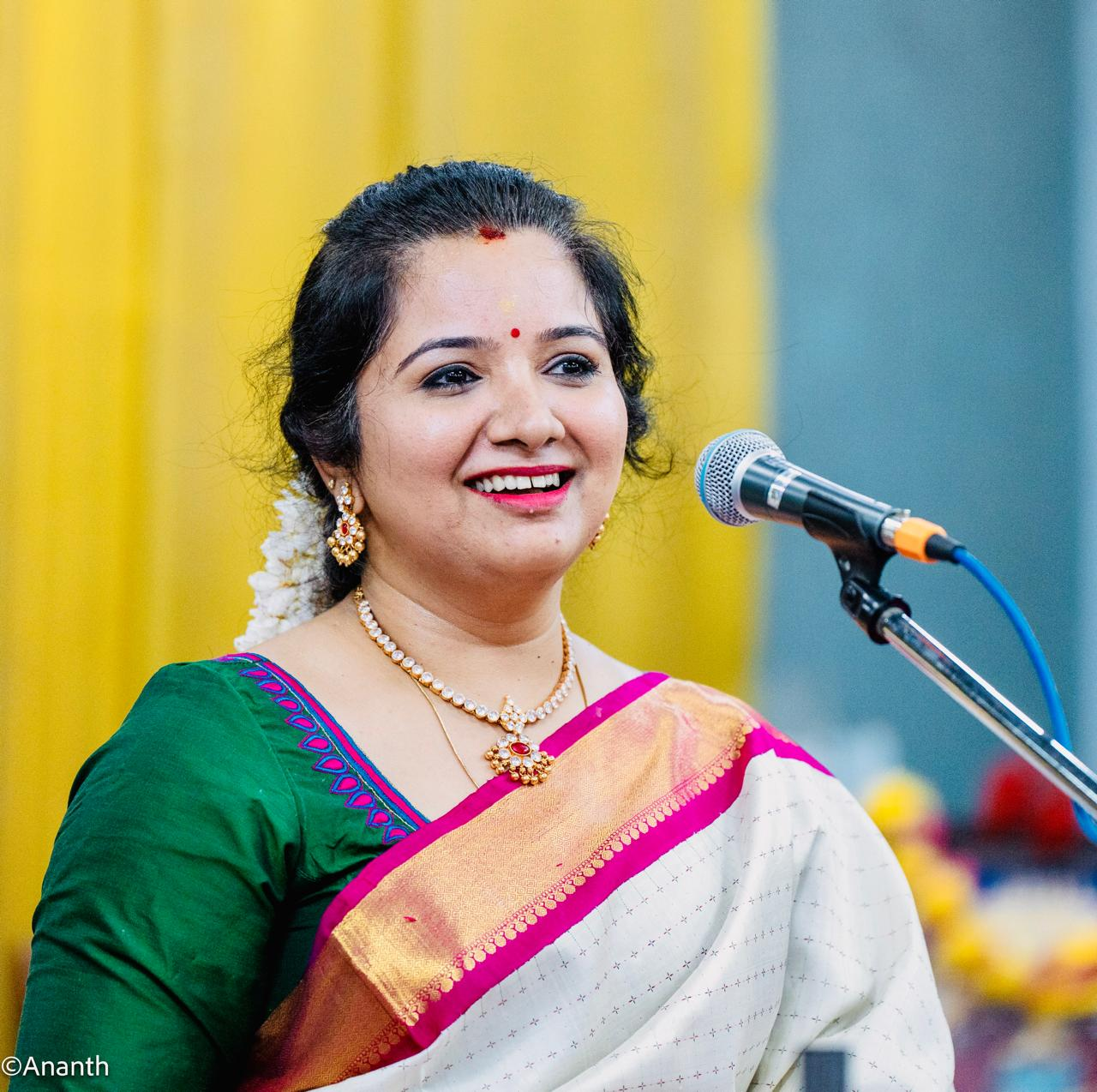
- Mahathi at concert, 2024
- Born: Mahathi Sekar; Chennai, Tamil Nadu, India
- Other names: Mahathy; Mahati
- Occupations: Singer; musician
- Years active: 2003–present
- Spouse: K. Sreekumar (m. 2008)
- Awards: Tamil Nadu State Film Award for Best Female Playback; ITFA Best Female Playback Award
- Musical career
- Genres: Carnatic; Indian classical; Playback singing; Filmi; Bhajan
- Instrument: Vocals

Mahathi is an Indian Carnatic musician and playback singer for film songs in Tamil and Telugu languages.

== Family ==
Mahathi is from a family of musicians. Her father, Thiruvaiyaru P. Sekar, is a vocalist and a disciple of M. Balamuralikrishna. Her mother, Vasanthi Sekar, a flautist, is the grand disciple of T. R. Mahalingam, N. Ramani and Kesi. Mahathi is also the great-granddaughter of the violinist Sangeetha Kalanidhi Pazhamaneri Swaminatha Iyer.

== Career ==
A carnatic musician & playback singer, Mahathi is a child prodigy who started Identifying classical ragas when she was 1.5 years old. Undergoing musical training under her parents Thiruvaiyaru Sekar & Smt. Vasanthi Sekar, she underwent musical training from Smt. Lalitha & Gayatri at trivandrum, Underwent advanced musical training from Sangeetha Kala Acharya Late Mangad Natesan & Padma Bhushan Awardee Madurai Shri T N Seshagopalan.

Mahathi is a prominent playback singer in South Indian Languages. She was introduced to playback singing by Isaignani Ilayaraja in the movie Kadhal Jathi in 2001.

== Playback singing ==
Mahathi started playback singing in 2003 with a duet, "Iyyaiyyo Pudichirukku", with Hariharan, under the music direction of Harris Jayaraj in movie, Saamy. In 2008, Mahathi won the Tamil Nadu State Film Award for Best Female Playback Singer for the song "Nenje Nenje" from the movie Ayan.

== Discography ==
All songs in Tamil unless specified otherwise.

| Year | Film | Song | Composer | Co-singer(s) |
|---|---|---|---|---|
| 2003 | Saamy | "Pudichirukku" | Harris Jayaraj | Hariharan |
| 2003 | Sindhamal Sitharamal | "Vaanavillin" | Bharani | Unnikrishnan |
| 2004 | Kovil | "Puyalae Puyalae" | Harris Jayaraj | Karthik |
| 2004 | Chellamae | "Kadhalikum Aasai" | Harris Jayaraj | KK, Chinmayi, Timmy |
| 2004 | Chellamae | "Vellaikara Mutham" | Harris Jayaraj | |
| 2004 | Varnajaalam | "Nee Vendum" | Vidyasagar | Karthik |
| 2004 | Jathi | "Vennila Kangalil" | Agni Kalaivani | Srinivas |
| 2004 | Oru Murai Sollividu | "Kattunaakka Ivala Kattu" | Bharadwaj | Karthik |
| 2004 | Dreams | "Appa Amma" | Bharadwaj | Nithish Gopalan, Ranjith |
| 2004 | Jananam | "Pidivadham Pidikathae" | Bharadwaj | Ranjith |
| 2004 | Meesai Madhavan | "Kottu Kottu" | Bharani | Manikka Vinayagam |
| 2005 | Sevvel | "Sutti Penne" | Aasan | Karthik |
| 2005 | Alaiyadikkuthu | "Chee Chee Poda" | Bharani | Harish Raghavendra |
| 2005 | Alaiyadikkuthu | "Machi Machi" | Bharani | |
| 2005 | ABCD | "Yengo Yengo" | D. Imman | Haricharan |
| 2005 | Thirudiya Idhayathai | "Monalisa" | Bharani | |
| 2005 | Ambuttu Imbuttu Embuttu | "Vaarai Nee Vaarai" | Dhina | T. L. Maharajan |
| 2005 | Ambuttu Imbuttu Embuttu | "Adiyea Ammu" | Dhina | Shankar Mahadevan |
| 2006 | Nee Venunda Chellam | "Ennada Athisayam" | Dhina | Jassie Gift |
| 2006 | Nee Venunda Chellam | "Eppadiyum" | Dhina | Silambarasan |
| 2006 | Kumaran | "Bayla Baylamo" | Harris Jayaraj | V. V. Prasanna |
| 2006 | Suyetchai MLA | "Puli Varuthu Puli Varuthu" | Sabesh–Murali | |
| 2006 | Varalaaru | "Innisai" | A. R. Rahman | Saindhavi, Naresh Iyer |
| 2006 | Vallavan | "Yammadi Aathadi" | Yuvan Shankar Raja | T. Rajendar, Suchitra, Silambarasan |
| 2006 | Parijatham | "Ennil Ennil Nee" | Dharan | |
| 2006 | Uyir | "Aarum Ponnum" | Joshua Sridhar | Joshua Sridhar, Shalini |
| 2006 | Uyir | "Kann Simittum Nerame" | Joshua Sridhar | Haricharan, Shalini |
| 2007 | Nee Naan Nila | "Oyyalae" | Dhina | Silambarasan |
| 2007 | Thoovanam | "SMSla Kadhal" | Isaac Thomas Kottukapally | Naresh Iyer, Vinaya, Sathyan |
| 2007 | Maharathi | "Maja Maja" (Telugu) | Gurukiran | Udit Narayan |
| 2007 | Mudhal Kanave | "Mudhal Mudhal" | Srikanth Deva | |
| 2007 | Achacho | "Pengal" | M. K. S. Narula Khan | Unni Menon |
| 2007 | Achacho | "Paathugoda" | M. K. S. Narula Khan | Tippu |
| 2007 | Paali | "Unnai Paathadum" | Bhagwat | Karthik |
| 2008 | Bheema | "Mudhal Mazhai" | Harris Jayaraj | Hariharan, R. Prasanna |
| 2008 | Homam | "Katti Naaku Gucchadammo" (Telugu) | Nithin Raikwar | |
| 2008 | Satyam | "Paal Pappaali" | Harris Jayaraj | Naveen |
| 2008 | Vaazhthugal | "Enthan Vaanamum Neethan" | Yuvan Shankar Raja | Haricharan |
| 2008 | Muniyandi Vilangial Moonramandu | "Potta Kuruviyo" | Vidyasagar | Haricharan |
| 2008 | Nenjathai Killadhe | "Naera Varattuma" | Premgi Amaren | V. V. Prasanna |
| 2008 | Seval | "Namma Ooru Nallaarukku" | G. V. Prakash Kumar | Tippu, Manikka Vinayagam, Anuradha Sriram, Shreya Ghoshal, Prashanthini |
| 2009 | Ayan | "Nenje Nenje" | Harris Jayaraj | Harish Raghavendra |
| 2009 | Oru Kadhalan Oru Kadhali | "Galagalagalappa" | Bharani | Tippu |
| 2009 | Anthony Yaar? | "Kai Thattamal" | Dhina | |
| 2009 | Mariyadhai | "Inbamay" | Vijay Antony | Udit Narayan |
| 2009 | Pokkisham | "Ulagam Ninaivil Illai" | Sabesh–Murali | Prasanna |
| 2010 | Nellu | "Muthu Muthu" | S. S. Kumaran | S. S. Kumaran, Yash Golcha |
| 2011 | Osthe | "Neduvaali" | S. Thaman | Rahul Nambiar |
| 2011 | Vellore Maavattam | "Unnai Unnai" | Sundar C Babu | Krish |
| 2011 | Engeyum Kadhal | "Thee Illai" | Harris Jayaraj | Naresh Iyer, Mukesh Mohamed, Gopal Rao, Ranina Reddy |
| 2011 | Potta Potti | "Iduvarai Iduvarai" | Aruldev | Hariharan, Aruldev |
| 2012 | Kadhal Paathai | "Ennavo Nenjiley" | S. S. Kumaran | |
| 2012 | Ullam | "Kannai Thiranthu" | Yuvan Shankar Raja | Karthik |
| 2012 | Kantha | "Uyar Thiru Kadhal" | Shakthi R. Selva | Haricharan |
| 2014 | Ra Ra Krishnayya | "Seetha Kalyanam" (Telugu) | Achu Rajamani | |
| 2014 | Theriyama Unna Kadhalichitten | "Nelavukum Naanum Perakkum" | P. R. Srinath | Rahul Nambiar |
| 2014 | Vetri Selvan | "Enna Enna" | Mani Sharma | Haricharan |
| 2015 | Yennai Arindhaal | "Unakkenna Venum Sollu" | Harris Jayaraj | Benny Dayal |
| 2015 | Killadi | "Nee Rangikkari" | Srikanth Deva | Velmurugan |
| 2015 | Achaaram | "Perazhagai" | Srikanth Deva | Sooraj Santhosh |
| 2016 | Angali Pangali | "Nee Nee Neeyanai" | Srikanth Deva | Haricharan |
| 2016 | Natpadhigaram 79 | "Penne Nee Kadhal" | Deepak Nilambar | Yazin Nizar |
| 2019 | Dev | "She Is My Girl" | Harris Jayaraj | Haricharan, Christopher Stanley |
| 2021 | Vanji Aval Pearazhagi | "Vanji Aval Pearazhagi" (independent song) | Gersan | Sam Vishal |

== Television works ==
Mahathi presented the music based quiz program, "Aaha Paadalam" on Doordarshan Podhigai TV with Raaghav. In October 2005 she presented Ilaiyaraja's Live-in Concert organised by Jaya TV, "Andrum Indrum Endrum" with actor Parthiban.

== Titles, awards, and other recognition ==
- 2008, Tamil Nadu State Film Award for Best Female Playback (for "Naeraa Varattuma" from Nenjathai Killadhe)
- 2009, Isai Aruvi Film Award – “Mudhal Mazhai”
- 2008, ITFA Best Female Playback Award (for "Mudhal Mazhai" from Bheema)
- 2011, "The Chord Wizard" (title), WE Magazine, Chennai, India
- 2009, Tamil Nadu State Film Award for Best Female Playback (for "Nenje Nenje" from Ayan)
- An “A” grade artist of the All India Radio / Doordarshan in 2020
- 2023, “Isai Chelvam” conferred by Muthamizh Peravai – from the honourable chief minister of Tamilnadu Thiru M.K Stalin
- 2006, Innisai Ilayavani
- 2017, ISAI PEROLI - Kartik Fine Arts
- 2015, G.Ramanathan Award – Sri Parthsarathy swamy sabha Chennai
- 2011, Yuva kala Bharathi – Bharath Kalachar
- 2016, Vani Kala Nipuna – Thyaga Brahma Gana Sabha
- 2018, Madras Music Academy – Best Pallavi Prize
- 2024, Raga Chathura Bhushani – Rotary Club Chennai
