= Perianna =

- Poster
- Directed by: S. A. Chandrasekharan
- Written by: Suresh K. (dialogues)
- Screenplay by: S. A. Chandrasekharan
- Story by: Suresh K.
- Produced by: Jaya; S. K. Subbiah
- Starring: Suriya; Meena; Manasa
- Cinematography: Selva. R
- Edited by: Saleem-Vasu
- Music by: Bharani
- Production company: Jaya Subhashree Productions
- Release date: 14 April 1999
- Running time: 148 minutes
- Country: India
- Language: Tamil

Perianna (spelt onscreen as Periannaha) is a 1999 Indian Tamil-language action drama film directed by S. A. Chandrasekharan, starring Suriya, Meena and Manasa with Vijayakanth in an extended cameo role as the title character. The soundtrack for this film was composed by debutant music director Bharani. The film was released on 14 April 1999.

== Plot ==
Suriya kills the villains who murder his family and is sent to jail. During his time in jail, a well-respected minister celebrates his daughter's birthday in prison. His daughter is impressed by Suriya's talent in Violin percussion and convinces her father to grant her special permission to learn music from him. During this time, they fall in love with each other, and opposition grows from the girl's parents and the police department. Then, they elope. They come to a remote town where they witness the murder of a collector in the railway station during broad daylight, but no one seems to care. They then see that the man who murdered the collector is the chief of the village, Periyanna, so they try to oppose him. In their time at the village, they learn about his past and change their mind about him. He promises them to get them married. The movie then moves towards the climax as whether the village chief will be successful in getting those two lovers married or the girl's father will be successful in separating them by using the legal system against them.

== Cast ==
- Vijayakanth as Lingam (Periyanna) (Extended guest appearance)
- Suriya as Suriya
- Meena as Shenbagam
- Manasa as Ganga
- Devan as Varadharajan
- Anandaraj
- Manorama
- Manivannan
- R. Sundarrajan
- Vinu Chakravarthy
- Ajay Rathnam as Collector
- O.A.K. Sundar
- Sachu
- Vaiyapuri as Prisoner
- S. S. Chandran
- Thalapathi Dinesh
- Ram Lakshman
- Rocky Rajesh as Henchman (special appearance)

== Production ==
S. A. Chandrasekhar had initially planned to make the film with Vijayakanth and Vijay, but the project failed to materialise. The film re-emerged in 1998 with Vijay's busy schedules for his other films prompting Chandrasekhar to select Suriya to appear in a lead role alongside Vijayakanth. Meena was selected to play a leading role in the film. Chandrasekhar initially picked a model from Mumbai called Tanuja to be paired opposite Suriya, but later changed his mind. The role was handed to Ganga, sister of actress Easwari Rao, with the director changing her stage name to Manasa from Ganga as she was known in Kaakai Siraginilae. Vijayakanth's long-time assistant, S. K. Subbiah, produced the film, with Vijayakanth keen to work on the venture in order to help benefit Subbiah.

The film was launched in late 1998 with Vijayakanth, Suriya, director Chandrasekhar and veteran producers A. L. Azhagappan and Ibrahim Rowther in attendance. Vijayakanth charged no remuneration for his work.

== Soundtrack ==
Perianna

Soundtrack album by Bharani
- Released: January 1999
- Genre: Feature film soundtrack
- Length: 31:59
- Language: Tamil

Bharani chronology
Perianna (1999)	Paarvai Ondre Podhume (2001)

Bharani who earlier wrote lyrics for Vijay's debut film Naalaya Theerpu (1992) was selected to compose the music thus making his debut. The soundtrack contains 7 songs and lyrics for the songs were written by Bharani, Vasan, Arivumathi and Pulamaipithan.

Actor Vijay had sung three songs for Suriya in this film. "Naam Dum Adikkira" song was well received while another song "Nilave Nilave" was also successful. This marked Vijay's first and only time singing in a film without his own star presence.

Bollywood actress, singer, and VJ Raageshwari recorded a female version of the song "Rottula Oru Chinnaponnu," which was intended to be part of the film's audio soundtrack and her debut Tamil song; however, it has never included in the final theatrical and soundtrack film release.

Track listing
No.	Title	Lyrics	Singer(s)	Length
1.	"Nilave Nilave"	Vasan	Hariharan, Sujatha Mohan	5:03
2.	"Naan Dum Adikkira Styla Pathu"	Bharani	Vijay	4:21
3.	"Juttadi Leela Sundara Mala"	Bharani	Vijay, Swarnalatha	4:45
4.	"Pollachi Mala Rottula"	Pulamaipithan	Malaysia Vasudevan, Swarnalatha, S. N. Surendar	5:47
5.	"Rottula Oru Chinnaponnu"	Bharani	Vijay	4:13
6.	"Pacholay Keethukulla"	Arivumathi	S. P. Balasubrahmanyam, K.S. Chithra	4:35
7.	"Nilave Nilave" (pathos)	Vasan	S. N. Surendar	3:15
Total length:				31:59

== Release and reception ==
The film released on 14 April 1999, and was a box office failure. K. N. Vijiyan of New Straits Times called it "not a must-see movie". K. P. S. of Kalki wrote Chandrasekhar has shot a film in the collaboration of Vijayakanth and Suriya and is eager to score a century. He has given a catch to the fans with the usual, old story and ducked out. D. S. Ramanujam of The Hindu wrote, "In building the story of K. Suresh, who had also written the dialogue, through his screenplay, the director leaves a few vacant areas".
