= Thirudiya Idhayathai =

- Title card
- Directed by: Murali Krishna
- Written by: Murali Krishna
- Produced by: Rohan Salian
- Starring: Rohan Salian; Kunal; Shubha Poonja
- Cinematography: Rajarajan
- Edited by: P. Sai Suresh
- Music by: Bharani
- Production company: Madhuban Productions
- Release date: 14 October 2005
- Running time: 107 minutes
- Country: India
- Language: Tamil

Thirudiya Idhayathai (transl. The stolen heart) is a 2005 Indian Tamil-language romantic action film written and directed by Murali Krishna. It stars producer Rohan Salian, Kunal and Shubha Poonja. The score and soundtrack were composed by Bharani. The film's title is based on a song from Paarvai Ondre Pothume, also starring Kunal.

== Cast ==
- Rohan Salian as Arun
- Kunal as Ganesh
- Shubha Poonja as Haritha
- Brinda Parekh
- Ramji as Victor
- Nizhalgal Ravi
- Sathyajith
- Ganja Karuppu
- Seshu
- Fathima Babu

== Production ==
The film saw actor Kunal reuniting with director Murali Krishna after Paarvai Ondre Podhume (2001). Rohan, the then boyfriend of actress Sherin, made his film debut in another leading role. The entire film was shot within seventeen days. The shoot of the film was completed by September 2004, with a press meet held at Quality Inn Aruna in Chennai to mark the end of the shoot.

== Soundtrack ==
The soundtrack was composed by Bharani.

Track listing
| No. | Title | Singer(s) | Length |
|---|---|---|---|
| 1. | "Ithanai Nalaai" | Harish Raghavendra |
| 2. | "Onnu Rendu" | Murali Krishna |
| 3. | "Podhathu Podhathu" | Krishnaraj, Srimathumitha |
| 4. | "Konjum" | Kalpana, P. Unnikrishnan |
| 5. | "Monalisa" | Mahathi |

== Release and reception ==
S. R. Ashok Kumar of The Hindu opined that "Murali Krishna has wasted a good opportunity by doing a half-baked project. He should have worked more on the screenplay. Both dialogue and direction leave much to be desired". Malini Mannath from Chennai Online noted, "there's nothing fresh or exciting here in script or narration", adding that Rohan has a "long way to go by way of emoting". A reviewer from Siliconeer noted that the film was "old wine in an old bottle".
