= Murali Krishna (director) =

Indian film director

- Occupation: Director
- Years active: 2001–present

Murali Krishna is an Indian film director who has worked on Tamil language films. He is best known for making romantic films in the early 2000s, and gained acclaim for Paarvai Ondre Podhume (2001).

== Career ==
Murali Krishna made his directorial debut with the romantic film Paarvai Ondre Pothume (2001) featuring Kunal (the lead actor of film Kadhalar Dhinam) and Monal (the younger sister of actress Simran). The success of this film prompted the trio to reunite for another film titled Pesadha Kannum Pesume (2002). The second film received negative reviews, with a critic stating it "continues long after it should have ended. There is not much by way of performances either". In 2002, he began production on a project titled Endrum Unnai Nesippen starring Karthik and Haripriya in the lead roles. The film eventually failed to materialise owing to Karthik's off-screen problems. His third film, Thirudiya Idhayathai (2005) featured Kunal in the lead role again with newcomers Rohan and Shubha Poonja.

He then worked on the romance film, Balam (2009) with a lead pair of newcomers, which opened to negative reviews. A critic from Rediff.com criticised the director for failing to make use of experienced artistes like Rahman, Suhasini and Santhanam in the film. Murali Krishna then worked as the director and music composer on a film titled Karvam and then on Thuttu featuring Aryan Rajesh and despite having an audio release function in April 2013, the films remain unreleased.

In 2015, Murali Krishna was revealed to be working on a project titled Mirantavan starring Prajin and Manochitra, a tale on blackmail featuring seven actresses.

== Filmography ==
Year	Film	Notes
2001	Paarvai Ondre Podhume	
2002	Pesadha Kannum Pesume	
2005	Thirudiya Idhayathai	
2009	Balam	Cameo appearance
2016	Ner Mugam	Also music director
