= Neeku Naaku =

Neeku Naaku Oru Kadhalan Oru Kadhali
- Directed by: Selvendran
- Written by: Radha Krishnan
- Produced by: Sai Rathnam
- Starring: Sarath Chander; Rambha; Lakshmi Rai
- Cinematography: B. Thivaakar
- Edited by: B. S. Vasu - Saleem
- Music by: Bharani
- Production company: Sri Sarva Sai Films
- Release dates: 27 October 2006 (Telugu); 25 September 2009 (Tamil)
- Country: India
- Languages: Telugu; Tamil

Neeku Naaku (transl. For you, for me) is a bilingual drama film, written and directed by Selvendran and produced by Sai Rathnam in Telugu and Tamil. The film stars Sarath Chander, Rambha and Lakshmi Rai. Music for the film was composed by Bharani and while the Telugu version released in October 2006, the Tamil version Oru Kadhalan Oru Kadhali (transl. A boyfriend and a girlfriend) was released in September 2009.

== Cast ==
- Sarath Chander as Charan
- Rambha as Lakshmi
- Lakshmi Rai as Saranya
- Abhinayashree as Lakshmi
- R. Sundarrajan
- Giri Babu / Manobala as Ramaiah
- Thalaivasal Vijay
- Ponnambalam as Lingesu
- Brahmanandam / Vennira Aadai Moorthy as the college professor
- Anu Mohan
- Telangana Shakuntala
- Keerthana
- Bakya
- Kavitha
- Rajashree as Sumathi
- Kadhal Sukumar as College student
- Suman Setty as College student
- Babloo as College student
- Rajyalakshmi as Charan's mother (uncredited)

== Production ==
The director of the film, Selvendran, who had previously worked under director Shankar for Kaadhalan, Indian and Jeans, made his directorial debut with the project. The film marked a comeback for actress Rambha after a period away from Tamil films, and she signed on to star in the film in early 2005.

== Soundtrack ==
The film's soundtrack was composed by Bharani, with lyrics written by Kabilan.

Tamil version

- Galagalagalappa - Mahathi, Tippu
- Maama Maama - Ranjith, Gayatri
- Yei Thagathaga - Suchitra
- Thiruttu Payalae - Saindhavi
- Muddulagumma Maddulagumma - Reshmi

== Release ==
Oru Kadhalan Oru Kadhali was released on 25 September 2009 alongside five other films, and it was a box office failure, eventually pushing the director into poverty.
