= Nan Love Track =

- Directed by: Kathir
- Written by: Kathir
- Produced by: B. N. Krishnamurthy; Naveen Sharma
- Starring: Rakshith Gowda; Nidhi Kushalappa
- Cinematography: Omar
- Edited by: Bala - Sujai S J
- Music by: Shyam-Prasanna-Praveen
- Production company: JK Enterprises
- Release date: 19 February 2016
- Running time: 123 minutes
- Language: Kannada

Nan Love Track (transl. My Love Track) is a 2016 Indian Kannada language romance film directed by Kathir, in his Kannada debut The film stars newcomers Rakshith Gowda and Nidhi Kushalappa in the lead roles.

== Cast ==
- Rakshith Gowda (credited as "Rakku") as Ram
- Nidhi Kushalappa
- Vasishta N. Simha as Raaj
- Achyuth Kumar
- Manoj Kumar
- Sudha Belawadi
- Siddhu
- Anand

== Production ==
The muhurat took place on 2 June 2014. The film's director, Kathir, returned to direction through this film after taking a hiatus. He was previously scripting an unreleased film about Gandhi and accepted this film during a break period he was on. Rakshith Gowda, known for his role as Vijay from the television series Amruthavarshini, rechristened himself as Rakku for the film. Niveditha "Nidhi" Kushalappa from Mangalore made her debut through this film. Shyam Prasanna and Praveen, who previously worked as assistants to A. R. Rahman scored the music for the film. Rahman had worked on almost all of Kathir's previous films. Omar from London worked as the film's cinematographer. Kathir based the film's theme on two people he saw when going to the park everyday, who would go there just to have fun. To promote the film, the film cast and crew went to remote locations in northern Karnataka and organized quiz competitions for college students.

== Soundtrack ==
Nan Love Track

Soundtrack album by Shyam Prasanna Praveen
- Genre: Feature film soundtrack
- Language: Kannada
- Label: Lahari Music

The music for the film and soundtracks are composed by newcomer trio Shyam-Prasanna-Praveen. The album has five soundtracks.

Track listing
No.	Title	Lyrics	Singer(s)	Length
1.	"Olave Nannolave"	Dr. Mamatha	Haricharan
2.	"Friendship"	Jayanth Kaikini	Vijay Prakash
3.	"Naadu Beediyalli"	Jayanth Kaikini	Vijay Yesudas
4.	"Hrudayaane"	Kaviraj	Krishna Iyer, Sakthisree Gopalan
5.	"Olave Nannolave (sad)"	Dr. Mamatha	Haricharan

== Reception ==
Sunayana Suresh of The Times of India rated the film 1.5/5 stars and wrote, "The script, too, falls flat at most times. It is a mix of the friendship part of Kadhal Desam and the college rivalry and sports bit from Jo Jeeta Wohi Sikandar, narrated at the pace of an 80s Malayalam art film. The climax could go down as one of the most ridiculous ones seen in 2016 in Sandalwood".
