= Jana (film) =

2004 film directed by Shaji Kailas

- Theatrical release poster
- Directed by: Shaji Kailas
- Written by: B. Unnikrishnan
- Produced by: M. Kaja Mohideen; K. Ayesha
- Starring: Ajith Kumar; Sneha; Siddique
- Cinematography: Rajeev Ravi
- Edited by: L. Bhoominathan
- Music by: Songs: Dhina; Background score C. Rajamani
- Production company: Roja Combines
- Release date: 1 May 2004
- Running time: 168 minutes
- Country: India
- Language: Tamil

Jana (also spelt as Janaa) (Note: Spelt as Janaa on the title card) is a 2004 Indian Tamil-language action film directed by Shaji Kailas and produced by Roja Combines. The film stars Ajith Kumar, Siddique and Sneha. The soundtrack and musical score were composed by Dhina and C. Rajamani, while cinematography and editing were handled by Rajeev Ravi and L. Bhoominathan respectively. It was released on 1 May 2004 and performed poorly at the box office.

== Plot ==
Janarthanan alias Jana lives in a village in Tamil Nadu. In an unforeseen circumstance, Jana meets his former rival Viswanathan Bhandari, who wants to exact revenge against Jana for his brother's death, and it is revealed that Jana was a former vigilante at Mumbai with an expertise in computer science. Jana learns that Bhandari and his brother tried to smuggle arms and ammunitions, where Jana kills Bhandari's brother in the process. An enraged Bhandari exacts revenge on Jana by killing his family with his uncle and father as the only survivor. A fight ensues in which Jana finally finishes Bhandari.

== Cast ==
- Ajith Kumar as Janarthanan "Jana"
- Siddique as Viswanathan Bhandari
- Sneha as Manimegalai
- Manoj K. Jayan as ACP Rajasekar IPS, Jana's brother
- Raghuvaran as Jana's father
- Srividya as Jana's mother
- Radha Ravi as Sankarapandi
- Sathyapriya as Mahalakshmi
- Bindu Panicker as Jana's sister
- Vijayan as Salim Bhai
- Ilavarasu as Jana's brother-in-law
- Latha as Jana's aunt
- Manivannan as Manimegalai's uncle
- Sindhu as Deivanai
- Manorama as Manimegalai's grandmother
- Karunas as Tappa
- Baburaj as Chinnapandi
- Vinu Chakravarthy as MLA
- Rajan P. Dev as a minister
- Delhi Ganesh as Saminathan
- Ponnambalam as Inspector
- Riyaz Khan as Bhandari's brother
- Vaiyapuri as Jana's servant
- Thyagu as Balu, a school attender
- Raviraj as a restaurant owner (uncredited)
- Japan Kumar (uncredited appearance in the song "Thakathimi Thakathimi")

== Production ==
The film was announced in early 2002 titled as Thiruda. Trisha Krishnan was initially signed as the lead actress, though she later pulled out and was replaced by Sneha. The title was subsequently changed to Jana and Ajith began filming in December 2002. The shooting took place at Palghat, where some sets were erected. It was a lavish set costing ₹9 lakh, consisting of two bungalows, one belonging to Raghuvaran and the other to Radha Ravi, in the film. The sets were designed by art director Maniraj. Apart from Palghat, a 20-day schedule took place at Ottappalam and Shornoor in Kerala.

== Soundtrack ==
The soundtrack was composed by Dhina.

Track listing
No.	Title	Lyrics	Singer(s)	Length
1.	"Konjam Uravinayum"	Snehan	Shankar Mahadevan	4:25
2.	"Oru Vanamai"	Kabilan	S. P. Balasubrahmanyam	3:27
3.	"Pothuva Palaruku"	V. Elango	Anuradha Sriram, Karthik	4:13
4.	"Poochandi Vanthutta"	Pa. Vijay	Sunitha Sarathy	3:44
5.	"Thakathimi Thakathimi"	Pa. Vijay	Tippu	3:38
6.	"Thithi Thidavae"	Yugabharathi	Bombay Jayashri	4:34
Total length:				24:01

== Reception ==
=== Critical response ===
Visual Dasan of Kalki called it a comforting victory film for Ajith. Sify wrote "Neither great nor ghastly Jana packs in a sting but ends with a whimper and is strictly for the no-holds barred Ajith addicts". Malathi Rangarajan of The Hindu wrote, "A little of Nayakan and a lot of [Baashha] peppered with some originality in screenplay, a ravishing heroine and an invincible hero make up this summer cocktail". Malini Mannath of Chennai Online wrote "One sees the movie and comes out of the theatre with an unclear picture of what it was all about. We carry only the memory of some hotch-potch situations, and a handsome protagonist caught in the midst of it!".

=== Box office ===
Jana was released on 1 May 2004. The film performed poorly at the Chennai box office during its opening week, which the trade blamed on an unexpected monsoon limiting audiences. Attention towards the forthcoming elections in Tamil Nadu was also expected to affect the film's performance.
