= Alaiyadikkuthu =

- Directed by: Kalimuthu Arjunaraja
- Written by: Kalimuthu Arjunaraja
- Produced by: A. N. A. Naina Mohamed; N. Fazil
- Starring: Sindhu Tolani; Yugendran; Naveen Dhanush; Akhil Kumar
- Cinematography: Pavan Shekhar
- Edited by: T. K. Kuppusamy
- Music by: Bharani
- Production company: Studio Lights
- Release date: 10 August 2005
- Country: India
- Language: Tamil

Alaiyadikkuthu (transl. The waves are hitting) is a 2005 Indian Tamil-language thriller film written and directed by Kalimuthu Arjunaraja and starring Sindhu Tolani, Naveen Dhanush and Akhil Kumar. It was released on 10 August 2005.

== Cast ==
- Sindhu Tolani as Brindha
- Naveen Dhanush
- Akhil Kumar
- Yugendran as R. G. Madhu
- Anand
- Kazan Khan
- Vennira Aadai Moorthy
- Ghilli Sekhar
- Bava Lakshmanan
- Neha Tolani
- Prabha Reddy
- Vijayan
- Rami Reddy
- Kovai Senthil

== Soundtrack ==
No.	Song	Singers	Lyrics
1	Chee Chee Poda	Mahathi, Harish Raghavendra	Ilayakamban
2	Machi Machi	Tippu, Mahathi	Ilayakamban
3	Mela Paaru	Karthik, Grace Karunas	Ilayakamban
4	Mercury Baby	Srimathumitha	Pa. Vijay
5	Vaada Machan	Krishnaraj, Anuradha Sriram	Victor Dass

== Reception ==
The film was released on 10 August 2005 across Tamil Nadu. A critic from Sify gave the film a negative review, adding that "Sindhu Tolani as the female crusader and vigilante is adequate though she has to improve in emotional scenes" and that the film "needed more sensitive treatment". A critic from NowRunning.com wrote "though the movie is realistic, relevant and to some extent revitalizing, it misses on a point that you do not feel or sympathize for the pains suffered by victims of lascivious men".
