= Enge Enadhu Kavithai =

- DVD cover
- Directed by: Puvi N. Aravinth
- Written by: Puvi N. Aravinth
- Produced by: Ashok K. Kotwani
- Starring: Kunal; Krishna Abhishek; Rathi
- Cinematography: N. Om Prakash
- Edited by: Pon Moorthy
- Music by: Bharadwaj
- Production company: Ashco Media Arts
- Release date: 31 May 2002
- Running time: 135 minutes
- Country: India
- Language: Tamil

Enge Enadhu Kavithai (transl. Where is my poem?) is a 2002 Indian Tamil-language romantic drama film directed by N. Aravinth. The film stars Kunal in the main lead role alongside Krishna Abhishek, Sriman and Rathi, while Nizhalgal Ravi and Manivannan also appear in supporting roles. Featuring music composed by Bharadwaj, the film was released to a mixed response in May 2002. The film's title is based on a song from Kandukondain Kandukondain (2000). This is Kunal and Manivannan's second collaboration after Kadhalar Dhinam (1999).

Enge Enadhu Kavithai released on 31 May 2002. It became a commercial failure.

== Cast ==
- Kunal as Babu
- Krishna Abhishek as Krishna
- Rathi as Kavitha
- Ashwini
- Sriman as Bhaskar
- Nizhalgal Ravi as Rangarajan
- Manivannan
- Dhamu as Senthil
- M. S. Viswanathan as Krishna's and Rangarajan's father
- Alex
- Sindhu
- Yugendran as Auto driver (Special appearance)

== Production ==
The film marked the acting debut of Krishna Abhishek, a nephew of the Hindi film actor Govinda. The film also marked the directorial debut of Aravind who earlier worked as assistant director in films produced by Kamal Haasan. The filming was held at Coimbatore, Udumalai, Pollachi and Gobichettipalayam.

== Soundtrack ==
Soundtrack was composed by Bharadwaj, with lyrics written by Snehan.

Song	Singers
"Aararivu Manushanukku"	S. P. Balasubrahmanyam
"Aayiram Aandugal"	Reshmi, Srinivas
"Irumanam Sernthu"	P. Unnikrishnan
"Naan Thediya Kavithai"	Bharadwaj, Sujatha
"Pattu Nirathil"	Bharadwaj, Tippu
"Unnai Paarthal"	Sheela Raman

== Release and reception ==
Tulika of Rediff.com wrote that the film "ambles on in an amateurish way". Malini Mannath of Chennai Online wrote that "the earlier few scenes giving an impression that there is something to look forward to from the debutant director. But soon it turns into a predictable love triangle, with clichéd scenes, and a hasty unconvincing ending to boot". Although Krishna Abhishek got offers to do more films in Tamil, he decided to act in Hindi films starting with Yeh Kaisi Mohabbat, which had the same producer as this film.
