= Madipakkam Madhavan =

- மடிப்பாக்கம் மாதவன்
- Genre: Soap opera Comedy; Drama
- Written by: Cine Star Media
- Directed by: S.Mohan
- Starring: Ramji; Madhumitha; Nalini
- Country of origin: India
- Original language: Tamil
- No. of seasons: 1
- No. of episodes: 458

Production
- Camera setup: Multi-camera
- Running time: approx. 20-22 minutes per episode
- Production company: Cine Star Media

Original release
- Network: Kalaignar TV (2013-2015) re-telecast Kalaignar TV (2023-present)
- Release: 21 October 2013 – 30 October 2015

Madipakkam Madhavan (Tamil: மடிப்பாக்கம் மாதவன்) is a 2013 Indian Tamil-language comedy soap opera that aired on Kalaignar TV from on Monday through Saturday at 21:00 IST. The show stars by Ramji, Madhumitha, Nalini Harshitha and produced by Cine Star Media and director by S.Mohan. It ended its run on 30 October 2015 after airing 458 episodes.

== Plot ==
The story is based on a man having his mother and wife in the house. They fight on a regular basis, and sometimes his mother shouts without reason and starts an unwanted quarrel.

== Cast ==
- Ramji as Madhavan
- Madhumitha as Kausalya Madhavan
- Nalini as Pandari Bai and Rayalaseema Ramulamma (from episode 301 - 306)
- Kathadi Ramamurthy as Kulothungan
- Shanthi Anand as Janaki
- R.Srimati as Savatri mami alis OC Mami
- Sheva Raj as Columbus
- Bharathi Kannan as Vasudevan
- Sumangali as Kausalya's mother

=== Guest stars ===
- Monica
- Minnal Deepa
