= Pesadha Kannum Pesume =

2002 Indian film by Murali Krishna

- DVD cover
- Directed by: Murali Krishna
- Written by: Murali Krishna
- Produced by: Kathir Seveal; V. Jeevanadan; R. Chandrasekhar; C. Chiranjeevi
- Starring: Kunal; Monal; Mamtha
- Cinematography: Sri Shankar
- Edited by: P. Sai Suresh
- Music by: Bharani
- Production companies: Mega Movie Hits; Sri Charan Films
- Release date: 17 May 2002
- Country: India
- Language: Tamil

Pesadha Kannum Pesume (transl. Even eyes that don't talk, will talk) is a 2002 Indian Tamil-language film directed by Murali Krishna. The film stars Kunal, Monal and new actress Mamtha in the lead roles, while Ramji and Karunas play supporting roles. The music was composed by Bharani with editing by P. Sai Suresh and cinematography by Sri Shankar. The film was released on 17 May 2002 and was a slip-up from the director's previous film Paarvai Ondre Pothume (2001). This film serves as a tribute to Monal, who died just before its release.

== Plot ==
Vikram is a happy-go-lucky man who works in an advertising agency. He is a casanova and enjoys playing pranks on people. Vikram is in love with Swetha, who is very possessive about him. In one of his many practical jokes, he tells Swetha one day that he is already married. He even introduces her to Priya, who is a model working for him, and she convinces Swetha that they are married. Swetha is heartbroken and decides to marry a boy whom her parents chose. When Vikrma learns of this, he returns and tells her that everything was a planned joke, but to his shock, Priya who was his college mate, turns against him and continues to tell Swetha that she is Vikram's wife. Priya has an axe to grind against Vikram, because of whom her father killed himself while they were in college. Finally, all ends well.

== Cast ==
- Kunal as Vikram
- Monal as Shweta
- Mamtha as Priya
- Ramji as Ganesh, Vikram's friend
- Karunas as Arun
- Shyam Ganesh
- Lollu Sabha Balaji
- Nizhalgal Ravi as Vikram's father
- Subhashini as Shwetha's mother
- Krithika as Vikram's sister
- Delhi Ganesh
- Mohan Raman
- Chaplin Balu
- Ishari K. Ganesh
- Scissor Manohar
- Santhanam as Vikram's friend (uncredited)

== Production ==
The film saw the second collaboration of Kunal, Monal, director Murali Krishna and music composer Bharani after the success of their first film Paarvai Ondre Pothume (2001). The film turned out to be the final film of Monal as she had committed suicide prior to its release. The film was launched on 5 December 2001 and the first scene was shot on Kunal and Monal at Pillayar temple of AVM Studios.

== Soundtrack ==
The music was composed by Bharani.

Track listing
No.	Title	Lyrics	Singer(s)	Length
1.	"Oh Nila"	Pa. Vijay	Hariharan	5:10
2.	"Azhagamma"	Newton	Karthik, Anuradha Sriram	5:03
3.	"Vinnaivittu"	Pa. Vijay	Harish Raghavendra, Sumithra	5:23
4.	"Chikkango"	Pa. Vijay	Tippu, Swarnalatha	4:54
5.	"Udhadugal"	Kabilan	Tippu, Swarnalatha	5:22
6.	"Figaru Figaru"	Newton	Krishnaraj	4:38
7.	"Jodipotta"	Mani	Pushpavanam Kuppusamy	1:35
Total length:				32:05

== Critical reception ==
Sify called it "one of the most insipid films" and added, "There is nothing new about the story, presentation and even the acting of Kunal and Monal are disappointing". Screen wrote, "Director Muralikrishna starts off with a good story but chooses a tame ending". Malini Mannath of Chennai Online wrote "There is nothing fresh here by way of script or narrative style, not the good music which was a chartbuster in the earlier film, and worse, the film continues long after it should have ended. There is not much by way of performances either".

Malathi Rangarajan of The Hindu wrote, "That pulling a fast one once too often and playing pranks at others' expense could turn dangerous at some point is a theme that is as old as life itself. But at least the treatment could have been different." Cinesouth wrote, "The director seems to continue reeling under the hangover of the commercial success of "Paarvai Ondre Podhume". But, the kind of weight the story has is not reflected in the screenplay. This leads to uneasy squirming of the theatre audience".
