= ITFA Best Female Playback Award =

The ITFA Best Female Playback Singer Award is given by the state government as part of its annual International Tamil Film Awards for Tamil (Kollywood) films.

== The list ==
Here is a list of the award winners and the films for which they won.

Year	Singer	Film
2011	Suchithra	Mankatha
2008	Mahathi	Bheema
2004	Harini	Parthiban Kanavu
2003	Anuradha Sriram	Gemini

== See also ==
- List of music awards honoring women
- Tamil cinema
- Cinema of India
