= Ram G =

Indian film choreographer turned actor (born 1973)

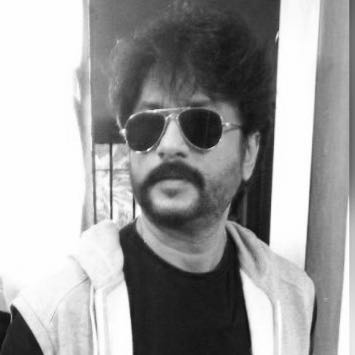
- Born: 28 November 1973 (age 52)
- Other name: Ramji
- Occupations: Actor, Choreographer, Dancer
- Spouse: Amritha Ram
- Children: 1

Ram G (also known as Ramji) is an Indian dance choreographer and actor, known for his works predominantly in Tamil cinema, and television. He is well known for his performances in Kasalavu Nesam, Ramany vs Ramany and Marmadesam.

== Career ==
The actor-choreographer often appeared in Tamil film dance numbers like "Vellarika" from Kadhal Kottai, "Easwara" from Kannedhirey Thondrinal and "Nee Paathuthu Ponnalum" from Paarvai Ondre Podhume being prime examples of his roles. In 2001, Ram G toured Japan as a part of the Tamil musical "Thilana", playing the lead role in a venture developed by Bharathan and scripted by Anita Raj and Kalyan.

As offers to feature in films began to recede, Ram G became a television compere for shows including "Dance Machi Dance", before accepting to play a role in the low-budget film, Madhavi (2009). He appeared in a series of HIV awareness adverts shown on South Indian television in 2010 as a character called "Dhillu Durai". The ad was directed by duo JD-Jerry and featured three teasers promoting AIDs awareness centres called Nambikkai Mayyam (ICTC). Later in the year, he played a supporting role in Rama Narayanan's Kutti Pisasu alongside Sangeetha and Ramya Krishnan.

== Filmography ==
=== Dancer ===
- Note: this is a list of films that Ram G only appeared as a dancer.

List of film dancing credits
Year	Film	Song	Language	Notes
1987	Per Sollum Pillai	"Ammamma Vanthathu"	Tamil	
1991	Kizhakku Karai	"Sannadhi Vaasalil"	Tamil	Tamil
1992	Singaravelan	"Pottu Vaitha"		Tamil
1993	Dalaal	"Gutur Gutur"	Hindi	
1995	Ilaya Ragam	"Marudhani Charu"	Tamil	
1996	Kadhal Kottai	"Vellarika"	Tamil	
1998	Kaadhal Mannan	"Marimuthu Marimuthu"	Tamil	
1998	Priyuralu		Telugu	Dubbed in Malayalam as Manjeeradhwani
1999	Iraniyan	"Ayyarettu"	Tamil	
2000	Uyirile Kalanthathu	"Kulukki Vecha Cococola"	Tamil	
2000	Penngal	"Kannukulla Pallanguzhi"	Tamil	
2001	Paarvai Ondre Podhume	"Nee Paathuthu Ponnalum"	Tamil	
2001	Dosth	"Hey Sal Sal"	Tamil	
2001	Dubai	"Hai Hillalin Thanka"	Malayalam	
2001	Majunu	"Mercury Mele"	Tamil	
2002	Phantom	"Mattu Pongal"	Malayalam	
2003	Ennai Thalatta Varuvala	"Ennathula"	Tamil	
2004	Srusti	"Kuruma Kuruma"	Kannada	
2006	Dharmapuri	"Vandha Vaadi"	Tamil	

=== Actor ===
- Note: this is a list of films that Ram G acted in. He also appeared as a dancer in some of these films as well.

==== Tamil films ====
List of film acting credits
Year	Film	Role	Notes
1994	Nammavar	Vijay	
1997	Kaalamellam Kadhal Vaazhga	Rama	
1997	Love Today	Peter's friend	Special appearance
1997	Vasuki		Uncredited role
1997	Vidukathai		
1997	Veerapandi Kottayiley		
1998	Kaadhale Nimmadhi	Prabhu	
1998	Thulli Thirintha Kaalam	Manohar	
1998	Kannedhirey Thondrinal	Ram	
1999	Kanave Kalaiyadhe	Anand's friend	
1999	Amarkkalam	Kutty	
1999	Ooty	Mohan	
1999	Pudhu Kudithanam		
2000	Sandhitha Velai		
2000	Pennin Manathai Thottu	Ramji	
2000	Thani Kuduthanam		
2000	Unakkaga Mattum	Guru	
2000	Chinna Chinna Kannile	Himself	Special appearance
2000	Priyamaanavale	Shankar (Priya's brother)	
2002	Alli Arjuna	Natraj	
2002	Unnai Ninaithu	Selvam	
2002	Pesadha Kannum Pesume	Ganesh	
2002	Samasthanam	Deva	Special appearance
2003	Well Done	Prakash	
2003	Nadhi Karaiyinile	Nazeer	
2003	Parasuram	Master	
2003	Indru	Selvam	
2004	Dreams	Guna	
2005	Aayudham	Police officer	
2005	Devathaiyai Kanden	Selva	
2005	Thirudiya Idhayathai	Victor	
2006	Vattaram	Veeravel Gurupadam	
2007	Aarya	Thamizharasi	
2007	Vasantham Vanthachu	Rajasekhar	
2009	Mariyadhai	Selvam	
2009	Madhavi	Mahesh	
2009	Unnai Kann Theduthe	Vino	
2010	Droham Nadanthathu Enna		
2010	Kutti Pisasu	Pichumani	
2014	13 aam Pakkam Paarkka	Ramakrishnan	
2015	MGR Sivaji Rajini Kamal	Kannan (Kannamma)	
2016	Kodambakkam Kokila		Special appearance
2016	Vellikizhamai 13am Thethi	Ramakrishnan	
2018	Naangaam Vidhi		Short film
2019	Sangathamizhan	Himself	Special appearance
2026	Happy Raj	Gupta	

==== Other language films ====
List of other language film acting credits
Year	Film	Role	Language	Notes
1998	Yaare Neenu Cheluve	Train passenger	Kannada	
1999	Manasichi Choodu	Murali's friend	Telugu	
2000	Krishna Leele		Kannada	
2002	Gelupu		Telugu	
2002	Malli Malli Chudali	Babu	Telugu	
2004	Cheppave Chirugali	Ramji	Telugu	
2012	Parijatha	Ram Krishna	Kannada	

=== Dubbing artist ===
Year	Film	Actor	Notes
2002	Kadhal Sugamanathu	Sivaji	

== Television ==
Year	Title	Role	Channel
1995	Kaiyalavu Manasu		Sun TV
1997–1998	Marmadesam Ragasiyam	Mani Sundaram	Sun TV
1999	Kasalavu Nesam	Aakash	Sun TV
2001	Ramany vs Ramany Part 02	Ramany	Raj TV
2008	Thiruvilayadal		Sun TV
2008	Simran Thirai - Kannamoochi Ray Ray		Jaya TV
2010–2012	Pondatti Thevai	Raja Rathnam	Sun TV
2012–2013	Valli	Subramani	Sun TV
2012–2013	Pillai Nila	Mahesh	Sun TV
2013–2015	Madipakkam Madhavan	Madhavan	Kalaignar TV
2016–2017	Darling Darling	Venkatesh	Zee Tamil
2019–2021	Magarasi	Sivamani	Sun TV
2021	Velammal	Mayavan	Star Vijay
2022	Ramany vs Ramany 3.0	Ramany	aha
2023	Poova Thalaya	Muthu	Sun TV
2024	Aindham Vedham	Pichai	Zee5
2025	Veera	Arivazhagan	Zee Tamil
2025–present	Ayali	Varman	Zee Tamil
