= Indradhanush (film) =

- Poster
- Directed by: V. Manohar
- Screenplay by: V. Manohar
- Story by: Ramesh Rao
- Produced by: Poornima S. Babu
- Starring: Shiva Rajkumar; Abhisaarika; Akanksha Tripathi
- Cinematography: Sundarnath Suvarna
- Edited by: T. Shashikumar
- Music by: V. Manohar
- Production company: Sumanth Productions
- Release date: 31 March 2000
- Running time: 153 minutes
- Country: India
- Language: Kannada

Indradhanush (transl. Rainbow) is a 2000 Indian Kannada-language action drama film directed, written and scored by V. Manohar and produced by Poornima S Babu. The film stars Shiva Rajkumar, Monal, Akanksha Tripathi and Hari Nayar. The film was released on 31 March 2000 and was a box office failure.

== Cast ==
- Shiva Rajkumar as Harindranath
- Monal
- Akanksha Tripathi
- Gurukiran
- Hari Nayar
- Avinash
- M.N Lakshmi Devi
- Guru Kiran
- Sundeep Malani
- Sudhakar Banannje
- Charulatha...special appearance

== Soundtrack ==
The soundtrack of the film was composed by V. Manohar.

Track listing
No.	Title	Lyrics	Singer(s)	Length
1.	"Indradhanush"	V. Manohar	Mano, Anupama
2.	"Namma Prapancha"	V. Manohar	Shiva Rajkumar, B. R. Chaya, Rithish
3.	"Nightingale Nightingale"	V. Manohar	Mano
4.	"Olden Days"	V. Manohar	Ramesh Chandra, Shanbog
5.	"Chendavo Chendavo"	V. Manohar	Sangeetha Katti
6.	"Maayaya Yaa Maayaya"	V. Manohar	V. Manohar
7.	"Yara Kanasalla"	V. Manohar	Rajkumar
8.	"Kelu Kelavva Kelavva"	V. Manohar	Rajkumar

== Reception ==
India Info wrote "On the whole a perfect masala film worth watching".
