= Ner Mugam =

2016 Indian film by Murali Krishna

- Theatrical release poster
- Directed by: Murali Krishna
- Written by: Murali Krishna
- Produced by: Rafee
- Starring: Rafee; Meenakshi Sarkar; Meera Nandan
- Cinematography: Jagadeesh V Viswam
- Edited by: Suresh Merlin
- Music by: Murali Krishna
- Production company: Hi-tecH Pictures
- Distributed by: G Studios
- Release date: 23 December 2016
- Country: India
- Language: Tamil

Ner Mugam (transl. Straight Face) is a 2016 Indian Tamil-language romantic thriller film written, directed and scored by Murali Krishna. Produced by Rafee, the film stars himself, Meenakshi Sarkar, Meera Nandan, Pandiarajan Adithya Menon. editing by Suresh Merlin and cinematography by Jagadeesh V Viswam. The film was released on 23 December 2016.

== Cast ==
- Rafee
- Meenakshi
- Meera Nandan
- Pandiarajan
- Delhi Ganesh
- Adithya Menon
- Jinna
- Madhan Bob
- Cool Suresh
- Scissor Manohar
- Nellai Siva
- Supergood Kannan
- Mahendran
- Master Vicky

== Soundtrack ==
All lyrics are written by Murali Krishna.

Track list
No.	Title	Singer(s)	Length
1.	"Kannukku Mai"	Vikram, Priyadarshini	4:45
2.	"Poravale"	Vikram, Girish, Shiva	5:11
3.	"Un Kangalil Minnale"	Erode Shiva	3:38
Total length:			13:34

== Reception ==
A critic from iFlicks wrote "Murali Krishna, who was behind love films such as Parvai Ondre Pothume and Pesatha Kannum Pesuma has directed this film too. With twist after twist, the director has scripted a film that's well suited for the current generation. But the director has failed in directing, casting and sqeezing the work from them. Jagadeesh Viswam could've been better, so is Murali Krishna's music. Overall, Nermugam could've been straighter". A critic from Dinamalar panned the acting of lead pair, antagonist, cinematography and humour. The critic praised Murali Krishna's lyrics but criticised his music and felt he had something in mind for visualisation and direction but messed it up by doing something else which became a huge drawback. A critic from Maalai Malar wrote that the director tried to add too many twists and gave a thriller for today's trend but felt he could have concentrated on direction and acting choices.
