= Bharani (composer) =

- Born: Gunasekaran; 19 June 1971 (age 55); Arundhavapuram, Thanjavur district, Tamil Nadu, India
- Occupations: Music director, Lyricist, Director, Singer
- Years active: 1992 – present
- Spouse: Sumithra B

Bharani is an Indian film score and soundtrack composer. He has predominantly scored music for Tamil films apart from working in a few Telugu films. He has also sung few of his own compositions.

== Early life ==
Bharani was born in a village near Tanjore and was the eldest son in a family of three brothers. He studied up until Class 10 and actively used to compose songs during his school days, and came to Chennai in 1989 seeking an opportunity.

== Career ==
Bharani, under his real name Gunasekaran, initially made a breakthrough as a lyricist and wrote Vijay's first on screen song for Naalaiya Theerpu (1992).

Bharani was introduced as a music director by director S. A. Chandrasekhar in Periyanna (1999), before going to gain acclaim for his work in film such as Paarvai Ondre Podhume (2001) and Charlie Chaplin (2002). Veluthu Kattu in 2010 was his twenty fifth venture. He made his directorial debut with Ondikatta in 2017.

== Discography ==
Year	Film	Notes
1999	Periyanna	
2001	Paarvai Ondre Podhume	
2001	Ladies & Gentlemen	Unreleased film
2002	Priya Nestama	Telugu film
2002	Charlie Chaplin	
2002	Pesadha Kannum Pesume	
2002	Sundhara Travels	
2002	Jaya	
2002	Mutham	
2002	Style	
2003	Yes Madam	
2003	Sindhamal Sitharamal	
2003	Vedanthangal	
2004	Meesai Madhavan	
2004	Kadhal Thiruda	Unreleased Film
2004	Manathil	Unreleased Film
2005	Kaatrullavarai	
2005	Alaiyadikkuthu	
2005	Thirudiya Idhayathai	
2006	Oru Kadhal Seiveer	
2006	Thodu	Unreleased Film
2006	Neeku Naaku	Telugu film
2008	Tharagu	
2009	Oru Kadhalan Oru Kadhali	
2010	Veluthu Kattu	
2011	Konjam Veyil Konjam Mazhai	
2011	Vengayam	
2013	Kolagalam	
2014	Sutrula	
2015	Vairan	
2017	Ondikatta	Also director
2022	Meippada Sei	
2026	Vasool Mannan	
