= Monal Naval =

Indian actress

Monal
- Monal in 2000
- Born: Radhamonal Naval; 26 January 1981; New Delhi, NCT of Delhi, India
- Died: 14 April 2002 (aged 21); Chennai, Tamil Nadu, India
- Cause of death: Suicide by hanging
- Occupation: Film actress
- Years active: 2000–2002
- Relatives: Simran (sister); Jyoti Anand (sister)

Radhamonal Naval (26 January 1981 – 14 April 2002) was an Indian actress who appeared in Tamil films. She is known for her debut role in the film Paarvai Ondre Pothume (2001) alongside Kunal. Monal died on 14 April 2002 after committing suicide in her apartment in Chennai.

== Early life ==
Radhamonal Naval was born on 26 January 1981 to parents Ashok Naval and Saratha in Delhi. She did her schooling in Delhi and college in Bombay, and studied for the Bachelor of Commerce degree in Mithibai College. She had two sisters, actresses Simran and Jyothi, and a brother, Sumeet.

== Career ==
Throughout her career, Monal did some modelling, fashion shows and beauty contests, and subsequently received film offers. Her sister Simran was a leading actress in South Indian films during the period, while another sister, Jyoti, made her debut in 2003. She made her debut in 2001 and was reported by the media for throwing tantrums on the sets of her first film. She was signed up to make her debut in Badri alongside Vijay, but her first release was Paarvai Ondre Pothume alongside Kunal (the lead actor of Kadhalar Dhinam).

Monal appeared in a few more films, with most turning out to be moderate successes at the box office. At the time of her death, she was working on Dadagiri, a Telugu film which also featured her Suman, and Best of Luck, a Tamil film co-starring Eashwar and Yugendran. On the day of her death, she had attended the launch of her new film Paiye Janmam, literally translating into "Ghost Life".

== Death ==
Monal was found hanging on 14 April 2002, aged 21, in her room in Chennai.

In May 2002, Simran accused dance choreographer Prasanna Sujit for being a possible reason for her suicide, claiming that Prasanna had broken off his relationship with her just days earlier.

== Filmography ==
Year	Film	Role	Language	Notes
2000	Indradhanush	Yavanika	Kannada	Credited as Abhisarika
2001	Paarvai Ondre Pothume	Neetha	Tamil	
2001	Badri	Mamati	Tamil	
2001	Lovely	Madhubala	Tamil	
2001	Samudhiram	Priya	Tamil	
2001	Ishtam		Telugu	Special appearance
2002	Vivaramana Aalu		Tamil	Guest appearance
2002	Maa Tujhhe Salaam	Nargis	Hindi	
2002	Charlie Chaplin	Thilothama	Tamil	
2002	Pesadha Kannum Pesume	Swetha	Tamil	
2005	Aadhikkam	Jhansi	Tamil	Posthumously released 3 years after death
