= Punnagai Desam =

- Poster
- Directed by: K. Shahjahan
- Written by: K. Shahjahan
- Produced by: R. B. Choudary
- Starring: Tarun; Kunal; Hamsavardhan; Sneha; Preetha Vijayakumar; Dhamu
- Cinematography: R. Madhi
- Edited by: V. Jaishankar
- Music by: S. A. Rajkumar
- Production company: Super Good Films
- Release date: 14 January 2002
- Country: India
- Language: Tamil

Punnagai Desam (transl. Land of smiles) is a 2002 Indian Tamil-language romantic drama film directed by K. Shajahan in his debut, and produced by R. B. Choudary of Super Good Films. The film stars an ensemble cast of Tarun, Kunal, Hamsavardhan, Dhamu, Sneha and Preetha Vijayakumar, with Devan, Nizhalgal Ravi, Vinu Chakravarthy and Malaysia Vasudevan playing supporting roles. Soundtrack is composed by S. A. Rajkumar.

R. Madhi and V. Jaishankar handled cinematography and editing respectively. The film did reasonable business at the box-office upon release on 14 January 2002. It was remade by Shajahan in Telugu as Nava Vasantham (2007) with Tarun reprising his role. This was the final Tamil film of Preetha before her subsequent retirement from the film industry.

== Plot ==
Ganesh comes to Chennai hoping to meet his maternal uncle, Rajarathinam, after the sudden death of his mother, Parvathi, who once helped Rajarathinam during his struggling years. However, Rajarathinam has become wealthy and arrogant, and he rejects Ganesh. Ganesh also loves Bomma, his uncle’s daughter and his childhood friend, but Rajarathinam will not allow him to see her and throws him out of the house.

Ganesh reunites with his school friends Selvam, Raja and Vijay. Selvam hopes to become an IAS officer, Raja wants to be a singer, and Vijay dreams of becoming a mimicry artist. Their parents, however, do not support these ambitions and expect them to take up ordinary jobs instead. Discouraged, the friends head to Chennai in search of success. Yet Raja and Vijay struggle to find any chance to prove their talent, while Selvam joins college but finds it difficult to pay his fees.

Seeing his friends’ hardships, Ganesh decides to help them. He sells Parvathi’s chain, which he had intended to give Bomma, and starts a small roadside food business near Marina Beach. A talented cook, he begins selling packaged lunches and uses the earnings to support his friends. He keeps his own struggles hidden, telling them instead that Rajarathinam provides him with money whenever needed.

The four friends share a small house, where the landlord, Ravi Chandhiran, advises them to take up jobs so they can earn money and improve their lives. He is also saddened to see Ganesh spending all his earnings on his friends. Ganesh, however, remains hopeful and continues to believe that each of them will succeed one day.

Nandhini and Priya are Selvam’s classmates. Nandhini loves Selvam, but he does not return her feelings. Priya, meanwhile, is revealed to be Rajarathinam’s daughter and is none other than Bomma herself.

One day, Raja and Vijay spot Ganesh selling tea on the beach. Shocked, they learn how much he has sacrificed to help them live with dignity. Moved by his loyalty, they decide to support him in return. Together, the four open a small hotel, with Ganesh cooking and the others helping in their spare time.

Later, Selvam tells Nandhini to stop following him and explains that he cannot think about love while he is still trying to achieve his goal of becoming an IAS officer and fulfilling his father’s ambitions. Nandhini understands. She and Priya accompany Selvam to meet Ganesh, and both are impressed by him. The group becomes close, and Priya gradually falls in love with Ganesh.

Ganesh works hard to secure a stage opportunity for Raja and Vijay by pleading with a sabha manager. He even sells his hotel and pays the deposit needed for the performance. The manager agrees, and Raja and Vijay perform successfully, with Raja singing and Vijay providing mimicry-based background sounds. They soon become popular. Selvam later clears the IAS examination and is posted as a collector. All three friends achieve success, while Ganesh continues to work in a hotel.

Priya later confesses her love to Ganesh, only to discover that he still loves Bomma. Heartbroken, she withdraws. Meanwhile, Rajarathinam arranges Priya’s marriage to their family friend Ashok Kumar, and though she is unwilling, she agrees.

At a function in Chennai celebrating Raja, Selvam and Vijay’s success, their parents arrive and look down on Ganesh because of his poverty. During the event, the three men thank their parents, leaving Ravi Chandhiran disappointed. He scolds Ganesh, saying that this is how people behave once they gain money and fame, and that Ganesh has wasted everything for friends who have now forgotten him.

However, Raja, Selvam and Vijay then reveal on stage that their praise of their parents was only a formality. They explain that their parents never supported them during their difficult days, and that Ganesh was the one who stood by them. They call him on stage and publicly thank him, saying that he was their true strength and emotional support.

They then reveal Ganesh’s childhood love for Bomma, show a childhood photograph of her, and ask her to come forward if she is watching the live telecast. They also declare that all the money they earned belongs to Ganesh, since Rajarathinam abandoned him simply for being poor. Priya, seeing the photograph, realises that Bomma is her own name and rushes to the venue. She meets Ganesh, and everyone is astonished as the film ends happily with their reunion.

== Cast ==
- Tarun as Ganesh
- Sneha as Priya alias Bomma
- Kunal as Raja
- Hamsavardhan as Selvam
- Dhamu as Vijay
- Preetha Vijayakumar as Nandhini, Selvam's love interest
- Krishna as Ashok Kumar, Priya's relative
- Vinu Chakravarthy as Vijay's father
- Nizhalgal Ravi as Raja's father
- Malaysia Vasudevan as House owner Ravichandran
- Sabitha Anand as Parvathi, Ganesh's mother and Rajarathinam's elder sister
- Devan as Rajarathinam, Priya's father and Ganesh's maternal uncle
- Vadivukkarasi as Selvam's stepmother
- Sathyapriya as Lakshmi, Priya's mother and Ganesh's mother in law
- Madhan Bob as a music director of a carnatic program
- Scissor Manohar
- Kovai Babu
- Stun Siva as a thief (Guest appearance)

== Production ==
The film marked the directorial debut of K. Shahjahan who earlier worked as assistant director to Vikraman. R. Madhi made his debut as cinematographer with this film.

== Soundtrack ==
Soundtrack was composed by S. A. Rajkumar.

Song	Singers	Lyrics
"Doli Doli"	P. Unnikrishnan, Harish Raghavendra, Swarnalatha, Dr. Narayanan	P. Vijay
"Engal Mootchukulle"	Shankar Mahadevan	Vaali
"Ennai Pada Vaitha"	Hariharan	Viveka
"Kaatrile Paattu"	P. Unnikrishnan	Ra. Ravishankar
"Mazhaiye Oh Mazhaiye Siru Punnagai Thoovuriye"	Sujatha	Kalaikumar
"Vetrikku Mel Vetri"	Shankar Mahadevan	Vaali

== Critical reception ==
Malini Mannath from Chennai Online opined that "It is a real good film, neatly scripted, with the scenes flowing smoothly". A critic from Sify wrote that "On the whole the film lacks soul and style associated with the Vikraman school of film-making". Malathi Rangarajan from The Hindu said that "IT IS a tale of four friends — nothing very new — the typical Pudhu Vasantham kind of story. But in SuperGood Films' Punnagai Desam romance has a more prominent part to play. The treatment by K. Shahjahan is decent because nobody gets too unnatural and over-emotional at any point."
