= Unnai Ninaithu =

- Poster
- Directed by: Vikraman
- Written by: Vikraman
- Produced by: K. Muralitharan; V. Swaminathan; G. Venugopal
- Starring: Suriya; Laila; Sneha
- Cinematography: Balasubramaniem
- Edited by: V. Jaishankar
- Music by: Sirpy
- Production company: Lakshmi Movie Makers
- Release date: 10 May 2002
- Running time: 163 minutes
- Country: India
- Language: Tamil

Unnai Ninaithu (transl. Thinking about you) is a 2002 Indian Tamil-language romantic drama film written and directed by Vikraman. It stars Suriya, Laila and Sneha in the lead roles while Ramesh Khanna, Charle, R. Sundarrajan and Ramji play supporting roles. The film was released on 10 May 2002 and became a commercial success. It was remade into Telugu by the same director as Cheppave Chirugali (2004) Kannada as Krishna (2007).

== Plot ==
Surya works as a receptionist in a lodge in Chennai. He, along with his friend Gopi, manages the entire lodge. Actually, the lodge is owned by Surya's father but has been leased due to financial troubles. Radha is the daughter of the new manager for the lodge who stays next to the lodge along with her mother and family. Radha gets attracted towards Surya upon seeing his good nature, but Surya tells his past love story to Radha.

A few days ago Nirmala lived in the same house where Radha lives now. Surya likes Nirmala and helps her family financially. Slowly, Surya and Nirmala fall in love, and Nirmala's parents decide to get them married. Selvam is Suriya's friend who stays with him during his initial days. Later, Selvam secures a good job and starts earning well. Selvam also gets attracted towards Nirmala and tries to impress her. Nirmala's parents consider Selvam to be a better match for Nirmala as he earns more than Surya. They convince Nirmala to marry Selvam.

Surya gets heartbroken knowing this, but one day, he finds Selvam in a shopping mall with another girl. Surya understands that Selvam has no intention of marrying Nirmala and is planning only for an illegitimate relationship with her. Surya informs this to Nirmala, who misunderstands that he is trying to break her relationship with Selvam by cooking up false stories. Nirmala, along with her family, moves to a big house given by Selvam. Surya, unable to bear Nirmala being deceived by Selvam, locates him in a mall and beats him up. Nirmala sees this and defends Selvam, ordering Surya to never see her again.

The story comes to the present, and Radha is even more impressed upon listening to Surya's past love story. One day, Surya finds Nirmala and gets to know that Selvam has broken the promise to marry her and humiliated her and her family and they had to leave everything and return to poverty. Surya is worried seeing Nirmala and her family's poor state and again offers help. Nirmala had plans of pursuing MBBS before. Surya helps her in writing the entrance examination. She gets admission only in a private medical college where the fee is high. Surya sells his lodge to the lessee and gives the money to Nirmala to use it for the education fee.

Five years pass by, and Nirmala completes her medical degree and gets a job posting, as well. All these years, Surya gave her financial and moral support in pursuing her education. Meanwhile, Radha also remains unmarried as she loves Surya, but she never expressed it to him. Nirmala is about to leave to another city for a job along with her family. At the railway station, she conveys her interest in marrying Surya, who refuses her proposal by saying that he helped her only because he once loved her and didn't wish to see her in poverty, but did not harbour any feelings for her. He says that he knows that Radha is in love with him and that she has been declining all marriage alliances coming her way for the last five years waiting for Surya. Surya also says that Radha's love is more genuine than Nirmala's because Nirmala ditched him when she found a better guy than Surya, while Radha was rejecting all other proposals for him. Radha overhears the conversation and feels happy. The film ends with both Surya and Radha getting united.

== Cast ==
- Suriya as Surya
- Laila as Nirmala
- Sneha as Radha
- R. Sundarrajan as Chittoor Chinnamani
- Charle as Mei Meiyappan
- Ramesh Khanna as Gopi
- Thalaivasal Vijay as Nirmala's father
- Sathyapriya as Radha's mother
- Pallavi as Nirmala's mother
- Chitra Lakshmanan as Vaidyalingam
- Balu Anand as Radha's father
- Ramji as Selvam
- Kulir Kumaresan as Room Boy
- Uma Maheshwari as Radha's sister
- Sheela as Radha's sister
- Hari Prashanth as Nirmala's brother
- Delhi Ganesh as Surya's Lodge owner
- Pandu as Vaidyalingam's follower
- Mayilsamy as Vaidyalingam's Patient
- Kovai Senthil as Producer's mad son
- Visweswara Rao
- Siva Narayana Murthy as Perumal
- Manager Cheena as Deluxe Room Customer
- Poraali Dileepan as PCO owner

== Production ==
Vijay, who worked with Vikraman in Poove Unakkaga (1996), was chosen by him to play the lead role in Unnai Ninaithu and the actor shot for a few days before opting out of the project, owing to creative differences. He was subsequently replaced by Suriya. Vikraman also briefly considered casting actor Prashanth, before finalising Suriya. In 2026, Vikraman shared an unreleased version of the song "Ennai Thalattum", featuring Vijay and Laila.

The team predominantly shot the film in Chennai and Visakhapatnam areas, while songs were shot in Malaysia, Thailand and Sri Lanka. The team travelled to Kandy and the Ramboda Falls to film sequences across Sri Lanka, and it became the first film by director Vikraman to be shot outside India. Suriya performed a stunt sequence, where his character jumps into a well of 100 feet (30 m) depth, after refusing a stunt double.

== Soundtrack ==
The music was composed by Sirpy.

Title	Singers	Lyrics	Duration
"Chocklet Chocklet"	Tippu	Pa. Vijay	4:41
"Pombalainga Kadhal"	Manikka Vinayagam, P. Unnikrishnan	Pa. Vijay	5:38
"Ennai Thalattum"	Unni Menon, Sujatha	Pa. Vijay	4:38
"Yaar Indha Devathai"	Hariharan	R. Ravishankar	4:15
"Yaar Indha Devathai" II	Unni Menon	R. Ravishankar	4:15
"Sil Sil Silala"	P. Unnikrishnan, Sujatha	Pa. Vijay	4:21
"Happy New Year"	P. Unnikrishnan, Sujatha	Kalaikumar	4:30
"Ennai Thalattum" (female only)	Sujatha	Pa. Vijay	4:42

== Release and reception ==
The film was released on 10 May 2002. A reviewer from The Hindu wrote, "the story must have had a strong theme to begin with and the screenplay surely aims at conveying something different. But things do not progress in that direction", and adds that "the treatment lacks punch". The reviewer from Sify gave the film a negative review, adding "the film is very slow and one feels that the story is as old as the hills", adding that it is a "rehash of the director's earlier hits and is long winded and extremely slow paced mainly due to illogical story, songs pushed into the narrative and a jarring comedy track". Cinesouth wrote "A typical Vikraman film. Amidst many an embarrassments, the film manages to win our hearts. Let's accept it". The film went on to perform well at the box office, and did exceptional business in town and village theatres across Tamil Nadu.

== Legacy ==
The comic scenes involving the fradulence of astrologer Mei Meiyappan (Charle) became popular. One of them was referenced by VCK deputy general secretary Vanni Arasu on X platform in May 2026, to criticise Vijay, now the Chief Minister of Tamil Nadu, for appointing his personal astrologer Radhan Pandit to the post of the Chief Minister's Officer on Special Duty.

== Accolades ==
Award	Category	Nominee	Ref.
2002 Filmfare Awards South	Filmfare Award for Best Supporting Actress – Tamil	Sneha	
2002 Tamil Nadu State Awards	Best Film	Unnai Ninaithu	
2002 Tamil Nadu State Awards	Best Music Director	Sirpy	
2002 Tamil Nadu State Awards	Best Lyricist	Ravishankar	
2002 Tamil Nadu State Awards	Best Male Playback Singer	Unni Menon	
