= Lovely (2001 film) =

2001 film by Sakthi Chidambaram

- VCD cover
- Directed by: Sakthi
- Written by: Sakthi; N. Prasannakumar (dialogues)
- Produced by: V. A. Durai
- Starring: Karthik; Malavika; Monal
- Cinematography: B. Kannan
- Edited by: S. Ramesh; N. Ganesh Kumar; R. R. Eeswar
- Music by: Deva
- Production company: Evergreen Movie International
- Release date: 6 July 2001
- Running time: 160 minutes
- Country: India
- Language: Tamil

Lovely is a 2001 Indian Tamil-language romantic comedy film written and directed by S. K. Jeeva (credited as Sakthi) who previously directed Pudhumai Pithan. The film stars Karthik, Malavika and Monal in the lead roles, while Vivek, Manivannan, Nizhalgal Ravi, and Vinu Chakravarthy play supporting roles. The film's score and soundtrack are composed by Deva.

Lovely was released on 6 July 2001. It was remade in Telugu as Andamaina Abaddham (2008).

== Plot ==
The film revolves around Chandran "Chandru" and his lover Niveditha in the backdrop of Ooty. Niveditha's father Mahadevan is against love marriages, and he finds out that his daughter is in love with someone. Mahadevan asks Niveditha for the details of her lover, and Niveditha as per Chandru's plan, hands over a photo of Chandru's friend Azhagesh to her father and informs him as her lover. Mahadevan sends some goons to attack Azhagesh, and the proceedings happen comically.

Meanwhile, Chandru and Niveditha keep planning on how to make Mahadevan nod for their wedding. One day, Mahadevan's car gets repaired on the way. Chandru, along with his family, also comes on the same way. Seeing Mahadevan helpless on the road, Chandru picks him up and drops him at home, thereby getting into Mahadevan's good books. Slowly, Mahadevan and Chandru become good family friends. But still, Chandru and Niveditha do not reveal their love to their parents and are happy that both families are on good terms now.

Chandru's parents decide to get him married to Niveditha, and they meet Mahadevan with a marriage proposal. Mahadevan also agrees for the wedding and informs Niveditha, who still pretends that she is in love with Azhagesh. Chandru and Niveditha feel happy that things are proceeding well as per the plan and their wedding is going to be a smooth one. But to everyone's surprise, a few days before the wedding, Chandru's brother elopes with Niveditha's sister. Both families start searching for them, and in the meantime, the families start quarrelling over each other due to this issue and separate. Finally, Chandru finds the eloped couple in a police station. It is revealed that Niveditha's sister wanted to cancel Niveditha's wedding with Chandru as she thought that Niveditha was in love in Azhagesh. Hence, Chandru's brother helps in the plan, and they staged the drama so that both the families will fight and the wedding will be cancelled.

Chandru is shocked hearing this and reveals that Niveditha was in love only with him and Azhagesh was just meant to divert Mahadevan. But Mahadevan overhears this and gets furious that Chandru and Niveditha cheated him. Finally, Chandru apologizes, and Mahadevan forgives him as he really is impressed with his character. Chandru and Niveditha are united.

== Cast ==
- Karthik as Chandran "Chandru"
- Malavika as Nivedha Mahadevan
- Monal as Madhubala
- Vivek as Azhagesh (Algates)
- Manivannan as Mahadevan, Nivedha's father
- Vinu Chakravarthy as Panneerselvam
- Nizhalgal Ravi as Chandru's father
- Pandu as Paneerselvam's sidekick
- Sethu Vinayagam as Sumathi's husband
- Balu Anand as Chandru's brother-in-law
- Mahanadi Shankar as Thottapetta Gaja
- Delhi Ganesh as Mahadevan's father (cameo appearance)
- Shanthi Williams as Nivedha's mother
- S. N. Lakshmi as Nivedha's grandmother
- K. R. Vatsala as Chandru's mother
- Sindhu as Nivedha's sister
- J. Lalitha as Chandru's aunt
- Aishwarya as Nivedha's sister
- Master Udayaraj as Young Mahadevan
- Kovai Senthil as Mahadevan's assistant
- Siva Narayana Murthy as Siva Narayana Murthy
- Meenal as Nurse Madhumitha (uncredited)

== Production ==
The film was announced with Karthik and Devayani, but the actress's impending marriage meant that she was replaced by Malavika. The film was directed by Sakthi who earlier directed Parthiban starrer Pudhumai Pithan (1998) under the name S. K. Jeeva.

== Soundtrack ==
Soundtrack was composed by Deva.

Song	Singers	Lyrics
"I Na Sabai"	Srinivas, Harini	Pa. Vijay
"Manmadha"	Anuradha Sriram	Palani Bharathi
"Silver Nilave"	P. Unnikrishnan, Anuradha Sriram	P. Vijay
"Vaadi Machinichi"	Krishnaraj, Anuradha Sriram	Palani Bharathi
"Vinodhamanavale" (Duet)	Hariharan, Sujatha	P. Vijay
"Vinodhamanavale" (Men)	Hariharan	P. Vijay

== Critical reception ==
The Hindu wrote "Lovely has enticing visuals and guileless humour – Vivek, Vinu Chakravarthy style. If only the unwarranted convolutions in the end had been avoided, the film would have probably been as enjoyable [..]". Visual Dasan of Kalki wrote since it is director's second film, he has carefully crafted the screenplay. If he had shown the same attention to visuals, the frequent yawns could have been avoided.
