= Kathir =

Indian film director and screenwriter

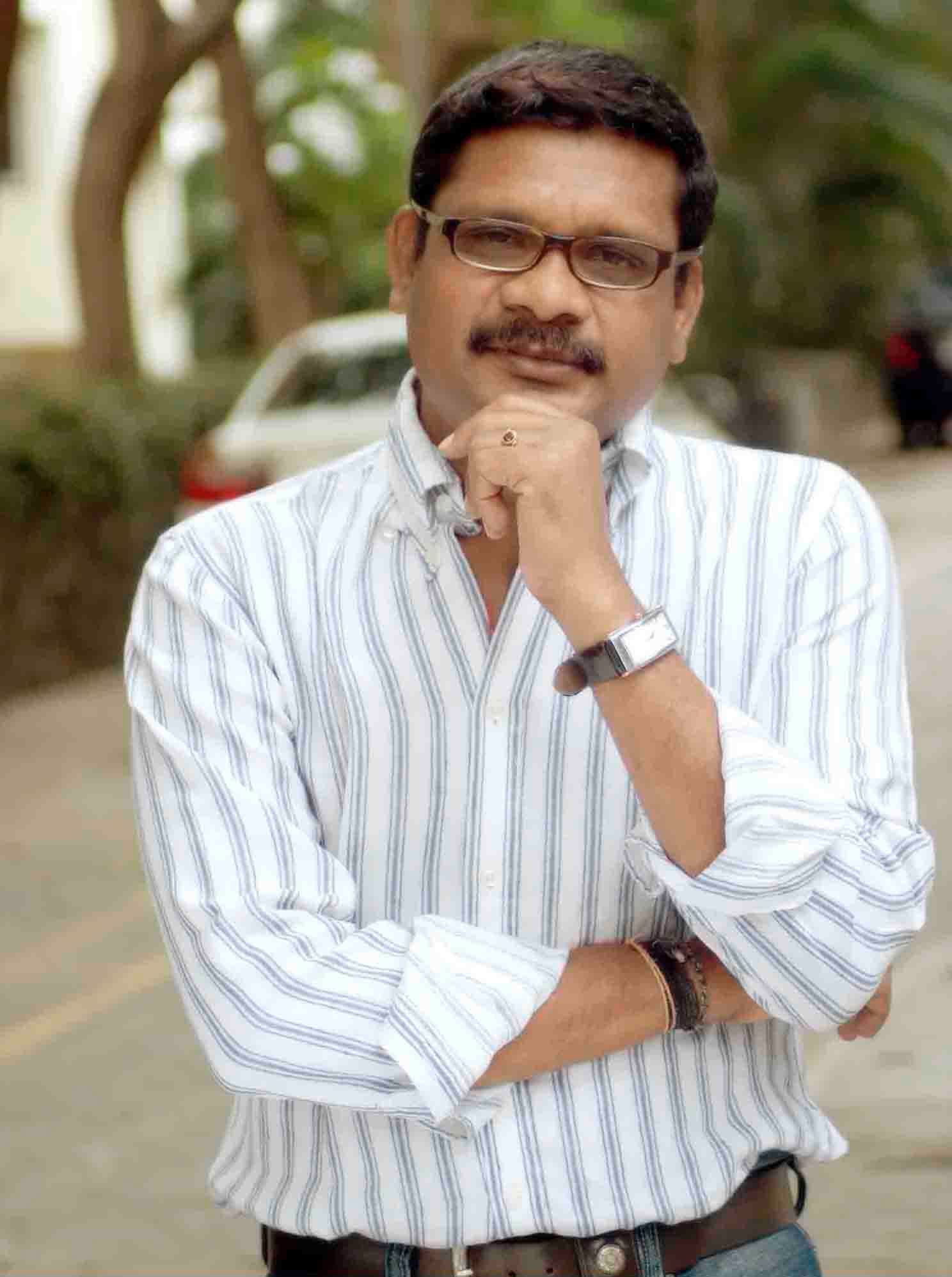
- Born: Tirunelveli, Tamil Nadu, India
- Occupations: Film director; producer; screenwriter
- Years active: 1991 – 2016
- Spouse: Shanthinidevi

Kathir is an Indian film director, producer, and screenwriter who works predominantly in Tamil cinema.

== Early life ==
Kathir was born in kalkarai, a small village in the Radhapuram Taluk of Tirunelveli District, state of Tamil Nadu, India. Kathir grew up in a middle-class family as the only son along with his three sisters. His father Subhash was a farmer and mother Isakiammal assisted him in his farming. Kathir had his elementary schooling in kalkarai elementary school. He finished his 5th standard there and joined St. Teresa's school in Vadakangulam. He completed his school studies here. Kathir got into the College of Fine arts and Crafts, Chennai. He did a five-year course in Fine arts and graduated with a Diploma in Fine Arts.

== Career ==
Kathir started out as a poster designer in the film industry, and designed posters for films including Moondram Pirai (1981), Andha 7 Naatkal (1981), Darling, Darling, Darling (1982) and Mani Ratnam's Pagal Nilavu (1985) to make pocket money while he was in college.

He worked as an assistant director for Pandiarajan and GM Kumar. In 1996, Kadhal Desam emerged as the biggest hit of his career grossing ₹10 crore at the box office. Kathir scripted and was ready to make a film titled I Love You by 1997. After being unable to produce the film himself, he shelved the venture. In 2001, he founded his own production studio Sound Light Studio through which he produced Kadhal Virus. He also distributed the film all over Tamil Nadu. He moved on to briefly begin pre-production work on a project titled Bangalore in late 1999, before opting not to continue.

Kathir announced a comeback in 2008 and began work on a film titled Manavar Dhinam with Vinay in the lead role. Following a delay, the actor was replaced by Srikanth and a launch was held in 2009 by the production house Ayngaran International. However, the film was later shelved and the pair decided to collaborate for the new venture titled Kodai Vidumurai. The film underwent a change in cast and work on the film, featuring Shaam, began again in July 2012. The film has since failed to make progress.

== Personal life ==
He is married to Shanthinidevi in 2013.

== Filmography ==
- Note: all films are in Tamil, unless otherwise noted.

Year	Film	Notes		
Year	Film	Notes	1991	Idhayam
1993	Uzhavan			
1996	Kadhal Desam			
1999	Kadhalar Dhinam	partially reshot in Hindi as Dil Hi Dil Mein		
2002	Kadhal Virus	Also producer		
2016	Nan Love Track	Kannada film		
