= Samasthanam =

- Poster
- Directed by: Raj Kapoor
- Written by: Raj Kapoor
- Produced by: M. Kajamydeen; K. Ayisha
- Starring: Suresh Gopi; R. Sarathkumar; Devayani; Goundamani; Abhirami
- Cinematography: B. Balamurugan
- Edited by: V. T. Vijayan
- Music by: Deva
- Production company: Roja Combines
- Release date: 26 September 2002
- Country: India
- Language: Tamil

Samasthanam (transl. Throne) is a 2002 Indian Tamil-language action drama film directed by Raj Kapoor. The film stars Suresh Gopi, R. Sarathkumar, Devayani and Abhirami and music by Deva. It was released on 26 September 2002.

== Plot ==
Thiru and Surya are inseparable friends. They are so close to each other that Thiru selects a bride for Surya and vice versa. Their friendship is carried over from their grandfathers and fathers, who were thick friends. Thiru brings up Surya's daughter because he has no children. Shankara wants to separate them and does all he could to. Surya's sister becomes pregnant due to a love affair with Shankara's brother. On the eve of her wedding, Divya, Thiru's wife, helps her run away with the guy she loves. This breaks the friendship between the two as Surya's mother poisons his ears against Thiru. As expected, Shankara is behind this because he wants to avenge the death of his father Easwaramoorthy, who was killed by Thiru's father Vetrishwaran, an honest police inspector. Finally, in the climax, the two destroy Shankara, resolve their differences, and unite in the end.

== Cast ==
- Suresh Gopi as Surya
- R. Sarathkumar as Thiru and Inspector Vetreshwaran
- Goundamani as Selvam
- Devayani as Divya
- Abhirami as Aishwarya
- Senthil as Mani
- Ashish Vidyarthi as Shankara
- Vadivukkarasi as Surya's mother
- Chandrasekhar as Sundarapandian, Surya's father
- Manivannan as Paraman
- Sabitha Anand as Parama's wife
- Raj Kapoor as Eswaramoorthy, Shankara's father
- Viji Chandrasekhar as Shankara's mother
- Ramji as Deva
- Haripriya as Kavya
- Rishi as Jeeva
- Lekhasri as Sandaikaari Soniya
- Lavanya as Sudha
- Vinod Kishan as Young Shankara

== Production ==
Some scenes were shot at Pollachi.

== Soundtrack ==
The soundtrack was composed by Deva.

Song	Singer(s)	Lyrics	Duration
"Stella Maris"	Simbhu	Pa. Vijay	5:38
"Oru Kuringi Poo"	Krishnaraj, Anuradha Sriram, Harini, Srinivas	Pa. Vijay	6:16
"Penne Penne"	P. Unnikrishnan, Tippu, Harini, Ganga	Na. Muthukumar	6:23
"Eswaraa Eswaraa"	Tippu, Karthik	Pa. Vijay	5:46
"Koththamalli"	Simbhu, Sujatha	Pa. Vijay	6:10
"Malaraai Malaraai"	P. Unnikrishnan	Pa. Vijay	2:12

== Critical reception ==
Malathi Rangarajan of The Hindu wrote, "Lengthy flashbacks and unwarranted song sequences mar the tempo of Samasthanam. The story is strong, but the screenplay lacks crispness". Sify wrote, "The director of the film Raj Kapur has not been able to come out with anything new as this film stretches beyond belief and endurance too". Malini Mannath of Chennai Online wrote "director [..] moving his narration steadily through clichéd scenes and predictable situations".

Cinesouth wrote, "Unbearable flashbacks and a torturous screenplay have made this film a word out penny in our eyes". C. Shivakumar of Deccan Herald wrote, "The flick is based on male bonding but lacks punch with average cinematography, dull songs and old and tired looking stars. Director Raj Kapoor has failed to bring out the best from the stars and at times he has tried to overdo some scenes portraying the deep friendship between the lead characters".
