= Charlie Chaplin (2002 film) =

2002 Indian film by Sakthi Chidambaram

- Poster
- Directed by: Sakthi Chidambaram
- Written by: Sakthi Chidambaram
- Produced by: M. Kajamaideen; K. Ayisha
- Starring: Prabhu; Prabhu Deva; Livingston; Abhirami; Gayathri Raghuraman
- Cinematography: Siva
- Edited by: Anil Malnad
- Music by: Bharani
- Production company: Roja Combines
- Release date: 15 February 2002
- Country: India
- Language: Tamil

Charlie Chaplin is a 2002 Indian Tamil-language comedy film directed by Sakthi Chidambaram, starring Prabhu and Prabhu Deva in the lead roles. Abhirami, Gayathri Raguram and Livingston play other supporting roles. It was released on 15 February 2002, and became a commercial success. Prabhu won the Tamil Nadu State Film Award Special Prize for his performance in the film. The film's commercial success led to remakes in several languages, such as in Telugu as Pellam Oorelithe, Hindi as No Entry, Malayalam as Happy Husbands, Kannada as Kalla Malla Sulla, Marathi as No Entry Pudhe Dhoka Aahey and in Bengali as Kelor Kirti.

== Plot ==
Ramakrishnan is a rich businessman in Ooty who owns an advertising company and tea estates. He is married to Mythili, who is very possessive about her husband. Mythili always suspects her husband, fearing that he would end up having an affair with some other girl, as they are childless after 5 years of marriage, and this brings frequent quarrels between the couple. However, Ramakrishnan is a kind-hearted and honest man, and he takes great care of his wife with love.

Thirunavukkarasu, alias Thiru, is a poor photographer in the same town, and initially, Ramakrishnan misunderstands Thiru to be a rogue. Later, he understands his good nature and provides him with a job in his own company. Thiru, who was orphaned after his mother died 3 years ago, is very loyal to Ramakrishnan and Mythili and respects Ramakrishnan as his brother. Ramakrishnan is also very kind to Thiru. One day, Thiru meets a girl, Suseela aka Susi, and the two fall in love with each other. Susi is a social activist who voices for women's empowerment, and the daughter of the district judge. Vishwa is a close friend of Ramakrishnan and is married to Amudha. But Vishwa is a playboy and has affairs with many girls. One day, a small quarrel erupts between Ramakrishnan and Mythili, following which Ramakrishnan worries about his wife's continuous suspicious behaviour. Vishwa plans to relax Ramakrishnan by engaging a call girl, Thilothama.

Ramakrishnan, although not interested in it, finally decides to spend some time with Thilothama when Mythili is away to Tirupathi. Thilothama comes to Ramakrishnan's guest house, where Thiru lives. Suddenly, Mythili cancels her trip and returns home. On the way, she finds Ramakrishnan's car in Thiru's home, and she also comes to Thiru's home. Mythili gets shocked to see Thilothama and Ramakrishnan in Thiru's home. Ramakrishnan suddenly manages the situation by lying that Thilothama is none other than Thiru's lover. Mythili believes this, while Thiru does not reveal the truth, knowing that it would separate Ramakrishnan from Mythili.

Then it is a cat and mouse game where Thiru tries to act as Thilothama's love in front of Mythili, at the same time, tries hard not to get caught by Susi, as she is short-tempered and hates someone lying to her. Finally, Mythili and Susi get to know about the lies told by Thiru and Ramakrishnan. Ramakrishnan and Thiru try hard to find Thilothama and make her tell the truth that nothing happened between them. But to their shock, Thilothama committed suicide, and they have no other proof now.

Susi decides to break up with Thiru while Mythili applies for a divorce from Ramakrishnan. Finally, in the court, Ramakrishnan expresses how much he loves Mythili and tells the truth and requests her to believe him. Also, Amudha and Vishwa convince Susi and Mythili, whereby Amudha says that she very well knows about Vishwa's affair with so many girls, but she still lives with a hope of getting him back as a loyal husband someday. Mythili and Susi understand Ramakrishnan and Thiru's good nature, and they unite in the end.

== Cast ==
- Prabhu as Ramakrishnan
- Prabhu Deva as Thirunavukkarasu (Thiru)
- Livingston as Vishwa
- Abhirami as Mythili Ramakrishnan
- Gayathri Raghuraman as Suseela (Susi)
- Vindhya as Amudha Vishwa
- Monal as Thilothama
- Pyramid Natarajan as Justice Samandham, Suseela's father
- Chinni Jayanth as Thirupathiraj
- Mahanadi Shankar as Police Inspector
- Pandu as MLA Erimalai
- Besant Ravi as Rogue
- Priyanka as Lakshmi, Home maid

== Production ==
Sakthi Chidambaram revealed that the story was based on a real life incident that had happened to his friend, but altered the happenings to present it in a comedy format. Despite that, some critics noted the film's similarities to the 1975 Tamil film Yarukku Mappillai Yaro. The film was initially called Uthama Purushan, but was later changed to Charlie Chaplin. The initial choices for the two leading female roles had been Gayatri Jayaraman and Sanghavi, but the two were replaced due to date issues. The filming was held at Ooty.

== Soundtrack ==
There are 7 songs in this film composed by Bharani.

Track listing
No.	Title	Lyrics	Singer(s)	Length
1.	"Ava Kannapaatha"	Pa. Vijay	S. P. Balasubrahmanyam, Harish Raghavendra	5:05
2.	"Kannadi Selai Katti"	Palani Bharathi	Krishnaraj, Swarnalatha, Karthik, Harini	5:39
3.	"Mammu Mammu"	Pa. Vijay	Tippu	2:42
4.	"Mudhalaam Sandhippil"	Pa. Vijay	P. Unnikrishnan, Swarnalatha	5:06
5.	"Ponnu Oruthi Summa"	Snehan	Tippu, Anuradha Sriram	5:09
6.	"Shansha Shalpashaa"	Sakthi Chidambaram	Tippu, Harini	4:05
7.	"Vaarthai Thavari Ponathanaley"	Kabilan	Harish Raghavendra	3:07
Total length:				30:53

== Reception ==
Chennai Online wrote, "It is a laugh riot that will drive away your blues. Prabhu with his perfect timing and penchant for comedy, and Prabhu Deva the perfect prop, strike a good chemistry on screen to provide some unpretentious fun-filled time to the viewers, leaving them no time to think or get bored. Livingston pitches his own bit to form the comic-trio". The Hindu wrote "A Comic fare with a clear storyline, a neat screenplay that has no gaping loose ends and witty dialogue with all the essential punches make watching Roja combines' Charlie Chaplin an enjoyable experience". Cinesouth wrote "After 'Ullathai Allitha', this is one film that had tickled the audience so much. So, lets hear it for director Shakthi Chidhambaram". Sify wrote "The story is old wine in new tetra pack. Tamil film writers favourite comedy theme is dominating wife suspecting poor husband of infidelity, which results in a lot of running around. Roja Combines Khaja Moideen and director Sakthi Chidambaram has dished out one more assembly line comedy caper".

== Remakes ==
The film's commercial success led to remakes in several languages, such as:

Year	Language	Title	Notes
2003	Telugu	Pellam Oorelithe	
2005	Hindi	No Entry	
2010	Malayalam	Happy Husbands	
2011	Kannada	Kalla Malla Sulla	
2012	Marathi	No Entry Pudhe Dhoka Aahey	
2016	Bengali	Kelor Kirti	

== Sequel ==
A sequel titled Charlie Chaplin 2 released in 2019.
