= Kunal Singh =

Indian actor (1977–2008)

Kunal
- Born: Kunal Singh; 29 September 1976; Haryana, India
- Died: 7 February 2008 (aged 31); Mumbai, Maharashtra, India
- Occupation: Actor
- Years active: 1999–2008
- Organization: Balagiri (Film production company)
- Children: 2

Kunal Singh (29 September 1976 – 7 February 2008), known professionally as Kunal, was an Indian actor who worked mainly in Tamil cinema. He is best known for his romantic role in Kathir's Kadhalar Dhinam (1999), which is his debut film.

== Career ==
Kunal was born on 29 September 1976 in Haryana, India. He was introduced in Kathir's 1999 romantic Tamil film Kadhalar Dhinam, alongside Sonali Bendre, a popular Bollywood actress that time. Kunal played a young student who falls in love with Bendre's character over the internet. Due to Bendre's popularity in north India, the film was partially reshot and dubbed into Hindi as Dil Hi Dil Mein.

After the relative success of Kadhalar Dhinam, Kunal appeared in a series of successful Tamil films like Paarvai Ondre Pothume (2001) and Punnagai Desam (2002), the latter being his first multi-starrer film.

After co-starring with Manoj K. Bharathi in Varushamellam Vasantham (2002), Kunal then appeared in many flops like Pesadha Kannum Pesume, Enge Enadhu Kavithai and Unarchigal. Several of his later films were started and then shelved, like Nava's Nilavinilae opposite Vijayalakshmi, Kimu Kipi opposite Susan, and Rithik's Kadhalithal Anandam, which would have featured him alongside Livingston and Kausalya. Moreover, two films which he had signed opposite actress Sherin Shringar, Jai Adithya's Kadhal Thiruda and Nanda's Thodu, were shot and unreleased.

When he was unable to find roles as an actor, he served as assistant editor for several films and turned to producing. Kunal's last Tamil film was Nanbanin Kadhali, which released in 2007.

== Personal life ==
Kunal was married and had two children. He was a black belt in karate.

== Death ==
On 7 February 2008, Kunal was found hanging from the ceiling in his Mumbai apartment. The apparent suicide was challenged by his father Rajendra Singh who claimed that the body showed signs of suspicious bruising. Actress Lavina Bhatia was detained by police in connection with his death, but she was later released after the police could not prove a motive. The police were unable to prove that anyone was present in Kunal's apartment at the time of his death and ruled out Bhatia as a suspect; furthermore, Kunal had attempted suicide by slashing his wrists several months earlier. At the time of his death, Kunal was working on a Hindi film, Yogi, which was being produced by his newly formed production company Balagiri. The case was referred to CBI and Prof T D Dogra of All India Institute of Medical Sciences. He examined the scene of crime along with CBI and opined in favour of suicide.Moreover, the Bombay High Court had ordered the suspension of 2 cops for their shoddy probe in the actor's demise.

== Filmography ==
- All films are in Tamil, unless otherwise noted.

Year	Film	Role	Notes
1999	Kadhalar Dhinam	Raja	
2000	Dil Hi Dil Mein	Raja	Hindi film; partially reshot version of Kadhalar Dhinam
2001	Paarvai Ondre Pothume	Vinodh	
2002	Punnagai Desam	Raja	
2002	Varushamellam Vasantham	Ramesh	
2002	Pesadha Kannum Pesume	Vikram	
2002	Enge Enadhu Kavithai	Babu	
2002	Arputham	Arvind	
2004	Super Da	Rahul	
2005	Devathaiyai Kanden	Bala	
2005	Pesuvoma	Elango	
2005	Thirudiya Idhayathai	Ganesh	
2005	Saadhuriyan	Ganesh	
2005	Sorry Enaku Kalyanamayidichu	Vijay	
2006	Unarchigal	Lakshmi's husband	
2007	Nanbanin Kadhali	Suryaprakash	
