= Kadhalar Dhinam =

1999 film by Kathir

- Theatrical release poster
- Directed by: Kathir
- Written by: Kathir
- Produced by: A. M. Rathnam
- Starring: Kunal; Sonali Bendre
- Cinematography: P. C. Sreeram
- Edited by: B. Lenin; V. T. Vijayan
- Music by: A. R. Rahman
- Production company: Sri Surya Movies
- Release date: 9 July 1999
- Running time: 151 minutes
- Country: India
- Language: Tamil

Kadhalar Dhinam (/kɑːðələr ðinəm/ transl. Lovers' day) is a 1999 Indian Tamil-language romance film written and directed by Kathir. Produced by A. M. Rathnam of Sri Surya Movies, the film stars Kunal and Sonali Bendre in the lead roles, while Nassar, Manivannan, Goundamani and Chinni Jayanth play supporting roles. The film follows two youngsters whose romance begins through an internet chatroom but is threatened when the hero has second thoughts after discovering his lover's true identity.

Kadhalar Dhinam is the debut film for Kunal and the first Tamil film for Bendre. It features music composed by A. R. Rahman with cinematography by P. C. Sreeram and editing by B. Lenin and V. T. Vijayan. The film was released on 9 July 1999 and was also dubbed in Telugu as Premikula Roju, which was released simultaneously. The film received positive reviews and was a commercial success. A simultaneous partially reshot but mostly dubbed Hindi version, Dil Hi Dil Mein, was later released on 21 April 2000.

== Plot ==
Raja is from a poor, illiterate family from Tamil Nadu. People from his region consider that education is meant only for the rich. There, poor boys are made to work from age five, either at factories or farms, so that they can support their families. Raja's dad is a violent alcoholic. He spends half of the family's income on alcohol. Raja's family struggles to survive every day. But Raja's mother forces his father to let Raja finish graduation, without doing any other work. But he refuses to fund him and orders him to start work as an accountant for their landlord. Raja's mother begs him to move to Mumbai to start a new life. Raja heeds his mother's pleas and moves to Mumbai to attend a Post Graduate Entrance Exam at Ramachandra Institute of Management Studies, the top-most premier business school in India.

The film starts at a train station on New Year Day 1999. Raja talks with a manager / veteran colonel named Manivannan in the station. The film transitions to a flashback; three years ago, he reaches Mumbai, where he plans to get admitted into the prestigious Ramachandra College of management. He gains admission for an MBA program at the Ramachandra College in Mumbai, where only the top 40 students get admission; in reality, Raja was ranked 41st, although the college chairman, Dr. Ramachandra, arranges for Raja's admission, although Raja is unaware of his true ranking. This was because Ramachandra saw Raja sleeping on the same enclave-side bench where he had slept 40 years ago when he too had nothing. Ramachandra was born to a poor illiterate family and his father abandoned them after his sister's birth. Due to her son's desire to become a student, his mother rented her baby daughter out to men in order to pay for school fees, although the baby dies from the ordeal. His sister's death pushes Ramachandra to create the best institute in India by hard work. As a chairman, he raised his daughter in a humble manner all alone after the death of his wife.

Raja meets Roja through the Internet. After a brief introduction, Raja and Roja started loving each other. They have yet to see each other and thus, they sent their pictures through e-mail to each other. As Roja checks her e-mail and sees Raja's photo, Raja enters the Net Cafe where Roja was. Then, they meet each other. They are initially shocked by seeing each other as Roja told him that she is in America and Raja told her that he is in London, although they were both in India and are studying at the same college.

The very next day, Raja meets Roja again in the train station where he usually comes to board the train. Again, they are both surprised and were speechless when they saw each other. However, things take a turn for the bad when they are both unable to express their feelings about each other due to fated accidents. Raja wanted to see if Roja really liked him by asking her to wear a rose on her head. However, as she walks towards the train station, her rose drops off. Unaware of this, Raja believes that Roja really does not like him. Ramachandra meets him and tells him to be practical. He suggests that Raja should write her a love letter. As Raja does not know how to write one, Ramachandra helps him. Even his daughter, Roja, helps him write a letter for Raja, unaware that it was for Raja that the father was writing it.

The next day, Raja meets her in the train station and gives her his books, with the love letter inside of it. Not knowing why he gave her his books, she just skims through his books, accidentally causing his love letter to fly away. However, Roja does write a love letter to him too. As she returns his books, a long-lost friend of Raja meets him on the train station. Raja writes the address on the first page of the book and tears it off to give to his friend. Unfortunately, he was not aware that Roja wrote her love letter right behind it. He feels disappointed and does not show interest to Roja, causing her to think that he does not like her.

Ramachandra comes to the rescue again and asks Raja to write another love letter and give it to her the next day, which happens to be Lover's Day. When Raja comes to express his love for Roja, he finds out that Roja is the daughter of Ramachandra, who has decided to fix his daughter up with Rajesh Gupta, a smart and wealthy golf player who completed his MBA degree in America. Rajesh's father owns the second best private university in India and wants to merge his with Ramachandra's. Roja makes a last attempt to find out if Raja likes her or not and she sends him an e-mail stating that she loves him. On the other hand, Raja does not want to hurt the feelings of his beloved guide and philosopher, whom he respects as his god-father. Thus, he sends her an e-mail stating that he is unable to return his feelings for Roja. Roja begrudgingly agrees to the wedding, assuming that Raja will never fall in love with her.

Raja comes to the wedding, but leaves the hall to go back to his hometown, which goes back to the beginning of the film. Coincidentally, Ramachandra overhears his conversation between Raja and his friends and realises that Raja is in love with his daughter. He goes to the train station to stop Raja, asking him to return and propose to Roja. Raja and Ramachandra reach the wedding hall on time, but as they make their way, Roja faints due to ingesting poison in a suicide attempt. Raja comes to rescue Roja and she is saved.

The film ends with Raja writing a 'thank you' letter to Manivannan and the date of his wedding with Roja on 1999's Lovers Day.

== Cast ==
- Kunal as Raja
- Sonali Bendre as Roja
- Nassar as Dr. Ramachandra, Roja's father
- Goundamani as Jack, a college professor
- Chinni Jayanth as Mandi, Raja's friend
- Manivannan as Colonel Manivannan
- Periyar Dasan as Raja's father
- Kalpana Iyer as Raja's mother
- Ragasudha as Roja's friend
- Arvind Kathare as Suresh Balaji, Raja's friend
- Kovai Senthil as Dharavi resident
- Rambha (special appearance in the song "Oh Mariyaa")

Uncredited

- Lekha Washington as a girl at the computer in "Oh Mariyaa"
- Mohan Vaidya as a singer on chariot in the song "Nenaichchapadi"
- Saakshi Siva as one of the palanquin carriers in the song "Roja Roja"

Hindi version

- Anupam Kher as Colonel Enayathulla
- Johnny Lever as Jack
- Raju Shrestha as Raju

== Production ==
Kathir, being an inveterate surfer of the cyber cafés of Chennai and Bangalore, decided to make a film on what he felt the internet could develop and be used for – romance. He initially titled the film as Lovers Day and began pre-production work in 1997, before giving the project a Tamil title, Kadhalar Dhinam. Kathir got to visit a newly opened cyber café in Bangalore and the "way that picture downloaded, slowly, frame by frame, was mind-blowing. Something struck me and I rushed out to write the basic one-liner of Kadhalar Dhinam". Since producer A. M. Rathnam was not aware of the internet, Kathir created a comedy track including Goundamani "to make it reach audiences". Goundamani's character, including his hairstyle, were inspired by Leonardo DiCaprio's character Jack from Titanic (1997).

Shaam was amongst the auditionees for the debut lead role, before Kunal Singh was selected after Kathir spotted him outside a Bangalore cyber café. Singh was in Bangalore only to bulk up his body before joining the army, but with the offer chose to make a career in films. Kathir had scouted for a non-Tamil actress to play the female lead and subsequently Bollywood actress Sonali Bendre was signed on to play Kunal's lover, making her major debut in Tamil films. Isha Koppikar had also been considered for the film, but after finalising Bendre, Kathir then recommended her to his friend K. S. Ravi to cast her in his En Swasa Kaatre (1999). For the launch of the film, the makers flew in models Lara Dutta, Laila Rouass and Rani Jeyraj to attend the launch event of the film. Rambha appeared in an item number in the film. For a song sequence, red rose petals were used to cover the forecourt of the Taj Mahal in Agra.

For the Hindi version Dil Hi Dil Mein, Anupam Kher, Johnny Lever, and Raju Shreshta partially replaced Manivannan, Goundamani, and Chinni Jayanth, respectively.

== Soundtrack ==
All lyrics are written by Vaali; all music is composed by A. R. Rahman.

Kadhalar Dhinam (Tamil) - (Original soundtrack)
No.	Title	Singer(s)	Length
1.	"Daandiyaa Aattamumaada"	Kavita Krishnamurthy, Unni Menon & M. G. Sreekumar	6:58
2.	"Enna Vilaiyazhagae"	Unni Menon	5:55
3.	"Kadhalenum Thervezhudhi"	S. P. Balasubrahmanyam & Swarnalatha	6:43
4.	"Nenaichchapadi"	M. G. Sreekumar, Srinivas, Ganga Sitharasu & Kanchana	7:45
5.	"Oh Mariya"	Devan Ekambaram, Yugendran & Febi Mani	6:23
6.	"Roja Roja"	P. Unnikrishnan	5:48
7.	"Roja Roja" (sad)	Hariharan	0:56

All lyrics are written by Mehboob Kotwal; all music is composed by A. R. Rahman.

Dil Hi Dil Mein (Hindi)
No.	Title	Singer(s)	Length
1.	"Chand Aaya Hai"	Kavita Krishnamurthy, Udit Narayan	6:58
2.	"Ae Nazneen Suno Na"	Abhijeet Bhattacharya	5:58
3.	"Dola Dola (Imtihan Hum Pyar Ka Deke)"	Srinivas, Swarnalatha	6:44
4.	"Sawar Gayee"	Udit Narayan, Srinivas	7:45
5.	"Oh Mariya"	Remo Fernandes, Febi Mani	6:21
6.	"Roja Roja"	Hariharan	5:49

All lyrics are written by A. M. Ratnam, Siva Ganesh.

Premikula Roju (Telugu)
No.	Title	Singer(s)	Length
1.	"Dhaandiya"	M. G. Sreekumar, Unni Menon, Kavita Krishnamurthy	6:58
2.	"Vaalu Kannuladaana"	Unni Menon	5:59
3.	"Prema Ane"	Swarnalatha, S. P. Balasubrahmanyam	6:44
4.	"Manasu Padi"	Srinivas, M. G. Sreekumar	7:44
5.	"Oh Mariya"	Devan Ekambaram, Yugendran, Febi Mani	6:21
6.	"Roja Roja"	P. Unnikrishnan	5:47
7.	"Roja Roja" (sad)	P. Unnikrishnan	0:56

== Release and reception ==
Kadhalar Dhinam was released on 9 July 1999. The film initially featured a different climax where Roja dies after taking tablets, but after release, the film was altered to give a happy ending. K. N. Vijiyan of New Straits Times wrote, "This is a good movie for lovers and those who just want to pass time. Net-surfers will find the goings-on interesting". K. P. S. of Kalki wrote that Kathir gave "www touch" to the same old love story of Tamil cinema, and music and cinematography makes this old story look like a new film. D. S. Ramanujam of The Hindu wrote, "A team of highly qualified technicians such as music director, A. R. [Rahman], cinematographer P. C. [Sreeram], art director Thota Tharani and editors Lenin and V. T. Vijayan has contributed largely to give gloss to director Kathir's screenplay". Reviewing the Telugu version Premikula Roju, Jeevi of Idlebrain.com said, "First half of the movie is pretty dull and second half is very gripping. It will appeal only to urbane viewers" and felt it could have been edited down to a shorter length.
