= Paarvai Ondre Pothume =

2001 film by Murali Krishna

- DVD cover
- Directed by: Murali Krishna
- Written by: Murali Krishna
- Produced by: A. Rajpal
- Starring: Kunal; Monal; Karan
- Cinematography: Sri Shankar
- Edited by: B.S.Vasu–Saleem
- Music by: Bharani
- Production company: Amutha Movie Makers
- Release date: 16 March 2001
- Running time: 132 minutes
- Country: India
- Language: Tamil

Paarvai Ondre Pothume (transl. A Glance is Enough) is a 2001 Indian Tamil-language romance film written and directed by Murali Krishna. The film stars late Kunal, late Monal and Karan in the lead roles. The film's soundtrack was composed by Bharani. The film was released on 16 March 2001 and became a commercial success.

== Plot ==
Vinodh and Manoj are best friends. Manoj gives Vinodh a managerial job in his three-star hotel. They both are in love with Neetha, but Neetha is only in love with Vinodh. This causes a strain in their friendship, and Manoj fires Vinodh from his job. The film ends with a message to the audience that "love is divine (pleasing) but friendship is pristine (unspoilt)".

== Cast ==
- Kunal as Vinodh
- Monal as Neetha
- Karan as Manoj
- Ramji as Manoj's friend
- Fathima Babu as Visalakshi, Vinodh's mother
- Dhamu as Gopal, Manoj's coworker
- Vaiyapuri as Guru, Manoj's coworker
- Balu Anand as Murugan, Manoj's home servant
- Alphonsa (special appearance in "Nee Paarthuttu Ponaalum")

== Production ==
Two songs were shot at Pollachi.

== Soundtrack ==
The soundtrack was composed by Bharani.

Song title	Singer(s)	Lyric(s)	Length
"Thuli Thuliyaai Kottum Mazhai"	Hariharan, Swarnalatha	Pa. Vijay	6:07
"Kaadhal Pannaadheenga"	Krishnaraj	Bharani	1:19
Theme Music, "Dhumthakku Dhumthakku"	Krishnaraj, Malgudi Subha, Sumitra	Bharani	1:32
"Nee Paarthuttu Ponaalum"	Krishnaraj, Sumitra	Bharani	4:10
"Thirudiya Idhayathai Thiruppi"	Harish Raghavendra, K. S. Chithra	Bharani	4:51
"Thirumba Thirumba"	Harini, P. Unnikrishnan	Pa. Vijay	5:17
"Yen Asaindhaadum"	S. Janaki, P. Unnikrishnan	Pa. Vijay	5:16

== Reception ==
Malini Mannath of Chennai Online wrote "Not much variation can be brought in this subject, but the director has seen that his narration is neat, the scenes move smoothly and the songs appear at the right places". Cinesouth wrote "There is no depth in the story. Neither the screenplay is clear. One has to pity the plight of the director! It is a heavy assault on the audiences. But there are two redeeming factors: The free-flowing histrionic talents of Karan and the scintillating songs of Bharani". K. N. Vijiyan of New Straits Times wrote, "Cinematography is only passable with some shots out of focus [...] This movie is only for those who are curious about Monal and those who lost their hearts to Kunal in Kadhalar Dhinam.".
