= Viveka (lyricist) =

Indian lyricist

Viveka is an Indian lyricist working on Tamil language films. His debut movie was Nee Varuvai Ena. Vivega has worked on over 2000+ songs.

== Awards ==
- 2022: Received title of Kalaimamani Award by the Government of Tamil Nadu, which is the highest state honour in the field of Arts

== Filmography ==
=== As a song lyricist ===
Year	Film	Songs	Composer
1999	Nee Varuvai Ena	"Poonkuyil Paattu"	S. A. Rajkumar
1999	Unakkaga Ellam Unakkaga	"Cleopatra", "Monalisa" "Thulli Thulli"	Yuvan Shankar Raja
1999	Paattali	"Chinna Chinna Veettu"	S. A. Rajkumar
1999	Kadhal Solla Vandhen	"Monica Monica"	Deva
2000	Vaanathaippola	"Mainave Mainave"	S. A. Rajkumar
2000	James Pandu	"Un Azhagai"	S. A. Rajkumar
2000	Kandha Kadamba Kathir Vela	"Pathu Mani Aachu"	S. A. Rajkumar
2000	Kuberan	"Rosave Rosave", "Vennilava", "Kadhalikkum", "Aanandha Roja"	S. A. Rajkumar
2001	Vinnukum Mannukum	"Aagaya Pookkal"	Sirpy
2001	Sri Raja Rajeshwari	"Raasave Ennai"	Deva
2001	Aanandham	"Enna Ithuvo"	S. A. Rajkumar
2001	Ninaikkatha Naalillai	"Brahma Brahma"	Deva
2001	Kadhal Galatta	"Kadhal Kacheri"	Mani Sharma
2001	Samudhiram	"Vidiya Vidiya"	Sabesh-Murali
2001	Mitta Miraasu	"Mitta Mirasu"	Aslam Mustafa
2002	Punnagai Desam	"Ennai Paada Vaitha"	S. A. Rajkumar
2002	Ammaiyappa	"Magaraani Mappillaiyoda", "En swasame", "Vennilavai Thottu"	Venkatesh
2002	Saptham	"Ooruni Oorukku", "Kanava Nenaiva", "En Peyar Enakke"	Gana-Lal
2002	Shakalaka Baby	"Senyo Reeta"	S. A. Rajkumar
2002	Naina	"Pallikoodam Sellum Megame", "Kaadhalanae Uyire"	Sabesh-Murali
2002	Kadhal Sugamandhu	"Sollathaan Ninaikkiren (Male)", "Sollathaan Ninakikkiren (Female)", "Vechiruka", "Ezhu Jenmangal", "Mutham Mutham Kodu", "Adi Sugama Sugama"	Shiva Shankar
2002	Thamizh	"Kadhalennum Jorula"	Bharadwaj
2002	Run	"Minsaram En Meedu Paikinrathe"	Vidyasagar
2002	Jjunction	"Shopping Pogum"	Bharadwaj
2002	Five Star	"Five Star Five Star"	Sriram Parasuram, Anuraadha Sriram
2003	Kadhaludan	"Ithuvarai Yarum", "Pookalin Kathinile", "Uchi Kilaiyilae", "Unnai Thinam"	S. A. Rajkumar
2003	Success	"Hey Un Vayasanna"	Deva
2003	Winner	"Kozhi Kokkara"	Yuvan Shankar Raja
2003	Anbu Thollai	"Kalyanam Unakenna", "Iruke Pudingalen"	
2004	Kadhal Dot Com	"Athai Ponne", "Pacha Thanni"	Bharadwaj
2004	Arasatchi	"Chant of Arasatchi", "Irupathu Vayathu"	Harris Jayaraj
2004	Vayasu Pasanga	"Kamanga Kattu Pasanga"	R.K.Sundar
2004	Campus	"Kunguma Poove", "Cola Cola"	Rajaneesh
2005	Aayudham	"Aalakala Visham"	Dhina
2005	Ji	"Vamba Velaikku", "Sarala Kondaiyil"	Vidyasagar
2005	Sudesi	"Kaaya Pazhamaa"	Srikanth Deva
2005	Sevvel	"Thenpothigai"	Aasan
2005	Priyasakhi	"Kangalinal"	Bharadwaj
2005	Thullum Kaalam	"Sembaruthi Poochedikku", "Arubathu Vayathil"	S.P. Boopathi
2005	Veeranna	"Thaali Kaluthula"	Soudharyan
2005	Daas	"Sakka Podu"	Yuvan Shankar Raja
2006	Kalinga	"Mazhai Saaralai", "Kaapathungo"	D. Imman
2006	Chennai Kadhal	"Saladai Saladai Pottu"	Joshua Sridhar
2006	Unakkum Enakkum	"Kozhi Veda Kozhi"	Devi Sri Prasad
2006	E	"Orey Murai"	Srikanth Deva
2006	Thiruvilaiyaadal Aarambam	"Adrarama", "Madurai Jilla", "Vizhigalil Vizhigalil"	D. Imman
2006	Kumaran	"Oru Bambaram"	Harris Jayaraj
2007	Parattai Engira Azhagu Sundaram	"Chikku Bukku"	Gurukiran
2007	Pallikoodam	"Kaadu Padhungurome", "9 Manikku 9 Manikku"	Bharadwaj
2007	Nenjai Thodu	"En Thaai Aval", "LKG", "Puthu Vaasam"	Srikanth Deva
2008	Tharagu	"Tharagu Vela"	Bharani
2008	Santosh Subramaniam	"America Yendralum", "Yeppadi Irundha Yen Manasu"	Devi Sri Prasad
2008	Pidichirukku	"Yaaridam Naan", "En Kadhale"	Manu Ramesan
2008	Raman Thediya Seethai	"Ippave Ippave"	Vidyasagar
2008	Dhik Dhik	"Ding Ding", "Issukumela", "Yennai Vaattuthe"	D. Imman
2008	Kaathavarayan	"Ponguppa Ponguppa"	Srikanth Deva
2008	Ini Varum Kaalam	"Kaalaiyil Enthiruchu", "Eppa Unnna Pathalum"	Bharani
2008	Inba	"Maya Kalli", "Soora Thenga"	P.B. Balaji
2009	Villu	"Daddy Mummy"	Devi Sri Prasad
2009	Gaja	"Kan Pesum Azhagu"	Mani Sharma
2009	Newtonin Moondram Vidhi	"Ummachi", "Newtonin Moondram Vidhi"	F.S.Faizal
2009	Thoranai	"Vedi Vedi Saravedi"	Mani Sharma
2009	Maasilamani	"Chikku Chikku Boom Boom"	D. Imman
2009	Solla Solla Inikkum	"Kadhal Oru Pallikoodam", "Hey Azhagiya Penne"	Bharadwaj
2009	Kanthaswamy	"Excuse me Mr.Kanthaswamy", "Meow Meow Poona", "En peru meenakumaari", "Mambo Maamiya", "Alegro", "Kandha Kandha Kanthswamy (Theme Song)", "Ithellan Dupe", "Kanthaswamy DSP mix"	Devi Sri Prasad
2009	Eeram	"Mazhaiye Mazhaiye", "Tharai erangiya", "Saaral yen"	S. Thaman
2009	Naan Avanillai 2	"Baaga Unnara", "Thooyavaney"	D. Imman
2009	Balam	"Devathaiye (SPB)", "Devathaiye (Yugendhran Harini)", "Kanavula Paathain", "Jingunamani"	Yugendhran
2009	Vettaikaaran	"Chinna Thamarai"	Vijay Antony
2009	Naai Kutty	"Eppo Patheno", "Kola Kolaiya", "Kadhalikum Pengaluku"	Vijayabharathi
2009	Kandhakottai	"Eppadi Ennul Kadhal", "Dishyum Dishyum"	Dhina
2010	Kutty	"Life A Jaali Than", "Feel My Love", "Kannu Rendum"	Devi Sri Prasad
2010	Pugaippadam	"Odaikanum Odaikanum", "Padapadavena"	Gangai Amaran
2010	Milaga	"Nee Sirichi Paakura"	Sabesh-Murali
2010	Kacheri Arambam	"Azhagu Azhagu", "Kacheri Kacheri"	D. Imman
2010	Mundhinam Paartheney	"Pesum Poove"	S. Thaman
2010	Maanja Velu	"Oh My Dear"	Mani Sharma
2010	Singam	"Naane Indhiran", "Stole My Heart", "Kadhal Vandhale"	Devi Sri Prasad
2010	Thillalangadi	"Ding Ding", "Memory Loss", "Thothu Ponen", "Pootta Paathadhum", "Idhayam Karaikirathe"	Yuvan Shankar Raja, S. Thaman
2010	Vandae Maatharam	"Thirumbi Thirumbi"	D. Imman
2010	Thottupaar	"Thottu Thottu", "Usurula"	Srikanth Deva
2010	Mandhira Punnagai	"Thanni Poda Vaapa (Club Viveka mix)", "Thanni Poda Vaapa"	Vidyasagar
2010	Ayyanar	"Pachai Kili"	S. Thaman
2010	Agam Puram	"Kangalai Parthidum"	Sundar C. Babu
2010	Aattanayagann	"Onnarooba"	Srikanth Deva
2010	Kotti	All Songs	
2010	Manmadhan Ambu	"Oyyale"	Devi Sri Prasad
2011	Siruthai	"Azhaga Poranthuputta"	Vidyasagar
2011	Kaavalan	"Step Step"	Vidyasagar
2011	Thambikottai	"Thambikottai Kanaga", "Unnakaaga Uyirai Vaithen", "Vaa Pulla", "Noorandu Vazhga", "Pain of Love"	D. Imman
2011	Aadu Puli	"Boyse Google"	Sundar C Babu
2011	Singam Puli	"Figaru", "Poove Poove", "Naadila"	Mani Sharma
2011	Mappillai	"Aaru Padai"	Mani Sharma
2011	Ko	"Amali Thumali"	Harris Jayaraj
2011	Sankarankovil	"Manushana Manushan"	Rajini
2011	Venghai	"Dhenam Dhenam", "Kaalangathale", "Orey Oru", "Pudikala Pudikuthu"	Devi Sri Prasad
2011	Kaasethan Kadavulada	"Paratha Kaatunga", "Nainavukku", "Unnai Orumurai", "Discovukku", "Kaasethan Kadavulada"	Karunas
2011	Muni 2: Kanchana	"Sangili Bungili", "Karuppu Perazhaga", "Kodiavanin Kadhaya"	S. Thaman
2011	Puli Vesham	"Chennai Gana"	Srikanth Deva
2011	Mathikettaan Saalai	"Naadu Summa Kidathalum"	Srikanth Deva
2011	Vedi	"Bombay Ponnu"	Vijay Antony
2011	Vellore Maavattam	"Kannala Parkurathum"	Sundar C. Babu
2011	Velayudham	"Molachu Moonu", "Maayam Seidhayo"	Vijay Antony
2011	Maharaja	"Adida Dammaaram"	D. Imman
2012	Nanban	"En Frienda Pola"	Harris Jayaraj
2012	Nanda Nanditha	"Iyya Raasa", "Jimke Marina"	Emil Mohammed
2012	Aravaan	"Oore More Enna Petha Oore"	Karthik
2012	Raattinam	"Asathum Azhagiri", "Yeno En Idhayam", "Yele Ye Pulla", "Yethu Yethu"	Manu Ramaesan
2012	Mayaginen Thayaginen	"Mayaginen Thayanginen (Sathya Prakash)", "Mayaginen Thayaginen (Thizhaga)"	Kannan
2012	Ragalai	"Ragalai Ragalai"	Mani Sharma
2012	Aathi Narayana	"Happy New Year", "Karuppayee"	Srikanth Deva
2012	Ishtam	"Oru Megam", "Enmele Indru"	S. Thaman
2012	Saguni	"Vella Bambaram"	G. V. Prakash Kumar
2012	Kozhi Koovuthu	"Ellarum Otha Sanam"	E.S Ramraj
2012	Maattrraan	"Naani Koni"	Harris Jayaraj
2012	Thuppakki	"Kutti Puli Koottam"	Harris Jayaraj
2012	Ramcharan	"Naanum Unnodu", "Oruvali Paathai"	Harris Jayaraj
2013	Alex Pandian	"Thakka Thaiyaa", "Naalu Pakkam"	Devi Sri Prasad
2013	Kanna Laddu Thinna Aasaiya	"Aasaiye"	S. Thaman
2013	Andava Perumal	All songs	Ravichandran
2013	Singam II	"Vaale Vaale", "Puriyavillai", "Achamillai", "Singam Dance", "Vidhai Pola", "Kannukkulle"	Devi Sri Prasad
2013	Ya Ya	"Friende Podhum", "Oru Kannadiya", "Neethanae Endru", "Nothing Want", "Bhoomi Nalla", "Yaaru Kitta"	Vijay Ebenezer
2013	Meiyyazhagi	"En Pera Nana Maranthaenada"	Abishek
2013	Ego	"Mattikitten"	Dhina
2013	Ivan Veramathiri	"Malaya Porattala", "Thanimayile", "Loveula Loveula"	C. Sathya
2013	Azhagan Azhagi	"Ethuvarai Vaanam"	Kannan
2013	Oruvar Meethu Iruvar Saainthu	"Vizhiyaal Vizhiyaal", "Devathaipol Ponnuda"	Shiva
2013	Kan Pesum Vaarthaigal	"Madhi Vadhani", "Peyar illa Mozhiyilae (Vijay Yesudas, Harini)", "Aaram Arivilae", "Kopayil", "Kan Pesum Vaarthai", "Peyar Illa Mozhiyilae (Shravya, Yashwanth)"	Shamanth
2013	Arya Surya	"Vada Poche", "Mama Mama"	Srikanth Deva
2013	Naiyaandi	"Teddy Bear"	Ghibran
2013	Apple Penne	"Paadu Paadu"	Mani Sharma
2013	Kolagalam	"Kannula Unna", "Sema Sema", "Yelea Yelea"	Bharani
2013	Endrendrum Punnagai	"Yealae Yealae Dosthu", "Ennatha Solla"	Harris Jayaraj
2013	Iruvar Ullam	"Aadum Nenje", "Udalgal Irandum"	Vijay Antony
2014	Veeram	"Radha Gaja Thuraga", "Nallavannu Solvanga", "Ival Thaana", "Thangamae Thangamae", "Jing Chikka Jing Chikka", "Veeram Theme"	Devi Sri Prasad
2014	Kalavaram	"Engaeyum Eppothum"	F.S.Faizal
2014	Jilla	"Jingunamani", "Yeppa Mama Treatu", "Jilla Theme"	D. Imman
2014	Kandharvan	"Kadhal Oru Pattaampoochi"	Alex Paul
2014	Bramman	"En Uyirin Uyiraga", "Vaada Vaada"	Devi Sri Prasad
2014	Ennamo Nadakkudhu	"Meesa Kokkudhan"	Premgi Amaran
2014	Adhuvera Idhuvera	"Chinnathaaga Morachiputa", "Mickey Mouse paatha", "Atom Bomb Baby"	Taj Noor
2014	Vallinam	"Maaman Machaan", "Uyiril Uyiril", "Uyiril Uyiril (Reprise)"	S. Thaman
2014	Tenaliraman	"Aanazhagu", "Aey Vaayadi", "Udal Vaangalaiyo", "Nenje Nenje"	D. Imman
2014	Anjaan	"Oru Kan Jaadai", "Sirippu"	Yuvan Shankar Raja
2014	Azhagiya Pandipuram	"Orakkannale", "Kattazhagi", "Pada Pada"	Bharadwaj
2014	Sutrula	"Azhai Azhai Pesi"	Bharani
2014	Vaa Deal	" Pesi Pesi", "Vaa Deal"	S. Thaman
2015	Sagaptham	"Oorukku Perumai", "Vaada Vaada"	Karthik Raja
2015	Muni 3: Kanchana 2	"Sandimuni", "Motta Paiyaa", "Moda Moda"	Leon James, S. Thaman, Asvamitra
2015	Uttama Villain	"Loveaa Loveaa"	Ghibran
2015	Massu Engira Masilamani	"Semma Masss"	S. Thaman
2015	Eli	"Kannameya"	Vidyasagar
2015	Selvandhan	All songs	Devi Sri Prasad
2015	Bruce Lee 2: The Fighter	"Bruce Lee", "Kunfu Kumari", "Le Chalo", "Ria Ria"	Thaman S
2015	Andhadhi		Shamanath Nag
2015	Vedalam	"Veera Vinayaka" "Uyir Nadhi Kalangudhey"	Anirudh Ravichander
2016	Aarathu Sinam	"Thanimaye"	S. Thaman
2016	Narathan	"My Name Is Chandhrika" "Saaral Veesum"	Mani Sharma
2016	Oyee	"Eden Garden", "Mudinja Oru Kai", "Thendral Varum Vazhiyil"	Ilayaraja
2016	Dhilluku Dhuddu	"Dhilluku Dhuddu"	S. Thaman
2016	Nambiyaar	"Aara Amara" "Kaima Kaisa"	Vijay Antony
2016	Selvi	"Kaathil Kaathil"	Ghibran
2017	Singam III: Si3	"Universal Cop"	Harris Jayaraj
2017	Motta Shiva Ketta Shiva	"Shiva Vechitanda Kaala" "Lo Lo Lo Local"	Amresh Ganesh
2017	Shivalinga	"Rangu Rakkara", "Chinna Kabali", "Sirika Vechu", "Sivalinga", "Saarah Saarah"	S.Thaman
2017	Velaikkaran	"Karuthavenellam Galeejam" "Iraiva" "Ezhu Velaikkara"	Anirudh Ravichander
2018	Bharat Ennum Naan	All songs	Devi Sri Prasad
2018	Saamy Square	"Adhiroobaney" "Molagapodiye" "Amma Amma" "Darnakka"	Devi Sri Prasad
2018	Aan Devathai	"Rottu Kadai Party"	M. Ghibran
2019	Viswasam	Adchithooku, Vaaney Vaaney	D. Imman
2019	Yung Mung Sung		Amresh Ganesh
2019	Kadaram Kondan	"Tharame Tharame", "Thee Sudar Kuniyuma"	Ghibran
2019	Dhanusu Raasi Neyargale	"Murada Murada"	Ghibran
2019	Champion	"Manathin Saalayil", "Aandavan Thoorigayil"	Arrol Corelli
2020	Seeru	"Vaa Vaasuki" "Kannala Poduraaley"	D. Imman
2020	Shylock	"Kanne Kanne Veesathe"	Gopi Sundar
2021	Pushpa: The Rise – Part 1 (D)	"Srivalli (paarva karpura theebama)" "Oo solriya mama", "Saami Saami", "Odu Odu Aadu", Ey Beta ithu en Patta"	Devi Sri Prasad
2021	Annaatthe	"Annaatthe Annaatthe"	D. Imman
2021	Borrder	"Nenje Nenje"	Sam C. S.
2021	Theal	"Madhavi Ponmayilaaga"	C. Sathya
2022	Koogle Kuttappa	"Soorathenga"	Ghibran
2022	The Warriorr	"Bullet song", "Dhada Dhada", "Whistle song", "Colours song"	Devi Sri Prasad
2023	Thunivu	"Gangstaa"	Ghibran
2024	Guardian	"Mayakitta"	Sam C. S.
2024	Rathnam	"Don't worry", "Endha Uyirayum", "Ethanaala (Male)", "Ethanaala (Female)", "Porale", "Sengamalam", "Uyire En Uyire", "Vaarai Rathnam", "Yedhuvaraiyo"	Devi Sri Prasad
2024	Kanguva	"Fire Song", "YOLO", "Mannippu song"	Devi Sri Prasad
2024	Pushpa 2: The Rule (D)	"Pushpa Pushpa", "Soodaana", "Kissik", "Gangama Thaaye", "Peelings"	Devi Sri Prasad
2025	Retta Thala	"Kandara Kolli"	Sam C. S.
2025	Kuberaa	"Poyivaa Nanba", "Trance of Kuberaa", "Kadha Kadha Kadhai", "En Magane", "Yamathu Yamathu"	Devi Sri Prasad

=== Television ===
- 2010 Kodi Mullai
