= Thalaivan =

2014 Indian film by Ramesh Selvan

- Directed by: Ramesh Selvan
- Written by: Mohammed Jaffer
- Produced by: Chithirai Selvan
- Starring: Bas; Nikesha Patel; Santhanam
- Cinematography: S. K. Boopathy
- Edited by: Anthony
- Music by: Vidyasagar
- Production company: Blue Ocean Pictures
- Release date: 18 April 2014
- Country: India
- Language: Tamil

Thalaivan (transl. Leader) is a 2014 Indian Tamil film directed by Ramesh Selvan and produced by Chithirai Selvan. The film features Baskaran, the younger brother of politician T. T. V. Dhinakaran and Nikesha Patel in the lead roles, while the ensemble cast features Santhanam, Suman and Jayaprakash amongst others. The film was released on 18 April 2014.

== Plot ==
As the state police are busy eliminating the criminal gang of Daniel, a notorious terrorist, Thalaivan crops up as a bigger threat to the police department.

== Cast ==
- Baskaran as Bas
- Nikesha Patel as Anusha
- Santhanam as Kannan
- Monica
- Suman as DGP Sundarapandian
- Vincent Asokan
- Jayaprakash as Doctor
- Subbaraju as ACP
- Suresh Krishna
- Suman Setty
- Manobala
- Kovai Sarala
- VTV Ganesh
- Pandu
- Ilavarasu
- Santhana Bharathi
- Yuvarani
- Meera Krishnan
- Aarthi as Anusha's friend
- Vasu Vikram
- T. P. Gajendran
- Swaminathan as Professor
- O. A. K. Sundar as Muthukumar
- Ravi as Sivakumar
- Muthukaalai
- Munnar Ramesh
- Cool Suresh
- Abhishek
- Kota Srinivasa Rao (cameo appearance)
- Powerstar Srinivasan (cameo appearance)

== Production ==
The film is the home production of the newcomer lead comedian, V. Bhaskaran alias Bas, brother to politician T. T. V. Dhinakaran and a nephew of VK Sasikala. The actor is in his 40s and had previously been the managing director of J.Jayalalitha TV (JJTV) during J.Jayalalithaa's first term as chief minister between 1991 and 1996. He revealed his experience at JJTV created an ambition of him working as an actor and thus approached the producers of the MGR-starrer Thalaivan and sought permission to use their title in his new venture. Production began in July 2012 with Bas signing up a host of established cast and crew to join the team, including actors Santhanam, Suman and Jayaprakash while actresses Nikesha Patel and Sana Khan were signed on to play heroines. Sana Khan was later replaced by Monica in the cast, after she became busy with other projects. A technical team involving Ramesh Selvan of Ulavuthurai (1998) and Jananam (2004) as director, Anthony as editor and G. V. Prakash Kumar as composer was announced, although the composer later opted out and he was replaced by Vidyasagar.

The film was briefly delayed when Bas was arrested in June 2013 in a case of cheating a woman. In June 2013, the director Ramesh Selvan issued a press release distancing himself from the project, indicating that he had suffered health problems as a result of his strenuous work on the project and that he had to complete his other venture, Kalavaram (2014).

== Soundtrack ==
Thalaivan

Soundtrack album by Vidyasagar
- Released: 6 July 2013
- Recorded: Varsha Vallaki Studios
- Genre: Feature Film Soundtrack
- Length: 19:32
- Language: Tamil
- Label: Sony Music India
- Producer: Vidyasagar

Vidyasagar chronology
| 3 Dots (2013) | Thalaivan (2013) | Puthiya Thiruppangal (2013) |

The film's soundtrack was composed by Vidyasagar. The audio launch was held in May 2013, with director Ameer felicitating the event.

- "Adaivaana" - Ranjith, Sricharan
- "Naan Manmathar" - Tippu, Priyasri
- "Oru Kodi" - K. J. Yesudas
- "Siru Paarvai" - Karthik, Vandana Srinivasan
- "Yaarai Kettu" - Sathyaprakash, Vandana Srinivasan

== Release ==
The film was released on 18 April 2014 alongside Thenaliraman and Damaal Dumeel to negative reviews. Times of india gave a review citing "If you can force yourself to ignore its leads, the film turns from being borderline terrible to a borderline watchable fare. This is a fairly interesting storyline for commercial film. [sic] But the plot points are telegraphed to us a mile earlier so there is no tension in the scenes.
