= Samskaravantha =

2009 Indian drama film

- Poster
- Directed by: K. Parthasarathi
- Screenplay by: K. Parthasarathi
- Story by: K. Parthasarathi
- Dialogues by: J. M. Prahlad
- Produced by: Raghunath
- Starring: Sanketh Kashi; Padma Vasanthi
- Cinematography: Elukoti Chandru
- Edited by: B. S. Kemparaju
- Music by: Sadguna Raj
- Production company: Sarathi-Nath Creators
- Release date: 13 February 2009
- Running time: 105 minutes
- Country: India
- Language: Kannada

Samskaravantha is a 2009 Indian Kannada-language drama film written and directed by K. Parthasarathi. The film stars Sanketh Kashi and Padma Vasanthi.

== Cast ==
- Sanketh Kashi
- Padma Vasanthi
- Suchendra Prasad
- Ninasam Ashwath
- Ragini Rao
- Rajeshwari
- M. P. Venkat Rao
- Venu
- Goa Datthu
- B. K. Shankar
- Preethi
- Keerthika Tharan
- C. R. Narasimhamurthy
- Rajkumar C. Kamble
- Pipeline Ramesh
- Manju
- Master Hemanth Rajkumar
- Baby Suchithra

== Production ==
The story of the film is based on the life of Trivikrama Mahadeva. The filmmakers obtained permission to use Mahadeva's life story, which includes his experiences as a mortician of unclaimed bodies. The filmmakers reportedly agreed to pay Mahadeva a fee in exchange for the right to use his story in Samskaravantha. However, Mahadeva claims that he was not paid by the producers of either Samskaravantha or KA-99 B-333, despite being promised compensation at the time the filmmakers obtained permission to use his story. Raghunath, the producer, stated that he had intended to provide compensation to Mahadeva. However, the amount Mahadeva requested was equivalent to half of the film's production cost, which was deemed excessive for a low-budget tribute film. Mahadeva has reportedly expressed indifference to the films, citing his dissatisfaction with the lack of compensation he received and stating that he has no interest in watching them.

== Soundtrack ==
The film has songs composed by Sadguna Raj.

All lyrics are written by J. M. Prahlad.

Track listing
No.	Title	Singer(s)	Length
1.	"Jakkanaka Jakkanaka"	Pradeep	2:48
2.	"Hakki Haritho"	Ajay Warrior	4:10
Total length:			6:58

== Reception ==
A critic from The Times of India rated the film two-and-a-half out of five stars and wrote, "While Kashi has done an excellent job, Padma Vasanthi is impressive and Suchendra Prasad is superb. Elukoti Chandru has done a good job as cameraman." A critic from Bangalore Mirror wrote, "The quality of production is shoddy in places and the background music becomes noise most times. Many bizarre incidents are dwelt with in just dialogues to cut down on costs. Even still the film comes across as a unique attempt at telling an unusual story. A good first time attempt by the director."
