= Srilekha Parthasarathy =

Indian actress and singer

- Born: Delhi, India
- Occupation: Singer
- Spouse: M. J. Shriram

Srilekha Parthasarathy is an Indian singer and actress in Tamil cinema. She is commonly referred to by her first name Srilekha. She began her professional career in 2000, when she recorded the jingle for the "Idhayam Oil" advertisement. She describes the jingle as her ticket into the Tamil film industry.

== Early life ==
Srilekha was born in a Tamil family and grew up in Delhi. She completed her schooling from DTEA Senior Secondary School, New Delhi. South Indian by birth, she learned both North and South Indian music, as well as Western music. At age four, she won first prize in the annual All India Children's Music Competition in New Delhi.

== Career ==
Her debut was with music director Harris Jayaraj, for the song called "Yedho Ondru" from the movie Lesa Lesa.

She recorded several songs for films, including "Poo Mugam Siricha" for the movie Junction, "Kaadhalaagi" with S.P. Balasubramaniam in Pop Carn, "Don't worry be Happy" for the movie Whistle, and "Sutthi Sutthi Varuven" for the movie Sena.

She later recorded "Kalyaanam dhaan" from the movie Saamy. This was followed by "Vinodhane" from Thennavan, "Vaa Masakatre" from Kurumbu and "Ayurvedha Azhagi" from Thiruda Thirudi.

Her more recent recordings include "Dhimsu Kattai", "Chinna Veeda", "Kokku Meena Thinguma" and "Pacchakili Pacchakili". Other songs of Srilekha include "Mummy Chellama", "Bambara Kannu", "Vecchukka Vecchukka Va", "Garuda Garuda", and "Thavilu Thavilu".

She appeared in STAR Vijay's drama serial Dharmayutham. She is married to singer M J Shriram.

== Discography ==
=== Tamil movie songs ===
Songs she has sung in Tamil movies:

Year	Film	Song	Composer	Co-singer(s)
2002	Jjunction	"Poo Mugam Siricha"	Bharadwaj	Balram
2003	Lesa Lesa	"Yedho Ondru"	Harris Jayaraj	Harish Raghavendra, Franko
2003	Pop Carn	"Kathalaaki Kaninthathu"	Yuvan Shankar Raja	S. P. Balasubrahmanyam
2003	Thennavan	"Vinodhane" – II	Yuvan Shankar Raja	Srinivas
2003	Thirumalai	"Dhimsu Katta"	Vidyasagar	Tippu
2003	Saamy	"Kalyanamthaan"	Harris Jayaraj	KK, Yugendran
2003	Sena	"Suthi Suthi Varuven"	D. Imman	Tippu
2003	Whistle	"Don't Worry Be Happy"	D. Imman	
2003	Thiruda Thirudi	"Ayurveda Azhagi"	Dhina	Manikka Vinayagam
2003	Ottran	"Chinna Veeda"	Pravin Mani	Manikka Vinayagam
2003	Kurumbu	"Vaa Masakaatre"	Yuvan Shankar Raja	Srinivas, Harish Raghavendra, Subiksha
2003	Aalukkoru Aasai	"Kaathal Kaathal"	S. A. Rajkumar	Kalpana, S. A. Rajkumar
2004	Kovil	"Kokku Meenai"	Harris Jayaraj	Shankar Mahadevan
2004	Aethiree	"Saithane Saithane"	Yuvan Shankar Raja	Shankar Mahadevan
2004	Madurey	"Bambarakannu"	Vidyasagar	Udit Narayan
2004	Arasatchi	"Kozhaa Puttu Penney"	Harris Jayaraj	Palakkad Sreeram
2004	Kuthu	"Pachai Kili"	Srikanth Deva	Kunal Ganjawala
2004	Jananam	"Ore Oru Mutham"	Bharadwaj	Karthik
2004	Jore	"Mummy Chellamma"	Deva	Srikanth Deva
2004	M. Kumaran Son of Mahalakshmi	"Vacchuka Vacchukava"	Srikanth Deva	KK
2004	Kannadi Pookal	"Koothu Pattra"	S. A. Rajkumar	Manikka Vinayagam, S. A. Rajkumar
2005	Ji	"Thiruttu Rascal"	Vidyasagar	Mano
2005	Thotti Jaya	"Yaari Singari"	Harris Jayaraj	Ceylon Manohar, Karthik, Palakkad Sreeram
2005	Gurudeva	"Saiva Karuvadu"	Sabesh–Murali	Sabesh, Manikka Vinayagam
2006	Parijatham	"Oru Nodi Iru Nodi"	Dharan	Karthik, Shweta Mohan
2006	Kodambakkam	"Adi Nee Oru"	Sirpy	Murugan Iyer
2006	Devathaiyai Kanden	"Ore Oru Thopule"	Deva	Sabesh
2007	Vel	"Onnappola"	Yuvan Shankar Raja	Shankar Mahadevan
2007	Aanai	"Hey Idupattum"	D. Imman	
2007	Veeramum Eeramum	"Oru Kshanam"	Yugendran	Harish Raghavendra
2007	Ammuvagiya Naan	"Silir Silir"	Sabesh–Murali	
2007	Kovai Brothers	"Sootta Kilapi"	D. Imman	T. L. Maharajan
2007	Piragu	"Unnaipole Pennai"	Srikanth Deva	
2007	Thalainagaram	"Madi Madi"	D. Imman	Balram
2008	Nenjai Thodu	"LKG"	Srikanth Deva	Udit Narayan
2008	Naayagan	"Nila Nila Oodiva"	Mariya Manohar	
2008	Aayudham	"Sarakku Sarakku"	Alphonse Joseph	
2008	Newtonin Moondram Vidhi	"Paraparakura"	F. S. Faizal	Naresh Iyer
2012	Raattinam	"Asathum Azhagu"	Manu Ramesan	Ajay Sathyan, Manu Ramesan, Naveen
2012	Sattam Oru Iruttarai	"Poochandi Paarvaiyile"	Vijay Antony	
2014	Idhu Kathirvelan Kadhal	"Sara Sara Saravedi"	Harris Jayaraj	KK, MK Balaji
2023	Dhruva Natchathiram: Chapter One – Yuddha Kaandam	"Naracha Mudi"	Harris Jayaraj	

=== Telugu movie songs ===
Songs she has sung in Telugu movies:

Year	Film	Song	Composer	Co-singer(s)
2005	Bunny (2005 film)	"Bunny Bunny"	Devi Sri Prasad	Murali

== Filmography as Actress ==
Television

Year	Series	Role	Channel
2013	Dharma Yuddham	Indra	Vijay TV
2021-2023	Rajini	Ranjitham	Zee Tamil
2024	Kana Kaanum Kaalangal Season 3	Herself	Disney + Hotstar
2025-2026	Aadukalam	Kamatchi	Sun TV
2025-Present	Thendrale Mella Pesu	Gandhimathi	Star Vijay

Films

Year	Series	Role	Notes
2024	Brother	Teacher	

== Awards ==
- Best Female Playback singer for the song "Vecchikka Vecchikava" from M. Kumaran Son of Mahalakshmi
- Youth Icon (2004), by Damodharan College of Engineering & Management Studies, Coimbatore
- Young Achiever Award (2004), by Sangam Kala Group
- Best Young Playback Singer Award (2004), by TVK Cultural Academy

== Live shows ==
She has done more than 200 live shows in India and other countries, including Singapore, USA, Canada, Kuwait and Sri Lanka (Colombo). She performs live shows for companies, such as Hyundai, Aircel, Touchtel, Airtel, Samsung, BPL Mobile, TVS Group and Cognizant Technology Solutions, Ajuba Solutions. She also appears as a judge on Star Vijay's Super Singer TV series.

== Fan club ==
She has a fan club "No One Noticed Srilekha" in Portland, Oregon, US, the first for a Tamil singer in Oregon.
