= Mohammed Saleem =

Indian environmental activist (born 1972)

Mohammed Saleem (born 1972) is an Indian environmental activist, environmental campaigner, National Geographic educator and explorer. Member of the IUCN Commission on Education and Communication, He is the co-founder of Environment Conservation Group, a nonprofit NGO based out of Coimbatore, Tamilnadu that works on environmental conservation, advocacy and educational awareness. He has dedicated his life to the cause of environmental and wildlife conservation. Saleem has been involved in rescue operations, field expeditions, and campaigns to protect biodiversity and natural habitats. He is also a National Geographic certified educator and an ardent birder.

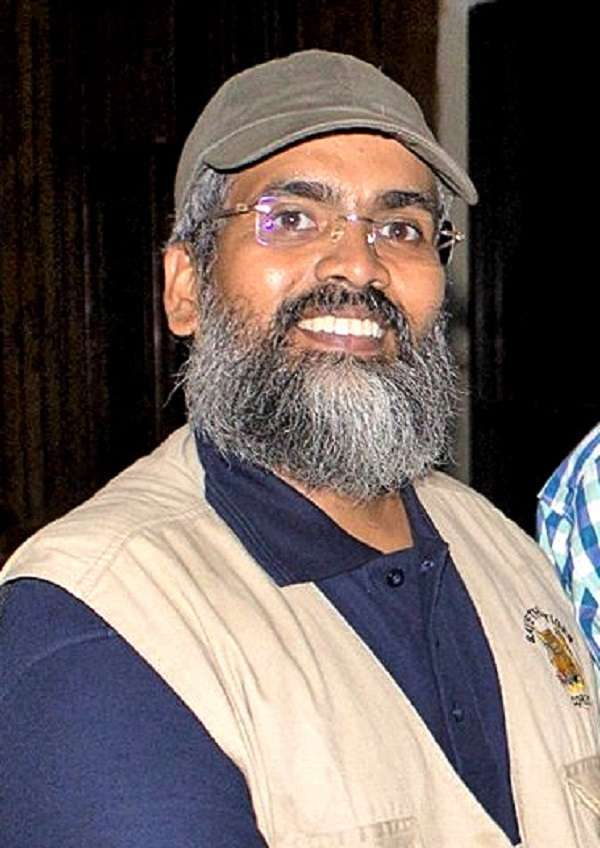

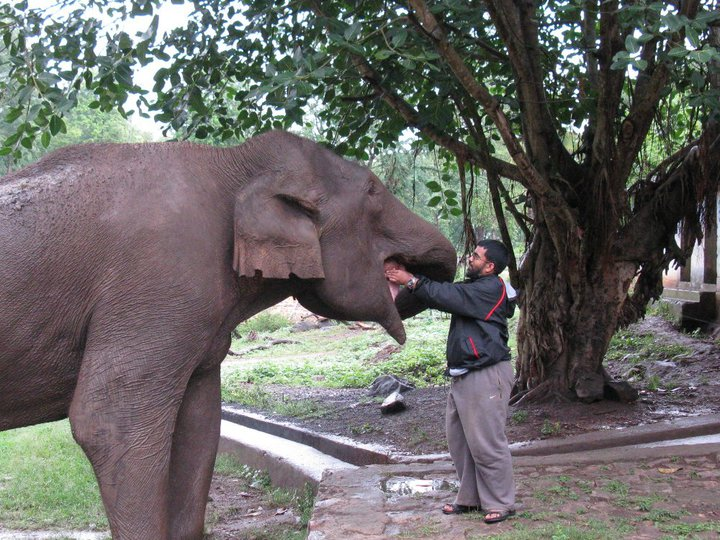
Saleem feeding an elephant

== Wildlife rescue ==
Saleem has undertaken multiple rescue operations leading to seizure of hundreds of wild animals from illegal hunters and pet vendors and is also instrumental in eliminating hundreds of snares meant to trap wild animals. He has been recognised by Wildlife Crime Control Bureau among its first batch of volunteers in India.

== Environment conservation ==
An environmental activist; Saleem has raised his voice to save trees, climate action, wild animals and wetlands. His advocacy has been featured in media outlets ranging from BBC News to NDTV, The Hindu, South China Morning Post, India Today, Sanctuary Asia, and The Times of India to name a few.

== Education and awareness ==
A National Geographic educator and coordinator of Kids for Tigers he has been active in spreading awareness to younger generations. He has been invited to various schools from Tribal school in Sundarbans to the prestigious Doon School. He was also invited to talk to students at Tribhuvan University - Kathmandu, Wild Team- Dhaka to name a few. Saleem has also conducted sessions for Forest officers across the country. He received the Guinness World Record certificate for his role in " The largest Recycling lesson" along with Coimbatore City Municipal Corporation in the year 2015.

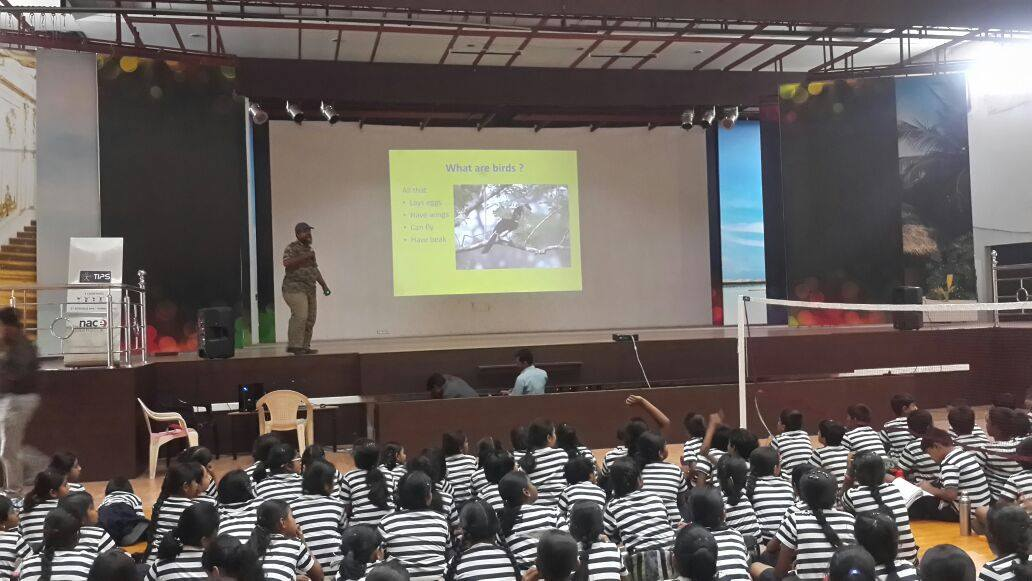

== SEEK expeditions ==
Saleem led four expeditions covering all 28 states of India and neighbouring countries Nepal, Bhutan and Bangladesh. The team visited various wildlife scantuaries and national parks documenting roadkills, endangered animals and India's rich natural heritage. During the expeditions the team also visited various educational institutions to spread awareness on the importance of saving wildlife and their natural habitats. The team was also successful in documenting some of India's most threatened animals.

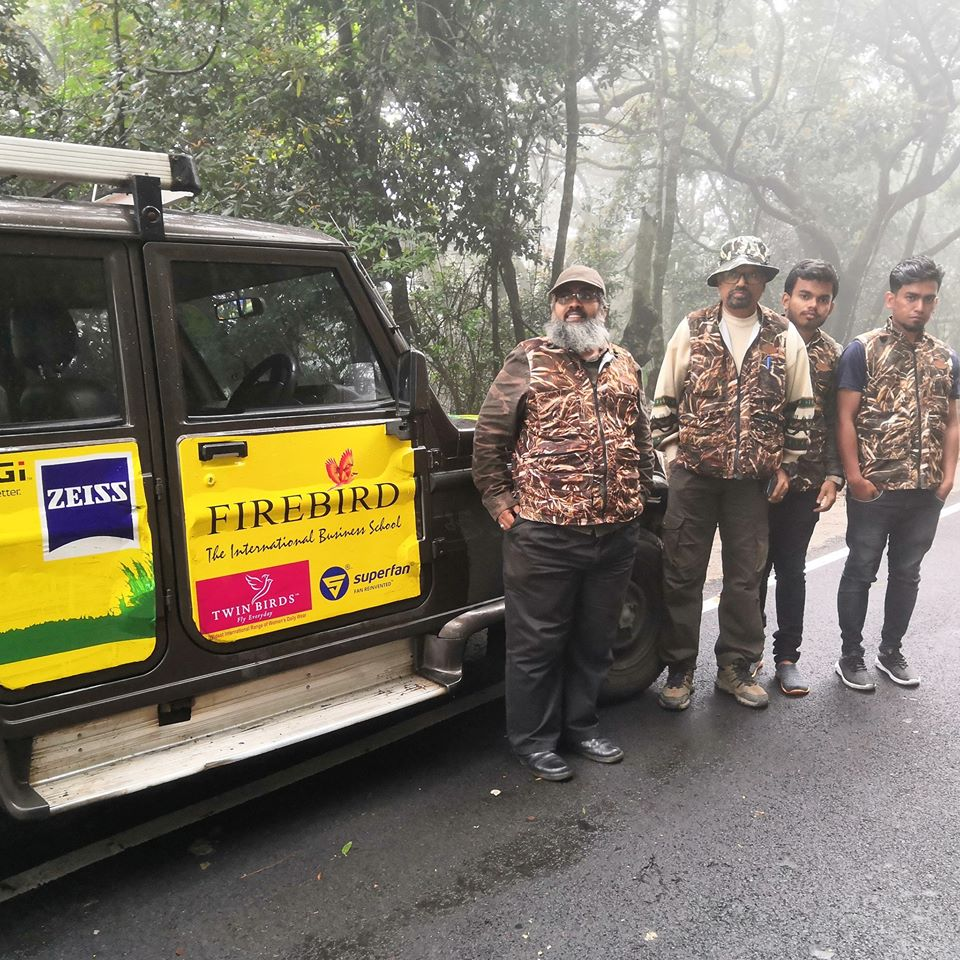

== Natural disaster relief programs ==
Saleem has been active along with his Environment Conservation Group team during time of climate disasters such as 2018 Kerala floods and Tamil Nadu floods of 2015 South India floods. He and his team spent days at Cuddalore providing relief to the people worst affected by the unprecedented floods. His service during the floods earned him the Real Hero Award from Coimbatore City Municipal Corporation in the year 2015.

== Save racecourse ==
Mohammed Saleem was instrumental in highlighting the issue of Coimbatore Racecourse, he led a mass movement which was successful in persuading the Coimbatore Corporation to give up the building of unwanted structures in a racecourse at the cost of the environment.

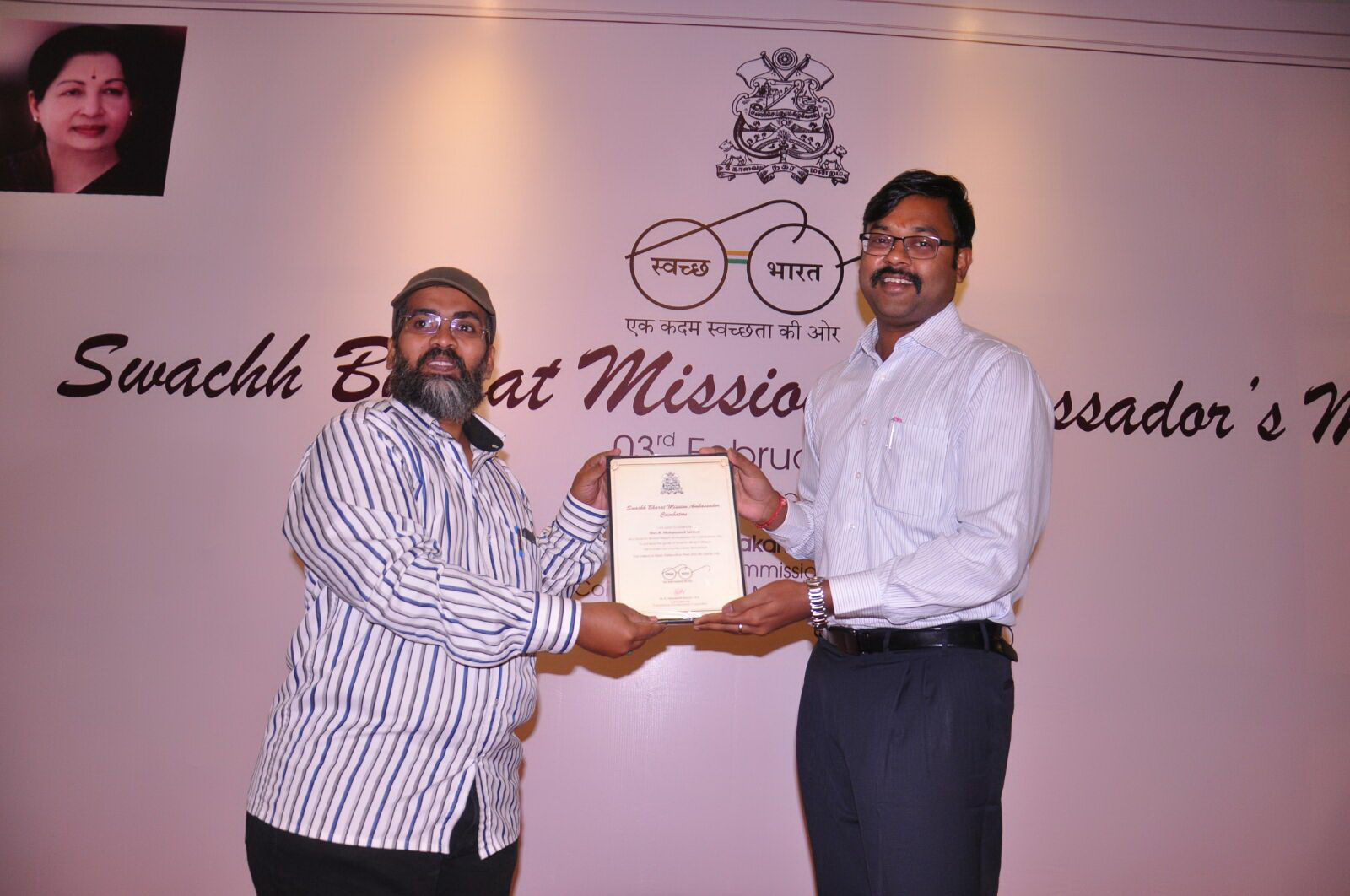

== Awards and recognition ==
- Member - IUCN Commission on Education and Communication 2021-2025
- Grantee - National Geographic Society - 2021
- Distinguished Alumni Award- RVS College of Arts & Science - 2018
- National Geographic Educator – 2018
- Mitafest Awards - Madras Institute of Technology - 2017
- Wildlife Crime Control Bureau Volunteer - 2016
- Brand ambassador for Swachh Bharat Mission - Coimbatore, since 2016
- "Nature's Bodyguard" Times of India, February 2015.
- Coimbatore City Municipal Corporation- Real Hero Award 2015
- British Council RAAC ABS ECO Awards - 2014
- "Jumbo man of the jungle" Deccan Chronicle, June 2014.
- "The Good Earth" The Hindu, August 2013
- "Top ten magnificent tiger defenders of India" Sanctuary Asia, August 2013.
