= Kalavaram =

2014 Indian film by S. D. Ramesh Selvan

- Release poster
- Directed by: S. D. Ramesh Selvan
- Produced by: T. R. Ravichandran
- Starring: Sathyaraj; Tanikella Bharani; Ajay Reddy; Yazar Arafath
- Cinematography: P. Chandran
- Edited by: A. Marish
- Music by: F. S. Faizal
- Production company: Universal Productions
- Release date: 14 January 2014
- Country: India
- Language: Tamil

Kalavaram (English: Riot) is a 2014 Tamil film directed by S. D. Ramesh Selvan and produced by Ravichandran. The film features veteran actors Sathyaraj and Tanikella Bharani in the leading roles, while an ensemble cast of newcomers play other pivotal roles. The film, which had been in production since 2010, released on 14 January 2014.

== Plot ==
Four college students find themselves entangled in the aftermath of devastating communal riots. As they attempt to seek justice for those affected, they end up being incarcerated. When a retired officer takes charge of an inquiry commission, the students band together with him to bring about justice and resolution to the community.

== Cast ==
- Sathyaraj as DCP Vetriselvan
- Tanikella Bharani as Adi Moolam
- Raj Kapoor
- Mayilsamy as Mayilsamy
- Ajay Reddy
- Ragavender
- Yazar Arafath
- Kutti Ajay
- Sujibala
- Inbanila
- Lavanya
- Hethil
- Munnar Ramesh as Police Inspector
- Nandha Saravanan
- Pudhupettai Suresh
- Cheranraj
- Gaana Bala in a special appearance

== Production ==
Ramesh Selvan, director of the films Ulavuthurai (1998) and Jananam (2004), announced that he would be making a comeback in early 2010, revealing that he was working a project titled Kalavaram with Sathyaraj in the lead role. He noted that he had taken an extended break as his previous film, Runway with Prashanth, had run into financial problems. Kalavaram was revealed to be based on a true story, that of the biggest riot that has ever taken place in Tamil Nadu, with Sathyaraj playing a deputy police commissioner who heads an investigation commission. The soundtrack of the film was released at an event in Chennai in September 2011, with composer Faizal noting that there were only two songs in the film.

The release of the film was pushed back several times, leaving the project which began in 2010, in development hell. Plans to release the film in August 2013 were also unsuccessful due to a high number of other films seeking theatres for release.

== Music ==
The music was composed by F. S. Faizal.

Track listing
| No. | Title | Lyrics | Singer(s) | Length |
|---|---|---|---|---|
| 1. | "Choyyan Choyyan" | Snehan | Naveen | 4:42 |
| 2. | "Engaeyum Eppothum" | Viveka | Naveen, P. Keerthan, Sam, Mano Tangi, Vijayanthi, Seelima Balaji, F. S. Faizal | 5:10 |
| Total length: | | | | 9:52 |

== Release ==
The film finally released on 14 January 2014 coinciding with the Tamil festival of Thai Pongal. It opened to mixed reviews, with a critic from The Hindu noting the film has a "messy plot" and that it "never becomes anything more than a generic action movie, with generally underwhelming performances and staging". A critic from the New Indian Express noted the film is "interesting in parts" and "a more coherent screenplay and consistency in treatment could have made it an engaging fare."
