= Piragu =

- Directed by: N. Jeeva
- Written by: N. Jeeva
- Produced by: R. Saravana; S. K. Chandhrasekar
- Starring: Hamsavardhan; Keerthi Chawla; Sunitha Varma
- Cinematography: A. Kasi Vishwa
- Edited by: A. P. Manivannan
- Music by: Srikanth Deva
- Production company: Dreamland Movies
- Release date: 21 September 2007
- Running time: 145 minutes
- Country: India
- Language: Tamil

Piragu (transl. After) is a 2007 Indian Tamil-language crime drama film directed by N. Jeeva. The film stars Hamsavardhan, Keerthi Chawla and Sunitha Varma, with Vadivelu, Kadhal Dhandapani, Malaysia Vasudevan, Sabitha Anand, Emey, and Karate Raja playing supporting roles. The film, produced by R. Saravana and S. K. Chandhrasekar, had music by Srikanth Deva, cinematography by A. Kasi Vishwa, and editing by A. P. Manivannan. The film released on 21 September 2007.

== Plot ==
Sathya (Hamsavardhan) is a drama director in his village who lives with his father Ramaiah (Malaysia Vasudevan), a respected Koothu artist, and his mother (Sabitha Anand). The village belle Thulasi (Keerthi Chawla), Sathya's relative, is in love with him since her childhood. Sathya comes to Chennai with hopes of becoming a cinema director one day. In Chennai, he lost his luggage and contact addresses. He is now left penniless and has nowhere to go. Sofia (Sunitha Varma), a small mechanic shop owner, gives him food to eat and accommodates him in her mechanic shop. In turn, Sathya helps her repair motorcycles besides looking for a film producer. Afterwards, Sofia falls in love with Sathya. At last, impressed by Sathya's story, a film producer accepts to producer his film. The same day, Sathya saves David (Karate Raja) from being killed by local rowdies. The gang leader Antony (Kadhal Dhandapani) commends Sathya for saving his brother from the rival gang rowdies and offers him to join his gang. Sathya declines Antony's proposal and speaks ill of his activity. Thereafter, Sathya's parents and Thulasi arrive in Chennai; they are accommodated by Sofia in her house. In the meantime, Antony and the rival gang leader Annapoorani (Emey) make peace and want to kill Sathya. What transpires next forms the rest of the story.

== Cast ==
- Hamsavardhan as Sathya
- Keerthi Chawla as Thulasi
- Sunitha Varma as Sofia
- Vadivelu as Samarasam
- Kadhal Dhandapani as Antony
- Malaysia Vasudevan as Ramaiah
- Sabitha Anand as Sathya's mother
- Emey as Annapoorani
- Karate Raja as David
- Chitra Lakshmanan as Film Producer
- Crane Manohar as Production Manager
- Sampath Ram as SP Sivakumar
- Gana Bala as Mechanic
- Lalitha Paatti as Sathya's grandmother
- Anjali Devi as Antony's wife
- Kong Kong as Samarasam's assistant
- Shankar as Samarasam's assistant
- Chelladurai as Police Officer
- Bonda Mani as Beeda Shop Owner
- Thambi Ramaiah
- Thideer Kannaiah
- Halwa Vasu
- Muthukaalai
- Kalidoss as Moneylender
- Ravi Shanth as Elango
- Siva Narayana Murthy as Bayilvan Veeramuthu
- Vijay Ganesh as Valakka
- Marthandam
- Subburaj
- Amirthalingam
- Rajmohan
- Vengal Rao
- Ragasya as an item number
- Robert in a special appearance

== Soundtrack ==
Piragu

Soundtrack album by Srikanth Deva
- Released: 2007
- Recorded: 2007
- Genre: Feature film soundtrack
- Length: 32:10
- Label: Five Star Audio
- Producer: Srikanth Deva

Srikanth Deva chronology
Nenjai Thodu (2007)	Piragu (2007)	Vijayadasami (2007)

The film score and the soundtrack were composed by Srikanth Deva. The soundtrack, released in 2007, features 6 tracks with lyrics written by Na. Muthukumar, Piraisoodan, Devakumar, Muthumagan and Gana Bala. Gana Bala, credited as Anathai Bala made his debut as singer and lyricist with this film in the song "Pathinoru Aattam" and also appeared in the song.

Track	Song	Singer(s)	Lyrics	Duration
1	"Mudalil Santhithen"	Harish Raghavendra, Meganthi	Na. Muthukumar	5:40
2	"Unnaipole Pennai"	Srikanth Deva, Srilekha Parthasarathy	Devakumar	5:32
3	"Amma Appa"	Vijay Yesudas	Na. Muthukumar	5:28
4	"Padinoru Per Aatam"	Gana Bala	Gana Bala	5:21
5	"Kitavaada Kitavaada"	Suchitra	Muthumagan	5:10
6	"Aasai Dosai"	Anuradha Sriram	Piraisoodan	4:59

== Reception ==
The film critic Malini Mannath wrote, "A lackluster script and slipshod narration reveal the amateurishness of a debutant director who seems not quite able to translate his ideas on to the screen", and that, "The saving grace of the film is Hamsavardhan (son of yesteryear hero Ravichandran), who bravely strides on through all the inadequacies of the script and his lacklustre role". Laya of Kalki called Vadivelu's comedy as relief and noted Srikanth Deva's music as average, called both story and screenplay as uncompelling.
