= Gana Bala =

Indian singer

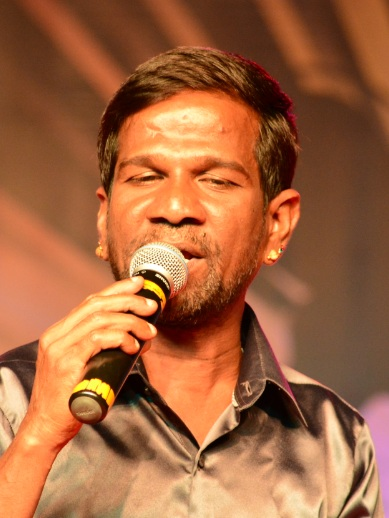
- Bala performing in Mitafest '14

Background information
- Also known as: Anathai Bala, 'Gana Kuyil King' Bala
- Born: M. Bala Murugan; 20 June 1969 (age 57); Swamimalai
- Occupations: Playback singer, lyricist, lawyer
- Years active: 2007–present

Bala Murugan, better known by his stage name Gana Bala is an Indian playback singer in Tamil cinema. He rose to prominence after rendering the songs 'Aadi Pona Aavani' and 'Nadukadalula Kappala' from the soundtrack of Attakathi. He has predominantly sung songs belonging to the gaana genre of Tamil Nadu. He has been credited for reviving the gaana genre in Tamil Cinema after 'Thenisai Thendral' Deva. He has also penned lyrics for some of his songs.

== Career ==
Bala first tripped on 'Gaana' when he was in high school. He gained confidence as a Gaana singer when he joined Presidency College, Chennai to study Botany. He later contested in the TV reality show Gana Kuyil Pattu that featured on Kalaignar TV and won it. He has worked on a number of devotional albums and also performed on stage. One of his independent albums, Vaanavil was released by composers Deva and Dhina. He made his debut in the film industry with Piragu composed by Srikanth Deva, son of the 'Father of Gaana Genre' – Deva. He first found success for his songs 'Aadi Pona Aavani' and 'Nadukadalula' in the sleeper hit Attakathi. Since then he has sung a number of successful songs under top composers like Yuvan Shankar Raja and G. V. Prakash Kumar.

He has also sung a jingle with composer G. V. Prakash Kumar to mark the 10th anniversary celebrations of Radio Mirchi Chennai.

== Other works ==
=== Film work ===
Apart from singing, Bala has also featured in some of his songs. He has also appeared in a minor role as a mechanic in his debut film Piragu. He has danced for a song in 'Attakathi' Dinesh's second movie as hero, Vaaraayo Vennilaave. At the audio launch of Vikraman's Ninaithathu Yaaro, Bala expressed interest in acting and his desire to become a hero. He will soon turn hero in a film to be directed by K. Selva Bharathy titled Parry's Corner. The film is said to ponder over the fact that while migrants to Chennai hit it big, Chennai-ties still live mediocre lives. Bala will be playing a cycle rickshaw driver.

=== Philanthropy ===
Bala is a law graduate and works as an advocate. He has contested local municipal elections twice as an independent candidate, losing only by slender margins. Bala, who identifies himself as an Ambedkarite, says,

"I am always involved in community activities. I like helping people. I would have been a politician if I had not become a singer".

== Filmography ==
=== As playback singer ===
Films

Year	Song(s)	Film	Composer	Co-singer(s)	Notes
2007	"Pathinoru Peru Aattam" "Unnaipola Pennai"	Piragu	Srikanth Deva	Solo; Srikanth Deva, Srilekha Parthasarathy	Credited as Anathai Bala
2008	"Phona Pottu"	Thodakkam	Jeyrom Pushparaj		Credited as Anathai Bala
2008	"Chikku Bukku Rayilu"	Vedha	Srikanth Deva		Credited as Anathai Bala
2012	"Aadi Pona Aavani" "Nadukadalula Kappala"	Attakathi	Santhosh Narayanan		Also composed 'Nadukadalula Kappala'
2012	"Nenaikuthey"	Pizza	Santhosh Narayanan		
2013	"Duet Song" "Pottiyunnu Vanthuputta"	Kanna Laddu Thinna Aasaiya	S. Thaman	Muralidhar, Rahul Nambiar, Ranjith; Solo	
2013	"Thannai Thaane"	Paradesi	G. V. Prakash Kumar		
2013	"Edhathaan Kanduttey Nee Pudhusa"	Settai	S. Thaman		
2013	"Mannadacha Pandhu" "Oru Grammam"	Gouravam	S. Thaman		
2013	"Ora Kannala"	Udhayam NH4	G. V. Prakash Kumar		
2013	"Kaasu Panam"	Soodhu Kavvum	Santhosh Narayanan	Anthony Daasan	
2013	"Poosani Kaai"	Pattathu Yaanai	S. Thaman		
2013	"Ayyo Ramare"	Pusthakamlo Konni Pageelu Missing	Gunwanth Sen		Telugu film
2013	"Sandhegam"	Arya Surya	Srikanth Deva		
2013	"Hey Baby"	Raja Rani	G. V. Prakash Kumar	G. V. Prakash Kumar, Aishwarya	
2013	"En Veetula"	Idharkuthane Aasaipattai Balakumara	Siddharth Vipin		
2013	"Pa Pa"	Pizza II: Villa	Santhosh Narayanan	Rap by Vineet Mani	
2013	"Vaazhka Oru"	Naveena Saraswathi Sabatham	Prem Kumar		
2013	"Odi Odi"	3D Thaedi Pidi Adi	Karthik Harsha		
2013	"Run For Your life"	Biriyani	Yuvan Shankar Raja	ft. PSYCHO.unit	
2013	"Sethu Po"	Vizha	James Vasanthan	Sunandhan, Theodore	
2014	"Nee Quarter Nan Water"	Be Right Back	Princeten Charles		
2014	"Aaru Adi Veedu" "All Your Beauty"	Goli Soda	S. N. Arunagiri		
2014	"Don't Worry Be Happy"	Nimirndhu Nil	G. V. Prakash Kumar	S. Selva	
2014	"Enda Mapla"	Cuckoo	Santhosh Narayanan	Sathish, Dhee	
2014	"Vaazhkai Thaan"	Marumunai	Sathya Dev		
2014	"Bachelor Enakke"	Oru Kanniyum Moonu Kalavaanikalum	Natarajan Sankaran	Rap by Premgi Amaren	
2014	"Lovely Ladies"	Naan Sigappu Manithan	G. V. Prakash Kumar	Vijay Prakash, Megha, Aryan Dinesh, G. V. Prakash Kumar	
2014	"Oru Ponnu"	Pongadi Neengalum Unga Kadhalum	Kannan	M. A. Ramakrishnan	
2014	"Adaikalam"	Yaamirukka Bayamey	SN Prasad	El Fe Choir	
2014	"Chinnadaaga Morachiputta"	Adhu Vera Idhu Vera	Taj Noor		
2014	"Kelunganne Kelunga"	Vadacurry	Vivek Siva; Mervin Solomon		
2014	"Kokkara Kozhi"	Saivam	G. V. Prakash Kumar	Chinnaponnu, Ashwitha, Harish, Aishwarya	
2014	"Elarai"	Aindhaam Thalaimurai Sidha Vaidhiya Sigamani	Simon	Yabama JO	
2014	"Nokia Ponnu Samsung Paiyan"	Kadhalai Thavira Verondrum Illai	Srikanth Deva	Simrutha	
2014	"Porappu Erappu"	Poriyaalan	M.S. Jones		
2014	"Kaakidha Kappal" "Irandhidava"	Madras	Santhosh Narayanan	Sean Roldan, Tholkappiyan, Santhosh Narayanan; Solo	
2014	"Athangarai Orathile"	Yaan	Harris Jayaraj	Emcee Vickey (rap)	
2014	"Johny Johny"	Vennila Veedu	Dhanraj Manickam	Dhanraj Manickam	
2014		Royapuram-13	Dheen Dayal		Short film
2014	"Ayya Padichavare"	Jaihind 2	Arjun Janya	Rajesh Krishnan	
2014	"En Karunchingamaai"	Appuchi Gramam	Vishal Chandrasekar	Vishnu Muralee	
2014	"Vaada Poda"	Murugaatrupadai	Ganesh Raghavendra		
2014	"Doggy Style"	Naaigal Jaakirathai	Dharan Kumar		
2014	"Kannaadithanda"	Aaaah			
2014	"Gumthalakka"	Gugan	Guru Kalyan	Sri Nisha	
2014	"20-20"	Cricket Scandal	Deepan		
2014	"Venaam Mappilla"	Velmurugan Borewells	Srikanth Deva	Naveen Madhav	
2014	"Enna Solla"	Saravana Poigai	D. Vijay		
2014	"Jinji Nakka"	Nee Yen Uyire	Vijay Manthra		
2014	"Santhayila Bajarula"	Saravanan Engira Surya	Dhanraj Manickam		
2014	"Ponnuga Buththi"	Win	U. K. Murali		
2014	"Kadhalikka"	Rettai Kathir	Deva Kumar		
2014	"Thamizh Nattin"	Thiraipada Nagaram	Nithin Karthik		
2014	"Ambaani Ponnu"	Vaaraayo Vennilaave	Karthik Raja		
2014	"Yenda"	Ula	Saajan Madhav	Naveen Madhav, Dwayne Bravo	
2014	"Nadukadulula"	Vaaliba Raja	Radhan	Radhan	
2014	"Atta Kathi Mokka Peesu"	Mozhivathu Yathenil	Nithyan Karthik		
2014	"Adhaaru Udhaaru"	Yennai Arindhaal...	Harris Jayaraj	Vijay Prakash	
2014	"Jallikattu Kaalai"	Manam Nilluna Nikkadhadi	R.G. Allen		
2014	"Kastathae Yaaru Kitta"	Maalumi	Baskar		
2014	"Friend Nambuda", "God God"	Rombha Nallavan Da Nee	Ram Surender		
2014		Love Pannunga Life Nallarukkum			
2014	"Aashe Paddadu"	Superstar Kidnap	Sai Karthik		Telugu film
2014	"Kaal Mulacha Beer"	Mei Marandhen	K. R. Kawin	K. R. Kawin	
2014	"Devadas"		Ravi Arziyaan (Ksmusic)	Saint and Ramnath (Malaysia)	
2014	"Vandha Malai"	Darling	G. V. Prakash Kumar	Karunas, Arunraja Kamaraj	
2014	'"Currency Raja"	Currency Raja	Chinni Charan		Tamil dubbed version of Vasool Raja
2015	"Vandha Kada"	Vai Raja Vai	Yuvan Shankar Raja		
2015	"Sonu papadi"	Soan Papdi	Dhanraj Manickam	Sivani	
2015	"Paatha Oru Lookula"	Inimey Ippadithaan	Santhosh Kumar Dayanidhi		
2015	"Dakalti"	Trisha Illana Nayanthara	G. V. Prakash Kumar		
2015	"Chinna Vayasula"	Charles Shafiq Karthiga	Sidhartha Mohan		
2016	"Ulagam Oruvanukka", "Veera Thurandhara"	Kabali	Santhosh Narayanan		
2016	"Rotora Padhayile"	Ammani	K		
2016	"Naan Kaaylankada"	Azhahendra Sollukku Amudha	Rajin Mahadev		
2016	"Wish You A Happy New Year"	Bayam Oru Payanam	Y. R. Prasad		
2018	"Kaattu Vaasi"	Kilambitangayya Kilambitangayya	Sreekanth		
2018	"Maadila Nikkura Maankutty"	Vada Chennai	Santhosh Narayanan	Dhee	
2018	"Kurukupettai"	Vaandu	A R Neshan		
2018	"Kudure Kudure"	Aadi Purana	Vikram Vasisht, Chandana Vasisht		Kannada film
2019	"Paathikapatta Nenjamellam"	Butler Balu	Ganesh Raghavendra		
2021	"What A Life"	Trip	Siddhu Kumar		
2021	"Aao Ji Aao"	Oh Manapenne	Vishal Chandrashekhar		
2022	"Kadamaiyai Sei"	Kadamaiyai Sei	Arunraj		
2022	"Suthura Boomi"	Varalaru Mukkiyam	Shaan Rahman		Lyrics by Santhosh Rajan
2024	"Dangerunga Danger"	Vaagai	Sree Sai Dev		
2026	"Happy Lucky Day Chellam"	Lucky the Superstar	Hesham Abdul Wahab		Lyrics by Arunraja Kamaraj
2026	"Jilpanso"	Youth	G.V. Prakash Kumar	Ken Karunas, Eshwar	Lyrics by Ken Karunas, Eshwar
2026	“Poda Padichiruken”	Meesaya Murukku 2	Hiphop Tamizha	V. M. Mahalingam,	
2026	"Aeroplane"	Scene	Sushin Shyam		Lyrics by Rajpriyan

- The films are listed in order that the film released, regardless of the dates the music released.

Television

Year	Song(s)	Serials	Composer	Co-singer(s)	Channels
2013	"Uruvaakum Karuvil"	Vamsam			Sun TV
2016	"Darling Da Da"	Darling Darling	Vishal Chandrasekhar		Zee Tamil

=== As lyricist ===
Year	Song(s)	Film	Composer
2012	"Nadukadalula Kappala"	Attakathi	Santhosh Narayanan
2013	"Love Letter" "Pottiyunnu Vanthuputta"	Kanna Laddu Thinna Aasaiya	S. Thaman
2013	"Edhathaan Kanduttey Nee Pudhusa"	Settai	S. Thaman
2013	"Ora Kannala"	Udhayam NH4	G. V. Prakash Kumar
2013	"Kaasu Panam"	Soodhu Kavvum	Santhosh Narayanan
2013	"Sandhegam"	Arya Surya	Srikanth Deva
2013	"Hey Baby"	Raja Rani	G. V. Prakash Kumar
2013	"Vaazhka Oru"	Naveena Saraswathi Sabatham	Prem Kumar
2014	"Sokkathaan Aadu"	Kalavaram	F. S. Faizal
2014	"Aaru Adi Veedu" "All Your Beauty"	Goli Soda	S. N. Arunagiri
2014	"Don't Worry Be Happy"	Nimirndhu Nil	G. V. Prakash Kumar
2014	"Enda Mapla"	Cuckoo	Santhosh Narayanan
2014	"Vaazhkai Thaan"	Marumunai	Sathya Dev
2014	"Open the Tasmac"	Maan Karate	Anirudh Ravichander
2014	"Bachelor Enakke"	Oru Kanniyum Moonu Kalavaanikalum	Natarajan Sankaran
2014	"Avalai Nambithan"	Salim	Vijay Antony
2014	"Porappu Erappu"	Poriyaalan	M.S. Jones
2014	"Scenu Scenu"	Sigaram Thodu	D. Imman
2014	"Kaakidha Kappal" "Irandhidava"	Madras	Santhosh Narayanan
2014	"Nadukadulula"	Vaaliba Raja	Radhan
2014	"20-20"	Cricket Scandal	Deepan
2014	"Jinji Nakka"	Nee Yen Uyire	Vijay Manthra
2014	"Santhayila Bajarula"	Saravanan Engira Surya	Dhanraj Manickam
2014	"Jallikattu Kaalai"	Manam Nilluna Nikkadhadi	R.G. Allen
2014		Velachery	Taj Noor
2014		Kadavan	Srikanth Deva
2014		Yevan	A.K. Sasidharan
2014		Aaaah	
2014		Love Pannunga Life Nallarukkum	
2015	"Vandha Kadha"	Vai Raja Vai	Yuvan Shankar Raja
2015	"Partha Oru Lookla"	Inimey Ippadithan	Santhosh Dhayanidhi

=== As actor ===
Year	Film	Role	Notes
2007	Piragu	Mechanic	
2021	Sarpatta Parambarai		Uncredited Role

=== As singer (music video) ===
- Note: this is a list of films that Gana Bala only appeared as a singer/dancer in the song's official music video.

Year	Film	Song	Notes
2008	Vedha	"Chikku Bukku"	
2013	Udhayam NH4	"Ora Kannala"	
2013	Soodhu Kavvum	"Kasu Panam"	
2013	Raja Rani	"Hey Baby"	
2014	Kalavaram	"Sokkathaan Aadu"	
2014	Nimirndhu Nil	"Don't Worry Be Happy"	
2014	Marumunai	"Vaazhkai Thaan"	
2014	Oru Kanniyum Moonu Kalavaanikalum	"Bachelor Enakke" (promo song)	
2014	Aindhaam Thalaimurai Sidha Vaidhiya Sigamani	"The Elarai"	
2014	Kaadhal 2014	"Oh Jinglee"	
2014	Kadhalai Thavira Verondrum Illai	"Nokia Ponnu Samsung Paiyan"	
2014	Madras	"Irandhidava"	
2014	Jaihind 2	"Ayya Padichavare"	
2014	Jaihind 2	"Ayya Chandruda"	Telugu song
2014	Abhimanyu	"Kathala Manayolage"	Kannada song
2014	Aaaah	"Kannaadithanda"	
2015	Rombha Nallavan Da Nee	"God God"	
2015	Vaaraayo Vennilaave	"Ambaani Ponnu"	
2015	Mozhivathu Yathenil	"Atta Kathi Mokka Peesu"	
2016	Nanaiyatha Mazhaiye	"Manasu Sari Illai"	
2016	Andaman	"Kaalai Maalai"	
2019	Butler Balu	"Paathikapatta Nenjamellam"	
2023	Yevan		
2024	Vaagai	"Dangerunga Danger"	

=== Television Appearance ===
Year	Programme / Show	Role	Channel	Language	Notes
2023	Bigg Boss Tamil 7	Contestant	Vijay TV	Tamil	Wildcard (Entered Day 28); Evicted Day 49

== Awards ==
Kalaimamani Honour by Tamil Nadu Government

- 2015 - Contribution to Playback singing

Year	Film	Award Ceremony	Category	Song(s)	Result
2013	Attakathi	Vikatan Awards 2012	Best Playback Singer (Male)	Nadukadalula Kappala; Aadi Pona Aavani	Won
2013	Attakathi	7th Annual Vijay Awards	Best Male Playback Singer; Best Lyricist	Nadukadalula Kappala	Nominated
2013	Attakathi	Chennai Times Film Awards 2012	Best Singer (Male)	Nadukadalula Kappala	Nominated
