= Kamara Kattu =

2015 Indian film by Ramki Ramakrishnan

- Directed by: Ramki Ramakrishnan
- Written by: Ramki Ramakrishnan
- Produced by: R. Mohan
- Starring: Yuvan; Sree Raam; Raksha Raj; Manishajith
- Edited by: S. Sathish
- Music by: F. S. Faizal
- Production companies: Reves Creations; Sree Daksha Innovations
- Release date: 22 May 2015
- Running time: 158 minutes
- Country: India
- Language: Tamil

Kamara Kattu is a 2015 Indian Tamil-language romantic horror film directed by Ramki Ramakrishnan and starring Yuvan, Sree Raam, Raksha Raj and Manishajith.

== Cast ==
- Yuvan as Ramesh
- Sree Raam as Ravi
- Raksha Raj as Malarkodi
- Manishajith as Poongodi
- Crane Manohar
- Pakoda Pandi
- Vasu Vikram
- Bala Singh
- Chetan
- Thalapathy Dinesh

== Production ==
The director also worked as an art director and lyricist for the film.

== Soundtrack ==
The songs were composed by F. S. Faizal. He sang two songs with his friend Gana Bala. Janani, who trained under Ramya NSK sang four songs.

- "Erumattu Payale" - Santhosh, Vandhana Srinivasan
- "En Kadhal Pichukichu" - Gana Bala, F. S. Faisal
- "Jollu Vittu" - Gana Bala, F. S. Faisal
- "Unnai Ennai" - Santhosh
- "Gethu Poiyyada" - Mano

== Reception ==
A critic from The Times of India gave the film a rating of one-and-a-half out of five stars and wrote that " This so-bad-it's-good quality is the film’s biggest strength or rather, it's [sic] only strength". A critic from The New Indian Express said that "The screenplay and its treatment lack appeal and the film is neither funny nor horrifying". On the contrary, Maalaimalar praised the performances of the cast, the music, and the cinematography.
