= Vajram =

Vajram may refer to:

- Vajra, a weapon in Indian religions
- Vajram (1995 film), a 1995 Indian Telugu-language film
- Vajram (2004 film), a 2004 Indian Malayalam-language drama film
- Vajram (2015 film), a 2015 Indian Tamil-language film

== See also ==
- Vajrayana, Indian Tantric Buddhism
- Vajrasana (disambiguation)
