= Sillunu Oru Sandhippu =

2013 Indian film by Ravi Lallin

- Poster
- Directed by: Ravi Lallin
- Written by: Ravi Lallin
- Produced by: S Nandhagopal
- Starring: Vimal; Oviya; Dipa Shah
- Cinematography: Rajesh Yadav
- Music by: F. S. Faizal
- Production company: Madras Enterprises
- Release date: 14 February 2013
- Country: India
- Language: Tamil

Sillunu Oru Sandhippu (transl. A Very Cool Meeting) is a 2013 Tamil language romance film written and directed by Ravi Lallin in his directorial debut venture. The film stars Vimal, Oviya and Dipa Shah in the lead roles. The film was earlier titled as Sillu Sillunu Oru Sandhippu, which was later changed to Sillunu Oru Sandhippu.

== Plot ==
Ashok and Geetha fall in love when in school, but are separated by their families. Years later, Ashok returns to the country from the US and begins a relationship with Charumathi, but chaos ensues when Geetha comes back into his life.

== Cast ==
- Vimal as Ashok
- Oviya as Geetha
- Dipa Shah as Charumathi
- Charuhasan
- Manobala
- Bhavani
- Ashvin Raja
- Brinda Parekh (Item number)
- Javno Isshiki (Item number)
- Jugnu Ishiqui (Item number)

== Production ==
Earlier titled as Unmai Sonnaal Nesipaya and then Anaithukkum Aasaipadu and then as Sillu Sillunu Oru Sandhippu, major portions of filming was done in Chennai, sirumalai and Malaysia till February 2012. The second schedule began after the end of FEFSI strike. The last schedule was happening in the month of April.

Director Ravi Lallin said "I have worked with T. Nagaraj and Vincent Selva and written the dialogues for Newtonin Moondram Vidhi under the name Chidambaram. Sillunu Oru Santhippu is based on a real-life incident, which took place in a family court in Chennai in 2000".

Dipa Shah and Oviya initially had a misunderstanding during the shooting.

== Soundtrack ==
The music of the film is composed by F. S. Faizal who earlier composed for S. J. Suryah starrer Newtonin Moondram Vidhi under the name Vinay. The single track launch event took place on 15 September at the Loyola College in Chennai among young Chennaiites. The track that goes 'Busse Busse...' is crooned by Vijay Prakash and reflects on Bus Day that's usually celebrated by college goers. Audio was launched on 15 October 2012. All the songs were written by Viveka.

- "Yaayum Yaayum" - Haricharan, Hemambika
- "Adi Aathi" - Aalap Raju, Anitha
- "Busse Busse" - Vijay Prakash, Rita
- "Bul Bultara" - Sam P. Keerthan, Ramya NSK
- "Minminiye" - Karthik, Manotaangy

== Critical reception ==
The Hindu wrote:"the film meanders [sic] sign enough that this is one meeting you should avoid". Behindwoods wrote:"The theme might be topical [sic] but the director dilutes the effect with too many messages and sermons throughout the film [sic] disjointed episodes that do not contribute to the flow of the film and its retro characterization". The Times of India wrote:"director Ravi Lallin starts off with an interesting premise [sic] but it is in the execution that he falters". Rediff wrote:"Sillunu Oru Sandhippu is a must watch for all teenagers who believe that their love is real and will stand the test of time".
