= Pop Carn =

- Theatrical release poster
- Directed by: Nassar
- Written by: S. Ramakrishnan (Dialogue)
- Screenplay by: Nassar
- Story by: Nassar
- Produced by: Kameela Nassar
- Starring: Mohanlal; Simran; Vivek; Jyothi Naval; Urvashi
- Cinematography: Dharan
- Edited by: S. Sathesh; J. N. Harsha
- Music by: Yuvan Shankar Raja
- Production company: Kana Film Makers
- Release date: 24 January 2003
- Running time: 127 minutes
- Country: India
- Language: Tamil

Pop Carn is a 2003 Indian Tamil-language romantic drama film written and directed by Nassar. The film stars Mohanlal and Simran, and introduces Simran's younger sister Jyothi Naval. The title is short for "Pop Carnival" and a play on the word "popcorn", with a storyline focusing on why marriages between celebrities can suffer due to conflicts between egos. In 2023, Nassar apologised for directing the film.

== Plot ==
Popular music director Vikramaditya returns from a long sabbatical to work with a young music troupe and falls in love with a fusion dancer Jamuna. The two marry but fall apart due to their clashing artistic egos. Vikramaditya's daughter Megha attempts to reunite her father and mother, but fails. The rest of the movie shows how Vikramadithya and Jamuna reuniting which forms the rest of the story.

== Cast ==
- Mohanlal as Vikramaditya
- Simran as Jamuna
- Jyothi Naval as Megha
- Kunal Shah as Satish
- Urvashi
- Vivek
- Sriman as a dancer in Jamuna's troupe
- Anju
- Pop Shalini
- K. Sivasankar
- Vagai Chandrasekhar
- Janagaraj
- Delhi Ganesh
- Thyagu
- Madhan Bob
- M. S. Viswanathan
- Laxmi Ratten
- Alphonsa (cameo appearance)

== Production ==
The film was initially set to be titled Theem Thari Kida. The film was launched by Sarika. In July 2002 the film was reported as being "in the finishing stages." Cinematography was initially supposed to be done by Sridhar and Vikram Dharma is the stunt master.

== Soundtrack ==
The soundtrack was composed by Yuvan Shankar Raja and features seven tracks, the lyrics of which were written by Vaali. Although the film's lead actor, Mohanlal, was said to sing one of the songs, titled "Amme Inge Vaa", it did not feature either in the soundtrack or in the film itself.

Song	Singer(s)	Duration
"Poovaitha Poovil"	Prasanna Rao, Mathangi	4:42
"Kathalaaki Kaninthathu"	S. P. Balasubrahmanyam, Srilekha Parthasarathy	4:25
"Antha Semai Thurai"	Hariharan, Manikka Vinayagam, Sujatha Mohan	5:25
"Poovellam Paaraddum"	Karthik, Tippu, Pop Shalini	1:38
"En Isaikku"	Hariharan, Sriram Parthasarathy	4:28
"Naan Vachen Lesa"	Srinivas, Vasundhara Das	5:19
"Theme Music"	Instrumental	3:04

== Reception ==
Director Nassar predicted that Pop-Carn would be "a big hit", and Sify wrote that Pop-corn "is modern family drama about relationships”, expanding that Nassar and Yuvan "created a new fusion music that’s elevated and uplifting." Malini Mannath wrote in Chennai Online, "While Nasser has been able to build up skillfully the relationship between the lead characters, the same cannot be said of his Pop Carnival scenes. Appalling are the flaws in the scripting and narration". Krishna Chidambaram of Kalki panned Nassar for not maintaining tension in proceedings and also the usage of English dialogues. He praised Mohanlal's acting but panned his accented dialogue delivery and also praised Simran's acting though he appreciated the symbolisms used by director but questioned was it enough for the film. GU of Deccan Herald wrote "Nasser, who moves the story mainly on the powerful performance by the lead pair, gets stuck in the climax and without much help form the music composer, takes it to a messy ending". Sify wrote "[..] Nasser fails to impress the audience with this `Pop Carn`. The screenplay is so bizarre that you wish Nasser had taken more care to make matters more simple, engaging and palatable!".
