= Sri Ramakrishna Darshanam =

2012 Indian film by G N Dass

- Directed by: G N Dass
- Produced by: G N Dass
- Starring: Sashikumar; Delhi Ganesh; Ravindranath; Suraj; Lakshmi; Uma
- Production company: G.N.D. Vision International Private Limited
- Release date: 10 August 2012
- Running time: 140 minutes
- Countries: Singapore; India
- Language: Tamil

Sri Ramakrishna Darshanam is a 2012 Tamil-language biographical film based on the life and philosophy of 19th century Bengali mystic saint Ramakrishna. The film was directed by G N Dass produced by G.N.D. Vision International Private Limited. The film had screened in Chennai before being shared 17 August as a part of the 150th anniversary of the birth of Swami Vivekananda.

== Synopsis ==
I wanted to give something back to the society, and this is my humble offering.

— G N Dass on the film

The film attempts to cover the entire eventful life of Ramakrishna. It starts with the birth of Ramakrishna (Gadadhar Chattopadhyay) at Kamarpukur, Hooghly and his childhood, but mainly focuses on his spiritual development. Young Gadadhar rejects conventional education system, stops going to school and spends most of the time in studying Indian mythological scriptures such as Ramayana, Mahabharata, Puranas. He also starts meditating.

In the youth, he comes to Calcutta (now the city is known as Kolkata) and gets appointed as the priest of Dakshineswar Kali Temple. Very soon he starts ignoring his responsibilities in the temple and starts concentrating mainly on spiritual practices. He goes to the nearby forest and meditates for days.

Finally Ramakrishna attains fulfilment in his sadhana and becomes popular as the mystic saint of Dakshineswar. Many people come to him to learn about spirituality and Bhakti Yoga. He meets Narendranath Datta too whom he prepares to dedicate himself for the welfare of humanity. Ramakrishna develops throat cancer, but he continues to preach and attend his devotees, neglecting his health till his death.

== Cast ==
- Vicnesh as Ramakrishna as a child
- Sashikumar as Ramakrishna
- Delhi Ganesh
- Ravindranath
- Suraj
- Lakshmi
- Uma

== Production ==
The film was directed and produced by G N Dass, a 74-year-old Singaporean, under his banner G.N.D. Vision International Private Limited. Dass stated the film "is not a commercial movie" and that "a film covering the entire life of Sri Ramakrishna, right from his childhood, was never made before" and that's why they decided to make this movie to spread the vision and teachings of Ramakrishna.

== Release ==
The film released in Tamil (original) and Hindi language (dubbed) on 17 August 2012 and was shown in Singapore and India. The film was released as a part of the 150th anniversary of the birth of Swami Vivekananda and marked the anniversary celebration in Singapore.

On 24 November 2012 the film was screened at University Cultural Center in Singapore where Deputy Prime Minister of Singapore Tharman Shanmugaratnam watched the film.

== Reception ==
Professional ratings
Review scores
Source	Rating
The Times of India	3/5 stars

The film was released as a part of the 150th anniversary of the birth of Swami Vivekananda and marked the anniversary celebration in Singapore. Upon release the film received mixed and mainly positive reviews. Indian newspaper The Times of India rated the movie 3 out of 5 stars and commented the film was interesting, though the director had nothing new to offer. They told the acting in the film was satisfactory and Sashikumar's acting was "okay". They concluded their review with "if what you are looking to get a brief account of the mystic's life, this one is eminently recommended.".
