= Pizhai =

2020 Tamil film

- Theatrical release poster
- Directed by: Rajavel Krishna
- Produced by: R Dhamodharan
- Starring: "Kaaka Muttai" Ramesh; Appa Nasath; Gokul
- Cinematography: Bakki
- Edited by: Ram Gopi
- Music by: F. S. Faizal
- Production company: Turning Point Productions
- Release date: 3 January 2020
- Running time: 115 minutes
- Country: India
- Language: Tamil

Pizhai (transl. Mistake) is a 2020 Indian Tamil-language children's drama film directed by Rajavel Krishna in his directorial debut. The film stars Ramesh, Appa Nasath, and newcomer Gokul in the lead roles, while Charle, Mime Gopi, George Maryan, and Kalloori Vinoth play supporting roles. The music was composed by F. S. Faizal with cinematography by Bakki and editing by Ram Gopi. The film released on 3 January 2020.

== Plot ==
The film is about three boys: Vedi, Kodi, and Mayilu. They do not want to study, and they run away from their homes. Their experiences in the outside world make them realize their mistakes. A man approaches them and asks them to work. They agree only to be mistreated. When trying to escape, they lose Mayilu. They go all over and experience similar mishaps. When police returns Vedi and Kodi, they ask for Mayilu's whereabouts. They then find out that he has met his end.

== Cast ==
- "Kaaka Muttai" Ramesh as Vedi
- "Appa" Nasath as Dhanakodi alias Kodi
- Gokul as Mayilsamy alias Mayilu
- Charle as Sockalingam, Mayilu's father
- Mime Gopi as Vellai, Vedi's father
- George Maryan as Kuppusamy alias Kuppu, Kodi's father
- Kalloori Vinoth as Saravana
- Ilaya
- Manishajith
- Abirami
- Dharashini

== Production ==
The film stars Ramesh, Nasath, and Gokul as in important roles. Charle, Mime Gopi, and George play supportive roles in the film as parents who can't afford education for their kids. The film was shot in Chennai, Krishnagiri, Dharmapuri, Chitoor, and Tiruthani.

== Soundtrack ==
The soundtrack was composed by F. S. Faizal.

- Motor Illai – Velmurugan
- Sudum Varai – Keshav
- Ippadiye – Keshav, Priyanka
- Nee Irundha – Keshav

== Reception ==
The Times of India gave the film one out of five stars and states that "The lack of fresh sequences and the number of unnecessary sub-plots, do not evoke any interest in the audience". Deccan Chronicle gave the film two-and-a-half out of five stars and wrote that "Pizhai has good intentions but the execution is found wanting".
