= Deepa Chari =

Indian actress and model

- Born: Mumbai, India
- Occupation: Actress
- Years active: 2008–present
- Spouse: Gajendra Yadav
- Website: www.deepachari.com

Deepa Chari is an Indian actress and swimsuit model working in Kollywood.

== Background ==
Chari was born in Mumbai, India. She took to modeling at an early age and became one of the most sought after bikini models in Mumbai.

== Career ==
Chari has myriad modeling assignments to her name, from endorsing brands to being the bikini-clad calendar girl. She has also performed various ramp shows with designers like Manish Malhotra, Vikram Phadnis, Hemanth Trivedi, and Krishna Mehta.

She has appeared in various chart-topping music albums and worked with acclaimed directors and renowned production houses. "Kanta laga" the remix directed by Vinay Sapru and Radhika Rao and "Saiyaan dil mein aana re" with Anubhav Sinha productions are few of her most popular works.

Chari is one of the most accomplished dancers in the current Indian entertainment scene and has also acted in a Hindi film: Kabootar by Anubhav Sinha. The film Kabootar premiered at the 10th Osians-Cinefan Festival of Asian and Arab Cinema and was much appreciated by the audience. She performed the leading role in the 2009 films KA-99-B-333 and Balam.

== Career achievements ==
- Winner, Gladrags Mega Model Contest 2004.
- Won 1st runner up, n ”Best Body".
- Winner, Best Model of the World Contest 2003–2004.
- Won "Best smile of the World" Held in Turkey.
- Winner, Miss tourism of the world 2004–2005.
- Won "Best smile of the year" 04–05. Held in Malaysia

== Filmography ==
Year	Title	Role	Language	Notes
2008	Hogi Baa Magale		Kannada	
2009	KA-99 B-333	Varsha	Kannada	
2009	Balam	Divya	Tamil	
