= Sashikumar Subramani =

Indian Actor

- Born: Tamil Nadu, India
- Other name: Sashikumar
- Occupation: Actor

Sashikumar Subramani, better known as Sashi, is an Indian actor who has worked in Tamil language films, stage and serials. He made a breakthrough as an actor with his performances in Mani Ratnam's Kannathil Muthamittal (2002) and Balu Mahendra's Thalaimuraigal (2013), playing one of the lead roles in the later.

== Career ==
Sashikumar first appeared as Rambha's brother in N. Linguswamy's Aanandham (2001), before playing the character of a mentally-retarded youngster in Shahjahan (2001). Balu Mahendra then recommended Sashikumar to director Mani Ratnam during a chance meeting at Vijay Adhiraj's wedding, and the film-maker chose him to portray a LTTE separatist in the war drama, Kannathil Muthamittal (2002). He continued to portray small roles in films including in Balu Mahendra's Julie Ganapathi (2003), Nala Damayanthi (2003),Jay Jay (2003),Thirupachi (2005),Thalainagaram (2006) and S. J. Surya-starrer Newtonin Moondram Vidhi (2009).

Sashikumar returned to star in Sri Ramakrishna Darshanam (2012) starring as Indian yogi Ramakrishna for the venture. In 2013, he was cast in one of the lead roles in Balu Mahendra's final film, Thalaimuraigal, portraying an estranged son of the character portrayed by the director. Produced by director Sasikumar, the film opened to positive reviews in December 2013 but did not garner publicity to perform well at the box office. The Hindu called the film "good cinema" and added Sashikumar's "appreciable underplay is his asset" and "sadly, cinema has not used him enough".

== Filmography ==
| Year | Film | Role | Notes |
|---|---|---|---|
| 2001 | Aanandham | Renuka's brother | |
| 2001 | Shahjahan | Giri | |
| 2002 | Kannathil Muthamittal | Suicide bomber | |
| 2002 | Shree | | |
| 2003 | Julie Ganapathi | Ivan | |
| 2003 | Nala Damayanthi | Kicha | |
| 2003 | Jay Jay | Guna | |
| 2005 | Thirupaachi | Ravi's brother | |
| 2005 | Oru Kalluriyin Kathai | Chandru | |
| 2006 | Thambi | | |
| 2006 | Thalai Nagaram | Sasi | |
| 2007 | Lee | Sashi | |
| 2007 | Sringaram | | |
| 2008 | Thozha | | |
| 2008 | Dhanam | | |
| 2008 | Arai En 305-il Kadavul | | |
| 2009 | Padikkadavan | Kasi's brother | |
| 2009 | Newtonin Moondram Vidhi | Raghu | |
| 2012 | Sri Ramakrishna Darshanam | Sri Ramakrishna | |
| 2013 | Mouna Mazhai | Sashi | |
| 2013 | Thalaimuraigal | Sivaraman | |
| 2014 | Megha | Mani | |
| 2017 | Yazh | Sasi | |
| 2020 | Kakkai Siraginiley | | |
| 2026 | Kara | Bank Accountant | |

Television

- Kadhai Neram
- Chithi
