= Kaiyodu Kai =

- Directed by: Rajan Sarma
- Written by: Rajan Sarma
- Produced by: Vamana Pictures
- Starring: Aravind Akash; Yugendran; Sona
- Cinematography: B. R. Rajan
- Edited by: Suresh Urs
- Music by: Banapathra
- Production company: Vamana Pictures
- Release date: 27 September 2003
- Running time: 145 minutes
- Country: India
- Language: Tamil

Kaiyodu Kai (transl. Hand in hand) is a 2003 Indian Tamil-language romantic drama film directed by Rajan Sarma. The film stars Aravind Akash, Yugendran and newcomer Sona, with Raghuvaran, Malaysia Vasudevan, Thalaivasal Vijay, Karunas, M. N. Rajam, Pasi Sathya, Shanthi Williams and Srilatha playing supporting roles. It was released on 27 September 2003.

== Plot ==
In Chennai, Raja (Aravind Akash) and Manik (Yugendran) are best friends since their childhood. The orphan Manik owns a garage while Raja is a college student. Manik's garage stands just in front of a ladies hostel where Nithya (Sona) lives and Manik is in love with her. Raja and Nithya are collegemates and lovers. The morning, Nithya acts as a soft-spoken woman to the hostel warden and she leaves the hostels in a traditional dress which makes Manik falling in love with her. But then, she goes to her friend's house, changes her dress and goes to the college in modern dress. Nithya is also an outspoken and straightforward woman who hates male chauvinism.

Manik decides to impress Nithya's father Shanmugam (Malaysia Vasudevan) who lives in a village and Manik helps him sorting out a case. Shanmugam then promises him to give his daughter in marriage and Nithya finally sees Manik at the engagement in her village. The day of the wedding, she elopes and arrives at Raja's home. A distraught Manik starts drinking alcohol. In the meantime, Raja and Nithya get married in a temple in Chennai.

Later, Raja introduces to Manik his newly-wed wife Nithya and the two are shocked. Manik then promises Nithya that he will not tell anything to Raja. Nithya doesn't want to be a typical housewife doing housework so she starts to behave harshly towards Raja's family. Raja tries his best to bear her arrogant behaviour and the situation worsens dramatically day by day. Manik then plays a double game: on the one hand, Manik advises his friend Raja to behave violently towards his wife and on the other hand, Manik blindly supports Nithya in her decisions.

Three years later, Nithya and Raja live separately from each other and they are now busy with their professional career. To prove that the women are equal to men, Nithya asks Manik to marry her at the registrar office and invites Raja. The day of the marriage, Manik refuses to marry her and humiliates her. Manik tells Nithya that he doesn't do it to take revenge on her but to make her understand that Raja is a good husband who is still in love with her. Nithya realises her mistakes, Raja forgives her and the couple hugs each other. The film ends with Raja and Manik happily shaking hands.

== Cast ==
- Aravind Akash as Raja
- Yugendran as Manik (Manikkam)
- Sona as Nithya
- Raghuvaran as Manickavasagam, Raja's father
- Malaysia Vasudevan as Shanmugam
- Thalaivasal Vijay as Vijayakumar
- Karunas
- M. N. Rajam as Hostel warden
- Pasi Sathya as Mallika
- Shanthi Williams as Raja's mother
- Srilatha as Rekha Vijayakumar
- R. Vijaya as Nithya's mother
- Divya
- Shivani
- Adade Manohar
- Karuppatti Kannan
- Naresh Babu
- Vendakkai Sekhar
- Abhinayashree in a special appearance

== Soundtrack ==
Kaiyodu Kai

Soundtrack album by Banapathra
- Released: 2003
- Recorded: 2003
- Genre: Feature film soundtrack
- Length: 29:12
- Label: Five Star Audio
- Producer: Banapathra

The film score and the soundtrack were composed by Banapathra. The soundtrack features 6 tracks.

Tracklist
No.	Title	Lyrics	Singer(s)	Length
1.	"Ichukalaama"	Ponniyin Selvan	Krishnaraj, Swarnalatha	5:11
2.	"Innoru Bhoomi"	Snehan	Karthik, Ranjith	4:54
3.	"Iru Manam"	Rajan Sarma	Hariharan	5:16
4.	"Pennondru"	Piraisoodan	Karthik, Srinivas	3:45
5.	"Saianora"	Thamarai	Anuradha Sriram	5:22
6.	"Sugam Idhu"	P. Vijay	S. P. Balasubrahmanyam, Sujatha Mohan	4:44
Total length:				29:12

== Reception ==
Malini Mannath of Chennai Online opined that "The script defies logic many a time, and Manic's explanation for his actions are not convincing either. Arvind and Yugendar as Raja and Manic, try to fit into their roles, but are bogged down by an inadequate script".
