= Kaadhal 2014 =

2014 Tamil film by Suganthan

- Official poster
- Directed by: Sugunathan
- Written by: Sugunathan
- Produced by: B. Sudhakar
- Starring: Arish Kumar; Neha; Manikandan; Appukutty
- Cinematography: M. Rathesh Kanna
- Edited by: Sankar K.
- Music by: F. S. Faizal
- Production company: Saravana Film Maker
- Release date: 29 August 2014
- Running time: 121 minutes
- Country: India
- Language: Tamil

Kaadhal 2014 (transl. Love 2014) is a 2014 Indian Tamil-language romantic drama film written and directed by Suganthan and produced by B. Sudhakar. The film stars Arish Kumar, Neha, Appukutty, and Manikandan (in his debut as a villain). The film is about female empowerment. The music was composed by F. S. Faizal with cinematography by M. Rathesh Kanna and editing by Sankar K. The film released on 29 August 2014.

== Cast ==
- Arish Kumar as Baskaran
- Neha as Ranjani
- Manikandan as Kumar
- Appukutty
- Rajapandi as Kittu, Kumar's Friend
- Pasanga Sivakumar
- Velmurugan
- Kambam Meena
- Sharmila
- Shivani
- Paruthiveeran Ammulu
- Eeswaran
- Alagappan
- Salem Chinna Karuppu
- Venkat
- Balaji
- A. P. Sabari
- Elvis
- Vinoth
- Jayakumar
- Subramani
- Gana Bala in a special appearance in "Oh Jinglee"

== Soundtrack ==
The music was composed by F. S. Faizal.

- "Maanpola"
- "Mailakilli"
- "Oh Jinglee"
- "Pathikucha"

== Reception ==
Malini Mannath of The New Indian Express opined that "Dealing with a crucial issue, what was needed was a more focused screenplay and mature handling". A critic from Maalaimalar praised the film's novelty and music. A critic from iFlicks praised the film's theme and music while criticised the film's pace. A critic from Dinamalar called the film old-fashioned.
