= Environment Conservation Group =

- ecgwild
- Abbreviation: ECG
- Formation: 2009; 17 years ago
- Founder: Mohammed Saleem; Stephen Joseph
- Founded at: Coimbatore, Tamil Nadu, India
- Type: NGO
- Purpose: Environmental conservation, wildlife protection, habitat restoration
- Headquarters: 103 NH Road, Opp Naaz Theatre, Coimbatore – 641001, Tamil Nadu, India
- Region served: Coimbatore and surrounding areas
- Key people: Mohammed Saleem (Founder & Activist); Stephen Joseph (Co-founder & Vice-President)
- Website: www.ecgwild.org

The Environment Conservation Group (ECG), also known as ECGWILD, is a non-governmental organization based in Coimbatore, Tamil Nadu, India. Founded in 2009, it works on wildlife protection, habitat restoration, wetland conservation, and environmental awareness.

== History ==
ECG was established in 2009 by a group of conservationists led by environmental activist Mohammed Saleem and co-founder Stephen Joseph. The organization was formed in response to growing concerns over environmental degradation, wetland encroachment, and wildlife threats in the Coimbatore region.

== Activities ==
The group organizes tree-planting drives, monitors wetlands against illegal dumping and encroachments, educates students and communities on conservation, and tracks wildlife-related crimes.

Environment Conservation Group (ECG) is a non-governmental organization based in Coimbatore, India. Founded in 2009, ECG works on wildlife protection, habitat conservation, and environmental awareness. It is headed by Mohammed Saleem. Stephen Joseph is the co-founder and vice president.

The group is involved in monitoring the wetlands of Coimbatore to prevent debris dumping and encroachments. ECG is also involved in wildlife conservation, rescuing birds from the wildlife trade, stopping the felling of trees and conducting awareness programs.

== See also ==
- Environmentalism in India
