= Vajrasana =

Vajrasana (Sanskrit for "diamond seat" or "diamond throne") may refer to:

- The Vajrasana, Bodh Gaya, India where Gautama Buddha achieved enlightenment
- Vajrasana (yoga), an asana in yoga

== See also ==
- Vajram (disambiguation)
