= S. D. Ramesh Selvan =

Indian film director

- Born: India
- Occupation: Film director
- Years active: 1998–present

S. D. Ramesh Selvan is an Indian film director, who has made Tamil films.

== Career ==
Ramesh Selvan made his debut as a film maker with the action film Ulavuthurai (1998) starring Vijayakanth in lead role before making the revenge drama Jananam (2003) starring Arun Vijay. He then began directing a project titled Runway with Prashanth, but after a few schedules it had run into financial problems.

Ramesh announced that he would be making a comeback in early 2010, revealing that he was working a project titled Kalavaram with Sathyaraj in the lead role. Kalavaram was revealed to be based on a true story, that of the biggest riot that has ever taken place in Tamil Nadu, with Sathyaraj playing a deputy police commissioner who heads an investigation commission. The release of the film was pushed back several times, leaving the project which began in 2010, in development hell. Plans to release the film in August 2013 were also unsuccessful due to a high number of other films seeking theatres for release. Ramesh revealed that the producer of Thalaivaa, Chandraprakash, asked him to delay the release of Kalavaram to get more theatre space for his film. In return, Chandraprakash reportedly told Ramesh that he would purchase and distribute his film under his Sri Mishri Productions banner. Ramesh then alleged that the producer backed out of his commitments. The film eventually released in January 2014 to below average reviews. In mid 2012, Ramesh was signed up to direct a film titled Thalaivan featuring newcomer Bas and filmed it after finishing work on Kalavaram. In June 2013, he issued a press release distancing himself from the project, indicating that he had suffered health problems as a result of his strenuous work on the project and that he had to complete his other venture, Kalavaram (2014).

== Filmography ==
Year	Film	Notes			
Year	Film	Notes	1998	Ulavuthurai	credited as D. S. Ramesh Selvan
2004	Jananam	credited as D. Ramesh			
2014	Kalavaram				
2014	Thalaivan				
2015	Vajram				
2020	Nungambakkam				
