= KA-99 B-333 =

Indian drama film

- VCD cover
- Directed by: Arun Kumar
- Produced by: Puttanna
- Starring: Sunil: Deepa Chari
- Music by: Sangeet Raj
- Release date: 13 February 2009
- Running time: 135 minutes
- Country: India
- Language: Kannada

KA-99 B-333 is a 2009 Indian Kannada-language drama film directed by Arun Kumar. The film stars Sunil and Deepa Chari. The film was released theatrically on 13 February 2009 to highly negative reviews.

== Cast ==
- Sunil as Dini
- Deepa Chari as Varsha
- Sanketh Kashi
- Bank Janardhan as auto financier
- Karibasavaiah
- Ajay Rathnam

== Production ==
The filmmakers approached Trivikrama Mahadeva, who had performed last rites for 42,000 unclaimed bodies, promising monetary compensation for using his life story in the film KA-99 B-333. Karibasavaiah played Mahadev's character. Mahadev claimed he was promised payment but never received it. However, producer Puttanna countered that Mahadev had given permission to portray his character without compensation and had even lent his vehicle for filming.

== Soundtrack ==
KA-99 B-333

Soundtrack album by Sangeet Raj
- Released: 2009
- Genre: Feature film soundtrack
- Length: 21:06
- Language: Kannada
- Label: Lahari Music
External audio
- KA-99 B-333 – Jukebox on YouTube

The soundtrack was composed by Sangeet Raj. Sriharsha claims to have written the lyrics of the song "Naguthiddare Bedagi", but credits were attributed to director Arun Kumar. Sriharsha noted that he received payment for his work but not recognition. Indrajit Lankesh attended the audio launch as the chief guest.

Track listing
No.	Title	Lyrics	Singer(s)	Length
1.	"Kamanna Kattige"	Arun Kumar	S. P. Balasubrahmanyam	4:13
2.	"Kuhoo Kuhoo"	Sriharsha	Rajesh Krishnan, Nanditha	4:27
3.	"Naguthiddare Bedagi"	Arun Kumar	Chetan	4:46
4.	"Aluthiddare"	Sriharsha	Chetan	3:14
5.	"Hareyada Hudugi"	Sriharsha	Chaitra	4:24
Total length:				21:06

== Reception ==
The film received a government subsidy of ten lakh rupees, along with other films, as part of the Karnataka government's initiative to support the film industry.

A critic from The Times of India rated the film one-and-a-half out of five stars and criticized the sequences for being unconvincing. A critic from Bangalore Mirror wrote that "Everyone associated with the film has devotedly worked towards making it a bad one and has succeeded beyond reasonable doubt." A critic from Mid-Day wrote that "We won't blame you if you skip the rest [of the film], hop into the nearest auto (rigged meter or not) and wing your way home".
