= Mitafest =

Mitafest is the inter-college cultural festival of Madras Institute of Technology. The festival is held during the month of January or February every year. It is claimed to be the oldest inter-college festival in Chennai.

Mitafest is the oldest and biggest annual cultural festival of Chennai in existence today. It is the flagship event of MIT and an event of grandeur and extravaganza, drawing footfalls of more than 20,000 students from 100+ colleges for participating in 50+ events across the span of 3 days. It has thrived for more than 40 years and has blended along as the pride of the institute. Famous personalities who have endorsed and made their presence felt at Mitafest in the past are Indian film actor Kamal Haasan, playwright Sujatha, music exponents such as the actor Karthik, Benny Dayal, Naresh Iyer, the singer Karthik, Krish, Anuradha Sriram, Gana Bala, Saindhavi, Shakthisree Gopalan, Anitha Karthikeyan, Pragathi Guruprasad etc.

Mitafest is organised by the student body of the Madras Institute of Technology, The Athenaeum. More than 300 students take part in organizing this festival from scratch every year. Like many other festivals such as Mood Indigo and Saarang, Mitafest is a sponsor driven event with some financial support provided by the university's management. Performing venues range from the Hangar showcased in the Tamil movie Five Star, Rajam Hall and the open-air theatre right next to the library on campus. Off-stage events typically take place in the classrooms in the various departments, or in the Lecture Hall complex and Golden Jubilee Hall complexes.
