= Balam (2009 film) =

- Directed by: Murali Krishna
- Written by: Murali Krishna
- Starring: Arvind Vinod; Deepa Chari
- Cinematography: Shree Shankar
- Edited by: Satish Kurasowa
- Music by: Yugendran
- Production company: C J Reddy Enterprises
- Release date: 25 December 2009
- Country: India
- Language: Tamil

Balam (transl. Strength) is a 2009 Indian Tamil-language romantic drama film written and directed by Murali Krishna. The film stars Arvind Vinod and Deepa Chari, while Suhasini and Rahman appear in further supporting roles. Featuring music composed by Yugendran, the film was released on 25 December 2009.

== Cast ==
- Arvind Vinod as Mahesh
- Deepa Chari as Divya
- Krishna as Balaji
- Suhasini as Mahesh's sister-in-law
- Rahman as Abhishek
- Ganja Karuppu as Altap Arumugam
- Santhanam as Mahesh's friend
- Cool Suresh
- Jayasakthi
- Nellai Siva
- Scissor Manohar
- Ram Rajendran as Mahesh's friend
- Murali Krishna (cameo appearance in the song "Dhigilu Bagulu")

== Production ==
Director Murali Krishna launched Arvind Vinod, previously a VJ on Sun Music, as the lead actor in the film. Likewise, Deepa Chari, then a model from Mumbai, was cast as the lead actress for her first Tamil venture. A song sequence was shot at Ramoji Film City, Hyderabad, in which the director made a cameo.

== Soundtrack ==
The soundtrack was composed by Yugendran.

- "Thulukkanam" – Rahul Nambiar
- "Dhigilu Bagulu" – Vishakan, Naveen Madhav
- "Devathaiye" – S. P. Balasubrahmanyam
- "Jingunamani" – Yugendran, Manikka Vinayagam, Prashanthini
- "Kanavula Paathen" – Balram, Harini
- "Devathaiye" – Yugendran, Harini

== Reception ==
Pavithra Srinivasan from Rediff.com stated it was "movies like C J Reddy Enterprises' Balam, directed by Muralikrishna, make you realise how a film with an experienced cast can go haywire, thanks to a few silly elements that simply take away the joy of story-telling". She added, "what's even more puzzling is what veteran actors like Rahman and Suhasini are doing in a film where there's no scope to flex even a little finger, let alone acting muscles".
