= Vajram (2015 film) =

2015 Indian film by S. D. Ramesh Selvan

- Promotional poster
- Directed by: S. D. Ramesh Selvan
- Written by: Logithas (dialogues)
- Produced by: P. Ramu
- Starring: Kishore DS; Sree Raam; Pandi; Kuttymani
- Cinematography: A. R. Kumaresan
- Edited by: Marish
- Music by: F. S. Faizal
- Production company: Sri Sairam film factory
- Release date: 27 February 2015
- Country: India
- Language: Tamil

Vajram is a 2015 Indian Tamil-language comedy-drama film directed by S. D. Ramesh Selvan. It stars Kishore DS, Sree Raam, Pandi, and Kuttymani, in the lead roles, while Pavani Reddy, Jayaprakash, Thambi Ramaiah, and Mayilsamy play supporting roles. The film revolves around four boys who want to get revenge on a corrupt minister. The music composed by F. S. Faizal with editing done by Marish and cinematography by A. R. Kumaresan. The film was released on 27 February 2015 with negative reviews.

== Plot ==
The movie opens up intriguingly at a juvenile prison, where four teenage boys – Aravind, Madurai, Pandi, and Kuttymani – land up there on charges of raping their classmate. A brief gloomy segment reveals that they torture the inmates of juvenile homes at the hands of the wardens. Meanwhile, a police officer is the benami of a greedy minister named Selvanayagam, who has entrusted him with a 100 crore property, and the former wants to usurp it. The officer hatches a plan, picks up the four boys for his own benefit, and asks them to kidnap Selvanayagam. Little did he realize that the convicted boys already have a score to settle with Selvanayagam, who was responsible for them landing up in prison. With their own agendas set, they kidnap Selvanayagam's daughter Yazhini and take her hostage in a forest. Did the boys manage to take revenge on Selvanayagam and how they accomplish it forms the rest of the story.

== Cast ==
- Kishore DS as Aravindan
- Sree Raam as Madurai
- Pandi as Pandi
- Kuttymani as Kuttymani
- Pavani Reddy as Yazhini
- Sameera
- Sana
- Jayaprakash as Minister Selvanayagam
- Thambi Ramaiah as Ramaiah
- Mayilsamy as Annamalai
- Pondy Ravi as Police Officer
- O. A. K. Sundar as Collector
- Munnar Ramesh
- J. P. Jai
- Nandha Saravanan
- Bell Bhaskar
- Myna Naagu
- Amsa Devi

== Production ==
The gang of four from Pasanga and Goli Soda teamed up again in Vajram. Newcomer Pavani Reddy is the female lead, Jayaprakash plays a negative role, and Thambi Ramaiah plays a supporting character. The filming was held at Assam forests.

== Release ==
The satellite rights were sold to Raj TV. The film was initially given an A certificate by the Indian Censor Board for violence; however, it was re-censored and was given a U certificate.

== Critical response ==
The film received negative reviews. Deccan chronicle wrote: "Had the director infused a clearer and believable screenplay, the film would have ended up a decent entertainer". The Hindu criticised stating that "it is a difficult film to sit through. It could have been a lot more interesting had it simply concerned itself with the problems in juvenile detention centres. But in its present form, the film’s idealistic message isn’t new and neither is the means it employs to make it".
