= Nenjai Thodu =

- Title card
- Directed by: P.Ae. Rajkannan
- Written by: P.Ae. Rajkannan
- Produced by: M Sivakumaran; M Thoufeeq
- Starring: Gemini; Lakshmi Rai
- Cinematography: Karthikraja
- Edited by: Mohan; Subbu
- Music by: Srikanth Deva
- Production companies: Divine Creations (U.K.); DC Entertainment
- Release date: 21 September 2007
- Country: India
- Language: Tamil

Nenjai Thodu (transl. Touch the heart) is a 2007 Indian Tamil-language film directed by P. Ae. Rajkannan, starring newcomer Gemini and Lakshmi Rai. The film was produced by NRIs.

== Plot ==
The film starts with Nasser losing his wife at the birth of his second son. He starts to hate his son and even leaves home with his first child. The child grows up into Siva and he lives with his grandparents who love him so much.

Siva's brother's Krishna marriage gets fixed up. At this time, Siva meets his father again. His father still hates him and barely talks to him. This really hurts Siva. He tries to not keep it in his mind and just goes along. At this point he meets Aishwarya, who is his brother's sister-in-law. These two lock horns with each other right in their first meeting.

As time goes by, Siva and Aishwarya develop feeling towards each other. At the same point, his father also starts to like him. Unfortunately, Siva's marriage gets fixed up with another girl, chosen by his father. Now, Siva is scared to tell his father, that he loves Aishwarya, because he doesn't want to break his father's trust in him. Siva's grandfather knows about the love between Siva and Aishwarya and even tries to convince his son to get them both married, but Nasser refuses. Now, Siva is stuck between his father and his love. But fate has some other games to play.

When both Siva and Aishwarya were travelling in a train, they come to know that bomb is fixed in a train. All the passengers had come out, the train gets crashed which makes Siva think that Aishwarya is dead while Aishwarya assumes that Siva is dead, they both fall unconscious and admitted to the hospital. It is revealed that Siva's mind has damaged (doctor reveals that since his mother died his mind has become emotional) and he is under the wrong impression that Aiswarya is dead. The film ends with Siva's father and Aishwarya taking care of Siva but it is revealed that Siva's mind will become normal only after four or five months.

== Cast ==
- Gemini as Siva
- Lakshmi Rai as Aishwarya
- Nagesh as Siva's grandfather
- Nassar
- M Thoufeeq as Krishna
- Sriranjini

== Production ==
The film was set in Chennai and was shot in two palatial bungalows around Chennai and song sequences were shot at AVM studios, Hyderabad and Valparai. The film's climax was shot at a railway station near Kanchipuram.

== Soundtrack ==
Soundtrack was composed by Srikanth Deva. Lyrics by Viveka and M.G. Kaniappan. The audio launch was held at AVM Studios on 14 February 2007.

Track listing
No.	Title	Singer(s)	Length
1.	"Puthu Vasam"	Hariharan, Sadhana Sargam
2.	"Kichu Kichu"	Sangeetha
3.	"En Thai Aval"	Vijay Yesudas
4.	"LKG"	Malgudi Subha
5.	"Thondathe"	Shankar Mahadevan, Anuradha Sriram
6.	"Ulalela"	Udit Narayan, Srilekha Parthasarathy

== Critical reception ==
Malini Mannath of Chennai Online wrote, "It's a promising debut from Gemini as Siva. And with seasoned actors like Nasser and Nagesh to share frames with, the scenes come out natural. Weaved into this is the love story between Siva and his cousin Aishwaria. The playfulness and the one up-manship between the duo at one point backfires on them, leading to drastic consequences. A touch of melodrama is added towards the end". Aparna of Kalki praised the acting, Srikanth Deva's music, cinematography but called sagging screenplay and weak dialogues as negatives.
