= Ulavuthurai =

1998 Tamil action film by Ramesh Selvan

- Poster
- Directed by: D. S. Ramesh Selvan
- Screenplay by: D. S. Ramesh Selvan
- Story by: Balu Anand
- Produced by: A.S. Ibrahim Rowther (presenter); Vijay Prabhakaran
- Starring: Vijayakanth; Meena; Sanghavi
- Cinematography: Rajarajan
- Edited by: G. Gopinath
- Music by: Shah
- Production company: I. V. Cine Arts
- Distributed by: Lakshmi Movie Makers
- Release date: 14 January 1998
- Running time: 163 minutes
- Country: India
- Language: Tamil

Ulavuthurai (transl. Vigilance department) is a 1998 Indian Tamil-language action film directed by D. S. Ramesh Selvan. The film stars Vijayakanth, Meena and Sanghavi, with Radha Ravi, Janagaraj, Carlos, Jassi Singh, and Hemanth Ravan, among others, play supporting roles. It was released on 14 January 1998, and failed at the box office.

== Plot ==
Commodore Vasanth Periyasamy is a highly respected officer in the Indian Navy, known for his dedication, discipline, and unwavering sense of duty. His life, however, takes a tragic turn when his wife Meena is kidnapped by a terrorist group seeking the release of their incarcerated comrades. In a tense negotiation led by the authorities, the exchange is carried out, but things go awry during the operation, leading to Meena’s untimely death. To Vasanth’s shock, the mission is sabotaged from within, and several corrupt senior naval officials are complicit in the betrayal.

Following this incident, Vasanth becomes the target of a conspiracy orchestrated by the same corrupt officials. Branded a traitor and wrongfully imprisoned, he is stripped of his rank and honor. Disillusioned and heartbroken, he adopts a new identity—Krishnamoorthy, a humble car driver—choosing anonymity over the scars of his past. He begins a quiet life, distancing himself from his former role in the armed forces.

Years later, a series of mysterious and fatal incidents involving naval officers at sea draws the attention of the intelligence bureau. With no clear answers and national security at stake, the government discreetly approaches Vasanth to return to service and investigate the unfolding crisis. Initially reluctant, he eventually agrees, compelled by a renewed sense of duty and the opportunity to seek justice for his wife’s death and the wrongs he endured.

Operating covertly under his assumed identity, Vasanth begins unraveling a complex web of sabotage and corruption within the Navy. His investigation reveals a dangerous nexus involving international smugglers, arms dealers, and high-ranking officials who are exploiting naval operations for personal gain. As he gets closer to the truth, Vasanth must also protect his now-teenaged daughter, who is unaware of her father’s true identity and past.

The film culminates in a high-stakes confrontation at sea, where Vasanth exposes the culprits and clears his name. With honor restored and justice served, he reclaims his rightful place in the Navy, but chooses to continue living a humble life, driven not by rank or recognition, but by the values he has always upheld.

== Cast ==
- Vijayakanth as Commodore Vasanth Periyasamy (Krishnamoorthy)
- Meena as Meena
- Sanghavi as Sangeetha
- Radha Ravi as Home Minister Jaidev
- Janagaraj as Duraisamy
- Hemanth Ravan as Terrorist
- Carlos as Terrorist
- Jassi Singh as Terrorist
- Chitti as Terrorist
- Sumithra as Vasanth Periyasamy's mother
- Baby Jennifer as Priya, Vasanth's daughter
- Charuhasan as Sangeetha's grandfather
- Fathima Babu as Sangeetha's mother
- Mohan Raman as Venkatraman
- Ajay Rathnam as Ajay
- Balu Anand as Neurotic
- Sethu Vinayagam as Krishnamoorthy's boss
- Pasi Narayanan
- P. C. Ramakrishna
- Prathapachandran
- Laxmi Rattan as Sharma
- Vincent Roy as Police inspector
- Kallukkul Eeram Ramanathan as Marimuthu
- K. Rajan as Rajaram
- Pawan as dancer in song "Kandu Pidithaya" (uncredited)

== Production ==
Ulavuthurai is the directorial debut of Ramesh Selvan, and Vijayakanth's 125th film as an actor. It is the first Tamil film to have scenes shot underwater.

== Soundtrack ==
The music was composed by Shah, with lyrics written by Vairamuthu.

| Song | Singer(s) | Duration |
|---|---|---|
| "Meena un Kannukulle" | K. S. Chithra, Mano | 5:09 |
| "Kandu Piditthaya" | Swarnalatha | 4:23 |
| "Love Love" | Annupamaa, Harini | 4:47 |
| "Naadu Nam Naadu" | Mano | 1:43 |
| "Nitham Uzhaikindra" | S. P. Balasubrahmanyam | 4:58 |
| "Ullatthai Thirandhu" | K. S. Chithra, Madhu Balakrishnan | 5:16 |

== Reception ==
Ji of Kalki wrote this film is a treat for action lovers otherwise for people who except Vijayakanth from Chinna Gounder and Vaidehi Kathirunthal will end up getting different kind of alva. D. S. Ramanujam of The Hindu wrote, "Time lag and continuity have been given a go by and barring the last fight on a moving train, where the hero Vijayakanth involves himself in a risky scene, the rest of the action is an oft- repeated routine". He added that "Age is fast catching up with Vijayakanth, but none can fault his performance".
