= Jananam =

- Promotional poster
- Directed by: S. D. Ramesh Selvan
- Written by: Balakumaran (dialogue)
- Produced by: K. M. Noorjehan
- Starring: Arun Vijay; Priyanka Trivedi
- Cinematography: N. Raghav
- Music by: Bharadwaj
- Production company: Crescent Movie International
- Distributed by: Dream World Cinemas
- Release date: 17 December 2004
- Running time: 134 minutes
- Country: India
- Language: Tamil

Jananam (transl. Birth) is a 2004 Tamil language action drama film directed by S. D. Ramesh Selvan. The film stars Arun Vijay (credited as Arun Kumar) and Priyanka Trivedi in lead roles, while Ashish Vidyarthi, Raghuvaran, Nassar, Vadivelu, and Charle play supporting roles. The music was composed by Bharadwaj. The film was launched in 2002, but got delayed and was released in 2004.

== Plot ==
Surya (Arun Vijay), an angry young man is a post-graduate student looking for a job. His girlfriend is Shruthi (Priyanka Trivedi), who always tries to control his rage as he fights against injustice in society. Once, Surya fights for a friend, Ganesh (Charle), who is a gold medalist but does not get a job as he is not able to get a loan from a bank because he does not have any collateral to pledge. Sasi (Munna), another gold medalist friend of Surya, dies in an accident after running helter-skelter hunting for a job. All these events change Surya’s life, especially after he meets a well-known writer and intellectual Udhaya Moorthy (Raghuvaran), who urges him, along with others, to start a movement against corruption and injustice in society. They start an Unemployed Graduate Association, which rubs the local politician and don Muthukaruppan (Ashish Vidyarthi) the wrong way. The idealist Surya turns into a raging force after Murthy is shot dead by police and he is jailed. In jail, he is brutally tortured by the police as he becomes a rallying point for the youths who are fighting unemployment.

== Cast ==
- Arun Vijay as Surya
- Priyanka Trivedi as Shruthi
- Ashish Vidyarthi as Muthukaruppan
- Raghuvaran as Udhaya Moorthy
- Nassar as Shekar
- Vadivelu
- Charle as Ganesh
- Munna as Sasi
- Kalairani as Sasi's mother
- Nizhalgal Ravi as Chandrasekhar
- Mahanadi Shankar as Police Inspector
- C. R. Saraswathi as Malar
- Crane Manohar
- Nellai Siva as Muthukaruppan's PA
- Theni Kunjarammal as Bystander
- Kumarimuthu
- Siva Narayana Murthy
- Thyagu as MD
- Singamuthu
- Muthukaalai
- Benjamin
- Rajesh as Chief Minister
- Kalidaas as Inspector Kalidaas
- Nanditha as Special appearance in the song "Ore Oru Mutham"

== Production ==
The film was announced in 2002 with Arun Kumar and Priyanka Trivedi playing lead roles. The film got delayed by a year due to financing problems and Priyanka's marriage. It was finally released in 2004. Priyanka was not able to work on the film after her marriage, and her remaining portios were shot with Nanditha Jennifer.

== Soundtrack ==
The soundtrack was composed by Bharadwaj, with lyrics written by Vairamuthu, P. Vijay, Snehan and Yugabharathi.

Jananam

Soundtrack album by Bharadwaj
- Released: 15 October 2004
- Genre: Feature film soundtrack
- Producer: Bharadwaj

Bharadwaj chronology
Amma Appa Chellam (2004)	Jananam (2004)	Ayya (2005)

No.	Song	Singers	Lyrics	Length (m:ss)
1	"Ore Oru Mutham"	Karthik, Srilekha Parthasarathy	Snehan	04:06
2	"Pidivadham Pidikathae"	Ranjith, Mahathi	Snehan	05:30
3	"Sushmitha Kiss Thantha"	Tippu	Yugabharathi	04:20
4	"Enge Thavarugal"	Bharadwaj	Snehan	03:31
5	"Sudum Varai Neruppu"	Karthik, Tippu, Timmy, Yugendran, MK Balaji	Vairamuthu	05:19
6	"Neethaane Emmele"	Harish Raghavendra, Chinmayi	Pa. Vijay	05:20

== Reception ==
The Hindu wrote: "DESPITE A rather irrelevant and unrealistic theme that offers little support to the story and cast, if Crescent Movie International's "Jananam" is able to garner appreciation, much of the credit goes to the film's hero, Arun Kumar. The actor has slogged it out and the diligence shows. Be it action, emotion or subdued expression, Arun Kumar comes out with a commendable show in every frame. Sify wrote:" The story, plot development and packaging is old wine in a new bottle and has a hangover of films like Sethu and Nanda . Still it is watchable and has a positive message that unemployed youth can change the way of the society and administration, provided they are focused". Karthika Rukmanykanthan of Daily News wrote: "The film begins with violence and finds the solution in peace talks. The story is weak and so is the screen play. The director focuses more on his punch dialogues and student revolution rather than building a story with flowing scenes to stimulate interest.

Malini Mannath of Chennai Online wrote: "Director Ramesh may not have been able to convey all that he wanted to, nor in the exact way he had wanted to. But he should be commended for taking up a film with a message, and for his sincerity in depicting the plight of the educated unemployed from the poorer strata of society". Visual Dasan of Kalki wrote although the technical elements like music and cinematography have become secondary since the director has acted like a terrorist to touch the problem of the film, there is sulphurous smell in this Jananam. Cinesouth wrote "The Director Ramesh had taken up the issue of unemployment but he has a screenplay which creates no interest in the proceedings of the film. Throughout the film, there are many a boring scenes, except very few scenes".
