= Yugendran =

Indian actor and playback singer (born 1976)

- Born: Yugendran Vasudevan; 20 December 1976 (age 49); Madras, Tamil Nadu, India
- Citizenship: India; Malaysia; New Zealand
- Occupations: Actor, Playback singer
- Years active: 1987–2013; 2023–present
- Spouse: Hayma Malini
- Children: 3

Yugendran Vasudevan (born 20 December 1976) is an Indian actor and playback singer who has sung several songs in Tamil, Telugu and Malayalam. He is also an occasional music director and television host.

== Personal life ==
Yugendran is the son of the late Malaysian origin Tamil language playback singer-actor Malaysia Vasudevan. He has two sisters named Pavithra and Prashanthini. Prashanthini is a Tamil playback singer as well and has sung in films such as 12B, Veyil and Vaaranam Aayiram.

Yugendran performed in the Launch of a Tamil radio station in Sri Lanka called Swarna Oli in 1999, where he met his wife, Hayma Malini, a popular RJ host. His wife Hayma Malini who was born and raised in Singapore, holds an Singapore citizenship. Together they have three children, Visashan Naarayan(21 yrs), Kishan Naarayan (20 yrs) and Darshan Naarayan Nair (11 yrs). He, his wife and children had previously resided in India, Malaysia and Singapore. They currently reside in Auckland, New Zealand and he runs his own events company Rambutan Media Works NZ Limited and Aroha NZ Charitable Trust.

== Music career ==
Yugendran started out in the music industry as a Mridangamist and made his debut solo performance at the age of 10. His Mridangam Arangetram had M. Balamuralikrishna accompanying him on the viola and was attended by Ilaiyaraaja himself. His first song was for the movie Uzhavan Magan, where he sang the shepherd boy's voice. He went on to sing in stage shows with his father in India as well as overseas. Till the age of 14, he used to sing the female portion of the duets his father rendered on stage. After his voice broke, he went on to do solo performances in countries such as Switzerland, Sri Lanka, Singapore, Malaysia and United States, even before becoming a playback singer.

Yugendran's debut as a playback singer was with the song "Pollaachi Santhaiyile" in the film Rojavanam. He has sung in the music of the Ilaiyaraaja and also the Oscar award winner A. R. Rahman and the younger music directors such Yuvan Shankar Raja, Srikanth Deva, Sirpy and Adithyan.

He has composed music for Veeramum Eeramum, Nenjathai Killadhe, Balam, Nellai Santhippu and Kathalaanain.

== Acting career ==
Yugendran was initially supposed to make his acting debut through Raja Kantheeban's Mouname in 1998, but the project was shelved. His debut was in the movie Poovellam Un Vasam (2001) opposite Ajith Kumar and Jyothika. He went on to doing more movies with Vijay. He has acted in TV serials such Kolangal, Megala and Idhayam. He has acted in TV Dramas in countries such as Singapore and Malaysia. He has acted as a hero in Kaiyodu Kai (2003), Ulla Kadathal (2005), Pachai Nirame (2008) and Kaazh (2024).

== Host ==
Yugendran started out hosting Musical programs on Jaya TV and went on to hosting more musical shows on Sun TV and VJ TV. He then was also roped in to host other genre programs, especially reality programs such as Treasure Hunt on Jaya TV and a couples contest show on the same Channel. Recently he has organised online 8 hours music tribute to his father Thiru. Malaysia Vasudevan on 75th Birthday with all renowned singers

== TV Producer ==
Yugendran started a company called Rambutan Productions in India and Rambutan Media Works in Singapore. He is currently producing programs for India, Singapore, Malaysia and Sri Lanka. He runs the company with his wife, Hayma Malini. He did TV shows in Singapore under Rambutan Media Works, which includes Endrendrum Punnagai (Film Based), Sollathaan Ninaikirain (Talk show), Vidumurai Vasantham (Holiday Variety), Kondaattam (info-ed) and Achamillai Achamillai (Talk show for women by women). Rambutan Media Works is now changed to 23 Frames Pte Ltd. and is currently producing the children's variety series "Vilaiyaattu Pasanga" (). He also directed a Reality Game Show on Starhub Varnam Television. He acted in a Singapore Tele-movie Sathurangam, which was telecasted in Singapore on Father's Day 2016 on Vasantham (MediaCorp).

== Filmography ==
=== As actor ===
Year	Film	Role	Notes
2001	Poovellam Un Vasam	Karna	
2002	Enge Enadhu Kavithai	Auto driver	Special appearance
2002	Youth	Pratap	
2002	Bagavathi	Anand	
2002	Kadhal Samrajyam		Unreleased
2003	Student Number 1	Sathya	
2003	Kaiyodu Kai	Manik (Manikkam)	
2003	Anbe Anbe	Shiva	
2003	Thayumanavan	Veeramuthu	
2004	Madurey	Jeevan	
2004	Oru Murai Sollividu	Sundar	
2005	Thirupachi	Inspector Veluchamy	
2005	Ulla Kadathal	Robert	
2005	Alaiyadikkuthu	R.G Madhu	
2005	Saadhuriyan		
2006	Amirtham	Veerayan	
2007	Mudhal Kanave	David	
2008	Nenjathai Killadhe	Inspector Meyyappan	
2008	Muniyandi Vilangial Moonramandu	Raju	
2008	Pachai Nirame	Manoj	
2009	Kannukulle	Dhanasekhar	
2009	Newtonin Moondram Vidhi	Deva	
2009	Rajadhi Raja	Advocate	
2011	Yuddham Sei	Inba	
2012	Kathalaanain	Aravind	Singapore film
2013	Vizha	Manimaaran	
2024	Kaazh	Seenu	Lead role
2024	The Greatest of All Time	Abdul	
2025	Lenin Pandiyan	Ravi	

=== As singer ===
List of songs sung by Yugendran

Year	Song name	Album name	Co-singers	Music
1997	"Un Perai Kettale"	Poonjolai	Bhavatharini	Ilayaraja
1997	Kozhi Vandhadha	Aahaa..!	Anuradha Sriram, Malaysia Vasudevan, Sujatha	Deva
1999	"Pollachi Sandhaiyile"	Rojavanam		Bharadwaj
1999	Oh Mariya	Kadhalar Dhinam	Devan, Febi Mani	A. R. Rahman
1999	Oh Mariya	Premikula Roju - Telugu (D)	Devan, Febi Mani	A. R. Rahman
2000	Koodaimela Kooda Vetchu	Kannan Varuvaan	K.S. Chitra, S. P. B. Charan	Sirpy
2000	Parthen Parthen	Parthen Rasithen	Reshmi	Bharadwaj
2001	A Samba A Samba	Pandavar Bhoomi	Subha, TL. Maharajan	Bharadwaj
2001	"Thozha Thozha"	Pandavar Bhoomi	Chtira Sivaraman	Bharadwaj
2001	Poddale Kaddila	Kathal Jaathi	Yuvan Shankar Raja	Ilayaraja
2002	Aadi Aadi Vamma	Indran (dubbed)	Srivarthini	Mani Sharma
2002	Cherry Cherry Oh Cherry	Love Channel	Anuradha Sriram	Deva
2002	Mullai Poo	Kadhal Samrajyam	S.P.B.Charan, Venkat Prabhu	Yuvan Shankar Raja
2002	Oh Shalalala Jamaai	Junior Senior	Prem, Yuvan Shankar Raja	Yuvan Shankar Raja
2002	Rosapoo Uthadula	Thamizh	Anuradha Sriram	Bharadwaj
2002	"Picaso Oviyam"	Royal Family	Prasad	Bharani
2003	Autograph	I Love You Daa	Pop Shalini	Bharadwaj
2003	Carolinaa	Kadhal Sadugudu	Karthik	Deva
2003	Kalyanamthan Katti	Saamy	Kay Kay, Srilekha Parthasarathy	Harris Jeyaraj
2003	Muthal Muthalai	Lesa Lesa	Srimathumitha, Tippu	Harris Jeyaraj
2004	Kilakke Paarthen	Autograph		Bharadwaj
2004	"Sudumvarai Neruppu"	Jananam	Balaji, Karthik, Timmy, Tippu	Bharadwaj
2005	Enna Parkurai	Thavamai Thavamirundhu	Suchitra	Sabesh–Murali
2005	Mekki Mekki	Kaadhal Thirudaa	Anuradha Sriram	Bharani
2005	Vilakkuvonu Thiriya Paarkudhu	Devathayai Kanden	Malathi	Deva
2008	Nenjathai Killadhe	Nenjathai Killadhe	Prashanthini	Premji Amaren
2008	Oru Mathiri	Kee Mu	Prashanthini	Elngo Kalaivanan
2008	Suthuthae Suthuthaey	Nepali		Srikanth Deva
2010	Adida! Nayaandiya	Goa	S.P.B.Charan	Yuvan Shankar Raja
2024	Manasilaayo	Vettaiyan	Malaysia Vasudevan, (Note: Via artificial intelligence.) Anirudh Ravichander, Deepthi Suresh	Anirudh Ravichander
2026	Kalyana Virundhu	Dorothy	Anthony Daasan, Priya Jerson	Ilaiyaraja

=== As music director ===
Year	Film	Notes
2007	Veeramum Eeramum	
2008	Nenjathai Killadhe	composed only one song
2009	Balam	
2011	Nellai Santhippu	
2012	Kathalaanain	

=== Television ===
Year	Programme / Show	Role	Channel	Language	Notes
2004–2007	Kolangal	Shivadas	Sun TV	Tamil	
2007–2009	Megala	Vishwam	Sun TV	Tamil	
2008–2009	Super Singer	Host	Vijay TV	Tamil	
2023	Bigg Boss Tamil 7	Contestant	Vijay TV	Tamil	Evicted Day 28
