= Trivikrama Mahadeva =

Indian undertaker

- Born: Mahadeva; 29 September 1962
- Died: 14 July 2022 (aged 60); Bangalore, India

Trivikrama Mahadeva (Kannada: ತ್ರಿವಿಕ್ರಮ ಮಹಾದೇವ) (29 September 1962 – 14 July 2022) is the name of an undertaker in the city of Bangalore, India who ferries unclaimed bodies and organizes their funeral. He has so far organized funeral of over 88,888 human bodies. In November 1999, he was awarded the Chief Minister's Gold Medal by the Chief Minister of Karnataka, S. M. Krishna.

== Early life ==
Mahadeva was born in a village near the town of Nanjangud in the Mysore district of Karnataka. His mother left her home village, taking her young son with her, following an unknown insult when Mahadeva was about 4. When he was about 7 and living in the town of Chamarajanagar, his mother fell seriously ill and the doctors suggested that she should be admitted to a hospital in Bangalore, a journey which took four years and was financed by selling bits of Mahadeva's mother's jewelry. Once in Bangalore, the pair spent some days outside of Victoria Hospital, not knowing the procedure to get admitted until they elicited the help of a ward orderly by giving him the rest of the jewelry. The medical attention, however, proved insufficient and Mahadeva's mother died soon after being admitted, a fact which only became known to Mahadeva two weeks later. After waiting the customary 3 days for someone to claim the body, the hospital undertaker had buried Mahadeva's mother's body. Since Mahadeva had lost his mother, the people around raised about Rs. 12 to send him back to his village. But Mahadeva refused to go back and instead decided to stay with the undertaker. Mahadeva fondly started to call the man Thatha (which means grandpa in Kannada), a relationship which led him to his present career. By the age of 12, Mahadeva had started to ferry 3 or 4 bodies at a time on a cart to the burial ground on Mysore Road. When he decided to marry a girl named Pushpalatha, his future father-in-law demanded Rs. 2000 as bride money, which was a huge sum for Mahadeva to raise but after saving money and with the help of well-wishers he collected the required sum and married Pushpalatha.

== Career ==
Mahadeva had buried around a thousand bodies when he had to bury his Thatha. After facing this personal loss, Mahadeva took it upon himself to garland each body he buried and accord whatever respect that he could to the deceased. Although he was paid Rs. 200 for each body, he earned only Rs. 25 per body after covering all expenses required for burial. All the bodies he buried had to be autopsied, certified and buried properly. He had a horse-driven cart that helped him in ferrying bodies, and he operated in relative obscurity until the Kannada magazine Sudha discovered him and published a story about his life. He was also the subject of a television documentary. This exposure lead to him being awarded the title of Kaliyuga Trivikrama, making his proper name Trivikrama Mahadeva.

In 1982, while burying the remains of people who had died when the Gangaram's building crashed in Bangalore, he slipped and fell into the grave and was covered by a heap of bodies. He was rescued when he managed to draw the attention of the undertaker, who pulled Mahadeva from the bodies.

In 1991, he was selected to ferry the body of Sivarasan, one of the people responsible for planning the assassination of the former Indian Prime Minister, Rajiv Gandhi. Sivarasan was killed in police firing in a house in Konanakunte, a suburb of Bangalore. The police wanted to cremate Sivarasan's body in complete secrecy and selected Mahadeva for the job. Mahadeva's horse-driven cart was escorted with 2 police jeeps and the body was cremated in an electric crematorium.

== Death ==
Mahadeva lived in poverty and was even forced to sell his horse and cart as well as his Chief Minister's gold medal to raise money to pay off some debts. At one point, the Mayor of Bangalore donated him Rs. 25000 to buy a three-wheeled vehicle. The Indian Railways have also provided him with a cell phone and well-wishers have provide him with free petrol. His son Praveen used to accompany him to the burials during weekends and vacations.

Mahadeva, who suffered from stage three lung cancer, died on 14 July 2022 at the age of 60.

== Awards and honours ==
Mahadeva has been awarded the following honours:

- Chief Minister's Gold Medal in the year 1999
- Kempe Gowda award in the year 2004
- Godfrey Phillips Bravery Award for Social Acts of Courage in the year 2006
