= Newtonin Moondram Vidhi =

- Poster
- Directed by: Thai Muthuselvan
- Story by: Chidambaram
- Produced by: Madras Entertainment
- Starring: S. J. Suryah; Rajiv Krishna; Sayali Bhagat
- Cinematography: Saravanan
- Music by: F. S. Faizal
- Production company: Madras Entertainment
- Release date: 1 May 2009
- Country: India
- Language: Tamil

Newtonin Moondram Vidhi (transl. Newton's third law) is a 2008 Indian Tamil-language action thriller film directed by debutant Thai Muthuselvan, who earlier directed television series Kaathu Karuppu for Vijay TV. It stars S. J. Suryah, Rajiv Krishna, and Sayali Bhagat, while Yugendran, Sashikumar Subramani, Thalaivasal Vijay, and Chaams play supporting roles. The music was composed by Vinay with cinematography by Saravanan. It was released on 1 May 2009.

== Plot ==
The film opens with a grim, bearded, and angry young man named Guru (S. J. Surya) paying tributes to his former lover Priya (Sayali Bhagat) in a graveyard.

In a flashback, their love story is told. Guru, a fashion designer, falls head over heels for Priya, an anchor working in Eagle TV's music channel. After initial hiccups, both fall in love and decide to get married. However, things turn awry when the aggressive, almost maniacal channel owner Jayaprakash Narayanan alias JP (Rajiv Krishna) has a psychotic obsession for Priya and harasses her. On the eve of Priya's wedding, JP kidnaps her, frames Guru in a false case, puts Priya on virtual house arrest, ties her hands to the bed and brutally rapes and kills Priya, and makes it look like a suicide.

Back to the present, Guru and his friend Raghu (Sashikumar Subramani) work in the channel, and Guru meticulously plans for a year to take revenge. In a chilling and cold-blooded way, Guru tells JP that the latter will be dead at 12:00 PM, but JP does not know who is speaking. Guru threatens JP to use his old friend's car and go to Koyambedu. JP calls his henchman Deva (Yugendran) to kill him, but Guru, knowing this, manages to get him beat up. He comes and saves JP but arranges income tax officers to arrest JP for having black money in the car. He also threatens JP that he would send him a video that has JP giving money to the minister (John Amrithraj).

JP identifies that it is Guru doing this work because Priya was killed on Valentine's Day, so he plans to take revenge on Guru by killing him. Guru, working as a pizza delivery boy, catches and beats JP. Guru then surrenders himself to the police to escape from JP, though he tells the police about JP. Guru comes to JP and tells that JP's lover, who was cheated by him, has uploaded the rape video of Priya by him. Guru ties and beats JP and cries for Priya's death. However, Deva beats Guru and JP breaks his hands.

Finally, in the climax (inspired from an English movie Shoot 'Em Up), when Guru is unable to hold the gun properly and shoot, he places the cartridges between his fingers and gets his hand close to the fire, by which he performs the action of a gun using his hand and kills JP at 12 PM sharp.

== Cast ==
- S. J. Suryah as Gurumoorthy (Guru)
- Rajiv Krishna as Jayaprakash Narayanan (JP)
- Sayali Bhagat as Priya
- Yugendran as Deva
- Sashikumar Subramani as Raghu
- Thalaivasal Vijay as Inspector
- Tharika as Metro Mallika
- Chaams as Rangaswamy
- John Amrithraj as Minister
- Sathyapriya
- Lollu Sabha Balaji
- Neelima Rani
- Nellai Siva

== Production ==
The film marked the directorial debut of Thai Muthu Selvan who primarily directed television serials, it remained the only film he had made before his death in December 2022. The shooting was proceeding at a fast pace came to a halt when S. J. Suryah hurt himself at the shooting spot during a fight sequence on ECR. Suryah was on a motorbike, and the injury resulted in a scar on his face.

== Soundtrack ==
Music is composed by newcomer F. S. Faizal, under the name Vinay.

- "Kadhal Dandora" — Krish
- "Ummachi" — Ranjith, Shalini
- "Mudhal Murai" — S. J. Surya, Sunitha Sarathy, Sam P. Keerthan
- "Paraparakura" — Naresh Iyer, Srilekha Parthasarathy
- "Newtonin Moondram Vidhi" — Sam P. Keerthan

== Critical reception ==
Sify wrote, "it is an engaging thriller which will keep you glued to your seats". Rediff.com wrote, "Newton's Third Law has been illustrated painstakingly and packaged with all the commercial elements intact".
