= F. S. Faizal =

Indian music composer

- Born: Chennai, Tamil Nadu, India
- Genre: Film score
- Occupations: Film music composer, music director
- Years active: 2009–present

F. S. Faizal is an Indian music composer who graduated from Trinity College London. He was trained under Abdul Sattar until he reached the eighth grade. He was a former advertisement jingles composer who worked on over 275 jingles in the likes of Vasanth & Co, Credai, and Jaipur Gems. He made his film production debut in the Tamil film Newtonin Moondram Vidhi and then made a breakthrough with his work in Sillunu Oru Sandhippu. Other notable films he helped with where Vajram and Tharkappu, which both got accolades. He is now working on the film Thani Mugam, which is under post-production.

== Career ==
Faizal composed his first film album, Newtonin Moondram Vidhi, under the stage name of Vinay, before moving on to compose music for Kalavaram in 2011. In 2013, he worked on Sillunu Oru Sandhippu, which became his third album release and received positive reviews for his work on the songs. A critic from Sify.com criticised his work on the film's background score, stating that it was "too loud". Faizal has since worked on two low budget films featuring Sree Raam, as well as on Tharkappu. Faizal had done music for the film, Pizhai. He has worked on independent Tamil films originating from Tamil diaspora directors that settled in France such as DOT and Encounter Hall.

== Discography ==
=== Released soundtracks ===
- The films are listed in the order that the music released, regardless of the date the film released
- The year next to the title of the affected films indicates the release year of either a dubbed or a remade version in the named language after the original version
- • indicates original language release. Indicates simultaneous makes, if the film is featured in more languages
- ♦ indicates a remade version, the remaining ones being dubbed versions

| Year | Album | Notes |
|---|---|---|
| 2009 | Newtonin Moondram Vidhi • | |
| 2011 | Kalavaram • | |
| 2013 | Sillunu Oru Sandhippu • | |
| 2014 | Kaadhal 2014 • | |
| 2015 | Vajram • | |
| 2015 | Kamara Kattu • | |
| 2015 | Buddhanin Sirippu | Background score |
| 2015 | Tharkappu • | |
| 2020 | Pizhai • | |
| 2022 | Sivi 2 • | |
| 2020 | Thani Mugam | Under production |
