= Sivasakthi Movie Makers =

Indian film company, founded 1996

- Type: Film production Film distribution
- Industry: Entertainment
- Founded: 1996
- Headquarters: Chennai, India
- Key people: Sivasakthi Pandian
- Products: Motion pictures (Tamil)

Sivasakthi Movie Makers is an Indian film production and distribution company headed by Sivasakthi Pandian. The film had been a leading production studio in the Tamil film industry in the 1990s, but has struggled following the switch to digital film-making. The studio has made eleven films, all of which have music composed by Deva.

== History ==
Beginning his career as a film distributor and exhibitor owning the Sivasakthi Cinema in Padi in Chennai. Sivasakthi Pandian eventually moved into production. He used the profits he had made from distributing Muthu (1995) to finance his debut film Vaanmathi (1996) starring Ajith and directed by Agathiyan. Vaanmathi became successful which prompted Pandian to collaborate with actor, director and crew of Vaanmathi for Kadhal Kottai (1996) which became a blockbuster and remains a cult-classic.

Following the release of director Agathiyan's Kadhal Kottai (1996), aspiring director R. Balu claimed that Agathiyan had stolen the story of the film from his half-complete venture Un Ninaivaaga. To appease Balu, producer Sivasakthi Pandian offered him the chance to make a film for the studio. Balu subsequently made his directorial debut with the romantic film Kaalamellam Kadhal Vaazhga (1997), featuring Murali and newcomer Kausalya in the leading roles and won critical acclaim for his first venture. A reviewer from Indolink.com stated that "overall, if it is a long time since you saw a movie with good comedy, above average music and crystal clear photography, here is one for you." Murali later played tribute to the studio for giving him several successful films.

In 2000, two films that the studio produced — Vetri Kodi Kattu and Kadal Pookkal — won National Film Awards. Pandian considered making a religious film Arupadai Veedu on the deity Murugan soon after, featuring Murali and Devayani, but the venture did not materialise. Similarly, a project by G. S. Krishnan titled Naagaa planned with Prashanth was also dropped soon after its announcement.

The studio effectively collapsed during the production of its twelfth film, Arjunan Kadhali starring Jai and Poorna. The film started production in 2008 and progressed slowly and by December 2010, Jai revealed he had finished his portions for the film. Despite finishing production, the film was delayed by distributor Ayngaran International's financial problems and has since remained unreleased. In February 2013, Sivasakthi Pandian was able to censor the film, while the music of the film was released two months later. In 2015, Cheran took up responsibility of releasing the film through his new straight-to-DVD platform of C2H, but the failure of the venture meant that the release of Arjunan Kadhali was delayed.

Following the studio's slowdown, Pandian has taken up roles including a post at the Tamil Film Producers Council, and as a censor board member.

== Filmography ==
Title	Year	Language	Director	Cast	Synopsis	Ref.
Vaanmathi	1996	Tamil	Agathiyan	Ajith Kumar, Swathi	Krishna belongs to a middle-class family and his father does not have a very good reputation. Krishna falls in love with Vaanmathi, the daughter of a rich businesswoman who is against the alliance.	
Kadhal Kottai	1996	Tamil	Agathiyan	Ajith Kumar, Devayani, Heera	Kamali loses her bag in the railway station. Later, her bag is sent to her home, along with a letter from Surya, who found it. Kamali and Surya send letters to each other and soon fall in love without seeing each other.	
Kaalamellam Kadhal Vaazhga	1997	Tamil	R. Balu	Murali, Kausalya, Gemini Ganesan	A poor singer befriends a college student from a wealthy family through the phone. They soon fall in love with each other despite never having met each other in person.	
Kaadhale Nimmadhi	1998	Tamil	Indhran	Suriya, Murali, Jeevitha Sharma, Sangeetha	Kavita is to be married to Chandramohan. But her brother suspects that she is having an affair with Chandru, an archaeologist, when in fact they are strangers.	
Kannedhirey Thondrinal	1998	Tamil	Ravichandran	Prashanth, Simran, Karan	Vasanth learns that the girl he is in love with is his best friend, Shankar's, sister. When Shankar shares his bitter past with Vasanth, he decides to sacrifice his love to protect his friendship.	
Kanave Kalaiyadhe	1999	Tamil	V. Gowthaman	Murali, Simran	Just as everything was falling into place for Anand, he is distraught when the girl he loves dies in a blast. Fate plays yet another trick on him when he finds himself face to face with her lookalike.	
Vetri Kodi Kattu	2000	Tamil	Cheran	Murali, Parthiban, Meena	Sekhar and Muthuraman are duped by a conman who promises to give them visas to fly to Dubai. Realising that their families might get hurt, they decide to exchange their addresses.	
Kadal Pookkal	2001	Tamil	Bharathiraja	Murali, Manoj Bharathiraja, Sindhu Menon, Uma	Karuthaiya and Peter are inseparable friends. They marry each other's sisters and decide to take revenge against a man who abandons Peter's sister after impregnating her.	
Ramakrishna	2005	Tamil	Agathiyan	Jai Akash, Sridevika	Ramakrishnan, a millionaire, stays with his mother and is not in touch with anyone from his family. After her death, he decides to go to the village in search of his long lost relatives.	
Suriyan Satta Kalloori	2009	Tamil	R. Pavan	Kajni, Mithra Kurian, Pawan	A real incident which happened in a Law College shook the city of Chennai. The film is based on the same bizarre incidents from the college.	
