= Anbe Un Vasam =

2003 Tamil film

- DVD cover
- Directed by: R. Balu
- Written by: R. Balu
- Produced by: Azhagan Thamizhmani
- Starring: Ashwin; Rathi Arumugam; Yogan
- Cinematography: Abdul Rahman
- Edited by: V. T. Vijayan
- Music by: Dhina
- Production company: Annai Vannamathi Films
- Release date: 5 December 2003
- Running time: 125 minutes
- Country: India
- Language: Tamil

Anbe Un Vasam (transl. Dear, your residence) is a 2003 Indian Tamil-language romantic drama film directed by R. Balu. The film stars newcomer Ashwin, Rathi Arumugam and newcomer Yogan, with Karunas, Raghuvaran, Meera Krishnan, Pallavi, Vinu Chakravarthy, Pandu, Madhan Bob, and Manobala, among others, playing supporting roles. It was released on 5 December 2003.

== Plot ==
Ashwin (Ashwin), who is from Ooty, moves to Chennai to join college in the final year. After a not-so-pleasant initial meeting, Ashwin slowly falls in love with his college mate Bharathi (Rathi Arumugam). She later understands his true love and reciprocates. After completing their studies, they meet in a temple. Ashwin fears that they might get separated and asks Bharathi to marry him right away at the registrar office, but Bharathi, who is a practical girl, has other plans. She wants Ashwin to find a job, and then she would marry him with the consent of her family. Ashwin cannot trust her since he had witnessed many lovers getting separated during their college year. An offended Bharathi scolds him for his lack of trust in her and runs away in hurt and anger. Ashwin goes back to Ooty, while Bharathi and her family relocate to Coimbatore.

Two years later, at the alumni reunion, Ashwin meets his old friends and Bharathi along with Ashok (Yogan), a family friend. Ashok tells Ashwin that he will soon marry Bharathi. Later that evening, Bharathi said to Ashwin that she was not aware of it. She then swears that she will definitely marry him and apologizes to him for running away that day. When she came home, her parents reveal that they have found a groom for her: Ashok. She convinces her parents about their marriage. Thereafter, Ashwin finds a government job in Coonoor. Ashwin and Bharathi then desperately try to contact each other; thus, Bharathi decides to go to his workplace. When she arrives at Coonoor, heavy rain was occurring over the hills, and it triggered landslides that swept aside everything in its path. Ashwin's office collapsed in front of Bharathi; in shock, she passed out. Many hours later, the rescue personnel found Bharathi and Ashwin. Ashwin survived, whereas Bharathi died of her wounds.

== Cast ==
- Ashwin as Ashwin
- Rathi Arumugam as Bharathi
- Yogan as Ashok
- Karunas as JK
- Raghuvaran as V. Rathinavel Pandian
- Meera Krishnan as Jaishree, Bharathi's mother
- Pallavi as Ashwin's mother
- Vinu Chakravarthy as MP
- Anu Mohan as College Chairman
- Vennira Aadai Moorthy as Professor Kalivaradhan
- Pandu as Professor
- Madhan Bob as Professor
- Manobala as Professor
- Hemalatha as Hema, Ashwin's sister
- Vinayak Raj as Mathi, Bharathi's brother
- Vaiyapuri as Hussain
- Kottachi as Student
- Loose Mohan
- K. Sivasankar
- Lavanya
- Shobana as Shoba
- Poochi Senthil as Napoleon
- Saathappan Nandakumar
- Prem Menon
- Valli Rajan
- Sorna
- Rajmohan
- Sarath Chandra
- Kovai Senthil
- Pandiyan in a guest appearance
- Chaams as College Student (uncredited)

== Production ==
R. Balu who directed romantic films such as Kaalamellam Kadhal Vaazhga (1997) and Unnudan (1998) launched the new face Ashwin as the hero in Anbe Un Vasam. Before coming to films, Ashwin had learnt filmy dance and stunt apart from taking up the acting course from Film Institute. Rathi Arumugam signed to play the female lead role while the producer's son was introduced as a second hero. Dhina was signed on to compose the film's soundtrack and Abdul Rahman's was chosen to handle the camera. Two songs were picturised in Mauritius and the film producer stated, "We were given full police protection from Mauritius Government and also The Film Development Corporation of Mauritius were very helpful". The filming was also held at Ooty.

== Soundtrack ==
The film score and the soundtrack were composed by Dhina.

Song	Singer(s)	Lyrics	Duration
"Aasarai Vaithai"	Hariharan	Vaali	4:27
"Color Varadhu"	Manikka Vinayagam, Tippu, Srividya	Kadhal Mathi	4:36
"Ore Oru Paarvaiyaal"	Karthik, Sadhana Sargam	Pa. Vijay	5:01
"Thirumugam"	Chinmayi	Piraisoodan	3:19
"Yenga Pora"	Udit Narayan, Pop Shalini	Kanmani Subbu	4:16
"Yengaavathu"	Shankar Mahadevan, Sujatha	Kabilan	4:54

== Reception ==
A reviewer criticized the film's plot holes and the poor acting of Ashwin and he added that the only saving grace of the film was Rathi. Sify wrote "R.Balu who had earlier done Kaalemaellam Kadhal Vazhka, [..] his attempt has misfired with a bad script, no newness in presentation and lacklustre performance from the hero."
