= Krishna Leele =

- Theatrical release poster
- Directed by: D. Rajendra Babu
- Written by: Somaraj (dialogues)
- Screenplay by: D. Rajendra Babu
- Story by: Agathiyan
- Based on: Gokulathil Seethai (1996)
- Produced by: Rockline Venkatesh
- Starring: Shiva Rajkumar; Ananth Nag; Suvalakshmi
- Cinematography: B. C. Gowrishankar
- Edited by: Shyam
- Music by: V. Manohar
- Production company: Rockline Productions
- Release date: 5 May 2000
- Running time: 145 minutes
- Country: India
- Language: Kannada

Krishna Leele is a 2000 Indian Kannada-language drama film directed by D. Rajendra Babu and produced by Rockline Venkatesh. The film stars Shiva Rajkumar, Ananth Nag, and debutant Suvalakshmi.

The film was a remake of director Agathiyan's Tamil film Gokulathil Seethai (1996).

== Cast ==
- Shiva Rajkumar as Krishna
- Ananth Nag
- Suvalakshmi as Seetha
- Umashree
- Mohan Shankar
- Mandeep Roy
- Ashalatha
- Lakshman

== Soundtrack ==
The soundtrack of the film was composed by V. Manohar who wrote the lyrics with K. Kalyan and R. N. Jayagopal.

Track listing
No.	Title	Lyrics	Singer(s)	Length
1.	"Krishna Nee Begane Baaro"	V. Manohar	S. P. Balasubrahmanyam
2.	"Chanda O Chanda"	K. Kalyan	K. S. Chithra
3.	"Kelo Geleyane"	R. N. Jayagopal	K. S. Chithra
4.	"Kande Kande Ondu Hennu"	R. N. Jayagopal	Rajesh Krishnan, Nanditha
5.	"Gokuladalli Krishnana Leele"	R. N. Jayagopal	Anuradha Paudwal, Ananth Nag, Shivarajkumar
6.	"Kachaguli Huduga"	K. Kalyan	Rajesh Krishnan

== Reception ==
Indiainfo wrote "Producer Rockline Venkatesh has fumbled by choosing a poor story line for the film, a remake of the Tamil film Gokulathil Seethai. Director Rajendra Babu failed to live up to the expectations of the audience. Moreover, Shivrajkumar fans are not happy to see their hero addicted to wine and women". The film failed at the box-office. Rajendra Babu admitted he understood the flaws of this film and considered it as black mark in his career.
