= Yaare Neenu Cheluve =

- VCD cover
- Directed by: D. Rajendra Babu
- Written by: S V Prasad (Dialogue)
- Screenplay by: Agathiyan
- Story by: Agathiyan
- Based on: Kadhal Kottai (Tamil)
- Produced by: Rockline Venkatesh
- Starring: Ravichandran; Sangita; Heera Rajagopal
- Cinematography: D. V. Rajaram
- Edited by: Shyam Yadav
- Music by: Hamsalekha
- Production company: Rockline Studios
- Release date: 22 April 1998
- Running time: 140 minutes
- Country: India
- Language: Kannada

Yaare Neenu Cheluve (transl. Who Are You, Beauty?) is a 1998 Indian Kannada-language romantic drama film directed by D. Rajendra Babu and produced by Rockline Venkatesh. The film stars Ravichandran, Sangita and Heera Rajagopal in the lead roles. Vishnuvardhan, Ramesh Aravind, Jaggesh and Prakash Raj are seen in special appearances.

The film was a remake of the 1996 Tamil film Kadhal Kottai. Heera reprised her role from the original. The film released in 1998 to generally positive reviews from critics and was a success. The songs composed by Hamsalekha were received well and stayed at the top of the charts for many weeks. Hamsalekha won the Best Music Director award at the 1998 Filmfare Awards South.

== Plot ==
Kamali (Sangita), a graduate, lives with her sister, Malliga (Jyothi) and brother-in-law Shekar (Prakash Raj) in Kuduremukha, and is searching for a job. While visiting Bangalore, her purse is stolen and she fears she has lost her academic certificates. Surya (Ravichandran) an orphaned, carefree man who works in Jaipur, finds the purse and sends it back to her. A love story develops between them through letters and phone calls. They agree that they love each other without meeting; she sews and sends him a gift pack containing a rose-embroidered woollen sweater for him to wear when they meet for real.

Surya soon shifts to Bangalore for work and stays with Shivu (Jaggesh). Kamali too comes to Bangalore to find a job and stays with her friend Mary (Tara). Dayana (Heera Rajagopal), Surya's boss, is immediately smitten by him, but her repeated attempts at gaining his love and affections fail as he is staunch about his love for Kamali. In the meantime, Surya and Kamali run into each other without knowing who they really are, resulting in some misunderstandings.

Refusing a job offer which would move her to Singapore, making it difficult for her to find Surya, Kamali moves back to her hometown in despair. Unable to withstand the advances of Dayana, Surya quits his job and gets sheltered by Vishnu (Vishnuvardhan), who arranges an autorickshaw for him to drive and make a living.

Ramesh (Ramesh Aravind), a wealthy businessman expresses his interest to marry Kamali, but Kamali refuses. When she meets Shivu she shares her love for Surya and wants to go back and look for him one last time. Upon arriving in Bangalore, which is experiencing severe monsoons, Kamali finds out that Mary and other hostel mates are not in town. Boarding Surya's autorickshaw, without knowing that it is him, she searches for him desperately. At the end of the day, both of them get refreshed at his place, where he dons the sweater gifted by her, covering it with his uniform.

As Kamali plans to head home, depressed, Surya helps her to board the Davanagere Express. As the train departs, when Surya removes his shirt Kamali notices the sweater. The pair finally unite, as Vishnu and Mary look on and rejoice.

== Cast ==
- Ravichandran as Surya
- Sangita as Kamali
- Heera as Diana
- Tara as Mary
- Doddanna
- Sadhu Kokila
- Prakash Raj as Shekar, Kamli's Brother-in-law
- R. G. Vijayasarathy as train passenger
- Ramji as train passenger

=== Special appearances ===
- Vishnuvardhan as Vishnu
- Ramesh Aravind as Ramesh
- Jaggesh as Shivu

== Soundtrack ==
The music of the film was composed and lyrics written by Hamsalekha.

Yaare Neenu Cheluve

Soundtrack album by Hamsalekha
- Released: 1998
- Genre: Feature film soundtrack
- Label: Manoranjan Audio

Hamsalekha chronology
Andaman (1998)	Yaare Neenu Cheluve (1998)	Dayadi (1998)

No.	Title	Singer(s)	Length
1.	"Bulbulki Gilgilki"	S. P. Balasubrahmanyam, Shankar Shanbag	4:55
2.	"Chinte Yaake Maaduteeya"	S. P. Balasubrahmanyam	5:01
3.	"Priya Please Love Me"	S. P. Balasubrahmanyam, K. S. Chithra	5:02
4.	"Chakotha Chakotha"	Suresh Peters, B. Jayashree	4:56
5.	"Dayaana Dayaana"	Srinivas, Anuradha Sriram	4:46
6.	"Kushalave Kshemave"	Srinivas, Anuradha Sriram	4:47

== Reception ==
The Hindu wrote "Multiple starrers are almost unknown to Kannada cinema and the credit for introducing a galaxy of mega stars goes to Rockline Productions whose "Yaare Neenu Cheluve" has formidable names such as Vishnuvardhan, Ravichandran, Ramesh. Jaggesh and Prakash Rai, making it perhaps the first such star-studded venture. But the film's merit-worthiness stops here, the acting prowess of its stars notwithstanding. For, it is a straight remake of the Tamil hit "Kaadal Kottai" So, it comes a cipher where creativity and originality are concerned although Rajendra Babu can be credited as the captain for a film which is technically and musically superior." In contrast, Deccan Herald wrote "The story just falls flat on its face and fails to live up to even half the expectations of its Tamil original."

== Awards ==
- 1998 - Filmfare Best Music Director - Hamsalekha
