= Sridevika =

Indian actress

- Born: Sreedevi Panicker; 6 May 1984 (age 41); Palakkad, Kerala, India
- Education: Master of Business Administration
- Occupations: Actor; Director
- Years active: 2004–present
- Spouse: Rohit Ramachandran (m. 2010)
- Children: 1

Sridevika is an Indian actress who has appeared in Tamil, Telugu, Malayalam and Kannada film industries.

== Early days ==
Sridevika was born on 6 May 1984 in Palakkad, Kerala. She married Rohit Ramachandran, an airline pilot, in March 2010.

Her entrance in Tamil films by pairing opposite Jai Akash in Agathiyan's Ramakrishna (2004) and then opposite Ramana in Anda Naal Nyabagam (2005). She subsequently went on to appear in Telugu films like Rajababu, Malayalam films such as Avan Chandiyude Makan (2007), Parthan Kanda Paralokam (2008) and Manjadikuru (2012), and Kannada films including My Autograph (2006) opposite Sudeep. She has also directed a Malayalam web series called Random Wekaram.

== Filmography ==
Films

Year	Film	Role	Language	Notes
2003	Meerayude Dukhavum Muthuvinte Swapnavum	Rajendran's sister	Malayalam	
2004	Kerala House Udan Vilpanakku	Damayanti	Malayalam	
2004	Ramakrishna	Pooncholai	Tamil	
2005	Anda Naal Nyabagam		Tamil	
2005	Anbe Vaa	Priya	Tamil	
2006	Rajababu	Anjali	Telugu	
2006	Red Salute	Annie Joseph Thomas	Malayalam	
2006	My Autograph	Lathika	Kannada	
2006	Neelakanta	Ganga	Kannada	
2007	Santha	Sandhya	Kannada	
2007	Kshana Kshana	Gayathri	Kannada	
2007	Avan Chandiyude Makan	Shobha	Malayalam	
2008	Parthan Kanda Paralokam	Sathyabhama	Malayalam	
2008	Chempada	Meenakshi	Malayalam	
2009	Gnabagangal	Meera	Tamil	
2009	Mayamalika	Maya	Malayalam	
2012	Manjadikuru	Latha	Malayalam	
2012	Sivamayam	-	Tamil	
2017 -2019	Random Wekaram	Director	Malayalam	Webseries
2018	Oru Kuprasidha Payyan	Anuradha Sreedhar	Malayalam	
