= R. Balu =

Indian director, screenwriter (active 1997–2003)

- Born: Kadayam, Tenkasi
- Occupation: Film director Screen writer
- Years active: 1997 - 2003

R. Balu is an Indian film director and screenwriter who has worked on Tamil films. He is the student of Thiruvalluvar college Papanasam He made his debut with the 1997 romantic drama film, Kaalamellam Kadhal Vaazhga starring Murali and Kausalya.

== Career ==
Following the release of director Agathiyan's Kadhal Kottai (1996), aspiring director Balu claimed that Agathiyan had stolen the story of the film from his half-complete venture Un Ninaivaaga. To appease Balu, producer Sivasakthi Pandian offered him the chance to make a film for his production studio. Balu subsequently made his directorial debut with the romantic film Kaalamellam Kadhal Vaazhga (1997), starring Murali and newcomer Kausalya and won critical acclaim for his first venture. A reviewer from Indolink.com stated that "overall, if it is a long time since you saw a movie with good comedy, above average music and crystal clear photography, here is one for you." Balu immediately signed up to work on a film titled Semma and then another titled Kadhal Prathanai with Vignesh and Shalini starring, but neither film developed beyond pre-production. The success of his first film prompted the makers, actors and director to team up again the following year for a venture titled Unnudan (1998). However, the film had a low key release compared to the team's previous venture and received average reviews from critics. In 1998, he also began scripting a Hindi film titled New Year for producer Ramanathan, though the venture did not materialise after the production team could not bring in then-debutant Abhishek Bachchan, Kajol or Manisha Koirala.

His next film was Anbe Un Vasam (2003), featuring newcomers Ashwin and Rathi Arumugam, had a low-key release and failed to match the success of his previous films. The film was shot across India and Mauritius, and revolved around a campus-based love story. In 2004, he launched a new film featuring newcomers titled Passport, revealing that it would depict the hardship that local people faced in trying to get as passport. However, the film failed to materialise beyond early production and did not eventually release.

Balu has since worked as a lecturer giving classes on visual communications, while continuing to work on potential film projects. In 2007, he was working on a film titled Dating with Monica in the leading role, though the film remains unreleased. He was working on another project titled Ithanai Naalai Engirundhai featuring Ananda Kannan, Manochitra and Vivek during 2010, though the film is yet to have a theatrical release.

== Filmography ==
Year	Film	Notes
1997	Kaalamellam Kadhal Vaazhga	
1998	Unnudan	
2003	Anbe Un Vasam	
