= Kaalamellam Kadhal Vaazhga =

- Poster
- Directed by: R. Balu
- Written by: R. Balu
- Produced by: Sivasakthi Pandian
- Starring: Murali; Kausalya
- Cinematography: Thangar Bachan
- Edited by: B. Lenin; V. T. Vijayan
- Music by: Deva
- Production company: Sivasakthi Movie Makers
- Release date: 12 February 1997
- Running time: 142 minutes
- Country: India
- Language: Tamil

Kaalamellam Kadhal Vaazhga (transl. Long live love) is a 1997 Indian Tamil-language romantic drama film directed by R. Balu in his debut and produced by Sivasakthi Movie Makers. The film stars Murali alongside Kausalya, in her Tamil debut role, while Gemini Ganesan, Manivannan, Charle, Vivek, and Karan play supporting roles. This film completed 200 days at the box office. It was remade in Kannada as Kushalave Kshemave (2003).

== Plot ==
Jeeva is a college student and singer from a lower-middle-class background with various responsibilities who impresses the wealthy college student Kausalya with his musical skills. Kausalya, a music enthusiast who frequently calls to compliment singers, also calls Jeeva. Her voice over the phone creates a romantic effect on him, leading him to fall in love and desire to meet her.

== Cast ==
- Murali as Jeeva
- Kausalya as Kausalya
- Gemini Ganesan as Kausalya's grandfather
- Manivannan as Nayar
- Charle as Perumal
- Vivek as Haridas
- Karan as Prakash
- R. Sundarrajan as Principal Venkatraman
- Vennira Aadai Moorthy as Vice Principal Narasimhan
- Kovai Sarala as Elizabeth
- Vatsala Rajagopal as Kausalya's grandmother
- Shanmugasundaram as Jeeva's father
- Pandu as Sanjay Kujidabadham
- Rajeev as Psychiatrist
- Nassar as Hariharan
- Ramji as Rama
- P. B. Sreenivas as himself (Special appearance)

== Production ==
Following the release of director Agathiyan's Kadhal Kottai (1996), aspiring director Balu claimed that Agathiyan had stolen the story of the film from his half-complete venture Un Ninaivaaga. To appease Balu, producer Sivasakthi Pandian offered him the chance to make a film for his production studio. The film was named after a song from Kadhal Kottai. Kavitha made her Tamil debut with this film, and Balu gave her the screen name Kausalya.

== Soundtrack ==
The soundtrack was composed by Deva.

Track listing
No.	Title	Lyrics	Singer(s)	Length
1.	"Annanagar Andalu"	Deva	Sabesh
2.	"Baghavanae"	Palani Bharathi	Mano
3.	"Oru Mani Adithal"	Palani Bharathi	Hariharan
4.	"Vennilavae Vennilavae"	Ponniyin Selvan	S. P. Balasubrahmanyam, Swarnalatha
5.	"Babilona"	Palani Bharathi	Krishnaraj
6.	"Putham Pudhu Malargal"	Palani Bharathi	K. S. Chithra

== Reception ==
Ananda Vikatan appreciated Thangar Bachan's cinematography, Kausalya's liveliness and Vivek's comedy. Tharamani of Kalki felt youth, jokes, colour, music, dance, a story with the size of a gooseberry if this is what works today he can makea believable and refreshing film with all this, at least next time director Balu should try and concluded on the other hand, if the same type of romantic films continue to come, we will hate the name of love to the extent that we will shift to the party of "Kaalemellam Kaadhal Ozhiga" (love will disappear forever). The success of Kadhal Kottai and Kalamellam Kadhal Vaazhga, prompted Sivashakthi Pandian to announce another romance film Kaadhale Nimmadhi soon after this film's release.
