= Laththi =

2022 Indian film by A. Vinoth Kumar

- Theatrical release poster
- Directed by: A. Vinoth Kumar
- Written by: A. Vinoth Kumar
- Produced by: Ramana; Nandha Durairaj
- Starring: Vishal; Prabhu; Ramana; Sunaina
- Cinematography: Balasubramaniem; Balakrishna Thota
- Edited by: N. B. Srikanth
- Music by: Yuvan Shankar Raja
- Production company: Rana Productions
- Distributed by: Red Giant Movies
- Release date: 22 December 2022
- Running time: 144 minutes
- Country: India
- Language: Tamil

Laththi (transl. Baton), also known as Laththi Charge (Lathi/Baton Charge), is a 2022 Indian Tamil-language action thriller film directed by A. Vinoth Kumar and produced by Ramana and Nandha Durairaj under Rana Productions. The film, which marks Vinoth's directorial debut, stars Vishal, alongside Ramana, Master Lirish Raghav, Sunaina and Prabhu. The music was composed by Yuvan Shankar Raja, while the cinematography and editing were handled by Balasubramaniem & Balakrishna Thota and N. B. Srikanth.

This is the second collaboration between Vishal and Sunaina after Samar. It was shot extensively across Tamil Nadu, including Thiruvanmiyur and Chennai and the final schedule in Hyderabad.

Laththi was released on 22 December 2022 to mixed reviews from critics.

== Plot ==
Muruganantham is a police constable living with his wife, Kavitha, and ten-year-old son, Rasu, an asthmatic. His asthma flares up when he becomes scared. One day, Muruganantham gets suspended for having tortured an innocent civilian suspected of assaulting a girl named Pavithra, who later dies due to her injuries. Six months later, Muruganantham rescinded his suspension with help from DSP Ranganathan and joined back on duty.

Weeks later, DIG Kamal called Muruganantham to a secluded spot to torture a suspect for harassing his daughter. Kamal took voluntary retirement effective that day and had met the suspect by accident. He had managed to catch him and bring him bound. Muruganantham reluctantly tortures the suspect and later drops him off in a waste yard. It turns out that the suspect is Vellai, the son of an influential mafia kingpin named Sura. Sura had planned to get Vellai married to an ex-minister in the opposition party and make his son an MLA and a minister in the coming elections. Enraged about Vellai's torture, Sura learns about Muruganantham and sends his henchmen to bring him. Muruganantham and Rasu escape from Sura's henchmen, where they get trapped in an under-construction building.

Muruganantham finds a place for Rasu to hide, but it turns out that Rasu is not feeling well and needs his inhaler in his bag near the ground floor of the building. Muruganantham attempts to reach the ground floor, but Vellai and his men capture and beat Muruganantham with a laththi. Muruganantham informs that he knew about Vellai earlier and his involvement in Pavithra's death. Muruganantham also reveals that he purposely brought Sura, Vellai and their henchmen to the building to finish them and secretly brought weapons from the station's weaponry to attack the henchmen.

After the revelation, Muruganantham escapes and sets off machine guns, killing most of the henchmen. Rasu attempts to escape the building, but Vellai captures him. Rasu is buried alive, and Muruganantham desperately comes down and tries to find Rasu. Vellai stabs and injures Muruganantham. After a brief emotional breakdown, worrying over his son's fate, Muruganantham finds Rasu and administers the inhaler. Muruganantham attacks the henchmen with his laththi and kills Sura. He then kills Vellai, thus avenging Pavithra's death. Muruganantham reunites with Rasu and tells him to forget the incident, and they return home.

== Cast ==
- Vishal as Constable Muruganantham
- Prabhu as DIG Kamala Kannan
- Ramana as Vellai
- Master Lirish Raghav as Rasu, Muruganantham's son
- Sunaina as Kavitha, Muruganantham's wife
- Thalaivasal Vijay as DSP Ranganathan
- Munishkanth as Head constable Panneer Selvam
- A. Venkatesh as Inspector Gnanamuthu
- Sunny PN as Sura, Vellai's father
- Vinod Sagar as Kaimari, Sura's henchmen
- Misha Ghoshal as Aishwarya, Kamala Kannan's daughter
- Vinodhini Vaidyanathan as Savithri, Ranganathan's wife
- Raj Kapoor as Party Leader
- Mohan Raman as DIG
- T. Siva as Minister
- Ravikanth as Veeramurthy
- Supergood Subramani as Minister
- M. George as Constable Sam
- Parotta Murugesan as Constable Thangavelu
- Hello Kandasamy as PC Muniyandi

== Production ==
=== Development ===
The film was tentatively titled as Vishal32. On 17 October 2021, the film's official title was unveiled as Laththi Charge, which was chosen as it would work across multiple languages. At the same time, it was reported that the film will have a pan-Indian release (in Tamil, Telugu, Malayalam, Kannada and Hindi) and will be released in the month of September although the release date got postponed.

=== Casting ===
Vishal was once again signed to play the role of a cop after previously appearing in cop roles in films like Veeramae Vaagai Soodum, Ayogya and Paayum Puli and Vedi and Satyam. Sunaina was signed in to play the female lead which marks her second collaboration with Vishal after Samar. The makers announced that Ramana who produced the film was cast as the main antagonist in the film. Veteran actor Prabhu was signed in to play an important role in this film which marks his third collaboration with the lead actor after Aambala and Thaamirabharani.

=== Filming ===
Principal photography of the film began on 29 August 2021. The first schedule is taking place on Thiruvanmiyur and was wrapped up on 14 September 2021. The second schedule taking place in Chennai and wrapped up on 13 December 2021. The third schedule taking place in Hyderabad. During this phase, Vishal was injured while filming an action sequence in early February 2022, with multiple hairline fractures on one of his hands, and he took a break from shooting to heal. After recovering, he returned to shooting in March with increased caution exercised during stunts. On 14 May 2022, the crew would begin the dubbing process for the movie. On 15 July 2022, the film was wrapped completed. The post production works of the film began on 7 December 2022.

== Soundtrack ==
Sam C. S. was earlier chosen as the composer of the film's score and soundtrack. Later, on 4 April 2022, it was reported that he has been replaced by Yuvan Shankar Raja. The audio rights were acquired by U1 Records. The first single "Thotta Load Aage Waiting" was released on 5 October 2022. The second single " Oonjal Manam" was released on 13 November 2022. The third single titled "Veerathukkor Niramundu" was released on 19 December 2022.

Track listing
No.	Title	Lyrics	Singer(s)	Length
1.	"Thotta Load Aage Waiting"	Durai	Yuvan Shankar Raja, MC Vickey	3:35
2.	"Oonjal Manam"	Karthik Netha	Ranjith, Shweta Mohan	3:59
3.	"Veerathukkor Niramundu"	Madhan Karky	Yuvan Shankar Raja, MC Sanna	3:02
Total length:				10:36

== Release ==
=== Theatrical ===
The film was released in theatres on 22 December 2022 coinciding with Christmas. The film was initially planned for release in theatres on 12 August 2022, but got postponed to 15 September 2022 due to multiple injuries of actor Vishal and heavy visual effects for the fight sequences although the release date was again postponed indefinitely. The distribution rights of the film in Tamil Nadu were acquired by Udhayanidhi Stalin under the banner of Red Giant Movies. The Andhra Pradesh and Telangana distribution rights of the film have been bagged by JPR Films.

=== Home media ===
The post-theatrical streaming rights of the film has been sold to Sun NXT, while the satellite rights were sold to Sun TV. The Hindi version of the film was telecast through Star Gold on 12 March 2023.

== Reception ==
Laththi received mixed reviews from critics with praise for Vishal's performance and action sequences, but criticized its screenwriting.

=== Critical response ===
Logesh Balachandran of The Times of India gave 2.5/5 stars and wrote "Laththi gives forceful blows at times, but only a few make us feel the real pain." Janani K of India Today gave 2.5/5 stars and wrote "On the whole, Laththi is a compelling action drama with excellent stunt choreography. The film manages to hold your attention, for the most part."

Thinkal Menon of OTT Play gave 2.5/5 stars and wrote "Laththi has Vishal putting his best foot forward in stunt and emotional sequences, but his hard work required a far more engaging screenplay and character design." Navein Darshan of The New Indian Express gave 2/5 stars and wrote "Though Laththi tries hard to be an edge-of-the-seat thriller, it's not a good sign that you're laughing for most of it."

Vishal Menon of Film Companion wrote "Laththi is an assembly line of plot points that are either a hit or a miss makes the film ridiculously incoherent." Praveen Sudevan of The Hindu wrote "Despite a promising first half, Vinoth Kumar’s directorial debut falters post-intermission and becomes a generic action film."
