= Ramakrishna (2004 Tamil film) =

- Poster
- Directed by: Agathiyan
- Written by: Agathiyan
- Produced by: Sivasakthi Pandian
- Starring: Jai Akash; Sridevika
- Cinematography: Rajesh Yadav
- Edited by: Lancy-Mohan
- Music by: Deva
- Production company: Sivasakthi Movie Makers
- Release date: 26 December 2004
- Country: India
- Language: Tamil

Ramakrishna is a 2004 Indian Tamil-language drama film directed by Agathiyan and produced by Sivasakthi Movie Makers. The film stars Jai Akash, Sridevika, along with Vijay Kumar, Vani and others. Deva scored the soundtrack and background music.

== Cast ==
- Jai Akash as Ramakrishna
- Sridevika as Pooncholai
- Vani as Pavalakodi
- Vijayakumar as the village chief
- Saranya Ponvannan as Ramakrishna's mother
- Jaguar Thangam as Pooncholai's uncle
- Charle as Pavalakodi's brother
- Paravai Muniyamma
- Manochitra
- Sabitha Anand
- Vaishali
- Halwa Vasu
- Scissor Manohar
- Balu Anand
- Muthukaalai
- Ganeshkar

== Production ==
Ramakrishna marked the third collaboration between Agathiyan and Sivasakthi Pandian. The makers initially approached Nandaa to play the lead role but he turned down the offer. The climax fight sequence was shot at a village Aalankulam near Tenkasi for ten days while a song was shot at Courtallam.

== Soundtrack ==
The soundtracks and background score are composed by Deva and lyrics written by Agathiyan.

Song	Singers	Length
Thathi Thavidum	Harish Raghavendra	05:09
Viruppamillaiya	Sadhana Sargam	06:09
Enakku Aambalaina	Anuradha Sriram, Udit Narayan	05:17
Thilla Dangu	Deva	05:03
KokkuchiKokku	Sadhana Sargam, Karthik	05:59
Peiyummazhiyamma	Deva, Sadhana Sargam, Karthik, Paravai Muniyamma, Sabesh, Jayalakshmi	07:17

== Release and reception ==
The release of the film was delayed after the failure of Sivasakthi Pandian's earlier film Kadal Pookkal.

A critic from Sify opined that "Now after a break, he [Agathiyan] is back with Ramakrishna with an all new star cast set against a village milieu which just does not live up to his earlier works". Malini Mannath of Chennai Online wrote "The presentation is fairly neat, urban life depicted well and the rural ambience picturised in all its simplicity. The director in the opening song in the village itself depicts in a capsule the entire culture, tradition and the folk arts of rural life. The pace does get a bit slow at times, the song numbers towards the latter part not helping matters. One feels even the treatment looks a bit out-dated". Cinesouth called it a disappointment.
