= Sankharavam (2004 film) =

- Directed by: A. Mohana Gandhi
- Written by: Marudhuri Raja (dialogues)
- Screenplay by: A. Mohana Gandhi
- Story by: A. Mohana Gandhi
- Produced by: B Bhuvaneswara Reddy
- Starring: Anant Nag; Sarath Babu; Srinadh; Rajiv Kanakala
- Edited by: Gowtham Raju
- Music by: Vandemataram Srinivas
- Production company: Padmalaya Studios
- Distributed by: Meghana Movies Makers
- Release date: 4 April 2004
- Country: India
- Language: Telugu

Sankharavam is a 2004 Indian Telugu film directed by A. Mohana Gandhi and starring Anant Nag, Sarath Babu, Srinath and Rajiv Kanakala.

== Plot ==
Chief Minister and Opposition minister unite to identify and solve peoples problems

== Cast ==
- Anant Nag as Chandra Rayudu
- Sarath Babu as Rajendra Reddy
- Srinath
- Rajiv Kanakala
- Krishna Bhagawan
- Amrutha
- AVS
- Siva Krishna
- Jaya Prakash Reddy
- Raghunatha Reddy
- Ahuti Prasad
- Surya

== Soundtrack ==
The music was composed by Vandemataram Srinivas.
