= Parthan Kanda Paralokam =

2008 movie

- DVD cover
- Directed by: Anil
- Written by: K. B. Raju (Story); Rajan Kiriyath (Screenplay)
- Produced by: K. B. Madhu
- Starring: Jayaram; Mukesh; Kalabhavan Mani; Jagathy Sreekumar; Sridevika
- Cinematography: Anandakuttan
- Edited by: P. C. Mohanan
- Music by: Songs: M. Jayachandran; Score: C. Rajamani
- Production company: Screen Entertainment Company
- Release date: 3 October 2008
- Running time: 139 minutes
- Country: India
- Language: Malayalam

Parthan Kanda Paralokam (transl. The heaven that Parthan saw) is a 2008 Indian Malayalam-language fantasy comedy drama film directed by Anil, starring Jayaram, Mukesh, Kalabhavan Mani and Sridevika in the lead roles. The film also features Jagathy Sreekumar, Kottayam Nazeer and Salim Kumar in supportive roles. Kalabhavan Mani plays the villain role.

== Plot ==
Parthasarathy, popularly called Parthan, lives in Krishnapuram village. Parthan, a staunch believer of Lord Krishna, is constantly clashing with his uncle Falgunan Thampy, who is the Panchayath President. Falgunan is least bothered about the welfare of the people; rather, he is more keen in grabbing the assets of the village temple, which has been locked for many years by the court over a dispute of ownership. Falgunan, also the secretary of temple's ruling committee, believes that the temple belongs to his family, while Parthan and his friends Sulaiman and Poonkodi argue that the temple belongs to the village.

Into this situation comes Falgunan's daughter Sathyabhama, an advocate, who pretends to be in love with Parthan. In fact, her intention is to help her father on the temple dispute in the court. As a result, Parthan, who begins an agitation, is sentenced to one month's imprisonment for contempt of court.

After Parthan is released from jail, he and some of his friends have a party, which turns tragic when many of them die due to poisoning from the alcohol. However Parthan, who was declared dead, miraculously survives, though a bit eccentric. This incident, combined with him saving a dying man with a quack remedy, convinces Parthan to be a godman. But Falgunan once again opposes him, and even sends goons to beat him up. Just when it seems that Parthan will lose, an invisible force protects Parthan, before a mysterious man, who is actually Lord Krishna in a human form, saves him.

The next day Parthan encounters that same mysterious man, who claims that he is Madhavan, Parthan's friend from college. Despite Parthan not being able to recognize him, Madhavan soon becomes a part of Parthan's life and friend circle. When Falgunan once again tries to trap Parthan in a case involving the theft of an idol from the temple, Madhavan saves him with his tricks. Later, Madhavan has Parthan contest against Falgunan in the upcoming Panchayat elections, even when Sathyabhama decides to compete in place of her father. Slowly but steadily, Madhavan guides Parthan into solving the various problems in his life, while dropping subtle hints about his divinity.

Meanwhile Falgunan arranges Sathyabhama's wedding with Veerabhadran, an effeminate man who she despises. When Veerabhadran kidnaps Sathyabhama with ill intention, Parthan rescues her with Madhavan's help, earning her love in the process.

With Parthan's victory in the election almost confirmed, he and Sathyabhama decide to get married. However Falgunan manages to get Parthan and Madhavan arrested for theft of the temple idol, much to everyone's shock. Madhavan however explains to Parthan that whatever is happening is supposed to happen for a good reason.

It is revealed that Poonkodi had replaced the original idol for a fake one in order to help Parthan. She hands it over to the MLA Prabhakaran, an ally of Falgunan who is actually in cahoots with Veerabhadran. Veerabhadran reveals himself to be an insurgent named Musafir, who aims to create a communal rift in the village by stealing the original idol and replacing it with a fake on the reopening of the temple. Falgunan, who manages to overhear everything, saves Poongodi from being killed by Musafir's men, and manages to inform Parthan. Parthan fights Musafir atop a waterfall and causes him to fall to his death, but unfortunately the idol is also lost in the process. When Parthan disheartenedly returns to the temple, Falgunan reveals that Madhavan brought the real idol just in time. Parthan then sees Madhavan among the crowd, but he disappears before Parthan can find him.

With all his problems solved, Parthan and Sathyabhama get married. But on their wedding night Parthan hears Madhavan's voice. Believing that he is hiding under their bed, like he did before, Parthan checks, only to find a peacock feather, similar to the one he saw in a vision, instead. Parthan finally realizes that Madhavan was actually Lord Krishna, who came to help him, and places the feather near a lit lamp, happily watching his friends, now joined by a reformed Falgunan, dancing and singing, alongside Sathyabhama.

== Cast ==
- Jayaram as Parthasarathy (Parthan)
- Mukesh as Madhavan (Lord Krishna), Parthan's friend
- Kalabhavan Mani as Veerabhadran (Musafir), The main antagonist
- Sridevika as Sathyabhama, Parthan's love interest and turned wife
- Jagathy Sreekumar as Falgunan Thambi,Parthan's uncle and Sathyabhama's father
- Salim Kumar as Karunan, Falgunan Thambi's associate
- Kottayam Nazeer as Sulaiman, Parthan's friend
- Salu Kuttanadu as Mortuary Attendant
- Kozhikode Narayanan Nair as Poovanthottathu Chandran
- Kailash as Kunjikhader
- Chali Pala as SI Idiyan Rasheed
- Sona Heiden as Poonkodi, Parthan's friend
- Shobha Mohan as Devayani, Parthan's Mother
- E. A. Rajendran as MLA Yakkara Prabhakaran
- Krishna Praba
- Murali Mohan as Parthan's father

== Soundtrack ==
Parthan Kanda Paralokam

Soundtrack album by M. Jayachandran
- Released: 2008
- Recorded: Satyam Audios
- Genre: World Music
- Label: Satyam Audios
- Producer: Screen Cine Entertainments

Parthan Kanda Paralokam has music composed by M. Jayachandran. The lyrics are by renowned poet Kaithapram Damodaran Namboothiri. The film has three songs. The singers are Unni Menon, Jassie Gift, Pradeep, Deepak and Ganga. The song 𝘎𝘰𝘬𝘶𝘭𝘢 𝘗𝘢𝘢𝘭𝘢 went on to gain a cult following in the following years.

Track #	Song	Singer(s)
1	"Vennila"	Unni Menon, Ganga
2	"Gokula Paala"	Jassie Gift
3	"Padavalinu"	Pradeep, Deepak

== Reception ==
The film could not rise to the expectations and was declared a flop at the box-office. Rediff.com made mostly negative remarks and gave the film a rating of 1.5 stars out of 5. Sify also called the film a "colossal bore".
