= Samar (2013 film) =

2013 Indian Tamil film by Thiru

- Theatrical release poster
- Directed by: Thiru
- Written by: Thiru and S. Ramakrishnan (Dialogue)
- Screenplay by: Thiru
- Story by: Thiru
- Produced by: Rudrapati Ramana Rao; T. Ramesh
- Starring: Vishal; Trisha; Sunaina
- Cinematography: Richard Nathan
- Edited by: Ruben
- Music by: Songs: Yuvan Shankar Raja; Score: Dharan Kumar
- Production company: Jaya Balaji Real Media
- Release date: 13 January 2013
- Running time: 137 minutes
- Country: India
- Language: Tamil

Samar (transl. War) is a 2013 Indian Tamil-language mystery action thriller film written and directed by Thiru. It stars Vishal, Trisha and Sunaina, while Manoj Bajpayee, J. D. Chakravarthy, Jayaprakash, Sampath Raj, and John Vijay, play supporting roles. Richard M. Nathan handled the cinematography, while the film's soundtrack and score were composed by Yuvan Shankar Raja and Dharan Kumar, respectively. The story revolves around a trekking guide who goes to Bangkok to meet his girlfriend and witnesses a series of puzzling incidents there. After several delays, the film was released on 13 January 2013.

== Plot ==
Sakthi (also known as Shankar, Vishal Krishna) is a forest ranger in India. His girlfriend Rupa breaks up with him and moves to Bangkok, Thailand. Three months later, Shankar receives a letter from Rupa stating that she still cannot forget him and asking him to meet her in Bangkok and reconcile. Shankar travels to Bangkok. At the airport, he befriends Maya (Trisha Krishnan), a woman who works there.

After arriving in Bangkok, Shankar waits for Rupa at the location mentioned in the letter, but she never shows up. After several days of waiting, he gives up and decides to spend some time sightseeing before returning to India.

One day, Shankar is attacked by a group of gunmen but is rescued by another group of men, who claim that he is their boss and that they are his bodyguards led by his secretary, Madhu. Confused, Shankar insists that he is merely a middle-class man from India and has neither a secretary nor bodyguards. However, after seeing a magazine featuring his photograph on the cover identifying him as a wealthy business tycoon also named Shankar, he assumes that the situation is a case of mistaken identity.

Shankar attempts to prove his identity to Madhu by showing his passport, only to discover that it is a Thai passport belonging to the tycoon Shankar. He also finds the tycoon's wallet in his pocket, containing several premium bank cards. Suspecting that he is the victim of a conspiracy, Shankar struggles to understand what is happening. Over the next few days, he is forced to live the life of the tycoon Shankar arranged by Madhu, including staying in a luxurious hotel suite and attending high-profile business meetings.

Shankar later contacts Maya for help, and the two visit a police station to file a complaint. However, even the police officers believe that he is the tycoon Shankar and treat him like a celebrity. They then visit a bank to confirm his identity. To their surprise, Shankar not only has millions of dollars in his bank account, but his signature also matches that of the tycoon, allowing him access to the account. This further convinces Shankar that he has been deliberately trapped.

Back at the hotel, an employee secretly slips him a note reading, "You are in a trap. Get out soon." Convinced that his suspicions are true, Shankar decides to return to India without uncovering the truth behind the conspiracy.

As Shankar prepares to leave, Maya is attacked by a group of men. He intervenes and saves her, after which he changes his mind about leaving, believing that Maya will continue to be targeted if he escapes alone. When Shankar returns to the hotel, he discovers that the entire setup — including the people and locations connected to the tycoon identity — has vanished. He assumes that those behind the conspiracy have abandoned the operation after believing he had escaped.

Later, Shankar encounters Madhu on the street and discovers that he is actually a pimp. Before Madhu can reveal any useful information, he is shot dead by unknown assailants. Shankar then meets Rupa again, but she denies sending him the letter and refuses to reconcile with him. Realizing that the conspiracy is far more dangerous than he initially believed, Shankar once again decides to return to India despite Maya confessing her love for him. However, Maya is kidnapped by the same group of men before he can leave, forcing Shankar to rescue her again.

It is eventually revealed that the conspiracy was orchestrated by businessmen Rajesh Arunasalam (Manoj Bajpayee) and John Frederick (J. D. Chakravarthy). Bored with ordinary gambling, the two wealthy addicts have turned to "human gambling", in which they manipulate the lives of unsuspecting victims and bet on the outcomes, such as whether the victim will become insane or commit suicide.

Maya is revealed to be one of the participants in the game. Their scheme involving Shankar was designed to make him fall in love with Maya before ultimately having his heart broken by her. Unknown to Maya, Rajesh and Frederick had additionally placed a bet on whether Shankar would kill her after discovering the truth.

As Shankar grows closer to Maya, Rajesh and Frederick introduce another participant into the game: Rohit, a man claiming to be Maya's long-lost boyfriend. Feeling betrayed, Shankar accidentally kills Maya, resulting in Frederick winning the bet.

After the game concludes, Rajesh and Frederick host a celebratory party. While driving home afterward, they are shocked to see Maya — supposedly dead — standing in the middle of the road. Terrified, Frederick sharply turns the steering wheel, causing a car accident.

The two later awaken inside an unfamiliar house, where they are confronted by Shankar and a very-much-alive Maya. It is revealed that after Madhu was killed and Maya became the conspirators' next target, several participants in the game began fearing for their own safety and secretly exposed the truth to Shankar. Shankar subsequently pretended to remain trapped while turning the conspirators' own scheme against them. The defecting players ultimately kill Rajesh and Frederick.

== Cast ==
- Vishal as Sakthi
- Trisha as Maya
- Sunaina as Roopa
- Manoj Bajpayee as Rajesh Arunasalam
  - Saran Shakthi as young Rajesh
- J. D. Chakravarthy as John Frederick
- Jayaprakash as Joseph Kuriyan
- Sampath Raj as Muthumaran
- John Vijay as Manohar
- Sriman as Jayaraj
- Narayan as Rohit, Maya's boyfriend
- Azhagam Perumal as Sakthi's father
- Rajendran as Tree Cutter
- Uma Padmanabhan
- Munnar Ramesh
- Sandra Amy
- Chevvalai Rasu
- Scarlett Mellish Wilson as an item girl in "Rajaavin Thoattathil"

== Production ==
=== Development ===
In mid-August 2011, Vishal confirmed that his next project after Vedi would be a film to be directed by Thiru, with whom he had collaborated in Theeradha Vilaiyattu Pillai before. The film was titled Samaran, and was reported to be an action adventure film, with Vishal playing a "forest trekker". The film's title was changed to Samar in April 2012. At the audio release function, Vishal revealed that the film was written for his friend, actor Arya, but that he wanted to enact the lead role after listening to its narration. The first look of the film was unveiled by Thiru on 1 May 2012 via Twitter.

=== Casting ===
Trisha, who had previously declined five of Vishal's films – Thaamirabharani, Sathyam, Thoranai, Theeradha Vilayattu Pillai and Vedi - was signed as the lead actress of Samar. It was initially reported that retired actor Arvind Swamy had agreed to play a negative character, making a comeback to acting. Arvind Swamy denied the reports, while Thiru clarified that Arvind Samy was considered but never approached, adding that it was not a negative character either. Sunaina accept to star in the film after initial hesitancy. Prakash Raj originally agreed to act in the film, but as filming became delayed by a month, he opted out of the project and was subsequently replaced by Hindi actor Manoj Bajpai, making his Tamil film debut, while J. D. Chakravarthy, whom Bajpai acted with in the Hindi film Satya (1998), was recruited to play another pivotal role as Thiru wanted to reunite the Satya actors.

=== Filming ===
The director stated that Samar would be filmed on location in the forests of Chalakudy, Kerala. Most of the scenes from the first schedule were shot in Ooty and featured only Vishal and Sunaina. Several stunt scenes were shot in Bangkok with the help of Chinese stuntman Nung, which Vishal performed without using any safety ropes. The song "Poikaal Kuthirai", picturised on Vishal, was shot for over five days in almost 18 locations in Bangkok. In October 2012, the crew left for Malaysia to shoot the last song on Vishal and Trisha.

In August 2012, a producer named Vijay brought an interim injunction over the usage of the title Samar, claiming that he had registered the same a year ago for his upcoming film. Thiru confirmed by October 2012 that the title issue had been solved and that the film's title remains unchanged.

== Music ==
Samar

Soundtrack album by Yuvan Shankar Raja
- Released: 4 December 2012
- Genre: Feature film soundtrack
- Length: 24:11
- Language: Tamil
- Label: Sony Music
- Producer: Yuvan Shankar Raja

Yuvan Shankar Raja chronology
Moondru Per Moondru Kadhal (2012)	Samar (2012)	Kedi Billa Killadi Ranga (2013)

The soundtrack was composed by Yuvan Shankar Raja, continuing his association with Thiru. It was released on 4 December 2012, with Agathiyan, Thiru's father-in-law, being present at the event. The background score was composed by Dharan Kumar.

Pramodh of Musicperk rated the album 6.5/10, quoting "This album is a treat for Yuvan fans". Karthik of Milliblog wrote, "Samar is proof that Yuvan can doze off while composing".

Track listing
No.	Title	Lyrics	Singer(s)	Length
1.	"Oru Kannil Vaegam"	Na. Muthukumar	K. G. Ranjith, Naveen Madhav, Suchitra	4:54
2.	"Azhagho Azhaghu"	Na. Muthukumar	Naresh Iyer	4:50
3.	"Poikkaal Kuthirai"	Na. Muthukumar	Yuvan Shankar Raja	5:47
4.	"Rajaavin Thoattathil"	Na. Muthukumar	K. G. Ranjith, Rita	3:48
5.	"Vellai Maiyil"	Kabilan	Udit Narayan, Shweta Mohan	4:52
Total length:				24:11

== Release ==
Samar was supposed to release for the Christmas weekend on 21 December 2012. It was later pushed to 28 December since it had not yet been cleared by the Central Board of Film Certification (CBFC). Due to "severe" financial issues, the film was postponed to mid-January 2013, to release during the week of Pongal. It was cleared by the CBFC on 22 December, and released on 13 January 2013 in nearly 200 screens in Tamil Nadu. The rights for the Telugu dubbed version were bought by Five Colours. Post-release, Thiru lashed out at a major production house, alleging that it tried to stall the release of Samar for Pongal.

== Reception ==
=== Box office ===
According to Box Office Mojo, the film grossed $11,132 at the UK box office.

=== Critical response ===
Sify wrote, "a suspense thriller that is intelligently structured, Vishal's Thiru directed Samar is an all-new experience for Tamil commercial cinema viewers", with the reviewer going on to add that it was not "what one would rate as great cinema but we assure it has enough zing, visual and thrills to keep you in your seats for its runtime of a little over two hours". Vivek Ramz from In.com rated it 3 out of 5 and stated, "Samar has an interesting storyline, but is somewhat let down in its treatment. Still, it's watchable, especially for those who love suspense and thrills". M. Suganth from The Times of India gave the film 3.5 stars out of 5 and claimed, Samar is an engaging film that is quite a different attempt for Tamil cinema (Hollywood routinely comes up with such thrillers) and Thiru deserves a pat for confidently exploring this slightly tricky genre and managing to succeed in it. Rediff.com's Pavithra Srinivasan gave it 3 out of 5 and cited that it "manages to wring out a tale that's entertaining and snappy, despite its flaws", further adding that "it is slick, makes you get involved with the characters, and doesn't let you pause until almost the end", and calling it an "ideal festival fare". Deccan Chronicle stated that Samar was a "neat thriller with an interesting plot and a good script".
