= Thiru (director) =

Indian director, screenwriter (born 1979)

- Born: Thiru Krishnamoorthy; 6 July 1979 (age 47); Gudiyatham, Tamil Nadu, India
- Occupations: Director; screenwriter
- Years active: 2010 – present
- Spouse: Kani Thiru
- Children: 2
- Relatives: Agathiyan (father-in-law); Vijayalakshmi (sister-in-law); Niranjani Ahathian(sister-in-law)

Thiru Krishnamoorthy (born 6 July 1979) is an Indian film director and screenwriter who works in Tamil cinema. He has directed films such as Theeradha Vilaiyattu Pillai (2010), Samar (2013) and Naan Sigappu Manithan (2014).

== Career ==
After assisting A. Rajasekhar in Sathyam (2008), Thiru made his directorial debut with Theeradha Vilaiyattu Pillai (2010), starring Vishal alongside three lead actresses. The film received mixed reviews and became a hit at the box office. After that Thiru again collaborated with Vishal in two films Samar (2013) and Naan Sigappu Manithan (2014). The former dealt with protagonist who unknowingly involved in a dangerous game and the latter dealt with hero suffering from narcolepsy.

In late 2015, Thiru announced a project titled Garuda featuring Vikram and Kajal Aggarwal in the lead roles. The film was set to be produced by Silverline Film Factory and have music composer Girinandh, but the collaboration was later called off.

== Personal life ==
He married Kani Thiru, daughter of film director Agathiyan. The couple have two daughters, Diya and Tashmai.

== Filmography ==
=== Films ===
Year	Title	Language
2010	Theeradha Vilaiyattu Pillai	Tamil
2013	Samar	Tamil
2014	Naan Sigappu Manithan	Tamil
2018	Mr. Chandramouli	Tamil
2019	Chanakya	Telugu
TBA	Untitled film with Shanmuga Pandian	Tamil

=== Web series ===
- Jhansi (2022–2023) (Telugu, Disney+ Hotstar)
