= Rajababu (film) =

2006 Indian Telugu film by Muppalaneni Siva

- Theatrical release poster
- Directed by: Muppalaneni Siva
- Written by: Satish Vegesna (dialogues)
- Screenplay by: Muppalaneni Siva
- Produced by: Paruchuri Sivarama Prasad
- Starring: Rajasekhar; Sridevika
- Cinematography: Jawahar Reddy
- Edited by: Nandamuri Hari
- Music by: S. A. Rajkumar
- Production company: United Movies
- Release date: 24 February 2006
- Country: India
- Language: Telugu

Rajababu is a 2006 Indian Telugu-language family drama film directed by Muppalaneni Siva. A remake of the 2003 Malayalam film Balettan, the films stars Rajasekhar and Sridevika in her Telugu debut.

== Plot ==
The film follows Rajababu who learns, after his father's death, that he had another wife and children with her. The problems that ensue after Rajababu meets his father's second family form the rest of the story.

== Cast ==
- Rajasekhar as Ramaraju a.k.a. Rajababu
- Sridevika as Anjali
- Vijayakumar as Dasaradharamayya
- Sharada as Vardanamma, Rajababu's mother
- Prabhu as Ramasamy, Rajababu's father
- Telangana Shakuntala as Shakuntala, Rajababu's grandmother
- K. Viswanath as Raghavayya, Rajababu's grandfather
- Narra Venkateswara Rao as Koteswara Rao
- Siva Reddy as Rajababu's brother
- Brahmanandam as Nandagopal, Rajababu's friend
- Duvvasi Mohan as Duvvasi
- Kovai Sarala as Lakshmi
- Krishna Bhagawan as Girisam
- Goutam Raju as Gautam
- Dharmavarapu Subramanyam as Sumbramanyam
- Kondavalasa Lakshmana Rao as Kondavalsa
- Sudha as Pilli Nirmala Simha
- Riyaz Khan as Venugopal
- Abhinayashree as Vasuki
- Gundu Sudarshan
- Harika

== Production ==
Following his previous films, Rajasekar opted for a remake with this film.

== Soundtrack ==
Music by S. A. Rajkumar, who collaborated with Rajasekar for two other films.

Track listing
| No. | Title | Lyrics | Singer(s) | Length |
|---|---|---|---|---|
| 1. | "Vennela Vennela" | E. S. Murthy | Hariharan, Sujatha Mohan | 4:30 |
| 2. | "Rajadhi Rajandi" | E. S. Murthy | Shankar Mahadevan | 4:48 |
| 3. | "Prema O Toliprema" | Pothula Ravikiran | Udit Narayan, K. S. Chithra | 4:45 |
| 4. | "Nerajana" | Bhuvana Chandra | Udit Narayan, Sujatha Mohan | 5:12 |
| 5. | "Nuvve Maa Rajuvani" | E. S. Murthy | Madhu Balakrishnan | 4:43 |
| Total length: | | | | 23:58 |

== Reception ==
A critic from The Hindu opined that "The film is a family drama though the director fails to elevate the hero's image in this film and the entire narration becomes boring.". A critic from Sify stated that "On the whole, it is a boring affair". A critic from Full Hyderabad said that "Avoid this one at all costs". Jeevi of Idlebrain gave the film a more favourable review and wrote that "On a whole, Rajababu is much better than the films Raja Sekhar dished out in the recent past".

Writing for Zamin Ryot, Griddaluru Gopalrao called the film slow-placed, adding the director dragged the screenplay by adding scenes catering to the actor's image.
