= Meesai Madhavan =

2004 Tamil film

- Directed by: S. Ramu
- Written by: Siddique-Lal
- Produced by: S. V. Thangaraj
- Starring: Ramana; Kutty Radhika; Ilavarasu; S. V. Thangaraj
- Cinematography: Ravishankar
- Edited by: P. C. Mohan
- Music by: Bharani
- Production company: Uvasree Creations
- Release date: 17 December 2004
- Country: India
- Language: Tamil

Meesai Madhavan (transl. Moustache Madhavan) is a 2004 Indian Tamil-language film written and directed by S. Ramu. The film stars debutant Ramana, Kutty Radhika of Iyarkai fame, Ilavarasu and S. V. Thangaraj. The film is produced by S. V. Thangaraj of Uvasree creations, which earlier produced Sundara Travels (2002). The film was a remake of the Malayalam film Kabooliwala (1994).

== Plot ==
The story begins in Kerala. Vignesh is the a three-year-old son of a doctor. He has two elder sisters. On Vignesh's fourth birthday, his father was late for the celebration but gives Vignesh a trumpet, which he likes very much. The same night while they were celebrating, Kabuliwala comes with a child who was suffering from fever to the doctor. The doctor does not treat the child and ask him to take the child to hospital. A call comes at midnight, saying that Kabooli's son is serious. The doctor rushes to the hospital and takes his son with him. Vignesh is very much attached to the music played by Kabuliwala. Kabuliwala's son Madhavan dies in the hospital, and Kabuliwala runs away from the hospital with Vignesh.

After 15 years, the story shifts to Chennai, where we see Kannas and Kadalas who are street boys. They stay with Amminiamma and are in love with her daughters. One of her daughters steals some valuables from the house where she does household work. In order to save them, Kannas and Kadalas go to prison. When they return, they find both are married and move out of the house with sorrow. Madhavan comes in search of Kannas and Kadalas because they went to prison for stealing the trumpet which was at stake. Kannas and Kadalas have buried the trumpet in the ground and now there is a circus tent around it. While trying to take it out, the trumpet is taken by Rani, the daughter of the circus owner Meesaikarar. Madhavan asks for the trumpet, and she refuses to give it. They fight with each other, and in the process, Madhavan tries to prove that Rani has an illicit relation with him. Meesaikarar is furious and he tries to kill Madhavan. But before that, Madhavan tells him that he did all this for his trumpet and has no relation with his daughter. Meesaikarar asks Rani to return the trumpet. Madhavan plays the same music which Kabuliwala used to play. All in the circus tent are shocked to hear it, and it is revealed that Madhavan is Meesaikarar's nephew. All in the circus tent accept him wholeheartedly. Madhavan ignores Rani, and she tries to commit suicide. Madhavan confesses his love for her.

While romancing, Madhavan plays the same music, and the doctor who was passing by hears it and comes with his daughters and sons-in-law. and they forcefully take him. Madhavan tries to leave but is given sedation. One of the sons-in-law is a police officer, and the other is a doctor, and they are able to arrest Meesaikarar, who comes to release Madhavan. The doctor shows the photograph of the dead Madhavan and the newspaper articles reporting the kidnap of Vignesh to the people in the circus tent. Meesaikarar is released under the condition that they would leave the city within 48 hours. Meesaikarar is also furious and says that he will marry off his daughter within 48 hours and his son would curse him for being his father. Kannas and Kadalas come to Madhavan's house, and she stops them. She requests Kannas and Kadalas not to take her son back to the streets. Kannas and Kadalas reveal the love between Madhavan and Rani and also tell her that Madhavan would be happy only with Rani. The doctor also decides to leave the city the next morning. Madhavan sees the door of his bedroom opened. He is successful in getting out of the house through the back door but is shocked to see her there. She tells him that she was the one who opened all doors for him because she could not see him sad. She asks him to run with Rani. The mother blesses her son and he leaves. But when he reaches the circus tent, he is badly beaten up by Meesaikarar and his party. Rani is not allowed to leave. Kannas and Kadalas take Madhavan from there and help Rani run away with Madhavan. But Meesaikarar finds them. He tries to kill Madhavan but cannot.

After getting accepted by both families, Rani and Madhavan are getting married that day and all are invited to the marriage. When Kannas and Kadalas and their gang reach for the marriage, they are stopped at the gate. When they try to reach to Madhavan, they are stopped by his relatives. Kannas and Kadalas bid a tearful farewell to Madhavan, saying that their place is in the streets and they leave. While leaving, they leave a gift with the watchman for Madhavan. Madhavan's brothers-in-law stop the watchman, open the gift and find it is the trumpet. They throw the trumpet away, and it falls in front of Kannas and Kadalas. They take the trumpet and play the same tune. Madhavan comes from the house and he is welcomed to his marriage. He scolds his relatives for those kindnesses. Kannas and Kadalas then take their bag where they put waste materials and leave the place.

== Cast ==
- Ramana as Madhavan / Vignesh
- Kutti Radhika as Rani
- Ilavarasu as Kadalas
- S. V. Thangaraj as Kannas
- Rajeev as Vignesh's father
- Saranya Ponvannan as Devi, Vignesh's mother
- Manivannan as Kabuliwala
- Anandaraj as Meesaikarar
- Gowthami Vembunathan as Rani's mother
- Sabitha Anand as Amminiamma
- Pandu as Nair
- Thyagu as Paramaguru
- Vijay Ganesh as Circus Worker
- Bonda Mani as Circus Worker
- Muthukaalai as Circus Worker
- Raj Mohan as Vignesh's uncle
- Manohar as Vignesh's uncle
- Anjali Devi as Vignesh's aunt
- Susmitha as Rambha
- Manasa as Urvashi

== Production ==
The film is directed by debutant S. Ramu, who apprenticed under directors S. A. Chandrasekhar, Vincent Selva, A. Venkatesh and Thaha. A 17-day shooting was scheduled at the Gemini Circus in Chennai. Five hundred junior artistes too part in the scenes where even a couple of fight scenes and songs were picturised. The climax scene, where the eloped lovers are chased by the police and Anandraj's men, were shot in the Thalakkonam forest areas. It took 10 days and three cameras to shoot the scenes. The stunts were choreographed by Power Fast, and the camera cranked by Ravishanker.

== Soundtrack ==
Music was composed by Bharani.

No.	Song	Singers	Lyrics
1	"Kabuliwala"	P. Jayachandran	Muthulingham
2	"Karuvakattu"	Krishnaraj, Malathy	Yugabharathi
3	"Podavai Vaangi"	Krishnaraj, Malathy	Yugabharathi
4	"Kottu Kottu"	Manikka Vinayagam, Mahathi	Kalaikumar
5	"Paal Nilavile"	P. Jayachandran	Snehan
6	"Vaada Vaada"	Anita Udeep	Newton

== Reception ==
S. R. Ashok Kumar of The Hindu said, "Producer S. V. Thangaraj should have refrained from acting, as he is yet to learn the basics. Ilavarasu has excelled in his role as Kadalas. Manivannan as the Kaboolivala does a neat job while Anantharaj proves that he is one of the good performers who can handle any role with confidence. There is no need for `Kutty' Radhika, endowed with a charming face, to resort to heavy makeup which only produces the opposite effect. Ramana as the hero is convincing". Cinesouth wrote "For S.Ramu who had written the screenplay and directed the movie this film is his maiden effort. But this may well turn out to be the last one".
