= Avan Chandiyude Makan =

- VCD cover
- Directed by: Thulasidas
- Written by: Babu Janardhanan
- Produced by: Nirmal Roy G M
- Starring: Prithviraj Sukumaran; Vijayaraghavan; Sridevika; Baburaj
- Cinematography: K. P. Nambiathri
- Edited by: Raja Mohammad
- Music by: Sanjeev Lal
- Release date: 5 January 2007
- Country: India
- Language: Malayalam

Avan Chandiyude Makan is a 2007 Indian Malayalam-language film produced by Nirmal Roy G M, written by Babu Janardhanan and directed by Thulasidas. The film stars Prithviraj Sukumaran Vijayaraghavan, Sridevika and Baburaj with a musical score by Sanjeev Lal. This film was released along with the Tamil film Pokkiri.

== Plot synopsis ==
Chandy, an adamant, unsocial father of a Christian family that lives in Central Travancore, is against the new thinking of the new generation in the family.

== Cast ==
- Prithviraj Sukumaran as Kurien Chandy Sebastian
- Vijayaraghavan as Thattekkadu Chandy Outha Sebastian
- Sridevika as Sobha Pilla
- Baburaj as Peralithanam Sonichan
- Usha as Kochurani Chandy Sebastian
- Rekha as Aleykutty Chandy Sebastian
- Sona Nair as Susanna Chandy Sebastian
- Augustine as Kuncheria
- Anil Murali as Sub Inspector Hari
- P. Sreekumar as Constable Somanathan Pillai
- Kalasala Babu as Peralithanam Kunjukochu
- Kundara Johny as Bhargavan M.L.A.
- Shobha Mohan as Vasundhara
- Sadiq as Paul Chacko
- Aniyappan as Azhakappan
- Cochin Haneefa as Chackochi
- Narayanankutty as Prahladan
- Spadikam George as Circle Inspector Shivanadan
- Captain Raju - Parish priest
- Vakkom Jayalal - Cameo Appearance

Tamil version

- R. Sundarrajan as Chandy's brother
- Vennira Aadai Moorthy
- Muthukaalai as Servant

== Soundtrack ==
The music was composed by Sanjeev Lal and shot in Kochi and Karnataka. lyrics were written by Gireesh Puthenchery.

No.	Song	Singers	Lyrics	Music director	Length (m:ss)
1	"Kuruthola"	Afsal, Sabitha, Shobha	Gireesh Puthenchery	Sanjeev Lal	4:04
2	"Maampoo Pookkum"	Jyotsna, Anwar Sadath	Gireesh Puthenchery	Sanjeev Lal	4:47
3	"Mantharakkolusitta"	M. G. Sreekumar, Sujatha Mohan	Gireesh Puthenchery	Sanjeev Lal	3:44
4	"Seenaimaamalakal Vaazhthum"	Adolf Jerome, P. V. Preetha	Gireesh Puthenchery	Sanjeev Lal	3:15
