= Anbe Vaa (2005 film) =

2005 film by K. Selva Bharathy

- Theatrical poster
- Directed by: K. Selva Bharathy
- Screenplay by: K. Selva Bharathy
- Story by: Jayanthi Krishnamoorthy
- Produced by: Jayanthi Krishnamoorthy
- Starring: Thendral; Sridevika; Vivek
- Cinematography: Rajaratnam
- Edited by: B. S. Vasu; Saleem
- Music by: D. Imman
- Production company: Dragon Movie Productions
- Release date: 18 November 2005
- Running time: 140 minutes
- Country: India
- Language: Tamil

Anbe Vaa (transl. Come, My Love) is a 2005 Indian Tamil-language romantic comedy film directed by K. Selva Bharathy. The film stars newcomer Thendral, Sridevika and Vivek, with M. S. Viswanathan, M. N. Rajam, Rekha, K. Deepa Arunachalam and C. Duraipandian playing supporting roles. It was released on 18 November 2005.

== Plot ==
In Chennai, Karthik is a carefree art college student who spends his time drinking and enjoying time with his friends and his talkative uncle Nandha. Karthik is the son of a rich heiress. After finishing his studies, his mother urges him to marry someone or work in their company, but Karthik leaves his home and takes Nandha with him. Unable to find a place to stay, they return home. Karthik, who wants to avoid the responsibility of a job, accepts for an arranged marriage. In Madurai, Priya has finished her studies and returns to her native village. She also accepts for an arranged marriage to escape from her dead-end life in a small village. Karthik and his family come to the village to see the potential bride Priya. Karthik and Priya fall in love at first sight, accept to get married, and they marry with the blessings of their families. After the marriage, Nandha tells Priya that Karthik is heavily dependent on him and stubborn and asks her to take care of him from now on. Whereas Priya's family takes promises from Nandha to not make her cry or else they would teach him a lesson.

Karthik and Priya move in a flat in Chennai. The young couple decides to have enough space and privacy in their relationship, but Karthik's mother urges Priya to be more intrusive towards Karthik. Priya, being a disciplined person, is bothered by Karthik's carelessness. In one week, a dispute arises between the two as they find that they are not compatible. They split up, and Priya returns to her village.

Nandha then convinces Priya to come back home and tries his best to unite the young couple. Priya decides to seduce her husband in different ways. She tries to capitalise on her glamour and her culinary skills, but both her attempts fail miserably. Priya and Karthik then start to annoy each other. One day, things get out of control, and a furious Karthik threatens Priya with a knife, and she calls the police. The police arrests Karthik, and Nandha tries to change Priya's mind, but she slaps him. After this incident, Karthik applies for a divorce. In an attempt to save their marriage, Nandha sends the couple attending marriage counselling sessions, but they are hell-bent on getting a divorce. Priya's family has to resort to the rowdy Gaja to speed up the divorce process. At the 60th wedding anniversary of Priya's grandparents, the old couple and Nandha have an emotional speech changing Priya's negative thoughts about marriage, and she begs her grandparents for forgiveness for hurting their feelings. Gaja, who falls in love with Priya, kidnaps her, and Nandha urges Karthik to save her. During the fight, Nandha is stabbed by a henchman and is later saved at the hospital. Karthik too feels bad for hurting his family's feelings. The couple puts their egos aside and decides to unite for the benefit of all.

== Cast ==
- Thendral as Karthik
- Sridevika as Priya
- Vivek as Nandha
- M. S. Viswanathan as Priya's grandfather
- M. N. Rajam as Rajam, Priya's grandmother
- Rekha as Karthik's mother
- K. Deepa Arunachalam as Ramasamy
- C. Duraipandian as Priya's father
- Karate Raja as Gaja
- Manobala as Counsellor
- LIC Narasimhan as Flat President
- Cell Murugan as Man with love letters
- Chaams as House Owner
- Siva Narayana Murthy as House Owner
- Selvakumar as House Owner
- Periya Karuppu Thevar as Villager
- Chelladurai as Villager
- Jinda as Villager
- Julie as Priya's relative
- Kovai Senthil
- Arulrasan
- Nagendran
- Girija
- K. Devi
- Siva
- Sathyandran
- Ambani Shankar as Young Nandha
- Risha in a special appearance

== Production ==
All the songs were shot at Sri Lanka within 18 days as the country charged no fees.

== Soundtrack ==
Anbe Vaa

Soundtrack album by D. Imman
- Released: 11 July 2005
- Genre: Feature film soundtrack
- Language: Tamil
- Producer: D. Imman

D. Imman chronology
| ABCD (2005) | Anbe Vaa (2005) | Aanai (2005) |

The soundtrack was composed by D. Imman.

Track listing
| No. | Title | Lyrics | Singer(s) | Length |
|---|---|---|---|---|
| 1. | "Alek, Alek" | K. Selva Bharathy | Suchitra, D. Imman | 4:28 |
| 2. | "Kaal Koluse" | Na. Muthukumar | Harish Raghavendra, Balram | 4:32 |
| 3. | "Loyola" | Na. Muthukumar | Balram | 4:46 |
| 4. | "Naan Unnai" | K. Selva Bharathy | Shobha Chandrasekhar | 4:05 |
| 5. | "Olib Laila" | Na. Muthukumar | Kalpana, Timmy | 4:40 |
| 6. | "Pidikavilaida" | K. Selva Bharathy | Srilekha Parthasarathy, Karthik | 4:13 |
| Total length: | | | | 26:44 |

== Reception ==
Sify wrote, "Anbe Vaa depends largely on Vivek’s scintillating comedy show. His antics spice up the proceedings and the punch lines make you smile. Sreedevika is not bad for a first-timer. The film drags towards the end and music of D.Imman is a big let down. On the whole, this Selvabharathy directed film is funny in parts thanks to the one-man laugh brigade called Vivek". Lajjavathi of Kalki praised Vivek for shouldering the film. Chennai Online wrote "It's a very loosely etched script, the narrative style jerky, the director taking a very ambiguous way to convey his message that marriage is for keeps. The scenes of the clash between the couple could have been handled in a better way".
