= Gokulathil Seethai (film) =

1996 film by Agathiyan

- Theatrical release poster
- Directed by: Agathiyan
- Written by: Agathiyan
- Produced by: K. Muralidharan; V. Swaminathan; G. Venugopal
- Starring: Karthik; Suvalakshmi; Karan
- Cinematography: Suriyan
- Edited by: Lancy–Mohan
- Music by: Deva
- Production company: Lakshmi Movie Makers
- Release date: 10 November 1996
- Running time: 174 minutes
- Country: India
- Language: Tamil

Gokulathil Seethai (transl. Sita in Gokulam) is a 1996 Indian Tamil-language romantic drama film written and directed by Agathiyan, starring Karthik, Suvalakshmi and Karan in the lead roles. It was released on 10 November 1996, during Diwali, and won the Tamil Nadu State Film Award for Best Film Portraying Woman in Good Light. The film was remade in Telugu as Gokulamlo Seeta (1997), in Kannada as Krishna Leele (2000) and in Hindi by the same director as Hum Ho Gaye Aapke (2001).

== Plot ==
Rishi sleeps around through the efforts of a sophisticated, dedicated and ‘immigration officer’ . His father, whom Rishi considers to be his 'friend', voices his concern in a friendly way about Rishi's lifestyle and suggests him to try falling in love instead of spending all his hard-earned money on call girls. Rishi brushes him off, asking him to only worry about his earnings and that he would take of care of the expenditure.

Rishi offers his employee and old friend I.C. Mohan to take him to a show. Although hesitant at first (as Mohan refers I.C. to be inferiority complex), he agrees. The show turns out be a college show where a beautiful-looking Nila, doing her final year BBA, performs a song. Mohan instantly falls in love with her and, on the contrast, Rishi sets his sexual sight on her.

Rishi calls on the pimp to book Nila. The pimp gives his professional shot at it and ends up in jail, but Rishi bails him out. Mohan sends a tape that has his recital of her song, irritating Nila. She tries to throw the tape away, but her friends offer to use the tape to record something else. Intrigued by a couple of flower bouquets, she finds out the information about Rishi and meets him personally. Rishi proposes to sleep with her one night. Nila rejects his proposal, despite Rishi offering half of his property and walks away. But Rishi is quietly resolute to woo her into bed one night.

When Nila returns to her hostel, she finds the tape to have more info into it and hears a whining Mohan's marriage proposal. Nila takes sympathy towards Mohan and meets him at a beach and lays down her rules straight: She would fall in love, but only after marriage, and she is determined to be behind the success of the man she marries. She asks him to meet her mother formally if he is too desperate. While Nila takes a hiatus and visits home, her mother informs her that their family doctor friend is interested in marrying her. It is implied that she informs Mohan about this. Mohan meets up with Rishi at a restaurant that he is really in love and that ‘she’ is about to get married. On hearing that ‘she’ is Nila, Rishi is stumped and takes a brief moment to himself to kill his own sexual urge and decides to help his friend and gives him an idea to forge a letter and that he would take care of the rest.

When Rishi passes the letter through a drunk stranger to Nila on the night before her wedding, she shows it to her doctor groom. The doctor reads the ‘suicide’ note, empathises with Mohan, and encourages Nila to go ahead and marry him, wishing her good luck, promising that he would marry Nila's sister instead. Nila sneaks out of the wedding hall and gets into a car. The car stops halfway through, and Nila is surprised to see Rishi in the driver seat. Rishi reveals his surprise that Nila has not run away from the car and subtly acknowledges his own defeat. The car stops at a house. Rishi lets Nila out and tells her that the house was where he was born and that that is where her ‘first night’ is going to happen and asks her to go in. Nila warns Rishi that her first night will turn out to be Rishi's last night. Rishi sarcastically approves her "bravado" but still encourages her to go in. Nila enters that house confused until she sees Mohan begging his parents and his sister to approve his love for Nila. What follows is an ugly altercation among the four. Rishi, who is drinking outside the house, hears this and enters in. Mohan tells his parents that Rishi is his boss and he gave the house as a gift for their upcoming wedding. Mohan's parents speak ill of Rishi and sarcastically suggest him to marry Nila since he gave her a ride in the middle of the night. Mohan changes his mind soon and asks Rishi to drop Nila back off at the wedding hall. Rishi gets upset at Mohan and tries to convince him about Nila's trust, but in vain. Nila gives up on Mohan and asks Rishi to leave the place. Rishi leaves the house, calling Mohan an idiot. He offers to drop Nila off at the wedding hall, but she hesitates to go back, worrying about her sister's future. Rishi offers his own house until she finds a place on her own. Nila, who is initially sceptical, accepts the offer after Rishi's word that he will never mistreat someone in despair.

Rishi tells Mohan that he should have fired him for what he did the previous night but lets him stay due to his family debts. However, he confirms that their friendship is over. Rishi later takes Nila to a party where his friends mistake her for a call girl and embarrass her by asking her price per night. Rishi gets angry and storms out of the place with Nila. He apologises to her for what happened, but she shrugs it off by letting him know that Rishi had never been out with his mother or sisters or any other decent woman. This hurts Rishi, who drinks too much, and they get into a big argument. Nila cools him off by offering her friendship.

The pimp visits Rishi at his home the next day and is surprised to see Nila in and congratulates him on his conquest. Rishi clarifies to him that she is just a platonic friend and that he made a mistake and ruined her life. That day, Nila suggests a critical business solution to Rishi and his dad asks Rishi to hire her immediately. During a business lunch at the office, Rishi subtly suggests to Nila that she could still reconsider her decision about Mohan. Nila diplomatically changes the topic. A gossip fight within the office premise between Mohan and a colleague leads Rishi to intervene and stop. Mohan argues that he entered Nila's life in the first place, which makes Nila angry, who lashes out at Mohan pointing that he has never crossed her life at any point. She also says good things about Rishi and clarifies their relationship to other employees (a reference to the epic Ramayana is made by Nila, where everyone knows Sita's stage of life in Ashokavanam, but if Sita had been in Gokulam, she would have been safer and happier) that makes him feel good. Later, Rishi feels bemused on being asked to get out of Nila's room for her to be able to change her clothes after shower and starts to feel something new that he has never felt before and leaves the room.

An excited Rishi admits to his father that if what he feels is love, he just loves 'this love’ and asks his father to speak to Nila on behalf of him. His father agrees, but, when he privately talks to Nila, he asks her a question that upsets her, and she leaves the house. A totally Rishi asks Nila what upset her, which she refuses to tell.

Rishi argues with his father on having asked her such a stupid question and points out the differences between them and tells him that their relationship is over. He also asks his dad to get out of his house, for which his dad laughs and points out that the entire wealth is his hard-earned money and if someone has to get out, it should be Rishi. At that moment a phone call reveals that Nila had mentioned Rishi as her guardian at a ladies hostel. Rishi proudly points that out to his dad and storms out. Later, when the cook criticises Rishi's father for having done this to his son, Rishi’s father reveals that he talked to Nila the way he did not just to test her but to test Rishi as well. He also goes on to reveal that he is happy that Rishi is able to decide on his own and that he is confident that he will come back.

Rishi visits Nila at the hostel after a brief altercation with the security guard. Nila avoids talking to Rishi, who understands her anger and reveals to the entire group of women gathered there that the reason for his visit was not to force or harass Nila but to acknowledge that she has transformed him into a human being and that she is the only reason that he is now able to respect any woman. He bids goodbye and leaves as Nila stops him, she cries and apologises that she mistook Rishi to be a jerk like Mohan when he sent his father to speak on his behalf but now realises that he did it out of respect for her. She also accepts defeat of her own agenda by concluding that "there is nothing wrong in falling in love with someone like Rishi before marriage" and tells him that she loves him and they leave the hostel together.

== Cast ==
- Karthik as Rishi (Inspired by Rama)
- Suvalakshmi as Nila (Inspired by Sita)
- Karan as I.C. Mohan (Inspired by Ravana)
- Manivannan as Rishi's father (Inspired by Dasharatha)
- Thalaivasal Vijay as Pimp
- Pandu as Senthil, a cook
- Manohar as Scissor Manohar
- Agathiyan as Conductor
- Suvarna Mathew as Kaveri (guest appearance)
- Prabhu Solomon as Bouquet Giving Person (uncredited role)
- Vijay Sethupathi as an audience member at the Inter College Meet (uncredited role)

== Production ==
Suvalakshmi was added to the cast after the first choice Devayani was unable to commit to the film.

== Soundtrack ==
The music was composed by Deva and lyrics written by Agathiyan.

Track listing
No.	Title	Singer(s)	Length
1.	"Andhi Mantharai"	Suresh Peters, Anuradha Sriram	5:26
2.	"Enthan Kural"	K. S. Chithra	5:04
3.	"Nilavae Vaa" (Male)	Krishnaraj	5:16
4.	"Gokulathu Kanna"	S. P. Balasubrahmanyam, K. S. Chithra, Baby Deepika, Deva	5:12
5.	"Nilavae Vaa" (Female)	K. S. Chithra	5:16
6.	"Sorgam Madhuvil"	Mano	4:53
Total length:			31:07

== Awards ==
Gokulathil Seethai won the Tamil Nadu State Film Award for Best Film Portraying Woman in Good Light.

== Remakes ==
The film was remade in Telugu as Gokulamlo Seeta (1997), in Kannada as Krishna Leele (2000) and in Hindi as Hum Ho Gaye Aapke (2001) by the same director.
