= Kadhal Samrajyam =

- Directed by: Agathiyan
- Written by: Agathiyan
- Produced by: Subbu Panchu
- Starring: Aravind Akash; Anjana Sukhani; SPB Charan; Yugendran; Santhoshi; Venkat Prabhu; Gowtham Sundararajan; Subbu Panchu
- Cinematography: Rajesh Yadav
- Edited by: Lancy Mohan
- Music by: Yuvan Shankar Raja
- Production company: P. A. Art Productions
- Country: India
- Language: Tamil

Kadhal Samrajyam (transl. Empire of Love) is an unreleased Indian Tamil-language romantic comedy film which was shot from 2001 onwards. The film, directed by Agathiyan and produced by Panchu Arunachalam's son, Subbu Panchu, starred an array of children of famous actors and technicians. The film was launched and completed in 2002 and is ready for release, but, despite the release of the soundtrack and the trailer, it is yet to see the lights of day. It should have been the debut film of Aravind, Charan, Anjana, Venkat Prabhu and Santhoshi, but due to the delay of the film's release they got introduced into the film industry in different ways and through other films.

== Cast ==
- Aravind Akash
- Anjana Sukhani
- SPB Charan
- Venkat Prabhu
- Santhoshi
- Yugendran
- Gowtham Sundararajan
- Subbu Panchu
- Ajay Rathnam

== Production ==
The film was directed by Agathiyan and produced by Panchu Arunachalam's son, Subbu Panchu, who made his debut as a lone producer. The film starred an array of children of famous actors and technicians with singer S. P. Balasubrahmanyam's son, SPB Charan playing a pivotal role. Aravind Akash, son of popular dancer Susheela Neethi and daughter of TV artist Poornam, Santhoshi, played other lead roles Furthermore, singer Malaysia Vasudevan's son, Yugendran and Gangai Amaren's son Venkat Prabhu as well as Goutham, son of late actor 'Major' Sunderrajan played supporting roles. The film also featured Anjana Sukhani, a newcomer from Mumbai, in the leading female role. The film was launched and completed in 2002 and was ready for release, but, despite the release of the soundtrack and the trailer, it was shelved due to financial problems. It could have been the debut film of Aravind, Charan, Anjana, Venkat Prabhu and Santhoshi, but due to the delay of the film's release they got introduced into the film industry in different ways and through other films.

The film became the third successive film featuring Charan, Venkat Prabhu and Yugendran to become an unreleased venture, with the first being Poonjolai which was directed by Gangai Amaran in 1996. The film which featured Venkat Prabhu in the lead role alongside Sangeetha in her debut started in April 1996 but remained unreleased, despite Ilayaraaja's soundtrack for the film becoming available. Charan and Venkat Prabhu then featured in Premji Amaren's Wanted, with music by Yuvan Shankar Raja, which also featured their fathers in supporting roles. That film also failed to release and the pair teamed up in two further films, Unnai Saranadainthaen and Vasantham Vandhachu, before becoming popular.

== Soundtrack ==
The soundtrack was composed by Yuvan Shankar Raja with lyrics written by director Agathiyan himself. "Kalloori Paadam" is adapted from Yuvan's own tune "Sayantram Cheruvayindo" which he composed for the Telugu film Seshu. Vignesh Ram of Nilacharal wrote that "This album has a variety with melodious songs, peppy numbers, folk and theme music to satisfy people of all age group and tastes".

Song	Singers	Length
"Kalluri Padam"	Shankar Mahadevan	01:32
"Iru Kangal"	Balram, Gopika Poornima	04:49
"Sithanna Vasal"	S. P. Balasubrahmanyam, Sujatha	04:53
"Thozha Thozha"	Karthik	03:57
"Vidinjakka Kannalam"	Chitra Sivaraman	04:20
"Mullai Poo"	SPB Charan, Venkat Prabhu, Yugendran	04:33
"Yarum Ariya"	Pavithra	05:16
"Salsa — Theme Music"	Instrumental	01:33
