= Fools (2003 film) =

2003 Telugu film

- Film poster
- Directed by: Dasari Narayana Rao
- Written by: Dasari Narayana Rao
- Produced by: Ravindra Babu
- Starring: Dasari Narayana Rao; Srinath; Gajala
- Music by: Vandemataram Srinivas
- Production company: Sesha Sai Creations
- Release date: 6 February 2003
- Country: India
- Language: Telugu

Fools is a 2003 Indian Telugu-language romantic comedy film directed by Dasari Narayana Rao and starring himself, Srinath and Gajala. The film is inspired by the Malayalam film Godfather although that film had already been remade into Telugu.

== Plot ==
Deepti's parents accuse her of being in love. Although Deepti is not in love, she runs into Narasimha Rao and falls in love with him to make her parents' accusation true. Narasimha Rao is part of a large family headed by his father, A. V. Narasimha Naidu, that includes five brothers (Ranga, Rajarao, Subbarao, Apparao, himself) and a sister. Narasimha Naidu did not marry off his sons because he wanted to find the perfect girl for them. However, his daughter was ostracized from the family after running away with another man. When Deepti and Narasimha Rao realize that they are part of the same family because Narasimha Rao's sister is Deepti's mother, they try to reunite the family.

== Cast ==
- Dasari Narayana Rao as Ranga
- Srinath as Narasimha Rao
- Gajala as Deepti
- Giri Babu as Rajarao
- Kaikala Satyanarayana as A. V. Narasimha Naidu
- Chandra Mohan as Subbarao
- Sudhakar as Apparao
- Brahmanandam
- Kovai Sarala as Manga
- L. B. Sriram
- Shakeela
- Ramya Sri
- Rallapalli
- S. P. Balasubrahmanyam (guest appearance)
- Krishna as Deepti's father (guest appearance)
- Jayasudha as Deepti's mother (guest appearance)
- Krishna Kumari (guest appearance)

== Production ==
Durga Nageswara Rao, MS Kota Reddy, and Relangi Narasimha Rao worked as assistant director for the film with Relangi assisting with comedy scenes.

== Soundtrack ==
Music composed by Vandemataram Srinivas.

| Song | Lyricist | Singer(s) |
|---|---|---|
| "Soundaryama" | Dasari | M. M. Keeravani, Usha |
| "Bus Ekkite" | Taidala Bapu | Chakri |
| "Aaku Chatu Pindelam" | Suddala Ashok Teja | Radhika, Sudha Rani |
| "Tannulu Tinte" | Dasari | Devi Sri Prasad, Swarna Latha |
| Adugu Adagani | Dasari | R. P. Patnaik, Nishka |
| "Ooi Entoy" | Dasari | Vandemataram Srinivas, M. M. Srilekha |

== Reception ==
Gudipoodi Srihari of The Hindu said that "This is a full-length comedy, enjoyable almost throughout its run with Dasari at the helm. He handles the subject well as its director. Newcomer Srinath acts with ease". A critic from Sify wrote that "The film looks too jaded with an old fashioned story. There`s nothing new in the way the film is packaged". Manju Latha Kalanidhi of Full Hyderabad opined that the film's plot is "flimsy" and non-existent.
