= Sirf Tum =

- Directed by: Agathiyan
- Written by: Agathiyan; Anees Bazmee (dialogues)
- Story by: Agathiyan
- Based on: Kadhal Kottai (Tamil) by Agathiyan
- Produced by: Boney Kapoor
- Starring: Sanjay Kapoor; Priya Gill; Sushmita Sen; Jackie Shroff; Mohnish Behl
- Cinematography: Thangar Bachan
- Edited by: Waman Bhonsle
- Music by: Nadeem-Shravan
- Production companies: Narsimha Entertprises; Eros International
- Distributed by: Eros International
- Release date: 11 June 1999
- Running time: 171 minutes
- Country: India
- Language: Hindi
- Budget: ₹3 crore
- Box office: ₹11 crore

Sirf Tum (transl. Only You) is a 1999 Indian Hindi-language romance film directed by Agathiyan. It was released on 11 June 1999. The film features Sanjay Kapoor, Priya Gill, Sushmita Sen, Jackie Shroff and Mohnish Behl. Shot in Nainital, Kerala and Houston, it is a remake of the 1996 Tamil film Kadhal Kottai. It was a commercial success at the box office.

== Plot ==
Deepak Rai comes across a purse that contains educational certificates belonging to a woman named Aarti. He finds out that she lives in Nainital and mails her stuff back to her; this starts an enduring correspondence through letters.

Even though the couple has never seen each other, there is a mutual attraction. Aarti's older sister and brother-in-law, Nirmal, are encouraging to a certain extent. While Nirmal suggests she marry a Mr. Prem, a renowned young businessman in his neighborhood and business partner, Aarti's older sister wants Aarti to choose her own life partner.

One day, Aarti starts out on her journey to locate and meet Deepak without informing him that she is on her way. Deepak is currently living in Delhi as he has a job contract with his boss, Neha, temporarily there. Not helping matters is Neha, who is romantically inclined to him, too, but Deepak is not. His heart pines for Aarti. Due to this reason, he resigns, and desperate to make ends meet, starts to drive an auto rickshaw at the behest of Pritam, whom he had befriended when he respected him as a human when he first arrived in Delhi, and Pritam helped him when he did not have a place of his own.

During the correspondence, a few months back, Aarti had gifted Deepak a woollen sweater with an image of a "lit diya" knitted over it. When Aarti arrives in Delhi, she looks for Deepak's address and workplace, hoping she can meet him unaware and surprise him with her presence and see what he is really like. She fails to find Deepak and decides to go back because a week had passed and time was running out. She might not get a chance to come and meet him again. Sadly, she reaches the train station to return home.

Unbeknownst, when Aarti first arrived in Delhi and her rickshaw broke down, she had hired Deepak's auto and had been traveling with him the whole day. While Deepak drops her off at the station, someone mistakenly spills coffee over Deepak's shirt. Deepak removes his shirt, revealing the woollen sweater beneath. Aarti recognizes it, calls out Deepak's name loudly and both recognize each other and how they had been looking for each other the whole time.

The film ends with Aarti and Deepak embracing each other while Pritam and Jency look at them with joy.

== Cast ==
- Sanjay Kapoor as Deepak
- Priya Gill as Aarti
- Sushmita Sen as Neha
- Jackie Shroff as Pritam
- Jaya Bhattacharya as Jency
- Mohnish Behl as Ranjit
- Kader Khan as Phone Booth Operator
- Johnny Lever as Niranjan
- Shobha Khote as Hostel Warden
- Tej Sapru as Nirmal
- Shagufta Ali as Bharti
- Deepshikha Nagpal as Dancer in song "Kabhi To Kudi Phans Jayegi"
- Gurdas Maan as Himself in song "Kabhi To Kudi Phans Jayegi"
- Salman Khan as Prem (Special appearance)

== Soundtrack ==
Sirf Tum

Soundtrack album by T-Series
- Released: 12 March 1999
- Recorded: 1996–1997
- Genre: Feature film soundtrack
- Length: 68:00
- Label: T-Series

All songs are composed by Nadeem-Shravan, with lyrics penned by Sameer. Cassettes and CDs are available on T-Series.

The hit duet "Pehli Pehli Baar Mohabbat Ki Hai" became especially popular. The title track "Sirf Tum" reused the melody of "Kaalamellam Kadhal" from the 1996 Tamil film Kadhal Kottai, originally composed by Deva. Producer Boney Kapoor obtained the rights from Deva to adapt the tune for the Hindi remake.The title track is offered in both duet and female-only versions. "Dilbar Dilbar", sung by Alka Yagnik, was a chart-topper and later remixed for the 2018 film Satyameva Jayate. The album sold around 2.2 million units, ranking it the 9th best-selling Bollywood soundtrack in India in 1999. The long qawwali "Ek Mulaqat Zaroori Hai Sanam" appears twice—the original and a reprise version. "Dekho Zara Kaise Balkhake Chali" features Punjabi singer Gurdas Maan, who also appears in the song sequence.

#	Title	Singer(s)
1.	"Pehli Pehli Baar Mohabbat Ki Hai"	Alka Yagnik & Kumar Sanu
2.	"Sirf Tum"	Anuradha Paudwal & Hariharan
3.	"Dilbar Dilbar"	Alka Yagnik
4.	"Panchi Sur Main Gaate Hai"	Udit Narayan
5.	"Ek Mulakat Zaruri Hai Sanam"	Ameen Sabri & Fareed Sabri
6.	"Uparwala Apne Saath Hai"	Kumar Sanu
7.	"Dekho Zara Kaise Balkhake Chali"	Gurdas Maan
8.	"Sirf Tum"	Anuradha Paudwal
9.	"Ek Mulaqat Zaruri Hai Sanam" (Reprise)	Ameen Sabri & Fareed Sabri & Jaspinder Narula
