= Andha Naal Nyabagam =

- Directed by: Mani Bharathi
- Written by: Mani Bharathi
- Produced by: Sentamizh Shekhar
- Starring: Ramana; Sridevika; Tejashri
- Cinematography: Sethuraman M
- Edited by: Suresh Urs
- Music by: Bharadwaj
- Production company: Senthamizh Kalaikoodam
- Release date: 19 August 2005
- Country: India
- Language: Tamil

Andha Naal Nyabagam (transl. Memories of that day) is a 2005 Tamil-language romantic drama film written and directed by Mani Bharathi, who earlier directed Anbe Anbe (2003). The film stars Ramana, Sridevika and Tejashri. The film's title is based on a song from Uyarndha Manithan (1968).

== Cast ==
- Ramana as Gurumoorthy
- Sridevika
- Tejashri as Ritha
- Vadivelu
- Indu
- Ramji
- Y. G. Mahendran
- Thalaivasal Vijay

== Production ==
The film which was based on real events was initially titled Flashback but later changed to Andha Naal Nyabagam. The film was shot in Chennai, Vishakapatnam, Hyderabad and Pondicherry while the songs were shot at Malaysia and Singapore. The film was produced by Malaysia based businessman Senthamizh Sekhar and the film marks the debut of cinematographer Sethuraman M, who earlier assisted Santosh Sivan.

== Soundtrack ==
The soundtrack was composed by Bharadwaj.

Song	Singers	Lyrics
"Kadhal Podhum"	Suchitra	Mani Bharathi
"Naan Vazhnthida"	Vijay Yesudas	Palani Bharathi
"Oru Siragu Nee"	Srinivas, Janani Bharadwaj	Palani Bharathi
"Vaadi Vaadi"	T. L. Maharajan, Anuradha Sriram	Pa. Vijay
"Success Success"	Karthik	Na. Muthukumar

== Critical reception ==
Malini Mannath of Chennai Online noted that "Manibharathi crafts the screenplay in an interesting way. Most of the movie is a flashback and the scenes that launch the flashbacks are mounted in a way that makes us interested in how the flashback is going to play out." BizHat wrote, "The director has created the characters with utmost care which makes the film interesting. While the half moves interestingly, the second half lacks pace".
