= Vaanmathi =

- Poster
- Directed by: Agathiyan
- Written by: Agathiyan
- Produced by: Sivasakthi Pandian
- Starring: Ajith Kumar; Swathi
- Cinematography: Thangar Bachan
- Edited by: Lancy Mohan
- Music by: Deva
- Production company: Sivasakthi Movie Makers
- Release date: 12 January 1996
- Running time: 147 minutes
- Country: India
- Language: Tamil

Vaanmathi is a 1996 Indian Tamil-language romantic drama film written and directed by Agathiyan. It stars Ajith Kumar and Swathi in the lead roles. This film portrays hatred that slowly transforms into love between two young people who are from very different financial backgrounds. The film was released on 12 January 1996 and went on to become a commercial success.

== Plot ==
Krishna belongs to a middle-class family, where his father is a womaniser and brought up Krishna as a good for nothing fellow. Krishna is also a youngster who likes to waste time, by hanging out with his friends and roaming behind girls. Vaanmathi is the daughter of a rich business woman who is very arrogant and does anything for money. For example, she even abandoned her husband when Vaanmathi was a baby for money. Vaanmathi is a girl who grew up to be a bully, by bringing a bunch of friends in her vehicle and making fun of every guy they come across. Krishna and Vaanmathi play tricks on each other and fight after they met but eventually fall in love, but Vaanmathi's mother is not happy with that. She dislikes Krishna and considers him as her enemy no. 1. She tries everything to break them. Finally she arranges a marriage between Vaanmathi and son of the Governor of Tamil Nadu. Whether Vanmathi and Krishna's love wins over the arrogant mother forms the story.

== Cast ==
- Ajith Kumar as Krishna
- Swathi as Vaanmathi
- Vadivukkarasi as Padmavathy
- Vijay Krishnaraj as Varadharaj, Vaanmathi's father
- Pandu as Krishna's father
- Dhamu as Mimicry artist
- LIC Narasimhan as Padmavathy's lawyer
- Thideer Kannaiah as Krishna friend's father
- Bayilvan Ranganathan as Tea shop owner
- T. K. S. Natarajan

== Production ==
Vaanmathi is the first film produced by film producer Sivasakthi Pandian. He financed the film from the profits he made from distributing Muthu (1995).

== Soundtrack ==
The music was composed by Deva, with lyrics by Vaali.

Track listing
No.	Title	Singer(s)	Length
1.	"Arunachalam"	Swarnalatha	5:02
2.	"Oru Naalum"	P. Unnikrishnan, Anuradha Sriram	5:43
3.	"Poontha Malli"	Mano, K. S. Chithra	5:07
4.	"Pillayarpatti Hero"	Deva	4:42
5.	"Tata Seirra"	Mano	4:26
6.	"Vaikaaraiyil"	S. P. Balasubrahmanyam, K. S. Chithra	4:40
Total length:			29:06

== Release and reception ==
The film became a success and subsequently set up a future collaboration between the director and actor in Kadhal Kottai. D. S. Ramanujam of The Hindu wrote "Taming the rich, well-connected would-be mother-in-law and the love affair of the hero with her daughter, also starting on a stormy note, form the theme of Sivasakthi Movie Makers' Vaanmathi. The neglect of growing children by rich parents, the power of influence and money, an estranged husband watching the mental cruelties imposed on others by his rich wife, are all there for exploitation. But director Agathiyan, who has written the story, screenplay and dialogue, goes about his task in fits and starts. The role of the dominating rich lady is played by Vadivukkarasi with wanted venom, dwarfing other characters and enjoying more frames."
