= Santha =

2007 film by S. Muralimohan

- VCD cover
- Directed by: S. Muralimohan
- Written by: S. Muralimohan (screenplay & dialogues)
- Story by: Ajay Kumar
- Produced by: R. Vijaykumar; K. P. Srikanth
- Starring: Shiva Rajkumar; Aarti Chabria; Sridevika
- Cinematography: G. S. V. Seetharam
- Edited by: Nagendra Urs
- Music by: Gurukiran
- Production company: Best Cinema
- Release date: 18 May 2007
- Running time: 172 minutes
- Country: India
- Language: Kannada

Santha (transl. Saint) is a 2007 Indian Kannada-language crime film directed by S. Muralimohan, who also penned the dialogues and screenplay for a story by Ajay Kumar. The film stars Shiva Rajkumar, Aarti Chhabria and Sridevika in the lead roles. The film's theme was similar to the 1995 Shivarajkumar starrer Om for which Muralimohan worked as an associate director. Gurukiran scored and composed the film's soundtrack. Although the film was released on 18 May 2007 to negative reviews, the film had a large opening and turned out to be a commercially safe venture.

== Cast ==
- Shiva Rajkumar as Santha
- Aarti Chabria
- Sridevika
- H. T. Sangliana
- Komal
- Hema Chaudhary

== Soundtrack ==
Santha

Soundtrack album by Gurukiran
- Genre: Feature film soundtrack
- Language: Kannada

=== Tracks ===
1. "Superman Spiderman Pokémon" -
2. "Bhagyavantha Kai Kotta" -
3. "Dhava Dhava Dhava" -
4. "Naguvirali Sukavirali" -
5. "Naguvirali Sukavirali" (female) -
6. "Heart Anno Adda" -

== Reception ==
R. G. Vijayasarathy of IANS wrote that "If you want to see something fresh and different, then Santha has little to offer. But it may be a good viewing for Shivaraj Kumar's fans that are seeing an action thriller from their hero after a long time.". A critic from Rediff.com wrote that "Santha could have been much better if director Murali Mohan had worked hard on the script and had writer Ajay Kumar not dished another run-of-the-mill story". A critic from Chitraloka wrote that "Santha will be remembered well mainly because of the performances of Shivaraj Kumar and Komal".
