= Gopalapuranam =

- Directed by: K. K. Haridas
- Written by: Shornur Vijayan
- Produced by: C. P. Rafeeq; Zakheer Hussain
- Starring: Mukesh; Ramana
- Music by: Younaceo
- Production company: Chola Pictures
- Distributed by: Sacro Creations
- Release date: 17 March 2008
- Country: India
- Language: Malayalam

Gopalapuranam (transl. Purana of Gopala) is a 2008 Indian Malayalam-language epic comedy-drama film directed by K. K. Haridas and starring Mukesh and Ramana (in his debut of Malayalam film).

== Plot ==
Gopalakrishnan is the son of Gopalan Nair, who rears cows and sells milk for a living. Gopalan Nair, now in his sixties, finds it hard to continue with his job and calls for the assistance of Ramanan, the president of milkmen association and the only friend of Gopalakrishnan. Even though Gopalakrishnan could not pursue his studies after his sixth standard, he is not ready for any hard work and is only interested in making money the easy way.

Gopalakrishnan's only sister Nandini comes across a person named Vishnu and they soon get married. Vishnu is a gold smuggler who works under Mathew. Gopalakrishnan too joins smuggling business with Vishnu and proves himself as too good in that. But because of his greed he makes a big mistake and now the different gangs are behind him and Vishnu who wants their gold and money back.

== Cast ==
- Mukesh as Vishnu
- Ramana as Gopalakrishnan Nair (voiceover by Jis Joy)
- Sujibala as Nandini Nair
- Sai Kumar as Mathew
- Salim Kumar as Ramanan
- Rajan P. Dev as Gokulamveetil Gopalan Nair
- Shobha Mohan as Yashoda Nair
- Ponnamma Babu as Kunjibeevi
- Suja Menon as Sharika Nair
- Machan Varghese as Vasu
- Indrans as Sulthan Abdulkhader
- Jagannatha Varma as Karnavar
- Thesni Khan as Sandra
- Shantha Kumari as Bhavaniyamma
- Shanavas Shanu - Cameo appearance

== Soundtrack ==
The music was composed by Younaceo. The song "Nee Nilavo" sung by Vineeth Sreenivasan was ranked 6th by Galatta for the top ten Malayalam songs of January 2009.

== Reception ==
Paresh C. Palicha of Rediff.com rated the film 1/5 stars and wrote, "Uninteresting films like Gopalapur[an]am are making it to the theatres as bigger films release only during Vishu". The critic criticized the film's promotional efforts at tricking the audience that the film was a Mukesh-starrer when he had very less screentime.
