= Hum Ho Gaye Aapke =

2001 film by Agathiyan

Hum Ho Gaye Aap Ke
- Poster
- Directed by: Ahathian
- Written by: Sunil Kumar Agrawal; Ahathian
- Based on: Gokulathil Seethai by Agathiyan
- Produced by: Ganesh Jain; Ratan Jain
- Starring: Fardeen Khan; Reema Sen; Suman Ranganathan
- Cinematography: Ravi Yadav
- Edited by: Dileep Kotalgi
- Music by: Songs: Nadeem-Shravan; Score: Karthik Raja
- Production company: Venus Movies
- Release date: 3 August 2001
- Country: India
- Language: Hindi

Hum Ho Gaye Aap Ke (transl. I have become yours) is a 2001 Indian Hindi-language romantic drama film directed by Ahathian. The film stars Fardeen Khan and Reema Sen, in her debut. It is a remake of Agathiyan's Tamil film Gokulathil Seethai (1996). The film was released on 3 August 2001.

== Plot ==
Rishi Oberoi is the only son in the Oberoi family, who are wealthy and own a palatial home. Rishi is a womanizer, and often drinks. Mohan is an employee at Rishi's company and also his classmate from college. Rishi takes Mohan with him to an Inter College Beauty Contest. Chandni Gupta (Reema Sen) wins the beauty contest and gives a heart touching speech. In her speech she states that she wants to be the woman behind a successful man and even if her life partner is a coward she will help him become successful.

Rishi is smitten by her beauty and Mohan is mesmerized by her words. Rishi sends her flowers to impress her while Mohan records an audio cassette that he sends to her hostel.

Chandini agrees to meet Mohan and they start going out. One day Chandni's mother calls her back to her village and tells her that she has fixed her marriage to a doctor who is willing to marry her without any dowry and also pay for her younger sister's wedding. Chandni tells her mother that she has promised someone else and she cannot marry the doctor. Her mother insists and refuses to listen to Chandni. Chandni tries to contact Mohan at his office but the receptionist does not let them talk because she is interested in Mohan.

Mohan finds out about Chandni's wedding one day prior from her friends so he seeks Rishi's help.

He tells Rishi to go pick Chandni from her village while he convinces his parents. He also writes a letter to Chandni that the doctor who is going to marry her receives. The doctor was kind hearted and tells Chandni to go and marry the one she loves and he would marry her younger sister.

She leaves the house with Rishi who takes her to Mohan's village. Mohan's parents refuse to let him marry Chandni without dowry because they need the money for his younger sister Meena's wedding. Mohan's parents also threaten to commit suicide if he marries Chandni.

Mohan refuses to marry Chandni. Mohan tells Rishi to drop her back where he brought her from. Chandni leaves with Rishi, she is sad but she did not want to marry Mohan.

Rishi asks Chandni where she wants to go. She couldn't go back home because then her sister would not get married and she could not go back to the hostel because she did not want to face her friends.

So Rishi offers to take her to his house, hesitantly she agrees. Rishi's father welcomes her and tells all the servants to take care of her.

She attends an interview at Rishi's company and gets a job. She works there but does not speak to Mohan for a month.

Mohan tries to talk to her and she replies kindly. But it is clear that she does not have any feelings for him. She has simply moved on. Mohan still think she loves him. One day some employees were gossiping about Rishi and Chandni being in a relationship. Upon hearing this, Mohan get physically violent. Chandni and Rishi came to stop them. Chandni tells Mohan not to interfere in her life but he says that it is his right. Chandni enumerates all the ways in which he had wronged her and also praised Rishi.

Chandni had fallen in love with Rishi and Rishi felt the same. Rishi tried to confess his feelings but he couldn't. So he told his father to talk to Chandni.

Rishi's father asked her if she would marry him and she accepted but then he said that she is marrying him for his money. Chandni gets angry and leaves the house. Rishi tried to make her stop but she didn't listen. Rishis father told him what he had said and then even Rishi left the house. Chandni went and stayed at a girls orphanage to which she had donated the prize money she won at the beauty contest. They welcomed her and she stayed with them. One day when she was traveling with the sisters by train Rishi happens to be in the same compartment. Rishi tells her how much he loves her and how she changed him. Chandni also confesses her love and they both hug each other.

== Cast ==
- Fardeen Khan as Rishi Oberoi
- Reema Sen as Chandni Gupta (Hindi dubbed voice by Mona Ghosh Shetty)
- Apurva Agnihotri as Mohan Sachdev
- Suman Ranganathan as Nikki
- Sadashiv Amrapurkar as Manager Shyamu
- Suresh Oberoi as Mr. Oberoi, Rishi's father.
- Mahesh Thakur as Dr. Shekhar
- Anant Mahadevan as Brijbhan
- Shammi as Sarla Sharma
- Achyut Potdar as Mohan's father
- Suhas Joshi as Mohan's mother
- Kinjal Joshi as Mohan's sister
- Neena Kulkarni as Mrs. Gupta
- Meghna as Chandni's sister
- Ali Asgar as Manjeet

== Soundtrack ==
Hum Ho Gaye Aap Ke

Soundtrack album by Nadeem-Shravan
- Released: 14 May 2001
- Genre: Feature film soundtrack
- Length: 39:00
- Label: Venus Records & Tapes

The soundtrack was composed by Nadeem-Shravan with the lyrics written by Sameer.

#	Title	Singer(s)
1.	"Hum Ho Gaye Aap Ke"	Kumar Sanu, Alka Yagnik
2.	"Ishq Hai Kya"	Sonu Nigam
3.	"Abhi To Mohabbat Ka"	Udit Narayan, Alka Yagnik
4.	"Der Se Hua" (Female)	Alka Yagnik
5.	"Pehli Baar Dil Yun"	Kumar Sanu, Alka Yagnik
6.	"Re Mama"	Sunidhi Chauhan
7.	"Der Se Hua" (Male)	Kumar Sanu

== Reception ==
Sukanya Verma of Rediff.com called the film "plain illogical" and noted that it "lacks a good script". Taran Adarsh of Bollywood Hungama gave the film one out of five stars, writing, "On the whole, HUM HO GAYE AAP KE is a mediocre film that will face an uphill task at the ticket window."

During a special screening of the film, Feroz Khan, Fardeen Khan's father, reportedly exclaimed "What is this? What have y'all made?"
