= Unnudan =

- Theatrical release poster
- Directed by: R. Balu
- Written by: R. Balu
- Produced by: Aroma Mani
- Starring: Murali; Kausalya
- Cinematography: Thangar Bachan
- Edited by: B. Lenin; V. T. Vijayan
- Music by: Deva
- Production company: Sunitha Productions
- Release date: 18 October 1998
- Running time: 146 minutes
- Country: India
- Language: Tamil

Unnudan (transl. With you) is a 1998 Indian Tamil-language romantic drama film written and directed by R. Balu. The film stars Murali and Kausalya, while Vivek and Manivannan play supporting roles. It was released on 18 October 1998.

== Plot ==
Santhosh runs a medical store along with his uncle and he lives with his mother. Gowri is a medical student in a government hospital living with her grandfather. The two become friends and they love to be in the company of each other. Santhosh falls for gowri but is unable to express his feelings for her. Likewise, gowri falls for him but fails to reach him out through her letter. gowri's grandfather is supportive of her love and tells her that he will help her out and he promises to tell santhosh about this but unfortunately he passes away. As gowri complets her final exam, her parents are ready to take her back to cochin which is her home town. A letter she sends before reaches Santhosh's hands and he rushes to railway station to meet her. The train moves but a patient in the train gets abdominal pain due to pregnancy and gowri is called in for treatment, she treats the girl and a boy child is born and she names him 'santhosh'. As santhosh reaches her and they both join and get permission from her parents to be united forever.

== Cast ==
- Murali as Santhosh
- Kausalya as Gowri
- Manivannan as Santhosh's uncle
- Vivek as Santhosh's friend
- Chinni Jayanth as Madhesh
- Charle as Azhagu Sundaram
- Pandu as Venkatesh
- Madhan Bob
- Sumithra as Santhosh"s mother
- Kovai Sarala as Thayamma
- Bindu Panicker
- Alphonsa as Special appearance
- Pandiyan as Guest appearance

== Production ==
Filming took place in areas including Ooty and Mamallapuram (both Tamil Nadu), Alappuzha, Thiruvananthapuram and Kochi (all Kerala) and Mysore, Karnataka.

== Soundtrack ==
The music was composed by Deva, with lyrics written by Vairamuthu.

Song	Singers	Length
"Bul Bul Dhara"	Anuradha Sriram, Mano	05:11
"Cochin Madapura"	P. Unnikrishnan, Swarnalatha	05:48
"Kandupidi"	Harini, S. P. Balasubrahmanyam	06:13
"Kobama Enmel"	Hariharan	05:44
"Paalaaru"	Sabesh	05:34
"Vaanam Tharaiyil"	Hariharan	05:57

== Reception ==
A critic from Dinakaran noted "the one great highlight among all the plus points in the film is the excellent cinematography of Thangar Bachann! Especially the natural sceneries of Kerala and the songs' scenic backgrounds fill our eyes with aesthetic extravaganza!". D. S. Ramanujam of The Hindu wrote, "This is one Cupid's arrow that loses steam before reaching its target, so laborious is the narration of director, R. Balu". He added, "If the amount of care and attention the director has paid in selecting the locations to enact the drama as well as the song sequences had been bestowed on the story content the movie would have been something different, for the production values are rich like the cinematography of Thankar Bachchan". K. N. Vijiyan of New Sunday Times wrote, "If not for the numerous songs, this movie would have been even more enjoyable".
