= Ramana (actor) =

Indian Tamil film actor

- Born: Amar Ramana; 4 January 1978 (age 48)
- Occupations: Actor, Producer
- Years active: 1999–present
- Parent: Vijay Babu (father)

Ramana is an Indian actor and producer who has appeared in Tamil and Telugu films in leading and supporting roles. He is the son of Tamil actor Vijay Babu who is known for the role of Rajinikanth's younger brother in Padikkadavan. He is the wicket keeper for the team Chennai Rhinos in Celebrity Cricket League. He was credited as Srinath in Telugu films until 2010.

== Career ==
Ramana was initially meant to make his acting debut through the film Kurunji by debutant Pari, which he shot for alongside actress Uma. However, the film eventually did not complete production. Ramana made his debut in the films with the Tamil film Style released in the year 2002; though he is active in the industry since 1999. Ramana's first Telugu film was Utsaham released in the year 2003. He was credited as Srinath. Followed by the romantic comedy film Fools directed by Dasari Narayana Rao. Later, he collaborates in the movies Sankharavam with Anant Nag and Sarath Babu followed by Puttintiki Ra Chelli (2004) starring Arjun Sarja. He is also in the cast with the together both Sathyaraj and Sibiraj in the movie Jore (2004). Ramana (who played the villain in (Jore) along with Kutty Radhika (she debuted in Iyarkai) play the lead in Meesai Madhavan (2004), remake of successful Malayalam film Kabooliwala. In 2005, he acted in the main roles as Ayodhya, Rightaa Thappaa and Andha Naal Nyabagam.

Ramana debuting into Mollywood in the comedy movie Gopalapuranam appearing with Mukesh. He is a young hero with lots of potential. Unfortunately both his films have bombed at the box office. SSS Good luck films produces Ezhuthiyatharadi (2008) with Ramana the hero playing a lead role. The action movie Nayagan (2008) was inspired from the English thriller Cellular based on which a Hindi movie Speed had released about this time last year. Later, Ramana impresses with his cold villainy in Thunichal (2010) starring Arun Vijay. He appeared in the lead role in the latest release of 2011 Mahaan Kanakku which is considered to be impressive. His next films was Karu Palaniappan’s Jannal Oram (2013) and Magizh Thirumeni’s Meaghamann (2014). He starred in the supporting cast in the Lokesh Kanagaraj’s Kaithi (2019).

Ramana and Nandha, close friend of the actor, have started a film company called Rana Productions, which produced the hit show Sun Naam Oruvar starring Vishal on Sun TV. Then, he acted in the bilingual horror film Mane Number 13 (2020) who was shot in Kannada and Tamil released on Amazon Prime Video. He produced his first movie and performs as a negative role in the action thriller Laththi (2022) starring Vishal.

== Filmography ==
=== As actor ===
Year	Film	Role	Language	Notes and Ref.
2002	Style	Vetrivel	Tamil	credited as Amar
2003	Utsaham	Venu	Telugu	
2003	Fools	Narasimha Rao	Telugu	
2004	Sankharavam		Telugu	
2004	Puttintiki Ra Chelli	Ajay	Telugu	
2004	Jore	Vijay	Tamil	
2004	Suryam	Amar	Telugu	
2004	Meesai Madhavan	Madhavan	Tamil	
2005	Ayodhya	Shankar	Tamil	
2005	Rightaa Thappaa	Sathya	Tamil	
2005	Andha Naal Nyabagam	Gurumoorthy	Tamil	
2005	Thanks	Amar	Telugu	
2005	Andari Kosam	Ravi	Telugu	
2008	Gopalapuranam	Gopalakrishnan Nair	Malayalam	
2008	Ezhuthiyatharadi	Bharathi	Tamil	
2008	Nayagan	Sakthi	Tamil	
2010	Thunichal	Vinod	Tamil	
2010	Eedu Jodu		Telugu	
2010	Thambi Arjuna	Arjuna	Tamil	
2010	Thottupaar	Lingam	Tamil	
2011	Mahaan Kanakku	Jeeva	Tamil	
2012	Ajantha	Anand	Tamil	
2012	Swaranjali	Jeeva	Kannada	
2013	Jannal Oram	Justin	Tamil	
2014	Meaghamann	DSP Karthik Vishwanath IPS (Maalik)	Tamil	
2017	Smuggler		Kannada	
2019	Simba	Deepak	Tamil	
2019	Kaithi	Tips	Tamil	
2020	Mane Number 13	Nishok	Kannada	
2020	13aam Number Veedu	Nishok	Tamil	
2022	Laththi	Vellai	Tamil	
2023	Salaar: Part 1 – Ceasefire	Rinda	Telugu	

=== Producer ===
==== Rana Event ====
Year	Show	Channel	Language
2018–2019	Sun Naam Oruvar	Sun TV	Tamil

==== Rana Productions ====
Year	Movie	Language	Note
2022	Laththi	Tamil	
