= Kadal Pookkal =

2001 film by Bharathiraja

- Poster
- Directed by: Bharathiraja
- Screenplay by: Bharathiraja
- Story by: R. Rathnakumar
- Produced by: Sivasakthi Pandian
- Starring: Murali; Manoj K. Bharathi; Uma; Prathyusha; Sindhu
- Cinematography: B. Kannan
- Edited by: K. Pazhanivel
- Music by: Deva
- Production company: Sivasakthi Movie Makers
- Release date: 14 December 2001
- Country: India
- Language: Tamil

Kadal Pookkal (transl. Sea Flowers) is a 2001 Indian Tamil-language drama film directed by Bharathiraja, starring Murali, Manoj K. Bharathi, Uma, Prathyusha and Sindhu Menon. The film was released on 14 December 2001. Bharathiraja won the National Film Award for Best Screenplay, and Murali won the Tamil Nadu State Film Award for Best Actor.

== Plot ==
Karuthayya and Peter are best friends, sharing with each other their hopes and dreams. Karuthayya's plan to get his beloved sister Kayal married elsewhere is thwarted when he learns that she is in love with Peter. He hears this from Uppili, who has a soft corner for Karuthayya and vice versa. For his sister's sake, Karuthayya approaches Peter with the marriage proposal. A shocked Peter, who had all along shared an easy relationship with Kayal, consents for the sake of friendship. Peter then makes a counter proposal that Karuthayya marry his sister Maria. Peter however withholds the fact that Maria had been seduced by a man from the city and was carrying his child. Family honor being uppermost in his mind, friendship takes a back seat. But Peter does not know that Karuthayya was already aware of his sister's affair, though not of her pregnancy. Karuthayya, knowing his friend's aggressive nature, had not told Peter about the matter earlier. Karuthayya now throws the ball back in Peter's court, asking him to first get Maria's consent. Sure that Maria would not give her consent for the marriage. But to his shock Maria agrees.

Forced by her mother and Peter to toe the line, she had no other option. The two pairs get married. While Peter and Kayal are blissfully happy, Karuthayya and Maria have their own crosses to bear. A guilt-stricken Maria finally confesses to Karuthayya about Peter's treacherous act. A shocked and hurt Karuthayya goes to confront Peter. The man from the city appears on the scene. A furious Peter takes the unsuspecting youth on a boat ride, ties a stone on him, and dumps him into the sea. Karuthayya, who reaches the place, tries to save the guy.

== Cast ==
- Murali as Karuthaiya
- Manoj K. Bharathi as Peter (Voice-over by Ranjith)
- Umashankari as Kayal
- Sindhu as Mariyam (Voice over by Jaya vidhya)
- Prathyusha as Uppili (Voice over by Jothi Latha)
- Puthu Kavithai Jyothi as Peter's mother
- Shyam Ganesh as Fernandes
- Vaiyapuri
- Santhana Bharathi
- Sridhar as Susai

== Production ==
Tarun was initially offered Murali's role in this film. The film set in the backdrop of sea and was shot completely in Nagercoil.

== Soundtrack ==
Soundtrack was composed by Deva and lyrics were written by Vairamuthu. Venky of Chennai Online called it "A lovely sea breeze by Deva".

Song	Singers
Aadu Meyuthe	Sathya, Krishnaraj
Alai Alai	Unni Menon, Swarnalatha, Srinivas
Ogama I	Malaysia Vasudevan, Ganga
Ogama II	Deva, Ganga
Paithiyamaanene	Harini, P. Unnikrishnan
Siluvaigale	Anuradha Sriram, Unni Menon

== Critical reception ==
Tulika of Rediff wrote that Bharathiraja "shows no sign of being able to change his storytelling style to match the times". Malini Mannath of Chennai Online wrote, "it is a well-crafted script, the tale well told, the narration moving smoothly, and the scenes emotion-charged." Visual Dasan of Kalki praised the performances of actors, Kannan's cinematography and Bharathiraja's direction. Dinakaran wrote "Bharathiraja has proved that he's [an] ever-green director of exceptional quality". Sify praised the cast performances and added, "However the camera of Kannan is one of the highlights of the music. The music of Deva is disappointing. On the whole the film has far too many loose ends, still it is above average".
