= Kadhal Kottai =

- Poster
- Directed by: Agathiyan
- Written by: Agathiyan
- Produced by: Sivasakthi Pandian
- Starring: Ajith Kumar; Devayani
- Cinematography: Thangar Bachan
- Edited by: Lancy–Mohan
- Music by: Deva
- Production company: Sivasakthi Movie Makers
- Release date: 12 July 1996
- Running time: 167 minutes
- Country: India
- Language: Tamil

Kadhal Kottai (transl. The Fort of Love) is a 1996 Indian Tamil-language romantic drama film written and directed by Agathiyan, and produced by Sivasakthi Movie Makers. The film stars Ajith Kumar and Devayani in the lead roles, with Heera, Thalaivasal Vijay, and Karan in supporting roles. It revolves around two people who develop a romance anonymously.

Kadhal Kottai was released on 12 July 1996 and ran for over 275 days at the Tamil Nadu box office, becoming a silver-jubilee film. It was one of Ajith's highly successful films at the early time of his career. The film won the National Film Award for Best Tamil Feature Film, the National Film Award for Best Direction and the National Film Award for Best Screenplay (Agathiyan). In 1997, it was dubbed and released in Telugu as Premalekha. It was remade in Kannada as Yaare Neenu Cheluve (1998), in Bengali as Hothat Brishti (1998) and in Hindi as Sirf Tum (1999) by the same director.

== Plot ==
Kamali, a graduate, lives with her sister Malliga and brother-in-law Shekar (in Kotagiri, Nilgiris district, Tamil Nadu) and is searching for a job. While visiting Madras, her handbag is stolen and she fears she would lose her academic credentials. Suriya, an orphaned, carefree man who works in Jaipur, Rajasthan, finds the purse and sends it back to her, and a love develops through letters. They agree to love each other without meeting, as she sews and sends a gift pack containing a lotus-embroidered woollen sweater for him to wear when they meet for real. Suriya is soon transferred to Madras and stays with Siva, his new colleague.

Kamali too comes to Madras to find a job and stays with her friend Jensi. Neya, Suriya's new boss, is immediately smitten by him, but her repeated attempts to gain his love and affection fail as he is staunch about his love for Kamali. In the meantime, Suriya and Kamali run into each other without knowing who they really are, resulting in negative perception and misunderstanding. Refusing a job offer which would move her to Singapore, making it difficult for her to find Suriya, Kamali moves back to her hometown in despair.

Unable to withstand the advances of Neya, Suriya quits his job and gets sheltered by his friend Paneer, an auto rickshaw driver, who arranges for him to drive for a living. Jeeva, a wealthy businessman, expresses his interest in marrying Kamali to Shekar, but Kamali excuses herself from considering her as a prospective bride when she meets Jeeva in private and shares her unflinching love for Suriya, who even allows her to try and locate him one last time. Shekar, who initially dissuades Kamali's love finally gives in and half-heartedly allows her to go to Madras.

Upon arriving in Madras, which is experiencing severe monsoons, Kamali finds out that Jensi and the other hostel mates are not in town. Pinning hopes, she boards Suriya's auto rickshaw, without knowing that it is him, and searches for him desperately. At the end of the day, both of them get refreshed at his place, where he dons the sweater gifted by her, covering it with his uniform. As Kamali plans to head home, depressed, Suriya helps her board the Nilgiri Express. As the train departs, Suriya removes his shirt after tea spills over it. Kamali notices the sweater, deboards the train, and the pair finally unite, as Paneer and Jensi look on and rejoice.

== Cast ==
- Ajith Kumar as Suriya
- Devayani as Kamali
- Heera as Neya
- Raja as Jeeva
- Karan as Siva
- Manivannan as Kaliyaperumal
- Thalaivasal Vijay as Paneer
- Rajeev as Sekhar
- Sabitha Anand as Malliga, Kamali's sister
- Pandu as Ramasamy
- Indhu as Jensi, Kamali's friend
- Ra. Sankaran as Church Father
- LIC Narasimhan as Train passenger
- Ramji in a special appearance
- Rani as an item number in the song "Vellarikka"

== Production ==
The basic theme of the film was inspired from Purananuru literature on the relationship between King Kopperum Chozhan and poet Pisirandhaiyar, though they never met until Chozhan was close to death. Agathiyan initially wanted to make his directorial debut with this subject; since no producer was willing to produce the film, he made other films and earned his breakthrough with Vaanmathi. After its success, he chose Ajith Kumar, the lead actor of that film to play the lead role again, with Sivasakthi Pandian agreeing to produce the film.

Sangita was the first choice for the lead actress, but declined due to her commitments to Poove Unakkaga, resulting in Devayani being cast. Agathiyan had asked Devayani to change her glamorous on screen image for the film, and Devayani duly agreed with the film becoming the start of several other similar roles for her. The film was initially titled Nila Nila Odi Vaa before it was renamed Kadhal Kottai. Raja was initially reluctant to act, but joined the cast at the director's insistence.

== Themes and influences ==
Agathiyan has stated that many of the characters are intentionally named to convey their characteristics. Thalaivasal Vijay's character was named "Paneer" (fragrant) as the director felt the character was "a sweet person who spreads happiness", while Heera was named Neya (derived from the Tamil term Neyam) as Agathiyan felt she "deserved a lot of love". He described Karan's character Siva as "a representation of the quintessential friend in every gang, who loves to be in love, but hates staying in it for too long", contrasting him with Suriya's (Ajith) ideologies on romance.

== Soundtrack ==
The music was composed by Deva. The song "Kavalai Padathey" incorporates elements from both Carnatic and gaana music.

Tamil
No.	Title	Lyrics	Singer(s)	Length
1.	"Kaalamellam Kadhal"	Agathiyan	P. Unnikrishnan, K. S. Chithra	5:05
2.	"Kavalai Padathey"	Agathiyan	Deva	4:26
3.	"Mottu Mottu Malaradha"	Agathiyan	Swarnalatha	4:54
4.	"Nalam Nalamariya Aval" (Version 1)	Agathiyan	S. P. Balasubrahmanyam, Anuradha Sriram	4:48
5.	"Nalam Nalamariya Aval" (Version 2)	Agathiyan	Krishnaraj, Anuradha Sriram	4:49
6.	"Sivappu Lolakku"	Ponniyin Selvan	S. P. Balasubrahmanyam	5:23
7.	"Vellarikka"	Agathiyan	Deva, Krishnaraj	4:23
Total length:				33:48

All tracks are written by Bhuvana Chandra.

Telugu
No.	Title	Singer(s)	Length
1.	"Nee Pilupe Prema Geetham"	P. Unnikrishnan, K. S. Chithra	5:07
2.	"Digulu Padakuraa Sahodaraa"	Vandemataram Srinivas	4:28
3.	"Pattu Pattu Paruvaala Pattu"	Swarnalatha	4:55
4.	"Chinnadaana Osi Chinna Daana" (Version 1)	R. Krishanraj, Bhuvana Chandra	4:26
5.	"Priyaa Ninu Chuda Lekaa" (Version 2)	S. P. Balasubrahmanyam, Anuradha Sriram	4:49
6.	"Ye Rupe Lolaku Kuli Kenu"	S. P. Balasubrahmanyam	5:25
Total length:			29:10

== Critical reception ==
The Tamil magazine Ananda Vikatan appreciated the film by giving 52 marks, mentioning that the basic plot was a novel idea which had been given a good shape and life by the filmmaker. K. N. Vijiyan of New Straits Times wrote, "I had expected the usual story of college boy meeting girl with both parents objecting to their relationship. So I was pleasantly surprised when [Kaadhal Kottai] turned out to be a totally different experience." R. P. R. of Kalki also favourably reviewed the film, though they felt certain distracting moments such as Heera's revealing outfits, the dream sequence, auto stunt and fight sequences could have been avoided. D. S. Ramanujam of The Hindu wrote "A new kind of love story is given the trimmings and gloss in right proportion under the expert eye of director Ahathiyan (Vanmathi, Madhumathi) in Sivasakthi Movie Makers' Kathal Kottai making the viewers sit back and enjoy every frame."

== Accolades ==
National Film Awards – 1996

- Best Tamil Feature Film
- Best Direction – Agathiyan
- Best Screenplay – Agathiyan

Filmfare Awards South – 1996

- Best Director – Agathiyan

Tamil Nadu State Film Awards – 1996

- Tamil Nadu State Film Award for Best Film – Second Prize
- Best Director – Agathiyan
- Special Prize: Actress: Devayani
- Best Editor: Lancy–Mohan
- Best Costume Designer: Maasanam

Cinema Express Awards – 1996

- Cinema Express Award for Best Film – Tamil

== Remakes ==
Kadhal Kottai was remade in Kannada as Yaare Neenu Cheluve (1998), in Bengali as Hothat Brishti (1998), and in Hindi by the same director as Sirf Tum (1999). A Malayalam remake was planned by Mohan Paiyanur in early 1998, but the project eventually did not materialise.

== Legacy ==
Kadhal Kottai is considered a cult film and a landmark in Tamil cinema diverging from traditional romantic films of the time. This film has been included in the book Pride of Tamil Cinema written by G. Dhananjayan, which covers films between 1931 and 2013 that have earned national and international recognition. Dhananjayan wrote, "Kadhal Kottai is a trendsetting film which breathed new life into Tamil cinema and paved the way for revival of love themes in a big way". According to The Times of India the film hits the top list of romantic films made in Tamil cinema. The film also hit the list of top romantic films of Tamil magazines Ananda Vikatan and Dinamani. The film is considered one of the blockbuster films in the career of Ajith Kumar. Vijay's dance in the song "Kavalai Padathe Sagothara" also gained popularity. The film was released as a novel in 2010 under the same name. Some of the romantic scenes from the film were imitated by Vimal (Santhanam) and Aarthi's characters in Malai Malai (2009). In the 2021 film Master, a reference is made about the film when JD (Vijay) talks to Charu (Malavika Mohanan). While the film ridicules the idea of wearing a sweater in Rajasthan given the state's apparently perpetual humidity, Agathiyan mockingly responded that anyone visiting the state would know it is not always like that.

== Bibliography ==
- Dhananjayan, G. (2014). Pride of Tamil Cinema: 1931–2013. Blue Ocean Publishers. OCLC 898765509.
