= Agathiyan =

Indian film director (born 1952)

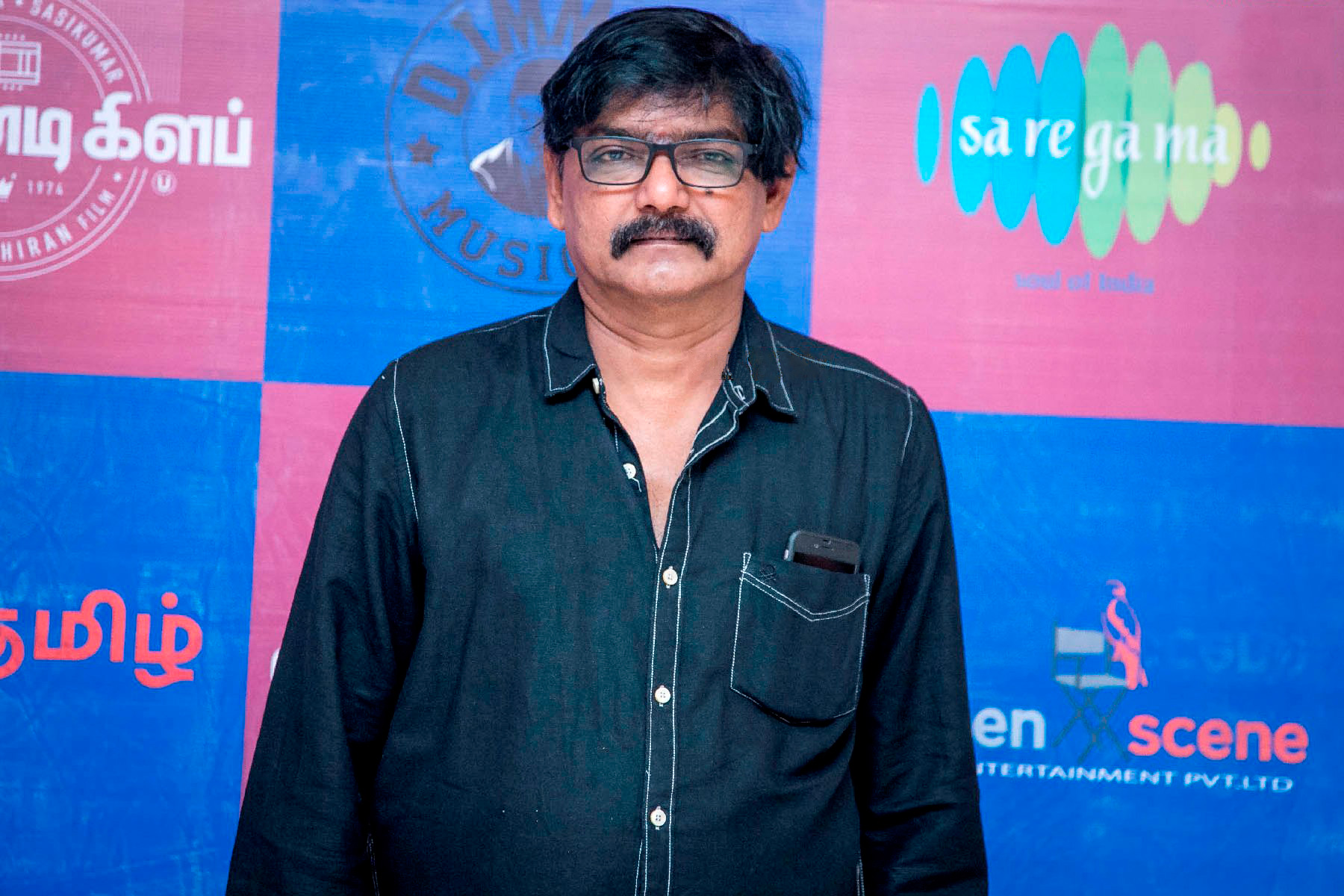
- Agathiyan at the "Kennedy Club" film Audio Launch
- Born: 18 August 1952 (age 74); Peravurani, Thanjavur district, Madras State (now Tamil Nadu), India
- Occupations: Director; screenwriter; producer; lyricist; actor
- Years active: 1991 – present
- Spouse: Radha (m. 1978; died 2016)
- Children: Vijayalakshmi Agathiyan; Niranjani Ahathian; Kani Thiru
- Relatives: Thiru (son-in-law)

Agathiyan (born 18 August 1952;) is an Indian film director, screenwriter, producer, lyricist, and actor. He was the first director in Tamil cinema to win the National Film Award for Best Direction for Kadhal Kottai (1996). For the film, he also won National Film Award for Best Screenplay and Filmfare Award for Best Director – Tamil.

== Career ==
Agathiyan, a director in his late forties entered films a decade back and struggled as an assistant to various directors. Hailing from a agriculturist family, he spent a happy-go-lucky time in college, and when he decided to pack his bags and come to Chennai to try his luck in films as a director, he lost his family's support. Struggling with no money, he did odd jobs in film companies and became an assistant to anyone who offered him food and shelter.

He wrote story for Ramarajan starrer Manasukketha Maharasa under the name Karunanidhi Santharam and initially directed a film called Mangalyam Thanthunanena in 1991 and was credited as Ravi Thasan but it was unsuccessful. Anbalaya Prabhakaran, who acted in that movie and also produces small budgeted films with new directors, gave Ahahtian his second break as a director with Madhumathi, a teenage love story with new faces. The film was a big hit. He was back to where he started, but again fate had bigger things in store for him. Sivasakthi Pandian, a film distributor turned producer, produced Vaanmathi with Ajith and Swathi. The film was a hit. Next came Kadhal Kottai from the same banner and Ahahtian became the toast of the industry. Offers poured in for films.

In late 2014, he began work on an untitled project produced by Bharathiraja starring Santhosh Prathap, Oviya, Vijayalakshmi and Manoj Bharathiraja, but the film was later shelved. He has served as jury member at 57th National Film Awards.

== Personal life ==
He married Radha in 1978. His elder daughter Kani (Karthika), host of Makkal TV, is married to film director Thiru. Kani Thiru is a winner of Vijay TV's Cook With Comali (Season 2). His second daughter Vijayalakshmi Agathiyan is an actress and is married to film director Feroz. His younger daughter Niranjani Ahathian is a costume designer and actress who is married to director Desingh Periyasamy.

== Awards ==
- Kalaimamani Award - 1998

== Filmography ==
- Note: all films are in Tamil, unless otherwise noted.

=== As film director ===
Year	Film	Language	Notes
1991	Mangalyam Thanthunane	Tamil	Credited as Ravi Thasan
1993	Madhumathi	Tamil	
1996	Vaanmathi	Tamil	
1996	Kadhal Kottai	Tamil	Also writer
1996	Gokulathil Seethai	Tamil	
1997	Vidukathai	Tamil	
1998	Kaadhal Kavithai	Tamil	
1999	Sirf Tum	Hindi	credited as Ahathian
2001	Hum Ho Gaye Aapke	Hindi	credited as Ahathian
2002	Kadhal Samrajyam	Tamil	Unreleased film
2003	Ee Abbai Chala Manchodu	Telugu	Credited as Agastyan
2004	Ramakrishna	Tamil	
2005	Selvam	Tamil	Also producer
2008	Nenjathai Killadhe	Tamil	

=== As writer ===
Year	Film	Credited as	Notes
Year	Film	Writer	Notes
1989	Manasukketha Maharasa	Story	Credited as Karunanidhi Santharam
1992	Pondatti Rajyam	Story	
1998	Santhosham	Yes	

=== As an actor ===
Year	Film	Role	Notes
1996	Kadhal Kottai		Cameo appearances
1996	Gokulathil Seethai		Cameo appearances
1999	Poovellam Kettuppar	Himself	Cameo appearances
2001	Vinnukkum Mannukkum		Cameo appearances
2007	Agaram	Thiru's father	
2011	Avargalum Ivargalum	Dr. Thamizhvanan	
2011	Maithanam	Velu	
2018	Mr. Chandramouli	Ramamurthy	

=== Television ===
==== Director ====
Year	Serial	Channel	Notes
2005	Pugazh	DD Podhigai	

==== Actor ====
Year	Serial	Channel	Notes
2024-2025	Moondru Mudichu	Sun TV	

=== As lyricist ===
Year	Film	Song(s)	Notes
1996	Kadhal Kottai	All songs	
1996	Gokulathil Seethai	All songs	
1997	Vidukathai	Idhayam Idhayam, Meenakshi Kaiyil, Kidaichuruchu	
1998	Santhosham	All songs	
2002	Kadhal Samrajyam	All songs	
2004	Ramakrishna	All songs	
2005	Selvam	All songs	
2008	Nenjathai Killathe	All songs	
2020	Meendum Oru Mariyathai	Kozhandhan Peru	

== Awards ==
National Film Awards

- 1997 – Best Direction – Kadhal Kottai
- 1997 – Best Screenplay – Kadhal Kottai
- 1997 – National Film Award for Best Feature Film in Tamil – Kadhal Kottai

Filmfare Awards South

- 1997 – Best Director – Kadhal Kottai

Tamil Nadu State Film Awards

- 1996 – Best Director – Kadhal Kottai
