= List of Tamil films of 2005 =

Post-amendment to the Tamil Nadu Entertainments Tax Act 1939 on 4 October 2004, gross fell to 115 per cent of net. The Commercial Taxes Department disclosed ₹43.65 crore in entertainment tax revenue for the year.

A list of films produced in the Tamil film industry in India in 2005 by release date:

== Box office collection ==
The following is the list of highest-grossing Tamil cinema films released in 2005.

The Highest Worldwide Gross of 2005
Rank	Title	Production company	Worldwide gross
1	Chandramukhi	Sivaji Productions	₹75−80 crore
2	Anniyan	Oscar Films	₹65−70 crore
3	Ghajini	Sri Saravana Creations	₹50 crore
4	Thirupaachi	Super Good Films	₹42 crore
5	Sivakasi	Sri Surya Movies	₹30−31 crore
6	Sandakozhi	GK Film Corporation	₹30 crore
7	Sachein	V Creations	₹28 crore
8	Aaru	Gemini Productions	₹23−24 crore
9	Ayya	Kavithalayaa Productions	₹21 crore
10	Majaa	Rockline Entertainment	₹18−19 crore

== List of Tamil films ==
=== January—March ===
Opening		Title	Director	Cast	Studio	Ref
J A N	12	Dancer	Keyaar	Kutty, Robert, Kanika		
J A N	14	Aayudham	M. A. Murugesh	Prashanth, Sneha		
J A N	14	Ayya	Hari	Sarath Kumar, Nayantara, Napoleon		
J A N	14	Devathaiyai Kanden	Boopathy Pandian	Dhanush, Sridevi Vijayakumar, Kunal		
J A N	14	Thirupaachi	Perarasu	Vijay, Trisha Krishnan, Mallika		
J A N	21	Iyer IPS	Hari Rajan	Sathyaraj, Megha, Sanghavi		
J A N	28	Ayodhya	R. Jayaprakash	Mohankumar, Ramana, Rekha Unnikrishnan, Ragini Nandwani		
F E B	4	Kannamma	S. S. Baba Vikram	Meena, Prem Kumar, Bose Venkat		
F E B	11	Ji	N. Linguswamy	Ajith Kumar, Trisha Krishnan		
F E B	18	Kannadi Pookal	K. Shahjahan	Parthiban, Kaveri		
F E B	18	Sukran	S. A. Chandrasekhar	Vijay, Ravi Krishna, Natassha		
F E B	18	Ulla Kadathal	Pugazhendhi Thangaraj	Vignesh, Yugendran, Kutty Radhika		
F E B	25	Aadhikkam	V. C. Guhanathan	Vignesh, Ranjith, Monal		
M A R	4	Kadhal FM	Jayaprakash	Manikandan, Shivani Singh, Aravind Akash		
M A R	4	Mannin Maindhan	Rama Narayanan	Sathyaraj, Sibiraj, Suha		
M A R	4	Raam	Ameer	Jiiva, Gajala, Saranya, Rahman		
M A R	4	Rightaa Thappaa	R. Bhuvana	Ramana, Uma		
M A R	10	Maayavi	Singampuli	Suriya, Jyothika, Sathyan		
M A R	11	London	Sundar C	Prashanth, Ankitha, Mumtaj, Pandiarajan		
M A R	18	Jathi	R. Vijaragava	Sathya, Sujitha		
M A R	18	Karagattakkari	Bharathi Kannan	Roja, SSR Kannan, Vilashini		
M A R	25	Kicha Vayasu 16	A. N. Rajagopal	Simran, Manikandan, Jai Akash		

=== April—June ===
Opening		Title	Director	Cast	Studio	Ref
A P R	1	Girivalam	Shivraj	Shaam, Richard Rishi, Tanu Roy		
A P R	1	Gurudeva	Jaffer	Jai Akash, Pranathi		
A P R	1	Thaka Thimi Tha	Sundar C	Yuvakrishna, Ankitha, Vivek		
A P R	8	Sevvel	Primose	Jai Akash, Rajkiran, Misha		
A P R	14	Chandramukhi	P. Vasu	Rajinikanth, Jyothika, Nayantara, Prabhu, Vadivelu		
A P R	14	Sachein	John Mahendran	Vijay, Genelia D'Souza, Vadivelu		
A P R	15	Mumbai Xpress	Singeetham Sreenivasa Rao	Kamal Haasan, Manisha Koirala, Ramesh Aravind		
M A Y	6	Jithan	Vincent Selva	Githan Ramesh, Pooja, Sarath Kumar		
M A Y	6	Karka Kasadara	R. V. Udayakumar	Vikranth, Lakshmi Rai, Diya, Vadivelu		
M A Y	12	6'2"	V. Senthil Kumar	Sathyaraj, Sunitha Varma, Vadivelu		
M A Y	13	Kana Kandaen	K. V. Anand	Srikanth, Gopika, Prithviraj		
M A Y	20	Amudhae	Ezhil	Jai Akash, Madhumitha, Pranathi		
M A Y	20	Arinthum Ariyamalum	Vishnuvardhan	Arya, Navdeep, Sameksha, Prakash Raj		
M A Y	27	Kadhal Seiya Virumbu	Ravi Bhargavan	Santhosh, Srisha, Aswitha		
M A Y	27	Neeye Nijam	Indhran	Shaan Vijay, Sumesh, Tejashree		
M A Y	27	Pesuvoma	S. K. Udayan	Kunal, Sharmilee		
M A Y	27	Power of Women	Jayadevi	Khushbu, Hariharan, Riyaz Khan		
J U N	3	Ullam Ketkumae	Jeeva	Shaam, Arya, Laila, Pooja, Asin		
J U N	3	Padhavi Paduthum Paadu	C. Ramalingam	Ranjith, Anamika		
J U N	17	Anniyan	Shankar	Vikram, Sadha, Prakash Raj, Vivek		
J U N	24	Englishkaran	Sakthi Chidambaram	Sathyaraj, Madhumitha, Namitha, Vadivelu		
J U N	24	Pon Megalai	Sakthi Chithran	Nithya Das, Abhinay, Charan Raj		

=== July—September ===
Opening		Title	Director	Cast	Studio	Ref
J U L	1	Kaatrullavarai	Radha Bharathi	Jai Akash, Pranathi		
J U L	15	Chinna	Sundar C	Arjun, Sneha		
J U L	22	Ayul Regai	K. G. Ashok	Thennavan, Karikalam, Sriji, Gayathri		
J U L	22	Priyasakhi	K. S. Adhiyaman	R. Madhavan, Sadha		
J U L	22	February 14	S. P. Hosimin	Bharath, Renuka Menon, Ajmal		
J U L	29	Daas	Babu Yogeswaran	Jayam Ravi, Renuka Menon		
J U L	29	Thullum Kaalam	Charana	Rajeev, Vineetha, Tharika		
A U G	5	Selvam	Agathiyan	Nandha, Uma, Vani		
A U G	5	Varapogum Sooriyane	S. Karuppusamy	Trivikram, Priyanjali		
A U G	10	Alaiyadikkuthu	Kalimuthu	Sindhu Tolani, Naveen Dhanush, Aari Arujunan		
A U G	12	ABCD	Saravana Subbiah	Shaam, Sneha, Aparna Pillai, Nandana		
A U G	15	Ponniyin Selvan	Radha Mohan	Ravi Krishna, Gopika, Revathi		
A U G	19	Andha Naal Nyabagam	Mani Bharathy	Ramana, Sridevika, Tejashree		
A U G	24	Chidambarathil Oru Appasamy	Thangar Bachan	Thangar Bachan, Navya Nair		
A U G	26	Oru Naal Oru Kanavu	Fazil	Srikanth, Sonia Agarwal		
S E P	2	Oru Kalluriyin Kathai	Nandha Periyasamy	Arya, Sonia Agarwal		
S E P	9	Anbe Aaruyire	S. J. Surya	S. J. Surya, Nila		
S E P	9	Thotti Jaya	V. Z. Durai	Silambarasan, Gopika		
S E P	16	Karpanai	Ashok Raj	Harish Raghavendra, Keerthi, Sudhi Nambiar, Arpitha		
S E P	23	Chanakya	A. Venkatesh	Sarath Kumar, Namitha, Laya		
S E P	23	Kalaiyatha Ninaivugal	Suraj	Vishwaji, Poorvaja		
S E P	23	Mudhal Aasai	A. R. Matheazhagan	Ganesh, Santhosh, Sitara Vaidya		
S E P	29	Ghajini	AR Murugadoss	Suriya, Asin, Nayantara		
S E P	30	Mazhai	S. Rajkumar	Jayam Ravi, Shriya Saran		

=== October—December ===
Opening		Title	Director	Cast	Studio	Ref
O C T	14	Kundakka Mandakka	Ashokan	R. Parthiban, Lakshmi Rai, Vadivelu, Mallika		
O C T	14	Thirudiya Idhayathai	Murali Krishna	Rohan, Kunal, Shubha Poonja		
O C T	21	Navarasa	Santosh Sivan	Shwetha, Khushbu, Bobby Darling		
O C T	28	Kasthuri Maan	A. K. Lohithadas	Prasanna, Meera Jasmine		
N O V	1	Adhu Oru Kana Kaalam	Balu Mahendra	Dhanush, Priyamani		
N O V	1	Ambuttu Imbuttu Embuttu	Ashok Kashyap	Tejashwini Prakash, Crane Manohar		
N O V	1	Sivakasi	Perarasu	Vijay, Asin, Prakash Raj		
N O V	1	Perusu	Kamaraj	Madhu, Neepa, Gemini Balaji, Deeptishri		
N O V	1	Majaa	Shafi	Vikram, Asin, Pasupathy		
N O V	11	Saadhuriyan	D. J. Kumar	Manoj Bharathiraja, Nandhana, Kunal, Bharathi		
N O V	18	Anbe Vaa	K. Selva Bharathy	Thendral, Sridevika, Vivek		
N O V	18	Bambara Kannaley	Parthy Baskar	Srikanth, Aarti Agarwal, Namitha, Vikramaditya		
N O V	20	Kanda Naal Mudhal	V. Priya	Prasanna, Laila, Karthik Kumar		
D E C	2	Aanai	Selva	Arjun, Namitha, Keerthi Chawla		
D E C	2	Thavamai Thavamirundhu	Cheran	Cheran, Padmapriya, Rajkiran, Saranya		
D E C	8	Manthiran	Ravichandran	Hamsavardhan, Sruthi, Rajan P. Dev		
D E C	9	Aaru	Hari	Suriya, Trisha Krishnan		
D E C	9	Vetrivel Sakthivel	Lakshmi Priyan	Sathyaraj, Sibiraj, Nikita Thukral, Khushbu		
D E C	16	Sandakozhi	N. Lingusamy	Vishal, Meera Jasmine, Rajkiran		
D E C	18	Veeranna	Kalanidhi	Napoleon, Anamika		
D E C	22	Vanakkam Thalaiva	Sakthi Paramesh	Sathyaraj, Abbas, Susan, Pranathi		
D E C	23	Sorry Enaku Kalyanamayidichu	Sagar	Sriman, Swarnamalya, Flora		
D E C	30	Plus Koottani	Babu Ganesh	Babu Ganesh, Manthra		

Other releases

The following Tamil films were also released in 2005, though the release date remains unknown.

Title	Director	Cast	Music director
Unnai Enakku Pidichuruku	Anbu Saravanan	Aswin, Aswini, Naveen, Munna	Sirpy
Iyyappa Saamy	Ravi-Raja	Pandiarajan, Ishaq Hussaini, Preethi Varma, Lavanya	Pradeep Ravi
Sendhalam Poove	A. C. Deepa Raj	Livingston, Devayani	Vimalraj
Thiru Thiru	S. D. Shri Ram Vasu	Pandiarajan, Nanditha Jennifer	
Pillayar Pettaiyum Kandhu Vattiyum	Govindarasu		
Pen Nila			
Pondatti Jeyichutta			
Povoma Oorgolam			
My Dear Ramasamy			
Rekkai	B. Lenin	G. V. Narayana Rao, M. S. Visalatchi, N. Madhan Kumar	Amarji
Vairavan	Karikalan	Karikalan, Pandiarajan, Karisma, Sathya	Aasan

== Awards ==
Category/organization	Film Fans Association Awards 16 September 2006	Filmfare Awards South 9 September 2006	Tamil Nadu State Film Awards 6 September 2007
Best Film	Anniyan	Anniyan	Chandramukhi / Ghajini
Best Director	Shankar; Anniyan	Shankar; Anniyan	Shankar; Anniyan
Best Actor	Vijay; Thirupaachi	Vikram; Anniyan	Rajinikanth; Chandramukhi
Best Actress	Asin / Jyothika / Sadha; Ghajini / Chandramukhi / Anniyan	Asin; Ghajini	Jyothika; Chandramukhi
Best Music Director	Harris Jayaraj; Anniyan	Harris Jayaraj; Anniyan	Harris Jayaraj; Anniyan / Ghajini
