= V. Jayaprakash =

Indian film director

- Born: Tamil Nadu, India
- Occupation: Film director
- Years active: 1997–present

V. Jayaprakash is an Indian film director and producer, who has directed Tamil language films. He rose to fame through the romantic drama Sathi Sanam (1997), and has gone on to make feature films including the dramas Kadhal FM (2005) and Ulagammai (2023).

== Career ==
Jayaprakash completed his degree in Tamil literature at Loyola College, Chennai, before taking on a master's degree in Presidency College and a further master's degree in philosophy at Annamalai University. He later completed a doctorate at Bharathidasan University. Jayaprakash started his career as a journalist in 1987 and entered the film industry by 1990, first working as an assistant to director Bharathiraja. He made his first film, Sathi Sanam in 1997, with the film earning tax-free status from the government.

Jayaprakash's second film Kadhal FM (2005) starred Manikandan, Shivani Singh and Aravind Akash in the lead roles. Prior to release, Jayaprakash described the film as an "out and out film of the youth, by the youth and for the youth".

Upon release, Malini Mannath of Chennai Online opined that "But otherwise, there's not much going for the film with its hotch-potch situations and lacklustre narration. A couple of suggestive lines have been surreptitiously pushed in, and the sound picturisations too border more on the 'sizzling' than the aesthetic".

In 2019, Jayaprakash worked on a film titled Kuchi Ice, a tale of how globalisation has affected lives and society, with Bharani appearing in the lead role. Despite completing shooting, the film did not have a theatrical release.

He later worked on a period socio-drama, Ulagammai, based on Oru Kottukku Veliye, a popular novel by Tamil writer Su. Samuthiram. The project garnered attention after the background score of the film, composed by Ilaiyaraaja, was released in March 2022, prior to its theatrical release. The film, starring Gouri Kishan in the lead role, later had a low-profile release in September 2023.

== Filmography ==
Year	Film	Notes
1997	Sathi Sanam	Debut film; received tax-free status
2005	Kadhal FM	Youth-oriented romantic drama
2019	Kuchi Ice	Unreleased film
2023	Ulagammai	Based on novel Oru Kottukku Veliye
2026	Mission C1000	
