= Ulagammai =

- Theatrical release poster
- Directed by: V. Jayaprakash
- Written by: Su. Samuthiram
- Produced by: V. Jayaprakash
- Starring: Gouri Kishan; Vetri Mithran; Pranav
- Cinematography: K. V. Mani
- Edited by: Suresh Urs
- Music by: Ilaiyaraaja
- Production company: Madras Digital Cinema Academy
- Release date: 22 September 2023
- Country: India
- Language: Tamil

Ulagammai is a 2023 Indian Tamil-language drama film directed and produced by V. Jayaprakash and starring Gouri Kishan and Vetri Mithran in the lead roles. Based on Oru Kottukku Veliye, a popular novel by Tamil writer Su. Samuthiram, the film was released on 22 September 2023.

The film garnered attention for releasing its background score over a year before the theatrical release of the film, marking the first such attempt in Tamil cinema.

== Cast ==
- Gouri Kishan as Ulagammai
- Vetri Mithran as Loganathan
- Pranav as Aruna
- G. Marimuthu as Marimuthu Nadar
- G. M. Sundar as Palavesam Nadar
- Arulmani
- Kandharaj
- Samy
- James

== Production ==
Director V. Jayaprakash, who had earlier made Sathi Sanam (1997) and Kadhal FM (2005), delayed post-production works on his project Kuchi Ice and began to make Ulagammai in early 2021. He brought the rights of Tamil writer Su. Samuthiram's popular novel Oru Kottukku Veliye from the writer's wife, and built a screenplay around the story. Gouri Kishan was cast in the lead role, while Ilaiyaraaja was signed as the film's music composer. The shoot of the film began in July 2021 in Tirunelveli. Production on the film was completed by April 2022.

In a novel move, the film's team released the background score of the film prior to the film's theatrical release in April 2022. This became the first instance of such a custom in Tamil cinema.

== Reception ==
The film was released on 22 September 2023 across theatres in Tamil Nadu. A critic from Maalai Malar gave the film a mixed review noting that the film told an "important story of a female's life". A further reviewer from Minnambalam, praised Ilaiyaraaja's work on the film.
