= Manikandan (name) =

Manikandan is a given name. Notable people with the name include:

- Manikandan (born 1983), Indian actor
- Manikandan R. Achari, Indian actor
- Manikandan Pattambi, Indian actor
- K. Manikandan, Indian actor, writer, and director
- M. Manikandan, Indian cinematographer, writer, and director
