= Sujibala =

Indian actress

- Occupation: Actress
- Years active: 2003-2016
- Spouse: Pranesh (m. 2016)

Sujibala is an Indian actress who predominantly works in Tamil films alongside a few Kannada and Malayalam films.

== Career ==
Sujibala played the secondary lead opposite Manikandan in Kicha Vayasu 16 (2005) and made her lead debut with the Kannada film Mr. Bakra (2005). She starred in lead roles in several low-key Tamil films such as Don Chera (2006). She made her Malayalam debut with Gopalapuranam (2008) and a critic noted that "Sujibala couldn't have chosen a worse debut vehicle in Malayalam". Regarding her performance in Iyakkam (2008), a critic wrote that she was lost in the contrived screenplay. She played a dhobi worker in Ayyavazhi (2008). She also was a semi-finalist on the second season of the game show Maanada Mayilada (2008) with Lokesh.

== Personal life ==
While working on the film Unmai (2012), the director P. Ravikumar proposed to her and threatened to kill himself if she declined. They got engaged and Sujibala was hesitant to marry him, so she attempted suicide by consuming sleeping pills.

In 2016, she married Pranesh, a man from Ooty working in a restaurant in Qatar.

== Filmography ==
Year	Film	Role	Notes
2003	Thennavan	Nurse	
2003	Galatta Ganapathy	Abi	
2004	Campus	Student	
2004	Dreams		
2005	Kicha Vayasu 16	Subbu	
2005	Mr. Bakra		Kannada film; credited as Rohini
2005	Chandramukhi	Kandaswamy's youngest daughter	
2005	Sakha Sakhi		Kannada film
2006	Don Chera	Geetha	
2006	Vanjagan	Jeeva	
2008	Gopalapuranam	Nandini Nair	Malayalam film
2008	Iyakkam	Malar	
2008	Ayyavazhi		
2009	Iru Nadhigal		
2009	Ilampuyal	Mozhi	
2009	Vaigai		Special appearance
2009	Suriyan Satta Kalloori		Special appearance
2010	Goripalayam	Rani	
2010	Pa. Ra. Palanisamy		Special appearance
2010	Thittakudi	Mallika	
2010	Meshtru		Kannada film
2011	Minsaram		Special appearance
2011	Muthukku Muthaaga	Raasathi	
2011	Uppukandam Brothers: Back in Action		Malayalam film
2011	Konjam Veyil Konjam Mazhai		Special appearance
2011	Kasethan Kadavulada		Special appearance
2012	Kazhugu	Valli	
2014	Kalavaram		Special appearance
2014	Vilaasam		
2016	Thirunaal		
2016	Anjukku Onnu		Special appearance

=== Television ===
Year	Title	Role	Channel
2007-2008	Maanada Mayilada (Seasons 1 & 2)	Contestant	Kalaignar TV
2009	Samayal Samayal with Venkatesh Bhat		Star Vijay
2012	Aan Paavam		Sun TV
