= Kaatrullavarai =

- DVD cover
- Directed by: Radha Bharathi
- Written by: Radha Bharathi
- Produced by: S. Suresh
- Starring: Jai Akash; Pranathi
- Cinematography: Kichas
- Edited by: Lancy - Mohan
- Music by: Bharani
- Production company: Sheeaasu Films
- Release date: 1 July 2005
- Running time: 140 minutes
- Country: India
- Language: Tamil

Kaatrullavarai (transl. As long as there is wind) is a 2005 Indian Tamil language romantic drama film directed by Radha Bharathi. The film stars Jai Akash and Pranathi, with Vadivelu, newcomer S. Suresh, newcomer Madhupriya, Rajesh, Rajeev, Kazan Khan and R. Sundarrajan playing supporting roles. The film, produced by S. Suresh, was released on 1 July 2005.

== Plot ==
Narmadha is one of the leading actresses of Tamil cinema while Bala is her car driver. Bala, who has a stutter, tries his best to protect Narmadha from danger but Narmadha hates the sight of him and doesn't miss a chance to scold him. In the meantime, the carefree young man "Burma" Bala, an ardent fan of Narmadha, wants to marry her. Thereafter, "Burma" Bala and Narmadha's maid Kausi fall in love with each other. After a new misunderstanding, Narmadha orders Bala to get out of her house. Her father Ramkumar then explains to her why Bala worked for them all along despite her insulting remarks.

A few years back, Bala was the son of the village chief and dreamt to become a playback singer. He then left his village and came to Chennai, nobody was ready to give him a chance to sing and all his attempts to become a singer failed. Meanwhile, Narmadha who was still studying in college got an opportunity to act as a heroine in a film. First reluctant, she accepts when she needed money for her mother's heart surgery. During the shooting of her first film, Narmadha and her father Ramkumar met Bala, they felt pity for him and decided to help him. Bala stayed in Narmadha's home and before the death of Narmadha's mother, Bala promised her to make her daughter Narmadha a successful actress. Bala and Narmadha eventually fell in love with each. Later, Narmadha's first film got negative reviews during the test screening, so the film's financier planned to kill Narmadha before its release to create publicity thus making it a blockbuster film. Bala who had listened to his conversation tried to save her from the goons. During the fight, Narmadha and Bala got injured in the head but they managed to escape and ended up in a mass marriage ceremony. Ramkumar who was with them agreed for the wedding and they got married. When Bala's father learned about the wedding, he gave Bala one of his properties and disowned his son. Later at the hospital, Narmadha had been diagnosed with selective amnesia (she didn't remember anything for the past two years) whereas Bala developed a stutter. To release Narmadha's first film, Bala sold his property and paid the film's producer. Upon release, Narmadha received acclaim for her acting by critics and audience alike but the film flopped and Bala lost all his money. However, Narmadha was flooded with offers to act in films. To save his daughter's acting career and her mother's dream, Ramkumar begged Bala to not disclose about their wedding at any moment and Bala began to work as her car driver.

Narmadha, who finally learns of Bala's sacrifices, decides to put an end to her acting career and to live with her husband Bala. Bala and Narmadha live happily ever after.

== Cast ==
- Jai Akash as Bala
- Pranathi as Narmadha
- Vadivelu as "Watchman" Venkatesh
- S. Suresh as "Burma" Bala
- Madhupriya as Kausi
- Rajesh as Ramkumar
- Rajeev as Bala's father
- Kazan Khan as Mahesh
- R. Sundarrajan as Kanakku
- Santhana Bharathi as Peethambharan
- T. P. Gajendran as Director
- Pandu as Ranga
- Kumarimuthu as Kumarimuthu
- Poongavanam as Rao
- P. R. Varalakshmi as Narmadha's mother
- Aarthi as Jyothika
- Viji Ketti as Bala's mother
- Kumaresan as Director Kumar
- Vellai Subbaiah
- MLA Thangaraj
- Ganeshkar as Jackie Chan
- Ravi Shanth as Bheem boy
- Kottachi
- Bonda Mani as Watchman
- Halwa Vasu as Goyyathoppu Ayyasamy
- Singamuthu as Photo album astrologer
- Vengal Rao as Korangu Kuppusamy
- V. M. Subburaj as Govindasamy
- Vijay Ganesh as Marriage broker
- Priyanka as Host
- Usha Elizabeth as Maid
- Vennira Aadai Moorthy as Venkatesh's father (uncredited)
- P. Vasu in a cameo appearance
- Jaguar Thangam in a cameo appearance
- Vandar Kuzhazhi Smitha in a special appearance

== Production ==
Director Radha Bharathi who directed films such as Vaigasi Poranthachu (1990) and Kizhakke Varum Paattu (1993) made his return to Tamil cinema after a hiatus with Kaatrullavarai under the banner of Sheeaasu Films. Jai Akash was chosen to play the hero of the film and paired once again with actress Pranathi after Gurudeva (2005). S. Suresh, the producer of the film played an important role and Madhupriya, a debutante acted opposite him, while Vadivelu handled the comedy.

== Soundtrack ==
Kaatrullavarai

Soundtrack album by Bharani
- Released: 8 April 2005
- Recorded: 2005
- Genre: Feature film soundtrack
- Length: 36:49
- Producer: Bharani

Bharani chronology
| Meesai Madhavan (2004) | Kaatrullavarai (2005) | Thirudiya Idhayathai (2005) |

The film score and the soundtrack were composed by Bharani. The soundtrack features 8 tracks.

Track listing
| No. | Title | Lyrics | Singer(s) | Length |
|---|---|---|---|---|
| 1. | "Aanvaasamum Penvaasamum" | Kabilan | Karthik, K. S. Chithra | 4:44 |
| 2. | "Mazhaiyil Nanaindha" (male 1) | Yugabharathi | Karthik | 4:42 |
| 3. | "Naa Unnai Nee Ennai" | Pa. Vijay | Krishnaraj, B. Sumi | 4:00 |
| 4. | "Sevandhiye Sevandhiye" | Kavi Bhaskar | Harish Raghavendra | 5:08 |
| 5. | "Mazhaiyil Nanaindha" (female) | Yugabharathi | K. S. Chithra | 4:43 |
| 6. | "Unnai Nambithan" | Chandrakanthi | Harish Raghavendra, B. Sumi | 4:41 |
| 7. | "Mazhaiyil Nanaindha" (male 2) | Yugabharathi | P. Jayachandran | 4:43 |
| 8. | "Rahala Kattungada" | Annamalai | Tippu | 4:08 |
| Total length: | | | | 36:49 |

== Reception ==
A critic from Sify opined that "What happens when a star struck youngster and producer decides to play action heroes? Kaatrullavarai directed by veteran Radha Bharathi is a badly made film with no logic or storyline".
