= Nenjathai Killadhe =

Nenjathai Killadhe (lit. 'Don't Pinch Your Heart' in Tamil) may refer to:

- Nenjathai Killathe, a 1980 Indian Tamil-language romantic drama film by Mahendran
- Nenjathai Killadhe (2008 film), an Indian Tamil-language romantic drama film
- Nenjathai Killadhe (2014 TV series), an Indian soap opera aired on Zee Tamil
- Nenjathai Killadhe (2024 TV series), an Indian soap opera
