= Thavam =

- Title card
- Directed by: Sakthi Paramesh
- Story by: Puri Jagannadh
- Produced by: Arjun
- Starring: Arun Vijay; Vandana Gupta
- Cinematography: Freddy J David
- Music by: D. Imman
- Production company: Sree Raam Films International
- Release date: 5 October 2007
- Country: India
- Language: Tamil

Thavam (transl. Penance) is a 2007 Tamil-language romantic drama film directed by Sakthi Paramesh and produced by Arjun, who also has a cameo appearance in the film. A remake of the Telugu film Itlu Sravani Subramanyam, it stars Arun Vijay and Vandana Gupta while Vadivelu, Janagaraj, and Kalairani play supporting roles. The music was composed by D. Imman. The film released on 5 October 2007. The dialogue Aahan spoken by Vadivelu in this film is famous.

== Plot ==
The film begins with Sumathi and Subramaniam, strangers to one another, meeting at a suicide point in Chennai. They realise that their goal is the same: suicide. Both had chosen to end their lives and duly write suicide notes. Sumathy's reason for taking the extreme step is her nagging relatives, who are also her guardians and are after her ancestral money. Subramaniam is cheated by a friend who promises him a job in Dubai after taking Rs. 5 lakh from him. Both consume sleeping pills in a bid to end their lives in Subramaniam's room.

However, Subramaniam and Sumathi are rescued by the house owner Mani. Life takes a turn, and Subramaniam lands a good job, while Sumathy's relatives take her home. Subramaniam's marriage is settled with a girl of his mother's choice, and Sumathy's marriage is fixed with her maternal uncle. Both flee the respective marriage halls independently. How they reunite forms the crux.

== Cast ==
- Arun Vijay as Subramaniam (Subramani)
- Vandana Gupta as Sumathi
- Vadivelu as Keeripulla
- Arpitha
- Janakaraj as Mani
- Kalairani
- Vennira Aadai Moorthy as Sumathi's uncle
- Madhan Bob as Subramaniam's boss
- Bonda Mani
- Vasu Vikram
- Singamuthu
- Ennatha Kannaiya
- Balaji
- Arjun as Marudhamalai (Cameo Appearance)

== Production ==
The film was shot at Kovalam, Arjun Garden, Pankajam theater, AVM Studio, Reddiar Bungalow and T R Garden and two of its songs were picturised at Chalakudi and Pollachi.

== Soundtrack ==
The soundtrack was composed by D. Imman. The audio launch was held on 13 September 2007 at Taj Coromandal Hotel, Chennai.

All lyrics are written by S. Muthazhagan and Thabu Shankar.

Track listing
No.	Title	Singer(s)	Length
1.	"Enga Oorumel"	Janani Madhan (Jey), Franco	04:36
2.	"Kannadasa Kannadasa"	Mahalakshmi Iyer, Karthik	04:18
3.	"Kannadasa Kannadasa" (Mix)	Sudha Raghunathan, Mahalakshmi Iyer	04:10
4.	"Makku Paiya"	Priya Subramaniam, Ananthu	04:20
5.	"Meenu Meenukutty"	Adarsh, Harini	04:42
6.	"Sandakozhi Neethanda"	Jyotsna, Naveen	04:52
Total length:			26:58

== Critical reception ==
Nandhu Sundaram of Rediff.com wrote, "Debutant Sakthi Paramesh directs the proceedings as if he doesn't give a damn. Lesser pleasure the audiences take home, the merrier. Nearly every known film device -- plot, logic and good dialogue -- is thrown to the winds as actors and technicians recklessly go through the mere motions of making a movie." Chithra of Kalki praised acting of cast, music, Vadivelu's humour, cinematography, fights, dialogues and stated the director who managed to extract good acting from cast has completely failed in the screenplay. She said the director had bored us with weak, predictable scenes and uninteresting incidents and concluded saying despite having good plot, good artists, this Thavam (penance) ceases halfway due to not taking efforts.

Malini Mannath of Chennai Online wrote, "Arjun appears in a cameo as the saviour of Subbu in a tense situation, and wishes him all success. Relate this to the well-intentioned effort of the Action King in producing the film to resurrect the down and out career of Arun. But unfortunately, this film with not many high points, and with not much chance for 'heroism', hardly makes for an ideal comeback vehicle for the 'Rising Star'!". Chennai Vision wrote, "Director Sakthi Paramesh has succeeded to an extent in recreating the magic of the original. The movie would have been more interesting, had the tempo maintained till the end".

== Legacy ==
In early 2015, a quote and shot from the film has been used as a meme template, called "Aahaan". This word was spoken by Vadivelu in one comedy scene involving him and Arun Vijay at a bus stop. The exact reason for this sudden phenomenon is unspecified, but it is believed that due to the unspecific tone that he says this line in, and given the fact that he has said this line frequently throughout his career with different tones, it has become a fan-favourite quote.
