= Ayudha Porattam =

2011 Indian Tamil-language film directed by Jai Akash

- Theatrical release poster
- Directed by: Jai Akash
- Written by: Jai Akash
- Produced by: N.J. Satheesh; N.V. Nisha; N.J. Akshay; N.J. Aishwariyaa
- Starring: Jai Akash; Preethi Minal; Anita Reddy
- Cinematography: Sai Sathish
- Music by: Nandhan Raj; S.S. Athreya
- Production company: Jai Balaji Movie Makers
- Release date: 9 September 2011
- Running time: 125 minutes
- Country: India
- Language: Tamil

Ayudha Porattam (transl. Armed protest) is a 2011 Indian Tamil-language action drama film directed by actor Jai Akash and starring himself, Preethi Minal and Anita Reddy .

== Plot ==
The employees of Field Weapon Factory (F. W. F), a company that manufactures weapons and sends them to Sri Lanka, are sent to Sri Lanka by their boss. After arriving in Sri Lanka, Bhumika (Preethi Minal) falls in love with Jai (Jai Akash), and Rekha (Anita Reddy) falls in love with another man. Ganesh (Theepetti Ganesan) is also in love with Rekha. Jai and Ganesh smoke ganja (marijuana), but Jai stops the bad habit for Bhumika. While the employees are feeling the nation, they meet a freedom fighter leader (Jai Akash) who wants to kill the employees as their company is responsible for the deaths of many people. How Jai convinces the leader to spare his life forms the rest of the plot.

== Cast ==
- Jai Akash as Jai / Freedom fighter leader (dual role)
- Preethi Minal as Bhumika
- Anita Reddy as Rekha
- Theepetti Ganesan as Ganesh
- Sai Kiran as Sai
- Adith Seenivas as Hussain

== Production ==
This film was shot in China, Hong Kong, and Thailand. The songs were scheduled to be shot in London, France and Germany. Ayudha Porattam is about Tamil people from India meeting Sri Lankan Tamils.

== Soundtrack ==
The songs were composed by Nandhan Raj, who also collaborated with Akash for Kadhalan Kadhali (2012). The first CD from the audio launch was given by Vijay Antony to Prabhu Solomon. The trailer was released by P. L. Thenappan and received by Kalaipuli Sekharan. Additional music was composed by S.S. Athreya with Snehan as the lyricist.

Title	Lyricist	Singer(s)
"Ramar Nadu"	Tamil Amudhan	Ranjith
"Ishtam Pole"	Andal Priyadarshini	Charulatha Mani, Nandhan Raj
"I know you love me"	Senthamizh Dhasan	Balaji, Roshini
"Badham Pazham Pondra"	Andal Priyadharshini	Madhumitha, Jessie Gift
"Iniyavale, Iniyavale"	Tamil Amudhan	Srinivas

== Reception ==
The New Indian Express gave the film a negative review and wrote that "Ayudha Porattam is confused issues, and misguided direction. A few more misadventures such as this, rather than resurrecting the hero’s dipping career, will, on the contrary, make it non-existent". Sify too gave a negative review and stated, "The basic premise of the story is interesting, but the screenplay and characters are half-baked".
