= Looty =

2001 film by Sakthi Paramesh

- Poster
- Directed by: Parameswar
- Story by: Prithvi Rajkumar
- Produced by: V. A. Durai
- Starring: Sathyaraj; Roja; Mumtaj
- Cinematography: B. Kannan
- Edited by: B. Lenin; V. T. Vijayan
- Music by: Deva
- Production company: Evergreen Movie International
- Release date: 14 January 2001
- Running time: 145 minutes
- Country: India
- Language: Tamil

Looty is a 2001 Indian Tamil-language comedy film directed by Parameswar. The film stars Sathyaraj in triple roles, Roja and Mumtaj. The film, produced by V. A. Durai, was released on 14 January 2001.

== Plot ==
Rasappa (Sathyaraj) and Vellaiappa (Vadivelu) were mechanics and good friends. They grew older so they were determined to get married as soon as possible. Vellaiappa was in love with Sona (Kalpana). Geetha (Roja) left her home after her step-mother's pressures. Geetha was accidentally kidnapped by Rasappa who thought that she was Sona and Rasappa fell in love subsequently with Geetha. Vellaiappa married his lover Sona while Rasappa married Geetha.

After a few years, Rasappa became a rich businessman but the couple didn't have children, whereas his friend Vellaiappa and Sona had two children. The doctor revealed that Geetha was unable to become a mother. Then suddenly one day, Rasappa found an abandoned baby in his car. After much hesitation, the couple adopted the baby. However, Geeta began to suspect Rasappa for being Jeeva's real father.

After finishing his study overseas, Jeeva is back and he shocks everybody when he arrives, Jeeva and Rasappa are looking alike, sending Geetha into a fit of fury, all her suspicions confirmed, despite Rasappa's bewilderment and protests of innocence, while Jeeva begins to flirt with Gayatri (Mumtaj) and they both end in love. Finally, the real culprit is revealed as Rasappa's father English Kuppan, a chieftain and a lecherous old man in the village who was almost on his deathbed and couldn't keep his hands off a nurse assigned to him. The result being a little stepbrother for Rasappa. And the man who put the baby in the couple's car was Kuzhanthavelu, the family doctor, who was in the know of things. But his good intentions had backfired. But then it's all well that ends well.

== Cast ==
- Sathyaraj as Rasappa, Jeeva and English Kuppan (triple roles)
- Roja as Geetha, Rasappa's wife
- Mumtaj as Gayathri, Jeeva's love interest
- Vadivelu as Vellaiappa, Rasappa's friend
- Vivek as 'Thiruttu VCD' Thiyagarajan, Geetha's stepbrother
- Kalpana as Sona, Vellaiappa's wife
- Visu as Dr. Kuzhanthavelu
- Pandu as Subramanian, an advocate
- Ponnambalam as Thiyagarajan's henchman
- Madhan Bob as Lawyer
- LIC Narasimhan as Dr. Narasimha
- Mayilsamy as Mayilu, Jeeva's friend
- Soundar
- Kottachi

== Soundtrack ==
The soundtrack was composed by Deva.

| Song | Singer(s) | Lyrics | Duration |
|---|---|---|---|
| "Mannaa Mannaa" | Swarnalatha | Kavi Markandeyar | 5:24 |
| "Missu Missu Pappa" | Anuradha Sriram, Krishnaraj | Vaali | 5:26 |
| "Once More Ketka" | S. P. Balasubrahmanyam, K. S. Chithra | Vaali | 4:56 |
| "Sillunu Kaaththu" | Mano, Swarnalatha | Vaali | 5:34 |
| "Velu Vadivelu Enn" | Deva | Vaali | 5:47 |
| "Madurakara Viveku" | Vadivelu, Sabesh | Vaali | 4:30 |

== Reception ==
The Hindu wrote, "despite a hackneyed script and clichéd plot twists, the film is entertaining because it maintains a light tone throughout. At no point does it become over-dramatic and that, one must add, is a saving grace!". Chennai Online wrote "the film turns out to be a damp squib, with a meandering screenplay, inept handling, time factor that goes hay wire, and comedy that tries out your patience". Cinesouth wrote "After giving a comic label to the film, they try to tell a serious story that too without any logic at all. The final scenes are confusing and confounding. The audiences are driven to a tight corner, not knowing whether to laugh or weep".
