= Pilisthe Palukutha =

- Directed by: Kodi Ramakrishna
- Written by: Kodi Ramakrishna
- Produced by: Sajjala Srinivas
- Starring: Akash; Shamita Shetty
- Music by: M. M. Keeravani
- Production company: Radha Chithra
- Release date: 23 January 2003
- Running time: 129 minutes
- Country: India
- Language: Telugu

Pilisthe Palukutha is a 2003 Indian Telugu-language divine romantic film directed by Kodi Ramakrishna. The film stars Akash, Shamita Shetty (in her Telugu debut) with Vijay Chandar in a supporting role. The film was released on 23 January 2003. Music and background score by M. M. Keeravani.

== Plot ==
Pilisthe Palukutha is a religious romantic Telugu film, which talks about the life in college of students Akash, Sunil & Shamita Shetty and the love between Akash and Shamita Shetty. Suddenly Shamita's life takes a turn due to a brain tumor and believes Sai Baba can save her from dying, which he does along with converting all the non-believers into his devoted devotees. Akash, Shamita and Sunil are the students of the college.

Vijay Chander, plays the role of Shirdi Sai Baba whose divine help is sought by the young lovers (Akash and Shamita Shetty). Dharmavarapu Subrahmanyam plays a devoted and lovable principal. Chandra Mohan has an important role as a beggar and is connected with the love story between the hero and heroine.

== Cast ==
- Akash as Ajay
- Shamita Shetty as Shanti
- Vijayachander as Sai Baba
- Sunil as Ajay's friend
- AVS as Shanti's father
- Dharmavarapu Subramanyam as College Principal
- L. B. Sriram
- M. S. Narayana
- Mallikarjuna Rao as Advocate
- Chandra Mohan as Nana
- Sudeepa Pinky as Shanti's sister
- Gautam Raju
- Hema
- Sana as Shanti's mother

== Music ==
The music was composed by M. M. Keeravani and features a seven-minute song on Sai Baba.

Track listing
No.	Title	Lyrics	Singer(s)	Length
1.	"Devi Nundi Digivachina"		S. P. Balasubrahmanyam	6:27
2.	"Manasa Ottu"	Sirivennela Seetharama Sastry	K. S. Chithra	4:52
3.	"Pilisthe Palukuthanani"	Sirivennela Seetharama Sastry	S. P. Balasubrahmanyam	6:10
4.	"Students Students Thummedha"		Godwin, Gopika Poornima	4:19
5.	"Rotte Kavalante"	Kulasekhar	K. S. Chitra, Karthik	5:38
6.	"Bujjulu Bujjulu"	Kulasekhar	K. S. Chitra, Karthik	5:27
7.	"Nuvve Muddu Nadake Muddu"		Karthik	4:52
8.	"Priyathama"	Kulasekhar		1:45
9.	"Andhala Muddula Gummaku"	Kulasekhar	R. P. Patnaik, Nitya Santoshini, Kulasekhar	5:30
Total length:				45:00

== Reception ==
A critic from Full Hyderabad wrote that "Piliste Palukutha may have a salvation message hidden in it somewhere, but it doesn't seem very strongly presented". The film was a box office failure.
