= Andal Priyadarshini =

- Born: 1962 (age 63–64); Palayamkottai, Tirunelveli district, Madras State (now Tamil Nadu), India
- Occupations: Tamil poet, lyricist, short story writer., novelist

Andal Priyadarshini is a Tamil language poet and lyricist, short story writer, and novelist. Currently she is working as a head program officer of Coimbatore Podhigai TV channel.

She was awarded the titles Kavi Chemmal and Ezhuthulaga Sirpi.

She studied in Chennai Sri Sarada Vidhyalaya school, from which she received best former student award.

== Books ==
- Suruthi Pisakatha Veenai
- Mudhal Oliparappu Aarambam
- Vidivai Thedi
- Pudhiya Thiruppavai

== Filmography ==
=== As lyricist ===
- "Notta Kudu" from Kola Kolaya Mundhirika (2010)
- "Ishtam Pole" and "Badham Pazham Pondra" from Ayudha Porattam (2011)
- "Idhuthane Engal Veedu" from Nellai Santhippu (2012)
