= Santhosha =

- Directed by: M. R. Ramesh
- Written by: M. R. Ramesh
- Produced by: M. N. Murthy; S. Indumathi
- Starring: Siddharth; Rajesh Krishnan; Anita Hassanandani; Pranathi
- Cinematography: Bhoopathi; Krishna Kumar
- Edited by: Suresh Urs
- Music by: Stephen Prayog
- Production company: Aalap Productions
- Release date: 10 November 2004
- Country: India
- Language: Kannada

Santhosha (transl. Happiness) is a 2004 Indian Kannada-language romantic drama film directed by M. R. Ramesh in his directorial debut. The film stars Siddharth, Rajesh Krishnan, Anita Hassanandani and Pranathi.

== Cast ==
- Ananth Nag as Siddhu's father
- Siddharth as Siddhu
- Rajesh Krishnan as Rajesh
- Anita Hassanandani as Anitha
- Pranathi as Ramya
- Sadhu Kokila as a doctor
- M. S. Umesh as a servant
- R. G. Vijayasarathy as a doctor
- Ravi Kemmu as Ramya's father
- Chitra Shenoy as Siddhu's mother
- Sparsha Rekha as Siddhu's sister

== Production ==
Santhosha was co-produced Ramesh's wife, Indumathi. The film marked the acting debut of Siddharth, a model who worked in advertisements for companies like Raymond Group, Bombay Dyeing, Park Avenue, and Vimal. Rajesh Krishnan, who initially only worked on the film as a playback singer, made his Kannada acting debut after director Ramesh told him the story. He expressed his affinity towards "soft, romantic characters" similar to Arvind Swamy in Roja (1992). Richa Pallod and Anita Hassanandani were initially selected as the heroines. However, Pranathi was brought in as Pallod's replacement, and this film marked her Kannada debut. She plays a college student in the film, who after several encounters with Siddharth's character, falls in love with him. She felt that the film was thematically similar to Khushi (2003). The film also features the 2001 Gujarat earthquake in its prelude.

The film was shot at Abbaiah Naidu Studio in Bengaluru. The song "Chamile Chamile" picturised on Siddharth and Anita was choreographed by the director himself. Mumbai-based choreographers Vittal and Harshal, who have worked with Saroj Khan, are debuting in Kannada cinema through this film.

== Soundtrack ==
The music was composed by Stephen Prayog.

No.	Song	Singer(s)	Lyrics
1	"Brahma Kotta"	Sri Devi	V. Nagendra Prasad
2	"Chamile Chamile"	Rajesh Krishnan, Shamitha Malnad	M. N. Vyasa Rao
3	"Ee Baduku Sundara"	Rajesh Krishnan	Nagathihalli Chandrashekar
4	"Kothi Kaili Maanikyave"	Tippu, Nanditha	Nagathihalli Chandrashekar
5	"Manasella Thumbiruve"	Hariharan	Pradeep
6	"Oh My Love"	Hariharan, Chaitra H. G.	V. Nagendra Prasad
