= Yajamana (2000 film) =

2000 film by Radha Bharathi

- DVD cover
- Directed by: R. Sheshadri; Radha Bharathi
- Written by: Ravi Srivatsa (dialogues)
- Screenplay by: R. Sheshadri; Radha Bharathi
- Story by: Vikraman
- Based on: Vaanathaippola (Tamil) by Vikraman
- Produced by: K. Mustafa; Smt. Meharunnisa. K. Rehman
- Starring: Vishnuvardhan; Shashi Kumar; Abhijith; Prema
- Cinematography: Ramesh Babu
- Edited by: P. R. Soundar Raj
- Music by: Rajesh Ramanath
- Production company: Oscar Films
- Release date: 1 December 2000
- Running time: 161 minutes
- Country: India
- Language: Kannada
- Box office: ₹16 - ₹17 crore

Yajamana (transl. Figure Head) is a 2000 Indian Kannada-language drama film directed by R. Sheshadri and Radha Bharathi. The film stars Vishnuvardhan, Shashikumar, Abhijith, and Prema. It is a remake of Tamil film Vaanathaippola, which released at the same year. The movie became an industry hit by creating many records.

== Plot ==
Shankar sacrifices his own interests and refuses to marry in order to focus his attention on supporting and educating his three younger brothers. However, his life changes when a girl falls in love with him.

== Cast ==
- Vishnuvardhan in dual role as Shankar / Ganesha
- Shashi Kumar as Subramanya
- Abhijith as Shanmukha
- Prema as Sangeetha
- Avinash as Devaraj
- Ramesh Bhat as Ramesh
- Tennis Krishna as Tippesha
- Pavitra Lokesh as Lakshmi
- Swathi as Keerti
- M. N. Lakshmi Devi as Ammamma
- Lakshman as Rajeeva, Sangeetha's father
- Ashalatha as Sangeetha's mother
- Shivaram as hotel owner
- R. G. Vijayasarathy as Swamiji at hotel
- Archana
- Shobaraj
- Ravi Srivatsa
- Michael Madhu as Beggar
- Kazan Khan as Keerthi's cousin who wants to marry her

== Production ==
Two songs were shot at Nepal and Darjeeling. The film was shot at Chikmagalur while the hotel scenes were shot on a set at Kadur Road, Bangalore.

== Soundtrack ==
Yajamana
- Soundtrack cover

Soundtrack album by Rajesh Ramanath
- Released: 1 April 2000
- Genre: Feature film soundtrack
- Length: 34:47
- Language: Kannada
- Label: Anand Audio

The official soundtrack contains all songs tuned by Rajesh Ramanath with all the tunes reprising from the Tamil original composed by S. A. Rajkumar except the song "Mysore Mallige". The lyrics for the tracks were penned by K. Kalyan. The album consists of eight tracks. The song "Namma Maneyalli" is based on "Dil Deewana" from the Hindi film Daag (1999), which itself borrows its charanam from "Pehli Pehli Baar Mohabbat Ki Hai" from Sirf Tum (1999). The album was launched at Hotel Ashok. The audio rights for the film was purchased by Anand Audio for ₹9 lakh. The company reportedly earned 113 times their investment, making ₹8 crore through sales. It was also reported to have collected more than ₹3 crore in cassette sales of the film's soundtrack album.

Track listing
| No. | Title | Singer(s) | Length |
|---|---|---|---|
| 1. | "Premachandrama" | Rajesh Krishnan | 4:32 |
| 2. | "Namma Maneyalli" | S. P. Balasubrahmanyam, Chithra, Rajesh Krishnan | 4:41 |
| 3. | "Mysoru Mallige" | Rajesh Krishnan, Chithra | 4:01 |
| 4. | "Premachandrama" | S. P. Balasubrahmanyam | 4:23 |
| 5. | "Sree Gandhada Gombe" | Chithra, Rajesh Krishnan | 5:28 |
| 6. | "O Maina O Maina" | Chithra, Rajesh Krishnan | 5:35 |
| 7. | "Bana Chandrama" | Chithra | 1:57 |
| 8. | "Navile Pancharangi" | Nanditha, Devan Ekambaram | 4:10 |
| Total length: | | | 34:47 |

== Reception ==
The film opened to positive reviews from critics and media. Vishnuvardhan's acting and music by Rajesh Ramnath were appreciated. Chitraloka wrote "It is a treat to watch for the family audience. Leave aside that this film is a remake of a Tamil film ‘Vannatha Polai’. The subject is good the making is perfect, the artist contribution is remarkable and Kalyan haunts you with lovely lyrics. Added attraction is immaculately mixed sentiments. You have comedy at regular intervals and take you from all worries". Online Bangalore wrote "This heavily story-laden movie is filled with family sentiments. Sometimes they even look highly dramatic and unrealistic". Go4i wrote "In all, Yajamana is an above average film". Sify wrote "The original tamil film however was inspired from the Hindi film Hum Aapke Hain Kaun. Anyway it is a wholesome entertainer for the whole family".

== Box office ==
The film became an all-time blockbuster with a reported collection of around ₹16-₹17 crores. It went on to create many records. The film completed 100-day runs in 130 main centres, 25 weeks in 51 main centres, 35 weeks in 42 centres and one year in 4 main centres including Apsara theatre in Hubli and Shankar theatre in Chitradurga. The film's silver jubilee function was held at Kanteerava Studios.
