= Jai Vijayam =

Indian Tamil-language suspense thriller film

- Release poster
- Directed by: Jai Akash
- Written by: Jai Akash
- Produced by: Jai Akash
- Starring: Jai Akash; Akshaya Kandamuthan; Atchaya Ray
- Cinematography: Pal Pandi
- Edited by: Azhagar Manikandan
- Music by: Sathish Kumar Srinivasakumar
- Production company: Jaiakash Films
- Distributed by: A Cube Movies App
- Release date: 29 December 2023
- Country: India
- Language: Tamil

Jai Vijayam (transl. Hail victory!) is a 2023 Indian Tamil-language suspense thriller film written, produced and directed by Jai Akash under the banner Jaiakash Films. The film stars himself and Akshaya Kandamuthan in the lead roles.

== Cast ==
- Jai Akash as Jai
- Akshaya Kandamuthan
- Atchaya Ray
- Michael Augustine
- ACP Rajendran

== Reception ==
Maalai Malar critic appreciated the film and Dina Thanthi critic gave a mixed review.
