= Radha Bharathi =

Indian film director

- Occupation: Director

Radha Bharathi is an Indian film director who has worked on Tamil and Kannada language films. He was active in the early 1990s and worked on two high-profile films featuring actor Prashanth, and has since worked on a few low budget projects.

== Career ==
Radha Bharathi made his directorial debut with Vaigasi Poranthachu (1990) and continued to make village-centric action films in the early 1990s, collaborating with Saravanan for back-to-back ventures. He then made another film with Prashanth, Kizhakke Varum Paattu (1993), before working in films as a script and story writer rather than being a director. He re-emerged in 2000 by helming the Kannada film Yajamana alongside Sheshadri, before making Kaatrullavarai (2005), a romantic film with Jai Akash in the lead.

Radha Bharathi made a comeback to Tamil films with Nanbargal Narpani Mandram (2015), a comedy featuring newcomers, which had a low profile release in May 2015.

== Filmography ==
Director

| Year | Film | Notes |
|---|---|---|
| 1990 | Vaigasi Poranthachu | |
| 1991 | Vaidehi Vanthachu | |
| 1993 | Akkarai Cheemayile | |
| 1993 | Kizhakke Varum Paattu | |
| 2000 | Yajamana | Kannada film |
| 2005 | Kaatrullavarai | |
| 2015 | Nanbargal Narpani Mandram | |

Writer

- Thangathin Thangam (1990; story)
- Periya Idathu Pillai (1990)
