= Gambeeram =

- Poster
- Directed by: Suresh
- Written by: Suresh
- Produced by: S. S. Durai Raj
- Starring: R. Sarathkumar; Laila; Pranathi
- Cinematography: Y. N. Murali
- Edited by: V. T. Vijayan
- Music by: Mani Sharma
- Production company: Mass Movie Makers
- Release date: 5 March 2004
- Running time: 160 minutes
- Country: India
- Language: Tamil
- Budget: ₹3 crore

Gambeeram (transl. Bravery) is a 2004 Indian Tamil-language action film written and directed by Suresh. The film, starring R. Sarathkumar and Laila, with Vadivelu, Pranathi and Tanikella Bharani in supporting roles, became an average grosser.

== Plot ==
Muthusamy is a daring police inspector whose wife Saroja, dies after giving birth to a baby girl. He came across a political gangster Rajendran, who had made an attempt on the Chief Minister's life. Years later, Muthusamy is promoted as Assistant Commissioner of Police in Chennai, where Rajendran goes on to become a Union Minister. The rest is how Muthusamy manages to bring to book, the Rajendran and those having a nexus with him.

== Cast ==
- R. Sarathkumar as ACP R. Muthusamy
- Laila as Vijayalakshmi
- Vadivelu as PC Oomathurai
- Pranathi in dual roles as:
  - Saroja, Muthusamy's wife
  - Adult Krithika (cameo appearance)
    - Manishajith as young Krithika
- Tanikella Bharani as Minister Rajendran
- Ravichandran as Minister Mathiazhagan (cameo appearance)
- Peeli Sivam
- Sethu Vinayagam as Businessman
- Manikka Vinayagam as K. Manibharathi
- Pandu as Rajendran's assistant
- Jasper as Naaga
- Bayilvan Ranganathan
- Singamuthu as Police officer
- Vengal Rao as Punjabi
- Thalapathy Dinesh as Police inspector

== Soundtrack ==
The soundtrack was composed by Mani Sharma.

Song	Singers	Lyrics
"Naanaga Naan"	Sujatha, Vijay Yesudas	Kabilan
"Oru Chinna Vennila"	Kalpana Raghavendar	Kabilan
"Kannin Maniye"	S. P. Balasubrahmanyam, Baby Vaishali	Pa. Vijay
"Sembaruthipoove"	Srinivas, Ganga	Pa. Vijay
"Sambalkadu"	Sangeetha	Pa. Vijay

== Reception ==
Sify wrote, "It is an out and out Sarath Kumar film as he dominates the film till the end. In action scenes he flexes his muscles and fights with a new villain Jasper (who is 165 kg!), and looks awesome. Laila has nothing much to do other than speak in her shrieky dubbed voice and sing duets with the hero. New girl Pranathi is promising, while Vadivelu's comedy does an interesting sideshow as a dumb cop. Suresh tries to make a racy cop story, which lacks a strong screenplay. The music of Mani Sharma is nothing great". Malathi Rangarajan of The Hindu wrote, ""Gambeeram" offers a solid role for Sarathkumar. With commendable underplay and agile action Sarath does justice to the job on hand. Laila's scared, vulnerable look suits her to perfection. And debutant Pranathi's sparkling eyes help her make an impression as Sarath's wife Saroja. This is another comedy track in which Vadivelu evokes some healthy laughter. The new `villain' Thanikala Bharani and that hulk of a fighter (Jasper) are just stereotypes. Manisharma's re-recording has never believed in mellowed sound. True to its name, "Gambeeram" looks majestic, dignified and commanding in every frame".

Cinesouth wrote "The story doesn’t sem [sic] to proceed towards a fixed destination. Villains come and go in bits and pieces. This has lessened the involvement in the film. And, since these villains are committing their atrocities on characters that the audience is not familiar with, the impact is lost". Malini Mannath of Chennai Online wrote "It must be admitted that with his well-toned physique, Sharat Kumar does cut a handsome figure as the hardened cop. Pranathi's (from Malayalam films) natural sweet disposition impresses, she playing the ACP's wife. Laila gives more comic relief than Vadivelu as the timid constable holding a torch for the ACP. The final twist in the tale is appreciable". K. N. Vijiyan of New Straits Times called it a "good treat for those who love Sarath Kumar and police stories". Deccan Herald wrote "There have been similar films before like Khakka Khakka. But Gambeeram is an entertainer with songs, glamour and stunts".
