= Gorintaku (2008 film) =

2008 film by V. R. Prathap

- Directed by: V. R. Prathap
- Written by: Sai Prakash
- Produced by: R. B. Choudary (presenter); N.V. Prasad; Paras Jain
- Starring: Rajasekhar; Meera Jasmine; Arthi Agarwal; Akash
- Music by: S. A. Rajkumar
- Production company: Megaa Super Good Films
- Distributed by: Super Good Films
- Release date: 4 July 2008
- Country: India
- Language: Telugu
- Box office: ₹8 crore distributors' share

Gorintaku is a 2008 Indian Telugu-language melodrama film directed by V. R. Prathap, starring Rajasekhar, Meera Jasmine, Aarthi Agarwal, and Akash in the lead roles. The film was a remake of the successful Kannada movie Anna Thangi, starring Shiva Rajkumar. The music was composed by S. A. Rajkumar. The film was released on 4 July 2008 and was a commercial success. It was dubbed, partially reshot, and released in Tamil as Maruthani on 10 September 2010 with an additional comedy track of Mayilswamy and Aarthi.

== Plot ==
Ashok (Rajasekhar) and Lakshmi (Meera Jasmine) are siblings, and their father, Sarvarayudu (Rajasekhar), who was a landlord of the village, and mother (Sujitha) die during their childhood. Ashok and Lakshmi become inseparable. Lakshmi falls in love with Akash (Akash) but makes it clear that she would love or marry him only with the blessings and acceptance of her brother, which he approves. Ashok marries Nandini (Aarthi Agarwal) on the same day. After their marriage, Aakash and Lakshmi lead a happy life, along with Akash's cousins and sisters-in-law. In a gap of seven years, Lakshmi has two daughters and a son. Nandini also becomes pregnant but suffers a miscarriage due to the intervention of one Kantham (Hema Choudhary) who stays with her claiming to be her aunt. As Nandini's uterus was removed, Ashok turned childless. To please him, Akash and Lakshmi bring their children to cajole him. By the time Akash returns to their house, his cousins cheat him and swindle the entire property, and he gets jailed in a cheque bounce case. As a result, Lakshmi and her children turn into orphans. With Kantham's advice, Nandini throws Lakshmi out of the house and warns her not to try to meet her brother. Now with no way to save her husband and family, Lakshmi and her children commit suicide. Upon learning this, Ashok also dies, proving they are inseparable even in death.

== Cast ==
- Rajasekhar as in a dual role as Ashok (son) & Sarvarayudu (father)
- Aarthi Agarwal as Nandini
- Meera Jasmine as Lakshmi, Ashok's sister
- Akash as Akash
- Hema Choudhary as Suryakantham
- Telangana Shakuntala as Shakuntala, Ashok's grandmother
- Master Nidheesh as Lakshmi's son
- Sujitha as Sneha, Sarvarayudu's wife
- Janaki Sabesh as Annapurna, Nandini and Lakshmi's mother
- Nassar as Chakrapani, Nandini and Lakshmi's father
- Paruchuri Venkateswara Rao as Venkatachalam, Ashok's father
- Chandra Mohan as Chandram, Sarvarayudu's father
- Suhasini Maniratnam as Snehalatha, Ashok's mother
- Sivaji Raja as Sivaji, Ashok's friend
- Venu Madhav as Venu
- Brahmaji as Basava
- Ravi Prakash as Ravi Radha Krishna Simha
- Banerjee as Banerjee
- Jeeva as Narayana
- Uttej
- Surya

== Soundtrack ==
The music for the film was composed by S. A. Rajkumar, who retained three songs from the original version (which was composed by Hamsalekha): "Dum Dum Dum" as " Dum Dum Dum"; "Anna Thangiyara" as "Anna Chellela"; and "Anna Nammonadharu" as "Yeradilo Koila".

No.	Title	Singer(s)	Length
1.	"Anna Chellela"	K. S. Chithra, S. P. Balasubrahmanyam
2.	"Dum Dum Dum"	Udit Narayan, Gopika Poornima
3.	"Yeradilo Koila"	K. S. Chithra
4.	"Chellaye Illali"	Gopika Poornima
5.	"Rajugari Thotalona"	Mano, Sujatha Mohan, Suneetha
6.	"Karuna Kuriyu"	Mano, Priya Prakash, Hema
7.	"Yelo Yelo Illalai"	Tippu, Roshini
