= Sarada Saradaga =

- DVD cover
- Directed by: S. V. Krishna Reddy
- Screenplay by: S. V. Krishna Reddy
- Story by: Janardhana Maharshi
- Produced by: G. V. Prasad
- Starring: Rajendra Prasad; Srikanth; Sindhu Tolani; Siva Balaji; Ruthika; Pranathi
- Cinematography: Arun Kumar
- Edited by: K. V. Krishna Reddy
- Music by: S. V. Krishna Reddy
- Production company: Damini Entertainments Pvt Ltd
- Release date: 27 January 2006
- Running time: 117 mins
- Country: India
- Language: Telugu

Sarada Saradaga (transl. Funny funnily) is a 2006 Telugu-language comedy film, produced by G.V.Prasad on Damini Entertainments Pvt Ltd banner and directed by S. V. Krishna Reddy, who also provided film's screenplay and music. The film's star cast includes Rajendra Prasad, Srikanth, Sindhu Tolani, Siva Balaji, Ruthika, and Pranathi. The film was reported to be similar to the Hindi film Maine Pyaar Kyun Kiya? (2005).

== Cast ==
- Rajendra Prasad as Balaraju
- Srikanth as Raghava
- Sindhu Tolani as Lavanya
- Siva Balaji as Prem
- Ruthika as Sundari, Balraju's Wife
- Pranathi as Siri / Maaya
- Brahmanandam as Kona
- Ali as Ali
- Sunil as Sunil
- M. S. Narayana as Public / Blade Babji
- Dharmavarapu Subramanyam as Police Inspector
- Giri Babu as Prem's father
- A.V.S as Lavanya's father
- Venu Madhav as Waiter
- Gundu Hanumantha Rao as Constable
- Jhansi as Balaraju's servant
- Jayalalita as Lavanya's mother
- Kalpana
- Ammudi
- Nandana
- Master Sandeep as Balaraju's son

== Production ==
The muhurat took place on 12 October 2005 at Padmalaya Studios coinciding with Vijayadashami.

== Soundtrack ==
Sarada Saradaga

Film score by S. V. Krishna Reddy
- Released: 2005
- Genre: Soundtrack
- Length: 29:50
- Label: Supreme Music
- Producer: S. V. Krishna Reddy

S. V. Krishna Reddy chronology
Hungama (2005)	Sarada Saradaga (2005)	Maayajaalam (2006)

The music was composed by S. V. Krishna Reddy. Music released on Supreme Music Company. The audio release function took place at a Holiday Inn hotel on 17 December 2005. Later, the audio was acquired by a private music label company 'XTRA Audio'.

No.	Title	Lyrics	Singer(s)	Length
1.	"Dont Worry, Be Happy"	Chandrabose	Jassie Gift	4:42
2.	"Malle Malle"	Chandrabose	Kailash Kher, Sayanora Philip	4:46
3.	"Yenno Janma Janmalanunchi"	Bhuvana Chandra	Kunal Ganjawala, Vasundhara Das	5:19
4.	"Nuvvu Naaku"	Bhuvana Chandra	Sriram Parthasarathy, Sumangali	5:23
5.	"Rajasa Munna Ranganayaka"	Bhuvana Chandra	Madhu Balakrishnan, Chitra	5:04
6.	"Sye Sye Saradaga"	Vishwa	Anushka Manchanda	4:36
Total length:				29:50

== Reception ==
Jeevi of Idlebrain.com rated the film 2/5 stars and wrote, "On a whole, Sarada Saradaga which is supposed to be a comedy flick, fails to entertain".
