= Pranathi =

Indian film actress (born 1987)

- Born: 19 April 1987 (age 39)
- Occupations: Model; actress
- Years active: 2001–2005
- Spouse: Dr. Sivarajan (m. 2011)
- Father: Jose

Pranathi is an Indian former model and actress, who appeared in Malayalam, Tamil and Kannada-language films.

== Personal life ==
Pranathi's father is Malayalam actor Jose. She is married to Dr. Sivarajan in September 2011

== Career ==
Pranathi began her career as a model. She won the Miss Beautiful Hair and Miss Best of Kochi titles at the Miss South India beauty pageant contest held in 2001. Upon completion of her schooling at the St. George's Homes, a residential school in Ooty, she began her film career.

Pranathi made her acting debut alongside Bharath in Jayaraj's successful Malayalam film 4 the People (2004). She won critical acclaim for her performance in the Tamil film Gambeeram (2004). In 2005, during the making of Gurudeva and Kaatrullavarai alongside actor Jai Akash, reports suggested that the pair were dating. Also during 2005, her most prolific year, she appeared in a Kannada film titled Santhosha as a college student opposite newcomer Siddharth as well as in the Sathyaraj-starrer Vanakkam Thalaiva.

She quit the film industry soon after failing to garner further offers.

== Filmography ==
| Year | Film | Role | Language | Notes |
|---|---|---|---|---|
| 2004 | 4 the People | Teena | Malayalam | |
| 2004 | Gambeeram | Saroja | Tamil | |
| 2005 | Gurudeva | Deva | Tamil | |
| 2005 | Guru | Deva | Telugu | |
| 2005 | Santhosha | Ramya | Kannada | |
| 2005 | Kaatrullavarai | Narmadha | Tamil | |
| 2005 | Vanakkam Thalaiva | Ramya | Tamil | |
| 2006 | Sarada Saradaga | Siri / Maaya | Telugu | |
| 2006 | Beats | | Telugu | |
