= Three Roses =

- DVD cover
- Directed by: Parameswar
- Written by: K. Jayapandian; C. B. Anand; Punitha Prakash (dialogues)
- Screenplay by: Parameshwar
- Story by: Infocus
- Produced by: Usha Rani; Vasu
- Starring: Rambha; Jyothika; Laila
- Cinematography: Rajarajan; Nirav
- Edited by: V. T. Vijayan
- Music by: Karthik Raja
- Production companies: Infocus Ltd; Parijay Creators
- Release date: 27 September 2003
- Country: India
- Language: Tamil

3 Roses is a 2003 Indian Tamil-language action-adventure film directed by Parameswar, starring Rambha, Jyothika and Laila. The film features Vivek, Urvashi, Rekha Vedavyas in supporting roles. Karthik Raja composed the music and Rajarajan handled the camera. It was released on 27 September 2003, and became a box office failure.

== Plot ==
Charu, Nandhu and Pooja are friends who study music abroad. On their return they become embroiled in a case involving their friend Asha, who travels with her lover to Chennai from Dubai on a false passport. She is imprisoned and the three girls garner support for Asha who would be executed if sent back to Dubai.

== Cast ==
- Rambha as Charulatha
- Jyothika as Pooja
- Laila as Nandhini aka Nandhu
- Vivek as Shankar / Bala Mani Bharathi
- Urvashi as Chandralekha
- Rekha Vedavyas as Asha
- Vijay Adhiraj as Saleem
- Rajan P. Dev as a politician
- Vijay Krishnaraj
- Manobala
- Madhan Bob
- Meera Krishnan
- Mohan Vaidya
- Anu Mohan
- Mahadevan
- Sampath Ram as Police officer
- Besant Ravi
- Govinda as himself (guest appearance in the song "Meiyanadha")
- Abbas as Charulatha's fiancé (guest appearance)
- Akash as Akash (guest appearance)
- Mumtaj as herself (guest appearance)

== Production ==
Actress Rambha along with her brother, Srinivas alias Vasu, agreed to produce a Tamil film along the lines of the American franchise, Charlie's Angels, and hired leading actresses Jyothika and Laila to appear in key roles alongside her. Parameswaran was signed as director. Initially the producers had approached Simran to play one of the lead roles, but she rejected the opportunity; in one interview she cited scheduling conflicts, but in another, attributed it to its similarities to Charlie's Angels. The film began its first schedule on 21 November 2001 in Chennai with the producers also revealing they managed to get Hindi actor Govinda to make a guest appearance. He shot for a song in Chennai. Arjun agreed to play a supporting role in the film, but later left.

During the shoot of the film, there was reportedly a clash of opinions between Jyothika and Laila in January 2002, with the pair having to be restrained by Rambha. Problems continued as the careers of Laila and Rambha began to peter out, prompting distributors to back away from the film, leading to further delays. Prior to release, the team of the film collaborated with prominent tea brand, 3 Roses, for their media campaign.

== Soundtrack ==
Soundtrack was composed by Karthik Raja and lyrics were by Paarthi Bhaskar. The film marked the full-fledged singing debut of Shweta Mohan.

Track listing
No.	Title	Singer(s)	Length
1.	"Meiyanadha"	Shweta Mohan, Karthik
2.	"Oh Oh Sexy"	Rohini, Bhavatharini
3.	"Oh Dil Se Pyar"	Sujatha, Karthik
4.	"Anbal Unnai"	Bhavatharini, Annupamaa, Febi Mani
5.	"Sevvai Desam"	Karthik, Shweta Mohan

== Critical reception ==
Malathi Rangarajan of The Hindu said that "a frivolous storyline, a lackadaisical approach to the screenplay and inept direction mar Three Roses", adding that "after all the hype and hoopla, speculation and delay, arrives Three Roses, and ironically it is focus that the film lacks." Visual Dasan of Kalki felt this version of Charlie's Angels lacked the art direction, graphics and background score of the original. Dasan also panned the music but praised Vivek's humour and added the first half which wobbles like a pit, gains speed after Dalal Azmi's love affair comes up. Malini Mannath of Chennai Online wrote, "The trio lack the chutzpah to carry the film on their shoulders. Rambha is no more the oomph girl she once was, Laila never had it, and Jyotika for all her sincerity is clearly out of place in the entire film".

== Post-release ==
Rambha suffered losses from the film and fell heavily into debt, being forced to sell her property. A cheque bounce case was filed against her as she borrowed a large sum of money but failed to return it. The failure of the film also led to Rambha taking an extended break from Tamil language films. Vasu went on to produce Rambha's thriller film Vidiyum Varai Kaathiru. However, the film never saw a release date.
