= Don Chera =

- Directed by: K. S. Saravanan
- Screenplay by: K. S. Saravanan
- Story by: Mahesh Manjrekar
- Produced by: N. T. Sakthi Pandiyan
- Starring: Ranjith; Sujibala
- Cinematography: Sivamanoharan
- Edited by: R. T. Annadurai
- Music by: Prince G.
- Production company: Sivasankaralaya
- Release date: 2 June 2006
- Running time: 140 minutes
- Country: India
- Language: Tamil

Don Chera is a 2006 Indian Tamil language action crime film directed by K. S. Saravanan. The film stars Ranjith and Sujibala, with Chandrasekhar, Meera Krishnan, S. Rajasekar, R. N. R. Manohar, Ilavarasu, and Velmurugan playing supporting roles. The film, produced by N. T. Sakthi Pandiyan, was released on 2 June 2006. It is a remake of the Hindi film Vaastav: The Reality (1999).

== Plot ==
The jobless and carefree young man Cheran (Ranjith) lives with his parents Sundaram (Chandrasekhar) and Dhanalakshmi (Meera Krishnan) and his elder brother Ravi (Ramesh Maali). His father wants Cheran to find a job, and Cheran sets up a roadside street food business along with his friends. One day, an exchange with a customer escalates, and Cheran has to kill him to save his friend Kutty (Velmurugan). The killed customer turns out to be the brother of the rowdy gangster Ezhumalai (V. K. R. Ragu).

Cheran and Kutty have no choice but to hide from the police, and they then meet Ezhumalai's archenemy "Royapuram" Bava (R. N. R. Manohar), who promises to offer them protection. Kamal Bhai (S. Rajasekar), a pious man who solves underworld crime issue, arranges a meeting between Cheran and Ezhumalai. During the meeting, Ezhumalai, who is full of rage, tries to kill Cheran, but Cheran takes a gun and shoots him dead. Bava then hires Cheran and Kutty as his henchmen. Cheran starts drinking alcohol, gets addicted to drugs, and spends his nights in a brothel, where he meets the young prostitute Geetha (Sujibala). Cheran slowly begins to rise in Bava's ranks. When Bava gets killed by his enemies, a vengeful Cheran kills them all. Cheran becomes the most dangerous don of Chennai, and he is now called Don Chera by his henchmen. In the meantime, Cheran and Geetha fall in love with each other, and they get married with the blessings of their parents.

Cheran then starts working for Home Minister Perumal (Ilavarasu), who orders him to kill innocent people. Thereafter, Geetha gives birth to a baby boy. Cheran's family advises him to leave the criminal underworld and surrender to the police, but he refuses. Perumal is soon under serious pressure from the public and government. They suspect him of employing Cheran. He orders the police to encounter Cheran. Perumal's henchmen and Kutty get killed in an encounter. Cheran, who is now on the run, must protect his family as they too are in danger. Kamal Bhai arranges a meeting between Cheran and Perumal; Cheran kills Perumal as he would spoil others' lives like his in the future. In the process, Kamal Bhai is killed by the police, and Cheran escapes from the place. Cheran returns to his home and asks his family to save him. Cheran, who could not sleep peacefully since he entered the criminal underworld, begs his mother to make him sleep, and Dhanalakshmi shoots him dead.

The film ends with the family fulfilling the annual rites of Cheran on the Chennai beach and with Dhanalakshmi explaining all that happened to her young grandson.

== Cast ==
- Ranjith as Cheran (Don Chera)
- Sujibala as Geetha
- Chandrasekhar as Sundaram, Cheran's father
- Meera Krishnan as Dhanalakshmi, Cheran's mother
- S. Rajasekar as Kamal Bhai
- R. N. R. Manohar as "Royapuram" Bava
- Ilavarasu as Perumal
- Velmurugan as Kutty
- Ramesh Maali as Ravi
- V. K. R. Ragu as Ezhumalai
- Vasu Vikram
- Pasi Sathya as Kutty's mother
- Tirupur Ramasamy as Kutty's father
- Bava Lakshmanan as Murugesan
- P. Soundara Rajan as Kunji Chetta
- Jayashree as Sindhu
- Sathya as Sathya
- Shanthi Ganesh
- Seetha Ravishankar
- Nisha
- Balendran

== Production ==
K. S. Saravanan, who had worked with various directors, including Keyaar and Vikraman, made his directorial debut with Don Chera under the banner of Sivasankaralaya. Ranjith was selected to play the title role, while Sujibala was chosen to play his love interest. Sivamanoharan took in charge of cinematography while newcomer Prince G. who worked with Harris Jayaraj as his keyboard player, had taken care of the music and editing was done by R. T. Annadurai. The film was launched at AVM Studios.

== Soundtrack ==
Don Chera

Soundtrack album by Prince G.
- Released: 2006
- Recorded: 2006
- Genre: Feature film soundtrack
- Length: 22:45
- Producer: Prince G.

The film score and the soundtrack were composed by Prince G.. The soundtrack features 5 tracks.

All lyrics are written by Snehan.

Tracklist
No.	Title	Singer(s)	Length
1.	"Appadi Paar Ippadi"	Anuradha Sriram	4:32
2.	"Vennila Vennila (duet)"	Prasanna Rao, Kanchana	5:09
3.	"Vennila Vennila (solo)"	Prasanna Rao	5:09
4.	"Aathuichodi Paadikittu"	Kanchana	4:05
5.	"Chinnapaya Naa Chinnaponnu"	Kanchana	3:50
Total length:			22:45

== Release ==
Initially, the film had its release date fixed on 26 May 2006, but it was postponed to 2 June 2006 to avoid a clash with Selvaraghavan's gangster film Pudhupettai (2006).

A reviewer praised Ranjith's acting and gave the film a mixed review. Malini Mannath of Chennai Online wrote "It's yet again a predictable scenario of a simple youth turning into a gangster by force of circumstances. With nothing new or exciting in the script or style of presentation, and with the cast too turning in lacklustre performances, it's sheer monotony sitting through the film. The attempt to weave in sentiment only creates more lagging moments, the hero's monologues making it more wearisome".
