= Surya Parvai =

1999 film by Sakthi Paramesh

- DVD cover
- Directed by: Jagan
- Written by: Jagan
- Produced by: Sreenivas Prasad
- Starring: Arjun; Pooja
- Cinematography: K. Prasad
- Edited by: Sai Prasad; Babu Raj
- Music by: S. A. Rajkumar
- Production company: Moturi Creations
- Release date: 14 January 1999
- Running time: 140 minutes
- Country: India
- Language: Tamil

Surya Parvai (Tamil: சூர்ய பார்வை, transl. 'Solar Vision') is a 1999 Indian Tamil-language action crime film directed by Jagan in his directorial debut. The film stars Arjun and newcomer Pooja. It was released on 14 January 1999. The film is an unauthorised remake of the 1994 French film Léon: The Professional.

== Plot ==
Vijay is a hitman who works for Sundaramoorthy. He kills anybody for a price, other than women and children, and lives alone in an apartment. Pooja, a young girl, studies in a boarding school and comes to her father's house for the holiday. Between her abusive father, selfish stepmother and an arrogant step-aunt, Pooja feels rather badly, but she treasures her lovely little brother Dinesh. Pooja tries to befriend Vijay, but Vijay is not interested. Her father is a drug smuggler. One day, Jayanth, the director of the Narcotics Control Bureau who secretly runs a drug empire, kills Pooja's family, including her brother. Vijay decides to accommodate Pooja, and Pooja compels him to teach her his skills as a hitman. What transpires later forms the crux of the story.

== Cast ==
- Arjun as Vijay
- Pooja Priyanka as Pooja
- Raghuvaran as Jayanth
- Vijayakumar as Narayanan
- Radha Ravi as Sundaramoorthy
- Goundamani as Raj Bharath / Nattamai
- Senthil as Pichai Perumal / Sundaram
- Chinni Jayanth as Inspector Pichai Perumal
- Manjula Vijayakumar as Lakshmi
- Mahanadi Dinesh as Dinesh
- Sindhu as Sindhu
- Prasad Babu as Prakash, Pooja's father
- Alphonsa as Sheela
- S. N. Lakshmi as Lakshmi's mother
- Naren as Kannan, Jayanth's henchman
- Master Mahendran as Vijay (child)
- Vimalraj as George
- Rani
- Kavitha Sree
- Jaya Mani
- K. K. Soundar
- Kalaignanam (guest appearance)

== Production ==
The film's story and screenplay were written by Arjun's assistant Jagan, who also made his directorial debut. Pooja Priyanka, daughter of actress Subhashini and niece of Jayasudha, was cast in the lead role opposite Arjun, while she was still at school.

== Soundtrack ==
The soundtrack was composed by S. A. Rajkumar, with lyrics written by Palani Bharathi.

Track listing
No.	Title	Singer(s)	Length
1.	"Boom Blast It"	Sowmya Raoh	4:24
2.	"Ganapathi Thatha"	Harini, G. V. Prakash Kumar	4:02
3.	"Hey Man"	Annupamaa	4:57
4.	"Kadhavai Thirakkum" (Male)	P. Unnikrishnan	3:52
5.	"Kadhavai Thirakkum" (Female)	K. S. Chithra	3:52
6.	"Panirendu Vayasula"	Anuradha Sriram, Malgudi Subha	4:45
7.	"Thotathu Pookkal"	S. P. Balasubrahmanyam, S. P. B. Pallavi	4:12
Total length:			30:04

== Critical reception ==
Reviewing the Telugu version Hello Friend, a critic from The Hindu wrote, "Though the storyline is thin, the chock-n-block fisticuffs and slam-bang shoot-outs, along with the riveting performances by Arjun and Raghuvaran, keep you hooked onto a cinematic roller-coaster action ride. By hardly leaving any room for sentiment, it is quite obvious that Director Jagan seems to be influenced by the Hollywood action flicks. Even the action scenes are canned in that typical Hollywood style." Reviewing the same version, Griddaluru Gopalrao of Zamin Ryot wrote that the director Jagan enhanced the scope of the story with action scenes and song scenes to make the film appealing to the audience. The Tamil film was released in Malaysia under the title Kaavalan (transl. Bodyguard). K. N. Vijiyan of New Straits Times, reviewing this version, called the story subpar but believed it would satisfy Arjun fans.
