= Periya Idathu Pillai =

- Poster
- Directed by: Senthilnathan
- Written by: Radha Bharathi; Prasanna (dialogues)
- Story by: Anthony
- Produced by: K. Balakumar; Manikavasagam; M. C. Natarajan
- Starring: Arjun; Kanaka
- Cinematography: M. Kesavan
- Edited by: L. Kesavan
- Music by: Chandrabose
- Production company: Jubilee Films
- Release date: 2 June 1990
- Country: India
- Language: Tamil

Periya Idathu Pillai (transl. The boy from a rich household) is a 1990 Indian Tamil-language film, written and directed by Senthilnathan. The film stars Arjun and Kanaka. It was released on 2 June 1990.

== Cast ==
- Arjun as Vijay
- Kanaka as Geetha
- C. R. Vijayakumari
- Goundamani
- Senthil
- Anandaraj
- Dipika Chikhlia
- Rajinikanth as himself (guest appearance)

== Soundtrack ==
The soundtrack was composed by Chandrabose, with lyrics by Vaali.

Track listing
No.	Title	Singer(s)	Length
1.	"Manasula"	K. J. Yesudas, P. Susheela	4:59
2.	"Veikaporu"	S. P. Balasubrahmanyam	3:58
3.	"Unnai Potri"	S. P. Balasubrahmanyam, S. P. Sailaja	4:31
4.	"Villupaatu"	Malaysia Vasudevan
5.	"Vaigai"	Malaysia Vasudevan, T. L. Maharajan	4:35
6.	"Nadaswarangal"	Mano, S. Janaki	4:29

== Reception ==
P. S. S. of Kalki wrote that there is a lot to like, but the glaring artificialities and over-sentiment combine to make it a frustrating waste of something. Dina Thanthi wrote, in a response to a scene where Anandaraj's character rapes Dipika Chikhlia's character, "ராவணனால் கெடுக்க முடியாத சீதையை ஆனந்த்ராஜ் கெடுத்தார்" (transl. Anandaraj spoiled Sita who could not be spoiled by Ravana), referring to Chikhlia's character from the TV series Ramayan.
