= Boys (2003 film) =

2003 Indian film by Shankar

- Poster
- Directed by: Shankar
- Screenplay by: Shankar
- Story by: Senusha Eshan
- Dialogues by: Sujatha
- Produced by: A. M. Rathnam
- Starring: Siddharth; Bharath; S. Thaman; Manikandan; Nakul; Genelia
- Cinematography: Ravi K. Chandran; K.V. Anand (1 song); V. Manikandan (1 song)
- Edited by: V. T. Vijayan
- Music by: A. R. Rahman; Pravin Mani (uncredited, 1 song)
- Production company: Sri Surya Movies
- Release date: 29 August 2003
- Running time: 177 minutes
- Country: India
- Language: Tamil

Boys is a 2003 Indian Tamil-language coming-of-age musical film directed by Shankar. It stars Siddharth, Bharath, S. Thaman (credited as Sai), Manikandan, Nakkhul and Genelia (credited as Harini), in her debut. The score and soundtrack are composed by A. R. Rahman. The story revolves around six youngsters, who experience the downfalls of adolescent life. The film was released on 29 August 2003.

The film landed in controversy for its bold scenes and depiction of scenes in a song. The Tamil Nadu women's organisation held protests against the film and the film flopped during its initial run. However, in years, the film became a cult classic and is widely considered one of the best coming-of-age movies made. The film depicts the fashion, music and lifestyle favoured by the youth in the early 2000s.

== Plot ==
Five college friends – Munna, Babu Kalyanam "Bob Gally", Juju, Krishna, and Kumar – are young adults who engage in reckless behaviour – smoking, drinking, flirting with girls, etc. – much to their parents' chagrin. The friends befriend a middle-aged man named Mangalam, and meet Harini and her friends. While Munna's parents are out of town, they hire a prostitute Rani, but all of them back out at the last moment. Munna and Harini eventually start a romantic relationship that infuriates their parents. When the parents collectively decide to separate the group, Munna and Harini decide to elope. With support from Mangalam and the boys, Munna and Harini hastily get married in Tirupati without their parents' consent. Consequently, a confrontation leads the parents to expel the boys and Harini, who vow to succeed independently.

The boys and Harini work odd jobs to earn money, and eventually form a band called Boys to fund their education. After earning initial success with modern versions of Tamil devotional songs, Boys are investigated and incarcerated under the Prevention of Terrorism Act for naïvely associating with Naxalites and making extremist songs. They are eventually rescued by Mangalam, who proves their innocence through great difficulty. Recognizing their natural talent, Mangalam encourages them to pursue music as a career, and joins them as their manager. Boys work hard to pursue opportunities and secure a contract to record an album with Sony. However, a drunk Krishna reveals to Harini about the boys' earlier encounter with Rani, causing Harini to angrily leave Munna and return to her parents. The boys try to track Rani down to prove they did no wrong. Kumar spots her on a bus but dies after being run over.

Determined to fulfill their contract to Sony, Mangalam and the boys try to persuade Harini’s parents to let her record an album with them. Despite initial disagreement, Harini's parents eventually agree on the condition that Harini and Munna divorce and never see each other again. Munna reluctantly accepts this arrangement for the sake of his friends. Boys soon record and release their album to great success and fame, and even perform live on MTV, dedicating their performance to Kumar. Despite their success, Munna and Harini proceed for their divorce. At the court, however, Mangalam hatches a plan to deliberately make Harini jealous and reconcile her with Munna before their divorce is finalised, which succeeds as Harini furiously and possessively reunites with Munna.

== Cast ==
- Siddharth as Munna
- Genelia as C. Harini
- Bharath as Babu Kalyanam / Bob Gally
- S. Thaman as Krishna
- Manikandan as Kumar
- Nakul as Juju
- Swetha as Sampatha
- Amanda as Ankita
- Sindhuri as Teju
- Reshu as Padma
- Vivek as Mangalam (Sundaram)
- Ravi Prakash as M. Chandra Shekar, Harini's father
- Anita Ratnam as Harini's mother
- A. V. Ramanan as Swaminathan, Munna's father
- Janaki Sabesh as Renuka, Munna's mother
- Ilavarasu as Kumar's father
- Kalairani as Kumar's mother
- Subhashini as Bob Gally's mother
- Raviraj as Juju's father
- K. B. Mohan as Krishna's father
- Kamal Chopra
- Bhuvaneswari as Rani
- Chitti Babu as Hari
- Manobala as Ajay
- Delhi Kumar as a judge
- Solomon Pappaiah as a judge
- A. C. Murali Mohan
- Suryakanth as 'Pimp' Manickam
- Rajan as Anti-Terrorism Officer
- Senthil as Anna Veri Kannaiyan (guest appearance)
- Hariharan in a cameo appearance as himself
- Blaaze in a cameo appearance as a Music Award Show Host
- SPB as in a cameo appearance as a Music Award Show Host
- Vijay Yesudas as in a cameo appearance as a Music Award Show Host
- Ranjith as in a cameo appearance as a Music Award Show Host

== Production ==
=== Development ===
By early 2002, Shankar had postponed the making of Robot starring Kamal Haasan and Preity Zinta to start a much smaller film titled Boys, intending to cast newcomers. Shankar opted to introduce five debutants to play the lead characters and held auditions in 2002, with over 500 applicants being video tested.

Siddharth had initially worked as an assistant director to Mani Ratnam in Kannathil Muthamittal, and the co-writer of that film, Sujatha was insistent that Siddharth audition for Boys. After consulting with Ratnam, he met Shankar, auditioned, and got the role of Munna. Shankar had seen Bharath at a dance programme, Inspirations at the Music Academy by 'Swingers', and called him to appear in screen tests that included delivering dialogues and dancing before selecting him to do the role of Bob Galy. Bharath was initially earmarked to play the lead role in the film before the team found Siddharth. Sai Srinivas, a percussionist who had worked with leading music composers was cast after a successful audition in which he had to play the drums and went on to help out with the background score. Nakul, brother of actress Devayani, was a second-year college student who was also chosen. His family had sent some pictures of Nakul's elder brother Mayur to Shankar's office and, after seeing Nakul in one of the pictures, Shankar approached him. Manikandan, a visual communications graduate who had featured in Kala master's dance troupe doing stage shows, was also selected. Genelia, who was shooting for the Hindi film Tujhe Meri Kasam, was chosen among 300 girls after Shankar was impressed by her Parker Pen commercial alongside Amitabh Bachchan. Her voice was dubbed by Rathi Arumugam. While finalising the lead cast, Shankar had also approached Shanthanu and Varalaxmi, but their respective fathers, K. Bhagyaraj and R. Sarathkumar, turned down the opportunities.

Ravi K. Chandran was the principal director of photography; he introduced the linking of 62 cameras for the first time and the use of time-freeze technology in Boys. Cinematographers K. V. Anand and V. Manikandan were credited for filming two songs, while directors Gandhi Krishna and Balaji Sakthivel were a part of Shankar's assistant team.

=== Filming ===
Boys was launched at the Kalaivaanar Arangam in Chennai with Rajinikanth attending the event as the chief guest of the function and the new cast was introduced to the media. Filming began later that day, and two days later a teaser trailer of the film was broadcast on television.

The song "Ale Ale" was picturised at the Bridestowe Estate Lavender Farm in Scottsdale, Tasmania, Australia where cinematographer Ravi K. Chandran linked 62 cameras, using a new 'time-freeze' technique with the help of Australian cinematographer Mark Ruff's rig. Mark Kobe, who had been a part of the teams of Godzilla and Independence Day, carried out the computer graphic effects for Boys and created a 3D female to feature in the song "Girlfriend". Another song, "Dating", was shot at a set created by Sabu Cyril on the Chennai seashore where he created a seaside swimming pool, restaurant, water volleyball, and discothèque for the song sequence. For "Boom Boom", Cyril made a set out of waste materials like steel, tin sheets, bottles, used cans of Pepsi, Coca-Cola, Dalda and wood waste to create the backdrop, whilst the actors in the song were dressed by designer Arjun Fazil in matchsticks, film rolls, videotape, and crisps covers. "Maro Maro" was picturised on 500 young dancers at the Jawaharlal Nehru Stadium, Kochi, while for "Secret of Success", the team were given permission to use the MTV logo as the scene saw the band performing at the MTV Awards.

== Soundtrack ==
Boys

Soundtrack album by A. R. Rahman
- Released: 30 June 2002; 15 August 2012 (Hindi)
- Recorded: Panchathan Record Inn
- Genres: Pop, pop rock, dance music, world music
- Labels: Star Music (Tamil); An Ak Audio (Tamil); Aditya Music (Telugu); Pen Music (Hindi)
- Producer: A. R. Rahman

A. R. Rahman chronology
Kannathil Muthamittal (2002)	Boys (2002)	Baba (2002)

The soundtrack, featuring seven songs composed by A. R. Rahman, was launched on 30 June 2002 at Devi Theatre. It was the seventh collaboration of Shankar and Rahman, a combination that is one of the most successful in India. On the song "Girlfriend", Shankar said, "I had told my crew and associates in the beginning itself that we had to think like an 18-year-old as the film is about youth and their desires. So when lyricist Pa.Vijay and Rahman sat together, we wanted a catchy number which the youth can relate to. At 18, every boy dreams of having a girlfriend. Rahman came up with a perfect fast paced peppy tune and Vijayan's lyrics fell into place as it establishes the yearning for a girlfriend. It sets the mood for the film as it appears in the first reel of Boys." The song "Ayyappo" was originally composed by Pravin Mani, but Rahman did the re-recording of the song.

=== Original Tamil track list ===
Track list
No.	Title	Lyrics	Singer(s)	Length
1.	"Girlfriend"	Pa. Vijay	Karthik, Tippu & Timmy	5:00
2.	"Dating"	Pa. Vijay	Blaaze, Vasundhara Das	4:54
3.	"Ale Ale"	Kabilan	Karthik, Chitra Sivaraman	6:26
4.	"Secret of Success"	Vaalee, Blaaze	Lucky Ali, Clinton Cerejo, Blaaze, Vasundhara Das	6:07
5.	"Boom Boom"	Vaalee	Adnan Sami, Sadhana Sargam	5:06
6.	"Maro Maro ("Break The Rules")"	Vaalee	Karthik, George, Kunal Ganjawala, Anupama, Sunitha Sarathy	5:41
7.	"Please Sir"	Vaalee	Kunal Ganjawala, Clinton Cerejo, S. P. B. Charan, Chinmayi	1:58
8.	"Ayyappo"	Vaalee	Karthik, Shankar Mahadevan, Chinmayi	1:32
Total length:				36:52

=== Telugu track list ===
All lyrics are written by A.M. Rathnam & Siva Ganesh.

Track list
No.	Title	Singer(s)	Length
1.	"Padaharu Prayam Lo Na"	Karthik, Tippu & Timmy	5:00
2.	"Dating"	Blaaze & Vasundhara Das	4:54
3.	"Ale Ale"	Karthik & Chitra Sivaraman	6:26
4.	"Sarigame" (Additional lyrics by Blaaze)	Lucky Ali, Clinton Cerejo, Blaaze & Vasundhara Das	6:07
5.	"Boom Boom"	Udit Narayan & Sadhana Sargam	5:06
6.	"Maro Maro ("Break The Rules")"	Karthik, Kunal Ganjawala, George, Anupama & Sunitha Sarathy	5:41
7.	"Please Sir"	Kunal Ganjawala, Clinton Cerejo, SPB Charan & Chinmayi	1:58
Total length:			35:20

=== Hindi track list ===
(Released on 15 August 2012 by Pen Music Ltd.)

All lyrics are written by Abbas Tyrewala.

Track list
No.	Title	Singer(s)	Length
1.	"Girlfriend"	Karthik	5:00
2.	"Dating" (Additional lyrics by Blaaze)	Blaaze & Vasundhara Das	4:54
3.	"Ale Ale"	Shaan & Madhushree	6:28
4.	"Secret of Success" (Additional lyrics by Blaaze)	Shiraz Uppal, Kunal Ganjawala, Blaaze & Vasundhara Das	6:10
5.	"Boom Boom"	Rashid Ali, Sadhana Sargam, Adnan Sami & A. R. Rahman,	5:06
6.	"Maro Maro ("Break The Rules")"	Karthik, Kunal Ganjawala, Anupama & Sunitha Sarathy	5:45
7.	"Please Sir"	Kunal Ganjawala, Clinton Cerejo, SPB Charan & Chinmayi	1:58
Total length:			35:34

=== Critical reception ===
The album was met with positive reviews upon release, but the sales were lagging initially. Star Music, the company which had bought the rights of the soundtrack, was able to sell only 60,000 records in the first week. However, in the following weeks, sales drastically increased and the soundtrack became the best-selling album of the year. Rediff stated, "A R Rahman has helmed the scoring of what is certainly the best of Tamil music this year. Take note of Vaali's lyrics for "Secret of Success" and P. A. Vijay's "Dating". Cinesouth wrote "In total, 'Boys' songs have increased the expectations for the movie more like Shankar's all other earlier movies that have rocked the Box Office. The album is worth the wait and Shankar-Rahman combination still remains a success. 'Boys' seems to be a new big bang theory altogether in the hearts of the music lovers".

== Release ==
The film was released on 29 August 2003. It was also dubbed and released in Telugu with the same title. The Hindi soundtrack of the film was released in 2012, 9 years after its original release. The Hindi dubbed version of the film was released on ZEE5 on 1 March 2021, 17 years after the original release.

=== Reception ===
Siddhu Warrier of Rediff cited that the film "gets enmeshed in an intricate array of sub-plots. And somewhere along the way, the story begins to meander", adding that "college students, especially guys, might watch Boys more than once for the titillating scenes, the non-veg jokes, and, most importantly, the skimpy, transparent clothing sported by the heroine." Guru Subramaniam, also from Rediff stated that "Shankar's overconfidence in selling situations to the audience has failed this time. Many scenes, including the climax, look ordinary without any build-up sequences." Mokkarasu of Kalki gave a negative review calling it cultural murder without wasting our money, advising Vivek to continue as comedian and felt Ravi K. Chandran shouldn't have gave opportunity to others to handle camera and concluded by lamenting that such films should not increase sexual crime.

=== Controversy ===
Human Rights Commission issued notices against A. M. Rathnam and Shankar for depicting youth in poor light in the film. All India Women's Association also expressed objection against the film for its vulgar content.

=== Box office ===
In Kerala, the film was bought by the distributor for ₹38 lakh, it collected more than ₹1.5 crore from the state. Shankar blamed the film's underperformance on video piracy, "television onslaught" and his belief that "only youngsters" came to watch the film as it apparently failed to appeal to other age demographics. Though the film underperformed in Tamil, the Telugu version was successful. The film also ran in Sri Lanka for fifty days. The success of the Telugu version caused Siddharth to move from Chennai to Hyderabad and focus on Telugu films.
