= Nenjathai Killadhe (2024 TV series) =

2024 Indian Tamil language TV series

- Genre: Romance; Drama
- Developed by: Ekta Kapoor
- Written by: Dialogues: Haran
- Screenplay by: Keerthika M Roa
- Directed by: Bramma G. Dev
- Starring: Jai Akash; Reshma Muralidharan
- Composer: MR
- Country of origin: India
- Original language: Tamil
- No. of episodes: 148

Production
- Production location: Chennai
- Cinematography: Kopal
- Editor: K. Sakthivel
- Camera setup: Multi-camera
- Running time: 22 minutes
- Production company: Esthell Entertainers

Original release
- Network: Zee Tamil
- Release: 1 July 2024 – 17 January 2025

Related
- Bade Achhe Lagte Hain

Nenjathai Killadhe (transl. Don't Pinch the Heart) is an Indian Tamil language television series starring Jai Akash and Reshma Muralidharan in lead roles. The show is an official remake of SET's Hindi series Bade Achhe Lagte Hain. It is aired on Zee Tamil and premiered on 1 July 2024.

== Synopsis ==
The story revolves around a two different family background people Goutham and Mathumitha. Goutham, a business tycoon, gets into a marriage of convenience with Mathumitha, an educated middle-class woman almost a decade younger than him. They accidentally discover love after marriage.

== Cast ==
=== Main ===
- Jai Akash as Goutham Palanisamy: Madhumitha's husband
  - Ashwini, Abishek, Maya and Rahul's half-brother
- Reshma Muralidharan as Mathumitha: Goutham's wife
  - Ramakrishanan and Renuka's elder daughter; Adithi and Jeeva's sister

=== Recurring ===
==== Mathumitha's family ====
- Tharani as Renuka Ramakrishanan
  - Ramakrishanan's wife, Mathumitha, Adithi and Jeeva's mother, Pangajam's daughter
- G.Sivan srinivasan as Ramakrishanan; Renuka's husband
- Kousalya Senthamarai as Pangajam 'Pinky Patty'
- Madhumitha Illayaraja as Adithi Ramakrishanan
- Pranav Mohan as Jeeva Ramakrishanan

==== Goutham's family ====
- Rekha Krishnappa as Sakuntala; Goutham's stepmother, Ashwini and Abishek's mother
- Nancy as Ashwini; Arun's wife
- Maanas Chavali as Abishek
- Diya Chitty as Maya; Jeeva's wife
- VJ Shree as Rahul
- Sasindhar Pushpalingam as Arun; Ashwini's husband

==== Others ====
- Shyam Viswanathan as Santhosh; Goutham's friend and Aparna's husband
- Krithikaa Laddu as Aparna Santhosh
- Anu as Sruthi
- Siddharth Kapilavayi as Kiran; Anu's husband

=== Special appearances ===
- Gautami as herself

== Production ==
=== Casting ===
In begin May 2024, Jai Akash and Reshma Muralidharan was reportedly cast for the lead roles of new Zee Tamil series and was officially confirmed on 21 May.

Actor Jai Akash was selected to portray the lead role of Goutham, who is an unmarried, wealthy, established businessman. He made his comeback after Neethane Enthan Ponvasantham. Actress Reshma Muralidharan was selected for the female lead role Mathumitha. On 15 November 2024, actress Gautami was cast in a special appearance.

== Adaptations ==
Language	Title	Original release	Network(s)	Last aired	Notes
Hindi	Bade Achhe Lagte Hain बडे अच्छे लगते हैं	30 May 2011	SET	10 July 2014	Original
Malayalam	Anuraga Ganam Pole അനുരാഗ ഗാനം പോലെ	17 April 2023	Zee Keralam	15 March 2024	Remake
Kannada	Amruthadhaare ಅಮೃತಧಾರೆ	29 May 2023	Zee Kannada	15 November 2026	Remake
Tamil	Nenjathai Killadhe நெஞ்சத்தை கில்லாதே	1 July 2024	Zee Tamil	17 January 2025	Remake
Marathi	Veen Doghantali Hi Tutena वीण दोघांतली ही तुटेना	11 August 2025	Zee Marathi	Ongoing	Remake
