= Kizhakke Varum Paattu =

- Title card
- Directed by: Radha Bharathi
- Written by: Radha Bharathi
- Produced by: T. Narayanan
- Starring: Prashanth; Charmila
- Cinematography: K. S. Selvaraj
- Edited by: Lancy Mohan
- Music by: Deva
- Production company: Apple Creations
- Release date: 11 December 1993
- Running time: 135 minutes
- Country: India
- Language: Tamil

Kizhakke Varum Paattu (transl. The song from the east) is a 1993 Indian Tamil-language romance film directed by Radha Bharathi starring Prashanth and Charmila. The film was released on 11 December 1993.

== Plot ==
The story is about Moorthy, who comes to his native place. He meets the village headman's daughter Kanmani and they bond. Their acquaintance blossoms into an inseparable affair of love and life. The elder brother of Kanmani, who returns from jail opposes their marriage. The story carries a flashback of Moorthy's father. Subsequently, many untoward incidents takes place with a lot of twists and turns. Moorthy withstands the turmoil and succeeds in seeking the hand of Kanmani.

== Cast ==
- Prashanth as Moorthy
- Charmila as Kanmani
- M. N. Nambiar
- Nambirajan
- Kumarimuthu
- Oru Viral Krishna Rao
- T. S. Raja
- Gundu Ravi
- Mimicry Ravi
- Kennadi
- Adhirshtan
- Jeyanthan
- Sathyapriya as Kanmani's mother
- Malathi
- Sridevi
- Nirmala
- Usha Nandhari

== Soundtrack ==
The soundtrack was composed by Deva. For the dubbed Telugu version Allari Bullodu, all lyrics were written by Rajasri. The song "Super Superstar" is loosely based on the Urdu song Hawa Hawa.

Tamil track listing
| No. | Title | Lyrics | Singer(s) | Length |
|---|---|---|---|---|
| 1. | "Saamathu Kathu" | Kalidasan | Mano, K. S. Chithra | 4:42 |
| 2. | "Aayiram Thadaigal" | Kalidasan | S. P. Balasubrahmanyam, Sundarajan | 5:07 |
| 3. | "Kuthaala Aruvi" | Kalidasan | S. P. Balasubrahmanyam | 4:08 |
| 4. | "Neela Karunguilea" | Kalidasan | S. P. Balasubrahmanyam | 4:18 |
| 5. | "Jilendru" | Kalidasan | S. P. Balasubrahmanyam | 5:16 |
| 6. | "Super Super" | Ravi Bharathi | Malaysia Vasudevan | 4:12 |

Telugu track listing
| No. | Title | Singer(s) | Length |
|---|---|---|---|
| 1. | "Andam Chindi" | S. P. Balasubrahmanyam | 5:03 |
| 2. | "Nee Needevunnanu" | S. P. Balasubrahmanyam | 4:14 |
| 3. | "Vayyari Ra" | S. P. Balasubrahmanyam | 4:03 |
| 4. | "Are Paapa" | S. P. Balasubrahmanyam | 4:24 |
| 5. | "Ningiloki Vennlayi" | Radhika | 1:35 |
| 6. | "Super Super" | S. P. Balasubrahmanyam | 4:07 |
| 7. | "Nee Mate Naku" | S. P. Balasubrahmanyam, K. S. Chithra | 4:38 |
| Total length: | | | 28:07 |
