= Sakthi Paramesh =

Indian film director

- Born: Tamil Nadu, India
- Other names: Parameswar, Jagan
- Years active: 1998 – present

Sakthi Paramesh (sometime known as Parameswar) is a Tamil film director. He made his directorial debut with Suriya Paarvai and went on to make other films like Looty, Three Roses and Thavam.

== Career ==
Sakthi Paramesh made his directorial debut with Arjun starrer Suriya Paarvai under the name Jagan. The film became a failure at box office. He then directed Looty with Sathyaraj under the name Parameswar. The film received average reviews and became an average grosser. He then began work on a comedy film titled Maams featuring Prabhu, Rambha and Radhika Chaudhari, but the film was cancelled after a few schedules.

Parameswaran's next directorial was Three Roses. During the shoot of the film, there was reportedly a clash of opinions between actresses Jyothika and Laila in January 2002, with the pair having to be restrained by the actress-producer of the film, Rambha. Problems continued as the careers of Laila and Rambha began to peter out, prompting distributors to back away from the film, leading to further delays. The film evaded its release date several times and eventually took close to two years to complete, only finally releasing on 10 October 2003. The film gained negative reviews with Malathi Rangarajan of The Hindu citing that "a frivolous storyline, a lackadaisical approach to the screenplay and inept direction mar Three Roses", adding that "after all the hype and hoopla, speculation and delay, arrives Three Roses, and ironically it is focus that the film lacks." Another critic claimed that "the disastrous effects all these problems (changes in cast, production delays) have had on the movie is clearly evident from the final product."

Parameswaran's next directorial was Vanakkam Thalaiva with Sathyaraj. His name was credited as Sakthi Paramesh. The film failed at box office. He then directed Thavam with Arun Vijay. The film received negative reviews and eventually became a failure at box office. In 2011, he wrote and produced another movie titled Kaidhi which was made entirely in Malaysia with local technicians. The venture directed by newcomer Seenu released across Malaysia, and Parameshwar felt that the film would increase cross-dialogue about film making between the two countries. In 2013, he directed Karumpuli, a story revolving around terrorism with rookie actors including Rathan Mouli. Though the film eventually had a low key release, it garnered attention prior to release owing to the Censor Board's recommendations for heavy editing.

== Filmography ==
- Suriya Paarvai (1999)
- Looty (2001)
- Three Roses (2003)
- Vanakkam Thalaiva (2005)
- Thavam (2007)
- Karumpuli (2013)
