= Kicha Vayasu 16 =

- CD cover
- Directed by: A. N. Rajagopal
- Starring: Simran; Manikandan; Jai Akash
- Music by: Dhina
- Release date: 25 March 2005
- Country: India
- Language: Tamil

Kicha Vayasu 16 (transl. Kicha, Age 16) is a 2005 Indian Tamil language film directed by A. N. Rajagopal starring Simran and Manikandan, with Jai Akash and Sujibala in supporting roles. The film centers around the antics of the eponymous character, Kicha, with other teenagers in the city of Nagercoil. The music was composed by Dhina. The film released on 25 March 2005.

== Plot ==
Krishnamoorthy (Jai Akash), known as Kicha in his youth, is the District Collector who returns to his childhood city of Nagercoil to demolish an old school, which he recognises as his former school. He reminiscences his school days in Nagercoil form the main theme of the film.

The film then transitions to when Kicha (Manikandan) is a 16-year-old boy. After Nirmala (Simran), a teacher whom Kicha has a crush on, becomes the headmistress of their school, Kicha, who often teases people around him, becomes very well-behaved towards Nirmala. Because of this, he often garners her support. However, Kicha, being his usual self, begins leading a group of errant boys who perform various misdemeanors around their town. This includes stealing and selling dishes from the school and eating in restaurants without paying the bill.

Kicha and his friends are finally caught when they attempt to escape after not paying a hotel bill. The hotel owner thrashes them and the other boys claim that Kicha taught them to do such things. When the boys' parents are notified of this, many become angry, claiming that Kicha has misled their children and made them wayward. Soon after, Kicha acts up toward a girl in the neighborhood. After she makes his bad behavior public, Kicha travels out of embarrassment to Madurai with his elder brother. However, Kicha's schoolmates steal from the school in his absence and accuse Kicha of having done so. Nirmala, who has a good opinion of Kicha, summons him from Madurai for enquiries. After Nirmala decides that Kicha is guilty, she feels deeply let down and curses him for never being up to any good. Kicha returns to Madurai, studies with a vengeance, and eventually returns to Nagercoil as the Collector.

In Nagercoil, Kicha travels to Nirmala's home to visit her but finds that she is out of the country and is expected to return after six months. Kicha plans to marry Subbu (Sujibala), who had been in love with him. After Kicha arrives at Subbu's house, she is very enthusiastic to see him again and leaves with Kicha.

Nirmala is portrayed as an ideal headmistress: she is strict towards her students when required and lenient when being so is appropriate.

== Cast ==
- Simran as Nirmala
- Manikandan as Teenage Kicha (aged 16)
- Jai Akash as Krishnamoorthy (Older Kicha)
- Sujibala as Subbu
- Sweatha Bharathi as Kicha's friend
- Pandu
- T. P. Gajendran as Kicha's father
- Vaiyapuri as Kicha's elder brother
- Benjamin
- Aarthi as Teacher
- King Kong as Student
- Paravai Muniyamma
- Kumarimuthu
- Chelladurai
- Kovai Senthil
- Nellai Siva
- Citizen Mani
- Velmurugan
- Gowthami Vembunathan
- Kottachi
- Deepak Bagga (cameo)

== Production ==
The film was to be produced by Ramoji Rao and star Richard Rishi.

== Soundtrack ==
The music composed by Dhina, with lyrics written by P. Vijay, Snehan, and Yugabharathi.

Kicha Vayasu 16

Soundtrack album by Dhina
- Released: 2005
- Genre: Feature film soundtrack
- Language: Tamil
- Producer: Dhina

Dhina chronology
Iyer IPS (2005)	Kicha Vayasu 16 (2005)	Kokki (2006)

No.	Song	Singers	Lyrics
1	"Aangalai Enakku"	Sumithra, Dev Prakash	Yugabharathi
2	"Kelambuthu"	Karthik, Dhina, Divya Kasthuri, Dev Prakash, Kiran	Snehan
3	"Mottu Vitta"	Sujatha, Paravai Muniyamma	Snehan
4	"Patheyappadi"	Malathy, Shankar Mahadevan	Snehan
5	"Poonai Mudi"	Manikka Vinayagam, Anuradha Sriram	Yugabharathi
6	"Solla Mudiyala"	Hariharan, Chinmayi	Pa. Vijay
7	"Sila Neram"	Unni Menon	Pa. Vijay

== Reception ==
A critic from Sify wrote that "If you like stale jokes and double meaning dialogues and peep shows then Kitcha Vayasu 16 is your ticket to sleaze".
