= Sevvel =

- DVD cover
- Directed by: P. Primus
- Written by: P. Primus
- Produced by: P. Primus
- Starring: Rajkiran; Seetha; Jai Akash; Kalabhavan Mani
- Cinematography: P. Primus
- Edited by: M. N. Raja
- Music by: Aasan
- Production company: Therace Film Corporation
- Release date: 8 April 2005
- Country: India
- Language: Tamil

Sevvel (/sɛvveɪl/) is a 2005 Indian Tamil-language film, directed and produced by Primus. The film stars Rajkiran, Seetha, Jai Akash and Kalabhavan Mani.

== Cast ==
- Rajkiran as Sudalai
- Seetha as Sevanthi
- Jai Akash as Sevvel aka Raja
- Kalabhavan Mani as Parasuram
- Vadivukkarasi
- Misha Shah
- Radha Ravi as Lawyer
- Livingston
- Ilavarasu
- Singamuthu
- Gowthami Vembunathan
- Bonda Mani
- Kovai Senthil

== Production ==
Jai Akash plays a lawyer. Mumbai based model Misha Shah made her Tamil debut. The film was shot at Chennai and Sri Lanka.

== Soundtrack ==
The music was composed by Aasan, in his debut.

Song	Singers	Lyrics	Length (m:ss)
"Sivanoda"	Tippu	Piraisoodan	04:18
"Unnai Unnai"	Srinivas, Gopika Poornima		05:44
"Kalla Parvai"	Harish Raghavendra, Harini		04:48
"Sutti Penne"	Karthik, Mahathi		04:28
"Akka Maga"	Sri Ram		04:19
"Then Podhigai"	Prasanna Rao		03:40

== Reception ==
A critic from Sify opined that "All in all a disappointing venture from a debutant director". Malini Mannath of Chennai Online wrote "The knot had potential and with better scripting and smoother narration would have turned out to be an engaging film. Not much expectation here, so no heavy disappointment either!". Visual Dasan of Kalki wrote a review as form of two lawyers arguing whether Rajkiran or Jai Akash is the main protagonist with judge concluding director in a way is the protagonist in giving twists to unite them.
