= Vanakkam Thalaiva =

- Directed by: Sakthi Paramesh
- Screenplay by: Sakthi Paramesh
- Story by: M. K. Maheshwar
- Dialogues by: M. K. Maheshwar
- Produced by: V.Palanivel; A.C.Anandan
- Starring: Sathyaraj; Abbas; Susan; Pranathi; Vivek
- Cinematography: Sureshdevan
- Edited by: P. Saisuresh
- Music by: Deva
- Production company: AP Film Garden
- Release date: 22 December 2005
- Running time: 145 minutes
- Country: India
- Language: Tamil

Vanakkam Thalaiva (transl. Welcome Leader) is a 2005 Indian Tamil-language comedy thriller film directed by Sakthi Paramesh. It stars Sathyaraj, Abbas, Susan, and Vivek.

== Plot ==
The plot is dramatically woven around the different roles donned by Satyaraj and the reason behind him taking up such roles. The movie begins with Manickam (Sathyaraj) kidnapping Divya (Susan), who is the girlfriend of Mano (Abbas). Mano decides to rescue Divya, but fails to do so after repeated attempts. In every attempt, he is foiled by Manickam through one of his many disguises.

At this point, Mano's friend Aruchamy (Vivek) comes to help him in his dilemma. Aruchamy is a suspended police officer and managed to be appointed by Manickam to be his lorry cleaner. This way, he and Mano are able to trace out where Divya is held. Mano, realizing that it is Manickam who has been foiling his attempts to rescue Divya, goes to the place where she is kept hidden along with the police.

Divya suddenly says that she was married to Manickam years ago and that she never knew Mano, causing Mano to go crazy.

Finally, Aruchamy makes Manickam confess the truth. Manickam's wife Ramya (Pranathi) was run over by Mano's, who was under the influence of alcohol at the time. The case was covered up using his wealth and status.

== Cast ==
- Sathyaraj as Manickam
- Abbas as Mano
- Susan as Divya
- Pranathi as Ramya
- Vivek as S. I. Aruchamy from Pondicherry
- Vennira Aadai Moorthy
- Nalini as Mano's aunt
- Shakeela
- Thalapathy Dinesh
- Nellai Siva as Police Inspector
- Cell Murugan as Police Inspector
- Chaplin Balu
- Abhinayashree (special appearance in "Suttapazham")
- Gumtaj (special appearance in "Suttapazham")

== Production ==
The song and stunt sequences were shot at Munnar. The scene where Sathyaraj kidnaps Abbas was shot near Chengalpattu.

== Soundtrack ==
The film's soundtrack was composed by Deva, while lyrics were written by Pa. Vijay, Snehan, Yugabharathi, and Punitha Prakash.

No.	Song	Singers	Lyrics	Length (m:ss)
1	Aandavan Koduthada	Manikka Vinayagam	Pa. Vijay	05:04
2	Tamil Theriyum	Gayathri E., Ranjith	Punitha Prakash	04:32
3	Suttapazham	Grace Karunas, Sabesh	Yugabharathi	05:06
4	Pollathavan	Mano	Snehan	05:39
5	Eppo Thara	Krishnaraj, Anuradha Sriram	Snehan	04:17

== Reception ==
Sify wrote "It is a far out plot with a wafer-thin storyline and you will have to suspend disbelief. The film is strictly for the B and C audience whose idea of entertainment is double entendre and crude gags". Malathi Ranagarajan of The Hindu noted that "Had it not been caught in unwarranted commercial features, `Vanakkam ... ' would have been a very positive film with a poignant message". Cinesouth wrote "Director Shakti Parameshwar had promised suspense scene for scene, but has not lived up to expectations. But the film has the required commercial ingredients of Sathyaraj’s antics, Vivek’s comedy, item dances and glamour girls, so the film will definitely not be a loss".
