= Kadhal FM =

- DVD cover
- Directed by: Jayaprakash
- Produced by: G. Maheswaran
- Starring: Manikandan; Shivani Singh; Aravind Akash
- Cinematography: Suresh Devan
- Edited by: V. T. Vijayan
- Music by: Aravind–Shankar
- Production company: S V M Productions
- Release date: 4 March 2005
- Country: India
- Language: Tamil

Kadhal FM (transl. Love FM) is a 2005 Indian Tamil-language romance film directed by Jayaprakash, starring Manikandan, Shivani Singh and Aravind Akash.

== Cast ==
- Manikandan as Manikandan
- Shivani Singh as Ruchika
- Aravind Akash as Aravind
- Karunas as Chilly Chicken
- Ilavarasu as Astrologer
- Vaiyapuri as Inspector
- Lollu Sabha Balaji as Bala
- Ajay Rathnam as Principal
- Anu Mohan as Traffic police officer
- Balu Anand as Balaji

== Production ==
The film is directed by Jayaprakash who previously directed Sathisanam (1997). It was shot in and around Chennai, Pondicherry, Tuticorin, Karaikudi, Auroville and Tiruchi.

== Soundtrack ==
The soundtrack was composed by Aravind–Shankar.

Track listing
| No. | Title | Singer(s) | Length |
|---|---|---|---|
| 1. | "Adam Eval" | Karthik |
| 2. | "Bhagyasaali" | Timmy |
| 3. | "Kadale" | Srinivas |
| 4. | "Mugama" | Chinmayi |
| 5. | "Un Udal" | Sandeep, Sunitha Sarathy |

== Reception ==
Malini Mannath of Chennai Online opined that "there's not much going for the film with its hotch-potch situations and lacklustre narration. A couple of suggestive lines have been surreptitiously pushed in, and the sound picturisations too border more on the 'sizzling' than the aesthetic". Sify wrote, "There are a couple of double meaning dialogues and a bit of glamour associated with a film aimed at the youth. Karunas as RJ Chilly chicken gives you a stomach ache. Music by debutant Aravind- Shankar is peppy but forgettable. Manikandan is adequate in the role while Shivani has enough glamour to please the masses. The film has nothing new to offer and moves at snail pace".
