= Su. Samuthiram =

- Born: 1941; Tippanampatti, Tirunelveli district, Tamil Nadu
- Died: 1 April 2003 (aged 61)
- Occupation: writer
- Awards: Sahitya Akademi Award (1990)

Su. Samuthiram (1941 – 1 April 2003), was a Tamil writer from Tamil Nadu, India.

== Biography ==
Samuthiram was born in Tippanampatti village in Tirunelveli District. He worked in All India Radio and Doordarshan. He was a prolific writer who wrote fourteen novels, four novellas, two essay anthologies, one play and more than 300 short stories (published as twenty two collections). Many of his works have been translated into other Indian languages like Telugu, Hindi and Malayalam. His political orientation was socialist and he was involved in many literary feuds with his fellow writers like Asokamitran and Vannanilavan. His works reflect his socialist beliefs and most of them are about the oppression of the downtrodden. In 1990, he was awarded the Sahitya Akademi Award for Tamil for his novel Veril Pazhutha Pala (lit. The Jack Fruit that ripened at the root). He died in 2003 in a road accident in Chennai.

== Awards ==
- Sahitya Akademi Award for Tamil (1990)
- Tamil Annai award from Tamil University, Thanjavur
- Ilakkiyachinthanai Short Story prize.
- Kalaignar Award from Murasoli Trust (posthumous)

== Partial bibliography ==
=== Novels ===
- Veril pazhutha pala
- Vaada malli
- Palai pura
- Oorukkul oru puratchi
- Oru Kottukku VeLiyae
- Kagidha Uravugal
- Mann Sumai
- Thalai Paagai
- Velichathai nokki
- Valarppu magal
- Sathiyathukku kattupattal
- Tharaasu
- Sathiya avesam
- Illam thorum idayangal
- Nizhal mukangal
- Moottam
- Oththai Veedu
- Puthai Manal
- Chotru Pattaalam
- Uyarathin Thaazhvukal

== See also ==
- List of Sahitya Akademi Award winners for Tamil
- List of Indian writers
- List of Tamil-language writers
