= Gurudeva (film) =

Gurudeva Guru
- Directed by: B. Jaffer
- Written by: B. Jaffer; Y Venkateswaralu (Telugu dialogues)
- Produced by: K. Kaliyamurthy
- Starring: Jai Akash; Pranathi; Nasser; Ilavarasu; Vijayakumar; Riyaz Khan
- Cinematography: R. Madhi
- Edited by: R. R. Eshwar; Editing supervision: V. T. Vijayan
- Music by: Sabesh–Murali
- Production company: Sriselva Muthukumara Movies
- Release dates: 1 April 2005 (Tamil); 30 June 2005 (Telugu)
- Country: India
- Languages: Tamil; Telugu

Gurudeva is a 2005 Indian romantic drama film directed by Jaffer. The music by Sabesh–Murali and produced by K. Kaliyamurthy. The film stars Jai Akash, along with Pranathi, Nassar, and Riyaz Khan. The film was shot simultaneously in Tamil and Telugu as Guru. This film was released on 1 April 2005 under the banner of Sriselva Muthukumara Movies. Jai Akash acting was very good and was appreciated by the critics.The film received very good response from the audience and did well at the box office till Super Star Rajinikanth's Chandramukhi released.

== Plot ==
The movie is about a street rowdy's love for a rich heiress. Guru is a street rowdy who hangs out in a mechanic shop owned by Mari, a handicapped man who is the advisor to Guru. They lead a happy life. Deva falls in love with him. Later they both decide to marry.

== Cast ==
Actor (Tamil)	Actor (Telugu)	Role
Jai Akash		Guru
Pranathi		Deva
Nassar		
Dhamu	Srinivasa Reddy	Guru's friends
Muthukaalai	Srinivasa Reddy	Guru's friends
Vaiyapuri	Chitram Srinu	Guru's friends
Karthik Sabesh	Babloo	Guru's friends
Ilavarasu	Gautam Raju	Police officer
Vijayakumar		
Pandu		
Madhan Bob		Doctor
Omakuchi Narasimhan		

Tamil version

- Nassar as Maari
- Vijayakumar as Sundar
- Riyaz Khan as Deva's unwanted suitor
- Dhamu as Poonai
- Chelladurai
- Kovai Senthil as Priest
- Devadarshini as Deva's friend

== Soundtrack ==
Music by Sabesh–Murali. The audio was released on 31 January 2005 at AVM Studios.

Track listing
No.	Title	Singer(s)	Length
1.	"Aanandham Aanandham"	Tippu, Mathangi
2.	"Saiva Karuvadu"	Sabesh, Manikka Vinayagam, Srilekha Parthasarathy
3.	"Azhage Azhage"	Srinivas, Anuradha Sriram
4.	"Silenta Sirichu"	Karthik, Pop Shalini
5.	"Manakudhada"	Tippu

== Release and reception ==
The film was scheduled to release on 14 February, but was delayed. A critic from Sify opined that "There is nothing new in the way if presentation and music director Sabesh Murali rehashes old ?gana? songs of Deva". The film released alongside the low budget films Girivalam and Thaka Thimi Tha and did not fare well at the box office.

The film was released in Telugu as Guru in June 2005. Since the Telugu version failed due to lack of publicity, Jai Akash went to the Telugu producer Muppa Ankanna Rao's house and threatened him. Akash was subsequently sent to jail and released after a compromise was made.
