= Jai Akash =

Indian Tamil actor

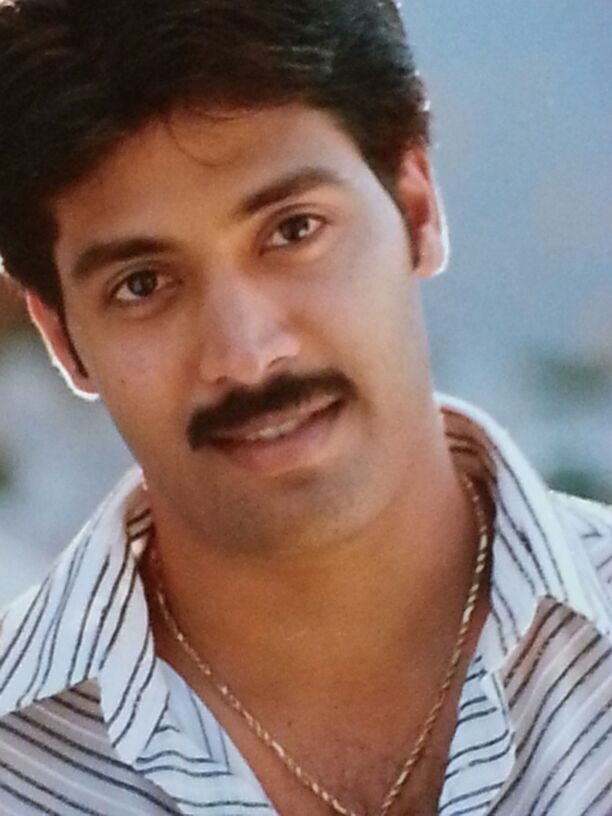
- Jai Akash
- Born: Jai Sathish Nageswaran; Colombo, Sri Lanka
- Other name: Akash
- Occupations: Actor, Director
- Years active: 1999-present

Jai Akash, also known as Akash, is an Indian actor and director who works in Tamil, Telugu and Kannada films and television. He is known for the film Anandam (2001).

== Career ==
Jai Sathish, of Sri Lankan Tamil origin settled in London, sent his modelling photographs to the "Star Search" service run by Suhasini's entertainment portal website TamilTalkies.com during the late 1990s. K. Balachander used the 'Star Search' platform when casting a new actor to portray the second hero role in Rojavanam (1999) and selected him to be in the film under the stage name of Akash.

Akash's first Telugu film, Anandam, directed by Sreenu Vaitla and produced by Ramoji Rao, was a Silver Jubilee film for which Akash won many awards for his excellent natural acting. He became an overnight sensation who gained renowned attention from many top producers and directors. However, Akash elected to select projects with new directors, but most of these projects were produced by struggling producers. He acted in several Telugu films including the unreleased June July opposite Sadha, Pilisthe Palukutha opposite Shamitha Shetty, directed by Kodi Ramakrishna, the songs of which composed by M. M. Keeravani became a hit, especially the song "Manasa Ottu Maatadothu". His film Idemi Oorura Babu was also not released.

He returned to Tamil as a lead with the film Inidhu Inidhu Kadhal Inidhu (2003), a remake of Anandam, opposite Neha, which was again produced by Ramoji Rao. He was credited as Jai Akash due to the presence of Aravind Akash, an actor with a similar name. In 2004, he teamed up with Sreenu Vaitla again in Anandamanandamaye.

He also starred in six Tamil films between 2004 and 2005; Ramakrishna, Kicha Vayasu 16, Gurudeva, Sevvel, Amudhae and Kaatrullavarai. The Tamil films he acted as hero were with top Tamil directors, such as Agathiyan and Ezhil, but those films didn't get proper release.

Jai Akash again returned to the Telugu film industry as a second hero and acted in three films produced by Super Good Films, namely Andala Ramudu (2006), Nava Vasantham (2007) and Gorintaku (2008). All of these three films became super hit and again Akash received many offers to star as a hero in Telugu. In 2009, he acted and directed a Telugu film named, Sweet Heart, and also acted in the Tamil romantic movie, Adada Enna Azhagu. In 2010, he starred in a bilingual movie, Vandae Maatharam, where he played alongside Mammootty and Arjun.

After a break in directing, Jai Akash returned as a director and acted in the film Ayudha Porattam (2011), which dealt with the issue of arms supply to the island nation of Sri Lanka during the civil war. Following which, he also worked as a director and acted as a hero in the films Yuganiki Okka Premikudu (2012), Mr. Rajesh (2013) and Aa Iddaru (2013). A notable mention to his self-directed Telugu film, Mr. Rajesh, where he acted in seven roles.

Jai Akash entered the television field in 2020 with the Tamil soap opera Neethane Enthan Ponvasantham which premiered on 24 February 2020. In 2023, he entered the Telugu television field with the series Anu Ane Nenu. In 2024, he returned to the Tamil television industry with the series, Nenjathai Killadhe. He won Best Hero award from Tamil Nadu Government for his acting in Neethanae Enthan Ponvasantham.

== Filmography ==
- Note: he is credited as Akash in Telugu films and in Tamil films from 1999 to 2002.

Year	Film	Role	Language	Notes
1999	Rojavanam	Siva	Tamil	
2000	Penngal	Bharath Nageswaran	Tamil	
2001	Ramma Chilakamma	Vishwa	Telugu	
2001	Anandam	Kiran	Telugu	
2002	Roja Kootam	Sriram	Tamil	
2002	Neetho Cheppalani	Balu	Telugu	
2002	Manasutho	Kanishk	Telugu	
2002	Pilisthe Palukutha	Ajay	Telugu	
2003	Hitech Students	Akash	Telugu	
2003	Inidhu Inidhu Kadhal Inidhu	Sibi	Tamil	
2003	Vasantham	Michael	Telugu	
2003	Three Roses	Akash	Tamil	Guest appearance
2004	Anandamanandamaye	Kiran	Telugu	
2004	Ramakrishna	Ramakrishna	Tamil	
2005	Kicha Vayasu 16	Krishnamoorthy	Tamil	
2005	Gurudeva	Guru	Tamil	
2005	Sevvel	Sevvel	Tamil	
2005	Amudhae	Dhinakar	Tamil	
2005	Guru	Guru	Telugu	
2005	Kaatrullavarai	Bala	Tamil	
2006	Naidu LLB		Telugu	
2006	Andala Ramudu	Raghu	Telugu	
2007	Jambada Hudugi	Rakesh	Kannada	
2007	Nava Vasantham	Prasad	Telugu	
2007	Dhee	Ajay	Telugu	
2007	Evarinaina Edirista		Telugu	
2008	Nesthama	Ravi	Telugu	
2008	Gorintaku	Akash	Telugu	
2008	Heegu Unte		Kannada	
2009	Adada Enna Azhagu	Vasan	Tamil	
2009	Sweet Heart	Raja	Telugu	Partially reshot in Tamil
2010	Namo Venkatesa	Ajay	Telugu	
2010	Jayahe		Kannada	Dubbed into Telugu as Lady Bruce Lee
2010	Vandae Maatharam	Ashok	Malayalam; Tamil	
2011	Ayudha Porattam	Jai / Leader	Tamil	Dual role
2011	Othigai	Suriya	Tamil	
2012	Yuganiki Okka Premikudu	Gautam	Telugu	
2013	Win	Arya	Telugu	Partially reshot in Tamil
2013	Mr. Rajesh	Akshay, Kiran, Mr. Rajesh, and 4 other characters	Telugu	
2013	Aa Iddaru	Subash	Telugu	
2014	Kadhalukku Kanillai	Murali / Anand	Tamil	
2014	Donga Prema	John / Victor	Telugu	Partially reshot in Tamil
2015	O Malli		Telugu	
2016	Naan Yaar	Shiva	Tamil	
2019	Chennai 2 Bangkok	Jai	Tamil	Also choreographer
2022	Amaichar		Tamil	
2023	Jai Vijayam	Jai	Tamil	

=== As director, writer, and producer ===
Year	Title	Credited as			Language	Notes
Year	Title	Director	Writer	Producer	Language	Notes
2009	Sweet Heart	Yes	Yes		Telugu	Partially reshot in Tamil as Maamaram (2025)
2011	Ayudha Porattam	Yes	Yes	Yes	Tamil	
2012	Yuganiki Okka Premikudu	Yes	Yes		Telugu	
2013	Mr. Rajesh	Yes	Yes		Telugu	
2013	Aa Iddaru	Yes	Yes		Telugu	
2014	Kadhalukku Kanillai	Yes	Yes	Yes	Tamil	
2014	Donga Prema	Yes	Yes		Telugu	Partially reshot in Tamil as Yokkiyan (2023)
2016	Naan Yaar		Yes	Yes	Tamil	
2016	Oruthal			Distributor	Tamil	
2023	Jai Vijayam	Yes	Yes	Yes	Tamil	

== Television ==
Year	Series	Role	Language	Channel
2020–2021	Neethane Enthan Ponvasantham	Surya Prakash (Surya)	Tamil	Zee Tamil
2022	Thavamai Thavamirundhu	ACP M. Abhimanyu	Tamil	Zee Tamil
2023	Anu Ane Nenu	Dr. Venkatesh	Telugu	Gemini TV
2024-2025	Nenjathai Killadhe	Goutham	Tamil	Zee Tamil

== Awards ==
Year	Award	Category	Film	Result
2002	Cinema Express Awards	Best Actor – Telugu	Anandam	Won
2003	Santosham Film Awards	Best Supporting Actor	Vasantam	Won
2009	Santosham Film Awards	Best Character Actor	Gorintaku	Won
2007	Santosham Film Awards	Best Actor Jury Award	Nava Vasantham	Won
2026	Government of Tamil Nadu	Best Hero	Neethane Enthan Ponvasantham	Won
