= Manikandan =

Indian actor

- Born: 29 November 1983 (age 42)
- Other name: Boys Manikandan
- Occupation: Actor
- Years active: 2003–2014; 2023–present

Manikanda is an Indian actor who appears in Tamil language films. He has acted in films including Boys (2003) and Kicha Vayasu 16 (2005). He had a career resurgence with Maharaja (2024).

== Career ==
Manikandan, a visual communications graduate who had featured in Kala's dance troupe doing stage shows, was selected by Shankar to feature in his coming-of-age film Boys after impressing in auditions. He shot for the film throughout 2002 alongside fellow debutants Siddharth, Genelia D'Souza, Bharath, Nakul and Thaman. The story centerd on six youngsters, conveying a message about the importance of good education and career over distractions, such as romance and sex, and marked a move away from Shankar's usual brand of vigilante films, gaining much publicity prior to release. The film opened to mixed reviews but became successful at the box office, with reviewers noting the ensemble cast as "excellent". In the following years, while the other five debut actors have been successful, Manikandan has struggled to receive acclaim and feature in high-profile films.

Notably, director Shankar revealed that Manikandan was edged by Bharath to star in Balaji Sakthivel's Kaadhal (2004), which had won Bharath significant acclaim. Manikandan subsequently received offers to feature as the lead actor in Kadhal FM (2005) and then alongside Simran in Kicha Vayasu 16, but both films were low key releases and fared poorly at the box office. He missed opportunities to act in Thenmerku Paruvakaatru (2010) and Soodhu Kavvum (2013), which catapulted Vijay Sethupathi to stardom. He has since starred in several low-budget films, including Gurusamy and Kaadhal 2014.

Manikandan made his acting comeback in 2023 with Adhik Ravichandran's directorial films Bagheera and Mark Antony. In 2024, he received praise from film critics for his portrayal of Dhana, one of the villains, in the revenge film starring Vijay Sethupathi titled Maharaja.

== Filmography ==
Year	Film	Role	Notes
2003	Boys	Kumar	
2005	Kadhal FM	Manikandan	
2005	Kicha Vayasu 16	Kicha	
2006	Yuga	Rishi	
2010	Bayam Ariyaan	Pazham	
2010	Moscowin Kavery	Moscow's friend	
2011	Gurusamy	Subramani	
2014	Kaadhal 2014	Kumar	
2023	Bagheera	Police Officer	
2023	Mark Antony	Kumar	
2024	Maharaja	Dhana	
