= List of songs recorded by P. Unnikrishnan =

P. Unnikrishnan (9 July 1966) is an Indian Carnatic vocalist and film playback singer. Best known for his work in Tamil films and other South Indian language films, Unnikrishnan has recorded over 4000 songs. He has also recorded songs for many non-film albums, tele-series, devotionals and classical collaborations.

Unnikrishnan shot to fame with his debut film song "Ennavale" composed by A. R. Rahman for the film Kaadhalan (1994). He fetched the National Film Award for Best Male Playback Singer for the song shared with his another solo "Uyirum Neeye" from the film Pavithra (1994), again composed by A. R. Rahman. Since then, Unnikrishnan has recorded thousands of film songs for various prominent South Indian music composers such as Ilaiyaraja, Vidyasagar, M. M. Keeravani, Sirpy, S. A. Rajkumar, Deva, Hamsalekha, Mani Sharma, Koti, Yuvan Shankar Raja, Karthik Raja, Harris Jayaraj, Bharadwaj and others.

== Recorded film songs ==
This is only a partial list; Unnikrishnan has sung over 4000 songs in Tamil, Kannada, Telugu and Malayalam.

== Tamil film songs ==
=== 1990s ===
Year	Film	Song	Composer(s)	Writer(s)	Co-artist(s)
1994	Kaadhalan	"Ennavale Adi Ennavale"(National Film award for best singer male)	A. R. Rahman	Vairamuthu	
1994	Pavithra	"Uyirum Neeye"	A. R. Rahman	Vairamuthu	
1994	Karuththamma	"Thenmerku Paruvakkatru"	A. R. Rahman	Vairamuthu	K. S. Chithra
1995	Sathi Leelavathi	"Maharajanodu Rani"	Ilaiyaraaja	Vaali	K. S. Chithra
1995	Thottil Kuzhandhai	"Manathile Oru Kanavu"	Adithyan	Panchu Arunachalam	Lalitha Sagari
1995	Murai Maman	"Anandam Anandam"	Vidyasagar	Palani Bharathi	Sujatha, Manorama
1995	Asuran	"O Vaanmathi"	Adithyan	Piraisoodan	Sangeetha Sajith
1995	Aasai	"Meenamma Athikalayilum"	Deva	Vaali	Anuradha Sriram
1995	Aasai	"Pulveli Pulveli"(Male)	Deva	Vairamuthu	
1995	Chandralekha	"Allah Un Aanai"	Ilaiyaraaja	Vaali	Preeti Uttam Singh
1995	Chandralekha	"Tharai Vaazhamal"	Ilaiyaraaja	Vaali	Arunmozhi
1995	Murai Mappillai	"Unnai Maranthu"	Swararaj	Vaali	K. S. Chithra
1995	Dear Son Maruthu	"Malarudhu Nilavu"	Deva	Vairamuthu	K. S. Chithra
1995	Rangeela	"Kadhali Nee Enna Seivai"	A. R. Rahman	Vairamuthu	Kavita Krishnamurthy
1996	Kizhakku Mugam	"Aathhukkullae"	Adithyan	Vairamuthu	Sangeetha Sajith
1996	Love Birds	"Naalai Ulagam"	A. R. Rahman	Vairamuthu	Sujatha
1996	Vaanmathi	"Oru Naalum"	Deva	Vaali	Anuradha Sriram
1996	Poove Unakkaga	"Aanantham Aanantham"	S. A. Rajkumar	Palani Bharathi	
1996	Poove Unakkaga	"Machinichi"	S. A. Rajkumar	Palani Bharathi	T. L. Maharajan, Sujatha, Sunandha
1996	Kalloori Vaasal	"Kiss Me"	Deva	Vairamuthu	K. S. Chithra
1996	Anthimanthaarai	"Sakhiye Nee"	A. R. Rahman	Vairamuthu	
1996	Kadhal Kottai	"Kaalamellam Kadhal Vazhga"	Deva	Agathiyan	K. S. Chithra
1996	Tamizh Selvan	"Aasa Kepakali"	Deva	Vairamuthu	K. S. Chithra
1996	Enakkoru Magan Pirappan	"Aathu Mettulae"	Karthik Raja	Arunmozhi	
1996	Enakkoru Magan Pirappan	"En Raasi"(Duet)	Karthik Raja	Arunmozhi	Sujatha
1996	Priyam	"Oru Kelvi"	Vidyasagar	Vairamuthu	Sujatha
1996	Kadhal Desam	"O Vennila"	A. R. Rahman	Vaali	
1996	Kadhal Desam	"Thendrale Thendrale"	A. R. Rahman	Vaali	Mano, Dominique Cerejo
1996	Parivattam	"Chinna Moondram Pirai"	Deva	Vairamuthu	
1996	Alexander	"Nadhiyoram"	Karthik Raja	Vaali	Bhavatharini
1997	Sakthi	"Aaraaro Enbathu"	R. Anandh	Vairamuthu	
1997	Iruvar	"Narumughaye"	A. R. Rahman	Vairamuthu	Bombay Jayashree
1997	Vaimaye Vellum	"Amma"	Deva	Vaali	
1997	Mannava	"Indu Maha Samudram"	Deva	Palani Bharathi	K. S. Chithra
1997	Aravindhan	"Pothum Idhu Pothum"	Yuvan Shankar Raja	Palani Bharathi	
1997	Dhinamum Ennai Gavani	"Sevvanthi Thotatthile"	Sirpy	Kamakodiyan	K. S. Chithra
1997	Raasi	"Thendral"	Sirpy	Vairamuthu	K. S. Chithra
1997	Raasi	"Ennachu Thangachi"	Sirpy	Vairamuthu	Mano, Febi Mani
1997	Love Today	"Yen Pennendru"	Shiva	Vairamuthu	
1997	Pistha	"Saranam Ayyappa"	S. A. Rajkumar	Kalidasan	
1997	Ullaasam	"Veesum Kaatrukku"	Karthik Raja	Palani Bharathi	Bhavatharini
1997	Ullaasam	"Ilavenil Thalattum"	Karthik Raja	Palani Bharathi	
1997	V.I.P	"Mayilu Mayilu Mayilamma"	Ranjit Barot	Vairamuthu	Mano, K. S. Chithra, Ranjini
1997	Kaadhali	"O Nenjae"	Deva	Ponniyin Selvan	
1997	Kadhal Palli	"Kadhali"	Deva	Vairamuthu	K. S. Chithra
1997	Periya Idathu Mappillai	"Oh Jaana Oh Jaana"	Sirpy	Palani Bharathi	Ishrath
1997	Nerrukku Ner	"Manam Virumbuthey (Male)"	Deva	Vairamuthu	
1997	Ganga Gowri	"Kadhal Solla Vandhaen"	Sirpy	Palani Bharathi	Sujatha
1997	Ratchagan	"Soniya Soniya"	A. R. Rahman	Vairamuthu	Udit Narayan, Harini
1997	Thadayam	"Oh Poornima"	Deva	Vaali	K. S. Chithra
1997	Kadavul	"Kaathalai"	Ilaiyaraaja	Vaali	Sujatha
1997	Rettai Jadai Vayasu	"Thaam Thakita Theem"	Deva	Vaasan	Mano
1997	Rettai Jadai Vayasu	"Vellipani Malare"	Deva	Ilakiyan	
1997	Itha Oru Snehagatha	"Enathu Nenjil"	Johnson		Ganga
1997	Itha Oru Snehagatha	"Nenjangal"	Johnson		
1998	Maru Malarchi	"Oorazhutha"	S. A. Rajkumar	Vaali	
1998	Maru Malarchi	"Ayyirandu Madhangal"	S. A. Rajkumar	Vaali	
1998	Maru Malarchi	"Nandri Solla Unakku"	S. A. Rajkumar	Vaali	K. S. Chithra
1998	Ponmanam	"Pattamboochi"	S. A. Rajkumar	Arivumathi	Sujatha
1998	Pooveli	"Oru Poo Ezhuthum Kavithai"	Bharadwaj	Vairamuthu	K. S. Chithra
1998	Guru Paarvai	"Nandavana Poove"	Deva	Vairamuthu	Anuradha Sriram
1998	Kumbakonam Gopalu	"Butter Fly Oh"	Ilaiyaraaja		Swarnalatha
1998	Kumbakonam Gopalu	"Super Pattu Mettu"	Ilaiyaraaja	Mu. Metha	Bhavatharini
1998	Veeram Vilanja Mannu	"Uthu Uthu Paakathinga"	Deva	Kasthuri Raja	Swarnalatha
1998	Simmarasi	"Vanathu Nilaveduthu"	S. A. Rajkumar	Kalai Kumar	Swarnalatha
1998	Unnudan	"Cochin Madapura"	Deva	Vairamuthu	Swarnalatha
1998	En Uyir Nee Thaane	"Symphony"	Deva		Harini
1998	Senthooram	"Aalamaram"	Ilayaraaja		Bhavatharini
1998	Kannedhirey Thondrinal	"Kanave Kalaiyadhe"	Deva	Vairamuthu	K. S. Chithra
1998	En Aasai Rasave	"Sola Kaattu Pathayila"	Kashturi Raja		Swarnalatha
1998	Unnidathil Ennai Koduthen	"Malligai Poove"	S. A. Rajkumar	Thamarai	Sujatha
1998	Unnidathil Ennai Koduthen	"Edho Oru"(Male)	S. A. Rajkumar	Ra. Ravishankar	
1998	Unnidathil Ennai Koduthen	"Kaatrukku Thudhuvittu"	S. A. Rajkumar	Kalaikumar	K. S. Chithra
1998	Priyamudan	"Bharathikku Kannamma"	Deva		
1998	Jeans	"Ennake Enakka"	A. R. Rahman	Vairamuthu	SPB Pallavi
1998	Jeans	"Poovukkul"	A. R. Rahman	Vairamuthu	Sujatha
1998	Kavalai Padathe Sagodhara	"Chinna Chinna"	Ilaiyaraaja		S. N. Surendar, Arunmozhi & Deepika
1998	Aval Varuvala	"Selaiyile Veedu"	S. A. Rajkumar	Palani Bharathi	K. S. Chithra
1998	Vettu Onnu Thundu Rendu	"Pudhuvaanam"	A. K. Vasagan		Sujatha Mohan
1998	Vettu Onnu Thundu Rendu	"Ponnamma"	A. K. Vasagan		
1998	Iniyavale	"Manja Manja"	Deva		
1998	Santhosham	"Sethu Mathava"	Deva	Agathiyan	Anuradha Sriram
1998	Ini Ellam Sugame	"Kangalilae"	Sirpy	Palani Bharathi	K. S. Chithra
1998	Thulli Thirintha Kaalam	"Tak Tak"	Jayanth		Sujatha Mohan
1998	Kangalin Vaarthaigal	"Indha Kadhal"	Ilaiyaraaja		Harini
1999	Thodarum	"Oru Thulir"	Ilaiyaraaja	Palani Bharathi	Bhavatharini
1999	Thullatha Manamum Thullum	"Innisai Paadivarum"(Male)	S. A. Rajkumar	Vairamuthu	
1999	Thullatha Manamum Thullum	"Innisai Paadivarum"(Sad)	S. A. Rajkumar	Vairamuthu	Chorus
1999	Ninaivirukkum Varai	"Sandhya Sandhya"	Deva	Palani Bharathi	
1999	Endrendrum Kadhal	"Nadodi Nanba"	Manoj Bhatnagar	Arivumathi	K. S. Chithra
1999	En Swasa Kaatre	"Thirakkadha"	A. R. Rahman	Vairamuthu	K. S. Chithra
1999	Ullathai Killathe	"Sona Sona Ruksona"	Deva	Palani Bharathi	Sujatha
1999	Chinna Durai	"Kolusu Konjam"	Ilaiyaraaja		Harini
1999	Monisha En Monalisa	"Kaadhale Kaadhale"	T. Rajendar	T. Rajendar	
1999	Poomagal Oorvalam	"Vaada Nannbane"	Siva		
1999	Poomagal Oorvalam	"Antha Vaanukku"	Siva		
1999	Poomagal Oorvalam	"Kannai Parikkira"	Siva		K. S. Chithra, Arunmozhi
1999	Vaalee	"Nilavai Konduva"	Deva	Vairamuthu	Anuradha Sriram
1999	Vaalee	"April Maathathil"	Deva	Vairamuthu	Harini
1999	Nenjinile	"Manase Manase"	Deva		K. S. Chithra
1999	Kadhalar Dhinam	"Roja Roja"	A. R. Rahman	Vaali	
1999	Sangamam	"Margazhi Thingal Allava"	A. R. Rahman	Vairamuthu	S. Janaki, Srimathumitha
1999	Suyamvaram	"Margazhi Maasathu"	S. A. Rajkumar	Palani Bharathi	S. P. Balasubrahmanyam, Mano, Swarnalatha, Sujatha
1999	Rojavanam	"Have Fallen"	Bharadwaj		Anuradha Sriram
1999	Nee Varuvai Ena	"Athikaalayil Sevalai"	S. A. Rajkumar	Ramesh Vaidya	Sujatha
1999	Anbulla Kadhalukku	"Gnyapagam Irukkutha"	Deva	Vairamuthu	Sujatha
1999	Nesam Pudhusu	"Kannorama Rosappoo"	C. R. Bobby	Yugabharathi	
1999	Maravathe Kanmaniye	"Ellora Oviyam"	Mahakumar		Sujatha, Anuradha Sriram
1999	Jayam	"Piranthom Thani Thaniye"	Pradeep Ravi		Amrutha
1999	Ooty	"Ooty Malai"	Deva	Pulamaipithan	Harini
1999	Pudhu Kudithanam	"Adi Sammatham"	Deva	Arivumathi	Anuradha Sriram
1999	Taj Mahal	"Kulirudhu Kulirudhu"	A. R. Rahman	Vairamuthu	Swarnalatha
1999	Thirupathi Ezhumalai Venkatesa	"Aasai Aasai"	S. A. Rajkumar	Rama Narayanan	
1999	Time	"Kadhal Neethana"	Ilaiyaraaja	Palani Bharathi	Sujatha
1999	Azhagarsamy	"Kaalamellam"	Deva	Palani Bharathi	
1999	Azhagarsamy	"Pogathey Pogathey"	Deva	Palani Bharathi	
1999	Sethu	"Maalai En Vedhanai"	Ilaiyaraaja	Arivumathi	Arunmozhi, S. N. Surendar
1999	Sethu	"Vidiya Vidiya"	Ilaiyaraaja	Mu. Metha	
1999	Sethu	"Sikkadha Sittondru"	Ilaiyaraaja	Palani Bharathi	Arunmozhi
1999	Chinna Raja	Anbe Anbe	Deva		
1999	Poovellam Kettuppar	Poove Poove"(Male)	Yuvan Shankar Raj	Pazhani Bharath	
1999	Poovellam Kettuppar	"Oh Senyoreeta"	Yuvan Shankar Raj	Pazhani Bharath	

=== 2000s ===
Year	Film	Song	Composer(s)	Writer(s)	Co-artist(s)
2000	Kadhal Rojave	"Ninaitha Varam"	Ilaiyaraaja	Palani Bharathi	Sunitha Upadrashta
2000	Kannukkul Nilavu	"Roja Poonthottam"	Ilaiyaraaja	Palani Bharathi	Anuradha Sriram
2000	Kannukkul Nilavu	"Enthen Kuyilenge"	Ilaiyaraaja	Palani Bharathi	Anuradha Sriram
2000	Good Luck	"Naane Nee Nee"	Manoj Bhatnagar		Sujatha Mohan
2000	Annai	"Chinna Chinna"	Dhina	Kadhal Mathi	Nithyasree Mahadevan
2000	Thai Poranthachu	"Ulagathil Ulla"	Deva	Pa. Vijay	Sujatha
2000	Mugavaree	"Poo Virinjaachu"	Deva	Vairamuthu	Anuradha Sriram
2000	Kakkai Siraginilae	"Gayathri Ketkum"	Ilaiyaraaja	R. V. Udayakumar	Bhavatharini
2000	Sandhitha Velai	"Vaa Vaa En Thalaivaa"	Deva	Vairamuthu	Harini
2000	Sandhitha Velai	"Pennkiliye"	Deva	Vairamuthu	Sujatha
2000	Kushi	"O Vennila"	Deva	Vairamuthu	Anuradha Sriram
2000	Unnai Kodu Ennai Tharuven	"Unnai Kodu"	S. A. Rajkumar	Pa. Vijay	K. S. Chithra
2000	Unnai Kodu Ennai Tharuven	"Satelliteil Yeri"	S. A. Rajkumar	Pa. Vijay	
2000	Karisakattu Poove	"Maamarathula"	Ilaiyaraaja	Kasthuri Raja	Bhavatharini
2000	Appu	"Vaada Vaa"	Deva	Vairamuthu	Mano
2000	Appu	"Idam Tharuvaya"	Deva	Vairamuthu	Pop Shalini
2000	Pennin Manathai Thottu	"Thyagarajarin"	S. A. Rajkumar		Nithyasree Mahadevan, S. A. Rajkumar, Febi Mani
2000	Pennin Manathai Thottu	"Kannukkulle Unnai"	S. A. Rajkumar		
2000	Kuberan	"Ananda Roja"	S. A. Rajkumar	Viveka	Sujatha, Swarnalatha
2000	Kuberan	"Kadhalikkum Pengalukku"	S. A. Rajkumar	Viveka	Anuradha Sriram
2000	Kuberan	"Nilavil Veedu"	S. A. Rajkumar	Viveka	Sujatha
2000	Kuberan	"Rosave Rosave"	S. A. Rajkumar	Viveka	
2000	Kuberan	"Vennilave"	S. A. Rajkumar	Viveka	Swarnalatha
2000	Doubles	"Adi Kadhal"	Srikanth Deva	Vairamuthu	Harini
2000	Parthen Rasithen	"Enakena Yerkanave"	Bharadwaj	Vairamuthu	Harini
2000	Kannaal Pesavaa	"Chinna Purave"	Deva	M. Raj Khanna	Anuradha Sriram
2000	Unnai Kann Theduthey	"Aaki Vecha"	Deva	Kalaikumar	S. Janaki
2000	Rhythm	"Kaatre En Vaasal"	A. R. Rahman	Vairamuthu	Kavita Krishnamurthy
2000	Ilaiyavan	"En Idhayam"	Ilaiyaraaja	Arivumathi	K. S. Chithra
2000	Kurukshetram (D)	"So So Sonnare"	Mani Sharma	Piraisoodan	Harini
2000	Kannukku Kannaga	"Anandam Anandam"	Deva	Vaali	
2000	Priyamanavale	"Azhage Azhage"	S. A. Rajkumar	Vaali	
2000	Seenu	"Dey Nandakumara"	Deva	Vaali	K. S. Chithra
2000	Seenu	"Paadukiren Oru Paattu"	Deva	Vaali	
2000	Manasu	"Orumurai Irumurai Palamurai"	Deva	Vairamuthu	K. S. Chithra
2000	Manasu	"Thendral Vanthu"	Deva	Vairamuthu	Sheela Shiva
2000	Ennavalle	"Ovvoru Paadalilum"	S. A. Rajkumar	Vairamuthu	
2000	Ennavalle	"Ovvoru Paadalilum (sad)"	S. A. Rajkumar	Vairamuthu	
2000	Manu Needhi	"Oru Roja"	Deva	Snehan	K. S. Chithra
2000	Nee Enthan Vaanam	"Yea Machakalai"	Sangeetha Rajan	Piraisoodan	Harini
2000	Relax (D)	Kannile Kaadhal"	Sandeep Chowta		Swarnalatha
2001	Vaanchinathan	"Adi Rendu Kaalulla"	Karthik Raja	Arivumathi	Bhavatharini
2001	Ullam Kollai Poguthey	"Anbe Anbe"	Karthik Raja	Pa. Vijay	
2001	Minnale	"Ivan Yaaro"	Harris Jayaraj	Thamarai	Harini
2001	Piriyadha Varam Vendum	"Vidaikodu Vidaikodu"	S. A. Rajkumar	Palani Bharathi	Swaranalatha
2001	Thaalikaatha Kaaliamman	"Laser Kathir Pole"	Sirpy	Pa. Vijay	Anuradha Sriram
2001	En Purushan Kuzhandhai Maadhiri	"Vennilaa"	Deva	Arivumathi	Sathya
2001	Paarvai Ondre Podhume	"Ye Asaindhadum"	Bharani	Pa. Vijay	S. Janaki
2001	Paarvai Ondre Podhume	"Thirumba Thirumba"	Bharani	Pa. Vijay	Harini
2001	Vinnukkum Mannukkum	"Aagaya Pookkal"	Sirpy	Viveka	Sujatha
2001	Dumm Dumm Dumm	"Un Perai Sonnale"	Karthik Raja	Arivumathi	Sadhana Sargam
2001	Asathal	"Velli Velli Mathappu"	Bharadwaj	Gangai Amaran	
2001	Sigamani Ramamani	"Yethaniyo Naadagangal"	Chandrabose	Muthulingam	
2001	Aanandham	"Pallanguzhiyin"	S. A. Rajkumar	Yugabharathi	Harini
2001	Kunguma Pottu Gounder	"Poovum Kaatrum"	Sirpy	Ra. Ravishankar	
2001	Kunguma Pottu Gounder	"Mudhal Mudhala"	Sirpy	Anuradha Sriram	
2001	Lovely	"Silver Nilave"	Deva	P. Vijay	Anuradha Sriram
2001	Dhill	"Un Samayal Arayil"	Vidyasagar	Kabilan	Sujatha
2001	Kanna Unnai Thedukiren	"Koyil Mani Kettenae"	Ilaiyaraaja	Arivumathi	Swarnalatha
2001	Nandhaa	"Or Aayiram Yaanai"	Yuvan Shankar Raja	Na. Muthu Kumar	
2001	Kadal Pookkal	"Paithiyamaanene"	Deva	Vairamuthu	Harini
2001	Majunu	"Mercury Mele"	Harris Jayaraj	Vairamuthu	Devan Ekambaram
2002	Azhagi	"Oru Sundari Vandhaalam"	Ilaiyaraaja	Palani Bharathi	Sadhana Sargam, Malgudi Subha
2002	Punnagai Desam	"Doli Doli"	S. A. Rajkumar	Pa. Vijay	Harish Raghavendra, Swarnalatha, Dr. Narayanan
2002	Punnagai Desam	"Kaatrile Paattu"	S. A. Rajkumar	Ra. Ravishankar	
2002	Saptham	"Vaanavil Vaanavil"	Gana-Lal		
2002	Dhaya	"Aan Azhaga"	Bharadwaj	Snehan	Sujatha
2002	Charlie Chaplin	"Mudhalam Santhippil"	Bharani	Pa. Vijay	Swarnalatha
2002	Kamarasu	"Chinna Chinna Kannukkulle"	S. A. Rajkumar	Muthulingam	K. S. Chithra
2002	Roja Koottam	"Putham Pudhu Rojave"	Bharadwaj	Vairamuthu	
2002	Indran (D)	Radhe Gopala"	Mani Sharma	Ponniyin Selvan	Sujatha
2002	Raajjiyam	"Ore Oru"	Bharadwaj	Snehan	Sujatha
2002	Thamizh	"Kannukkulle Kadhala"	Bharadwaj	Thamarai	Swarnalatha
2002	Junior Senior	"Anandam Pennukkulle"	Yuvan Shankar Raja	Pa. Vijay	
2002	Varushamellam Vasantham	"Adi Anarkali"	Sirpy	Ra. Ravishankar	Sujatha
2002	Varushamellam Vasantham	"Mudhal Mudhalai"	Sirpy	Ra. Ravishankar	Sujatha
2002	Thulluvadho Ilamai	"Theenda Theenda"	Yuvan Shankar Raja	Pa. Vijay	Bombay Jayashree
2002	Unnai Ninaithu	"Happy New Year"	Sirpy	Kalaikumar	Sujatha
2002	Unnai Ninaithu	"Sil Sil Silala"	Sirpy	Pa. Vijay	Sujatha
2002	Unnai Ninaithu	"Pombalainga Kadhal"	Sirpy	Pa. Vijay	Manikka Vinayagam
2002	Enge Enadhu Kavithai	"Irumanam Sernthu"	Bharadwaj	Snehan	
2002	Yai Nee Romba Azhaga Irukke	"Poi Sollalam"	Murugan	Snehan	Anuradha Sriram
2002	Guruvamma	"Odivantha Oothu"	Sahitya	Arivumathi	
2002	Ivan	"Appadi Paakaruthenna"	Ilaiyaraaja	Palani Bharathi	Mathangi Jagdish
2002	Naina	"Pallikoodam Sellum"	Sabesh–Murali	Pa. Vijay	Harini
2002	Sundhara Travels	"En Nenjukkul Veesiya"	Bharani	Pa. Vijay	
2002	King	"Kadhalagi Kadhalagi"	Dhina	Vairamuthu	Sujatha
2002	Arputham	"Nee Malara Malara"	Shiva	Snehan	K. S. Chithra
2002	Samasthanam	"Penne Penne"	Deva	Na. Muthukumar	Harini, Tippu, Ganga
2002	Samasthanam	"Malaraai Malaraai"	Deva	Pa. Vijay	
2002	Five Star	"Rayile Rayile"	Sriram Parasuram	Snehan	
2002	Kadhal Azhivathillai	"Paarkadha Podhu"	T. Rajendar	T. Rajendar	Silambarasan
2002	Ramanaa	"Vaanam Adhirave"	Ilaiyaraaja	Palani Bharathi	Sadhana Sargam, Bhavatharini
2002	Gummalam	"Ovvoru Naalum"	Gandhidasan	Snehan	
2002	Mutham	"Oru Murai Nee Yennai"	Bharani	Pa. Vijay	S. A. Chandrasekhar
2002	Bala	"Theendi Theendi"	Yuvan Shankar Raja	Pa. Vijay	Sujatha
2002	Kadhal Virus	"Sonnalum Ketpadhillai"	A. R. Rahman	Vaali	Harini
2002	Style	"Unakku Enna"	Bharani	Snehan	
2002	Style	"Kadithamillai"	Bharani	Snehan	
2002	Style	"Varuiral En"	Bharani	Snehan	
2002	Virumbugiren	"Pathala Pathala"	Deva	Vairamuthu	Ceylon Manohar, Subha, Saisan
2003	Chokka Thangam	"Enna Nenache"	Deva	R. V. Udayakumar	Anuradha Sriram
2003	Ramachandra	"Chinna Chinna"	Deva	Pa. Vijay	Sujatha
2003	Kadhaludan	"Unnai Thinam"	S. A. Rajkumar	Kalidasan	Prasanna
2003	Student Number 1	"Kadhal Natpai Maruma"	M. M. Keeravani	Na. Muthukumar	Anuradha Sriram
2003	Kadhal Sadugudu	"Putham Puthiyada"	Deva	Vairamuthu	Sadhana Sargam
2003	Banda Paramasivam	"Tajmahal"	Sirpy	Ra. Ravikumar	Sujatha
2003	Well Done	"Kuyil Koovuthu"	Vidyasagar	Na. Muthukumar	Sujatha
2003	Parasuram	"Muppadhu Nimidam"	A. R. Rahman	Vairamuthu	Sujatha
2003	Kadhal Kondein	"Nenjodu Kalandhidu"	Yuvan Shankar Raja	Na. Muthukumar	Sujatha
2003	Thithikudhe	"Mainave Mainave"	Vidyasagar	Vairamuthu	Sadhana Sargam
2003	Thithikudhe	"Thayaarum Ariyamal"	Vidyasagar	Vairamuthu	
2003	Success	"Kanna Un"	Deva	Vaali	Anuradha Sriram
2003	Anjaneya	"Aga Porula"	Mani Sharma	Vairamuthu	Sujatha
2003	Konji Pesalaam	"Siru Siru"	Ilaiyaraaja	Muthulingam	
2003	Indru	"Salwar Poovanam"	Deva	Na. Muthukumar	
2003	Sindhamal Sitharamal	"Vaanavillin"	Bharani	Snehan	Mahathi
2004	Ullathai Killathe	"Sona Sona Rexona"	Deva	Palani Bharathi	Sujatha
2004	Kadhal Dot Com	"Unna Enakku"	Bharadwaj	Snehan	Anuradha Sriram
2004	Ahalya	"Ahalya Yengal Ahalya"	D. Imman	Vairamuthu	Anuradha Krishnamoorthy
2004	Maanasthan	"Pattu Jarikai"	S. A. Rajkumar	Kalaikumar	Mano
2004	New	"Kaalaiyil Dinamum"	A. R. Rahman	Vaali	Sadhana Sargam
2004	Arivumani	"Pagal Thiruda"	Janakiraj	Kalaikumar	Anuradha Sriram
2004	Oru Murai Sollividu	"Eppadi Solvathu"	Bharadwaj	Thamarai	Chinmayi
2004	7G Rainbow Colony	"Naam Vayathukku"	Yuvan Shankar Raja	Na. Muthukumar	Yuvan Shankar Raja, Pop Shalini, Ganga Sitharasu
2004	Neranja Manasu	"Muthukulichi"	Karthik Raja	Vaali	Manjari
2004	Dreams	"Oh Penne"	Bharadwaj	Kasthuri Raja	
2005	Priyasakhi	"Anbu Alaipayuthey"	Bharadwaj	Snehan	Karthik, Reshmi
2005	Ullam Ketkume	"Mazhai Mazhai"	Harris Jayaraj	Vairamuthu	Harini
2005	New	"Kaalaiyil Dinamum"	A. R. Rahman	Vaali	Sadhana Sargam
2006	Thambi	"Sudum Nilavu"	Vidyasagar	Vairamuthu	Harini
2006	Kedi	"Kungumam Kalainthathe"	Yuvan Shankar Raja	Pa. Vijay	
2006	Nenjil Jil Jil	"Unakkagathaane"	D. Imman	Pa. Vijay	Sujatha, Solar Sai
2007	Aalwar	"Pallaandu"	Srikanth Deva	Vaali	Senthildas
2007	Vegam	"Kalathara"	Rajesh Vaidhya	Vairamuthu	Anuradha Shekar
2008	Kasimedu Govindan	"Anandhanthan"	Soundaryan	Snehan	Swarnalatha
2008	Vaitheeswaran	"Mudhal Mudhal"	Srikanth Deva	Thamarai	Sujatha
2009	Aadhavan	"Vaarayo Vaarayo"	Harris Jayaraj	Kabilan	Chinmayi, Megha

=== 2010s ===
Year	Film	Song	Composer(s)	Writer(s)	Co-artist(s)
2010	Bale Pandiya	"Kangale Kamalalayam"	Devan Ekambaram	Thamarai	Mrinalini
2011	Narthagi	"Vaan Mazhaiyin Thuligal"	G. V. Prakash Kumar	Na. Muthukumar	Sudha Raghunathan
2013	Muthu Nagaram	"Anbana Oru Varthai Amma…"	Kavinpa	Jayamurasu	
2014	Ramanujan	"Vinkadantha"	Ramesh Vinayakam	Thirumalisai Alvar	Pop Shalini, Sowmya
2014	Nalanum Nandhiniyum	"Kadhal Veesum"	Ashwath Naganathan	Na. Muthukumar	
2015	Nannbenda	"Oorellam Unnai Kandu"	Harris Jayaraj	Vairamuthu	Bombay Jayashree
2015	Charles Shafiq Karthiga	"Undhan Mugam (Composer's Version)"	Sidhartha Mohan	S. Sathiyamoorthy	Vandana Srinivasan
2018	Santhoshathil Kalavaram	"Kaala Kaalam Kadhal Kaalam"	Sivanag	Kabilan	Chinmayi

== Telugu songs ==
=== 1990s ===
Year	Film	Song	Composer(s)	Co-artist(s)
1994	Premikudu	"O Cheliya"	A. R. Rahman	
1994	Vanitha	"Sirimalle Mogga Meeda"	A. R. Rahman	K. S. Chithra
1995	Aasha Aasha Aasha	"Mellaga"(Male)	Deva	
1995	Aasha Aasha Aasha	"Chilakammaa"	Deva	Anuradha Sriram
1995	Aasha Aasha Aasha	"Mellaga"(Humming)	Deva	K. S. Chithra
1995	Server Sundharam Gari Abbayi	"Tholakarilo Chinukante"	AS Geetha Krishna	Swarnalatha
1996	Prema Lekha	"Nee Pilupe Prema"	Deva	K. S. Chithra
1996	Prema Desham	"Vennela"	A. R. Rahman	Mano
1996	Prema Desham	"O Vennela"	A. R. Rahman	
1996	Love Birds	"Repe Lokam Mugisenante"	A. R. Rahman	Sujatha Mohan
1996	Merupu	"Paruvaala Silpam"	Bharadwaj	Anuradha Sriram
1996	Ajay	"Naa Jabili"	Anand–Milind	
1997	Arundhathi	"Sirimuvva Ghal Ghal"	M. M. Keeravani	K. S. Chithra
1997	Illaalu	"Aada Janmamulona"	Vandemataram Srinivas	
1997	Evandi Manammaye	"Aakaasha Veedhullo"	Koti	Sangeetha
1997	Ugadhi	"Preyasi Navve"	S. V. Krishna Reddy	K. S. Chithra
1997	Ugadhi	"Choosa Oka Maaru"	S. V. Krishna Reddy	Sunitha
1997	Ugadhi	"Innallu Ee Mabbullo"	S. V. Krishna Reddy	
1997	Ugadhi	"Daddy Katha Vinava"	S. V. Krishna Reddy	Sunitha
1997	Ugadhi	"Naa Paate Hoyna Hoyna"	S. V. Krishna Reddy	Prasanna Kumar
1997	Ugadhi	"Entha Andhanga"	S. V. Krishna Reddy	Sunitha
1997	Iddaru	"Sasivadane"	A. R. Rahman	Bombay Jayashri
1997	50-50	"Ee Praayam Needhe Ra"	A. R. Rahman	K. S. Chithra
1997	Rakshakudu	"Soniya Soniya"	A. R. Rahman	Harini, Udit Narayan
1997	Ullaasam	"Kondamalli Puvve"	Karthik Raja	Harini
1997	Ullaasam	"Veeche Gaalulaku"	Karthik Raja	Harini
1997	Egire Paavurama	"Gunde Gootiki"	S. V. Krishna Reddy	Sunitha
1997	Mukha Mukhi	"Manavi Aalakinchara"(Male)	Deva	
1997	Raasi	"Challa Challani Pilla"	Sirpy	K. S. Chithra
1997	Raasi	"Chinnari Chellela"	Sirpy	Mano
1997	Prema Prema	"Prema Prema"	Hamsalekha	
1998	Tholi Prema	"Romance Rhythms"	Deva	
1998	Hrudayanjali	"Edapai Jarina"	A. R. Rahman	K. S. Chithra
1998	Paradesi	"Teluginti Peratilona"	M. M. Keeravani	K. S. Chithra
1998	Paradesi	"Bondumalli"	M. M. Keeravani	Mano, Swarnalatha
1998	Jeans	"Povullo Daagunna"	A. R. Rahman	Sujatha Mohan
1998	Jeans	"Haira Haira"	A. R. Rahman	SP Pallavi
1998	Aahaa	"Suvvi Suvvamma"	Vandemataram Srinivas	Sujatha Mohan
1998	Greeku Veerudu	"Baapu Geesina"	Deva	Sujatha Mohan
1998	Jolly	"Edho Cheppali"	Kavi	Swarnalatha
1998	Jolly	"Snehaniki Swagathamai"	Kavi	S. P. Sailaja
1998	Maavidaakulu	"Aagadhe Aakali"	Koti	Swarnalatha
1998	Neeli Meghalu	"Chinna Papa Navvu"	Duggirala	
1998	Pelli Peetalu	"Yamuna Tarangam"	S. V. Krishna Reddy	SP Pallavi
1998	Prema Pallaki	"Panchama Swaragathilo"	Krishna - Neeraj	SPB
1998	Prema Pallaki	"Nuvvu Vunte Chaalu"	Krishna - Neeraj	
1998	Satya	"Naathone Vunnavu"	Vishal Bhardwaj	Sujatha Mohan
1998	Abhishekam	"Naalo Ninu Chusukoga"	S. V. Krishna Reddy	Sunitha
1998	Abhishekam	"Singapore Jambo Jet"	S. V. Krishna Reddy	
1998	Koteeswarudu	"Jolapaadina Koyila"	Agosh	
1999	Hello Friend	"Hello Friend"(Male)	S. A. Rajkumar	
1999	Hello My Dear Monisha	"Ashala Ashala"	T. Rajendar	
1999	Manasulo Maata	"Hai Hai"	S. V. Krishna Reddy	K. S. Chithra
1999	Prema Kosam	"Nijamena Ee Prabhatham"	Raj	Swarnalatha
1999	Premante Pranamistha	"Tholisari Thalapulu"	A. R. Rahman	K. S. Chithra
1999	Premikula Roju	"Roja Roja"	A. R. Rahman	
1999	Premikula Roju	"Roja Roja{Sad}"	A. R. Rahman	
1999	Raja	"Kannula Logililo"	S. A. Rajkumar	K. S. Chithra
1999	Vaalee	"April Maasamlo"	Deva	Harini
1999	Vaalee	"Ningine Dinchala"	Deva	Anuradha Sriram
1999	Time	"Premenantava"	Ilaiyaraaja	Sujatha Mohan
1999	Premaku Velayera	"Ippatikippudu"	S. V. Krishna Reddy	K. S. Chithra
1999	Prema Gharshana	"Iruvadhi Vayasuvaraku"	Deva	K. S. Chithra
1999	Maa Balaji	"Gup Chup Roi"	Vandemataram Srinivas	
1999	Premalo Paddanu	"Sandhya O Sandhya"	Deva	
1999	Kaama	"Sonali Sonali"	Adithyan	Anuradha Sriram

=== 2000s ===
Year	Film	Song	Composer(s)	Writer(s)	Co-artist(s)
2000	Kalisundam Raa	"Prema Prema"	S. A. Rajkumar	Sirivennela Siyaramasastri	
2000	Maa Annayya	"Maina Emainave"	S. A. Rajkumar		K. S. Chithra
2000	Bachi	"O Chilaka"	Chakri		Kousalya
2000	Rhythm	"Gaale Naa Vaakitakoche"	A. R. Rahman		Kavita Krishnamurti
2000	Antha Mana Manchike	"Dabuchidadam Bolare"	K.Veeru		
2000	Antha Mana Manchike	"Cha Cha Chikichacha"	K.Veeru		
2000	Antha Mana Manchike	"Vegam Vegam"	K.Veeru		K. S. Chithra
2000	Maharani	"Sarasaku"	Deva		
2000	Maharani	"Bhai Avunanara"	Deva		
2000	Bagunnara	"O Priyathama"	Deva		Harini
2000	Uncle	"Uncle Uncle Little Star"	Vandemataram Srinivas		
2000	Uncle	"Guitariai Ne Paadana"	Vandemataram Srinivas		
2000	Maa Pelliki Randi	"Mama Chandamama"	S. A. Rajkumar		K. S. Chithra
2000	Manasu Paddanu Kaani	"Puvva Puvva"	K Veeru		Sunitha
2000	Chirunaama	"Oy Vodi Panchu"	Deva		Anuradha Sriram
2000	Preyasi Nannu Preminchu	"Thyaagarajuni"	S. A. Rajkumar		
2000	Bose	"Maanava Janme"	S. A. Rajkumar		K. S. Chithra
2000	Durga	"Sogasariki Haarame"	SD Shantha Kumar		Swarnalatha
2001	6 Teens	"Stella Model Sexy Focus"	Ghantadi Krishna		
2001	Akka Baavekkada	"Hysalakka"	S. A. Rajkumar		
2001	Ammayi Kosam	"Oho Hatsoff"	Vandemataram Srinivas		
2001	Andhaala O Chilaka	"Raagala Eevela"	Ghantadi Krishna		
2001	Budget Padmanabham	"Bava Bava"	S. V. Krishna Reddy		
2001	Chandu	"Veyi Janmala Asha"	K Veeru		Sadhana Sargam
2001	Chinna	"Abba Hairabba"	S. A. Rajkumar		Swarnalatha
2001	Chinna	"Oka Chitramaina"	S. A. Rajkumar		Sujatha Mohan
2001	Cheli	"Ningilo Jaabili Andham"	Harris Jayaraj		Harini
2001	Jabili	"Chiguraaku Yevaro"	S. V. Krishna Reddy		K. S. Chithra
2001	Jabili	"Vayasu Thalupu"	S. V. Krishna Reddy		
2001	Love In America	"Yevaru Neevu Yevaro Nenu"	Mano Murthy		
2001	Ninnu Choodalani	"Emaindo Emogaani"	S. A. Rajkumar		Harini
2001	Sampangi	"Sampangi"	Ghantadi Krishna		
2001	Vechivunta	"Reppalu Moosunna"	Aakash		
2001	Wife	"Chaitrama Nee Chirunama"	Ghantadi Krishna		Harini
2002	Adrustam	"Vayasa Vayasa"	Dhina		Sujatha Mohan
2002	Dreams	"En Cheyamantavu"	Chakri		
2002	Lahiri Lahiri Lahirilo	"Lahiri Lahiri Lahirilo"	M. M. Keeravani		Sunitha
2002	Malli Malli Chudali	"Vennelalo"	Yuvan Shankar Raja		
2002	Neethone Vuntanu	"Pongi Pongi Pothundhi"	Vandemataram Srinivas		
2002	Red	"November Maasam"	Deva		
2002	Red	"Amma Vadi Yentha"	Deva		
2002	Rendu Gundela Chappudu	"Oka Sari Modalaithe"	Aakash		
2002	Seshu	"Merisi Merisi"	Yuvan Shankar Raja		
2002	Vachina Vaadu Suryudu	"Saare Jahanse Acha"	Gopi Radha		
2002	Prema Sakshiga	"Nuvvu Naadhanivai"	Bunty - Maruth		K. S. Chithra
2002	Savvadi	"Nannu Naaku Parichayam"	Raghu Kowshik		Lenina Chowdary
2002	Nandha	"O Rasika"	Bharadwaj		
2002	Nandha	"Varichelu Pakkana"	Bharadwaj		Sujatha Mohan
2003	Abhimanyu	"Chinnavaalla Manasula"	Mani Sharma		
2003	Istapadi	"Tholi Premaku Atham Nuvve"	M. M. Keeravani		
2003	Nee Manasu Naaku Telusu	"Snehitude Unte"	A. R. Rahman		
2003	Pawan Subbalakshmi	"Naa Choopu"	Sritrinath		
2003	Police Karthavyam	"Matthulo Vayase"	A. R. Rahman		
2003	Uthsaham	"Prema Prema"	Anurag		
2003	Villain	"Naa Gunde Gudilo"	Vidyasagar		
2003	Maa Bava Bangaram	"Chinni Chilaka"	Deva		
2003	Maa Bava Bangaram	"Thella Thellani Navvu"	Deva		
2004	7G Brundavan Colony	"Mem Vayasuku"	Yuvan Shankar Raja		
2004	Aithe Enti	"Nuvve Naaku Lokamani"	Ghantadi Krishna		
2004	Arjun	"Madhura Madhura"	Mani Sharma		
2004	Naani	"Pedave Palikina"	A. R. Rahman		
2004	Prema Chadarangam	"Aaryula Hrudayapu"	Harris Jayaraj		
2004	Sattha	"Nindu Jaabili"	Narasimha		
2004	Premante Maadhe	"Oohalake"	M. M. Srilekha		Harini
2005	Dhana 51	"Ounanave Ounani Anave"	Chakri		
2005	Good Boy	"Tholisaari Tholakariga"	Vandemataram Srinivas		
2005	Preminchi Choodu	"Shodhinchuko"	Harris Jayaraj		
2005	Seenugadu Chiranjeevi Fan	"Saage Neeli Megham"	Siva Kakani		K. S. Chithra
2005	Youth	"Ee Vasantha Velalo"	Ramana Ogeti		Nishma
2006	Godavari	"Manasa Vacha"	K. M. Radha Krishnan		K. S. Chithra
2006	Jadoo	"Vidhi Oka Vaipu"	Yuvan Shankar Raja		
2006	Sainikudu	"Maayera Maayera"	Harris Jayaraj		
2006	Varnam	"O Madhurama"	Krishna		K. S. Chithra
2006	Seenu Care Of Anu	"Bantunai Nenunta"(Male)	Vandemataram Srinivas		
2007	Anumanaspadam	"Prathi Dhinam Nee Darsanam"	Ilaiyaraaja		
2007	Paata	"Naa Hrudayam"	SA Kuddhos		
2008	Ardham Chesukoru	"Kaliki Nee Premane"	Ravi Mulakapalli		
2008	Vinayakudu	"Saradaga Ee Samayam"	Sam Prasan		K. S. Chithra
2009	Konchem Ishtam Konchem Kashtam	"Enduku Chentaki"	Shankar–Ehsaan–Loy		

=== 2010s ===
Year	Film	Song	Composer(s)	Writer(s)	Co-artist(s)
2011	Rangam	"Namali Kulukula"	Harris Jayaraj		Shweta Mohan
2013	Traffic	"Kalale"(Duet)	Mejo Joseph		Chinmayi
2013	Jagadguru Adi Shankara	"Akhila Charachara"	Nag Sri Vatsa		
2014	Vikramasimha	"Yedemaina"(Male)	A. R. Rahman	Ananta Sriram	
2014	Nene	"Ninne Ninne"	Harris Jayaraj	Vanamali	Chinmayi
2015	O Manasa	"Ayuvichi"	Ms.Sahaja Rao	Vanamali	
2018	Ala	"Marapuraka"	Srinivasa Sarma Rana	Shiva Krishna	

=== 2020s ===
Year	Film	Song	Composer(s)	Writer(s)	Co-artist(s)
2020	MAD	"Kanapaduna"	Mohith Rahmaniac	Lakshmi Priyanka	
2022	Connect	"Ney Geesina Gaganam"	Prithvi Chandrashekar		Uthara Unnikrishnan
2024	Darshini	"O Manasa"	Nizhani Anjan	Chinni Krishna	

== Kannada songs ==
=== 1990s ===
Year	Film	Song	Composer(s)	Writer(s)	Co-artist(s)
1997	Bhoomi Geetha	"Goro Gorookana"	Ilaiyaraaja	K. Kalyan	
1998	Thutta Mutta	"Thaare Thaare"	Hamsalekha		
1998	Thutta Mutta	"Muttu Kodolu"	Hamsalekha		
1999	Idu Entha Premavayya	"Ninna Aasegale"	Gurukiran	D. Bharath	K. S. Chithra

=== 2000s ===
Year	Film	Song	Composer(s)	Writer(s)	Co-artist(s)
2001	Banallu Neene Buviyallu Neene	"A Aa Amma Embude"	Prashanth Raj	S. Narayan	
2001	Jipuna Nanna Ganda	"Kanasina Hakki"	Sadhu Kokila	Srichandru	
2001	Vaalee	"Vasantha Maasadalli"	Rajesh Ramanath	K. Kalyan	Anuradha Sriram
2001	Vaalee	"Chandirana Hididu"	Rajesh Ramanath	K. Kalyan	Anuradha Sriram
2001	Vande Matharam	"Sandal Wood Huduga"	Deva		Swarnalatha
2001	Vande Matharam	"Thayya Thakka Tha"	Deva		Krishnaraj, Anuradha Sriram
2002	Majestic	Muddu Manase"	Sadhu Kokila	V. Nagendra Prasad	
2002	Dhruva	Cheluvina Chakori"	Gurukiran	V. Nagendra Prasad	K. S. Chithra
2002	Dhruva	"O Vidhiye"	Gurukiran	Kaviraj	
2003	Hearts Beats	"Bannagala Hosaloka"	Venkat Narayan	V. Nagendra Prasad	Badri
2004	Darshan	Manase Manase"	Sadhu Kokila	K. Kalyan	Nanditha
2004	Baa Baaro Rasika	"Hotthu Gotthu"	Mahesh	Manjunath Rao	
2004	Nalla	"Gap Chup"	Venkat Narayan	V. Nagendra Prasad	
2004	Om Ganesh	"Ninna Kannalli"	M N Krupakar		
2005	O Gulabiye	"Manase Mannisu"	M N Krupakar	K. Kalyan	K. S. Chithra
2005	Rishi	"Laali Laali"	Gurukiran	Kaviraj	K. S. Chithra
2005	Deadly Soma	"Hey Hasivendarenu"	Sadhu Kokila	V. Nagendra Prasad	Kavita Krishnamurthy

=== 2010s ===
Year	Film	Song	Composer(s)	Writer(s)	Co-artist(s)
2010	Janani	"Suvvali Suvvalaali"	Asif Ali	K. Kalyan	Bombay Jayashri
2011	Vinayaka Geleyara Balaga	"Yaarivalee Hudugi"	V. Harikrishna	V. Nagendra Prasad	Vani Harikrishna
2011	Taare	"Manasaare"	C. R. Bobby	Hrudaya Shiva	K. S. Chithra

== Malayalam songs ==
Year	Film	Song	Composer(s)	Writer(s)	Co-artist(s)
1993	Bandhukkal Sathrukkal	"Marugelara"	Sreekumaran Thampi	Thyagaraja	
1995	Mangalam Veettil Manaseswari Gupta	"Yaamini"	Johnson	Gireesh Puthenchery	K. S. Chithra
1995	Kusruthikaatu	"Ilamaan Mizhiyil"	Tomin Thachankary	Gireesh Puthenchery	K. S. Chithra
1996	Devaraagam	"Ya Ya Ya Yadava"	M. M. Keeravani	M. D. Rajendran	K. S. Chithra
1996	Sulthan Hyderali	"Sada Nin"	Rajamani	Kaithapram	Swarnalatha
1996	Dilliwala Rajakumaran	"Kalahapriye Nin Mizhikalil"	Ouseppachan	S. Ramesan Nair	K. S. Chithra
1997	Lelam	"Kunkumamo"	Ouseppachan	Gireesh Puthenchery	K. S. Chithra
1997	Mangalya Pallakku	"Pularvana Panthalorukki"	Balabhaskar	Gireesh Puthenchery	
1999	Devadasi	"Divaaswapnam"	Sharreth		K. S. Chithra
1999	Devadasi	"Devee Hridayaraagam"	Sharreth		K. S. Chithra
1999	Devadasi	"Sudhamanthram"			
2000	Monisha Ente Monalisa (D)	"Rakile Rakile"	T. Rajendar	Poovachal Khader	
2001	One Man Show	"Kaashithumba Poove"	Suresh Peters	Kaithapram	
2001	One Man Show	"Kaashithumba Poove (D)"	Suresh Peters	Kaithapram	Swarnalatha
2001	Red Indians	"Kalahapriye Nin Mizhikalil"	S. P. Venkitesh	Gireesh Puthenchery	K. S. Chithra
2003	Shingari Bolona	"Silayazhakku"	Mohan Sithara	Kaithapram	
2005	Otta Nanayam	"En Shwaasame"	S. P. Venkitesh	ONV Kurup	Sujatha
2009	Seetha Kalyanam	"Brovabharaama Raghuraama"	Srinivas	S. Ramesan Nair	
2009	Meghatheertham	"Shaaradha"	Sharreth	Gireesh Puthenchery	Priya Himesh
2009	Super	"Kalamozhiyival Chirikkumbol"	Yuvan Shankar Raja	Kailas Rishi	
2012	Ithra Maathram	"Ezhuthidunnu Vaniyil"	Jaison J Nair	Rafeeq Ahamed	
2017	Kaattu	"Ekayaay Neeyinnente"	Deepak Dev	Rafeeq Ahamed	
2019	Kurukshetra (D)	"Aajanu Bahu"	V. Harikrishna	Mangop Gopalakrishnan	

== Hindi songs ==
Year	Film	Song	Composer(s)	Writer(s)	Co-artist(s)
2006	Aparichit (D)	"Kumari"	Harris Jayaraj	Mehboob Kotwal	Harini

== Serial songs ==
Year	Series	Song	Composer(s)	Writer(s)	Co-artist(s)
1997	Premi	Title song			Anuradha Sriram
2000	Irandam Chanakyan	Title song	Guhaprasath		
2001	Junior Senior	"Junior Senior"	Yuvan Shankar Raja		
2001	Anbu Manam	"Anbu Ennum"			
2004	Ahalya	"Ahalya Engal Ahalya"	D. Imman		
2006	Viswaroopam	Engeyum Eppothum	Guhaprasath		
