= Sura (film) =

2010 Indian film by S. P. Rajkumar

- Theatrical release poster
- Directed by: S. P. Rajkumar
- Written by: S. P. Rajkumar
- Produced by: Sangili Murugan
- Starring: Vijay; Tamannaah Bhatia
- Cinematography: N. K. Ekambaram
- Edited by: Don Max
- Music by: Mani Sharma
- Production company: Murugan Cine Arts
- Distributed by: Sun Pictures
- Release date: 30 April 2010
- Running time: 173 minutes
- Country: India
- Language: Tamil
- Box office: est. ₹15 crore

Sura (transl. Shark) is a 2010 Indian Tamil-language action comedy film written and directed by S. P. Rajkumar, starring Vijay in the title role along with Tamannaah Bhatia, Dev Gill and Vadivelu in supporting roles. The film, produced by Sangili Murugan and distributed by Sun Pictures, features soundtrack and score composed by Mani Sharma. Cinematography was handled by N. K. Ekambaram and M. S. Prabhu, respectively and editing was handled by Don Max. The film was the 50th film of Vijay. The film tells the story of a fisherman battling a cruel, greedy and corrupt minister to save land for his hamlet's homes. It tracks Sura's journey as he secures the land and foils the minister's plans.

It was theatrically released worldwide on 30 April 2010. The film was critically panned and became a box office bomb.

== Plot ==
In the picturesque coastal town of Yaazh Nagar, a fisherman hamlet in Tamil Nadu, Sura, a brave and compassionate young man, grows up with his loyal friend, Ambar La, known affectionately as Umbrella. Sura is known for his good deeds and selflessness in helping his fellow villagers, earning him admiration and respect from all around.

Meanwhile, a heartbroken young woman named Poornima arrives in Yaazh Nagar, seeking solace after the tragic loss of her beloved pet dog, Ramesh. Overwhelmed with grief and struggling to find purpose, Poornima is drawn to Sura's kindness and finds comfort in his presence. As they spend time together, a genuine connection forms between them, and they fall deeply in love.

Enter Samuthira Raja, a ruthless, corrupt minister with a sinister agenda. Samuthira Raja desires to seize control of Yaazh Nagar's beautiful coastal land to build a grand fairground, exploiting the villagers' simplicity and innocence for his own gains. He employs every crooked tactic in the book, using his political power to threaten and intimidate the villagers.

Sura, however, refuses to be bullied into submission. He becomes the voice of resistance and leads the villagers in fighting back against Samuthira Raja's malicious intentions. In a thrilling series of events, Sura takes on Samuthira Raja's cronies single-handedly, showcasing his intelligence, resourcefulness, and unparalleled bravery. With the support of the villagers, Sura outsmarts the corrupt minister and saves their homes and livelihoods.

But Samuthira Raja is not one to accept defeat easily. Consumed by his lust for vengeance, he devises a diabolical plan to eliminate Sura once and for all. He plants a deadly bomb in Yaazh Nagar, intending to destroy the entire village and Sura with it. In a heart-stopping confrontation, Samuthira Raja captures Sura, gloating over his impending victory.

However, Sura reveals a startling truth that leaves Samuthira Raja dumbfounded – the chief guest for the hamlet's upcoming inauguration is none other than Samuthira Raja's wife, a compassionate and kind-hearted woman unaware of her husband's evil deeds. This revelation sends shockwaves through Samuthira Raja, questioning his actions and his moral compass.

Faced with a dilemma, Samuthira Raja is torn between his thirst for revenge and the possibility of redemption through his wife's innocence. As the clock ticks, Sura urges decides to step in himself and defuse the bomb that’s on the other boat. Yet, Raja refuses to spare Sura despite him saving a lot of people including his own family, and orders his men to kill him. Sura however fights them off and kills Raja. At the end, Sura marries Poornima and lives happily ever after with his village people who now have a house for themselves.

== Cast ==
- Vijay as Sura
- Tamannaah Bhatia as Poornima
- Dev Gill as Samuthira Raja / Sundaram
- Vadivelu as Umbrella
- Sujatha Sivakumar as Sura's mother
- Sriman as Dhandapani
- Riyaz Khan as Das
- Ilavarasu as Samuthira Raja's sidekick
- Yuvarani as Sundaram's wife
- Radha Ravi as church father
- Vennira Aadai Moorthy as Bhagavathar
- Madhan Bob as Poornima's father
- Mahanadi Shankar as Kandhu Vatti Govinda
- Muthukaalai as Umbrella's sidekick
- Comagan as pen seller
- Suruli Manohar as bystander advising CPR
- Kottachi as bystander in police station
- Thadi Balaji as a fake policeman
- Karate Raja as accused
- Suryakanth as police officer
- Chelladurai as boat race referee
- Karnaa Radha as police officer
- Venkatesan as police officer
- Boys Rajan as collector

Uncredited

- King Kong as a fake policeman
- Halwa Vasu as Umbrella's sidekick
- Meesai Rajendranath as police inspector
- Vengal Rao as drummer

Cameo appearance

- Robert in the song "Naan Nadanthal Athiradi"

== Production ==
After the completion of Vettaikaaran (2009), Vijay announced that his 50th film was to be named as Urimaikural named after M. G. Ramachandran starrer of same name but it was titled as Sura. Many directors were reportedly considered for the film: Selvaraghavan, S. P. Rajkumar, K. V. Anand, Dharani, Prabhu Deva, Siddique, Mohan Raja, R. Madhesh, and Perarasu. Perarasu was initially selected as director, but S. P. Rajkumar, who directed Azhagar Malai (2009) was selected as director. Prior to this, Rajkumar previously worked in Vijay starrer Once More (1997) as a dialogue writer. In mid-2009, Tamannaah Bhatia was confirmed to be the lead actress.

While M. S. Prabhu was the main cinematographer, Ilavarasu worked as the cinematographer for a scene featuring Vadivelu. During the shooting, Prabhu and Rajakumar had a misunderstanding and he was replaced by N. K. Ekambaram.

== Music ==
Sura

Soundtrack album by Mani Sharma
- Released: 29 March 2010
- Recorded: 2010
- Genre: Feature film soundtrack
- Length: 28:06
- Labels: Sony Music India; Think Music
- Producer: Mani Sharma

Mani Sharma chronology
Maanja Velu (2010)	Sura (2010)	Varudu (2010)

The soundtrack of the film, composed by Mani Sharma, was released on 29 March 2010 at Lady Aandal Venkat Subbarao School. The album features six songs all of which have been reused from his previous films. "Vetri Kodi Yethu", "Vanga Kadal Ellai", "Siragadikkum Nilavu", "Thamizhan Veera Thamizhan", "Thanjavoor Jillakkari", and "Naan Nadanthal Athiradi" are based on the Telugu songs "Inthe Inthinthe", "Nuvvasalu", "Tagilinadi Rabba", "Hut Hutja", "Bommali" and "My Name Is Billa", respectively.

Track listing
No.	Title	Lyrics	Singer(s)	Length
1.	"Vetri Kodi Yethu"	Vaali, S.P. Rajkumar	Ranjith, Mukesh	5:21
2.	"Siragadikkum Nilavu"	Snehan	Karthik, Rita Thyagarajan	4:27
3.	"Vanga Kadal Ellai"	Kabilan	Naveen Madhav, Malathy Lakshman	4:42
4.	"Thamizhan Veera Thamizhan"	Kabilan	Rahul Nambiar	3:44
5.	"Thanjavoor Jillakkari"	Na. Muthukumar	Hemachandra, Saindhavi	5:18
6.	"Naan Nadanthal Athiradi"	Kabilan	Naveen Madhav, Janani Madhan, Shoba Chandrashekhar	4:34
Total length:				28:06

== Release ==
Sura was released on 30 April 2010.

== Reception ==
=== Critical response ===
The film received negative reviews from critics.

Pavithra Srinivasan of Rediff.com rated the film 2/5 stars and mentioned, "Give your brains a rest, and enjoy this mass masala entertainer." She also noted that Sura is a milestone film for Tamil actor Vijay, marking his 50th film and his last "mass" movie before transitioning to different script choices. The movie blends typical masala entertainment elements with Vijay's political aspirations, featuring his signature style, dance sequences, and punch dialogues, while serving as a platform for his potential future in Tamil politics. Bhama Devi Ravi of The Times of India gave the film 1.5/5 stars, commenting, "It is yet another Vijay formula film, but you would be wise to leave your logical brain behind at home." She expressed that the film lacks a compelling script and logical coherence, relying heavily on Vijay's screen presence and recycled elements from his previous films. The story revolves around Sura, a fisherman who battles a corrupt minister to protect his village, interspersed with gravity-defying action, political references, and predictable romance. Renju Joseph of News18 India reviewed and wrote, "The first half is tiresome but tolerable however the second half is a fan's sacrifice to his cult hero. The film could be recommended to only very, very hardcore fanatic fans of Vijay. Otherwise don’t even bother to get misled by the posters."

Sify gave it 3/5 stars and wrote, "On the whole, [Sura] is a roller coaster ride of pure unadulterated masala." Despite its familiar tropes and predictable narrative, the film succeeds in captivating audiences with Vijay's charismatic performance and a blend of comedy, action, and sentimentality. Ananda Vikatan gave the film a rating of 37 out of 100.

=== Box office ===
Sura grossed ₹10 crore at the TN box office, $897 thousand (₹4.13 crore (Note: Calculated using an approximate average exchange rate of 46 INR per USD in 2010)) at the Malaysian box office and €104 thousand (₹63 lakh (Note: Calculated using an approximate average exchange rate of 60.45 INR per EUR in 2010)) at the UK box office. Producer Sangili Murugan noted that the film merely recouped its budget during its theatrical run.
