= Pattaya Kelappanum Pandiya =

2014 Indian film by S. P. Rajkumar

- Poster
- Directed by: S. P. Rajkumar
- Written by: S. P. Rajkumar
- Produced by: M. Ani Muthu
- Starring: Vidharth; Manisha Yadav; Soori
- Cinematography: S. S. Murthy
- Edited by: K. Thanigachalam
- Music by: Aruldev
- Production company: Mutiara Films International
- Release date: 5 September 2014
- Country: India
- Language: Tamil

Pattaya Kelappanum Pandiya is a 2014 Tamil language romantic comedy film directed by S. P. Rajkumar and produced by M. Ani Muthu. It stars Vidharth, Manisha Yadav, and Soori in the lead roles. The music was composed by Aruldev with cinematography by S. S. Murthy and editing by K. Thanigachalam. The film was released on 5 September 2014.

== Plot ==
The plot revolves around a minibus driver named Velpandiyan and a conductor named Muthupandi and how romance evolves with Kanmani on the bus.

== Cast ==
- Vidharth as Velpandiyan
- Manisha Yadav as Kanmani
- Soori as Muthupandi
- Kovai Sarala as Velpandiyan and Muthupandi's mother
- Ilavarasu as Velpandiyan and Muthupandi's father
- Imman Annachi as Bus Owner
- Vijay Anand as Saravanan
- Mohana as Kanmani's friend
- Muthukaalai as Krish
- T. P. Gajendran as Doctor
- Lollu Sabha Manohar as Hospital Attender
- Kottachi as passenger ridiculing bus driver
- Kottai Perumal
- Bava Lakshmanan
- Jayaprakash (cameo appearance)
- Sangili Murugan (cameo appearance)

== Soundtrack ==
The music was composed by Aruldev, who earlier composed for a film called Potta Potti.

- "Yen Vizhunthai" – Swetha Mohan, Abhay Jodhpurkar
- "Urula Urulakizhangu" - Tippu
- "Sollamale" - Vijay Prakash
- "Seerivarum" - Velmurugan, Mukesh Mohamed
- "Nachu Nachu" - Ranjith, Priya Himesh

== Release ==
The satellite rights of the film were sold to Raj TV.

== Critical reception ==
The Times of India gave the film 1.5 stars out of 5 and wrote, "Pattaya Kelappanum Pandiyaa is very much a film from the 1990s. The problem is that it hews closer to the dreary ones from the decade. It is the kind of film that stops for the director to utter a punchline to a joke before displaying his name in the credit". The New Indian Express wrote, "The narration could have been crisper towards the latter part. Pattaya... may not have the best of screenplays, but it’s a fairly watchable and a clean wholesome family entertainer thanks to it’s [sic] humour quotient". Onlykollywood wrote: "Pattaiya Kelapanum Paandiya is just another Tamil film which glorifies barbaric stalking in the first half and renders an atrocious justification in the second half. The only saving grace in the film is its occasional situational comedies appearing out of nowhere".
