= Guruvamma =

2002 film by Thamarai Sendhoorapandi

- VCD cover
- Directed by: Thamarai Sendhoorpandi
- Produced by: Ernavoor A. Narayanan; A.S. Kandhan
- Starring: Livingston; Devayani
- Cinematography: Raja Rajan
- Edited by: M.P. Ravichandran
- Music by: Sagithya
- Release date: 19 July 2002
- Country: India
- Language: Tamil

Guruvamma is a 2002 Indian Tamil-language drama film directed by Thamarai Sendhoorapandi. The film stars Livingston and Devayani, with Manivannan, Senthil, Vadivukkarasi and Pasi Sathya in supporting roles. It was released on 19 July 2002, and won the Tamil Nadu State Film Award for Best Film Portraying Woman in Good Light.

== Cast ==
- Livingston as Thulasi
- Devayani as Guruvamma
- Manivannan
- Senthil
- Vadivukkarasi
- Pasi Sathya
- Balu Anand
- Idichapuli Selvaraj
- Poornitha
- Thamarai Sendhoorpandi as Guruvamma's father

== Production ==
Livingston and Devayani worked with each other four times in quick succession in the early 2000s, after appearances together in Parthasarathy's Unakkum Enakkum Kalyanam, Benjamin's Senthalam Poove and S. P. Rajkumar's En Purushan Kuzhandhai Maadhiri (2001) though the former two did not release despite having audio launches. Scriptwriter Yosi was also a part of the project. It became one of Devayani's first films that she had dubbed for in her original voice. The film was directed by Thamarai Senthoorapandi who also portrayed Devayani's father.

== Soundtrack ==
Lyrics were written by Arivumathi and composed by Sahitya.

- "Chembaruthi Poo" -
- "Iyya Ethukku" -
- "Koorai" -
- "Megame" - Hariharan
- "Odivantha Oothu" - P. Unnikrishnan
- "Thoda Thoda" - Tippu

== Critical reception ==
Malini Mannath of Chennai Online wrote, "It was meant to depict the life of pavement dwellers, and of the trials and tribulations of one woman in particular. But the way it has turned out, it is like this group of artistes are sitting by the wayside in isolation, pretending to be pavement dwellers, putting on an accent and speaking the lingo. All very put-on and laughable". The film won the Tamil Nadu State Film Award for Best Film Portraying Woman in Good Light for 2002.
