= Paakanum Pola Irukku =

2017 Indian film by S. P. Rajkumar

- Theatrical release poster
- Directed by: S. P. Rajkumar
- Written by: S. P. Rajkumar
- Produced by: Dhuvar Chandrasekhar
- Starring: Bharathan; Ansiba Hassan
- Cinematography: G. Ramesh
- Edited by: Sudha
- Music by: Aruldev
- Production company: FCS Creations
- Release date: 21 July 2017
- Country: India
- Language: Tamil

Paakanum Pola Irukku (transl. I feel like seeing you) is a 2017 Indian Tamil-language romantic comedy film written and directed by S. P. Rajkumar, starring Bharathan and Ansiba Hassan.

== Plot ==
Bharathan lives in the village with his three friends Choo Choo Maari. Keerthik, who left the village at a young age, returns to the village with her tehsildar father. While Bharathan and Keerthik's parents arrange for their marriage, Bharathan's elder brother and Keerthika's elder sister fall in love. Their parents decide to get their Bharathan and Keerthika's siblings married first before getting Bharathan and Keerthika married. Issues ensue after Bharathan's honest father misunderstands the tehsildar. How Bharathan and Keerthika reunite form the rest of the story.

== Cast ==
- Bharathan
- Ansiba Hassan
- Ganja Karuppu as Choo Choo Maari
- Soori
- 'Black' Pandi
- Jayaprakash as Bharathan's father
- Livingston as the tehsildar
- Senthi Kumari
- Dhuvar Chandrasekhar
- Vijay Anand
- Muthukaalai

== Soundtrack ==
Soundtrack was composed by Aruldev. A song from the film features jallikattu.

- Mudhal Mudhal - Bhavatharini, Sam
- Un Retta Sadai - Pavan
- Manjapoove - Saindhavi
- Vennilave - Haricharan
- Mazhayin Saaral - Vijay Narain
- Kuppamma Magale - Karthik, Hema Desai

== Release ==
The film's release in mid-2011 faced issues until the Tamil Film Producers Council later intervened and helped release the film.

== Critical reception ==
A critic from Samayam wrote that the film can be watched for its comedy. A critic from Maalai Malar called the film a laugh riot. A critic from Kalaignar TV praised the film's comedy.
