= Arivumathi =

Indian writer

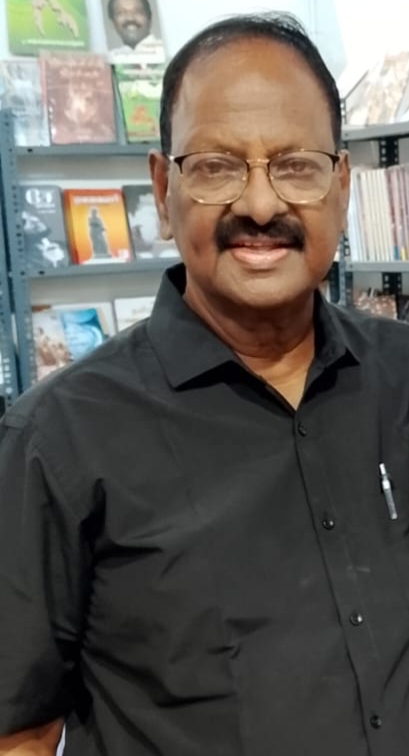
- Born: Mathiazhagan; Virudhachalam, Tamil Nadu, India
- Occupations: Poet; lyricist; writer
- Writing career
- Period: 1996–present

Arivumathi born Mathiazhagan is an Indian poet, lyricist and writer who has worked in the Tamil film industry. His first movie as lyricist was Siraichalai.

== Early life ==
Arivumathi was born in Virudhachalam, Tamil Nadu. He changed his name to Arivumathi combining his friends first name Arivazhagan as "Arivu" and his own first name "Mathi" together called as Arivumathi, he made this as paying respect to his friend who studied with him in his college. He studied Epigraphy and Archaeology in Chennai. Before turning into a lyricist he was working as assistant director to many legendary directors like Bharathiraja, Balu Mahendra and Bhagyaraj.

== Career ==
He began his career from poet Abdul Rahman from whom he learnt the art of writing Haiku poems.

He began his career in film industry as assistant director to Bhagyaraj working with him for four films. Later he joined Balu Mahendra as assistant director and worked with him for nine films. He introduced Bala a new face to Balu Mahendra to assist him and left to begin his new project as director. He was originally supposed to make his directorial debut with Ullen Ayya however the film was shelved. He joined again as assistant director to Bharathiraja and worked for films like Pudhu Nellu Pudhu Naathu and Kizhakku Cheemaiyile.Eventually he become dialogue writer and lyricist in his debut film Chiraisalai.

== Filmography ==
=== Lyricist ===
Year	Film	Song(s)
1996	Siraichalai	All Songs
1997	Dhinamum Ennai Gavani	Pathikichiyamma Pambara
1997	Ullaasam	Yaaro Yaaryaro
1997	Devathai	Deepangal Pesum & Oru Naal Antha
1997	V. I. P.	Eachangkaattula Muyalonnu
1997	Bombay Kadhali	Jeeva Natha Ennodu, Manmatha Malaranbu & Ullathil Thullidum Tamile
1997	Raman Abdullah	Muththamizhe Muththamizhe
1998	Moovendhar	Naan Vaanavillaiye Paarthen
1998	Kaadhale Nimmadhi	Kaalaiyil Pookkum
1998	Kizhakkum Merkkum	Kathum Kuyile, Poongatre & Vayasupulla
1998	Ponmanam	Pattamboochi
1998	Velai	Kunnooru Poochadi
1998	Ini Ellam Sugame	Ae Poongatru
1998	Kavalai Padathe Sagodhara	Arule Arul
1998	Iniyavale	Uyire Uyire
1998	Priyamudan	Aakasavani
1998	Poonthottam	Iniya Malargal
1998	En Uyir Nee Thaane	Symphony
1998	Desiya Geetham	Desiya Geetham
1998	Guru Paarvai	Ding Dong & Paarvai Paarvai
1998	Kannathal	Pathilenge Solvai
1998	Thalaimurai	Enna Petha Raasa
1998	Muradan	Manjalil Kulitha, Nithamum Nithamum
1999	Thodarum	Sernthu Vaazhum
1999	Chinna Raja	Anbe Anbe
1999	Endrendrum Kadhal	Nadodi Nanba
1999	Chinna Durai	Maragathakutty, Unnaipola
1999	Annan	Aalamarathu Kuyile, Vayasu Pulla Vayasu Pulla
1999	Periyanna	Pacholay Keethukulla
1999	Rajasthan	Sorgathil Nikah
1999	Malabar Police	En Kannadi Thoppukkulle, En Kannadi Pesavillai
1999	Anbulla Kadhalukku	Manmatha Malaiye
1999	Pudhu Kudithanam	Adi Sammatham
1999	Sethu	Enge Sellum Intha, Vaarthai Thavari Vittai & Maalai En Vethanai
1999	Manam Virumbuthe Unnai	Ilavenirkala Panjami
2000	Kuberan	Vaanam Vazhtha
2000	Ilaiyavan	En Idhayam
2000	Thenali	Athini Sithini
2001	Dhill	Kannukulle and Oh Nanbane
2001	Veettoda Mappillai	Mannukketha Machane, Mapillaiyae
2001	Piriyadha Varam Vendum	Privondrai Santhithen
2001	Alli Thandha Vaanam	Kannale Miya Miya, Thom Thom, Anthi Karukkayile, Thattan Kedakkalaiyoo, Vaadi Vaadi Nattukkattai
2001	Mr. Narathar	Ullam Kavarum
2001	Naan Paada Ninaipathellam	Aathalinaal & Muthu Muthu
2002	Alli Arjuna	Onne Onne
2002	Kamarasu	Chinna Chinna Vilakke
2002	Karmegham	Etumula Veti Kati
2002	Run	Poi Solla Koodathu
2002	Namma Veetu Kalyanam	Ennadi Gnana Penn
2002	Bala	Theendi Theendi
2003	Dhool	Madurai Veeran & Kundu Kundu
2003	Anbu	Oththa Solluthan
2003	Thendral	Pathrakotta Mama
2003	Punnagai Poove	Eno Uyirmele & Siragaagi Ponathae
2003	Well Done	Kitchu Kitchu
2003	Parthiban Kanavu	Vaadi Machhiniyae
2003	Ice	Vaaname Enakke
2003	Aahaa Ethanai Azhagu	Kaadu Pathikichi
2003	Alaudin	Goyyaka
2003	Boys	Boom Boom
2003	Alai	Paiya Paiya
2003	Thirumalai	Azhagooril Poothvale
2004	Varnajalam	Pinju Mazhai Charal
2004	Udhaya	Udhaya Udhaya
2004	Sullan	Siragu Mulaitha
2004	Chatrapathy	Kaadhal Theviravathi
2004	Amma Appa Chellam	Pattam Poochi
2005	Ji	Kiliye Kiliye
2010	Mandhira Punnagai	Satta Sada Sada, Enna Kuraiyo, Megam Vandhu Pogum & Siththan Mugam Ondru
2010	Magizhchi	Utchukotta Itchu Vachhu
2011	Siruthai	Thalattu
2011	Uyarthiru 420	Azhagiya Ravana
2011	Mudhal Idam	Inge Vaanthey, Mudhal Idam, Thindaduren Naane, Uyya Uyya
2011	Vengayam	Ara Kirukkan, Megame Ven Megame
2011	Sadhurangam	Vizhiyum
2012	Soozhnilai	Kanne Nee Solladi, Vanthu Pogirai
2012	Ragalai	Unnai Paadam, Vada Vada Vellai Poove
2012	Ramcharan	Sydney Nagaram, Rooba Rooba
2013	Vathikuchi	Kanna Kanna
2013	Naiyaandi	Ae Le Le Etti Paarthale
2013	Ameerin Aadhi-Bhagavan	Kaatriley Nadanthene
2013	Annakodi	Pothi Vecha
2014	Arima Nambi	Neeye Neeye
2017	Kalavaadiya Pozhuthugal	Azhagazhage
2018	Sandakozhi 2	Sengarattan Paaraiyula
2020	Walter	Mooche Analena Aache
2024	Anjaamai	Neeye Neeye
2026	Tamizh Murugan	Vetri Tamil Murugan

Television

- 2003 Salanam
- 2003 Roja

=== Dialogue writer ===
- Siraichaalai (1996)

== Other works ==
=== Books ===
- Mazhai Pechu
- Natpu Kalam
- Muthirai Kavithaigal
- Vali (Kavidhai Thoguppu)
- Thamizh Murugan
- Ayulin Anthivarai

== Awards ==
- 1999: Tamil Nadu State Film Award for Best Lyricist - Kizhakkum Merkkum
- 2011: Ananda Vikatan Cinema Awards for Best Lyricist - Sadhurangam
