= C. R. Saraswathi =

Indian actress and politician

- ச

Personal details
- Born: Chennai, Tamilnadu, India
- Party: AIADMK (1999 - 2017), Amma Makkal Munnetra Kazhagam (from 2018)
- Occupation: Actress; Politician

C. R. Saraswathi is an Indian actress and politician who has predominantly appeared in Tamil films. She is currently acting as spokesperson of Amma Makkal Munnetra Kazhagam, which started off as a breakaway faction of the All India Anna Dravida Munnetra Kazhagam.

== Career ==
C. R. Saraswathi started her career as a film actress in 1979 and joined All India Anna Dravida Munnetra Kazhagam in 1999. In 2014, she was appointed spokesperson for the AIADMK party by Jayalalithaa. She contested and lost in 2016 Tamil Nadu Assembly election at Pallavaram constituent assembly. She is currently in Amma Makkal Munnetra Kazhagam.

== Election contested ==
Election	Constituency	Party	Result	Vote %	Winner	Winner Party	Winner vote %
2016 Tamil Nadu Legislative Assembly election	Pallavaram	ADMK	Lost	39.19%	I. Karunanithi	DMK	44.94%

== Filmography ==
Year	Film	Role	Notes
1979	Suvarilladha Chiththirangal	Selvi	
1981	Sreeraman Sreemathi	Ravi's wife	Malayalam film
1985	Njan Piranna Nattil		Malayalam film
1987	Enga Chinna Rasa	Nagamani	
1988	Annanagar Mudhal Theru	Saraswathi	
1988	Rayilukku Neramachu		
1989	En Rathathin Rathame		
1989	Ellame En Thangachi		
1991	Pudhiya Raagam	Raghuraman's mother	
1991	Mugguru Attala Muddula Alludu		Telugu film
1991	Manasara Vazhthungalen		
1991	Kulamma Gunamma		Telugu film
1991	Vasanthakala Paravai	Lawyer	
1992	Pondatti Rajyam		
1992	Thanga Manasukkaran	Yasodai	
1992	Abhirami	Saroja	
1992	Ilavarasan	Selvanayagam's wife	
1992	Sevagan	Ashok's mother	
1992	Singaravelan	Sumathi's mother	Cameo
1992	Amma Vanthachu	School teacher	
1992	Kaviya Thalaivan	Priya's friend	
1992	Naalaya Seidhi	Savithri	
1993	Prathap		
1993	Manikuyil	Rathnasabapathy's wife	
1993	Enga Muthalali	Vani Nair	
1993	Porantha Veeda Puguntha Veeda		
1993	Maamiyar Veedu		
1994	Amaidhi Padai	Kuyili's mother	
1994	Atha Maga Rathiname	Pudukkottai Sundari	
1994	Killadi Mappillai	Devi's mother	
1994	Subramaniya Swamy	Sarasa	
1995	Engirundho Vandhan	Meenakshi	
1995	Paattu Padava	Devi's mother	
1995	Karnaa	Manickam's wife	
1995	Oru Oorla Oru Rajakumari		
1995	Gandhi Pirantha Mann	Sathyavathi	
1996	Vasantha Vaasal	Vasantha	
1996	Purushan Pondatti	Suryakala	
1996	Selva	Bhama	
1996	Indraprastham	Dance teacher	Malayalam film
1997	Pudhu Nilavu		
1997	Once More	Lakshmi	
1997	Porkkaalam		
1998	Naam Iruvar Namakku Iruvar		
1998	En Uyir Nee Thaane	Janaki's sister-in-law	
1998	Ninaithen Vandhai	Savitri's Aunt	
1998	Sivappu Nila	Lawyer	
1999	Chinna Durai		
1999	Guest House		
1999	Anbulla Kadhalukku	Priya's mother	
1999	Maravathe Kanmaniye		
1999	Minsara Kanna	Indra Devi's factory worker	
2000	Unnai Kann Theduthey		
2001	En Purushan Kuzhandhai Maadhiri	Maheswari's grandmother	
2002	Pammal K. Sambandam	Malathi's Mother	
2002	Kamarasu	Vasanthi's mother	
2002	Karmegham		
2002	Ivan		
2006	47A Besant Nagar Varai		
2007	Nam Naadu	Political member	
2008	Pazhani	Deepti's mother	
