= Mudakkaruthaan =

- Directed by: Dr.K.Veera Babu
- Written by: Dr.K.Veera Babu
- Starring: Dr.K.Veera Babu; Mahana
- Cinematography: Arul Selvan
- Edited by: Aakash
- Music by: Sirpy
- Production company: Vayal Movies
- Release date: 25 January 2024
- Country: India
- Language: Tamil

Mudakkaruthaan (transl. Disabled) is 2024 Indian Tamil-language action film written and directed by Dr.K.Veera Babu. The film stars Dr.K.Veerababu and Mahan. The film was produced under the banner of Vayal Movies.

== Cast ==
- Dr.K.Veerababu
- Mahana
- Super Subbarayan
- Mayilsamy
- Bava Lakshmanan
- Muthukaalai
- Vaishnavi
- Baby Shalini Ramesh
- Dhayalan Ramesh
- Indrajith
- P. Samuthirakani

== Reception ==
Maalai Malar critic rated 2 out of 5 and wrote that "Siddha doctor Veerababu, who is playing the hero of the story, has done great social service by saving many patients affected by the corona virus through Siddha medicine, a Tamil medical system."

Virakesari critic rated 2 out of 5 and noted that "He shines if he gets a chance. The actor who plays the role of Gauri in the second half has wasted so much opportunity to act."
