= En Uyir Neethaane =

- Poster
- Directed by: S. P. Rajkumar
- Story by: Bhoopathi Raja
- Based on: Pellichesukundam (Telugu)
- Produced by: Annur N. Senthil; Tiruppur S. Selvaraj
- Starring: Prabhu; Devayani
- Cinematography: Ramesh Gandhi
- Edited by: K. Thanikachalam
- Music by: Deva
- Production company: Jeeva Jyothi Films
- Release date: 19 October 1998
- Running time: 150 minutes
- Country: India
- Language: Tamil

En Uyir Neethaane (transl. You are My Life) is a 1998 Indian Tamil-language romantic drama film, directed by S. P. Rajkumar. The film stars Prabhu and Devayani. It is a remake of the Telugu film Pelli Chesukundam. The film was released on 19 October 1998, during Diwali and became a decent hit.

== Plot ==
Vasu is a rich industrialist who raises his father's illegitimate son after the death of his mother. His father opposes this. Vasu leaves home to live alone with the child. Janaki witnesses a murder and testifies against the murderer. He is convicted. The murderer's brother rapes Janaki in revenge, and Janaki is kicked out of her house by her brother. She goes to her friend's house, but even there, she is kicked out. Vasu comes to her rescue. Janaki becomes a mother for Vasu's illegitimate brother and manager in Vasu's mill. Vasu is drawn towards her and wants to marry her. She turns him down, believing he is doing so out of sympathy. Vasu's mother tells Janaki to say no to Vasu's proposal for marriage as her aunt's daughter, Seema is coming from the US, and she wants Vasu to marry her instead. Janaki agrees and asks Prabhu to marry Seema instead. Janaki's rapist tries to marry her to make her withdraw the case, and then kill her. Vasu saves her. Finally, Seema realises Vasu's love for Janaki and refuses to marry him. Vasu and Janaki are united.

== Cast ==
- Prabhu as Vasu
- Devayani as Janaki
- Goundamani as Bullet Jackie
- Senthil as Nicolas
- Maheswari as Seema
- Rajan P. Dev as Rajasekhar
- Srividya as Vasu's mother
- Rajesh as Janaki's brother
- C. R. Saraswathi as Janaki's brother wife
- Thyagu as Police Inspector
- Mahendran as Rajasekhar's son
- Muthukaalai as mechanic
- LIC Narasimhan as Police Commissioner
- Ambika as guest appearance

== Production ==
After the success of Ponmanam, S. P. Rajkumar collaborated again with Prabhu for second time. The film marked the first collaboration of Prabhu and Devayani. The film marked the debut of G. Ramesh as cinematographer. A real polo match featured in the film's title credits was shot at Madras Polo & Riders Club.

== Soundtrack ==
The soundtrack was composed by Deva.

Song	Singers	Lyrics	Length
"January Nilave"	Krishnaraj, Sujatha	S. P. Rajkumar	05:31
"Mela Mela"	Mano, K. S. Chithra	Palani Bharathi	05:16
"Nicobar"	Mano, Deva	Kamakodiyan	05:15
"Padhinettu Vayasu"	Sujatha, S. P. Balasubrahmanyam	Palani Bharathi	05:03
"Symphony"	P. Unnikrishnan, Harini	Arivumathi	05:01

== Reception ==
Thamarai Manalan of Dinakaran wrote "there is full scope for Prabu and Devayani in this film to exhibit their exceptional acting talent", and that "both of them have performed remarkably well". The critic added that "after very long days, Prabu has achieved very great feat in acting, by completely melting down where the situation demands it and has emotionally burst out also where he would naturally be expected to do so". D. S. Ramanujam, for The Hindu, appreciated Rajkumar's direction and the cast performances, but felt "Goundamani-Senthil and another newcomer really get on one's nerves with their comedy".
