= Mayilsamy =

Indian actor and comedian (1965–2023)

- Born: 2 October 1965; Sathyamangalam, Erode, Tamil Nadu, India
- Died: 19 February 2023 (aged 57); Chennai, Tamil Nadu, India
- Occupations: Actor; comedian; TV host
- Years active: 1984–2023
- Spouse: Shantha
- Children: 2, including Yuvan
- Relatives: K. Pitchandi (co-father-in-law)

Mayilsamy (2 October 1965 – 19 February 2023) was an Indian actor and comedian who primarily played supporting roles. Appearing in many Tamil films, he was also a regular guest judge for Asathapovathu Yaaru on Sun TV in Chennai. He was well known for his comedy tracks in movies collaborating with veteran comedians Vivek and Vadivelu. He featured in excess of 200 films in a career spanning nearly four decades.

He was renowned for his mimicry skills and soon became a household name in Tamil Nadu through the television hit show Comedy Time. He was also actively involved in debates and was highly regarded for his speech skills, and won the Tamil Nadu State Film Award for Best Comedian for his performance in Kangalal Kaidhu Sei.

== Career ==
Mayilsamy was involved in various stage performances and in theatres from his early childhood days. He performed and travelled across Tamil Nadu with a local famous comedy troupe.

He began his film career in the 1980s. His acting debut was in Dhavani Kanavugal (1984), which he shared billing with K. Bhagyaraj. He played minor roles in several films in his early career, including Apoorva Sagodharargal (1989) and Michael Madhana Kama Rajan (1990), in which he collaborated with veteran actor Kamal Haasan. He rose to prominence for his performance in Dhool (2003) with Vivek.

Mayilsamy also had a series of standup comedy releases, including Sirippo Sirippu. He made his debut on Tamil television as the host and judge of the popular comedy show Asathapovathu Yaaru, which aired on Sun TV from 2002 to 2004 and attained a very high place among the comedy reality shows. Mayilsamy mainly appeared as a host and occasionally as a guest judge.

== Personal life ==
In October 2009, Mayilsamy announced that his son Arumainayagam was ready to act in films, and gave him the stage name of Anbu. Later his other son Yuvan also started acting in TV shows.

== Death ==
Mayilsamy died from a cardiac arrest in Chennai, in the early morning on 19 February 2023, at the age of 57.

On the evening of 18 February, Mayilsamy had attended a Shivratri Puja at Sri Meghnad Eswarar temple in Kelambakkam, Chennai. He then called Drums Sivamani to conduct a special musical session in the temple, which occurred at around 11 PM. He was returning home from the temple in the early morning, when he suffered a cardiac arrest. He was taken to a nearby hospital in an auto-rickshaw. The doctors declared him brought dead.

His funeral was conducted at his home. He was cremated at AVM cemetery in Vadapalani on 20 February.

== Filmography ==
=== Films ===
Year	Film	Role	Notes
1984	Dhavani Kanavugal	Crowd member	
1985	Kanni Rasi	Retailer's delivery boy	
1988	En Thangachi Padichava	Constable	
1989	Apoorva Sagodharargal	Kamal's friend	
1989	Vetri Vizha	Mayilsamy	Guest appearance
1990	Panakkaran	Factory worker	
1990	Michael Madana Kama Rajan	Raju's colleague	
1991	Anbulla Thangachikku	Student	
1991	Rasathi Varum Naal	Pazhani	
1992	Chinna Gounder		
1992	Senthamizh Paattu	Konavayen	
1992	Meera		
1993	Uzhaippali	Tamilarasan's friend	
1993	Udan Pirappu		
1993	Walter Vetrivel		
1994	Duet	Mayilsamy	
1995	Villadhi Villain		
1995	Manathile Oru Paattu	Mayilu	
1996	Avathara Purushan		
1996	Sundara Purushan		
1996	Gnanapazham	Bar owner	
1996	Take It Easy Urvashi		
1997	Sakthi		
1997	Vaimaye Vellum	Mayilsamy	
1997	Nerrukku Ner	Petty shop owner	
1997	Periya Manushan		
1998	Ponmanam		
1998	Rathna		
1998	Kalyana Galatta		
1999	House Full	Indigenous man	
1999	Ninaivirukkum Varai		
1999	Anantha Poongathe	Mani	
1999	Mugam		
2000	Eazhaiyin Sirippil	Bus customer	
2000	Annai		
2000	Thai Poranthachu	'Netrikkann' Netkundram	
2000	James Pandu		
2000	Kannan Varuvaan		
2000	Pennin Manathai Thottu	Pickpocket	
2000	Unnai Kann Theduthey		
2000	Kannukku Kannaga		
2000	Palayathu Amman		
2000	Seenu	Troupe song leader	
2000	Thenali	Police officer	
2001	Looty	Mayilu	
2001	Nageswari		
2001	Ullam Kollai Poguthae	Anbu's friend	
2001	Rishi	Left	
2001	En Purushan Kuzhandhai Maadhiri	Dr. Kuyilsaamy	
2001	Little John	Kabali	Trilingual film
2001	Dhill	Kanagavel's friend	
2001	Kanden Seethaiyai	Guduvanchery Govindasamy	
2001	Viswanathan Ramamoorthy	Sukumar	
2001	Vedham		
2001	12B	Citizen	
2001	Aalavandhan	Theatregoer	Bilingual film
2001	Thavasi	Fraud	
2001	Poovellam Un Vasam	a guest at Anitha's wedding	
2001	Paarthale Paravasam		
2001	Vinnukum Mannukum	Associate director	
2001	Aandan Adimai		
2002	Vivaramana Aalu	Mariappan	
2002	Unnai Ninaithu	Vaidyalingam's patient	
2002	April Maadhathil		
2002	Varushamellam Vasantham	Tea shop owner	
2002	Yai! Nee Romba Azhaga Irukey!	Housewarming guest	Uncredited role
2002	Thenkasi Pattanam	Raja	
2002	Raja	Drunk passenger	
2002	Ninaikkatha Naalillai	Mayilsamy	
2002	Karmegham		
2002	Maaran		
2003	Dhool	Kochako	
2003	Vaseegara	Moorthy	
2003	Pallavan	'Biodata' Paramasivan	
2003	Military		
2003	Lesa Lesa	Fraud	
2003	Jayam		
2003	Whistle	Sahadevan's friend	
2003	Kadhal Kisu Kisu	Mayilsamy	
2004	Kangalal Kaidhu Sei	Barber	Tamil Nadu State Film Award for Best Comedian
2004	Ghilli	Lighthouse watchman Narayanan	
2004	Sound Party		
2004	Giri		
2005	Devathayai Kanden	Mayil	
2005	Ayodhya	Guna	
2005	Kannadi Pookal	Jail child caretaker	
2005	London	Natrajan Krishna Moorthi alias Nattu Kicchu	
2005	Sachein	Fake blind man	
2005	February 14	Himself	
2005	Ponniyin Selvan	Garbage company worker	
2005	Chanakya	Subramani's customer	
2006	Unarchigal	Kalyanaraman	
2006	Paramasivan	Police inspector	
2006	Thalai Nagaram	Naai Sekar's assistant	
2006	Rendu	Thief	
2006	Thimiru	Drunkard	Cameo appearance
2006	Nenjil Jil Jil	Vellam's assistant	
2006	Thiruvilaiyaadal Aarambam	Tidelpark Venugopal	
2007	Naan Avanillai	Alex Thambidurai/Napolean	
2007	Ninaithu Ninaithu Parthen		
2007	Sivaji: The Boss	Himself	Guest appearance
2007	Maa Madurai		
2007	Thottal Poo Malarum	Auto driver	
2007	Anbu Thozhi		
2007	Malaikottai	Idimutti Kannan	
2007	Kannamoochi Yenada		Cameo appearance
2007	Machakaaran	Police constable	
2008	Thotta		
2008	Vaitheeswaran		
2008	Vedha		
2008	Nepali	Priya's relative	
2008	Pandi	Mokkaisaamy	
2008	Kuselan		
2008	Jayamkondaan	Advocate	
2008	Dhanam		
2008	Keka	Shopkeeper	Telugu film
2008	Dindigul Sarathy	Sarathy's uncle	
2008	Silambattam	Priest	
2008	Panchamirtham	Rajaram's relative	
2008	Suryaa		
2009	Padikathavan	Mayilsamy	
2009	Guru En Aalu	Director	
2009	Aarupadai	Thief	
2009	Rajadhi Raja		
2009	Thoranai	Watchman	
2009	Mayandi Kudumbathar	Mayandi and Virumandi's younger cousin	
2009	Ragavan		
2009	Ayyavazhi		
2009	Sirithal Rasipen	Rama	
2009	Engal Aasan		
2009	Modhi Vilayadu	T. M. Sekhar	
2009	Malai Malai	Sketch artist	
2009	Malayan		
2009	Sindhanai Sei		
2009	Kanthaswamy		
2009	Aarumugam	O. C. Idly customer	
2009	Kanden Kadhalai		Cameo appearance
2009	Naan Avanillai 2	Annamalai's assistant	
2010	Kutty	Paramasivam	Cameo appearance
2010	Rasikkum Seemane		
2010	Theeradha Vilaiyattu Pillai	Shekar	
2010	Azhagaana Ponnuthan		
2010	Ambasamudram Ambani	Cellphone person	
2010	Pournami Nagam		
2010	Goripalayam	Retired rowdy	
2010	Thottupaar		
2010	Maruthani		
2010	Thillalangadi	Rowdy	
2010	Uthamaputhiran	Santhoshkanth	
2010	Maruthani		
2011	Siruthai	Toilet patron (IT office)	
2011	Aadu Puli	Thillainayagam's assistant	
2011	Eththan		
2011	Sabash Sariyana Potti	Mani	
2011	Kanchana	Fake priest	
2011	Kasethan Kadavulada	Thangaraj	
2011	Maithanam		
2011	Mudhal Idam		
2011	Puli Vesham		
2011	Potta Potti	Harichandra	
2011	Vellore Maavattam		
2011	Osthe	Saravanan	
2011	Rajapattai		
2011	Yuvan Yuvathi	Auto driver	
2011	Sadhurangam	Peon	
2012	Maasi	Thief	
2012	Adhi Narayana		
2012	Vilayada Vaa	Johnny	
2012	Ariyaan		
2012	Aathi Narayana		
2012	Nellai Santhippu	Textile shop owner	
2012	Kozhi Koovuthu		
2012	Akilan		
2013	Naan Rajavaga Pogiren		
2013	Pattathu Yaanai	Jackpot	
2013	Sathiram Perundhu Nilayam		
2013	Ragalaipuram		
2013	Thagaraaru		
2014	Veeram	Marikozhundhu	
2014	Kalavaram		
2014	Inga Enna Solluthu		Cameo appearance
2014	Idhu Kathirvelan Kadhal	Mimicry artist	Cameo appearance
2014	Naan Than Bala		
2014	Yaamirukka Bayamey	Adaikalam "Brother"	
2014	Aindhaam Thalaimurai Sidha Vaidhiya Sigamani	Bhai	
2014	Velmurugan Borewells		
2014	Irumbu Kuthirai	Jeevan Ramesh	
2014	Naan Sigappu Manithan	Passerby	
2014	Poriyaalan	Uncle	
2014	Theriyama Unna Kadhalichitten		
2014	Kalkandu		
2014	Jaihind 2	Kulfi Gopalan	Uncredited role
2014	Naaigal Jaakirathai	Dog owner	
2014	Thirumanam Enum Nikkah		
2014	Vingyani		
2014	Pagadai Pagadai	Kalyan	
2015	Kaaki Sattai	Sankara Narayanan / Cyber Sanki / Sankiji Swamy	
2015	Vajram	Annamalai	
2015	Kanchana 2	Watchman	
2015	Vai Raja Vai		
2015	Pokkiri Mannan	Marudhu's father	
2015	Strawberry	Swamiji	
2015	Vedalam	House owner	
2015	Uppu Karuvaadu	Pandiya	
2015	Thiruttu Rail		
2016	Pokkiri Raja		
2016	Mapla Singam		
2016	Adida Melam		
2016	Narathan	Narathan's assistant	
2016	Jithan 2	Venugopal	
2016	Kanden Kadhal Konden		
2016	Manithan	Constable Guruji	
2016	Ko 2	Yogeeswaran's party volunteer	
2016	Pandiyoda Galatta Thaangala	Pandi	
2016	Paisa		
2016	Ka Ka Ka Po		
2016	Ennama Katha Vudranunga		
2016	Remo	Security guard	
2016	Kavalai Vendam	Dr. Bhaskar	
2016	Virumandikkum Sivanandikkum		
2016	Dhilluku Dhuddu	Waiter	
2017	Kanavu Variyam	Mahout	
2017	Yaakkai	Barfly	
2017	Motta Shiva Ketta Shiva		
2017	Sangili Bungili Kadhava Thorae	Tea shop owner	
2017	Bongu	Mayil	
2017	Ivan Thanthiran	Theatre owner	
2017	Gemini Ganeshanum Suruli Raajanum	Priya's father	
2017	Podhuvaga Emmanasu Thangam	Narayanan	
2017	Aayirathil Iruvar		
2017	Hara Hara Mahadevaki	Resident	
2017	Sakka Podu Podu Raja	Vastu	
2018	Kaathiruppor Pattiyal	Kodeeswaran	
2018	Enna Thavam Seitheno		
2018	Kasu Mela Kasu	Periyasamy	
2018	Aaruthra		
2018	Annanukku Jai	Murugesan	
2018	2.0	Personal assistant of Vaira Moorthy	
2018	Kaatrin Mozhi	Perumal, department store owner	
2018	Sandakozhi 2	Drunkard	
2019	Sigai	Subramani	Released on ZEE5
2019	LKG	LKG's uncle	
2019	Boomerang		
2019	Nenjamundu Nermaiyundu Odu Raja	House owner	
2019	Kalavani 2	Chinnasaamy (Thosai)	
2019	Gurkha	Politician	
2019	Kaappaan	Delhi police inspector Abhishek Nagar	
2019	Aruvam	School watchman	
2019	Butler Balu	Kalyanam	
2019	Dhanusu Raasi Neyargale	Chinnakaalai	Cameo appearance
2019	Thirupathi Samy Kudumbam	Bhai	
2019	50/50	Nagaraj	
2020	Sandimuni		
2020	Mookuthi Amman	Deaf priest	Guest appearance
2021	Malaysia to Amnesia	Watchman	
2021	Devadas Brothers		
2021	Sabhaapathy	Astrologer	
2021	Murungakkai Chips	Kuyilsamy	
2022	Anbulla Ghilli		
2022	Idiot	Aandavar	
2022	Nenjuku Needhi	V. Villalan	
2022	Veetla Vishesham	Unni's neighbor	
2022	The Legend	Thangam's sidekick	
2022	Udanpaal		
2023	Ghosty	Security	Posthumous release
2023	Tamil Kudimagan		Posthumous release
2023	80s Buildup	Kaali	Posthumous release
2023	Kannagi	Kalai's father	Posthumous release
2023	Saba Nayagan	Police Constable M. Suseendiran	Posthumous release
2024	Mudakkaruthaan		Posthumous release
2024	Glassmates		Posthumous release
2024	Garudan	Photo appearance only	Posthumous release
2024	Yaavarum Vallavare		Posthumous release
2025	Kuzhanthaigal Munnetra Kazhagam		Posthumous release

=== Television ===
Year	Title	Role	Channel
1996	Marmadesam (Ragasiyam)	Santhanakrishnan	Sun TV
2003	Comedy Time	Host	Sun TV
2005	Timekku comedy	Host	Jaya TV
2019	Lollupa	Host	Sun TV

=== Voice artist ===
- 1992 - Kasthuri Manjal
- 1996 - Selva for Manivannan
- 2001 - Ullam Kollai Poguthae
- 2004 - New for Brahmanandam, Ali
- 2004 - Ghilli for Brahmanandam
