= Karmegham =

- Poster
- Directed by: S. P. Rajkumar
- Written by: S. P. Rajkumar
- Produced by: S. Rajammal; S. Subathradevi; S. Subramaniyam
- Starring: Mammootty; Radha Ravi; Abhirami
- Cinematography: Rm. Ramanathshetty
- Edited by: K. Thanigachalam
- Music by: Vidyasagar
- Production company: S. S. R. Movies
- Release date: 2 August 2002
- Running time: 140 minutes
- Country: India
- Language: Tamil

Karmegham (transl. Black Cloud) is a 2002 Indian Tamil language action drama film directed by S. P. Rajkumar. The film stars Mammootty, Radha Ravi, and Abhirami.

== Plot ==
Karmegham returns to his village after serving in the army for long. He finds that the villagers still live in the shackles of old customs and traditions. They work as slavs to them. Maheswari, a doctor, falls in love with Karmegham. Later through his mother, Karmegham learns that Radha Ravi is his father and then it becomes a father-son conflict. Karmegham stood with the villagers and opposed his father and brother Shakthi. His sister, Mangai, loves a poor villager but Sakthi and his father are against her love. Sakthi kills his sister's lover, his sister goes mad and Karmegham calls the police. His brother escapes but the police shot him in an encounter. Karmegham gets married with Maheswari. Karmegham kills his father to save at least his villageres to a feudal landlord who exploiting them.

== Cast ==
- Mammootty as Karmegham
- Abhirami as Maheswari
- Vadivelu as Khanja
- Radha Ravi as Karmegham's father
- Manorama as Karmegham's mother
- Baburaj as Police Officer
- Ilavarasu as Saguni
- Thalaivasal Vijay as a District Collector
- Vinu Chakravarthy
- C. R. Saraswathi
- Mayilsamy as Mayil
- Singamuthu
- Halwa Vasu
- Bonda Mani
- Muthukaalai
- Alphonsa in a special appearance

== Production ==
The film was shot at Gobichettipalayam.

== Soundtrack ==
The soundtrack was composed by Vidyasagar.

| Song | Singer(s) | Lyrics | Duration |
|---|---|---|---|
| "Etumula Veti Kati" | Unni Menon, Antara Chowdhury | Arivumathi | 4:44 |
| "Kaasa Padi Alantha" | Vidyasagar | Yugabharathi | 3:48 |
| "Satham Podum" | Shankar Mahadevan, Sri Vardhini | Palani Bharathi | 4:18 |
| "Sri Ranga Pattanam" (duet) | Malathy Lakshman, Gopal Sharma | Pa. Vijay | 4:41 |
| "Sri Ranga Pattanam" (solo) | Malathi Lakshman | Pa. Vijay | 4:41 |
| "Thaaratha Pati" | Manikka Vinayagam, Swarnalatha | Palani Bharathi | 4:37 |

== Reception ==
Sify described the film as an "Old wine in new bottle" and wrote, "It is an old style tearjerker that lacks any freshness either by way of incidents or narration". Malini Mannath of Chennai Online wrote that "there is not much freshness here, the style reminding one of films of a couple of decades back. In fact, take away Vadivelu, and there is not much to boast about in the film".
