= Azhagar Malai =

- Directed by: S. P. Rajkumar
- Written by: S. P. Rajkumar
- Produced by: Karumari Kanthaswamy (Presenter); K. lakshmana Murthy
- Starring: RK; Muktha; Napoleon; Lal; Vadivelu
- Cinematography: A. Karthik Raja
- Edited by: J. N. Harsha
- Music by: Ilaiyaraaja
- Production company: Karumari Movies
- Distributed by: Karumari Movies
- Release date: 7 August 2009
- Country: India
- Language: Tamil

Azhagar Malai (transl. Azhagar Mountain) is a 2009 Tamil language masala film written and directed by S. P. Rajkumar. It stars RK and Muktha, while Napoleon, Lal, and Vadivelu play supporting roles. The music was composed by Ilaiyaraaja with cinematography by A. Karthik Raja and editing by J. N. Harsha. The film released on 7 August 2009.

== Plot ==
The film is set in a village near Madurai. Pugazhendi (RK) spends all his time drinking and is ridiculed by everyone. In contrast, his elder brother Pandithurai (Napoleon) is respected and admired by everyone. Pandithurai showers love and affection on Pugazh. He even tries to arrange for his wedding upon hoping he would reform. However, knowing about Pugazh and his habits, nobody comes forward to give their daughter to him. Pugazh, who spends all his time with his maternal uncle Kaththamuthu (Vadivelu), comes across Janani (Muktha). It is love at first sight for him. Meanwhile, the family of Rathnavelu (Lal), another powerful man in the village, is hellbent on revenging Pandithurai and his family due to some previous enmity. They hatch a conspiracy and try to halt Pughazh and Janani's wedding. The film cuts to a flashback, and the reason for the ill-feeling between two families is revealed. It is now up to Pugazh to bump off Rathnavelu and restore peace in his family.

== Cast ==
- RK as Pugazhendhi
- Muktha as Janani
- Napoleon as Pandithurai
- Lal as Rathnavelu
- Vadivelu as Kaththamuthu
- Manivannan
- Thyagu
- Sona Heiden as Rose
- Bonda Mani
- Anu Mohan
- Muthukaalai
- Besant Ravi
- King Kong
- Halwa Vasu
- Singamuthu
- Ranjitha as Malar (guest appearance)
- Saravanan in a guest appearance
- Suganya in a guest appearance

== Soundtrack ==
Soundtrack was composed by Ilaiyaraaja.

Track listing
No.	Title	Lyrics	Singer(s)	Length
1.	"Kizhakku Velukkuthu"	Mu. Metha	Madhu Balakrishnan, Bela Shende	5:07
2.	"Karugamani"	Na. Muthukumar	Ilaiyaraaja, Bela Shende	5:07
3.	"Ulagam Ippo"	Vaali	Ilaiyaraaja	4:55
4.	"Muthamma Muthamma"	Snehan	Madhu Balakrishnan, Rita	4:29
5.	"Enna Senjalum"	Muthulingam	Tippu, Poni	5:21
6.	"Unnai Enakku"	Palani Bharathi	Bhavatharini, Rita	5:03
Total length:				30:02

== Critical reception ==
Sify wrote, "Azhagar Malai has nothing new to offer and has a silly excuse for a plot, with some of the poorest actors you could possibly assemble, aimed at B and C centre audiences." Rediff wrote, "The real problem is the screenplay though the comedy, and some slick production values are the only things that keeps it going while all the twists and turns are as predictable as a 70s pot-boiler." Webdunia wrote "Comedy is the pillar of Azhagar Malai, everything else is futile."
