= Local Sarakku =

- Theatrical release poster
- Directed by: S. P. Rajkumar
- Written by: S. P. Rajkumar
- Produced by: K. Vinothkumar
- Starring: Dinesh; Yogi Babu; Upasana RC
- Cinematography: Ks Palani
- Edited by: Jf Castro
- Music by: Vr Suwaminathan Rajesh
- Production company: Varaha Swamy Films
- Distributed by: Shaalini Cine Creation
- Release date: 26 January 2024
- Country: India
- Language: Tamil

Local Sarakku (transl. Local alcohol) is a 2024 Tamil-language comedy film directed by S. P. Rajkumar and produced by K. Vinothkumar under the banner of Varaha Swamy Films. The film stars Dinesh, Yogi Babu and Upasana RC in the lead roles.

== Cast ==
- Dinesh as Saravanan
- Yogi Babu as Saravanan's friend
- Upasana RC as Mageswari
- Imman Annachi as Saravanan's uncle
- Vinodhini Vaidyanathan as Vinodha
- Singampuli as agent Thangaraj
- Chaams as Film actor
- Vaiyapuri as Film director
- Sendrayan as Saravanan's brother-in-law

== Production ==
The first poster of the film was released in July 2023 and the trailer was released in August 2023.

== Reception ==
Raisa Nasreen of Times Now rated the film three out of five and stated that "The Tamil film is also said to tell the message of how women should lead a brave and courageous life.
