= Kamarasu =

- DVD cover
- Directed by: P. C. Anbazhagan
- Written by: P. C. Anbazhagan
- Produced by: P. S. K. Karunakaran (Presenter); P. Shenbagarajan; P. K. Karuna; N. Vanaraja; P. Sampath
- Starring: Murali; Laila
- Cinematography: Selva. R
- Edited by: V. Jai Shankar
- Music by: S. A. Rajkumar
- Production company: Shanthi Vanaraja Movies
- Distributed by: Super Good Films
- Release date: 22 February 2002
- Running time: 135 minutes
- Country: India
- Language: Tamil

Kamarasu (/kɑː.mərɑːsu/) is a 2002 Indian Tamil-language romantic drama film written and directed by P. C. Anbazhagan. It stars Murali and Laila, with Vadivelu, Vennira Aadai Nirmala and Srividya in supporting roles. The film was produced by P. S. K. Karunakaran and distributed by R. B. Choudary of Super Good Films. It was released after a two-year delay.

== Plot ==
Kamarasu hails from a village and is employed as a driver with an industrialist Latha, who treats Kamarasu as her own son. Kamarasu is very affectionate towards his widowed mother and takes care of her. Kamarasu falls in love with Vasanthi, who also hails from his village. Kamarasu is kind towards everyone and earns the love of the villagers. Unfortunately, Kamarasu's mother passes away, which shatters Kamarasu. However, he comes back to normal with the help of Vasanthi's love and affection. A few days later, Vasanthi also passes away due to a lightning strike, which makes Kamarasu worry a lot. Kamarasu decides to spend the rest of his life serving the needy people as he has lost both his mother and lover. Latha takes care of Kamarasu, and he sees her as his mother.

One day, Latha and her daughters meet with an accident and are admitted in a hospital with multiple organ failure. The doctor informs Kamarasu that Latha needs a heart transplant immediately, while her daughters need other organ transplants such as liver, eyes, etc. Kamarasu requests the doctor to take his organs, thereby saving Latha and her daughters, for which the doctor does not agree. Kamarasu kills himself by jumping out of the window so that his organs can be donated to Latha and her daughters. The doctor performs the transplantations, which saves Latha and her daughters. Knowing this, Latha feels sad but at the same time proud about Kamarasu's sacrifice. The movie ends with a message about organ donations.

== Cast ==
- Murali as Kamarasu
- Laila as Vasanthi
- Vadivelu as Velu
- Vennira Aadai Nirmala as Kamarasu's mother
- Srividya as Latha
- C. R. Saraswathi as Vasanthi's mother
- Chandrasekhar as Doctor
- Delhi Ganesh as Advocate
- Madhan Bob
- Anu Mohan
- Bala Singh
- Sanjeev as Rogue
- Bayilvan Ranganathan
- Singamuthu
- Lavanya
- S. Ve. Shekher as Special appearance in "Pottu Mela"
- Ragasudha as Special appearance in "Pottu Mela"
- Master Mahendran

== Production ==
Director Anbazhagan had proposed the story to R. B. Choudary in 1998 during a coincidental meeting on Marina Beach and subsequently impressed him after reading a collection of short poems and stories he had written, before being given the opportunity to narrate a story. Daniel Balaji worked as an assistant director and helped Laila learn her lines. The film was delayed for two years, with Choudary reviving it for release.

== Soundtrack ==
The soundtrack was composed by S. A. Rajkumar.

Song	Singers	Lyrics
"Aalayangal Thevayillai"	Swarnalatha S.P.Balasubramanyam	Mu. Metha
"Chinna Chinna Kannukulle"	K. S. Chithra, P. Unnikrishnan	Muthulingam
"Chinna Chinna Vilakke"	Hariharan	Arivumathi
"Mazhaya Mazhaya Ippo"	S. A. Rajkumar, Mano, Swarnalatha	Mu. Metha
"Oru Murai"	Nagore E. M. Hanifa	Mu. Metha
"Paathi Nila"	K. S. Chithra, S. P. Balasubrahmanyam	Mu. Metha
"Pottu Mela"	Krishnaraj, Sujatha	Kalidasan

== Critical reception ==
Malathi Rangarajan of The Hindu wrote that the film was "late by at least three decades. Obsolete in concept, characterisation and presentation, a sense of déjà vu sets in very early." Malini Mannath of Chennai Online wrote "With a script of this type, the cast could hardly do much here. There is a lot of unintended humour, some of the shots are repeated over and over, the director seeming to lose track of the characterisation and ambience". Cinesouth wrote, "Story haven't failed in adding excitement here and there. But a slow pace that makes the viewer squirm uneasily and situations that are very predictable turn out to be the flaws. The sudden sorrow that grips the climax doesn't seem to be accepted that well by the audience".
