= S. P. Rajkumar =

Indian film director

- Occupation: Director
- Years active: 1997–present

S. P. Rajkumar is an Indian film director, who directs Tamil films.

== Career ==
He started his film career as a dialogue writer for the 1997 film Once More. In 1998, he directed his first feature film Ponmanam, which was a hit. His subsequent ventures En Purushan Kuzhandhai Maadhiri (2001) and Karmegham (2002) were both unsuccessful. A proposed film in 2003 titled Thoodhu with Bhavana was shelved.

Only after six years, he started his next project Azhagar Malai (2009), which received highly negative reviews . He directed Vijay's 50th film, Sura (2010). The following films were comedies titled Pattaya Kelappanum Pandiya (2014), Paakanum Pola Irukku (2017) and Local Sarakku (2023).

== Filmography ==
=== As director ===
==== Films ====
Year	Film	Notes
1998	Ponmanam	
1998	En Uyir Nee Thaane	
2001	En Purushan Kuzhandhai Maadhiri	
2002	Karmegham	
2009	Azhagar Malai	
2010	Sura	
2014	Pattaya Kelappanum Pandiya	
2017	Paakanum Pola Irukku	
2023	Local Sarakku	

==== Serials ====
Year	Serial
2019–2020	Magarasi
2023–present	Poova Thalaya
2026–present	Ennavale

=== As actor ===
Year	Title	Role	Notes
1994	Nattamai	Deaf man	
1994	Rasigan	A person who mistakes Ekamabaram as a beggar	
1995	Periya Kudumbam	A person who waits at the bus stop	
2001	En Purushan Kuzhandhai Maadhiri	Angusaamy's friend	
2005	6'2	A person who warns Mr. White not to fight	

=== As lyricist ===
- "January Nilave" (En Uyir Neethane)
- All songs (Pattaya Kelappanum Pandya)
- "Vaazhavaikkum" (En Purushan Kuzhandhai Maadhiri)
- "Vetri Kodi Yethu" (Sura)
