= Vaimaye Vellum =

- Title card
- Directed by: P. Vasu
- Written by: P. Vasu
- Produced by: S. R. Balajee
- Starring: Parthiban; Rachna Banerjee
- Cinematography: Raveendar
- Edited by: P. Mohanraj
- Music by: Deva
- Production company: S. B. Films
- Release date: 14 February 1997
- Running time: 150 minutes
- Country: India
- Language: Tamil

Vaimaye Vellum (spelt in the title credits as Voimaye Vellom; transl. Truth alone triumphs) is a 1997 Indian Tamil-language crime drama film directed by P. Vasu. The film stars Parthiban and Rachna Banerjee. It was released on 14 February 1997.

== Plot ==
Maari is a notorious gangster and industrialist who terrorises the city through kidnapping, extortion, and murder. He lures impoverished young men into their employ, only to brutally eliminate them after exploiting their labour, through his henchman Kaasi. This pattern has resulted in the gruesome deaths of 22 innocent youths. In response to the escalating violence, the DGP assembles a special force comprising officers from various police stations along the East Coast Road. Perumal, a corrupt police inspector with a tainted past, is transferred to the same area in Northern ECR after 20 years. Perumal's first wife died during childbirth, leading him to believe that his newborn son brought him an ill fortune. He names the boy Yama Dharman, after the God of Death. Despite being an intelligent student, Dharman faces his father's disdain. However, his stepmother, Saraswathi showers him with affection, and affectionately addresses him as "Raja."

Yama Dharman "Raja", grew up in a juvenile prison after being falsely accused by his father, Perumal. Raja now works as a rickshaw driver and occasionally takes on jobs as a paid goon. He cannot tolerate injustice and frequently finds himself in jail. Raja's life takes a turn when he confronts his father and vows to get him dismissed from service. Currently, Raja resides in the home of Iyer, a temple priest while the jewels of the temple deity where Iyer is working are under the care of wealthy industrialist Sivaraman. Meanwhile, Mohan Ram, a victim of Maari and Kaasi's extortion racket, shares his story with a journalist who publishes a detailed exposé in his magazine, Senior News. Maari, disguising himself as Alex, hires Perumal to attack the journalist. However, the journalist learns of the planned attack through Constable Kannaiya and hires Raja to protect his daughter, Meena. Raja successfully safeguards Meena. The next day, Meena attends an interview, but Kaasi and Perumal frame her for prostitution, leading to her arrest. Raja bails her out, following his mother Saraswathi's instructions.

Meena's father returns from Madurai and is murdered by Kaasi, who makes it appear as a suicide due to his daughter's alleged prostitution. Devastated, Meena attempts to take her own life, but Raja rescues her and proposes marriage to avenge his father's wrongdoing. Raja and Meena get married and move into Perumal's house, but he rejects them. Kaasi publicly humiliates Kannaiya, prompting Raja to intervene and beat Kaasi. Perumal seizes this opportunity to arrest both Raja and Kaasi. However, SP Rajendran, who had previously bailed out a young Raja 20 years ago, intervenes and secures Raja's release once again. Meena recognises Kaasi and informs Raja, suspecting a connection between Kaasi and the 22 murders, as well as her father's death. Before Kaasi can turn approver in court, Maari silences him permanently and escapes. Perumal gets suspended from his job for allowing an approver to be killed while in custody. Perumal, still blaming Raja for his misfortunes, publicly assaults him. Raja confronts his father, asserting that Perumal's abusive behaviour has ruined their family. Meena takes Raja to Iyer's house, where Iyer encourages Raja to solve the case that led to Perumal's suspension.

Raja vows not only to reinstate his father but also to reform him into a righteous person. Rajendran advises Perumal to reform and solve the case, promising to help him regain his job. Meanwhile, Raja spots Maari in a temple procession and later confronts him when Maari attacks Raja while he's taking Meena to the hospital. Raja subdues Maari, but he escapes, only to be killed mysteriously shortly after. Raja confiscates Maari's mobile phone and, with Iyer's assistance, discovers Sivaraman's connection and learns about the next planned abduction. Raja informs Perumal about the impending abduction of a rich businessman's son. Perumal leads a police team to rescue the victim. Raja confronts Sivaraman, while a shootout ensues between the police and the kidnappers. Ultimately, the businessman's son is rescued, and Sivaraman is arrested. Iyer reveals to Perumal that Raja was the one who tipped him off about the kidnapping. As a result of his bravery, Perumal is rewarded, and the reformed Perumal accepts the award from his son Raja.

== Cast ==
- Parthiban as Yama Dharman "Raja"
- Rachna Banerjee as Meena
- Rajan P. Dev as Perumal, Raja's father
- Visu as Iyer, a temple Priest
- Janagaraj as Michael, Raja's friend
- Vennira Aadai Nirmala as Saraswathi
- Jojan as Maari
- Majid as Kaasi
- Vijay Krishnaraj as Meena's father
- Pandu as Constable Kannaiya
- Mohan V. Ram as Mohan Ram
- Hemanth Ravan as Sivaram, temple chief
- Prathapachandran as the DGP
- Kullamani as masseuse's assistant
- Mayilsamy as Mayilsamy
- Chelladurai as a Constable
- Sachu as Sivakami, Iyer's wife
- Jyothi Lakshmi as masseuse's mother
- Jyothi Meena as masseuse
- T. K. Rajeswari
- Master Mahendran as Young Raja (uncredited)
- Radha Ravi in a special appearance as SP Rajendran

== Production ==
Some scenes were shot at Rajaji Hall.

== Soundtrack ==
The soundtrack was composed by Deva, with lyrics written by Vaali.

Song	Singer(s)	Duration
"Amma"	P. Unni Krishnan	4:44
"Bagalu Bagalu"	Deva, Malgudi Subha	4:55
"Bagalu Bagalu"	Shahul Hameed, Malgudi Subha	4:55
"Dhinamthorum"	Malaysia Vasudevan, Deva	5:01
"Kuiyil Pattu"	Krishnaraj, K. S. Chithra	4:57
"Maaman Parkiran"	Mano, Swarnalatha	5:08

== Reception ==
The film opened to positive reviews from critics. K. N. Vijiyan from New Straits Times named it the fifth best Tamil film of 1997. Two years after release, the producers were given a ₹5 lakh subsidy by the then Tamil Nadu Chief Minister M. Karunanidhi along with ten other films.
