= Kavalai Padathe Sagodhara =

- Directed by: Keyaar
- Screenplay by: Keyaar
- Produced by: Aru. Subramaniam
- Starring: Pandiarajan; Suvaluxmi
- Cinematography: B. L. Rao
- Edited by: R. T. Annadurai
- Music by: Ilaiyaraaja
- Production company: Subbu Films Productions
- Release date: 13 April 1998
- Country: India
- Language: Tamil

Kavalai Padathe Sagodhara (transl. Don't worry brother) is a 1998 Indian Tamil language comedy drama film, written and directed by Keyaar. The film stars Pandiarajan and Suvaluxmi, while K. R. Vijaya and Janagaraj portrayed supporting roles. The music was composed by Ilaiyaraaja and the film was released on 13 April 1998. It is a remake of the Malayalam film Kalyanji Anandji.

== Cast ==
- Pandiarajan
- Suvaluxmi as Philomena (Meena)
- K. R. Vijaya
- Janagaraj
- S. S. Chandran as Vasool Baaba
- Raghuram
- Prakash Raj
- Radharavi
- Vadivukkarasi
- Manivannan
- Loose Mohan
- Idichapuli Selvaraj

== Soundtrack ==
Music was composed by Ilaiyaraaja. The song "Chinna Chinna" is set to the raga Kapi.

Song	Singers	Lyrics
"Thiruvonam Thirunalam"	Ilaiyaraaja, Sujatha	Panchu Arunachalam
"Arule Arul"	Devi Neithiyar, Geetha	Arivumathi
"Iswar Allah"	Ilaiyaraaja, Mano, Yugendran	Panchu Arunachalam
"Chinna Chinna"	Devi Neithiyar, P. Unnikrishnan, Arunmozhi, S. N. Surendar	Panchu Arunachalam
"Mama Poo Poo"	Mano, K. S. Chithra	Vaali

== Release ==
The film was released on 13 April 1998. Two years after release, the producers were given a ₹5 lakh (equivalent to ₹21 lakh or US$22,000 in 2023) subsidy by the Tamil Nadu government along with several other films.
