= Chinna Durai (1999 film) =

- Title card
- Directed by: R. Chandra
- Written by: R. P. Viswam (dialogues)
- Screenplay by: R. Chandra
- Story by: R. Chandra
- Produced by: K. Balu
- Starring: Sarathkumar; Roja; Sithara
- Cinematography: P. Selvakumar
- Edited by: R. T. Annadurai
- Music by: Ilaiyaraaja
- Production company: K. B. Films
- Release date: 13 March 1999
- Running time: 145 minutes
- Country: India
- Language: Tamil

Chinna Durai is a 1999 Indian Tamil-language drama film directed by R. Chandra. The film stars Sarathkumar and Roja whilst Sithara, Vijayakumar and Manivannan play supporting roles. It was released on 13 March 1999.

== Cast ==
- Sarathkumar as Chinnadurai
- Roja as Pushpavalli
- Sithara as Maragatham
- Manivannan
- R. Sundarrajan
- Vijayakumar
- Ponnambalam
- Bayilvan Ranganathan
- C. R. Saraswathi
- Ragasudha
- Periya Karuppu Thevar
- Thyagu
- LIC Narasimhan

== Production ==
The film marked the directorial debut of Chandra who earlier assisted Aabavanan. Chandra's earlier directorial venture Conductor Mappillai remains unreleased and the way Chandra handled the budget impressed producer Balu who offered him the opportunity to direct Chinna Durai. The filming was entirely held at Pollachi.

== Soundtrack ==
The soundtrack was composed by Ilaiyaraaja.

Song	Singers	Lyrics	Length
"Kolusu Konjam"	P. Unnikrishnan, Devie Neithiyar	Palani Bharathi	05:08
"Maragathakutty"	Devie Neithiyar, S. P. Balasubrahmanyam	Arivumathi	05:03
"Pakkathile Nee Irundhum"	Devie Neithiyar, S. P. Balasubrahmanyam	Vaasan	05:00
"Maattikitta"	Mano	Vaasan	04:57
"Neeye Kathi"	Sujatha	Pulamaipithan	04:55
"Unnaipola"	S. P. Balasubrahmanyam	Arivumathi	05:04

== Critical reception ==
Deccan Herald wrote "The best things in Chinna Dorai are the child, who’s not more than six months old, Mani Vannan and the costumes, particularly those of Roja and Sharath Kumar". D. S. Ramanujam of The Hindu said the film "would have generated more response had it had been released some five years ago. So old fashioned are the story, screenplay and direction of R. Chandra with each weather-beaten turn being easily predictable".
