= Annai (2000 film) =

2000 film by Manobala

- Title card
- Directed by: Manobala
- Written by: Manobala
- Dialogue by: Kavitha Bharathi; Rajprabhu
- Produced by: S. Suresh
- Starring: Bhanupriya; Nassar; Baby Sarika
- Cinematography: B. Kannan
- Music by: Dhina
- Production company: SG Telearts
- Release date: 11 February 2000
- Country: India
- Language: Tamil

Annai (transl. Mother) is a 2000 Indian Tamil-language drama film written and directed by Manobala. The film stars Bhanupriya, Nassar and Baby Sadhika while Ramesh Khanna, Manobala, and Mayilsamy among others form an ensemble cast. Music for the film was composed by Dhina and the film was released on 11 February 2000.

== Plot ==
A wealthy widow named Kanagamahalakshmi, who loses her husband and unborn child in a car crash, opts to look after an orphan child for a period of one month every year. Her decision operates smoothly for a few years. However, when the child, Anjali, returns to the house for a third year, problems begin to arise. She expresses her distaste at the various deficiencies of Kanagamahalakshmi's household, including her foster parent herself. How Anjali makes the members in the house behave properly forms the rest of the story.

== Cast ==
- Bhanupriya as Kanagamahalakshmi
- Nassar as Kanagamahalakshmi's husband
- Baby Sadhika as Anjali
- Manobala as Moses
- Ramesh Khanna
- Mayilswamy
- Madhan Bob
- Halwa Vasu
- Thadi Balaji
- Chaplin Balu
- Mano
- Rajeswari

== Production ==
The film was shot on a shoestring budget of ₹33 lakh (equivalent to ₹1.5 crore or US$150,000 in 2026) within 14 days.

== Soundtrack ==
The music was composed by Dhina.

Song	Singers	Lyrics
"Aaraariro Aaraario"	Swarnalatha	Kadhal Mathi
"Chinna Chinna"	Nithyashree Mahadevan, P. Unnikrishnan	Kadhal Mathi
"Hey Chittuku Chittan"	Anuradha Sriram	Kadhal Mathi
"Vennilavae Vennilavae" I	Kalyani Menon	Kadhal Mathi
"Vennilavae Vennilavae" II	Swarnalatha	Kadhal Mathi

== Reception ==
Krishna Chidambaram of Kalki criticised the director for treating the theme of adoption half-heartedly. S. R. Ashok Kumar of The Hindu appreciated Kannan's cinematography, the dialogues by Kavitha Bharathi and Rajprabhu, and Manobala's writing and direction, but felt Dhina's music "at times drifts away" from the main story.
