= Once More (1997 film) =

1997 Indian film

- Theatrical release poster
- Directed by: S. A. Chandrasekaran
- Written by: S. P. Rajkumar (Dialogues)
- Screenplay by: S. A. Chandrasekaran
- Story by: Shanmugapriyan
- Produced by: C. V. Rajendran
- Starring: Sivaji Ganesan; Vijay; Simran; Saroja Devi
- Cinematography: Selva. R
- Edited by: B. S. Vasu; Saleem
- Music by: Deva
- Production company: Shree Ganesh Vision
- Release date: 4 July 1997
- Running time: 161 minutes
- Country: India
- Language: Tamil
- Budget: ₹50 lakh
- Box office: ₹8.95 crore

Once More is a 1997 Indian Tamil-language romantic comedy film directed by S. A. Chandrasekaran. The film stars Sivaji Ganesan, Vijay, Simran and Saroja Devi in the lead roles, while Manivannan, Charle, S. S. Chandran and Anju Aravind play supporting roles. It incorporates footage from Iruvar Ullam (1963) as flashback scenes of Ganesan and Saroja.

Once More was released on 4 July 1997 and became a commercial success. It was remade in Telugu as Daddy Daddy (1998).

== Plot ==
Vijay, a young businessman whose only aim in life is to have fun, is the managing director of a big tea estate in Ooty. His company suffers a big loss due to his mismanagement. Vijay spends most of his time partying and flirting with girls. To manage the loss to his company, Vijay invites his father Rajashekar, who is in the United States, to come to India to sign some documents. Unfortunately, Rajashekar dies in a plane crash on his way to India. Vijay's maternal uncle Ashok comes up with the idea of having another elderly person act as Vijay's father for a while until the documents are signed. They visit a senior home in Coimbatore, where they meet Selvam, one of the residents, and they request him to act as Vijay's father. He agrees to it and starts acting as Vijay's father.

Selvam observes Vijay's careless, easy-going lifestyle and is reminded of his own youth when he used to be like Vijay. Selvam is very affectionate towards Vijay and starts to consider him his son. Vijay finds out about Selvam's past life, that Selvam was married to Shantha, and they have been living separately for the past 34 years. He wants them to reunite, so he searches and finds Shantha's whereabouts. Meanwhile, Kavitha joins Vijay's company and talks to Vijay in her own style. Kavitha's beauty knocks Vijay out, and he falls in love with her. Then, their love gets into trouble because of Kavitha's mother. Now, Vijay tries to unite Selvam and Shantha, while in return, Selvam tries to unite Vijay and Kavitha. Kavitha first tries to kill Vijay to avenge her sister Anju, who committed suicide due to Vijay rejecting her love for him. But through Ashok and Selvam, Kavitha understands Vijay's good heart and reunites with him. Also, Selvam and Shantha meet once again and get married 'Once More'. The film hence ends with a happy note.

== Cast ==
- Sivaji Ganesan as Selvam
- Vijay as Vijay
- Simran as Kavitha
- Saroja Devi as Shantha
- Manivannan as Ashok, Vijay's maternal uncle
- Anju Aravind as Anju
- Charle as Kesavan Nair
- S. S. Chandran as Shanmugasundaram (SS)
- Thalapathy Dinesh as Karthik, Shantha's relative
- Mohan Raman as Tension Thiyagarajan
- C. R. Saraswathi as Lakshmi, Kavitha and Anju's mother
- Mannangatti Subramaniyam as Mani, Shantha's bodyguard
- Chaplin Balu as Ramu
- S. A. Chandrasekhar as Rajashekar, Vijay's father (voiceover)

== Production ==
The director, S. A. Chandrasekhar, convinced Sivaji Ganesan to feature in the film after Sathya Sai Baba told him to continue acting for this role. Scenes from Iruvar Ullam (1963) were also featured extensively in the film, being used as flashback scenes depicting the backstory of Ganesan and B. Saroja Devi's characters. Saroja Devi considered Once More to be a sequel to Iruvar Ullam.

The film marked one of the two debuts of actress Simran in Tamil cinema, with Once More and her other film, V.I.P. both releasing on 4 July 1997. Simran had earlier rejected Tamil films including Bharathiraja's proposed Siragugal Murivathillai, and had garnered popularity in the Tamil film industry prior to the release of her first film. She worked on Once More alongside her commitments for V.I.P., Nerrukku Ner (1997) and Poochudava (1997).

== Soundtrack ==
The soundtrack was composed by Deva. The audio rights were acquired by Pyramid Audio and Music Master.

Tracklist
No.	Title	Lyrics	Artist(s)	Length
1.	"Chinna Chinna Kaadhal"	Vairamuthu	Malaysia Vasudevan, Krishnaraj, Deva, Anuradha Sriram	05:46
2.	"Malargale"	Vairamuthu	S. N. Surendar, Anuradha Sriram	05:21
3.	"Ooty Malai Beauty"	Palani Bharathi	Mano, Swarnalatha	05:01
4.	"Oormila Oormila"	Vairamuthu	Vijay, Shoba Chandrasekhar	04:46
5.	"Poove Poove Penpoove"	Vairamuthu	S. N. Surendar, K. S. Chitra	05:07
Total length:				26:21

== Critical reception ==
K. N. Vijiyan New Straits Times wrote that the film was a good family entertainer. Ananda Vikatan rated the film 39 out of 100.
