= Unnai Kann Theduthey =

- Title card
- Directed by: Sundar C
- Screenplay by: Sundar C.
- Story by: P. Kalaimani
- Produced by: Kantilal Bhansali
- Starring: Sathyaraj; Khushbu; Livingston; Ravali
- Cinematography: U. K. Senthil Kumar
- Edited by: P. Sai Suresh
- Music by: Deva
- Production company: Popular Films
- Release date: 1 September 2000
- Running time: 132 minutes
- Country: India
- Language: Tamil

Unnai Kann Theduthey (transl. My eye is searching for you) is a 2000 Indian Tamil-language comedy thriller film that was written and directed by Sundar C, starring Sathyaraj, Khushbu, Livingston and Ravali.

== Plot ==
The police find a dead body in a river holding on to a 'thaali' and a wedding invitation. They begin an investigation that takes them to a house where wedding preparations are in full swing.

== Cast ==
- Sathyaraj as Vichu (Sandanapandian I.P.S)
- Khushbu as Charulatha
- Livingston as Raghu
- Ravali as Gayathri
- Manivannan
- Senthil
- Vivek
- Kovai Sarala as Valayapatti Vallikannu
- Periya Karuppu Thevar
- Jai Ganesh
- Chelladurai
- Delhi Ganesh
- Madhan Bob
- Mayilsamy
- R. Sundarrajan
- Tharika as Vaidehi
- Sachu
- Sukumari as Ranganayaki
- Manya
- Sathyapriya
- Balu Anand as Pattabi
- C. R. Saraswathi
- Nellai Siva
- Mansoor Ali Khan
- Thalapathy Dinesh
- Sujith Sagar

== Soundtrack ==
Music was composed by Deva.

Song	Singers	Lyrics
"Aaki Vecha"	S. Janaki, P. Unnikrishnan	Kalaikumar
"Paatu Ithu"	K. S. Chithra, Mano	Palani Bharathi
"Poo Poovaa"	S. P. Balasubrahmanyam, Febi Mani	Pa. Vijay
"Theduthe Unnai Kann"	Ganga, Devan	Pa. Vijay
"Vaada Vaada"	Sujatha	Pa. Vijay

== Reception ==
Tamil Star wrote "Midway through Unnai Kann Theduthey, I forgot that it was a Sundar.C movie. Until then, the movie, set in a marriage hall, had all the hallmarks of his movie - lots of characters, confusion and comedy. But at the midpoint, a murder is introduced into the proceedings and for a while thereafter, the movie shows signs of developing into an intriguing whodunnit. But the movie flatters to deceive. The murder mystery is resolved in the least interesting way possible with the no twists regarding the identity of the murderer and the motive turning out to be completely ordinary. After all the attempts at building up tension, the climax too is a cop-out that leaves several questions unanswered". India Info wrote "The suspense is engaging and Sathyaraj's funny dialogues and the whole wedding atmosphere add to the entertainment. Sathyaraj proves to be the just the right choice for the role and does full justice to it. One has to overlook lot of loose ends in the murder plot though. Ravali looks cute. Senthilkumar’s camera and Deva's music are average". Malini Mannath of Chennai Online wrote, "One expected some cat-and-mouse games to follow. But the cat being quite reluctant to catch the mouse, and the mouse too not showing the slightest inclination to escape or fight back, it all ends on a tame note. There are many artistes and characters, but not one stays in the mind". K. N. Vijiyan of New Straits Times wrote "Sundar C. is back with a comedy tinged with suspense. This is difficult but has made it entertaining".
