= Ponmanam =

- Poster
- Directed by: S. P. Rajkumar
- Written by: S. P. Rajkumar
- Produced by: V. Natarajan
- Starring: Prabhu; Suvalakshmi; Priya Raman
- Cinematography: Rameshgandhi
- Edited by: K. Thanigachalam
- Music by: S. A. Rajkumar
- Production company: Pyramid Films International
- Release date: 14 January 1998
- Running time: 140 minutes
- Country: India
- Language: Tamil

Ponmanam (transl. Heart of gold) is a 1998 Indian Tamil-language drama film directed by debutant S. P. Rajkumar and produced by V. Natarajan. The film stars Prabhu, Suvalakshmi and Priya Raman. It was released on 14 January 1998.

== Plot ==
Anandhan (Prabhu), a kind-hearted singer, is married to Maheshwari (Suvalakshmi) and they are parents of a baby boy. He lives in a house leased by Naidu (Manivannan). Kumar (Karan), a youth who is supposed to work in a bank, moves into a new house near Anandhan's house. Poornima (Priya Raman), a middle-class family woman, quarrels with Anandhan on multiple occasions.

One day, Poornima tells Anandhan about her bitter past. When Poornima's family was in Sri Lanka, a bomb killed Poornima's mother, amputated her sister's legs and blinded another sister. Now, Poornima had to work hard to support her family. After hearing her past, Anandhan becomes Poornima's friend but Poornima falls in love with him. Kumar then proposes his love to Maheshwari because Anandhan revealed to him that they were not married.

In the past, Anandhan was a jobless graduate and was from a poor family. Anandhan's sister Shanthi eloped with her lover. Later, Anandhan's parents cannot digest it and they hung themselves. So Anandhan attempted to suicide in turn but there, he saved Maheshwari and her nephew from drowning. Her brother-in-law killed her sister and Maheshwari had to escape with her sister's baby. To face the troubles, they decided to live together without marrying.

Poornima's boss (Nizhalgal Ravi) wants to marry Poornima, her father accepts and begs Anandhan to forget his daughter. Anandhan lies to Poornima that he never loves her and then she challenges to marry another man. Poornima marries her boss and Anandhan is humiliated during the wedding. Maheshwari and Kumar then marry and leave the city. Meanwhile, Anandhan finds himself alone again and decides to raise Maheshwari's nephew.

== Cast ==
- Prabhu as Anandhan
- Suvalakshmi as Maheshwari
- Priya Raman as Poornima
- Karan as Kumar
- Manivannan as Naidu
- Delhi Ganesh as Poornima's father
- Nizhalgal Ravi as Poornima's boss
- Charle
- Mayilsamy
- Muthukaalai
- K. R. Vatsala
- Crane Manohar
- Anuja
- Ra. Sankaran (special appearance)

== Soundtrack ==
The soundtrack were composed by S. A. Rajkumar.

| Song | Singer(s) | Lyrics | Duration |
|---|---|---|---|
| "Azhaga Azhaga" | S. P. Balasubrahmanyam, S. A. Rajkumar, Sujatha Mohan | Kamakodiyan | 4:14 |
| "Nilavodum" | K. J. Yesudas | Ilandevan | 4:39 |
| "Pattamboochi" | P. Unni Krishnan, Sujatha Mohan | Arivumathi | 4:38 |
| "Nilavinai Thottu" | Ganga | Palani Bharathi | 4:59 |
| "Vaanambadi" | S. P. Balasubrahmanyam | Palani Bharathi | 4:47 |

== Reception ==
D. S. Ramanujam of The Hindu wrote, "The definition of love has undergone many changes in recent Tamil movies where special contrived reasons are put forth to see that the hero's love does not materialise. Pyramid Films International's Pon Manam has, no doubt, such an element which fits in naturally in a well-structured storyline, director S. P. Rajkumar taking credit, with his story, screenplay and dialogue". A writer from Screen noted that "the family drama highlighted by an excellent performance by Prabhu, has been attracting family audiences and even though the collections are not 100 per cent, the trade expects it to emerge a winner after a slow start."
