= En Purushan Kuzhandhai Maadhiri =

2001 film by S. P. Rajkumar

- Poster
- Directed by: S. P. Rajkumar
- Produced by: K. S. Rajagopal
- Starring: Livingston; Devayani; Vindhya
- Cinematography: Ramnath Shetty
- Edited by: Thanikachalam
- Music by: Deva
- Production company: RR Movie Makers
- Release date: 9 March 2001
- Country: India
- Language: Tamil

En Purushan Kuzhandhai Maadhiri (transl. My Husband is Like a Child) is a 2001 Indian Tamil language comedy film directed by S. P. Rajkumar. The film stars Livingston, Devayani and Vindhya in lead roles. The music was composed by Deva. The film was remade in Telugu as Maa Ayana Chanti Pilladu.

== Plot ==
Murugesan (Livingston) is a rich landlord in a village but is illiterate as well as innocent. He is in love with his cousin Maheshwari (Devayani) right from childhood. Maheshwari also likes Murugesan but she wants him to overcome his innocence and be brave. Santhamoorthy (Ponnambalam) is Murugesan's half brother and enmity prevails between him and Murugesan. Chinthamani (Vindhya) is a dancer who comes to Murugesan's village to perform. Chinthamani's mother forces her into prostitution but Murugesan saves her and accommodates in his farm house.

Murugesan's and Maheshwari's wedding is fixed and the day before wedding, Santhamoorthy tries to kill Murugesan but Murugesan fights back the goons. Murugesan who is drunk now rushes to his farmhouse to get some weapons to kill Santhamoorthy. Chinthamani who lives in the farm house tries to stop Murugesan from committing the murder and accidentally they enter into a physical relationship. Murugesan feels guilty of the incident and wants to cancel his wedding with Maheshwari. But Maheshwari's father (R. Sundarajan) convinces Murugesan to not cancel the wedding.

Maheshwari and Chinthamani both get pregnant now. Chinthamani wants to abort her child and visits an elder lady, but Santhamoorthy plays trick by changing the medicine so that the child grows well. Chinthamani feels bad that Murugesan's life is at stake because of her. But Murugesan understands that it was his fault too and takes care of Chinathamani as well. One day, Maheshwari finds out the truth and quarrels with Murugesan.

Both Maheshwari and Chinthamani give birth to baby boys. Santhamoorthy plans to kill Maheshwari's baby, but Chinthamani interrupts and saves the baby. During the fight, Chinathamani falls from a mountain and dies in the process of saving Maheshwari's baby. Maheshwari now realises Chinthamani's kind heart. Murugesan and Maheshwari take care of both the babies now. Santhamoorthy also realises his mistake and bonds with Murugesan.

== Cast ==
- Livingston as Murugesan
- Devayani as Maheswari
- Vindhya as Sinthamani
- Vadivelu as Angusaamy
- R. Sundarrajan as Maheswari's father
- Ponnambalam as Santhamoorthy
- Vinu Chakravarthy as Pazhanisamy
- C. R. Saraswathi as Maheswari's grandmother
- Mayilsamy as Dr. Kuyilsaamy
- Bonda Mani as Villager
- Muthukaalai as a Madman
- Jayakumar as Murugesan's supporter
- Japan Kumar as a dancer in "Pattampoochi" (special appearance)

== Soundtrack ==
Soundtrack was composed by Deva.

| Song | Singers | Lyrics |
|---|---|---|
| Vaazhavaikkum | Sabesh, Krishnaraj | S. P. Rajkumar |
| Chithiraye | Hariharan, Anuradha Sriram | Kamakodiyan |
| Vennila | P. Unnikrishnan, Sathya | Kamakodiyan |
| Naaladi Aaru Angulam | Vadivelu | 'Karupur' Ramu |
| Pattampoochi | Mano, Anuradha Sriram | Kalaikumar |
| Aadiya Aattam | Deva | Kalaikumar |

== Critical reception ==
S. R. Ashok Kumar of The Hindu wrote "The director must have taken care to give sufficient reason to get his protagonist involved with another woman, a day before his marriage. But the justification given for this and also for a couple of other reactions, are not acceptable". Malini Mannath of Chennai Online wrote "The plot did have the potential to make it an engaging entertainer. But the problem is that the director couldn't really decide as to what type of treatment he should give his plot. Whether it should be in the genre of a comedy or a melodrama, of a family sentiment or of a saga of a family feud. So he makes a hotchpotch of the whole thing, and it does not help matters". Visual Dasan of Kalki wrote Vadivelu's comedy is the only thing that makes us sit and watch the film. Cinesouth wrote "Director Rajkumar has made the most of an ordinary story. He can take pride in creating certain lively scenes and catchy dialogues. Though he has sustained the tempo of the film in the first half, he has a fall in the second half as his concentration had drifted away by then. Thereby, the story becomes somewhat dull in the end. However, 'En Purushan Kuzhandhai Madhiri' is a clever child".
