= Muthukaalai =

Indian actor and comedian

- Born: 6 February 1965 (age 61); Tirukovilpuram, Virudhunagar, Tamil Nadu, India
- Other name: Ponmanam Muthukaalai
- Occupation: Comedian
- Years active: 1994-present

Muthukaalai is an Indian actor and comedian who works in Tamil cinema.

== Early life and career ==
Muthukaalai was born in Tirukovilpuram near Rajapalayam and dreamt of becoming a stunt choreographer. While studying in school, he received his black belt in karate. He came to Chennai in 1990. He did various small jobs including working as a carpenter at AVM Studios for three years. Muthukaalai worked alongside Stun Siva in Kadhalukku Mariyadhai (1997). He forayed into acting with Ponmanam (1998) after fellow stunt choreographer Kanal Kannan backed out of the film. He played comedic characters and he gained popularity with his appearances in the comedy tracks of Vadivelu especially the dialogues "Sethu Sethu Vilayaduvoma" (transl. Let's play dead) and "Neeyum naanum onna Thiruparankundram malaiyil irunthu kuthichu sethuponome. Gnayabagam illa? (transl. You and I together jumped from Thiruparankundram hill and died. Don't you remember?) from En Purushan Kuzhandhai Maadhiri (2001) and his chicken 65 comedy with Vadivelu in Diwan (2003).

== Personal life ==
He has three college degrees: BA in History in 2017, MA in Tamil Literature in 2019 and Bachelors of Tamil Literature in 2023.

== Selected filmography ==
- Kaadhalan (1994) (uncredited; special appearance in "Urvasi Urvasi")
- Ponmanam (1998)
- En Uyir Nee Thaane (1998)
- Nilave Mugam Kaattu (1999)
- Vaalee (1999) as roadside shop customer (uncredited)
- Suyamvaram (1999)
- Minsara Kanna (1999)
- Iraniyan (1999)
- 12B (2001)
- Thavasi (2001)
- En Purushan Kuzhandhai Maadhiri (2001)
- Pammal K. Sambandam (2002)
- Thamizhan (2002) (uncredited)
- Panchatanthiram (2002)
- Youth (2002)
- Karmegham (2002)
- Album (2002)
- Anbe Sivam (2003)
- Dum (2003)
- Punnagai Poove (2003)
- Diwan (2003)
- Thiruda Thirudi (2003)
- Winner (2003)
- Pithamagan (2003)
- Joot (2003)
- Kavithai (2004)
- Perazhagan (2004)
- Aayutha Ezhuthu (2004)
- Sullan (2004)
- M. Kumaran Son of Mahalakshmi (2004)
- Neranja Manasu (2004)
- Meesai Madhavan (2004)
- Jananam (2004)
- Ramakrishna (2004)
- Maayavi (2005)
- Selvam (2005)
- Majaa (2005)
- Aanai (2005)
- Sorry Enaku Kalyanamayidichu (2005)
- Kodambakkam (2006)
- Sudesi (2006)
- Imsai Arasan 23rd Pulikecei (2006)
- Sillunu Oru Kaadhal (2006)
- Perarasu (2006)
- Kizhakku Kadarkarai Salai (2006)
- Veerasamy (2007)
- Mozhi (2007)
- Sivaji: The Boss (2007)
- Kireedam (2007)
- Cheena Thaana 001 (2007)
- Valluvan Vasuki (2008)
- Kaalaippani (2008)
- Kathavarayan (2008)
- Surya (2008)
- Thoranai (2009)
- Aarumaname (2009)
- Kannukulle (2009)
- Pinju Manasu (2009)
- 365 Kadhal Kadithangal (2010)
- Kandaen (2011)
- Yuvan Yuvathi (2011)
- Nanda Nanditha (2012)
- Yugam (2012)
- Gouravam (2013)
- Pattathu Yaanai (2013)
- Pagadai Pagadai (2014)
- Sagaptham (2015)
- 36 Vayadhinile (2015)
- Saalaiyoram (2016)
- Pei Irukka Bayamen (2021)
- Lockdown Diarie (2023)
- Kick (2023)
- Chandramukhi 2 (2023)
- Indha Crime Thappilla (2023)
- Sri Sabari Ayyappan (2023)
- Mudakkaruthaan (2024)
- Rathnam (2024)
- Madha Gaja Raja (2025) as Rajesh's teammate
- Otha Votu Muthaiya (2025)
- Yaman Kattalai (2025)
- Enai Sudum Pani (2025)
- Mr Zoo Keeper (2025)
- Lucky The Superstar (2026)
