= K. P. Jagan =

Indian actor and film director

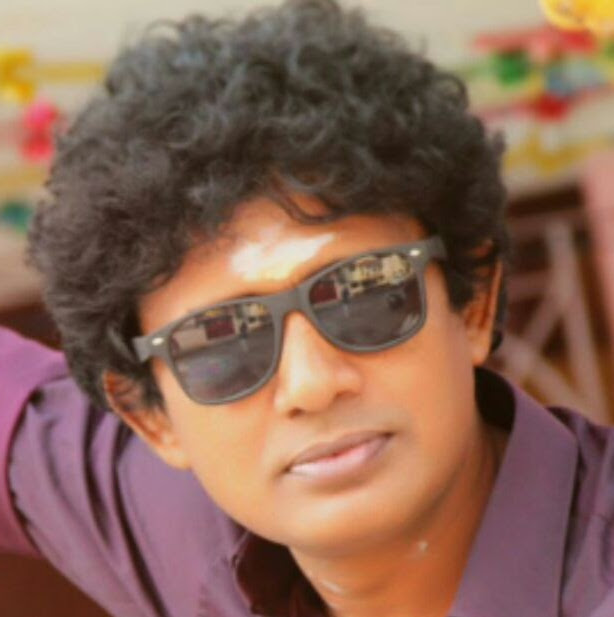
- K. P. Jagan @ Jagannaath
- Born: K. P. Jagannath; Komarapalayam, Namakkal, Tamil Nadu
- Other name: Jagannaath
- Occupations: Director, Actor
- Years active: 2003–present
- Spouse: Thadshayini (m. 2009)

K.P. Jagan, also known as Jagannaath, is an Indian actor and director. He directed the films Pudhiya Geethai (2003), Kodambakkam (2006), and Raman Thediya Seethai (2008). He made his acting debut with Mayandi Kudumbathar.

== Career ==
Jagan had begun his career in the film industry as an office worker for T. Rajender, before moving on to work as a make-up artist for film actors. He later became acquainted with Cheran, before working as his assistant.

The project was titled Geethai and was set to feature Vijay in the lead role with Esha Deol as heroine. However the film eventually featured two lead actresses with Meera Jasmine being signed on to be a part of the project after the success of her 2002 film, Run. Amisha Patel also accepted to be a part of the film, replacing Deol, after getting the entire script translated in English for her to read. Before release, the film's title was changed to Pudhiya Geethai.

The film opened to mixed reviews. The critic from The Hindu stated that "the end is predictable, but the conviction with which the climax drives home the message makes it interesting." Another reviewer stated the film had "nothing new", describing it as "real melodramatic soap-opera that moves hearts of viewers and at the same time gives a message for the audience." The film was below average at box office.

Jagan's third directorial Raman Thediya Seethai was announced in 2007 and the photo session was held at the time of launch. Gajala was selected as one of the leads and Remya nambeesan from Kerala was selected and she joined in second schedule. Vimala Raman of Poi, Karthika Adaikalam of Thoothukudi and Navya Nair were selected since the story needed five heroines Pasupathi and Nithin Sathya were selected to play important roles.

Director Jagan said that "There are 78 scenes whereas there are 94 locations in the film" and added that "in most of the scenes there would be a small flashback and if this is taken into consideration then there are more locations in the film rather than scenes".

Rediff wrote: "There's a delicate balance between portraying a genuinely touching story and going overboard with emotions. And that's where Global One Studio Productions' Raman Thediya Seethai (Rama's Hunt for Seetha), directed by Jagannaath, manages to be different". Behindwoods wrote:"The director needs to be appreciated for delivering a film without kissing or glamorous scenes. However, he could have tried to make the subject a bit more interesting". Sify wrote:"RTS is riveting cinema and exhibits emotional depth and is a clean feel-good family entertainer".

After the film's good response at box office, Jagan announced that his next directorial titled Roja Malli Kanakambaram would be produced by him and was to feature Nithin Sathya along with newcomers and was supposed to feature Malayalam actor Dileep in important role but financial problems led the film to be shelved.

== Personal life ==
He is married to Thadsaginy, a Sri Lankan-based Tamil girl in 2009.

== Filmography ==
=== As actor ===
Year	Film	Role	Notes
2009	Mayandi Kudumbathar	Cheenichamy Mayandi	
2010	Milaga	Eswaran furniture owner	
2010	Goripalayam	Sangu Ganesan	
2012	Ambuli	Poogeswaran	
2012	Muthukku Muthaaga		
2013	Nagaraja Cholan MA, MLA		
2013	Azhagan Azhagi	Police Ganesan	
2013	Chithirayil Nilachoru	Jagan	
2014	Kandupidi Kandupidi		
2014	Sutrula	David	
2015	Kangaroo	Manigandan	
2015	Pasanga 2		
2019	Namma Veetu Pillai	Paari's brother-in-law	
2022	Etharkkum Thunindhavan	Kannabiran's lawyer friend	
2025	Thalaivan Thalaivii	Logu	

=== As director ===
Year	Film	Notes
2003	Pudhiya Geethai	
2006	Kodambakkam	
2008	Raman Thediya Seethai	
2017	En Aaloda Seruppa Kaanom	

=== As story and dialogue writer ===
Year	Film	Notes
2019	Miga Miga Avasaram	
