= Kodambakkam (film) =

- VCD cover
- Directed by: K. P. Jagan
- Produced by: V.S. Satheesan; Kathir Seveal
- Starring: Nandaa; Diya; Tejashree
- Cinematography: U.K. Senthil Kumar
- Music by: Sirpi
- Production company: AAA Productions
- Release date: 10 February 2006
- Country: India
- Language: Tamil

Kodambakkam is a 2006 Indian Tamil-language film by K. P. Jagan, starring Nandaa, Diya and Tejashree. It was released on 10 February 2006.

== Plot ==
Sugavannan, an aspiring director from a village, has been working as an assistant director to Cheran. He approaches a distributor-turned-producer with a female-centric story for his film, "Neyar Viruppam." However, the producer rejects the idea and advises Sugavannan to change the script. Undeterred, Sugavannan and his friends remain committed to making this story his first film.

Later, Sugavannan receives a telegram incorrectly stating that his mother had died, and he rushes to his village in a panic. However, upon arrival, he is relieved to find his mother alive. There he reminisces about his past love Dhanam. Sugavannan's dream of becoming a director in the Tamil film industry drives him to write letters to directors and short stories for magazines. Dhanam encourages him to pursue opportunities in Chennai. When Sugavannan leaves for Chennai, Dhanam's father discovers their relationship and beats her.

In the present, production manager Pulikumar introduces Sugavannan to Ramasamy Gounder, who agrees to produce the film if his farm employees approve of the story. The villagers like the film, and Gounder decides to produce it, believing its success is assured by astrology. He even changes his name to Rajaram. The film's shooting begins with an actress from Bombay, Reethu, who demands luxuries and creates tension on set. Gounder's interference leads to a verbal argument with Sugavannan, causing him to halt production. To his astonishment, Sugavannan finds Dhanam at his mansion upon his return. Meanwhile, in the village, Dhanam's father confronts Sugavannan's mother, enraged by his daughter's elopement. Gounder plans to leave for Pollachi after halting the film's production, but Pulikumar persuades him to continue. Sugavannan apologizes to the entire crew, and Gounder agrees to proceed with the film.

In a separate incident, Reethu attempts suicide upon learning that her lover has married another woman. Sugavannan intervenes, and Reethu, now reformed, cooperates with him, understanding the significance of his first film. Gounder realizes that production costs have exceeded the budget, but Pulikumar assures him of the film's success. Pulikumar sells his jewelry to fund the final song, and the movie is completed. The film is screened for the CBFC, which suggests some cuts, but Sugavannan convinces them to grant a U certificate. However, distributors and theater owners, after a special screening, refuse to buy the movie, predicting its failure at the box office and suggesting it's only suitable for awards.

On the first day of release, Sugavannan's movie fails to debut as scheduled, leading to his mother's public humiliation in front of the villagers. Overcome with shame, she collapses and passes away at the movie theater entrance. Upon hearing this news, Sugavannan rushes back to the village. Ironically, a group of drunkards arrives at the theater, intending to mock the film and pass the time. However, they are unexpectedly impressed by the movie, which goes on to receive critical acclaim. The film enjoys a successful theatrical run, generating profits for the producer, who rewards Sugavannan and his wife Dhanam with a luxurious car and a flat.

== Cast ==
- Nandha as Sugavannan
- Diya as Dhanam
- Tejashree as Reethu, an actress from Bombay
- Manivannan as Ramasamy Gounder (Rajaram)
- Ramesh Khanna as Pulikumar, a production manager
- Kalairani as Sugavannan's mother
- Manobala as a distributor-turned-producer
- Thambi Ramaiah as Dhanam's father
- Ganja Karuppu as Moorthy, Sugavannan's friend
- Muthukaalai as Nallathambi, Gounder's employee
- K. Sivasankar as himself
- Sridhar as himself ("Oh Pappa")

== Production ==
Kodambakkam was Jagan's second film as director after Pudhiya Geethai (2003). Nandaa's flashback was shot at a village Navalpatti near Mettur. In order to portray the role of an assistant director, he observed all the departments of filmmaking.

== Soundtrack ==
The soundtrack was composed by Sirpy.

Song	Singers	Lyrics
"Adi Nee Oru"	Murugan Iyer, Srilekha Parthasarathy	Vijay Sagar
"Kodambakkam Engalukku"	Shankar Mahadevan, Sathyan	Jeevan Mayil
"Oh Paappa Oh Paappa"	Jassie Gift, Mukesh Mohamed	Vijay Sagar
"Ragasiyamanathu" (duet)	Harish Raghavendra, Harini	Vijay Sagar
"Ragasiyamanathu" (female)	Harini	Vijay Sagar
"Sarcha Meri"	Malgudi Subha, Ceylon Manohar	Raheeb Alam

== Reception ==
Malini Mannath of Chennai Online wrote protagonist's "struggles as an assistant director, his attempts to strike it independently, the agony and the ecstasy as he alternates between the high and the low, are all depicted with insight and a fair degree of realism by the director. The punch in the dialogue and the steady pace of the narration, make it a fairly engaging entertainer". The Hindu wrote, "In typical commercial format, Kodambakkam brings the foibles of the film fraternity to the fore. The maker doesn't need big names to back him this time, as he is on familiar ground". Lajjavathi of Kalki praised the performances of actors and Senthil Kumar's cinematography. Koodal wrote that Kodambakkam has some sentiments, but stories told in cinema have never been such big hits, and wondered if Kodambakkam would break that sentiment. Kalairani won the Tamil Nadu State Film Award for Best Character Artiste (Female).
