= Unnai Thedi =

1999 Tamil film directed by Sundar C

- Poster
- Directed by: Sundar C
- Screenplay by: Sundar C
- Story by: Sundar C
- Produced by: K. Muralidharan; V. Swaminathan; G. Venugopal
- Starring: Ajith Kumar; Malavika
- Cinematography: U. K. Senthil Kumar
- Edited by: P. Sai Suresh
- Music by: Deva
- Production company: Lakshmi Movie Makers
- Release date: 5 February 1999
- Running time: 151 minutes
- Country: India
- Language: Tamil

Unnai Thedi (transl. In search of you) is a 1999 Indian Tamil-language romantic drama film written and directed by Sundar C. The film stars Ajith Kumar and debutant Malavika, while an ensemble supporting cast includes Karan, Vivek, Sivakumar, and Srividya. It was released on 5 February 1999, and became a box-office hit. Later, the film was dubbed and released in Telugu as Prematho Pilicha on 24 December 1999.

== Plot ==
Raghupathy, studying in Australia, goes to New Zealand with a friend and runs into Malavika. They start off having petty fights but end up falling in love. Circumstances force them to separate before exchanging any contact information.

Back at home, Raghu makes friends with Prakash and chances upon his family photograph which surprisingly includes his mother Saradha, who as far as he knew had no relations. But on questioning, his mother reveals past as that she was part of a large family (three brothers and a sister) but had been sent out of the family after deciding to wed someone of her choice.

Raghu decides to reunite her with her brothers, travels to the village as Prakash's friend and soon endears himself to the members of his family. Turns out Malavika is the daughter of one of the brothers too. But when he learns that Prakash wishes to marry her, he decides to bow out. But to the contra, Prakash, on knowing both love each other, wishes that they have to unite.

The family elders too agree to Raghu marrying Malavika, however, refuse to let the alliance go any further after learning that Raghu is Saradha's son. Raghu too agrees to sacrifice his love since he does not want to wed Malavika and cause even more friction in the already fractured family.

How Raghu eventually reunites the separated family and weds Malavika forms the crux of the film.

== Cast ==
- Ajith Kumar as Raghupathi
- Malavika as Malavika
- Sivakumar as Adhi Narayanan
- Moulee as Sivaraman
- Srividya as Sharadha
- Vivek as Vivek
- Karan as Prakash
- Manorama as Maragatham
- Swathi as Chitra
- Jai Ganesh as Shankaran
- Rajeev as Moorthy
- Sathyapriya as Rajalakshmi
- Vaiyapuri as Vaiyapuri
- Shanmugasundaram as Raghupathi
- Vinu Chakravarthy as Sandhanapandi
- Mahanadi Shankar as Muthupandi
- Kaka Radhakrishnan as Valaiyapathi
- Madhan Bob as Ramakrishnan
- Singamuthu
- Nellai Siva
- Periya Karuppu Thevar as Periya Karuppu
- Halwa Vasu
- Khushbu in a cameo appearance

== Production ==
The original plot point was recommended by Singampuli, one of Sundar C's assistant directors and Sundar wrote the script within a week, before discussing the line with actor Ajith Kumar. Ajith was initially unimpressed but agreed to do the love story anyway, mentioning that if the film became a success he would feature in a future film to be directed by Singampuli; that film became Red (2002). The producers initially approached Laila to play the female lead; however she refused to commit to any other films until the release of her Kallazhagar. The role went to newcomer Shweta Konnur, who was given the stage name Malavika by the director. The film began its shoot in late 1998 with scenes being canned in Australia and in Christchurch, New Zealand, as well as India.

== Soundtrack ==
The soundtrack was composed by Deva. Deva reused most of the background music from Annamalai without changing it in this film.

Song	Singers	Lyrics	Length
"Malavika"	Hariharan, K. S. Chitra	Kalaikumar	05:01
"Naalai Kalai"	Hariharan	Palani Bharathi	05:06
"Neethana"	Hariharan, Sujatha	Palani Bharathi	04:54
"Poraale"	Hariharan	Palani Bharathi	04:52
"Oyila Oyila"	Mano	Palani Bharathi	04:45
"Kaatraga Varuvaya"	Naveen	Ra. Ravishankar	05:04

== Reception ==
Unnai Thedi received positive reviews from K. N. Vijiyan of New Straits Times, and D. S. Ramanujam of The Hindu. The film was one of the hit films among several films that Ajith Kumar had featured in throughout 1999, while the chemistry between the lead pair prompted them to sign another film together, Anantha Poongatre. The film was later partly remade in Bengali as Bandhan.
