= JK Enum Nanbanin Vaazhkai =

2015 Indian film by Cheran

- Poster in Tamil
- Directed by: Cheran
- Written by: Cheran
- Produced by: Cheran (Tamil); N. Venkatesh (Telugu)
- Starring: Sharwanand; Nithya Menen
- Cinematography: Siddharth
- Edited by: G. Ramarao
- Music by: Songs: G. V. Prakash Kumar; Score: Siddharth Vipin
- Production companies: Dream Theatres; Brundavan Pictures
- Release dates: 6 March 2015 (Tamil); 24 June 2016 (Telugu)
- Running time: 139 minutes
- Country: India
- Languages: Tamil; Telugu

JK Enum Nanbanin Vaazhkai (transl. Life of a friend named JK) is a 2015 Indian Tamil-language romantic drama film written and directed by Cheran, which was partially reshot in Telugu as Rajadhi Raja (transl. King of Kings). It stars Sharwanand and Nithya Menen while Prakash Raj and Santhanam play supporting roles. The film featured songs by G. V. Prakash Kumar and film scored by Siddharth Vipin.

After failing to have a theatrical release in late 2013, the Tamil version had a direct-to-video release on 6 March 2015, becoming the first venture in a new initiative launched by Cheran known as Cinema2Home (C2H). The Telugu version had been indefinitely placed on hold, but was later released theatrically on 24 June 2016, with the makers trying to profit from Sharwanand's popularity. Siddharth won the Tamil Nadu State Film Award for Best Cinematographer.

== Plot ==
Jayakumar, commonly known as JK, is a mid-20s man who does not care about family. Instead, he is obsessed with chatting on Facebook, partying, and passing time with friends. At work, he has a group of friends with similar interests. They all plan on going for a New Year Party.

Two years later, JK is shown to be a changed person – very invested in developing, earning money and taking care of his family. He is shown to make business models with an aim of earning a lot of money in a short period of time. He has goals such as getting his two sisters married and ensuring that his brother gets good education. In attempts to start business, he goes to meet a bank manager at his home. As they had to wait for the bank manager to come, JK and his friend notice that the house is not well-maintained and take on the job to organise it. Upon returning, bank manager appreciates their work and tells JK and his friend that it would be very helpful if they could help clean homes regularly. He also suggests that about 150 other flats in his apartment complex would also appreciate this service. This becomes JK's first business venture. For this, he also ropes in help from his school friend Nithya. Together, JK, Nithya, and their friends go on to become very successful with multiple projects.

Later, the reason for change in JK's behaviour is explained. When JK and friends were planning to go for the New Year Party, Ravi also wants to go with them and becomes a good friend of JK. Ravi comes from a very poor background, and his family is dependent on him. After the party, the gang meets with an accident, resulting in Ravi's death and a serious head injury for JK. JK has only a couple of years left in his life. This makes him realise the importance of life, and he decides to make his family happy and make sure that they have enough money before he dies. However, JK does not tell this to anyone but Nithya. In the end, JK leaves the responsibilities of business and his family to Nithya and goes off to the USA (where he would likely die because of his illness). Nithya is shown to be running the business and living with memories of time spent with her best friend JK.

== Cast ==
- Sharwanand as T. Jayakumar "JK"
- Nithya Menen as Nithya
- Prakash Raj as Rudhratchagan
- Santhanam as Thothathri and Paartha (Tamil version only)
- Singapore Kanna as Raghavendran Kannan
- Jayaprakash as L. Padmanabhan
- Manobala as Drawing Artist
- Kitty as JK's father
- Rishi as Wedding Groom
- Vishwak as JK's colleague
- Naveen George Thomas as JK's colleague

Guest appearances

- Sneha as herself
- Prasanna as himself
- VTV Ganesh as a wedding guest (Tamil version only)
- G. V. Prakash Kumar as himself in the song "Who is JK" (Tamil version only)

== Production ==
Work on the film began in mid-2012. It marked Cheran's return to direction after a brief hiatus, and was his most expensive film to that point. Cheran stated that, unlike his previous films, this was meant to appeal to younger audiences but would still bear his trademark "touch". Cheran also produced the film via Dream Theatres. Cinematography was handled by Siddharth, editing was by Rama Rao, and Gayathri Raguram and Robert were the dance choreographers.

Sharwanand signed on as the lead actor after being impressed with the script and desisted from signing other projects after committing to this film. A non-native Tamil speaker, Sharwanand still chose to dub in his own voice with Cheran helping him develop a Tamil accent. The song "Hey Facebook Login Pannu" was shot on a set that cost ₹25 lakh (equivalent to ₹46 lakh or US$48,000 in 2026), and had been constructed to resemble the interface of Facebook.

== Music ==
The soundtrack was composed by G. V. Prakash Kumar. The soundtrack album was released by Cheran's music company Dream Sounds Digital Solution on 15 September 2013. The score was composed by Siddharth Vipin who also composed three additional songs for the film. Karthik of Milliblog wrote: "Cheran's last film as director – Pokkisham – had fantastic music from Sabesh Murali; the move to GV Prakash Kumar produces underwhelming results".

Tamil
No.	Title	Lyrics	Singer(s)	Length
1.	"Facebook Login Pannu"	Madhan Karky	G. V. Prakash Kumar, Neha Bhasin	03:52
2.	"Nee Enna Pesuvai"	Na. Muthukumar	G. V. Prakash Kumar, Saindhavi	05:00
3.	"Get Ready For My Mojo"	Madhan Karky	Vijay Prakash, Ramya NSK	05:24
4.	"Uyire Uyire"	Yugabharathi	Benny Dayal, Ramya NSK	05:15
5.	"Who Is JK"	Cheran	G. V. Prakash Kumar	01:17
Total length:				20:08

Telugu
No.	Title	Singer(s)	Length
1.	"Facebook Login Chesi"	G. V. Prakash Kumar, Ranina Reddy	03:52
2.	"Nuvvu Emi Chepi"	G. V. Prakash Kumar, Pooja	05:00
3.	"Get Ready For My Mojo"	Ranjith, Ranina Reddy	05:24
4.	"Manasa Manasa"	Rahul Nambiar, Maya	05:15
5.	"Who Is JK"	G. V. Prakash Kumar	01:17
Total length:			20:08

== Marketing and release ==
As part of the promotion Cheran initiated a project named JK Fest 2013, in which college students from Tamil Nadu could participate. Students were asked to visualise and use their creativity to enact the songs of JK Enum Nanbanin Vaazhkai without knowing the film's story. Cheran revealed that the film would be released on the internet, DVD and satellite, on the same day of its theatrical release. He believed this move could help curb piracy. However, the theatrical release did not happen; the film instead had a direct-to-video release on 6 March 2015, the first via Cheran's Cinema2Home (C2H) initiative. The Telugu version, initially titled Yemito Ee Maya, was later retitled as Rajadhi Raja and released theatrically on 24 June 2016, with the makers attempting to profit from Sharwanand's resurgence at the Telugu box office.

== Reception ==
Baradwaj Rangan wrote for The Hindu, "JK Enum Nanbanin Vaazhkai feels like Cheran's attempt to show that he isn't, anymore, the sentimental, melodramatic filmmaker whose good intentions haven't always resulted in good movies (or good box-office collections). He's trying to show us that he can be young, hip", adding that the film "may have worked if Cheran had stuck to his style". Sify wrote, "JK Ennum Nanbanin Vazhkai is a breezy feel good film with colorful visuals, enchanting score and well sketched characters". Regarding the Telugu version, a critic from The Hans India made similar comments. Siddharth won the Tamil Nadu State Film Award for Best Cinematographer.
