= Pasakiligal =

- Title card
- Directed by: Amirtham
- Written by: M. Karunanidhi
- Produced by: Rama Narayanan
- Starring: Prabhu; Murali; Navya Nair; Vineeth
- Cinematography: M. V. Panneerselvam
- Edited by: Rajkeerthi
- Music by: Vidyasagar (songs); Sabesh–Murali (score)
- Production company: Sri Thenandal Films
- Release date: 15 January 2006
- Country: India
- Language: Tamil

Pasakiligal (transl. Affectionate Parrots) is a 2006 Indian Tamil-language drama film directed by Amirtham and written by M. Karunanidhi. It stars Prabhu, Murali, Navya Nair, and Vineeth, while Roja, Vadivelu, Nassar, Kalabhavan Mani, Malavika, and Manorama play supporting roles.

== Plot ==
Sethupathy (Prabhu) and his young brother Sevathayya (Murali) are fond of their only sister, Maragadham (Navya Nair), who lives in Melur village. Vairaghya Bhoopathy (Nassar) is the chief of the neighboring village Aalur, and the two families have been rivals for generations. But Maragadham falls for Nallarasu (Vineeth), Bhoopathy's brother. Then comes Alakalan (Kalabhavan Mani), a schemer who wants to marry Maragadham. Both the brothers humiliate him and send him back. He ends up marrying Bhoopathy's sister Angayarkanni (Roja) but manages to create an enmity between the two families. Meanwhile, a dancer (Malavika) falls in love with Sethupathy. Alakalan has an eye on her as well. A turn of events results in Bhoopathy's suicide. Now, Nallarasu takes revenge on Sethupathy, who was responsible for his brother's death, so he marries Maragadham only to torture her. The rest of the film is about how Sethupathy and Sevathayya reveal Alakalan's true colors, and as predicted, all comes to a happy ending.

== Cast ==
- Prabhu as Sethupathy
- Murali as Sevathayya
- Navya Nair as Maragadham
- Vineeth as Nallarasu
- Roja as Angayarkanni
- Vadivelu as Thandavan
- Nassar as Vairaghya Bhoopathy
- Kalabhavan Mani as Alakalan
- Malavika
- Manorama
- Singamuthu
- Halwa Vasu

== Production ==
The filming was held in Chennai, Karaikudi, and Madurai. A song featuring Vineeth and Navya was shot at Ramoji Film City, while a song featuring Prabhu and Malavika was picturised at Badami, Belur, and Halabedu. The introductory song of Navya Nair was picturised at falls at Chalakudy.

== Soundtrack ==
Pasa Kiligal

Soundtrack album by Vidyasagar
- Released: 8 January 2006
- Genre: World Music
- Producer: Vidyasagar

Vidyasagar chronology
Aathi (2006)	Pasa Kiligal (2006)	Thambi (2006)

Vidyasagar composed the music for the film. The audio was launched at Kamala Theatre.

- "Aruviyoda" - K. S. Chithra
- "Thendral Ennum" - Madhu Balakrishnan
- "Thangai Endra" - Tippu, Karthik, Sujatha, Manorama
- "Meesai Mutham" - Tippu, Sujatha
- "Karutha Machan" - Manikka Vinayagam, Srilekha

== Reception ==
Malini Mannath of Chennai Online wrote, "There's nothing new or exciting about the script (Kalaignar Karunanidhi), narration or performance. It's like you're watching a couple of decades old film. Further, the narrative style is stagey, the camera almost static, the actors at most times standing in front of the camera and delivering their lines to it, apprehensive of moving away even an inch lest they go out of the frame!" Sify wrote, "Pasakilikal is a dreary, drab old fashioned tale which would have worked in [the] 60’s or 70’s".
