= Aadum Koothu =

- Directed by: T. V. Chandran
- Written by: T. V. Chandran
- Produced by: N. Krishnakumar (Kireedam Unni)
- Starring: Navya Nair; Cheran; Prakash Raj; Pandiarajan; Aari Arujunan; Seeman; Manorama
- Cinematography: Madhu Ambat
- Edited by: Venugopal
- Music by: Isaac Thomas Kottukapally
- Production company: Light And Shadow Movie Makers (P) LTD
- Release dates: 15 December 2006 (IFFI); 9 May 2008
- Running time: 106 minutes
- Country: India
- Language: Tamil

Aadum Koothu is a 2006 Indian Tamil romantic drama film written and directed by T. V. Chandran and starring Navya Nair, Cheran, Prakash Raj, Aari Arujunan, Seeman, and Manorama. The film premiered at the 37th International Film Festival of India in 2006 and had a limited release across theatres in 2008. Later, Zee Tamizh telecast this film. The film received critical praise and won the National Film Award for Best Feature Film in Tamil.

== Cast ==
- Cheran as Gnanasekaran
- Navya Nair as Manimegalai
- Prakash Raj as Zamindar
- Sukumari as Aachi
- Manorama as the Dalit woman
- Jagathy Sreekumar as Dr. John Santhosham Vedhamuthu
- Rekha as Manimekhala's mother
- Thalaivasal Vijay
- Cochin Haneefa
- Seeman as Zamindar's son and grandson
- Indrans
- Akhil Kumar as Muthu
- Pandiarajan
- Meenal as Deivanayaki
- Shanti Williams
