= Thairiyam =

- Poster
- Directed by: P. Kumaran
- Produced by: P. Kumaran
- Starring: P. Kumaran; Karthika; Deepu
- Cinematography: Navaneethakrishnan
- Music by: R. D. Mohan Singh; M. N. Surendhar
- Production company: RP Creations
- Release date: 29 January 2010
- Running time: 100 mins
- Country: India
- Language: Tamil

Thairiyam (transl. Braveness) is a 2010 Indian Tamil-language action film written and directed by P. Kumaran, who produced the film under RP Creations. The film stars Kumaran alongside Karthika, and Deepu, while Radha Ravi, Ponnamabalam, Devan, and Riyaz Khan play supporting roles. The film was released on 29 January 2010.

== Plot ==
Kumaran saves his girlfriend, Deepu from the menacing Riyaz Khan. Following a duel with Kumaran, Riyaz slips into a coma but the intrigue lies in the fact that all Riyaz' friends are killed. Several twists and turns involving the evil-minded villain Kamaraj form the crux of the film.

== Cast ==
- P. Kumaran
- Karthika as Jennifer
- Deepu as Ramya
- Radha Ravi
- Ponnamabalam
- Devan
- Riyaz Khan as Mohan
- Kalatpadai Jai
- M. Kamaraj
- Rekha
- Pragathi
- Aarthi
- Alex
- Ajay Rathnam
- Manobala
- Saravana Subbiah
- Vasu Vikram
- Thaadi Balaji
- Ganeshkar
- Kottachi
- Kovai Senthil
- Velmurugan
- Pandiarajan as Guest appearance

== Production ==
The film went through a silent change of director prior to release with the original director M. Sarojkumar being replaced by the lead, Kumaran as the film was in development due to Sarojkumar's ill health. Furthermore, in September 2009, a stunt sequence towards the climax was shot for over 15 days and involved hundreds of extras. Three time Mr India title winner Kamaraj plays the antagonist.

== Soundtrack ==
Thairiyam

Soundtrack album by R. D. Mohan Singh
- Released: 17 December 2009
- Recorded: 2009
- Genre: Film soundtrack

The film score and soundtrack were composed by newcomer R. D. Mohan Singh.

Track list
No.	Title	Singer(s)	Length
1.	"Ilamiyil Mogam"	Harish Raghavendra, Anuradha Sriram
2.	"Kathal Ena Kathal"	Deva
3.	"Mathura Maliye"	Tippu, Malathi
4.	"Puthu Varusham"	S. P. Balusubrahmanyam

== Reception ==
A critic from The Hindu claiming it was an "okay first attempt". In regard of the performances the critic claimed that Kumaran "passes the litmus test. Nevertheless, he must take care of his make-up". Whilst actresses Deepu as Ramya is "average" but manages to get more frames than the heroine. Karthika as Jennifer is said to "look good but has nothing much to do but stand beside the hero". Whilst in regard to the production it cites that Kumaran, who multi-tasks – writing the story, screenplay, dialogue, acting, directing and producing – "seems to lose concentration here and there".
