= Maya Kannadi =

- Poster
- Directed by: Cheran
- Written by: Cheran
- Produced by: Subbu Panchu
- Starring: Cheran; Navya Nair
- Cinematography: Dwarakanath
- Edited by: Ayyappan-Ramarao
- Music by: Ilaiyaraaja
- Production company: Chellamai Celluloids
- Release date: 14 April 2007
- Running time: 180 minutes
- Country: India
- Language: Tamil

Maya Kannadi (transl. Mirror of Illusion) is a 2007 Indian Tamil-language drama film directed by Cheran and produced by Subbu Panchu. Cheran also plays the lead role with Navya Nair. Ilaiyaraaja scores the music, while R. Sarathkumar, Arya and Malavika make cameo appearances. It was released on 14 April 2007.

== Plot ==
Kumar is a young man who comes from Thiruvannamalai to Chennai with dreams and hopes about the future. He gets a job in a men's beauty parlor in Chennai. Every day, he observes and learns more about life in the city. He starts to dream and build castles in the air. Maheswari works in another beauty parlor and also has desires of her own. The rest of the story is about what happens to these two people. This three hour-long film has similar themes compared to Cheran's previous films. The key message in this film is that each person's life is in his or her own hands.

== Cast ==
- Cheran as Kumar
- Navya Nair as Maheshwari
- Radha Ravi
- Jayaprakash
- Bharathi Kannan
- Vinod Raj as Maheshwari's father
- Crane Manohar
- Kavingar Muthulingam as struggling actor

Cameo appearances

- Arya as himself
- Sarath Kumar as himself
- Malavika as herself
- Ranjitha as herself
- Raj Kapoor as himself
- Bobby Simha as barber customer (uncredited; seen in beginning of film)

== Production ==
Jayaprakash, who earlier worked as producer, made his acting debut with this film. Cheran, who plays a barber, learnt and practiced haircutting for his role. He also spent four days rehearsing for a dance sequence.

== Soundtrack ==
Soundtrack was composed by Ilaiyaraaja.

Song	Singers	Lyrics
"Ulagile Azhagi"	Vijay Yesudas, Nanditha	Mu. Metha
"Oru Mayalogam"	Tippu, Manjari	Palani Bharathi
"Yele Enga Vantha"	Ilaiyaraaja	Vaali
"Kaadhal Indru"	Ilaiyaraaja	Muthulingam
"Kaasu Kaiyil"	Ilaiyaraaja	Muthulingam
"Konjam Konjam"	Karthik, Shreya Ghoshal	Pa. Vijay

== Critical reception ==
Shwetha Bhaskar of Rediff.com wrote, "A brave film indeed for not resorting to the usual cliches and daring to go where very few filmmakers dare to go -- the ordinary realm of the despondency of the common man." Sify wrote, "We wish Cheran had whipped up a more winsome screenplay with Mayakannadi, which is based on middle class dreams turning sour due to lack of commitment. It's nowhere in the league of the talented director's previous works like Autograph or Thavamai Thavamirunthu." Malathi Rangarajan of The Hindu wrote "Cheran's much awaited film does not live up to its expectations. One does not know what Cheran wants to convey through Chellammai Celluloids "Maayakkannaadi," in which positive aspect is thoroughly missing".

Lajjavathi of Kalki praised Cheran for narrative style despite finding the message of giving up dreams rather weird while praising the acting of Cheran and other actors, found Ilayaraja's songs as average but praised Dwarakanath's cinematography and concluded saying Cheran has a good sense of what people expect from him through Maya Kannadi. Cheran must be thankful for this time glass that is useful for that!. Malini Mannath of Chennai Online wrote, "Cheran steps away from the rural milieu and into a totally urban-centric plot in 'Mayakkanadi'. The director-hero, while conveying a relevant message through his film, keeps the proceedings fairly engaging for the most part. But what is missing here is the sense of completeness which we had experienced while watching the director's earlier films".
