= Sila Nerangalil =

- Poster
- Directed by: Jayaraj
- Written by: Pattukkottai Prabakar (dialogue)
- Screenplay by: Jayaraj
- Story by: Raj R.
- Produced by: Raj; Naresh; Felix; Kishore; Sri
- Starring: Vincent Asokan; Navya Nair; Vineeth; Raghuvaran
- Cinematography: Rajavel
- Edited by: A. Sreekar Prasad
- Music by: Srikanth Deva
- Production company: New Light Productions Ltd
- Release date: 29 February 2008
- Country: India
- Language: Tamil

Sila Nerangalil (transl. Sometimes) is a 2008 Indian Tamil-language romantic thriller film directed by Malayalam director Jayaraj in his Tamil debut. The film stars Vincent Asokan and Navya Nair, while Vineeth and Raghuvaran play supporting roles. The music was composed by Srikanth Deva. The film received positive reviews and was an immediate box office success, reaching number two in the Tamil film charts in its first week of release. The film was an uncredited remake of the American romantic thriller film, Dead Again (1991).

== Plot ==
A murder case that took place in the mid-60s is narrated through a voice and radio news as the titles role on. A man is accused of murdering his wife and has been sentenced to death.

The film then moves forward with a dream by a girl (Navya Nair), who dreams of getting killed by a man. The girl is clad in an old-style dress, resembling the trends of the '60s. She is not able to identify the man nor could she rationalise her dream. However, she is terribly frightened, so much so that she could not speak, recall her past, and get to terms with the present.

She is now in a home run by Christian missionaries. She is under care of the Jo (Vincent Asokan), the person in charge for the rehabilitation of physically and mentally challenged people. He names her Anjali and develops a secret love towards her.

Enters psychiatrist Krishnan (Raghuvaran), an expert in hypnotist therapy, who comes forward to help them. The therapy reveals that she is Anjali reincarnation of the girl, who was allegedly killed by her husband in 1965. The shocking revelation gives her the power of speech back, but still, she is unable to recall her past in this birth.

Further sittings with the psychiatrist reveal the possible reason for the murder. The husband suspected an affair between his wife and his friend, a famous playback singer Madhavan (Vineeth). The scenes surfaced in hypnotic sleep identify the husband. It is none other than Jo, who is the reincarnation of the husband. Now, Anjali is afraid of Jo, and the doctor starts counselling Jo by putting him into hypnotic sleep. Jo, in his travel to his previous birth, finds that the husband was not responsible for the murder. Both Anjali and doctor are not ready to accept his words, and they suspect that he would repeat the effort in this birth as well.

Jo, who is in love with Anjali, is shaken and determined to find the truth. This leads him searching the missing lines of the murder that took place 40 years ago. The script reveals the truth with many unexpected twists in the tale. Jo and his friend go and ask Madhavan, the singer who loved Thamarai, the girl who was killed. He tells them that her husband saw a boy talking to his mother about lying in the court. Madhavan says that the killer is a person named Gopikrishnan, and Jo understands immediately that he means the hypnotist Krishnan, who helped Anjali.

== Cast ==
- Vincent Asokan as Jo / Chidambaram
- Navya Nair as Anjali / Thamarai
- Vineeth as Madhavan
- Raghuvaran as Krishnan
- Ramesh Khanna as Photographer
- Sriman as Gopikrishnan
- Manobala as Rajavel
- VTV Ganesh as Ganesh

== Production ==
The film marked the directorial debut of Jayaraj in Tamil while the film saw Vincent Asokan playing lead actor for first time.

== Soundtrack ==
The music was composed by Srikanth Deva, with lyrics by Vairamuthu.

Song	Singers
"Embavai Embavai"	Senthildass Velayutham, Reshmi
"Ponguthu Ponguthu"	T. M. S. Selvaraj
"Thirudapatta Nilave"	Haricharan, K. S. Chithra
"Pottu Vaitha"	P. Susheela
"Chella Phonai"	Suchitra

== Reception ==
Rediff.com wrote, "Altogether, a nice fare if you're in the mood for a good old-fashioned crime thriller". Tamil Star wrote, "While director Jayaraj manages to keep the suspense intact in a few places in this two-hour movie, it is clear that crafting such a shape-shifting screenplay has eluded even a good director like him". Lakshmi Saravanakumar of Kalki felt the fast pace in the first and last scene was completely missing in rest of the scenes and despite the scope of offering twists and turns, most of them were predictable due to faulty screenplay. He also felt Vincent Asokan was ill-suited for the role.
