= Pokkisham =

- Poster
- Directed by: Cheran
- Written by: Cheran
- Produced by: Nemichand Jhabak; V. Hitesh Jhabak
- Starring: Cheran; Padmapriya; Aryan Rajesh
- Cinematography: Rajesh Yadav
- Edited by: Saravana-Iyyappan
- Music by: Sabesh–Murali
- Production company: Jhabak Movies
- Release date: 14 August 2009
- Running time: 174 minutes
- Country: India
- Language: Tamil

Pokkisham (transl. Treasure) is a 2009 Indian Tamil language film directed by Cheran starring himself, Padmapriya, and Aryan Rajesh. The film failed at the box office, but Padmapriya won the Tamil Nadu State Film Award for Best Actress.

== Plot ==
In 1970, a marine engineer Lenin from Calcutta, comes across a Nagore girl Nadira. It started with friendship, later seeded with love, Lenin mails a letter once a month. When Lenin came to Nagore, he was disappointed and sad as Nadira and her family left the place after selling their home. Years later, Mahesh, son of Lenin, found his father's hidden life from reading his diary. With help from his friend Shamsudeen, he marches his way to find Nadira and delivers the letter to her. He learns that Nadira has moved to Malaysia after her marriage. He goes to Malaysia to meet her. Once he reaches her house, he is greeted by Nadira's son who welcomes him to the house. Nadira is now very old and asks Mahesh who he is and how he knows her. He replies saying he is Lenin's son and also informs her that his father died a few years earlier. Nadira is grief-stricken. Mahesh gives her Lenin's last few letters which he could not post because he did not have Nadira's address. In those letters, Lenin has spoken about his journey to find Nadira after she and her family shifted from Nagore. He describes his pain and grief over not knowing about her situation during those days, and also about his father who coaxed him to marry another girl, who is now his wife and is very understanding. Nadira then drops Mahesh at the airport and while on the way she request him to let her talk to his mother. Nadira and Mahesh's mother exchange good notes and then she finally drops him to the airport. While returning, she is talking to herself as well as to Lenin saying that she showed her anguish and punished her father by refusing to marry anyone. She currently lives with her sister and her lovable family and apologises and promises Lenin that she will join him soon and never separate.

== Cast ==
- Cheran as Lenin
- Padmapriya as Nadira (voiceover by Meena)
- Aryan Rajesh as Mahesh (voiceover by Prasanna)
- Vijayakumar
- Ilavarasu
- Anupama Kumar as Lenin's wife
- Ajai. R as Shamsudeen
- Bindu Madhavi as Anjali, Mahesh's girlfriend
- Misha Ghoshal as Nadira's sister

== Production ==
In early 2002, Cheran announced that he was going to make a film titled Pokkisham and Kanika would star alongside him. However he failed to find a financier and instead moved back to making Autograph (2004). Cheran then prepared to work on Pokkisham in 2004, after the release of Autograph but postponed the film after falling out with the new lead actress Meera Jasmine. He restarted work on the film in December 2005, after completing Thavamai Thavamirundhu (2005), and approached Sandhya to play the lead role.

== Soundtrack ==
The soundtrack album was composed by the duo Sabesh–Murali. Pavithra Srinivasan from Rediff.com rated the album two out of five and wrote that "Considering the romantic genre of the film, the composers have gone all out to produce heart-wrenching numbers with familiar tunes and a potpourri of oft-heard songs. Some of them are pleasing while others aren't. The overall effect strikes you as quite average".

Track listing
No.	Title	Lyrics	Singer(s)	Length
1.	"Aalagu Mugam"	Yugabharathi	V. V. Prassanna
2.	"Nila Nee Vaanam"	Yugabharathi	Chinmayi Sripaada, Vijay Yesudas
3.	"Anjal Petti"	Yugabharathi	Karthik
4.	"Aaj Monee"	Yugabharathi	Vijay Yesudas, Ujjaini
5.	"Ohh Ohh"	Yugabharathi	Vijay Yesudas
6.	"Varum Vazhi Engum"	Yugabharathi	Ranjani
7.	"Mudru Naal Aagume"	Yugabharathi	Karthik
8.	"Ulagam Ninaivil Illai"	Yugabharathi	Mahathi, V. V. Prassanna
9.	"Mozhi Illamalae"	Yugabharathi	Madhu Balakrishnan
10.	"Kanavu Sila Samayam"	Yugabharathi	V. V. Prassanna
11.	"Siru Punnagai"	Yugabharathi	V. V. Prassanna

== Critical reception ==
Bhama Devi Ravi from The Times of India wrote that "So many words and there is no let-up for nearly three hours. At the end of it all, you do not even empathise with the hero Cheran whose all-consuming love lasts over three decades". A critic from IANS wrote that "Pokkisham moves at a snail pace and is one of the drawbacks of the romance saga".
