= Karthika Adaikalam =

Indian actress

Karthika
- Born: Karthika Adaikalam; 3 May 1991 (age 35); Thirukadaiyur, Tamil Nadu, India
- Other name: 'Thoothukudi' Karthika
- Occupations: Actress, model
- Years active: 2006–present

Karthika Adaikalam (born 3 May 1991), better known mononymously as Karthika, is an Indian actress who has appeared in Tamil films. She is probably best known for her performances in Thoothukudi and Raman Thediya Seethai.

== Career ==
Karthika made her debut as an actress through Sanjay Ram's Thoothukudi, a village action drama, where she appeared opposite choreographer-turned-actor Harikumar. She was cast in the film after the makers had spotted her in a commercial. The relative success of the film prompted Karthika to be labelled as 'Thootukudi' Karthika or 'Karuvappaiya' Karthika by the media, after a popular song from the film. A song titled "Ulaga Azhagi" from her second film, Pirappu (2008) also won her recognition, despite the relative low-key release of the film. She was recognised by director Bala, who cast her in the leading female role of a bling beggar opposite Arya in Naan Kadavul (2009) during mid-2007. However, despite being completing a test shoot, where she was asked to beg in the streets of Periyakulam, Bala later dropped her from the project. Some of the other films she worked on during the period including Raghavan's Alaiyodu Vilaiyadu, Jawahar Pattalam and Machan also failed to have a theatrical release.

Karthika featured in Raman Thediya Seethai (2008) alongside an ensemble cast including Cheran, Pasupathy and Vimala Raman. She then signed on to appear in Madurai Sambavam (2009), once again appearing alongside Harikumar. Post-release, she revealed that she had accepted the brief role as a goodwill gesture to Harikumar, who had played a role in beginning her acting career.

Karthika took an extended break from the film industry after getting married in 2012. In mid-2019, Karthika announced plans of making a comeback to acting. She will next be seen in the fantasy film, Mayamukhi.

== Filmography ==
| Year | Film | Role | Notes |
|---|---|---|---|
| 2006 | Thoothukudi | Mallika | |
| 2007 | Pirappu | Padma Shankarapandi | |
| 2007 | Naalaiya Pozhuthum Unnodu | Nangai | |
| 2008 | Raman Thediya Seethai | Gayathri | |
| 2009 | Madurai Sambavam | Gomathi | |
| 2009 | Vaidehi | Vaidehi | |
| 2010 | Thairiyam | Jennifer | |
| 2010 | 365 Kadhal Kadithangal | Jasmine | |
| 2021 | Mayamukhi | | Filming |
