= Sadgamaya =

- Sadgamaya Movie poster
- Directed by: Hari Kumar
- Screenplay by: Shatrughnan
- Story by: Harikumar
- Produced by: M Nandhakumar
- Starring: Suresh Gopi; Navya Nair; Shweta Menon; Jagathy Sreekumar; Thilakan
- Edited by: B. Ajithkumar
- Music by: M. Jayachandran
- Release date: 28 October 2010
- Country: India
- Language: Malayalam

Sadgamaya is a 2010 Malayalam film directed by Hari Kumar, starring Suresh Gopi, Navya Nair and Shweta Menon in the lead roles.

== Plot ==
Yamuna who is preparing for wedding receives a letter from her psychiatrist Ravi Varman, who had treated her for schizophrenic disorder three years ago. Ravi Varman now wants to meet her, as she is soon to witness some critical circumstances. Ravi Varman, according to his unsatisfied wife Jyothi, is more like a mentally challenged person than most of his patients, treating only one patient at a time, that too in an alien hill bungalow. Though the mental issues and associated unsettling hallucinations faced by Yamuna are confusing, Ravi Varman finds the root causes of continuous 'vulture episodes' through his travels into her subconscious mind and starts his treatments, finally to get the girl disowned by even her parents.

== Cast ==
- Suresh Gopi as Dr. Ravi Varman
- Navya Nair as Yamuna
- Shweta Menon as Jyothi
- Jagathy Sreekumar as Unni Nedungadi
- Thilakan as P.K Menon
- P. Sreekumar as Yamuna's father
- Ambika as Yamuna's mother
- Lakshmi Priya as Yamuna's sister
- Shivaji Guruvayoor as Ramankutty

== Soundtrack ==
Sadgamaya

Soundtrack album by M. Jayachandran
- Released: October 2010
- Genre: Film soundtrack
- Length: 9:19
- Language: Malayalam

M. Jayachandran chronology
Four Friends (2010)	Sadgamaya (2010)	Oru Small Family (2010)

The music was composed by M. Jayachandran, with lyrics written by Rafeeq Ahamed.

Track listing
No.	Title	Lyrics	Music	Singer(s)	Length
1.	"Kaathirunnu Njan"	Rafeeq Ahamed	M. Jayachandran	K. S. Chithra	4:38
2.	"Oru Pooviniyum"	Rafeeq Ahamed	M. Jayachandran	K. J. Yesudas	4:41
Total length:					9:19
