= Malavika (actress) =

Indian actress (born 1979)

- Born: Shweta Konnur Menon; 19 July 1979 (age 47); Bangalore, Karnataka, India
- Occupation: Actress
- Years active: 1999–2009; 2026–present
- Spouse: Sumesh Menon (m. 2007)
- Children: 2

Shweta Konnur Menon (born 19 July 1979), known by her stage name Malavika, is an Indian actress who predominantly appears in Tamil films and a few Telugu, Kannada and Malayalam films in the late 90s and early 2000s.

== Personal life ==
Malavika's birth name is Shweta Konnur. She was born to Aishwarya and Brigadier Jayvibhav Konnur in Bengaluru.

== Career ==
Malavika shot to fame at the age of 19, with her debut in the 1999 Tamil movie Unnai Thedi with Ajith Kumar directed by Sundar C. The film went on to become a major blockbuster. She again was cast alongside Ajith in the film Anandha Poongatre. She showed her acting skills in the film Rojavanam, which established her as an actress and left her with three hits from three films. However, the film Pooparika Varugirom flopped, although the cast included Sivaji Ganesan.

From 2000 to 2003 all her film did not perform well at the box office except Vetri Kodi Kattu and Seenu. After that her career took off as she returned with Suriya in Perazhagan in a song. In 2004, she starred alongside Kamal Haasan in Vasool Raja MBBS. She was cast in the film Chandramukhi (2005). Later in that year, she ventured into Bollywood again and acted in C U at 9. She gave her best performance in the Tamil film Thiruttu Payale in 2006. She was also a part of Mani Ratnam's stage show, Netru Indru Naalai. In 2007, she appeared in supporting roles such as Vyapari, Thirumagan, Sabari, Manikanda and Naan Avanillai. Since then, she has mostly seen in guest appearance roles in Kuruvi (2008), Aayudham Seivom (2008) and Aarupadai (2009).

== Filmography ==
| Year | Film | Role | Language | Notes |
|---|---|---|---|---|
| 1999 | Unnai Thedi | Malavika | Tamil | Debut film |
| 1999 | Anandha Poongatre | Divya | Tamil | |
| 1999 | Rojavanam | Sindhu | Tamil | |
| 1999 | Pooparika Varugirom | Priya | Tamil | |
| 1999 | Chora Chittha Chora | Lalitha | Kannada | |
| 2000 | Chala Bagundi | Seetha | Telugu | |
| 2000 | Vetri Kodi Kattu | Amudha | Tamil | |
| 2000 | Seenu | Geetha | Tamil | |
| 2001 | Deevinchandi | Swetha | Telugu | |
| 2001 | Subhakaryam | | Telugu | |
| 2001 | Navvuthu Bathakalira | Dr Sandhya | Telugu | |
| 2001 | Lovely | Nivedha Mahadevan | Tamil | |
| 2002 | Priya Nestama | Pooja | Telugu | |
| 2002 | Phantom Pailey | Sathi | Malayalam | |
| 2003 | Darna Mana Hai | Neha | Hindi | |
| 2003 | Neenandre Ishta | Sneha | Kannada | |
| 2004 | Perazhagan | Dream bride | Tamil | Guest appearance |
| 2004 | Vasool Raja MBBS | Priya | Tamil | |
| 2004 | Apparao Driving School | Mahalakshmi | Telugu | |
| 2005 | Ayya | Chelladurai's ex-fiancée | Tamil | |
| 2005 | Chandramukhi | Priya | Tamil | |
| 2005 | Naina | Khemi | Hindi | |
| 2005 | C U at 9 | Kim / Juliet | Hindi | |
| 2006 | Pasa Kiligal | Priya | Tamil | |
| 2006 | Chithiram Pesuthadi | | Tamil | Guest appearance |
| 2006 | Thiruttu Payale | Roopini | Tamil | |
| 2006 | Kaivantha Kalai | | Tamil | Guest appearance |
| 2007 | Vyapari | Model | Tamil | |
| 2007 | Thirumagan | Myna | Tamil | |
| 2007 | Sabari | Doctoral student | Tamil | |
| 2007 | Manikanda | | Tamil | |
| 2007 | Maya Kannadi | Herself | Tamil | Guest appearance |
| 2007 | Naan Avanillai | Rekha Vignesh | Tamil | |
| 2007 | Arputha Theevu | Kanaka | Tamil | Guest appearance; partially reshot version of Malayalam film |
| 2007 | Machakaaran | Herself | Tamil | Guest appearance |
| 2008 | Singakutty | Herself | Tamil | Guest appearance |
| 2008 | Kattuviriyan | DC Meena, Sathyalakshmi | Tamil | Dual roles |
| 2008 | Kuruvi | Herself | Tamil | Guest appearances |
| 2008 | Aayudham Seivom | Herself | Tamil | Guest appearances |
| 2009 | Aarupadai | Herself | Tamil | Guest appearances |
| 2026 | Love Insurance Kompany | Vaala Meen | Tamil | |
