= Desiya Geetham =

1999 film directed by Cheran

- Poster
- Directed by: Cheran
- Written by: Cheran
- Produced by: Dharam Chand Lunked
- Starring: Murali; Rambha
- Cinematography: Priyan
- Edited by: K. Thangichalam
- Music by: Ilaiyaraaja
- Production company: Taras Creations
- Release date: 19 October 1998
- Running time: 164 minutes
- Country: India
- Language: Tamil

Desiya Geetham (/ðeɪsiˌjəˈɡiːðəm/ transl. National Anthem) is a 1998 Indian Tamil-language political drama film written and directed by Cheran. The film, co-produced by R. Chandru, Abuthahir, Sathish Kumar and G. V. Suresh Kumar, stars Murali and Rambha. It revolves around a group of people kidnapping a chief minister and bringing him to their village to make him understand the hardships of village life. The film was released on 19 October 1998, during Diwali. At the 46th Filmfare Awards South, Cheran won the award for Best Director – Tamil.

== Plot ==
The film is about a chief minister and his family being kidnapped by a group of people and taken to a remote village making them undergo the hardships of village life to learn about it.

== Cast ==
- Murali as Pandian
- Rambha as Mayil
- Vijayakumar
- Nagesh
- Nassar as Chief Minister Chinna Mariappan
- Manivannan as Indian
- Ranjith as Ganga
- Vijayasarathy
- Andavar
- Anandaraj
- Rajeswari (Padmashri) as Kaveri
- Sathyapriya as Guru Amma
- Nalinikanth
- Scissor Manohar as Rathnam
- Crane Manohar
- Master Hari
- Nirmala Periyasamy
- P. Shwetha as cameo appearance in song "En Kanavinai"

== Soundtrack ==
The music was composed by Ilaiyaraaja. Reviewing the album, Sajahan Waheed of New Straits Times gave it 4 stars out of 5.

Song	Singers	Lyrics
"Ladies Special"	Sujatha	Palani Bharathi
"En Kanavinai"	Hariharan	Vaasan
"Desiya Geetham"	K. J. Yesudas	Arivumathi
"Naan Vaakkapattu"	Sujatha	Palani Bharathi
"Mannana Poranthavuga"	Pushpavanam Kuppusamy	Vaasan
"Appan Veettu"	Pushpavanam Kuppusamy	Vaasan
"Nanba Nanba"	Ilaiyaraaja	Vaasan
"Anal Gandhi"	Ilaiyaraaja	Vaasan

== Critical reception ==
A critic from Dinakaran noted "Cheran has won in highlighting minutely and emotively the village maladies and it's disastrous shortcomings". Kala Krishnan-Ramesh from Deccan Herald noted "This film has a message, which is meant for all of us, “Before the last Indian goes mad, let’s do something". D. S. Ramanujam of The Hindu wrote, "A thought-provoking movie on the plight of the villagers denied basic necessities like water, roads, hospitals and consumable rice at the FP shops, has been brought out with a lot of thrust by director Cheran".

== Controversy ==
The film elicited controversy from politicians because of its plot involving a chief minister's kidnapping. M. Karunanidhi, then the Chief Minister of Tamil Nadu, was reportedly displeased by the same. Cheran, who claimed his intentions were not to hurt anyone, invited Karunanidhi to watch the film and decide, but he refused. However, politician G. K. Moopanar lauded the film for Cheran's work, and actor Rajinikanth, who supported the alliance of Karunanidhi's party Dravida Munnetra Kazhagam (DMK) and Moopanar's Tamil Maanila Congress (TMC) in the 1996 Tamil Nadu Legislative Assembly (which TMC won), said Cheran brought out whatever messages he (Rajinikanth) would have liked to deliver.
