= Raman Thediya Seethai (2008 film) =

- Theatrical release poster
- Directed by: K. P. Jagan
- Written by: K. P. Jagan
- Produced by: Moser Baer Entertainment
- Starring: Cheran; Pasupathy; Nithin Sathya; Vimala Raman; Remya Nambeeshan; Gajala; Karthika; Navya Nair; Manivannan
- Cinematography: Rajesh Yadav
- Edited by: Kola Bhaskar
- Music by: Vidyasagar
- Release date: 19 September 2008
- Running time: 145 minutes
- Country: India
- Language: Tamil

Raman Thediya Seethai (transl. The Sita that Rama sought) is a 2008 Indian Tamil-language drama film written and directed by K. P. Jagan. The film features an ensemble cast including Cheran, Pasupathy, Nithin Sathya, Vimala Raman, Remya Nambeeshan, Gajala, Navya Nair, and Karthika. The music was composed by Vidyasagar with cinematography by Rajesh Yadav and editing by Kola Bhaskar. The film released on 19 September 2008 to positive response and turned out as a success.

In 2012, the film was remade in Kannada as Gowri Putra with Akshay.

== Plot ==
Venugopal is an entrepreneur and an aging bachelor in pursuit of arranged marriage matches. Though kindhearted, he has mental health issues due to which he also stammers under stress. When looking for matches, Venu insists on being transparent about his condition, due to which he is rejected by a potential match, Ranjitha, who respects his honesty but finds his condition alarming. Venu's mother arranges for him to meet another girl named Vidhya, who agrees to marry him. At their wedding, however, Vidhya's father Manikkavel informs Venu that she had eloped. To save her family from humiliation, Venu stops the wedding and takes the blame.

In the aftermath, Venu goes into depression and almost gets into a road accident, but is saved by Nedumaran, a blind radio jockey. Venu acquaints with Nedumaran's family, and learns from his wife, Thamizhisai, that they met through Nedumaran's motivational radio show. Infatuated by his joyful and positive attitude despite his condition, she sought after Nedumaran and proposed to him, who initially rejected her out of fear of disappointing her family. Smitten by her charm, however, he later spoke to Thamizhisai's family and they agreed to their marriage. Inspired by their story and spirit, Venu starts to move on.

Grateful to Venu and his mother, Manikkavel offers to find him a suitable match and introduces him to Gayathri in Nagercoil. Gayathri reassures Venu about his health and they start courting. In the meantime, Venu meets a thief turned rickshaw driver Gunasekhar alias Guna and is intrigued by him. Upon inquiring him, Guna explains to Venu that he met Gayathri in a home he broke into and fell for her, but she refused to reciprocate his feelings due to his scurvy lifestyle. Guna set out to win her heart by reforming himself and at one point even managed to win a local race, only to be rejected again. He remained an honest man hoping that Gayathri will one day love him back. Upon learning this, Venu confronts Gayathri, who confesses that she too was moved by Guna but felt afraid to face her family. Venu encourages her to be with Guna and withdraws from the arranged proposal.

While in Nagercoil, Venu runs into Vidhya, finding her in distress and poverty. Vidhya explains that she eloped with her ex, Ramesh, due to his blackmail of suicide and was pressured into marry him. Soon after, however, Ramesh went to jail after blinding their neighbor for peeping on a showering Vidhya, and left her pregnant and fending for herself. Venu takes pity on Vidhya and takes her to a hospital. While there, he finds Ranjitha working there as a cashier, much to his surprise, and befriends her. After Vidhya goes into labor, Venu pleads with Manikkavel to help her. A furious Manikkavel, however, angrily berates Venu at the hospital and refuses to help. Venu lashes out at Manikkavel and chides him for failing to forgive his daughter in her time of need. Manikkavel relents and reconciles with Vidhya, taking her and her child home with him.

Witnessing Venu's benevolence and compassion, Ranjitha develops feelings for him. Before she can profess to him, however, Venu shares his enthusiasm about another arranged proposal to Ranjitha, leaving her heartbroken. After an attempted visit to his potential match goes awry, Ranjitha tends to his injuries and tearfully confides in him about her feelings. In response, Venu calls his mother and informs her of his decision to marry Ranjitha, to everyone's delight.

== Cast ==
- Cheran as Venugopal
- Pasupathy as Nedumaran
- Nithin Sathya as Gunasekhar
- Vimala Raman as Ranjitha
- Remya Nambeeshan as Vidhya Manikkavel
- Gajala as Thamizhisai Nedumaran
- Karthika as Gayathri
- Navya Nair as Senthamarai, Inspector of Police
- Manivannan as Manikkavel
- Karunas as Murali
- Vidharth as Ramesh (Vidhya's husband)

== Production ==
=== Casting ===
The film was announced in 2007, and the photo session was held at the time of launch. Gajala was selected as one of the leads. Kerala-based Remya Nambeesan was selected, and she joined in second schedule. Vimala Raman of Poi, Karthika of Thoothukudi, and Navya Nair were selected since the story needed five heroines. Pasupathy and Nithin Sathya were selected to play important roles.

=== Filming ===
Director Jagan said that "There are 78 scenes whereas there are 94 locations in the film" and added that "in most of the scenes there would be a small flashback and if this is taken into consideration then there are more locations in the film rather than scenes".

Most of the shooting spot are in Kanyakumari district,...Noorul Islam University, Kanyakumari beech, Boothapandi, Manimedai location..

== Controversy ==
The unit was highly criticized, when it had used the vehicle registration number of a revenue department officer without obtaining proper permissions. A complaint was filed with the police against director Cheran; however, no official complaint was later lodged.

In January 2008, the shooting of the film was in progress at Boothapandi in Kanyakumari district. During the shooting, 12 vehicles were involved, which were going to parade for a minister in the scene. Hundreds of people were gathered to watch this shoot in the village. The last vehicle, which was the jeep, hit an old woman Kuttralammal and she was thrown afar. She was admitted in a hospital, where she died the next day.

The local inspector registered a case against the driver of the jeep and the director. Shooting was cancelled.

== Soundtrack ==
Raman Thediya Seethai

Soundtrack album by Vidyasagar
- Released: 4 September 2008
- Recorded: Varsha Vallaki Studios
- Genre: Feature film Soundtrack
- Length: 24:05
- Language: Tamil
- Label: Sony BMG
- Producer: Vidyasagar

Vidyasagar chronology
Alibhabha (2008)	Raman Thediya Seethai (2008)	Mahesh, Saranya Matrum Palar (2008)

The soundtrack is composed by Vidyasagar, and it was well received. Balu Mahendra and Bhagyaraj released the audio, which was held in Sathyam Cinemas on 30 July 2008. During the audio release, Cheran made controversial statements about reporters by publishing rumours about him.

Title	Singers	Lyrics
"Mazhai Nindra "	Kalyani Nair	Kabilan
"Dj Dj Disca Poodu"	Benny Dayal, Suchitra	P. Vijay
"Vanathai Vittuvittu"	Tippu	Yugabharathi
"Ippavae Ippavae"	Madhu Balakrishnan, Harini	Viveka
"Nanba Nanba "	Karthik	Jayantha
"Enne Pulla"	Vidyasagar	Jayantha

== Critical reception ==
Rediff wrote:"There's a delicate balance between portraying a genuinely touching story and going overboard with emotions. And that's where Global One Studio Productions' Raman Thediya Seethai (Rama's Hunt for Seetha), directed by K P Jagannath, manages to be different". Behindwoods wrote:"The director needs to be appreciated for delivering a film without kissing or glamorous scenes. However, he could have tried to make the subject a bit more interesting". Sify wrote:"RTS is riveting cinema and exhibits emotional depth and is a clean feel-good family entertainer". Nowrunning wrote:"Minus violence and item numbers, 'Raman Thediya Seethai,' a feel good romance certainly entertains".
