= 365 Kadhal Kadithangal =

2010 film by N. Pandian

- Directed by: N. Pandian
- Written by: N. Pandian
- Produced by: Salai Maitri
- Starring: Yuva Karthik; Ajay; Karthika
- Cinematography: Salai Sagadevan
- Edited by: V. A. Shanmugam
- Music by: Paul J. (songs); Jaiky (score)
- Production company: Vision 21 Creative Team Works
- Release date: 17 September 2010
- Running time: 125 minutes
- Country: India
- Language: Tamil

365 Kadhal Kadithangal (transl. 365 love letters) is a 2010 Indian Tamil language romantic drama film directed by N. Pandian. The film stars Yuva Karthik, Ajay and Karthika, with Karunas, Radha Ravi, Devan, Singamuthu, Bava Lakshmanan, Muthukaalai and Sampath Ram playing supporting roles. The film, produced by Salai Maitri, had musical score by Paul J. and was released on 17 September 2010.

== Plot ==
The film begins with Subbu (Ajay) killing Suruli (Sampath Ram) in Kodaikanal and starting to remember his past.

In 1992, Subbu (Yuva Karthik) was a carefree secondary school student who lived with his strict father and sawmill labourer Rasu Thevar (Radha Ravi). Jasmine (Karthika), who came from Madras, joined his school and became his classmate. Her father Williams (Devan) was a wealthy businessman. Subbu fell in love with Jasmine at first sight and tried to woo her, but she did not reciprocate his love and instead preferred to be friends with him. Jasmine even helped Subbu pass his plus two exam. At the close of the school year, Jasmine returned to Madras with her parents.

Back to the present, doctors have given up their hopes on Jasmine, who is now a comatose patient. Her parents are left with no options other than mercy-killing her, but Subbu believes that he can bring her back to normalcy, and he takes her with him.

In 1992, Rasu Thevar died after a workplace accident, and Subbu ended up without money. Subbu decided not to go to college, and he got his father's job. One day, Subbu found Jasmine's letter stating the address of her new home, and he wrote love letters to his sweetheart every day for a year. In the meantime, Jasmine joined a college in Madras, and Subbu's love letters were intercepted by her mother Elizabeth (Usha Elizabeth). Six years later, Jasmine, who had a decent, well-paying job, returned to Kodaikanal for her holidays and found out about Subbu's love letters. Jasmine was shocked that Subbu was still in love with her, and she advised him to forget her. In the meantime, Suruli, who was Subbu's enemy, hit Jasmine with his car, and she fell into a coma.

Back to the present, Williams lodges a complaint against Subbu for taking Jasmine with him, and the court orders Subbu to leave her to Williams. When Williams takes her home from him, Subbu shoots himself, and Jasmine finally wakes up.

== Cast ==
- Yuva Karthik as Teenager Subbu
- Ajay as Adult Subbu
- Karthika as Jasmine
- Karunas as Murugan
- Radha Ravi as Rasu Thevar
- Devan as Williams
- Singamuthu as Sawmill owner
- Bava Lakshmanan as Head constable
- Muthukaalai as Mental
- Sampath Ram as Suruli
- Devendran as Oomai
- Boys Rajan as Doctor
- V. M. Subburaj
- Vijay Ganesh
- Regi
- Usha Elizabeth as Elizabeth
- Minnal Deepa as Gomathi

== Production ==
N. Pandian who had directed the film Priyam (1996) returned with 365 Kadhal Kadithangal under the banner of Vision 21 Creative Team Works. The major portions were shot in Ooty and Kotagiri.

== Soundtrack ==
365 Kadhal Kadithangal

Soundtrack album by Paul J.
- Released: 13 December 2009
- Recorded: 2009
- Genre: Feature film soundtrack
- Length: 23:59
- Label: Mass Audios
- Producer: Paul J.

Paul J. chronology
Rajadhi Raja (2009)	365 Kadhal Kadithangal (2009)	Kathai (2010)

The soundtrack was composed by Paul J. The soundtrack features 6 tracks and it was released on 13 December 2009 by T. Rajendar with Silambarasan receiving it.

All lyrics are written by Youreka.

Tracklist
No.	Title	Singer(s)	Length
1.	"Cycle Devadhai"	Veeramani	4:17
2.	"Alapara"	MK Balaji, Veeramani, Jyotish	4:12
3.	"Kaadhal Kuruvi"	Veeramani, Mirnalini, Sunandita Nair	3:28
4.	"Lavender Pennae"	MK Balaji, Vinaita Sivakumar	4:08
5.	"Mudhal Mazhai"	Padmalatha, Veeramani	4:50
6.	"Kaadhal Kuruvi"	Veeramani	3:04
Total length:			23:59
