= Anantha Poongatre =

- Poster
- Directed by: Raj Kapoor
- Written by: Shivaram Gandhi (dialogues)
- Screenplay by: Raj Kapoor
- Story by: Raj Kapoor
- Produced by: M. Kaja Mydeen
- Starring: Ajith Kumar; Meena; Malavika
- Cinematography: Priyan
- Edited by: B. Lenin; V. T. Vijayan
- Music by: Deva
- Production company: Roja Combines
- Release date: 27 May 1999
- Running time: 154 minutes
- Country: India
- Language: Tamil

Anantha Poongatre (transl. Breeze of happiness) is a 1999 Indian Tamil-language romantic drama film written and directed by Raj Kapoor. The film stars Ajith Kumar and Meena in the lead roles, with Malavika in a supporting role and Karthik in a guest appearance. The film is based upon how respect can be mistaken as love by circumstances.

Anantha Poongatre was released on 27 May 1999. It received positive reviews and became a commercial success. It won the Tamil Nadu State Film Award for Best Dialogue Writer and Tamil Nadu State Film Award for Best Film Portraying Woman in Good Light. The film was remade in Telugu as Subhakaryam (2001) and later in Kannada as Rajakumari (2009).

== Plot ==
Meenatchi is a widow living with her son, Nandu. Jeeva, who lives in the same colony, has been pining silently for her for the last four years. He runs an organization called A-to-Z, which can get anything done for anybody.

Jeeva follows Divya to get some information on her for her suitor but, she ends up falling for him and pursues him relentlessly. He avoids her, telling her that he is already in love with someone else, and when cornered, reveals that it is Meenatchi.

This leads to some surprising revelations about Meenatchi's past. The flashback is revealed. Meenatchi is a music student of Haridas. Haridas has a child, Nandu, whose mother, Banu, died giving birth to him. Their mutual respect is mistaken for romance by her father, Dharmalingam, who is a zamindar, and Haridas is killed in the fracas. Later, Meenatchi vows to live like a widow, taking care of Haridas's child. However, that very day, Jeeva and his parents were about to see Meenatchi as a prospective bride. When Jeeva sees this scene unfold before his eyes, he starts admiring her courage. Despite his parents' protests, he assures Meenatchi's father that he would make her change her mind and that he would marry her. But Meenatchi's world turns upside down when Divya's father, a staunch supporter of love marriage, kidnaps Nandu and asks Jeeva to marry Divya. Jeeva of course accepts and things are then resolved in the climax.

== Cast ==
- Ajith Kumar as Jeeva
- Meena as Meenatchi
- Malavika as Divya
- Manivannan as Zamindar Rajadurai
- Vadivelu as Subramani, Jeeva's friend
- Chaplin Balu as Jeeva's friend
- Vijayakumar as Zamindar Dharmalingam, Meenatchi's father
- Raj Kapoor as Ranjith, Divya's uncle (director)
- Rajan P. Dev as Shanmugam, Divya's father
- Kovai Sarala as Saradha, Rajadurai's wife
- C. R. Saraswathi as Colony neighbour
- Crane Manohar
- Bala Singh as Viswam
- Manobala as Poongavanam
- Madhan Bob as Advocate Krishnan
- Mayilsamy as Mani, Jeeva's friend
- Ambika as Janaki
- Karthik as Haridas (guest appearance)
- Bhanupriya as Bhanu, Haridas's wife (guest appearance)
- Raju Sundaram cameo in song "Meenatchi Meenatchi"
- Paari Venkat as Jeeva’s friend
- Japan Kumar (special appearance in the song "Udhayam Theatre")

== Production ==
Filming of Anantha Poongatre began in early January 1999, shortly after Ajith Kumar completed shooting for his previous psychological thriller, Vaalee, which was released in the end of April 1999, and was completed in early May 1999, within a span of four months. Ajith grew thin beard for his role as Jeeva in this movie. During production, the producer M. Kajamydeen had attempted unsuccessfully to oust Ajith from the project and replace him with Prashanth. Initially Vindhya was assigned to play Malavika's role in the film, but due to her commitment to Sangamam, she was later dropped from the project. Sathyaraj was reported to play a cameo where he would appear in two scenes after the interval, this proved untrue.

== Soundtrack ==
The music was composed by Deva.

Track listing
No.	Title	Lyrics	Singer(s)	Length
1.	"Vaikasi"	Vairamuthu	Hariharan	01:29
2.	"Akka Akka"	Vairamuthu	Srinivas, Swarnalatha	04:35
3.	"Meenatchi Meenatchi"	Ponniyin Selvan	Deva, Sabesh	05:03
4.	"Paatukku Palaivanam"	Vairamuthu	Hariharan, Krishnaraj	05:41
5.	"Semmeena Vinmeena"	Vairamuthu	Hariharan	05:28
6.	"Solaikuyil"	Vairamuthu	Hariharan, Sujatha	05:16
7.	"Udhayam Theatre"	Vairamuthu	Deva, Sabesh	04:49
Total length:				32:21

== Release and reception ==
The film was released on 27 May 1999. It won two Tamil Nadu State Awards with the Tamil Nadu State Film Award for Best Dialogue Writer going to Shivaram Gandhi while it also won the Tamil Nadu State Film Award for Best Film Portraying Woman in Good Light. The film was remade in Telugu as Subhakaryam and later in Kannada as Rajakumari.

== Critical reception ==
K. N. Vijiyan of New Straits Times, writes "Generally go for this movie if you are an Ajith, Karthik or Meena fan. It has star value and good comedy". K. P. S. of Kalki praised Raj Kapoor's screenplay, performances of Ajith and Karthik and Deva's music but felt Meena and Malavika came and went and concluded saying due to routine plot and sentiments could not enjoy happiness in this breeze of happiness. D. S. Ramanujam of The Hindu wrote, "The triangle love tale takes enjoyable proportions thanks to the good handling of the plot by director Raj Kapoor", also appreciating the cinematography and dialogues.
