= Vetri Kodi Kattu =

- Poster
- Directed by: Cheran
- Written by: Cheran
- Produced by: Sivasakthi Pandian
- Starring: Murali; Parthiban; Meena; Malavika
- Cinematography: Priyan
- Edited by: B. Lenin; V. T. Vijayan
- Music by: Deva
- Production company: Sivasakthi Movie Makers
- Release date: 30 June 2000
- Running time: 168 minutes
- Country: India
- Language: Tamil

Vetri Kodi Kattu (transl. Raise the flag of victory) is a 2000 Indian Tamil-language drama film written and directed by Cheran. The film stars Murali, Parthiban, Meena, and Malavika, while Vadivelu, Manorama, Anandaraj, Vijayakumar, and Charle play supporting roles. It was released on 30 June 2000 and won the National Film Award for Best Film on Other Social Issues, in addition to three Tamil Nadu State Film Awards including Third Best Film and Best Dialogue Writer. The film's title is based on a song from Padayappa (1999).

== Plot ==
Sekhar lives in a village near Tenkasi with his mother Deivanai and two sisters. A drought hits their village, his elder sister's husband sends her home to get back her due dowry amount, and Sekar's agriculture does not prove to be profitable, which prompts Sekhar to grab the opportunity to leave for Dubai, United Arab Emirates. Despite being a graduate, he sells a portion of his land and gives Rs.1 lakh to Kasimanikkam, who manages a firm arranging work visas for people and enabling them to migrate to Dubai for manual labour.

Muthuraman lives in a village near Coimbatore. Despite being a graduate, he works for the village landlord as accountant. He falls in love with the landlord's only daughter Valli, and the couple get married without the landlord's consent. Valli challenges her father that she will lead a good life with Muthu. To earn money, Muthu also enrolls with Kasimanikkam's firm to go to Dubai. Kasimanikkam takes all the people enrolled with him to Chennai, and the flight is scheduled to leave the next day. To everyone's shock, Kasimanikkam runs away the same night with all the money he has collected from the intending migrants. The police informs them that Kasimanikkam is a fraud involved in looting money.

Everyone leaves the place with much disappointment except Sekhar and Muthu as they are scared much thinking of the consequences to their families if they get to know about the loss of money. They clearly guess that their respective families will have to commit suicide out of shame and loss. Sekhar and Muthu get to know about each other's family situation and come up with a plan. Sekhar goes to Muthu's home and vice versa. Sekhar introduces himself as Muthu's orphan friend who has returned from Dubai. Similarly, Muthu introduces to Sekhar's family as Sekhar's friend from Dubai.

Muthu understands that though the soil in Sekhar's land is not fit for agriculture, it can be used for grazing of cows, so he decides to buy a couple of cows with the help of Sudalaimuthu and starts a milk business. Meanwhile, Sekhar starts a small restaurant business, as Valli cooks very well. Muthu's sister Amudha falls in love with Sekhar, but he does not reciprocate, thinking that it would be betraying Muthu's trust. Both the family situations improve, and within 8 months, Valli-Sekhar duo rent a building in City for their restaurant. Valli feels proud that she has won the challenge against her father.

On the day of restaurant opening, Valli gets furious knowing about Amudha's love towards Sekhar and asks him to leave home. Sekhar stays in a place opposite Valli's home. That night, Valli, who was already pregnant, suffers the pains of labour. Sekhar admits her in a hospital, informs Muthu about the situation, and asks him to come immediately. Deivanai overhears Muthu's telephone conversation with Sekhar and understands that her son is not in Dubai, as believed by everyone. Muthu apologizes to Deivanai, and everyone leaves to his village to visit Valli, where she gives birth to a baby girl. Everyone learns of Muthu and Sekhar's plans, and they feel proud about their sacrifice for the well-being of their family members.

Pazhani, who is also cheated by Kasimanikkam, finds him in Coimbatore under another name and running another fake agency and informs Muthu and Sekhar. Now, Muthu and Sekhar rush to place and badly thrash Kasimanikkam and his men for looting the hard-earned money from the poor. Kasimanikkam is handed over to the police, and the Police Commissioner who had reprimanded them for losing their money to Kasimanikkam in Chennai and is now posted in Coimbatore assures everyone that the money lost will be recovered. Meanwhile, Muthu and Sekhar make the others realize that there are plenty of opportunities available in India to earn money, and instead there is no need to leave to another country to make money leaving all the relatives and family members back there, and the Police Commissioner praises them for their views. Muthu and Sekhar reconcile with their families at the Commissioner's office, and go to Muthu's village for lunch. There Muthu and Valli openly agree to get Amudha married to Sekhar.

== Cast ==
- Murali as Sekhar
- Parthiban as Muthuraman
- Meena as Valli, Muthuraman's wife
- Malavika as Amudha, Muthuraman's younger sister & Sekhar's love interest
- Manorama as Deivanai, Sekhar's mother
- Vadivelu as Sudalaimuthu
- Vijayakumar as Ramanathan, Valli's father
- Vinu Chakravarthy as Chakravarthy, Muthuraman's father
- Anandaraj as Kasi Manikkam, Dubai Job Agency's Middleman
- Rajeev as Police commissioner Rajarathnam
- Ramesh Khanna as Cook Murugan, Sekhar's friend & Muthuraman's family well wisher
- Charle as Pazhani, Shekhar & Muthuraman's agency friend
- Sathyapriya as Meenatchi, Valli's mother
- Indhu as Gunavathi, Sekhar's younger sister
- Vaiyapuri as Mani, Murugan's cooking assistant
- Ilavarasu as Thangavelu, Sekhar's brother-in-law
- Balaji as Balaji, Murugan's cooking assistant
- Crane Manohar as Senthil, Murugan's cooking assistant
- Benjamin as Kanagamuthu, Sudalaimuthu's brother-in-law
- Nellai Siva as Valaiappan, Sudalaimuthu's relative uncle
- Bayilvan Ranganathan as Bus Ticket Collector
- Dhamu (Special appearance in the song "Sirippu Varudhu Sirippu Varudhu")
- Kovai Sarala (Special appearance in the song "Sirippu Varudhu Sirippu Varudhu")
- Pandu (Special appearance in the song "Sirippu Varudhu Sirippu Varudhu")

== Production ==
This film was Cheran's third and last combo with Murali, Meena and second with Parthiban. Thangar Bachan was replaced by Priyan as cinematographer. The shooting for the film was held at places like Gobichettipalayam, Dindigul and Palani among other places.

== Themes and influences ==
According to Sivasakthi Pandian, the film "lays stress on changing the present ideas in society. It has shown what our youth can achieve in our own country when the present trend is to leave the country in search of employment, as soon as one completes one's education".

== Soundtrack ==
The soundtrack was composed by Deva.

Song	Singers	Lyrics	Length
Karupputhan Enakku	Anuradha Sriram	Pa. Vijay	05:49
Latcha Latchama	Shankar Mahadevan	Ra. Ravishankar	05:35
Siruppu Varudhu	Deva	Deva	04:55
Thillele Thillele	Krishnaraj, Shankar Mahadevan	Vairamuthu	05:31
Valli Valli	Mano, K. S. Chithra	Kalaikumar	05:38

== Critical reception ==
Malathi Ranagarajan from The Hindu wrote, "The director, in his eagerness to drive home his message, makes certain scenes so pedantic that they tire one after a point." Malini Mannath from Chennai Online wrote, "'Vettrikkodi Kattu' is a well-intentioned film and fairly entertaining too. It may not be as neatly scripted and as good as Cheran's first two films. But it proves that he is on the right track". Krishna Chidambaram of Kalki praised the acting of Parthiban, Manorama and Charlie while also praising Vadivelu's humour. K. N. Vijiyan of New Straits Times wrote, "Generally, the strong story, the Parthipan-Vadivelu comedy and star value stand this movie in good stead. Go see it".

== Accolades ==
The film won the National Film Award for Best Film on Other Social Issues, and three Tamil Nadu State Film Awards: Third Best Film, Best Dialogue Writer (Cheran) and Best Comedian (Vadivelu).
