= Crane Manohar =

Indian actor

- Born: 4 October 1965 (age 61); Madras, Tamil Nadu, India
- Occupation: Actor
- Years active: 1993–present

Crane Manohar (born 4 October 1965) is an Indian actor who appears in Tamil films, mostly in comedy roles. He appeared in many Vadivelu and Vivek comedy tracks.

== Career ==
Manohar initially worked as a crane technician for films and when he started acting he kept the name 'Crane' Manohar. He worked as a crane technician for Putham Pudhu Payanam (1991), Bharathi Kannamma (1997) and Porkkaalam (1997) as well as several Malayalam films. He started his career by acting in several K. S. Ravikumar, Hari, Suraj, Sundar C and Cheran films before playing supporting comedic roles in many films, often with Vadivelu. He garnered praise from critics for his roles in films including Kannukku Kannaga (2000) and Thenali (2000).

Manohar had roles in Udhaya (2004), Veeranna (2005), Satham Podathey (2007), Padikkadavan (2009), Velayudham (2011), Neram (2013), Bramman (2014), Katham Katham (2015) and Kamara Kattu (2015). He debuted as a character artiste in Irandu Manam Vendum (2016).

== Filmography ==
Year	Film	Role	Notes
1993	Meleparambil Aanveedu	Lorry driver	Malayalam film
1994	Nattamai	Mani	Uncredited
1995	Muthu Kulikka Vaarieyala		Uncredited
1995	Muthu	Kerala tea shop employee	Uncredited
1995	Periya Kudumbam	Beggar	
1996	Avvai Shanmugi	Vegetable buyer	Uncredited
1997	Dharma Chakkaram	Broker	
1997	Bharathi Kannamma	Senthil	
1997	Pistha	House guest	
1997	Porkkaalam		
1998	Natpukkaga	Village farmer	
1998	Poonthottam		
1998	Sollamale	Hairdresser	
1998	Desiya Geetham		
1998	Pudhumai Pithan	'Super' Suruli's sidekick	
1999	Kallazhagar		
1999	Suyamvaram	Pandi's friend	
1999	Ponvizha		
1999	Nee Varuvai Ena	Maarisamy	
1999	Minsara Kanna	Police constable	
1999	Unakkaga Ellam Unakkaga	Dumb person	
1999	Kannupada Poguthaiya	Kathavarayan	
1999	Paattali	Senthil	
2000	Vallarasu	Jewellery shop owner	
2000	Kannukku Kannaga		
2000	Magalirkkaga	Azhagurasa	
2000	Veeranadai		
2000	Appu	Tea stall owner	
2000	Vetri Kodi Kattu	Shekhar's friend	
2000	Pennin Manathai Thottu	Pickpocket	
2000	Thenali	Servant	
2000	Seenu	Groom	
2000	Ennavalle		
2001	Friends	Nesamani's worker	
2001	Dheena	Bus conductor	
2001	Engalukkum Kaalam Varum	Jennifer's relative	
2001	Rishi	Delhi	
2001	Ninaikkatha Naalillai	Office waiter	
2001	Dhill		
2001	Samudhiram		
2001	Love Channel	Aanazhagan	
2001	12B	Bus conductor	
2002	H2O	Chennoor villager	Kannada film; uncredited
2002	Thamizh		
2002	Baba	Kathrika (Baba's friend)	
2002	Maaran		
2002	Villain	Shiva's accomplice	
2002	Ramanaa		
2003	Pavalakkodi		
2003	Sena		
2003	Saamy	Vegetable Seller in Market	
2003	Paarai	Seller	
2003	Aahaa Ethanai Azhagu		
2003	Diwan		
2003	Winner	Kaipulla's henchman	
2003	Anjaneya	Protester	
2003	Iyarkai	Magician	
2004	Aethirree	Marriage Hall Watchman	
2004	Vayasu Pasanga		
2004	Varnajalam	Drunkard	
2004	Udhaya	Saamiyar (Priest)	
2004	Chellamae		
2004	Attahasam	Driving school staff	
2004	Jananam		
2004	Aai	Customer	
2005	Ambuttu Imbuttu Embuttu	Pazhani	Dual role
2005	Ayyaa	Karasingham's sidekick	
2005	Devathaiyai Kanden	Babu's foster brother	
2005	Pesuvoma		
2005	ABCD	Priest	
2005	Bambara Kannaley		
2005	Aaru	Lingam	
2005	Veeranna		
2006	Theenda Theenda	Puli Moottai	
2006	Kusthi		
2006	Rendu	Man who irritates Kirikalan at temple	
2006	Varalaru	Asylum patient	
2006	Vanjagan		
2006	Ilakkanam	Arumugam	
2007	Aarya	Watchman	
2007	Parattai Engira Azhagu Sundaram		
2007	Piragu	Production manager	
2007	Thaamirabharani	Driver	
2007	Satham Podathey	Ramachandran	
2007	Maa Madurai	Thangavelu's neighbour	
2007	Marudhamalai		
2007	Vegam		
2007	Vel	Ayyakannu	
2007	Kaanal Neer		
2007	Maya Kannadi		
2008	Ezhuthiyatharadi	Natarajan	
2008	Yaaradi Nee Mohini	Villager	
2008	Aayudham Seivom	Museum Worker	
2008	Pattaya Kelappu	Mano	
2008	Theeyavan	Cotton candy seller	
2008	Silambattam	Napoleon	
2009	Innoruvan		
2009	Padikkadavan	Appa Rao	
2009	Ore Manasu		
2009	Kannukulle	Bus Passenger	
2009	Sirithal Rasipen	Goda Govindan	
2009	Jaganmohini		
2009	Karthik Anitha	Beggar	
2009	Vedappan	Aspiring director	
2009	Naalai Namadhe	Poochi	
2010	Theeradha Vilaiyattu Pillai	Ambulance driver	
2010	Kacheri Arambam	Deepavali's laborer	
2010	Aayirathil Oruvan	Muthu's Uncle	
2010	Singam	Pazhani	
2010	Thillalangadi	Drunkard	
2010	Nagaram Marupakkam	Pandi's assistant	
2011	Ayyan		
2011	Thalapulla		
2011	Sattapadi Kutram		
2011	Aanmai Thavarael	Cab Driver	
2011	Marudhavelu	Kathamuthu	
2011	Velayudham	Theatre Operator	
2012	Ajantha		
2012	Theni Mavattam		
2012	Kollaikaran		
2012	Pudhumugangal Thevai		
2013	Puthagam		
2013	Chandhamama	Auto driver	
2013	Kantha		
2013	Neram	Auto driver	
2013	Summa Nachunu Irukku		
2013	Pattathu Yaanai		
2013	Singam II	Pazhani	
2013	Vanakkam Chennai		
2014	Veeram	College Peon	
2014	Bramman		
2014	Nimirndhu Nil		
2014	Oru Kanniyum Moonu Kalavaanikalum	Vatti	
2014	Poriyaalan	Fraud	
2014	Azhagiya Pandipuram		
2014	Lingaa	Merchant's security guard	
2015	Katham Katham	Swami Doss	
2015	Vethu Vettu	Attachi Appakadai customer	
2015	Kamara Kattu		
2015	Aaranyam		
2015	Eetti	Tea Master	
2016	Irandu Manam Vendum		
2016	Miruthan	Marriage broker	
2016	Ennam Puthu Vannam		
2016	Ko 2	Yogeeswaran's party volunteer	
2016	Onbathilirundhu Pathuvarai		
2016	Vendru Varuvaan		
2016	Aasi		
2016	Andaman		
2017	Aangila Padam	Iruttu Pusari's assistant	
2017	Saaya		
2017	Singam 3	Pazhani	
2017	Naalu Aaru Anju		
2017	Kanavu Variyam		
2017	Namma Kadha		
2017	Azhagin Bommi		
2017	Guru Uchaththula Irukkaru		
2018	Manushanaa Nee		
2018	Inba Twinkle Lilly	Astrologer	
2018	Saamy 2	Aarusaamy's aide	
2018	Kalavani Mappillai		
2019	Kee	Cook	
2019	Charlie Chaplin 2	MLA	
2019	Ganesha Meendum Santhipom	Auto driver	
2019	Kazhugu 2		
2019	Capmaari	Census Officer	
2020	Thottu Vidum Thooram		
2020	Ponmagal Vandhal	Tea stall owner	
2020	Thatrom Thookrom	Murugan	
2021	Loka		
2021	Boom Boom Kaalai		
2022	Vidiyadha Iravondru Vendum		
2022	Idiot	Thambikottai	
2022	D Block	Bajji Kadai Chetta	
2023	Kodai	Vadivel's brother-in-law	
2023	Eppodhum Ava Nenaipu		
2023	Kick	Ad Council member	
2023	Va Varalam Va		
2023	Rajini Rasigan		
2023	Odavum Mudiyadhu Oliyavum Mudiyadhu	Drunkard	
2024	Park		
2024	Boat	Person in the camp	
2025	Iruppu	Security guard	
2025	Usurae	Raghava's father	
2025	Gift		
2026	Gilli Mappilai		
2026	Karuppu	Court clerk	
2026	Sandakari	Bovo	
