= Pirappu =

- Poster
- Directed by: L. V. Ilangovan
- Written by: L. V. Ilangovan
- Produced by: H. G. Pramila Ganesh
- Starring: Prabha; Karthika; Priya Mohan
- Cinematography: Shanky Mahendran
- Edited by: Srinivas P. Babu
- Music by: Bharadwaj
- Production company: SRM Film International
- Release date: 1 June 2007
- Running time: 130 minutes
- Country: India
- Language: Tamil

Pirappu (transl. Birth) is a 2007 Tamil language romantic drama film directed by L. V. Ilangovan. The film stars newcomer Prabha, Karthika and newcomer Priya Mohan, with Mahadevan, Saranya Ponvannan, Vijay Krishnaraj, Sulakshana, Shanmugarajan, Anjali Devi, Ganja Karuppu and George Maryan playing supporting roles. It was released on 1 June 2007.

== Plot ==
Marudhu and Kaliammal are a rich but childless couple. They adopt Kannan, a young man from a lower caste. However, Kannan feels depressed to leave his parents and little sister for his new family. Kannan, Marudhu and Kaliammal then leave their place for Kaliammal's native village.

In Kaliammal's village, some villagers start to talk ill about Kannan's caste. Kaliammal's brother Shankarapandi, a politician and caste fanatic, hates Kannan and fears that Kannan would receive his sister's inheritance. In the meantime, Shankarapandi's daughter Padma falls in love with Kannan, whereas Kannan and Meera fall in love with each other. Thinking that his daughter and Kannan were in love with each other, Shankarapandi now wants Kannan to be his son-in-law. When Shankarapandi visits their home for the engagement, Kannan refuses to marry her; thus Shankarapandi felt humiliated. Padma's suicide attempt makes the situation worse.

Shankarapandi has a bad name among his caste people. To win the local election, he needs their support, and only Marudhu can help him. However, Marudhu refuses to help him and hates his view about the caste system. Meanwhile, Kannan is sick of this situation and leaves his home without informing his adoptive parents. A few days later, Marudhu and Kaliammal go to Meera's home to bring Kannan home, but he was not there. That night, Marudhu and Kaliammal are killed in a car explosion. Meera witnesses it, but she is hit by a car.

When Kannan returns home to perform the last rites for his adoptive parents, Shankarapandi humiliates him and is hell bent on performing the rites, thus receiving his sister's inheritance. Meera, who was in the hospital, tells Padma about the whole incident and blames Shankarapandi for the murders. Padma then orders Kannan to punish her father. An angry Kannan beats Shankarapandi up and tells him that money and caste do not matter to him. Meera takes a burning stick and gives it to Padma (Meera symbolically sacrifices her love). Padma then cremates the dead bodies. The film ends with Kannan leaving the place in tears and Padma following him.

== Cast ==
- Prabha as Kannan
- Karthika as Padma
- Priya Mohan as Meera
- Mahadevan as Marudhu, Kannan's adoptive father
- Saranya Ponvannan as Kaliammal, Kannan's adoptive mother
- Vijay Krishnaraj as Subramaniam, Kannan's biological father
- Sulakshana as Mallika, Kannan's biological mother
- Shanmugarajan as Shankarapandi, Padma's father
- Anjali Devi as Shenbagam, Padma's mother
- Ganja Karuppu as Kotti
- George Maryan as Muthusamy
- Paramasivan as Paramu
- Shobhana as Selvi
- P. Raja
- Vanathi Kathir
- Dr. Somanathan
- Narayanan
- Rail Rangarajan
- Ganapathy
- Devika
- Savithri
- Divya
- Nanditha Jennifer in a special appearance

== Production ==
L.V. Ilangovan, who worked as an assistant to the directors such as Bala, K. Vijayan and Nassar, made his directorial debut with Pirappu. New face Prabha was chosen to play the hero while Karthika and another actress credited as Mayuka were selected to play to play the female lead roles. Actress Nanditha Jennifer signed to perform for a Kuthu song shot near Pollachi. Balu Mahendra's son Shanky Mahendran was chosen to handle the camera. While shooting for the song, "Ulaga Azhagi Naan Thaan", oil was completely applied on Karthika's face and shot in one take much to her dissatisfaction.

== Soundtrack ==
The music was composed by Bharadwaj. The audio was released on 18 January 2007 in Chennai. The song "Ulaga Azhagi Naan Thaan" became a chartbuster.

| Song | Singer(s) | Lyrics | Duration |
|---|---|---|---|
| "Vaazhkayin Paathayil" | Vijay Yesudas | Mu. Metha | 5:45 |
| "Ulaga Azhagi Naan Thaan" | Janani Bharadwaj | Palani Bharathi | 5:03 |
| "Kadalaina Kadalai" | Manikka Vinayagam, Anuradha Sriram | Kamakodiyan | 5:13 |
| "Tajmahal Kaathale" | Priya Himesh, Ananth | Palani Bharathi | 4:11 |
| "Ithu Thaana Kaathal Mazhai" | Sathyan, Priya Himesh, Suchitra | Pa. Vijay | 4:47 |
| "Yaaradicha Yaaradicha" | Srinivas | Pa. Vijay | 4:58 |

== Release and reception ==
Initially, the film had its release date fixed on 14 April 2007 (coinciding with Tamil New Year), but it was released on 1 June 2007. A reviewer for kollywoodtoday.net wrote, "Nothing new shown in the movie except new faces, the song scored by Bhardwaj sounds Ok. Debutant director able to cover the film with allotted money and time, new faces had cleared the screen without much difficulty" and called it "below average". Malini Mannath of Chennai Online wrote "'Pirappu' was meant to be caste-centric film. But somewhere along the way it diverges into a jealousy-centric one, with the message not really coming through". Lajjavathi of Kalki wrote it was about caste cruelty but the story stumbles somewhere. They dragged the film to the core instead of coming to the point they intended to.
