= Porkkaalam =

- Poster
- Directed by: Cheran
- Written by: Cheran
- Produced by: M. Kaja Mydeen; V. Gnanavelu; V. Jayaprakash
- Starring: Murali; Meena; Sanghavi
- Cinematography: Priyan
- Edited by: K. Thanikachalam
- Music by: Deva
- Production company: Roja Combines
- Release date: 30 October 1997
- Country: India
- Language: Tamil

Porkkaalam (transl. Golden Age) is a 1997 Indian Tamil-language drama film written and directed by Cheran. The film stars Murali, Meena and Sanghavi. It was released on 30 October 1997, Diwali, and became a huge success. The film was remade in Telugu as Manikyam (1999), in Hindi as Meri Pyaari Bahania Banegi Dulhania (2001), and in Kannada as Odahuttidavalu (2006).

== Plot ==
Manikkam is a potter by profession. He has a sister, who is born mute. Murali has to struggle a lot as the handicraft industry is a dying industry and a good amount of money is taken away by his father Ramaiya, a drunkard and gambler. But, he tries to hide his sorrows by having fun with his sister and servant Thangamani, who is also his trusted friend. He is in love with his neighbour Maragatham, a weaver. He wants to get his sister married to a noble man, but many reject her as she is mute.

Finally, one man agrees to marry his sister but on condition that Manikkam must offer dowry. Manikkam then sells many things dearer to him to get money for the dowry. But, that money is taken away by his father and the marriage fails to go through. Thangamani offers to marry his sister without asking for dowry and Manikkam goes home along with Thangamani to convey this happy news to his sister. But it was too late as the sister commits suicide. Manikkam as a penance decides to marry a disabled girl.

== Cast ==
- Murali as Manikkam
- Meena as Maragadham
- Sanghavi as Muthamma
- Manivannan as Ramaiya
- Vadivelu as Thangamani
- Rajeshwari as Panchavarnam
- C. R. Saraswathi as Kalyani
- Delhi Ganesh as Subbaiya
- Ilavarasu as Rasu
- Bala Singh as Sundaram
- Crane Manohar
- Scissor Manohar
- Kanal Kannan as the postman (special appearance)
- Cheran as the photographer (special appearance)

== Production ==
The filming was held at Karighatta, Mysore.

== Soundtrack ==
The soundtrack was composed by Deva, with lyrics by Vairamuthu. The song "Thanjavooru Mannu Eduthu" was played at the funeral of Singaporean politician S. R. Nathan in 2016.

Track listing
No.	Title	Singer(s)	Length
1.	"Chinna Kanangkuruvi"	Krishnaraj, Febi Mani, Malaysia Vasudevan	06:13
2.	"Karuvella Kaatukkulae"	Sujatha Mohan, Anuradha Sriram, Arunmozhi	05:28
3.	"Thanjavooru Mannu Eduthu"	Krishnaraj	05:25
4.	"Chingucha Chingucha"	K. S. Chithra	04:40
5.	"Oona Oonam"	Deva, Kovai Kamala	04:49
Total length:			26:35

== Reception ==
Ji of Kalki said despite being an age old theme of brother and sister, Cheran handled it skilfully and appreciating the performances of Murali and the actress who portrayed his sister but called Vadivelu's character and his song as unnecessary. During the 100th day function of Arunachalam, Rajinikanth appreciated this film and gifted a gold chain to Cheran.

== Accolades ==
Event	Category	Recipients	Ref.
Tamil Nadu State Film Awards	Best Director	Cheran	
Tamil Nadu State Film Awards	Best Actress	Meena	
Tamil Nadu State Film Awards	Best Male Playback Singer	Krishnaraj	
Dinakaran Cinema Awards	Best Director	Cheran	
Cinema Express Awards	Best Actress	Meena	
Cinema Express Awards	Best Playback Singer (Male)	Krishnaraj	
