= Thavamai Thavamirundhu =

Thavamai Thavamirundu
- Directed by: Cheran
- Written by: Cheran
- Produced by: P. Shanmugam
- Starring: Rajkiran; Cheran; Saranya Ponvannan; Senthil Kumar; Meenal; Padmapriya
- Cinematography: M. S. Prabhu
- Edited by: B. Lenin Art Direction = Jaya Kumar(JK)
- Music by: Sabesh–Murali
- Production company: Cirussti
- Release date: 1 November 2005
- Running time: Original Cut: 275 minutes Theatrical Cut: 204 minutes
- Country: India
- Language: Tamil
- Budget: 3 Crores
- Box office: 25 Crores

Thavamai Thavamirundhu (transl. With much penance) is a 2005 Indian Tamil-language drama film written and directed by Cheran. The film stars Rajkiran, Cheran and Saranya Ponvannan, in lead roles while, Senthil Kumar, Padmapriya and Meenal portraying supporting roles. The music was composed by the duo Sabesh–Murali with cinematography by M. S. Prabhu, art direction by Jaya Kumar and editing by B. Lenin. The film released on 1 November Deepavali 2005.

The film won the National Film Award for Best Film on Family Welfare. At 275 minutes, it is the longest Tamil film and fourth longest Indian film by runtime as well as the longest Indian film with a theatrical release.

== Plot ==
The movie begins with Muthaiah being admitted to the hospital due to a serious head injury. The incident that led to the injury is kept in suspense for the audience. Muthaiah's second son, Ramalingam, narrates the story while visiting his father in the hospital. Overcome by emotions, he recollects, along his trip, bits and pieces of memories from his younger days with his father.

The first part of the story is about how Muthaiah, a father in a lower-middle-class family, struggles to raise his children. Muthaiah runs a printing press and works really hard to make ends meet, but he still has to borrow money from the exploitative local moneylenders to give his sons a good education. There is a scene where the children eagerly expect their father to return home with gifts during the festive season. He encounters a cash-flow setback in his business but seizes an opportunity to make some money by working through the night. This scene encapsulates the sacrifices the father makes for his sons' happiness.

The story then moves to the children's teenage years, when they struggle to resist the temptations of adolescence. Ramalingam is a good student and gets admitted to an engineering college, where he gradually falls in love with his classmate Vasanthi. He finds freedom when he moves from his home to his college residence. When Ramalingam is madly in love with Vasanthi, they have a chance for privacy, and they succumb to temptation. This leads to an accidental pregnancy and raises questions about their future.

Meanwhile, Ramalingam's brother, Ramanathan, was married and had just given birth to a child. Ramanathan has a misunderstanding with his father and walks out of his parents' home. The main cause of friction within the family is the lack of privacy for Ramanathan and his wife, and the lack of freedom for the young couple to manage the day-to-day affairs of their family.

Alas, Muthaiah expects his sons to help him repay the loans he took out for their education, and they reconcile. Amid the chaos, Ramalingam is unable to find an opportunity to confess his mistake to his parents. As time runs out, Ramalingam and Vasanthi elope to Chennai, unable to reveal the truth about the pregnancy to their respective parents and face a very uncertain future. They decide to get married and search for jobs. Ramalingam is unable to find a well-paying job and takes up a job at a printing press as a stopgap arrangement. He has to console Vasanthi in a few situations, even as he himself is facing many trials and tribulations. Ramalingam and Vasanthi are a loving couple despite their poor financial situation.

Vasanthi eventually gives birth to a daughter, but Ramalingam struggles to pay for medical expenses. He calls his former classmate and borrows money from his friend. The friend informs Ramalingam's father about Ramalingam's situation. Muthaiah comes to meet Ramalingam and gives him some cash for the newborn child. He also recalls how he himself faced a cash crunch when Ramalingam was born. Muthaiah's gesture touches Ramalingam and Vasanthi, who decide to move back to Ramalingam's village to get the support from his family in raising the child. They find acceptance from their parents and are relieved. Slowly, Ramalingam finds a good job and moves up in his career. The family becomes more comfortable and moves to Madurai. They become very close-knit. Ramalingam is responsible and cares for his parents.

Ramalingam facilitates a family reunion with his brother's family, and they reconcile. Meanwhile, Ramalingam's mother, Saradha, passes away after many years of a happy, satisfying life with Ramalingam's family. After Saradha's final rites, Muthaiah decides to stay in the village to relive the days that he spent with his deceased wife. Meanwhile, Ramanathan approaches his father to ask for financial help by selling their family home in the village, and Muthaiah becomes upset. While upset, Muthaiah slips and falls into a well. He is treated in the hospital but succumbs to his injuries and passes away.

== Cast ==
- Rajkiran as Muthaiah
- Cheran as Ramalingam
- Padmapriya as Vasanthi
- Saranya as Saradha
- Senthil Kumar as Ramanathan
- Meenal as Lalitha
- Ilavarasu as Azhagarsamy
- Poo Ramu as Moneylender

== Soundtrack ==
The soundtrack album is composed by the musical duo Sabesh–Murali.

Track list
No.	Title	Lyrics	Singer(s)	Length
1.	"Ore Oru Oorukkulle"	Snehan	Sabesh, Jayakumar	5.55
2.	"Unnai Saranadaindhen"	Thenmozhi	Prasanna, Kalyani	3.52
3.	"Oru Muraidhan"	Pa. Vijay	Unni Menon	6.07
4.	"Yenna Paarkkirai"	Cheran	Yugendran, Suchitra	3.58
5.	"Aakkatti"	SA. Perumal	Jayamurthi	4.31
6.	"Theme"		Sarath, Madhu Balakrishnan, Sudha Ragunadhan	4.28
7.	"Aavaaram Poove"	Thenmozhi	Madhu Balakrishnan	2.24
Total length:				29.55

=== Unofficial Track ===
The song "Naane Tholaintha Kathai" was featured in the film but was not included in the official audio soundtrack album. It was composed by Sabesh-Murali, with lyrics by Cheran.

Bonus track
No.	Title	Lyrics	Singer(s)	Length
1.	"Naane Tholaintha Kathai"	Cheran	Prasanna	3.35

== Release ==
=== Critical reception ===
Sify wrote "Cheran has kept the flag of uncompromised cinema flying and is one of the handful of directors, whose calling card remain his artistry over the medium. Once again its time to rejoice as his latest Thavamai Thavamirundhu is brilliant and appeals as much to the mind as the heart." Lajjavathi of Kalki praised the acting of Rajkiran, Saranya, Padmapriya and other actors but felt despite Cheran acting being good he messed up in some places while praise also directed towards art direction, cinematography and music. She noted Cheran should be appreciated for giving more importance for Rajkiran than himself while also portraying his and his brother's character as weak people. Lajjavathi concluded saying Cheran as a director should continue to give such films and added Thavamai Thavamirundhu is not just a kurinji flower of Tamil cinema more than that. Malini Mannath of Chennai Online wrote "Thavamai Thavamirundhu is a must-watch film, an enriching experience on celluloid!". G. Ulaganathan of Deccan Herald wrote "The rural atmosphere and the simple dialogues takes us closer to the characters who resemble people one meets every day. The story unfolds in a slow pace and he uses his favourite flashbacks and black and white scenes to drive home the message effectively".

=== Box office ===
- The film grossed RS.120 million at the box office.
- Initially, the run time was four hours and thirty-five minutes. Exhibitors forced the director to trim the film to accommodate more shows per day.

== Awards and nominations ==
- Filmfare Award for Best Supporting Actress – Tamil – Saranya Ponvannan - Won
- Filmfare Award for Best Supporting Actor – Tamil – Rajkiran - Won
- Filmfare Award for Best Supporting Actor – Tamil - Senthil Kumar - Nominated
- Filmfare Award for Best Female Debut – South – Padmapriya - Won
- National Film Award for Best Film on Family Welfare – Thavamai Thavamirundhu - Won
- Tamil Nadu State Film Award for Best Film- Third Prize, 2005 - Won
