= Pudhiya Geethai =

- Release poster
- Directed by: K. P. Jagan
- Written by: K. P. Jagan
- Produced by: Vishwas Sundar
- Starring: Vijay; Meera Jasmine; Ameesha Patel
- Cinematography: Ramesh Krishna
- Edited by: V. T. Vijayan
- Music by: Songs: Yuvan Shankar Raja; Score: Karthik Raja
- Production company: Viswaas
- Release date: 8 May 2003
- Running time: 157 minutes
- Country: India
- Language: Tamil

Pudhiya Geethai (transl. New Gita) is a 2003 Indian Tamil-language supernatural action drama film written and directed by K. P. Jagan (in his directorial debut). The film stars Vijay, who plays the role of a brilliant young man, along with Meera Jasmine and Ameesha Patel. Kalabhavan Mani and Karunas play other supporting roles. Notably, this film is Patel's first and remains her only Tamil film till date. The film, which has music scored by brothers Yuvan Shankar Raja and Karthik Raja.

Pudhiya Geethai was released on 8 May 2003. The film received mixed reviews and became a commercial failure.

== Plot ==
The film starts with a polydactylic baby boy born to Chinnaya from Nagapattinam, who works for Swamy, an astrologer. Swamy writes the baby's horoscope and understands that the child will grow up to be intelligent and responsible, but he also predicts that the child's life will be only 27 years long. He suggests the baby be named Sarathy but does not inform him about the short life.

In the present, in Chennai, Sarathy is intelligent, optimistic, excels in studies and sports, and is liked by everyone around him. He takes care of his mother, Thaiyalnayagi, and sister, following his father's death. Suji is Sarathy's close friend and considers him her well-wisher. Sarathy runs a restaurant with his friends part-time and is also involved in real estate transactions, earning brokerages. Jo is Suji's friend who teases her by being closer to Sarathy, revealing the love that she has for him.

Reddiyar is a rich but ingenious real estate businessman who cheats many people by allotting improper plots. Sarathy knows about Reddiyar's plans and fights against him, supporting the poor people, which creates enmity between Reddiyar and Sarathy.

Lawrence, Sarathy's friend, falls in love with Sarathy's sister but is scared of whether Sarathy will accept their love. Sarathy happily accepts and also convinces his mother. Sarathy's sister's wedding is arranged. Now, Sarathy is 27 years old. Meanwhile, Suji feels jealous of Sarathy and Jo getting close, but Jo realizes that Suji is in love with Sarathy. Finally, Suji proposes to Sarathy, which he accepts.

On the day of Sarathy's sister's marriage, Jo explains the love that Suji and Sarathy have for each other. Sarathy goes to meet Suji, but Reddiyar has planned to kill Sarathy on the way. Sarathy fights Reddiyar's men, leaving Reddiyar alone. However, Sarathy does not kill Reddiyar and instead makes him understand the value of life and talks about the positive attitude one should have. This makes Reddiyar realize his mistake.

Sarathy leaves the place to meet Suji but has an accident on the way and gets admitted to the hospital with severe injuries. The doctors say that the chances of his survival are minimal, and all his family and friends cry outside the hospital. However, Reddiyar arrives and sees everyone crying and panicking. He tells everyone to stop crying and keep calling Sarathy with positive energy, which will help him return to normal. Everyone starts calling Sarathy, and his condition improves drastically. Sarathy is saved and recovers. He then lives 100 years of his wish, which makes his life happy.

The film ends with the message that a positive attitude is essential for everyone to succeed, and even death will revive them.

== Cast ==
- Vijay as Sarathy
- Meera Jasmine as Suji
- Ameesha Patel as Jo
- Kalabhavan Mani as Reddiyar
- Karunas as Ganesh
- Kalairani as Thaiyalnayagi, Sarathy's mother
- Sarath Babu as Annamalai
- Sanjeev as Lawrence
- Ilavarasu as Shekar
- Sadhana as Suji's mother
- Besant Ravi
- Florent Pereira
- "Sathi Leelavathi" Yogini as Sarathy's sister
- Madhumitha
- Srilekha Rajendran as Villager
- Nassar as Chinnaya, Sarathy's father (cameo appearance)
- K. Viswanath as Swamy, an astrologer (cameo appearance)
- Inigo Prabhakaran as Sarathy's friend (uncredited)
- Raghava Lawrence as a dancer in "Annamalai"

== Production ==
The film was initially titled Sarathy after the lead character's name. It was later retitled Geethai with Esha Deol as heroine. However, the film eventually featured two lead actresses with Meera Jasmine being signed on to be a part of the project after the success of her 2002 film, Run. Ameesha Patel later accepted to be a part of the film, replacing Deol, after getting the entire script translated in English for her to read. Before release, the film's title was changed to Pudhiya Geethai after Hindu organisations objected to the title. Shooting wrapped in March 2003.

== Soundtrack ==
Pudhiya Geethai

Soundtrack album by Yuvan Shankar Raja
- Released: 29 March 2003
- Recorded: 2002–2003
- Genre: Feature film soundtrack
- Label: Five Star Audio
- Producer: Yuvan Shankar Raja

Yuvan Shankar Raja chronology
Aadanthe Ado Type (2003)	Pudhiya Geethai (2003)	Kadhal Kondein (2003)

The songs were composed by Yuvan Shankar Raja, collaborating with Vijay for the first time, while his elder brother Karthik Raja composed the film's background score. The audio CD containing songs released on 29 March 2003 and features 6 tracks, the lyrics were penned by Vaali, Pa. Vijay, Yugabharathi, and Vijay Sagar.

Tracklist
No.	Title	Lyrics	Artist(s)	Length
1.	"Naan Odum Ilaignan"	Vaali	Mano, Tippu	04:56
2.	"Mercury Poove"	Pa. Vijay	Nideesh Gopalan, Bhavatharini, Bonnie Chakraborty	04:36
3.	"Vasiyakaara (Version 1)"	Yugabharathi	Devan, Chitra Sivaraman	03:52
4.	"Manase"	Pa. Vijay	Bonnie Chakraborty, Tippu, Swarnalatha	05:05
5.	"Vasiyakaara (Version 2)"	Yugabharathi	Hariharan, Chitra Sivaraman	03:52
6.	"Annamalai"	Vijay Sagar	Tippu, Devan	04:51
Total length:				27:14

== Release and reception ==
Pudhiya Geethai was released on 8 May 2003. The critic from The Hindu stated that "the end is predictable, but the conviction with which the climax drives home the message makes it interesting." Ananda Vikatan rated the film 39 out of 100. Chennai Online wrote "The debutant director can be commended for etching such a beautiful character, albeit a too-good-to-be-true one. But the director's dilemma, whether to stand by the astrological predictions or to prove them wrong, is evident in the latter part of the narration. The inspiration seems to be the Telugu film Murari (2001), which too had a similar knot and ending". Visual Dasan of Kalki wrote Kodambakkam lacks films that supports the title, in that way Pudhiya Geethai feels complete. Indiainfo wrote "The film loosely inspired by Telugu hit film, MURARI, has illogical storyline. With no impressive screenplay, it fails to hold the audiences all the while". Sify wrote "Technically tacky and story wise utterly lamebrain, Puthiya Geethai looks likes it has been ghost-directed by Vijay, though the credit goes to Jagan".

The film was a disaster at the Tamil Nadu box office for Vijay.
