= Navya Nair =

Indian actress (born 1985)

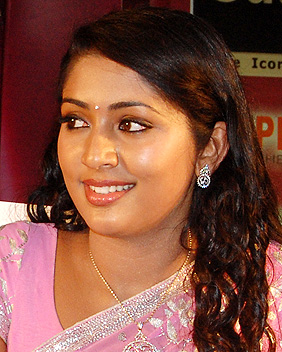
- Nair in 2010
- Born: Dhanya Veena; 14 October 1985 (age 41); Cheppad, Alappuzha district, Kerala
- Occupation: Actress
- Years active: 2001–present
- Spouse: Santhosh S. Menon (m. 2010)
- Children: 1
- Relatives: K. Madhu (Maternal Uncle)

Navya Nair (born Dhanya Veena; 14 October 1985) is an Indian actress who has appeared predominantly in Malayalam cinema along with a few Kannada and Tamil language films.

== Early and personal life ==
Navya Nair was born as Dhanya Veena on the 14th of October 1985 at Cheppad in the Alappuzha district of Kerala to Raju Nair, a telecom employee, and Veena, a school teacher. Her brother is Rahul R. Nair, who lives in Dubai. Filmmaker K. Madhu is her maternal uncle.

Navya studied at St. Mary's Girls' High School in Kayamkulam. She learned classical dance at a young age and has won the Kalathilakam title as a student of Bethany Balikamadam Girls' High School, Nangiarkulangara, in the District School Youth Festival. She then studied at M.S.M. Higher Secondary School in Kayamkulam, where her mother was a teacher. She holds a B.A. degree in English and an MBA in Finance.

Film director Sibi Malayil preferred Navya as her screen name because he believed Dhanya was inappropriate for an actress.

Navya married Santhosh Menon, a Mumbai-settled Malayali, on 21 January 2010, and the couple have a son, Sai Krishna, born the same year.

== Career ==
=== Debut and success (2001–2005) ===
Navya Nair started her film career with Ishtam in 2001, opposite Dileep directed by Sibi Malayil. The film was a commercial success for its sheer humour and fresh subject. Critics described her as the surprise of the film. She then acted in Mazhathullikkilukkam (2002) with Dileep, a commercially successful film. She then appeared in Kunjikoonan (2002), which also became a box office hit.

Her next release was the 2002 Malayalam film Nandanam directed by Ranjith and starring Prithviraj Sukumaran. Her portrayal of Balamani, an orphan who works as a maid and is an ardent devotee of Lord Guruvayurappan, received critical acclaim. She bagged several awards for her role, notably receiving her first Kerala State Film Award for Best Actress. She soon became a household name. Over the years, she has been remembered for her role as Balamani. Her other releases of the year were Kalyanaraman, alongside Dileep and Kunchacko Boban which became a commercial success and Chathurangam starring Mohanlal which was a failure at the box office.

In 2003, Vellithira, Ammakilikkoodu with Prithviraj Sukumaran and Gramophone starring Dileep and Meera Jasmine were box office failures. The soundtracks to Vellithira and Gramaphone were popular. However, this year's Pattanathil Sundaran with Dileep was a hit. She played the role of the wife of a ration shop owner who accepted a job as a clerk in the Secretariat against her husband's desires.

In 2004, she played a minor role in Sethurama Iyer CBI. She then had two releases Jalolsavam by Sibi Malayil and Chathikkatha Chanthu by Rafi Mecartin, starring Jayasurya, with the latter becoming a box office success. She played Vasumathi who seeks out the man who sent her some letters accidentally, but she believes he did so on purpose. Her encounters with Salim Kumar in the movie are still popular. She made her Tamil debut with Azhagiya Theeye, generally received positive reviews. However, the film was a commercial failure.

In 2005, she appeared in Immini Nalloraal, Deepangal Sakshi and Sarkar Dada. All of which were critical and commercial failures. Her other release of the year, Pandippada directed by Rafi Mecartin became commercially successful at the box office. She then appeared in the Tamil film Chidambarathil Oru Appasamy. S. R. Ashok Kumar of The Hindu described her as "the beleaguered wife who steals the show." Her portrayal of Saira Hussain in Dr. Biju's directorial debut Saira and her role as Karunya in Alberrt Antoni's Kanne Madanguka earned her the second Kerala State Film Award for Best Actress.

=== Expansion into Tamil and Kannada cinema (2006–2014) ===
She had three Tamil releases in 2006 Pasa Kiligal, Amirtham, and the National Award-winning Aadum Koothu. Her Malayalam films at this time, Kalabham, Pathaaka, Ali Bhai and Kichamani MBA received negative reception. Her next film Maya Kannadi which Cheran directed and starred in, received mixed reviews overall but praise for her role. She appeared in Sila Nerangalil directed by Jayaraj which opened to a positive reception and was a box office success.

She made her Kannada debut opposite Darshan in Gaja, which was a box-office hit. Films like SMS, Calendar, and Banaras were poorly received, but her performances were praised nonetheless. Her Kannada film, Namyajamanru (2009) alongside Vishnuvardhan opened to positive reviews from critics. A critic from The Times of India described her as "Navya Nair at her best." She starred in Bhagyada Balegara opposite Shiva Rajkumar, receiving praise for her performance. She appeared in the anthology film Kerala Cafe (2009).

In 2010, her films were Drona and Yugapurushan with Mammootty, the Tamil film Rasikkum Seemane and Sadgamaya with Suresh Gopi. She then appeared in Boss with Darshan, but the film could not repeat the success of their previous collaboration. Scene Onnu Nammude Veedu was her last Malayalam film before going on hiatus.

In 2014, she starred in Drishya along with V. Ravichandran.

=== Return to cinema post-marriage (2021–present) ===
After marriage, Nair took a break from appearing in cinema and started appearing in television programs. She is currently one of the judges on the reality show Kidilam with Mukesh and Rimi Tomy.

In her comeback film, Drishya 2 (2021), she reprised her role as Seetha, which received critical acclaim like its predecessor and was a decent hit at the box office. Her comeback film in Malayalam became Oruthee (2022), directed by V. K. Prakash, and she was cast with Vinayakan and Saiju Kurup plays Radhamani, a middle-class woman and a ticket conductor on a boat whose husband is abroad and who has a daughter, thriving from the helplessness in society. The film, which dealt with true events, received critical acclaim for her performance.

== Filmography ==
Key
†	Denotes films that have not yet been released

=== Malayalam films ===
Year	Title	Role	Notes
2001	Ishtam	Anjana Pillai	
2002	Mazhathullikkilukkam	Sophie	
2002	Kunjikoonan	Chembakam	
2002	Nandanam	Balamani	
2002	Kalyanaraman	Gowri	
2002	Chathurangam	Sherin Mathew	
2003	Vellithira	Thatha	
2003	Gramophone	Pooja	
2003	Ammakilikkoodu	Akhila	
2003	Pattanathil Sundaran	Radhamani Sundaresan	
2004	Sethurama Iyer CBI	Rachana	
2004	Jalolsavam	Geetha	
2004	Chathikkatha Chanthu	Vasumathi, Ambika	Dual role
2004	Parayam	Herself	Cameo appearance
2005	Immini Nalloraal	Sneha	
2005	Deepangal Sakshi	Krishnaveni	
2005	Pandippada	Meena Karuppusamy	
2005	Sarkar Dada	Sandhya	
2005	Kanne Madanguka	Kaarunya Bhagyanathan	
2005	Saira	Saira Hussain	
2006	Kalabham	Sivakami	
2006	Pathaaka	Ashitha Muhammed	
2007	Ali Bhai	Chenthamara	
2007	Kichamani MBA	Shivani Menon	
2008	SMS	Indumathi	
2009	Banaras	Devu	
2009	Calendar	Kochurani	
2009	Ivar Vivahitharayal	Herself	Cameo appearance
2009	Kerala Cafe	Sheela Johnykutty	
2010	Drona 2010	Mithra Antarjanam	
2010	Yugapurushan	Savitri Antarjanam, Saradha	Dual role
2010	Sadgamaya	Yamuna	
2012	Scene Onnu Nammude Veedu	Manju	
2022	Oruthee	Radhamani	
2023	Janaki Jaane	Janaki	
2025	Paathirathri	Probation SI Jancy Kurian	

=== Other language films ===
Year	Title	Role	Language	Notes
2004	Azhagiya Theeye	Nandhini	Tamil	
2005	Chidambarathil Oru Appasamy	Thenmozhi Elangovan	Tamil	
2006	Pasa Kiligal	Maragatham	Tamil	
2006	Amirtham	Amirtha Ramaswamy	Tamil	
2007	Maya Kannadi	Maheswari	Tamil	
2008	Gaja	Shwetha	Kannada	
2008	Sila Nerangalil	Thamarai Chidambaram, Anjali	Tamil	Dual role
2008	Aadum Koothu	Manimegalai	Tamil	
2008	Raman Thediya Seethai	Senthamarai	Tamil	Guest appearance
2009	Namyajamanru	Charulatha	Kannada	
2009	Bhagyada Balegara	Cheluvi	Kannada	
2010	Rasikkum Seemane	Gayathri	Tamil	
2011	Boss	Raani	Kannada	
2014	Drishya	Seetha	Kannada	
2021	Drishya 2	Seetha	Kannada	

== Television ==
- All TV shows are in Malayalam language

Year	Program	Role	Channel	Ref
2011-2012	Dance Dance	Judge	Asianet	
2013	Bharthakanmarude Shradhakku	Host Judge	Asianet	
2016-2017	Laughing Villa	Host	Surya TV	
2018	Onnum Onnum Moonu	Guest (Episode 19)	Mazhavil Manorama	
2019	Comedy Nights with Suraj	Guest (Episode 33)	Zee Keralam	
2019	Comedy Stars Season 2	Judge	Asianet	
2021-2022	Star Magic	Judge	Flowers TV	
2021	Mr & Mrs	Guest (Finale)	Zee Keralam	
2022– 2023	Kidilam	Judge	Mazhavil Manorama	
2023	Red Carpet	Guest (Episode 500)	Amrita TV	
2023	Star Singer season 9	Judge	Asianet	Celebrity judge for devotional round
2024	Sreshtabharatham	Dancer	Amrita TV	Special performance
2024-2025	Super Show	Judge	Zee Keralam	

== Awards and nominations ==
- 2002 : Kerala State Film Award for Best Actress & Filmfare Award for Best Actress – Malayalam for Nandanam
- 2005 : Kerala State Film Award for Best Actress for Kanne Madanguka & Saira
- 2022 : Nominated Filmfare Award for Best Actress – Malayalam for Oruthee
- 2023 : Nominated Filmfare Award for Best Actress – Malayalam for Janaki Jaane
