= Cheran (director) =

Indian film director and actor

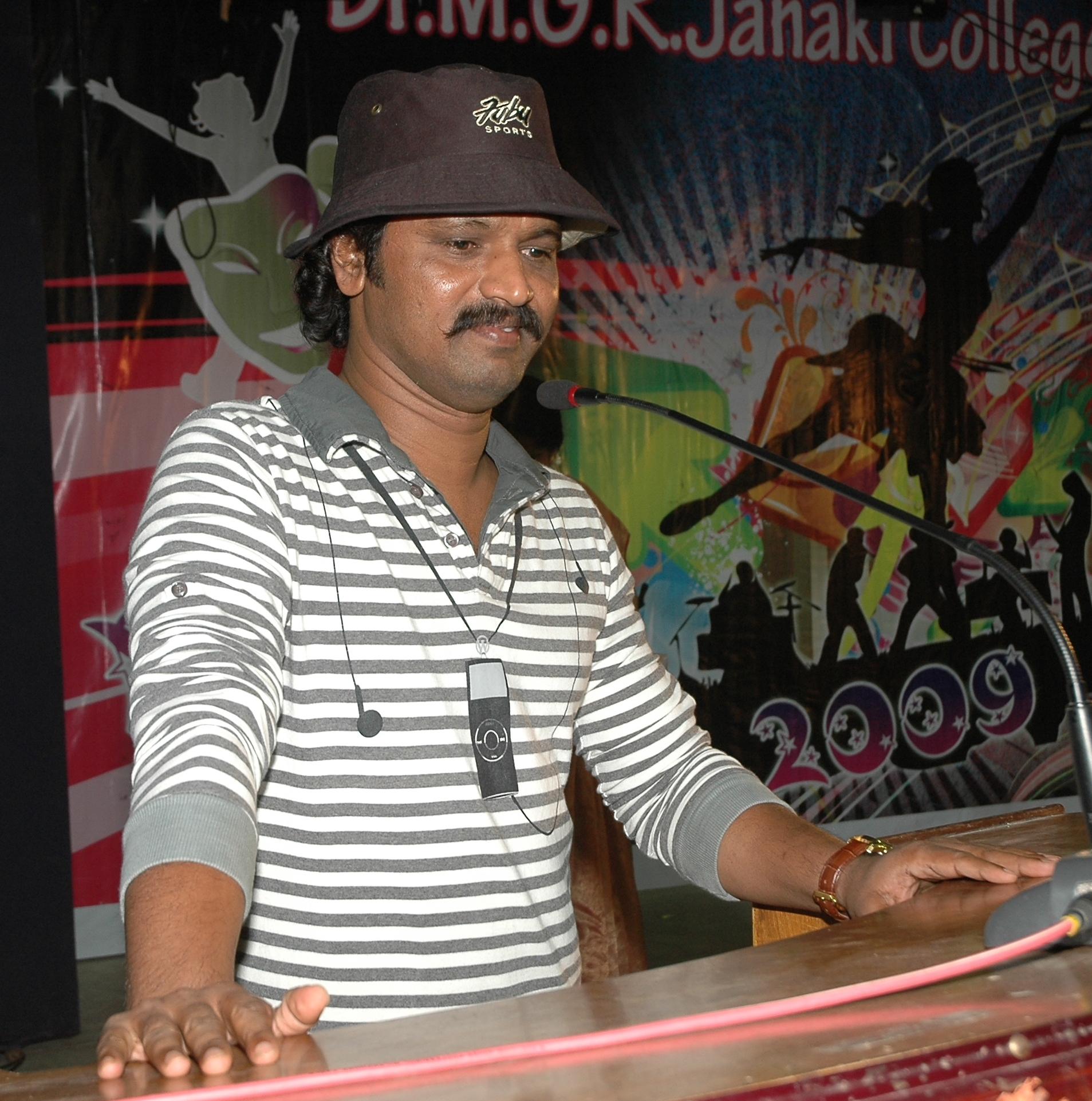
- Cheran in 2009
- Born: 12 December 1970 (age 55); Melur, Madurai, Tamil Nadu, India
- Occupations: film director, film producer, actor, lyricist
- Years active: 1997–present
- Spouse: Selvarani
- Children: 2

Cheran (born 12 December 1970) is an Indian film director, producer, actor and lyricist known for his works in Tamil cinema. He is a four time National Film Award winner for Vetri Kodi Kattu (2000), Autograph (2004),Aadum Koothu and Thavamai Thavamirundhu (2005). He has also won five Tamil Nadu State Film Awards and six South Filmfare Awards.

Cheran initially made breakthrough as a director by making village-based drama films focusing on human relationships, and achieved critical acclaim for his work in Bharathi Kannamma (1997) and Porkkaalam (1997). He later moved on to work on themes exploring how globalisation affects the Indian middle class, and told the story of scam job offers in Vetri Kodi Kattu (2000) and village-to-city emigration in Pandavar Bhoomi (2001). His most renowned film till date, Autograph (2004), is a semi-autobiographical tale of a man at four stage of his life. He later also experienced success with the family drama film Thavamai Thavamirundhu (2005) and as an actor in films such as Pirivom Santhippom (2008) and Yuddham Sei (2011).

== Early life ==
Cheran was born in Pazhaiyurpatty village near Madurai. His father Pandian was a film projector operator in Vellalur's touring theatre. His mother Kamala was a primary school teacher, and he has two sisters.

He came to Chennai to pursue a career in films, and was keen to become an actor. Initially, he started career as a production manager in some films. In the film Puriyaadha Pudhir (1990), he worked as an assistant director to K. S. Ravikumar, and was later promoted to an associate director from Cheran Pandiyan (1991) to Nattamai (1994).

== Career ==
=== 1997–2003: Breakthrough and early success ===
Cheran made his directorial debut through Bharathi Kannamma (1997), a village drama narrating the relationship between the daughter of a rich family and their retainer, starring Parthiban and Meena. During its release, the film ran into trouble with Thevar community who almost imposed a ban of the film due to its content. However the film won good reviews and performed well at the box office. In spite of controversies, the film became successful at box-office. His second film, Porkkaalam (1997) was in the same genre, and also performed well commercially as well as winning favourable reviews from critics. The film, which explored the life of a hard-working potter and his poor family, earned Cheran an award for best director from the Tamil Nadu State.

Unlike his first two films, his third film did not fare well at the box office despite winning positive reviews. Desiya Geetham (1998) told the story of a Chief Minister being kidnapped and taken to a remote village, and it subsequently met with a controversial response from politicians. Despite Cheran's intervention and explanation of the script to senior political figures, the film was quickly removed from cinema halls, much to the director's dismay. However, the film won good reviews and a critic noted it was "a rare, good movie with a message" and added that Cheran "deserves credit for making a movie that tries to tell something and keeping away from the usual, commercial add-ons". Following the film's failure, Cheran announced several projects before opting not to continue with them. He initially considered other films with Murali, one co-starring Shammi Kapoor titled Paraseega Roja, and another co-starring Meena titled Maaya Maan but the films did not progress. Cheran then moved on an urban love story starring Prashanth, Shamitha and himself. The film was initially titled Inniya Kaadalargale and then renamed as Vinnodum Mugilodum, but the film was also later dropped. Another light-hearted film titled Aagaya Kottai was planned with Arunkumar, Suriya and Raju Sundaram, but it did not start production.

He later worked again with Parthiban and Murali for the social comedy drama, Vetri Kodi Kattu (2000), which focused on scams committed by agents who promised lavish jobs and salaries abroad, and in the process swindling the money of innocent people. The film won critical acclaim upon release, and Cheran won a National Film Award for his work in the film. Cheran then made Pandavar Bhoomi (2001) with actors Arunkumar and his father Vijayakumar alongside Shamitha and Rajkiran, which explored themes of wholesale emigration of villagers to the city and the loss of good, solid agricultural lands, culture and solidarity. The film performed well at the box office and garnered mixed reviews from critics. A reviewer from Sify.com stated the film was "typical overdose of Cheran melodrama masala". Cheran then turned actor in director Thangar Bachan's romantic drama film Solla Marandha Kadhai (2002). The film garnered mixed review but performed well at the box office.

=== 2003–2006: Autograph and national recognition ===
Cheran first began work on Autograph in October 2000 with Prabhu Deva and then Vikram cast, though the actors later opted out as a result of schedule clashes. In early 2002, Cheran announced that he was going to instead make a film titled Pokkisham and Kanika would star alongside him. However he failed to find a financier and moved back to making Autograph. As producers were unwilling to finance the film, Cheran opted to produce and star in the film himself and the film consequently took over a year to make. Autograph told the story of a man named Senthil, presented in four stages of his life – at school, college, work and during his marriage, and Cheran called the film "semi-autobiographical". The film starred him alongside Sneha, Gopika, Mallika and Kaniha, and had a popular soundtrack composed by Bharadwaj. Four different cinematographers worked on the film; Ravi Varman had shot the school episode in Senthil's early life with a 35 mm lens, Vijay Milton shot the Kerala scenes, Dwaraknath shot the Chennai episode with a steady cam and Shanky Mahendran shot the "'live' part" of the film when the camera uses the point of view of Senthil's character.

Made at a budget of ₹2 crore rupees, the film garnered over ₹10 crores at the box office and became one of the most profitable Tamil films of the year. The film benefited from positive word-of-mouth and Cheran subsequently increased the number of prints from sixty five to eighty five for the second week, a rarity in Tamil cinema. The film won positive reviews from film critics, with Sify.com writing that "Cheran has used all his artists to perfection to make this love story with polish and panache". Dennis Harvey of Variety wrote it was a "well-mounted production has too much familiar melodrama, and few real highlights (notably one delightful homage to ’70s Tamil musicals), but remains an easy watch". For the film, Cheran won a National Award for Best Popular Film, along with two Filmfare Awards and two Tamil Nadu State Film Awards, for Best Film and Best Director. The film became renowned as a "cult classic" and spawned several other inspirations and remakes in the Indian film industry. Cheran then restarted work on "Pokkisham" in 2004 but postponed the film after a falling out with the new lead actress, Meera Jasmine. He then directed the drama film "Thavamai Thavamirundhu" (2005), which focused on family relationships and Tamil culture. Cheran cast himself in the lead role alongside Rajkiran, Saranya, and Padmapriya in this movie. During production, the film went over budget and took nearly 145 days of shoot in Karaikudi, Madurai and Chennai. The film was made at a budget of ₹2 crore rupees, and went on to make profits for the producers. The film also won positive reviews, with a critic from Sify.com noting that "Cheran has kept the flag of uncompromised cinema flying and is one of the handful of directors, whose calling card remain his artistry over the medium", adding that the film is "brilliant and appeals as much to the mind as the heart". Upon release, the film won several awards including another National Award for best film on family welfare.

=== 2007–2013: Focus on acting assignments ===
He restarted work on Pokkisham for the third time in December 2005, after completing Thavamai Thavamirundhu (2005), and approached Sandhya to play the lead role. The film did not take off so he moved on to make Maya Kannadi (2007) starring himself and Navya Nair. Mayakannadi was based on the concept of middle class dreams turning sour due to lack of commitment and created attention prior to release owing to Cheran's recent success. However, the film fared poorly at the box office and lost money for distributors. It received mixed reviews and a critic noted "after seeing the film, we hope that the director applies this message in his life by sticking to his core strength of direction rather than dabble in roles that just do not suit him". Another reviewer from Rediff.com stated it was a "brave, real film" and that "Cheran has done a superb job directing as well as acting". After the film's release, Cheran suggested that he regretted not thinking about letting someone else play the lead role instead of himself.

Cheran subsequently chose to prioritise acting commitments in order to raise finances for his subsequent film. He starred in T. V. Chandran's award-winning Aadum Koothu (2008), Karu Pazhaniappan's Pirivom Santhippom (2008) and Raman Thediya Seethai (2009). In his films, he often portrayed meek and mellow roles as a family-orientated man. The films all performed well commercially, and won good reviews for Cheran as an actor. For the fourth time, Cheran finally moved on to make Pokkisham (2009) and cast Padmapriya alongside himself in the lead role during 2008. Set in the 1970s, the story revolved around two lovers – a Muslim Tamil literature student and a Hindu marine engineer working in Calcutta. Pokkisham opened to mixed reviews from critics, with many reviewers calling the screenplay too slow. The film subsequently fared poorly at the box office.

Following the commercial failure of Pokkisham, Cheran actively chose to prioritise acting commitments. He appeared in Mysskin's thriller Yuddham Sei as a detective agent, and in Rajan Madhav's mystery drama Muran during 2011. In 2013, he featured in Vasanth's Moondru Per Moondru Kaadhal and in the anthology film Chennaiyil Oru Naal. In general, all four films won positive reviews from critics and performed well commercially.

=== 2014–present: Career decline as a director ===
Following successive failures as a director, Cheran had trouble attracting producers for his next directorial projects. He also revealed his intentions of making bigger budget films to cater to modern audiences and expressed that village-based films would be difficult, as the setting had changed considerably since the start of his career. He subsequently launched a film titled JK Enum Nanbanin Vaazhkai in 2013 starring Sharwanand and Nithya Menen. However, the film languished in development hell and later had a straight-to-DVD release via Cheran's C2H platform. The period marked a difficult stage for the director, with the lack of directing and acting offers, complemented by family trouble, financial problems owing to C2H, and negative press for controversial statements.

After an extended break, Cheran made a return to direction with the family drama Thirumanam (2019) starring himself alongside Sukanya, Umapathi Ramaiah and Kavya Shetty. The film focused on marriage between young people, and Cheran suggested that the film would urge the youth to consider some of the societal factors before entering into wedlock. The film opened to negative reviews, and fared poorly at the box office. A critic noted "the basic problem with Thirumanam is the preachy tone of the film" and that "Cheran uses lengthy dialogues and songs to convey his thoughts, which often tests our patience", concluding that the film "is certainly not for audiences who like modern dramas".

== Other ventures ==
=== Cinema2Home ===
In 2014, Cheran founded a new cinema distribution platform known as "C2H" (Cinema2Home) in an attempt to curb out copyright infringement in the Tamil film industry. He also launched his own music company 'Dream Sounds' in 2013, which released the soundtrack album of JK Enum Nanbanin Vaazhkai (2015) and Thirumanam Sila Thiruthangaludan (2019). C2H was expected to deliver official original DVDs on the day of a film's theatrical release to homes, for which C2H signed an agreement with DVD maker Moser Baer. Around 150 distributors and 3000 dealers were said to be involved in the process of bringing the DVDs to households across Tamil Nadu. He had chosen to launch the platform after his film JK Enum Nanbanin Vaazhkai failed to attract distributors for a theatrical release and intended on it becoming the first film of the platform. He later convinced producers who were struggling to find distributors to also put their films forward for a C2H release. Other films which joined included Thangasamy's Ettuthikkum Madhayaanai, Rohini's Appavin Meesai, Parthi Bhaskar's Arjunan Kadhali, Sashidharan's Vaaraayo Vennilaave, Mahesh Periyasamy's Hockey and Balan's Koditta Idangalai Nirappuga. Films such as Kandeepan's Aavi Kumar were briefly attached to C2H before opting out.

In March 2015, Cheran released his own film JK Enum Nanbanin Vaazhkai through the platform and opted against giving the film a theatrical release. The C2H initiative was later dropped as the platform did not garner support, and the remainder of the films except Ettuthikkum Madhayaanai remain unreleased. An arrest warrant was issued by a court against Cheran and his daughter Nivedha, after he did not respond to a bounced cheque following the failure of the venture in March 2016.

=== Writing ===
Cheran shared his life experiences and was published as a serial article in the Tamil Weekly Magazine Ananda Vikatan. Later, it was published as a book titled Touring Talkies, ISBN 81-89780-18-2. He later turned publisher with the Tamil novel Porum Valiyum (War & Pain), a novel on an emotional account of a war-torn Sri Lanka by author Savitri Advithanandhan. As a first step, he launched the publishing house "Cheran Noolagam".

=== Bigg Boss ===
In 2019, Cheran entered the third season of the popular reality show Bigg Boss Tamil. He got evicted after 90 days. He also received the "Most Disciplined" housemate award from Kamal Hasan.

== Controversies ==
Cheran has often had a difficult relationship with producers and has made controversial statements, which have elicited discussion. In 1998, he called out Kamal Haasan for ill-treating him during his assistant director days on the sets of Mahanadhi (1994). In 2008, during the audio release of Raman Thediya Seethai, he made a derogatory statement against press for writing rumours about him. In 2013, he held a press conference asking parents to strictly oppose love marriages, despite having written many love stories in films. The conversation arose when he appealed to the media for assistance after his daughter had briefly run away from home with her boyfriend.

In late 2015, prior to the Nadigar Sangam elections, Cheran publicly criticised the leadership potential and acting ability of actors Vishal and Karthi. Cheran criticised actor Sharwanand in July 2016 for not cooperating with the promotion of Rajathi Raja, the Telugu version of JK Enum Nanbanin Vaazhkai (2016). In return, Sharwanand stated that Cheran was in the wrong, was sour because of the failure of the Tamil film and had failed to pay him his salary.

In 2016, Cheran blamed Sri Lankan Tamils for being the cause of video piracy in the Tamil film industry and expressed his regret for his support of their political independence movement. His remarks were met with outrage from the Tamil diaspora.

In March 2017, Cheran launched another scathing attack against Vishal and produced a seven-page letter accusing the actor of being "selfish, power hungry and insensitive". In his letter, Cheran also criticised Vishal for not lending him support during the failed C2H venture. Vishal later suggested that he respected but felt pity for Cheran for his false allegations.

== Personal life ==
Cheran is married to Selvarani and has two daughters, Nivedha Priyadarshini and Damini.

== Filmography ==
=== As director ===
Year	Title	Notes
1997	Bharathi Kannamma	
1997	Porkkaalam	
1998	Desiya Geetham	
2000	Vetri Kodi Kattu	
2001	Pandavar Bhoomi	
2004	Autograph	
2005	Thavamai Thavamirundhu	
2007	Maya Kannadi	
2009	Pokkisham	
2015	JK Enum Nanbanin Vaazhkai	Partially reshot in Telugu as Rajadhi Raja
2019	Thirumanam	
2024	Cheran's Journey	SonyLIV TV series

=== As an actor ===
Year	Title	Role	Notes
1990	Puriyaadha Pudhir	Unknown	Uncredited role
1991	Cheran Pandian	Bus conductor	Uncredited role
1993	Suriyan Chandiran	Bridegroom	Uncredited role
1997	Porkkaalam	Still photographer	Special appearance
2002	Solla Marandha Kadhai	Sivadhanu	
2004	Autograph	Senthil	
2005	Thavamai Thavamirundhu	Ramalingam Muthaiah	
2006	Aadum Koothu	Gnanasekaran	
2007	Maya Kannadi	Kumar	
2008	Pirivom Santhippom	Nadesan	
2008	Raman Thediya Seethai	Venugopal	
2009	Pokkisham	Lenin	
2011	Yuddham Sei	J. Krishnan	
2011	Muran	Nanda	
2013	Chennaiyil Oru Naal	Satyamoorthy	
2013	Moondru Per Moondru Kaadhal	Gunasekar	
2014	Kathai Thiraikathai Vasanam Iyakkam	Himself	Cameo
2019	Thirumanam	Arivudainambi Jr., Arivudainambi Sr.	
2020	Rajavukku Check	Raja	
2021	Anandham Vilayadum Veedu	Muthupandi	
2023	Tamil Kudimagan	Chinnasamy	
2025	Bioscope: The Story of the Story	Himself	Guest appearance
2025	Narivetta	DIG R. Keshavadas IPS	Malayalam Debut

=== As producer ===
Year	Title	Ref.
2004	Autograph	
2006	Azhagai Irukkirai Bayamai Irukkirathu	
2011	Muran	
2015	JK Enum Nanbanin Vaazhkai	

=== As writer ===
Year	Title	Credited as	Notes
Year	Title	Writer	Notes
2006	Thalaimagan	Screenplay	

=== As lyricist ===
Year	Title	Song	Ref.
2004	Autograph	"Ninaivugal"	
2005	Thavamai Thavamirundhu	"Enna Paarkirai"	
2015	JK Enum Nanbanin Vaazhkai	"Who is JK"	
2019	Thirumanam	"Ethanai Kanavu"	
2020	Miga Miga Avasaram	"Pennirku Theemai"	2025 "Nee Enthan Vaanam" Paradox shortfilm https://www.youtube.com/watch?v=DkqXimB5iOg&si=lH7vo_Byats2K9IU

=== Television ===
Year	Title	Role	Channel	Notes
2007	Kana Kaanum Kaalangal	Himself	Vijay TV	
2019	Naalaya Iyakkunar	Judge	Kalaignar TV	
2019	Bigg Boss Tamil 3	Contestant	Vijay TV	Evicted Day 91
2019	Bigg Boss 3 Kondattam	Himself	Vijay TV	Special show
2024	Goli Soda Rising	Thillai	Disney+ Hotstar	
2026–present	Mahanadigai 2	Judge	Zee Tamil	

== Awards and honours ==
=== National Film Awards ===
- 2000– National Film Award for Best Film on Other Social Issues for Vetri Kodi Kattu
- 2004– National Film Award for Best Popular Film Providing Wholesome Entertainment for Autograph
- 2005– National Film Award for Best Film on Family Welfare for Thavamai Thavamirundhu
- 2005– National Film Award for Best Feature Film in Tamil for Aadum Koothu

=== Tamil Nadu State Film Awards ===
- 1997 – Tamil Nadu State Film Award for Best Director for Porkaalam
- 2000 – Tamil Nadu State Film Award for Best Dialogue Writer for Vetri Kodi Kattu
- 2004 – Tamil Nadu State Film Award for Best Film for Autograph
- 2004 – Tamil Nadu State Film Award for Best Director for Autograph
- 2005 – Tamil Nadu State Film Award for Best Film for Thavamai Thavamirundhu
- 2009 – Tamil Nadu State Film Award for Best Story Writer for Pokkisham

=== Filmfare Awards ===
- 1997 – Filmfare Award for Best Director – Tamil for Bharathi Kannamma
- 1998 – Filmfare Award for Best Director – Tamil for Desiya Geetham
- 2001 – Filmfare Award for Best Director – Tamil for Pandavar Bhoomi
- 2004 – Filmfare Award for Best Director – Tamil for Autograph
- 2004 – Filmfare Award for Best Film – Tamil for Autograph

=== Other awards ===
- 2002 – Cinema Express Award for Best Story – Pandavar Bhoomi
- 2004 – Dinakaran-Medimix Awards for Best Film – Autograph
- 2004 – Dinakaran-Medimix Awards for Best Director – Autograph
- 2005 – Tamil Nadu progressive writers association awards for Best Writer Director – Thavamai Thavamirundhu
- 2011 – Jaya TV Award for Best Actor – Yuddham Sei
- 2011 - Norway international Tamil film festival awards - Kalaichigaram Award
