= Perusu =

Perusu means 'Respected brother' in Tamil. It may refer to:

- Perusu (2005 film), Indian Tamil film by GK
- Perusu (2025 film), Indian Tamil film by Ilango Ram
