= Military (film) =

2003 film directed by Suraj

- Poster
- Directed by: G. Saisuresh
- Screenplay by: G. Saisuresh
- Story by: Siddique
- Based on: Hitler by Siddique
- Produced by: S. Siddiq
- Starring: Sathyaraj; Rambha
- Cinematography: D. Sankar
- Edited by: Suresh Rajan
- Music by: Deva
- Production company: Cine Times Entertainment
- Release date: 28 February 2003
- Running time: 142 minutes
- Country: India
- Language: Tamil

Military is a 2003 Indian Tamil-language action drama film directed by Suraj, credited as G. Saisuresh. The film stars Sathyaraj and Rambha. A remake of the Malayalam film Hitler (1996), it was released on 28 February 2003, and became a box office failure.

== Plot ==
Madhavan, locally known as Military, is a protective brother of five younger sisters: Ammu, Seetha, Nandhini, Kamali and Archana. Their father remarried after his first wife's death, and because of that his children do not speak to him. With his second wife, he has two daughters. Ammu, the eldest of Madhavan's sisters, was raped by her widower professor. Madhavan asked Ammu to marry the professor, who was quite old. The other sisters did not know about the matter. Seetha elopes with her cousin Balasubramaniam and they later come to stay in their neighbourhood. Madhavan's enemies try to kill his brother-in-law and put the blame on Madhavan. Luckily, his brother-in-law survives and tells the truth.

== Cast ==
- Sathyaraj as Madhavan (Military)
- Rambha as Lakshmi, Madhavan’s cousin
- Livingston as Balasubramaniam
- Vijayalakshmi as Seetha, Madhavan’s sister
- Manivannan as Madhavan's father
- Vinu Chakravarthy as Sundaramoorthy, Madhavan's uncle
- Nizhalgal Ravi as Professor
- M. S. Bhaskar as Muthu
- Senthil as Aravind Swamy
- Ramesh Khanna as Ganesan
- Dhamu as Azhagesan
- Mayilsamy
- Vaiyapuri
- Halwa Vasu
- Maaran
- Raghavan
- Santhana Bharathi as Velu Nayakar
- Ponnambalam as Velu Nayakar’s brother
- Kazan Khan as Shiva, Velu Nayakar’s brother
- Anju as Velu Nayakar’s wife
- Indhu as Ammu, Madhavan's sister
- Lavanya as Nandhini, Madhavan's sister
- Arunasri as Kamili, Madhavan's sister
- Poorvaja (Karishma) as Archana, Madhavan's sister
- Karpagam as Madhavan's half-sister
- Santhoshi as Madhavan's half-sister
- S. N. Lakshmi as Aishwarya
- K. R. Vatsala as Madhavan's aunt
- S. Lalitha as Velu Nayakar’s wife
- Kovai Senthil as Villager
- Vellai Subbaiah as Villager
- Scissor Manohar as Barber
- Chelladurai as Villager
- Amirthalingam as Villager
- Kovai Babu
- Vijay Ganesh as Shop owner
- Pandiarajan in a guest appearance

== Soundtrack ==
The music was composed by Deva.

Song	Singer(s)	Lyrics	Duration
"Ammamma"	P. Unnikrishnan, Sujatha	Pa. Vijay	5:22
"Chittu Kuruvi"	Harini, Krishnaraj	Na. Muthukumar	5:21
"Mama Mama"	Deva, Sabesh–Murali, Ramji, Sundarrajan	Kalidasan	3:30
"Suriyanae Suriyanae"	Srinivas	Pa. Vijay	5:13
"Therodum Veedhiyilae"	Anuradha Sriram, Srinivas	Palani Bharathi	5:38

== Release and reception ==
Military was released on 28 February 2003. Malini Mannath of Chennai Online felt "the remake fails to live up to the original" and added "while remaking it, the makers seem to have lost out on the feel of the original. It’s like they’ve just borrowed the scenes and situations, and rushed through the whole scenario. The natural flow is missing, leading to jerky narration." Sify wrote the film "fails to live up to the original" and that Sathyaraj "fails to make an impression as the elder brother of five sisters". Visual Dasan of Kalki wrote despite being a sentimental plot about brother and sisters, it sustains the interest till the end due to new kind of scenes and natural humour and also praised the director keeping the flashback short but felt the only negative is antics of Vinu Chakravarthy and Ponnambalam and concluded the director deserves military salute for making a film which can be watched with families. IndiaInfo wrote "Except Satyaraj’s performance, the film has nothing much to rave about".
