= Milaga =

- Directed by: Ravi Mariya
- Written by: Ravi Mariya
- Produced by: Shyamsundar; Sujit Sarkar
- Starring: Natty Subramaniam; Poongodi
- Cinematography: Balajee V. Rangha
- Edited by: S. N. Fazil
- Music by: Sabesh–Murali
- Production company: Shri Nataraja Arts
- Distributed by: V. Creations
- Release date: 25 June 2010
- Country: India
- Language: Tamil

Milaga (transl. Chilli) is a 2010 Indian Tamil-language action comedy film written and directed by Ravi Mariya, who also starred in the film. The film stars Natty Subramaniam, Poongodi, and Suja Varunee, while Ilavarasu, G. M. Kumar, Singampuli, and K. P. Jagannath play supporting roles. The music was composed by Sabesh-Murali with cinematography by Balajee V. Rangha and editing by S. N. Fazil. The film was released on 25 June 2010.

== Plot ==
Years ago, Gajendra, the youngest brother, stabbed a judge to manipulate the case's outcome and secure the release of his three elder brothers. Moved by Gajendra's selfless act, the brothers rebrand themselves as the Gajendra brothers while Gajendra is sentenced to 10 years in prison for the stabbing. Currently, the Gajendra brothers have evolved into notorious gangsters, feared throughout Madurai. Thenmozhi, a teenage girl, finds herself trapped in their house, unable to escape due to their constant surveillance. Desperate for help, she resorts to writing pleas for assistance on ₹50 notes and scattering them in various locations. However, her plan is soon discovered, and she is caught, rendering her efforts futile.

Azhagar and his friends team up to help their friend Eswaran, who is struggling to recover ₹18.50 lakhs from debtors who have attacked him and refuse to repay. When Vaazhaithoppu Maari, a gangster with a significant debt of ₹1.75 lakhs, refuses to pay, Azhagar chops off his thumb, knowing that Maari's diabetes will make the injury severe. Maari, humiliated, sends goons after Azhagar but ultimately repays the loan to avoid further trouble. As word spreads about Azhagar's fearlessness, other debtors begin to repay Eswaran out of fear. Eswaran's landlord, Sowmiya, develops feelings for Azhagar, but he remains playful and does not reciprocate her love. Thenmozhi witnesses Azhagar effortlessly taking down goons and believes he can help her escape from the Gajendra brothers' clutches. She mistakenly assumes that the Gajendra brothers fear Mookkaiyya, an elderly gangster they respect. Knowing Azhagar is acquainted with Mookkaiyya, Thenmozhi tries to convey her situation to Azhagar, but fails. To get Azhagar's attention, Thenmozhi pretends that Azhagar is harassing her, prompting the Gajendra brothers to send henchmen after him.

However, Azhagar subdues them and confronts the brothers. When Azhagar denies any involvement with Thenmozhi, Rajendran beats her, realizing it was a ruse. Suspecting something is amiss and aware that Azhagar has seen the ₹50 note with Thenmozhi's plea for help, Azhagar decides to save her by challenging the Gajendra brothers that he will marry Thenmozhi. Azhagar secretly meets her and learns about her past. She recounts visiting the Chatrapatti temple festival, where she slapped Gajendra after he pinched her waist. Humiliated, Gajendra tried to abduct her, but she escaped. During the chase, Gajendra was hit by a speeding car driven by his brothers, leaving him mentally unstable. The Gajendra brothers then hold Thenmozhi captive in their home to marry her to Gajendra once he recovers. However, Azhagar realizes that he was the one who playfully pinched Thenmozhi's waist, not Gajendra. Unbeknownst to Thenmozhi, her slap led to her current predicament. Determined to set things right, Azhagar decides to rescue Thenmozhi from the Gajendra brothers' clutches.

First, Azhagar and his friends embark on a mission to locate Thenmozhi's parents, who are being held captive by the brothers. Meanwhile, the Gajendra brothers send their henchmen to abduct Azhagar's father and grandmother in Alanganallur. However, his grandmother's quick wit enables them to tactically escape and find safety in Courtallam. In Theni, Azhagar's friends are captured by the Gajendra brothers, who subject them to torture to reveal Azhagar's whereabouts. Azhagar pretends to be unconcerned about his friends' safety, which convinces Rajendran to spare them. Maari spots Azhagar at a hospital and informs the Gajendra brothers, who send their goons to attack him. After an intense battle, Azhagar is captured, but his friends create a diversion using fire extinguisher smoke, allowing them to safeguard him. After a few days of hospitalization, Azhagar sneaks into Rajendra's house, meets Thenmozhi, and they confess their love for each other.

The Gajendra brothers break into Eswaran's house, suspecting Azhagar's presence, but they manage to escape just in time. Seeking protection, they turn to Mookkaiyya, who agrees to mediate with the Gajendra brothers. However, the brothers kill Mookkaiyya, whom they had previously respected, in their quest for Gajendra. Azhagar devises a plan to rescue Thenmozhi by pretending to accept marrying the mentally unstable Gajendra. As part of the ruse, she asks the Gajendra brothers to bring her parents, whom they have been holding captive. The brothers, though suspicious, agree to the plan and arrange for the marriage. Coincidentally, Azhagar's father and grandmother arrive at the marriage venue. Before the ceremony, Thenmozhi's parents also arrive, and Azhagar and his friends, who have been hiding in a nearby flower shop, launch an attack on the Gajendra brothers' henchmen. They all escape in a car, but the Gajendra brothers catch up to them. An intense fight ensues, and Azhagar manages to overpower the brothers. However, due to the car accident, Gajendra's mental illness is cured, and he fiercely attacks Azhagar and his friends, but Azhagar subdues him.

Just as Azhagar is about to deliver the final blow, the Gajendra brothers plead for mercy. Azhagar spares their lives, but before they can leave, Mookkaiyya's henchmen avenge their boss's death by killing the Gajendra brothers. The film concludes with Azhagar married to Thenmozhi, who finally understands that her husband was the one who had pinched her waist, setting off the chain of events that led to their tumultuous journey together.

== Cast ==
- Natty Subramaniam as Azhagar
- Poongodi as Thenmozhi
- Suja Varunee as Sowmiya
- Maushmi Udeshi in a special appearance as a dancer in the song "Enga Vandhadi"
- Ilavarasu as Vaazhaithoppu Maari
- G. M. Kumar as Azhagar's father
- Singampuli as Paruthi, Azhagar's friend
- K. P. Jagannath as Eswaran, Azhagar's friend
- Mayi Sundar as Pasai, Azhagar's friend
- Ravi Mariya as Gajendra
- Rajendran as Rajendra, Gajendra's brother
- P. S. Sridhar as Mahendra, Gajendra's brother
- Ainthu Kovilan as a gambler
- Karate Venkatesan as Mookkaiyya, senior gangster
- Meera Krishnan as Thenmozhi's mother
- Vela Ramamoorthy as Thenmozhi's father
- Janaki Devi as Eswaran's sister
- Cumbum Meena as a flower vendor

== Production ==
Set in Madurai, the film has cinematographer-turned-actor Natty Subramaniam in the lead role, directed by Ravi Mariya, starring Suja Varunee, who was chosen after an audition to portray the second female lead. Poongodi of Mayandi Kudumbathar (2009) fame was chosen as the female lead, while the film's music is composed by Sabesh–Murali and editing done by V. Jaisankar. The film is produced by Shyamsundar and Sujit Sarkar under their Shri Nataraja Arts banner.

== Soundtrack ==
Soundtrack was composed by Sabesh–Murali.

- "Thavaniyellam" - Balaji
- "Nee Sirichupaakura" - Krishnaraj, Ganga
- "Kirukku Paiya" - Sathyan, Prashanthini
- "Enga Vandhadi" - Janani, Vineeth, Geetha
- "Samy Vandhuruchu" - Sriram, Sabesh

== Release and reception ==
Milaga released in theatres on 25 June 2010 by Kalaipuli S. Thanu through his V Creations distribution house.

Sify wrote "first half of the film moves at a rapid pace [...] it is the predictable second half of the film which hampers the pace". Pavithra Srinivasan of Rediff.com wrote that the "movie doesn't quite capitalise on strengths". Chennai Vision wrote, "Milaga has got nothing new to offer. At the same time, the film will make you sit and comfortably watch it for two hours and thirty minutes, thanks to a gripping narration by director Ravi Maria".
