= Kadalora Kavithaigal =

1986 film by Bharathiraja

- Poster
- Directed by: Bharathiraja
- Written by: R. Selvaraj (dialogues)
- Screenplay by: Bharathiraja
- Story by: K. Somasundreshwar
- Produced by: Ve Vaduganathan; C. Natesan
- Starring: Sathyaraj; Rekha
- Cinematography: B. Kannan
- Edited by: T. Thirunavukkarasu
- Music by: Ilaiyaraaja
- Production company: Mookambika Art Creations
- Release date: 5 July 1986
- Country: India
- Language: Tamil

Kadalora Kavithaigal (transl. Verses at the Seashore) is a 1986 Indian Tamil-language romantic drama film directed by Bharathiraja. The film stars Sathyaraj and Rekha, with Raja, Janagaraj and Kamala Kamesh in supporting roles. It is about transformation of a ruffian, who has a prison record and his understanding of love through an elementary education. In that process, he falls in love with the school teacher.

Kadalora Kavithaigal was the debut film for Rekha and Raja. It was primarily shot in Muttom, Kanyakumari. The film was released on 5 July 1986, and was remade twice in Telugu as Aradhana (1987) and Kauravudu (2000) and in Kannada as Kowrava (1998).

== Plot ==
In Muttom, Kanyakumari, Chinnappa Das is a ruffian who has a criminal record and returns to his village after serving his prison term. He is persuaded by his maternal uncle's daughter Gangamma to marry him. In one of his encounters at an elementary school, he meets a lady school teacher Jennifer who gives a sound scolding on how ignorant fools behave.

There is an element of purity in Das's heart which the school teacher could identify, this transforms his life forever. Set in a coastal milieu, the duo often meet on the beach, amidst sunlit sea and splashing waves on the rocks. In a sequence, Das makes the teacher stand alone atop a seaside hillock, Das from down below on the sands announces aloud to her that "you are my God". Eventually teacher developed feelings for Das but those on the other side of the teacher's family want her to marry an acquaintance of her family which would lead to a drama of emotions

== Cast ==
- Sathyaraj as Chinnappa Das
- Rekha as Jennifer
- Raja as Lawrence
- Anuradha Vasudev as Josephine
- Ranjini as Gangamma
- Janagaraj
- Kamala Kamesh as Thayamma
- Lalitha Sharma
- Ilavarasu as Chinnappa Das' friend

== Production ==
Kadalora Kavithaigal is the debut for Raja and Rekha as actors. The film had Sathyaraj deviating from the negative roles he was previously known for. The film was produced by Bharathiraja's friends Vaduganathan and Natesan. It was primarily shot in Muttom, Kanyakumari. Actor Kanakarajsamy worked as an electrician for the film's outdoor unit.

== Soundtrack ==
The music was composed by Ilaiyaraaja. The song "Adi Aathadi" is set in the Carnatic raga known as Shivaranjani, "Poguthe Poguthe" is set in Pahadi, and "Kodiyile Malliyapoo" is set in Natabhairavi. "Adi Aathadi" was partially adapted as "Aa Jaana Tere Bin", composed by Anand–Milind for Bol Radha Bol (1992). "Adi Aathadi" was remixed by Sabesh–Murali for the film Mittai (2011).

Song	Singers	Lyrics	Length
"Adi Aathadi" (Sad)	Malaysia Vasudevan, S. Janaki	Vairamuthu	03:42
"Adi Aathadi"	Ilaiyaraaja, S. Janaki	Vairamuthu	04:39
"Das Das Chinnappadas"	Ilaiyaraaja	Ilaiyaraaja	03:00
"Kodiyile Malliyapoo"	P. Jayachandran, S. Janaki	Vairamuthu	04:21
"Podinadaya Poravare"	K. S. Chithra	Gangai Amaran	05:23
"Poguthae Poguthae"	S. P. Balasubrahmanyam	Vairamuthu	04:34
"Poguthae Poguthae"	S. P. Balasubrahmanyam, S. Janaki	Vairamuthu	02:57

== Release and reception ==
Kadalora Kavithaigal was released on 5 July 1986. Jayamanmadhan of Kalki said that while the sea in the film's title was breathtaking, the poem in the title was incomplete. Rekha won the Cinema Express Award for Best New Face Actress.

== Bibliography ==
- Sundararaman (2007) [2005]. Raga Chintamani: A Guide to Carnatic Ragas Through Tamil Film Music (2nd ed.). Chennai: Pichhamal Chintamani. OCLC 295034757.
