= Vatsan Chakravarthy =

Indian actor

- Born: 27 November; Pudhukottai
- Occupation: Actor
- Years active: 2010-present

Vatsan Chakravarthy is an Indian actor, who has appeared in Tamil language films. He has appeared in films including Engaeyum Eppothum (2011) and Tharkappu (2016).

== Career ==
Vatsan debuted as an actor with Aridhu Aridhu (2010), before working on AR Murugadoss's production Engaeyum Eppothum (2011), in which he portrayed a bus passenger who falls in love with a fellow traveller. He subsequently appeared in Rasu Madhuravan's Pandi Oliperukki Nilayam (2012) and in another Murugadoss production, Vathikuchi (2013), where he portrayed a negative role. He played his first lead role in R. K. Kalaimani's Apple Penne (2013), where he worked with actresses Iswarya Menon and Roja. The film had a low key release and received negative reviews from critics. In mid-2013, he also worked on a single track titled "Thalapathy Anthem", which he dedicated to actor Vijay.

Vatsan was absent from the film industry throughout 2014, after suffering from dengue fever. His next release was Ravi's Tharkappu (2016), where he appeared alongside Shakthi Vasudevan and Samuthirakani.

He had four releases in 2019 including his Telugu debut: Kalavu with Kalaiyarasan and Lokesh Kanagaraj's Kaithi followed by Nikhil's Arjun Suravaram. To prepare for the role as the antagonist in the Atharvaa-starrer Kuruthi Aattam, Vatsan gained 20 kilos. The film opened to mixed reviews, and critics praised Vatsan for his appeal and screen presence he was nominated for best villain in across various major award ceremonies .

== Filmography ==
List of Vatsan Chakravarthy film credits
Year	Film	Role	Notes
2010	Aridhu Aridhu	Unknown	Uncredited
2011	Engaeyum Eppothum	Ramesh	
2012	Pandi Oliperukki Nilayam	Siluva	
2013	Vathikuchi	Praveen	
2013	Apple Penne	James	
2016	Tharkappu	Vino	
2016	Chennai 600028 II: Second Innings	Cheenu	
2017	Ticket	Craig	
2019	Kalavu	Stephen	
2019	Chithiram Pesuthadi 2		
2019	Kaithi	Ajay	
2019	Arjun Suravaram	Siri	Telugu film
2022	Kuruthi Aattam	Sethu	
2024	Kanguva	Thumban	
