= Kadhal Pisase =

2012 Indian film by Aravind

- Poster
- Directed by: Aravind Ratnasingam
- Written by: S. Thangavel
- Produced by: Aravind Ratnasingam; Ravi Gunasingam
- Starring: Aravind Ratnasingam; Mithuna; Santhanam
- Cinematography: Paul Livingstone
- Edited by: Sudha
- Music by: Brunthan; Sabesh–Murali (background score)
- Production companies: Toronto Talkies Private Ltd. Dream Art Creations
- Release date: 23 March 2012
- Running time: 135 minutes
- Country: India
- Language: Tamil

Kadhal Pisase (transl. Love ghost) is a 2012 Indian Tamil-language romantic drama film directed and co-produced by Aravind Ratnasingam, who also plays the lead role, alongside Mithuna.

== Cast ==
- Aravind Ratnasingam as Arun
- Mithuna as Vasantha
- Santhanam as R. Srinath
- Vanitha Krishnachandran as Ranganayaki, Arun's mother
- Santhana Bharathi as Vasantha's father
- Anitha Reddy as Vasantha's mother
- Bhuvana
- Vidya
- Cool Suresh as College Rowdy
- Kottachi as Srinath's friend
- Ambani Shankar as Srinath's friend
- Sankara Narayanan
- Lollu Sabha Easter as Principal

== Production ==
S. Thangavel, an associate of K. S. Ravikumar, approached Aravind Ratnasingam, a graduate of the Toronto Film School who starred in the Canadian Tamil film Adhikalai 26, with a one-liner of the story. Aravind, who was impressed with the story, agreed to direct, co-produce alongside his friend Ravi Gunasingam and act in the film.

== Soundtrack ==
All songs were composed by Brunthan.

Song title	Lyricist	Singers
"Swasamai"	Srivijay	Harish Raghavendra, Kanthini
"Ivan Ivan"	Srivijay	Mukesh Mohamed
"Yuthangal Seiyathey"	Srivijay	Roshini
"Engiruntho"	Srivijay	Haricharan
"Idhayame"	Raghavan Yogaratnam	Kavitha Jayaraman
"Gank Star"	Sabesh–Murali	Aravind, Sabesh–Murali

== Reception ==
The Times of India gave this film a 1 out of 5 stars. The reviewer wrote that "Director Aravind (who also plays the lead) is said to have learnt acting from the Toronto Film Institute. From what unfolds on screen, we are forced to think that he needs to repeat his courses there".
