= Super Kudumbam =

- VCD cover
- Directed by: R. K. Kalaimani
- Story by: P. Kalaimani
- Produced by: T. S. Meenakshi
- Starring: Prabhu; Roja; Alex; Vivek; Pratyusha
- Cinematography: K. S. Selvaraj
- Edited by: V. Uthayashankaran
- Music by: Adithyan
- Production company: Sri Rajalakshmi Films
- Release date: 27 July 2001
- Country: India
- Language: Tamil

Super Kudumbam (transl. Superb Family) is a 2001 Indian Tamil-language comedy film directed by R. K. Kalaimani, starring Prabhu, Roja, Alex, Pratyusha, Vinu Chakravarthy, and Vivek. The music is composed by Adithyan.

== Plot ==
Arun (Prabhu) and Hari (Vivek) are close friends and bank employees. Abhirami (Prathyusha) sincerely and secretly loves Arun and lives in the opposite mansion of Arun for a long time. She always communicates with him through phone and monitors each and every day life of Arun with love. One fine day after much request from Arun she accepts to meet him finally to reciprocate her love for him. Shanthi (Roja) who is a pickpocket steals Abhirami's scooter and accidentally comes across Arun. Arun thinking she is Abhirami even helps her financially when conned unknowingly. That night Abhirami calls him to apologise for not able to come for the meet due to her scooter got stolen. Arun insults her for lying and blames her for conning him to give money. Deeply saddened and heartbroken Abhirami come to Arun's mansion and reveals herself. Shocked to see the real Abhirami he tries to apologize and also to convince her how sorry he feels but she tearfully goes away. Now Hari falls in love with a tomboyish retired military major's daughter Sowmiya who got impressed by his normal open minded nature. To get a rent house in that Military Major's Mansion Hari makes Arun and Shanthi act as husband and wife and also to impress the father of Hari's lover, who supports inter-caste marriage. After Sowmiya's father proposes marriage between Hari and his daughter when tricked they arrange a grand engagement at Major's Mansion. After accidentally getting drunk at the party, thinking it is Abirami, Arun rapes Shanthi. Due to this she becomes pregnant which is revealed during the marriage of Hari. Shanthi's uncle who is a rogue and also a womaniser wants to have sex with her before she attempts suicide which she angrily rejects. When Arun comes to convince Shanthi to get married with him. Her uncle brutally attacks him but Arun thrashes them once and for all. Shanthi attempts suicide lighting herself on fire but Arun saves her in time. They both reconcile, he accepts Shanthi along with her sister's children whom she foster cares. Abhirami is happy to see them united.

== Cast ==
- Prabhu as Arun
- Vivek as Hari
- Prathyusha as Abhirami
- Roja as Shanthi
- Parimala as Soumya
- Vinu Chakravarthy as Major Malaisamy
- Pandu as Major's secretary
- Alex
- Gowthami Vembunathan

== Soundtrack ==
Music was composed by Adhityan.

Song	Singers	Lyrics
"Vittu Vittu"	P. Unnikrishnan, Sujatha	Kalaikumar
"Millenium Figuregalae"	Krishnaraj	Vivek
"Yenthen Selaiyum"	Harini, Srinivas	Piraisoodan
"Uyirae En Uyirai"	Swarnalatha	Piraisoodan
"Sri Rangantha"	Swarnalatha, S. Balamurugan	Muthulingam

== Reception ==
Malini Mannath of Chennai Online opined that "With a bad script, there is nothing much the two heroines can do to lift it up".
