= Vaada (2010 film) =

- Theatrical release poster
- Directed by: A. Venkatesh
- Written by: A. Venkatesh; Pattukkottai Prabakar
- Produced by: M. R. Mohan Ratha
- Starring: Sundar C; Sheryll Brindo; Vivek
- Cinematography: K. S. Selvaraj
- Edited by: V. T. Vijayan
- Music by: D. Imman
- Distributed by: Screen Play Entertainment Ptd. Ltd.
- Release date: 15 October 2010
- Country: India
- Language: Tamil

Vaada (transl. Come dude!) is a 2010 Indian Tamil-language action film directed by A. Venkatesh. The film featured Sundar C, Sheryll Brindo and Vivek. The film was released after several postponements on 15 October 2010.

== Plot ==
Singamuthu aka Singam is a person who lives as a temporary driver in Rishikesh, Uttranchal. Annamalai is the owner of Annamalai Transports but not the building-cum-residence of the transports and the staff. He is very innocent and funny. Annamalai always arranges a marriage bride for himself but in one way or another Singam stops the marriage. Anjali is an ardent fan of MGR and she feels her husband should also be like him. She is the very beautiful and attractive daughter of the Annamalai Transport building owner and she comes to Rishikesh to check the building's condition and to collect the yearly rent. She meets Singamuthu. and falls in love. Singamuthu also falls in love with Anjali and reveals his past to her. Singamuthu by the real name Vetrivel was a highly accomplished district collector and was transferred to Tanjore. He gets himself in a cat-and-mouse chase with local goon Naachiyaar. Naachiyaar's son kidnaps Vetrivel's friend's sister, who was engaged to another man, and tries to rape her. Vetrivel comes in and saves the girl and destroys Naachiyaar's son's reproductive capacity. Naachiyaar's son dies in hospital. The marriage of the girl happens happily. Naachiyaar kills Vetrivel's friend brutally for revenge. Then the governor comes to Tanjore and CBCID informs that an attempt will be made on governor's life at a Tanjore meeting. Vetrivel is told to protect the governor as he trained for IPS first and was an excellent shooter. However, the governor is killed and Vetrivel is framed by the DGP himself. The rest of the film shows how Vetrivel proves himself and again stops another marriage of Annamalai after returning to being a collector.

== Cast ==
- Sundar C as Vetrivel IAS (Singamuthu)
- Sheryll Brindo as Anjali
- Vivek as Annamalai, Owner of Annamalai travels
- Prem as Prem
- Akila as Vetrivel's sister
- Krishna as Muthu
- Deepa Venkat as Prem's wife
- Raj Kapoor as Minister Vanangamudi
- Pandu as Vanangamudi's PA
- Thambi Ramaiah
- Lollu Sabha Manohar as Annamalai travels worker
- O. A. K. Sundar as Khedar Pandey
- Thalapathy Dinesh as Dinesh
- Rajyalakshmi as Prem's mother-in-law
- Bonda Mani as Annamalai travels worker
- Scissor Manohar as Ward boy
- S. N. Lakshmi
- Cell Murugan as Annamalai's kidnapper
- Khushbu (special appearance in the song "Adi Yennadi Raakkamma")

== Production ==
Prem plays a police officer for the third time in this film after Nepali (2008) and Unnaipol Oruvan (2009). His character is the brother-in-law of Sundar C's character. The film was shot in Alleppey, Goa, Hrishikesh, Tuticorin amongst other places. During filming near Hrishikesh, O. A. K. Sundar, who plays the film's antagonist, was briefly detained by authorities mistaking him for Osama Bin Laden due to his getup.

== Soundtrack ==
The soundtrack was composed by D. Imman and was released on Saregama. It includes a remixed version of the song "Adi Yennadi Raakkamma" from the 1972 film Pattikada Pattanama, composed by M. S. Viswanathan.

Track listing
| No. | Title | Lyrics | Singer(s) | Length |
|---|---|---|---|---|
| 1. | "Mesmerism Seyyum" | Kalai Kumar | Naresh Iyer, Shweta Pandit | 4:16 |
| 2. | "Adi Yennadi Raakkamma" (Remix) | Tabu Shankar | Benny Dayal | 4:31 |
| 3. | "Punagayal Yennai" | Kalai Kumar | Ravi | 4:16 |
| 4. | "Kinguda Kinguda" | Tabu Shankar | Karthik | 4:31 |
| 5. | "Agginikunjondru" | Subramania Bharati | M. L. R. Karthikeyan | 3:30 |
| 6. | "Therupuzhidi" | Kalai Kumar | Shankar–Ganesh, Gk. Lavanya | 3:56 |
| Total length: | | | | 25:00 |

== Release ==
Vaada was initially planned to release on 16 April 2010 after being completed in December 2009 but was delayed. The film was eventually released on 15 October 2010, a crowded window with several other low budget films. Despite this, it ran for over 25 days in theatres and was still running as of November 2026.
