= Mittai =

- Directed by: M. S. Anbu
- Written by: M. S. Anbu
- Produced by: A. Lalitha; A. Sivaguru
- Starring: Santhosh; Prabha; Unni Maya
- Cinematography: Naga Krishnan
- Edited by: Rajkeerthy
- Music by: Sabesh–Murali
- Production company: B Team Players
- Release date: 19 August 2011
- Running time: 145 minutes
- Country: India
- Language: Tamil

Mittai (transl. Candy) is a 2011 Indian Tamil-language romantic drama film directed by M. S. Anbu. The film stars Santhosh, Prabha and Unni Maya, with Vijayakumar, Mahanadi Shankar, A. C. Murali Mohan, Bharathi, Boys Rajan, Meera Krishnan, Singamuthu, Nellai Siva, Swaminathan and Chaams playing supporting roles. The film had musical score by Sabesh–Murali and was released on 19 August 2011.

== Plot ==
Surya and Arun are best friends and students living in a college hostel in Chennai. Arun is from a wealthy family while Surya is from a poor family. Surya is known for being a bad student and often gets into trouble. Arun then bumps into Pooja in different situations and they fall in love. In the meantime, Surya starts receiving love letters and gifts from a person called Pavithra and he starts looking for her. In the letters, Pavithra convinces Surya of becoming a good student. Surya then changes his behaviour, studies hard and passes the exam. Surya becomes frustrated that he cannot meet Pavithra. One day, he receives a letter and a parcel from her. In the letter, she tells him to forget her and in the parcel, Surya finds a statue. Surya remembers about an incident that happened a few months ago: Surya wanted to buy the statue in a shop but it was already reserved by a woman. Surya believes that the woman is Pavithra and takes his friends with him to find her. Surya then introduces Pooja to his friends as Pavithra, leaving his friend Arun aghast.

Arun and Pooja have an argument over the issue and Arun tells her the truth. A few months ago, Surya's father begs Arun to change Surya into a good student and he promised him to do so. Surya being stubborn, Arun cannot convince him of studying hard. Arun believed that only love can convince Surya of doing so and he created the character of Pavithra. Arun was the one who wrote the love letters and his plan worked perfectly but his only mistake was to give Surya the statue: a gift bought by his girlfriend Pooja. Arun doesn't want to unveil the truth to Surya and asks Pooja to hide too. Surya shows possessive attitude towards Pooja and he is madly in love with her, thus making Arun uncomfortable. The matter escalates and Surya becomes engaged to Pooja. When Surya learns of their love, he is angered.

Thereafter, Surya asks Pooja to come to the registrar office. There, Surya apologises to Pooja and he marries another woman. Meanwhile, Arun comes to the registrar office with his parents and his newlywed wife. Pooja surprisingly accepts her faith and praises them to have sacrificed their love for their friendship.

== Cast ==
- Santhosh as Surya
- Prabha as Arun
- Unni Maya as Pooja
- Vijayakumar as Surya's father
- Mahanadi Shankar as Traffic police
- A. C. Murali Mohan as Arun's father
- Bharathi as Arun's mother
- Boys Rajan as Pooja's father
- Meera Krishnan as Pooja's mother
- Singamuthu as Vanangamudi
- Nellai Siva as Nithish's father
- Swaminathan as Pulikesi
- Chaams as Nithish (Nethili Karuppan)
- Poochi Senthil as Surya and Arun's friend
- Vipin as Surya and Arun's friend
- Thamizh as Surya and Arun's friend

== Production ==
After directing the film Prathi Gnayiru 9 Manimudhal 10.30 Varai (2006), M. S. Anbu started his new project Mittai in 2008 under the banner of B Team Players. Kadhal Seiya Virumbu fame Santhosh, Pirappu fame Prabha and Unni Maya were chosen to play the lead roles. The poster of the film showing the heroine marrying both the heroes had stirred a controversy. The poster had evoked protests and the film director M. S. Anbu received murders treats. Speaking about the controversy, the film director said, "The poster had my heroine striking a pose with the heroes in wedding costume. While some people praised me for the concept, some others from certain organisations felt offended. These people felt that a girl getting married to two people is against Tamil culture. But I told them it was inappropriate to come to a conclusion without even seeing the film".

== Soundtrack ==
The soundtrack was composed by Sabesh–Murali. The soundtrack, released in 2008, features six tracks. The soundtrack contained the remix of the song "Adi Aathadi" from Kadalora Kavithaigal (1986).

All lyrics are written by M. S. Anbu.

Track list
No.	Title	Singer(s)	Length
1.	"Aasaipadu"	Benny Dayal	5:47
2.	"Adi Aathadi"	Sunilkumar, Jayadev, Sabesh	4:51
3.	"Azhagaana"	Krishnaraj	3:08
4.	"Devadhaiye"	Prasanna, Vinaitha	5:39
5.	"Katraipola"	Timmy	4:04
6.	"Mittai Pennay"	MK Balaji, Reshmi	6:01
Total length:			29:30

== Reception ==
Kungumam praised the performance of the lead actors and the film climax.
