= Krishnaraj (singer) =

Indian playback singer (1951–2026)

- Born: Krishnaraj Ramasamy; 25 December 1951; Salem, Madras State, India
- Died: 22 October 2026 (aged 74) Chennai, Tamil Nadu, India
- Genres: Indian folk, Devotional
- Occupations: Playback singer, assistant music director

Krishnaraj Ramasamy (25 December 1951 – 22 October 2026) was an Indian playback singer and a former assistant music director. He sang over 3000 songs, of which over 300 were for the Tamil film industry.

== Life and career ==
Krishnaraj was born on 25 December 1951 in Vembadithalam village in Salem district, to Varadhammal and A. Ramasamy, with a background in weaving industry. His parents were musically literate. Two of his five older brothers were involved in the music industry. He completed his secondary schooling in Vempaditalam in 1971. After that, he was involved in weaving for 10 years. During this period, he learned to sing songs and play musical instruments based on self-acquired knowledge through listening. He worked as a member of the Salem Soundar Drama Group. During the flower exhibition at Yercaud, he participated in singing contest and received first prize from composer V. Kumar, which led to his interest to sing in films.

In 1984, he received the Sangeetha Vidwan, Best Student Award from the music college, which was presented by the then Tamil Nadu Chief Minister M. G. Ramachandran. In the same year, he worked as an assistant to music composer R. Ramanujan for an unreleased film Arah. He sang songs for other composers at Hindu and Christian religious events. He also started looking for film opportunities. He worked as track singer for music director Deva. He recorded his first song "Unna Naan Thottathukku" from an unreleased film Adhikaalai Subhavelai for Deva.

Krishnaraj gained attention for the song "Vellarikka Pinchu Vellarikka" in the film Kadhal Kottai (1996). He won the Tamil Nadu State Film Award for Best Playback Singer for the song "Thanjavuru Mannu Eduthu" in the film Porkkaalam. He also received a direct compliment from former President of Singapore Sellapan Rama Nathan for this song. The song was played at Rama Nathan's funeral in 2016.

Krishnaraj died on 22 October 2026, at the age of 74. His wife Mohanambal died in 2003. They are survived by two daughters Jeevarekha and Geethapriya.

== Notable discography ==
Year	Song title	Film	Music director	Notes
1990	"Paalam Paalam"	Paalam	N. S. T. Rajesh	
1992	"Tamilnaattu Thaikulame"	Brahmachari	Deva	
1994	"Kadhal Kasanthidumo"	Subramaniya Swamy	Deva	
1994	"Rukku Rukku"	Ilaignar Ani	Deva	
1994	"Elumicham Pazham"	Killadi Mappillai	Deva	
1995	"Chinnanchiru" (male)	Dear Son Maruthu	Deva	
1995	"Namma Ooru Thottathile"	Karuppu Nila	Deva	
1995	"Marumagane"	Deva	Deva	
1995	"Vanthathu Oru Sundari"	Chinna Mani	Deva	
1996	"Velarikka Pinju Vellarika", "Nalam Nalamariya" (2nd version)	Kadhal Kottai	Deva	
1996	"Rendu Kannu"	Tamizh Selvan	Deva	
1996	"Aana Aavanna", "Chinnavale", "Oru Pakkam Then"	Panchalankurichi	Deva	
1996	"Athai Sutta", "Rasa Unne Ravikkayin"	Veettukulle Thiruvizha	Deva	
1996	"Nallavanga Kaalam", "Anna Sonnaru"	Thirumbi Paar	Deva	
1997	"Oorukulla"	Dharma Chakkaram	Deva	
1997	"Aavaram Poovu"	Periya Thambi	Deva	
1997	"Babilona"	Kaalamellam Kadhal Vaazhga	Deva	
1997	"Kuyil Paattu"	Vaimaye Vellum	Deva	
1997	"Chinna Kanangkuruvi", "Thanjavooru Mannu Eduthu"	Porkkaalam	Deva	Won—Tamil Nadu State Film Award for Best Male Playback Singer; Won—Cinema Express Award for Best Playback Singer (Male)
1997	"Neelavaanam"	Mappillai Gounder	Deva	
1997	"Nagumo" (2nd version)	Arunachalam	Deva	His version used only in the film
1997	"B.Sc. Aynagani"	Master	Deva	Telugu song
1997	"Idhayam Idhayam", "Kidaichuruchu"	Vidukathai	Deva	
1997	"Gummunu Irukkalam", "Idlikku Maavu"	Rettai Jadai Vayasu	Deva	
1998	"Meesakara Nanba" (sad version), "Garuda Garuda"	Natpukkaga	Deva	
1998	"Kondaiyil"	Santhosham	Deva	
1998	"Vaigai Vellam"	Vaettiya Madichu Kattu	Deva	
1998	"Ennadi Nee", "Hey Panjara"	En Aasai Rasave	Deva	
1998	"Chinna Chinna Kiliye" (2nd version)	Kannedhirey Thondrinal	Deva	
1998	"Manisha Manisha"	Ninaithen Vandhai	Deva	
1998	"Annakili Vannakili", "Kannerukku Kaasu"	Iniyavale	Deva	
1998	"Namma Meena"	Sandhippoma	Deva	
1998	"Emi Sodhara"	Tholi Prema	Deva	Telugu song; also sang the Tamil version "Enna Aachu Da"
1998	"January Nilave"	En Uyir Neethaane	Deva	
1998	"Karumegam Mazhaiyatchu"	Urimai Por	Deva	
1998	"Podu Jeans", "Parvai Parvai"	Guru Paarvai	Deva	
1998	"Sokku Sundari"	Moovendhar	Sirpy	
1999	"Aaya Onnu", "Thirupathi Ezhumalai Venkatesa", "Kathadikkuthu Kathadikkuthu"	Ninaivirukkum Varai	Deva	
1999	"Paattukku Paalaivanam"	Anandha Poongatre	Deva	
1999	"Thaaye Thirisooli"	Simmarasi	S. A. Rajkumar	
1999	"Eechi Elemichhi"	Taj Mahal	A. R. Rahman	
2000	"Endhan Uyire"	Unnaruge Naan Irundhal	Deva	
2000	"Thangachi En"	Rajakali Amman	S. A. Rajkumar	
2000	"Kalaiyile"	Veeranadai	Deva	
2000	"Naan Salt Kotta"	Pennin Manathai Thottu	S. A. Rajkumar	
2000	"Thottachinungi Pola"	Kannaal Pesavaa	Deva	
2000	"Mannuku Nammathan"	Puratchikkaaran	Vidyasagar	
2001	"No Problem", "Ma Thujhe Salam", "Thayya Thakka Tha"	Vande Matharam	Deva	Kannada songs
2001	"Missu Missu Pappa"	Looty	Deva	
2001	"Vaadi Machinichi"	Lovely	Deva	
2001	"Moodu Vandhachu"	Krishna Krishna	S. A. Rajkumar	
2001	"Maradi Maalakshmi"	Orey Thammudu	Vandemataram Srinivas	Telugu song
2001	"Nee Paathuthu Ponaalum", "Kadhal Pannathinga"	Paarvai Ondre Pothume	Bharani	
2001	"Kudidu Kudidu Kunidadu", "Titanic Super Hero"	Jithendra	Deva	Kannada songs
2002	"Kannum Kannum Paathukitta"	Sundara Travels	Bharani	
2002	"Sevvanthi Thottatathile"	Nettru Varai Nee Yaaro	Deva	
2003	"Manitha Manitha"	Kalatpadai	Bharathwaj	
2003	"Salwar Poovanam"	Indru	Deva	
2004	"Tandanakka Pattu"	Vayasu Pasanga	R. K. Sundar	
2004	"Poda Poda"	Machi	A. R. Reihana	
2004	"Theekuchi", "Kattina Ivala" (2nd version)	Jai Soorya	Deva	
2004	"Thooki Soruguthadi"	Image	J. Surya	
2005	"Bhayavillada"	Nava Bharathi	Raj Bhaskar	Kannada song
2005	"Pottu Thalluda"	Amudhae	Sunil Xavier	
2005	"Vaada Machan"	Alaiyadikkuthu	Bharani	
2006	"Panchumedhai Kaniye"	Imsai Arasan 23rd Pulikesi	Sabesh-Murali	
2007	"Ayyayyo"	Paruthi Veeran	Yuvan Shankar Raja	
2009	"Vaama Ponnu"	Nee Unnai Arindhaal	R. K. Sundar	
2009	"Madhura Jilla"	Engal Aasan	Sabesh-Murali	
2009	"Kanthaga Pumiyile"	Malayan	Dhina	
2009	"Kadhalilae Pengalukku"	Naai Kutty	Vijayabharathi	
2010	"Thangachi"	Kutti Pisasu	Deva	
2010	"Siriki Vaadi"	Goripalayam	Sabesh-Murali	
2010	"Nee Sirichupaakura"	Milaga	Sabesh-Murali	
2011	"Kaathadicha Nogumunu"	Muthukku Muthaaga	Kavi Periyathambi	
2012	"Oore Oore Ennapetha"	Aravaan	Karthik	
2012	"Aambalaikum Pombalaikum"	Kazhugu	Yuvan Shankar Raja	
2013	"Malli Malli"	Masani	S. N. Fazil	
2014	"Ulloor Samigala"	Rettai Vaalu	V. Selvaganesh	
2016	"Odittanga"	Unnodu Ka	C. Sathya	
2017	"Aana Porunthavan"	Ivan Yarendru Therikiratha	N. R. Raghunanthan	
2019	"Naalu Nimisham"	Soorarai Pottru	G. V. Prakash Kumar	
