= Kalavu (2019 film) =

2017 film by Murali Karthick

- Poster
- Directed by: Murali Karthick
- Written by: Murali Karthick
- Produced by: Diliban M. Sengottian; I. B. Karthikeyan
- Starring: Kalaiyarasan; Karunakaran; Venkat Prabhu; Vatsan Chakravarthy; Abhirami Iyer
- Cinematography: Vignesh Rajagopalan
- Edited by: Kiripakaran Purushothaman
- Music by: K. S. Sundaramurthy
- Production companies: Spicy Cool Impressions; Big Print Pictures
- Distributed by: ZEE5
- Release date: 9 February 2019
- Country: India
- Language: Tamil

Kalavu (transl. Theft) is a 2019 Indian Tamil-language crime thriller film written and directed by Murali Karthick. The film stars Kalaiyarasan and Karunakaran, with Vatsan Chakravarthy and Abhirami Iyer in a supporting roles. The film has music composed by Sundaramurthy. The film was released on ZEE5 on 9 February 2019.

== Plot ==
The plot of Kalavu, is held together by an incident of theft. Hence, the title. But there’s also another thread that connects the main characters of Kalavu together: lies. It isn’t a coincidence that Kalavu opens with a couplet structured like a Thirukkural. The Thirukkural, in one of its verses, says that even a lie will be placed on par with the truth if it gives unblemished returns. The film begins with white lies: A son lies to his parents about drinking; a man lies to his friends to make them meet him. But as the plot unfolds, the lies grow darker, and so does the intent. Kalavu acts as more of a reminder of our clandestine selves.

== Cast ==
- Kalaiyarasan as Sujeeth
- Karunakaran as Gautham
- Venkat Prabhu as Inspector
- Vatsan Chakravarthy as Stephen
- Abhirami Venkatachalam as Shruthi
- Chinni Jayanth as watchman
- Chetan as Sujeeth's father
- Geevee as Ashok
- Gautham Harikrishnan
- Aravind Murali as Maari

== Production ==
Debutant director Murali Karthick created a 37-minute pilot film to show producers before getting an opportunity to make the film. Kalaiyarasan, Karunakaran and Venkat Prabhu were selected to play the lead roles, while model Abhirami Iyer was signed to play a lead actress.

== Reception ==
The film was released as a ZEE5 original on 9 February 2019. The Indian Express wrote "The writing is intelligent and so is the screenplay. With the scenes and its match cuts, director Murali Karthick firmly positions himself as an unreliable narrator, keeping you hooked".
