= Santhosham (1998 film) =

- Poster
- Directed by: Karthik
- Written by: Agathiyan
- Produced by: Ve. Baabu
- Starring: Saravanan; Suvalakshmi
- Cinematography: Ramsingh
- Edited by: G. Gopinath
- Music by: Deva
- Production company: Janaki Ammal Movies
- Release date: 14 April 1998
- Running time: 140 minutes
- Country: India
- Language: Tamil

Santhosham (transl. Happiness) is a 1998 Indian Tamil-language drama film directed by Karthik and written by Agathiyan. The film stars Saravanan and Suvalakshmi, with K. S. Ravikumar, Anand Babu, Prakash Raj, R. Sundarrajan and Thalaivasal Vijay playing supporting roles. It was released on 14 April 1998.

== Plot ==
Indran is a jobless young man despite being a gold medalist graduate. Without revenue, he collapses under debt and always has ad luck so people who know him neglect him. Only Bhavani befriends him. One day, he meets his college friend Karthik who works for the minister Nadesan and Karthik promises to find him a decent job in politics. During the interview, his bad luck continued. Later, with the help of Bhavani, he becomes an auto rickshaw driver. Someday, he carries a pregnant lady in his auto rickshaw to the hospital. The next day, the father of the pregnant lady comes to congratulate him for this good deed and gives him a decent job in his company. Then, Indran proposes his love to Bhavani and she accepts to marry him. Finally, Indran gets married with Bhavani and he becomes the happiest man in the world but the happiness was short-lived. What transpires next forms the rest of the story.

== Cast ==
- Saravanan as Indran
- Suvalakshmi as Bhavani
- K. S. Ravikumar
- Anand Babu as Karthik
- Prakash Raj as Nadesan
- R. Sundarrajan
- Thalaivasal Vijay as Kanthaswamy
- Pandu
- Kavithalaya Krishnan as Krishnan
- Sathyapriya
- Chandrakala as Chandra
- Baby Sowmya as Valli
- Kovai Senthil
- T.V. Saravanan as Vadivelu
- Oru Viral Krishna Rao as Tea master
- Idichapuli Selvaraj
- Thideer Kannaiah
- Haja Sheriff
- Salem Vijayaraj
- Mahesh
- Nandakumar
- Premit Kumar
- Kottai Perumal

== Production ==
The film marked the directorial debut of Rama Narayanan's assistant Rajapandi who was rechristened Karthik.

== Soundtrack ==
The soundtrack was composed by Deva, with lyrics written by Agathiyan.

Song	Singer(s)	Duration
"Kaalam Poranthachuda"	Mano	4:50
"Kalaiyil Ezhunthu"	Deva	5:17
"Kondaiyil"	Krishnaraj	5:00
"Sethu Mathava"	P. Unni Krishnan, Anuradha Sriram	4:31
"Subramani"	Deva, Sabesh–Murali	4:59

== Reception ==
D. S. Ramanujam of The Hindu wrote, "The dialogue and screenplay is Agathiyan's forte, which have been given the adequate treatment by director Karthik". The film did reasonably well at the box office. Two years after release, the producers were given a ₹5 lakh (equivalent to ₹23 lakh or US$23,000 in 2026) subsidy by the Tamil Nadu government along with several other films.
