= Jaggubhai =

- Theatrical release poster
- Directed by: K. S. Ravikumar
- Screenplay by: K. S. Ravikumar
- Story by: Kamalesh Kumar
- Produced by: Radhika Sarathkumar; Punit Goenka
- Starring: R. Sarathkumar; Shriya Saran; Srisha
- Cinematography: R. D. Rajasekhar
- Edited by: Don Max
- Music by: Rafee
- Production company: Radaan Mediaworks
- Distributed by: Zee Motion Pictures
- Release date: 29 January 2010
- Country: India
- Language: Tamil

Jaggubhai is a 2010 Indian Tamil-language action drama film written and directed by K. S. Ravikumar. The film stars R. Sarathkumar, Shriya Saran and debutant Srisha; it is produced by Sarathkumar's wife Radhika, and Punit Goenka. The film has music composed by Rafee, whilst cinematography is handled by R. D. Rajasekhar and the film is edited by Don Max. It is a remake of the 2001 French film Wasabi. The plot follows the journey of an Indian police officer, fondly known as "Jaggubhai", who is sent to Australia on an important mission to deal with anti-social elements there.

The film, originally launched as a Rajinikanth-starrer in 2004, resurfaced in 2008 with a new cast. Shooting took place in various countries including, Australia, Malaysia and Thailand.

Prior to release, the film was controversially leaked online and printed as DVDs, with subsequent actions causing a media uproar in the film industry. The film then re-shot the climax and premiered in Chennai to the most-well attended Tamil film premiere to that point on 27 January 2010, while the film released theatrically two days later.

== Plot ==
Jagannathan, fondly known as Jaggubhai, is an upright, straightforward, and tough Indian police officer with sharp methods. His way of dealing with the criminals strikes terror in the underground world. Jaggubhai is sent to Australia on an important mission to deal with antisocial elements there. In Australia, he meets Ilavarasi, and they fall in love with each other. Jaggubhai fails in his mission for which he came to Australia, and the brief romance with Ilavarasi also ends abruptly. Jaggubhai returns to India as a dejected officer, failing in both his official duty and personal life. However, fate had something in store for him. 20 years later, or as he says it 21 years later, he gets a call from Australia stating that Ilavarasi is dead and has left him a will. He reaches Australia and is shocked to know that the brief encounter with Ilavarasi had resulted in a daughter named Monisha, who is now an adult. Jaggubhai realises that he has left behind his daughter and her wish that he should protect her. Monisha thinks he is her mother's friend and tries to act cranky. The threat comes in the form of some antisocial elements who want to eliminate Monisha. These thugs were the same ones who had tricked Jaggubhai 21 years earlier and who had killed Ilavarasi. Now, it is Jaggubhai's duty to save his only daughter and settle old scores with the thugs. He now meets his former colleague Kaaliyappan or MIB. With his help, he kills the thugs and their leader Hamid Ansari (Richard Raj). Monisha then accepts Jaggubhai as her father.

== Cast ==
- Sarath Kumar as Jagannathan (Jaggubhai)
- Shriya Saran as Monisha Jagannathan
- Srisha as Ilavarasi Jagannathan
- Kiran Rathod as Sumathi
- Goundamani as Kaaliyappan (MIB)
- Richard Raj as Hamid Ansari
- Vijayakumar as Sathyamoorthy, Police Commissioner and Jagannathan's father
- S. V. S. Kumar as Ilavarasan, Ilavarasi's father
- Manimaran Thorasamy as Manimaran
- Neelima Rani as Priya
- Mahendran as Mohan, Monisha's boyfriend
- Ganesh Babu as kidnapped girl's father
- K. S. Ravikumar in a special appearance

== Production ==
In mid-2004, K. S. Ravikumar planned a film under the title Jaggubhai with the proposed cast including Rajinikanth in the lead role playing a terrorist, and Aishwarya Rai was finalised to play the female lead role. The film had a photoshoot and was touted to be Rajinikanth's comeback film after the debacle of Baba in 2002. Shortly after filming began, however, due to creative differences between Rajinikanth and Ravikumar, Jaggubhai was delayed and subsequently shelved. Ravikumar revived the project in 2008 with R. Sarathkumar as the lead actor. Jacki was signed as the art director while Sarathkumar's home production company Radaan Mediaworks and Zee Motion Pictures collaborated to produce the film.

Sneha, who was picked to portray the mother in the film, opted out due to her discontent in being the mother of the heroine, played by Shriya Saran. After approaching Simran, Padmapriya Janakiraman, Kamalini Mukerji and Vimala Raman for the role, Bollywood actress Tabu agreed to do the mother's role, demanding a sum of ₹75 lakh (equivalent to ₹1.9 crore or US$200,000 in 2023) but later walked out. Newcomer Srisha was later handed that role. Kiran Rathod was also handed a role in the film, which was touted to be the first of her comeback.

== Internet piracy ==
A full-length, unfinished version of Jaggubhai was leaked and released on the internet and DVDs, far from the official release date. The leaked version did not have any background score or sound effects. Radhika, Sarathkumar and Ravikumar held a press meet condemning the film's piracy. The press meet was supported by Rajinikanth, Kamal Haasan and Suriya among others. The filmmakers later reshot the climax.

== Soundtrack ==
The soundtrack, released on 27 September 2009, was scored by newcomer Rafee, a Singapore-based musician and former assistant to A. R. Rahman. Pavithra Srinivasan of Rediff.com rated the album 2.5 out of 5 stars.

Song	Singers	Lyrics	Length
"Apple Laptop"	Shankar Mahadevan, Chinmayi	Kabilan	6:12
"Thuru Thuru"	Maheshwari Rani	Kathal Mathi	5:35
"Yezhu Vannathil"	Hariharan, Maheshwari Rani	Kabilan	5:37
"Vaa... Dhinam Dhinam"	Sunitha Sarathy	Na. Muthukumar	4:43
"Anbulla Maan Vizhiyae (Remix)"	Rafi, Maheshwari Rani	Vaali	3:20
"Acham, Madam"	Suchitra	Kalyanji	4:15
"Thuru Thuru" (slow)	Maheshwari Rani	Kadhal Mathi	4:32

== Release ==
Jaggubhai had a well-attended premiere on 27 January 2010 at a popular multiplex in Chennai, with the event being dubbed as the most well-attended film premiere of all time for a Tamil film. The film was theatrically released two days later.

== Critical reception ==
Pavithra Srinivasan of Rediff.com gave a very negative review of the film, criticising all major aspects from performance to production values, labelling Ravikumar as "the biggest culprit" whilst mentioning that "the screenplay is silliness personified". She described Sarathkumar as "a major disappointment, despite being given a role that would make any actor go green with envy", whilst Saran "gains brownie points by looking hot in various skimpy dresses" despite "not [being] successful in acting". Sify was relatively less critical, describing the film as "run of the mill" though citing that the "major plus point of the film is that it is only 2 hours, and the camera work of RD Rajasekhar is scintillating". The critical said Sarathkumar, with his "macho tough look carries the film on his shoulders", while Saran as the spoiled brat is "adequate". They added that Srisha "can’t emote" while Goundamani is a "scream".
