= Apple Penne =

2013 Indian film by R. K. Kalaimani

- Directed by: R. K. Kalaimani
- Produced by: KG Pandian
- Starring: Vatsan; Aishwarya Menon; Roja
- Cinematography: Prabhakar
- Edited by: Antony
- Music by: Mani Sharma
- Production company: KGP Films
- Release date: 14 November 2013
- Country: India
- Language: Tamil

Apple Penne (transl. Apple girl) is a 2013 Indian Tamil-language romantic drama film directed by R. K. Kalaimani. The film stars Vatsan and Aishwarya Menon, while Roja plays a pivotal role.

== Cast ==
- Vatsan as James
- Aishwarya Menon as Komalavalli
- Roja as Hamsavalli
- Thambi Ramaiah as Constable Arumugam
- Suresh
- Deva
- Suchitra
- KG Pandian

== Production ==
Vatsan was roped in to play the lead role in the film for the first time in his career after producer K. G. Pandian noticed him for his roles in his previous films. The film is a woman-centric film and Roja was roped in to play a pivotal role.

== Soundtrack ==
The film features seven songs composed by Mani Sharma. Kalaipuli Thanu released the audio in September 2013. The soundtrack was released under the label Saregama.

No.	Song	Singers	Lyrics
1	"Amma Unnai"	Poornima	Yugabharathi
2	"Aatha Appan"	Shaji	Yugabharathi
3	"Padu Padu"	Padmalatha	Viveka
4	"Thoongatha Boologam"	Harini	Yugabharathi
5	"Oru Podhum"	Pavan, Gayathri	Yugabharathi
6	"Velli Sevai"	Velmurugan	Yugabharathi
7	"Ennai Thandi"	Uma Ramanan	Yugabharathi

== Release ==
The Times of India gave the film one-and-a-half stars and wrote that "There is a dated feel to almost everything in Apple Penne, right from the plot to the filmmaking".
