= Sabesh–Murali =

Indian music director duo

- Origin: Chennai, Tamil Nadu, India
- Occupations: Music directors, playback singers
- Years active: 1999 - 2025

Sabesh–Murali was an Indian music director duo, who have jointly composed for many Tamil films.

== Career ==
Sabesh and Murali are siblings who began their careers working under their brother, the music director Deva, as assistant composers. They composed famous albums such as Pokkisham and Milaga. The duo were also, rarely, playback singers. They composed for the Tamil films Imsai Arasan 23am Pulikesi and Goripalayam. They also held key positions in the Cine Musicians' Union with Sabesh being the president and Murali being the general secretary.

Sabesh also notably composed the theme that appears during the title card of Rajinikanth's Annaamalai (1992).

== Personal life ==
Sabesh–Murali are the younger brothers of popular music composer Deva. Sabesh's son Karthik (d. 2026) was an actor while Murali's son Bobo Shashi is a composer. Their nephews are actor Jai and composer Srikanth Deva. Srikanth's wife Febi Mani is a playback singer.

Sabesh died on 23 October 2025 at the age of 68.

== Discography ==
=== As composer ===
==== Songs and score ====
- Samuthiram (2001)
- Naina (2002)
- Aayiram Poi Solli (2002)
- Paarai (2003)
- Ayodhya (2005)
- Gurudeva (2005)
- Adaikalam (2005)
- Thavamai Thavamirundhu (2005)
- Perusu (2005)
- Suyetchai MLA (2006)
- Imsai Arasan 23am Pulikesi (2006)
- Pachchak Kuthira (2006)
- Niram (2007)
- Mirugam (2007)
- Mudhal Kanave (2007)
- Koodal Nagar (2007)
- Ammuvagiya Naan (2007)
- Azhagu Nilayam (2008)
- Ashoka (2008)
- Indiralohathil Na Azhagappan (2008)
- Pokkisham (2009)
- Vaigai (2009)
- Alaiyodu Vilayadu (2009)
- Engal Aasan (2009)
- Mayandi Kudumbathar (2009)
- Milaga (2010)
- Goripalayam (2010)
- Mittai (2011)
- Maithanam (2011)
- Pechiyakka Marumagan (2012)
- Sandhithathum Sindhithathum (2013)
- Kallapetti (2013)
- Sankarapuram (2014)
- Paranjothy (2015)
- Kavaathu (2017)

==== Background score only ====
- Note: they also have been credited as helping with the music for several of Deva's films.
- Jodi (1999)
- Star (2001)
- Pasakiligal (2006)
- Paarijatham (2006)
- Thalaimagan (2006)
- Arasangam (2008)
- Autograph (2004)
- Pattalam (2009)
- Adhe Neram Adhe Idam (2009)
- Sindhu Samaveli (2010)
- Irumbu Kottai Murattu Singam (2010)
- Kattradhu Kalavu (2010)
- Ambasamuthiram Ambani (2010)
- Vithagan (2011)
- Kadhal Pisase (2012)
- Annakodi (2013)
- Mathapoo (2013)
- Sivappu (2015)
- Kangaroo (2015)
- Yentha Nerathilum (2017)
- Kodiveeran (2017)
- Thirumanam (2019)
- Meendum Oru Mariyadhai (2020)

=== Singer ===
==== Sabesh ====
Year	Film	Song	Music	Co-Singer
1997	Abhimanyu	Meadam Enna	Deva	
1997	Kaalamellam Kadhal Vaazhga	Annanagar Andalu	Deva	
1997	Nesam	Kundrathile Koyila Katti	Deva	
1997	Rettai Jadai Vayasu	Idlikku Mavu Attaiyle	Deva	Krishnaraj & Anuradha Sriram
1998	Kaadhale Nimmadhi	Kandhan Irukkum Idam	Deva	
1998	Kannedhirey Thondrinal	Kothal Savadi Lady	Deva	
1998	Ninaithen Vandhai	Manisha Manisha	Deva	Deva & Krishnaraj
1998	Santhosham	Subramani	Deva	Deva & Murali
1998	Unnudan	Paalaaru	Deva	
1999	Anantha Poongatre	Meenatchi Meenatchi	Deva	Deva
1999	Anantha Poongatre	Udhayam Theatrile	Deva	Deva
1999	Annan Thangachi	Palana Palana	Deva	Deva
1999	Hello	Valantines	Deva	Shankar Mahadevan
1999	Kanave Kalayadhe	Vaanguda 420 Beeda	Deva	Deva
1999	Maya	Thataka Pithaka	Deva	
1999	Ninaivirukkum Varai	Kathadikkuthu Kathadikkuthu	Deva	Krishnaraj
1999	Ooty	O Lilly	Deva	Krishnaraj
1999	Ponvizha	Barma Bazaru	Deva	Sindhu
1999	Pudhu Kudithanam	Ceylon Laila	Deva	Madhavan
1999	Ullathai Killathe	Arcottu Saalaiyile	Deva	Deva
2000	Aval Paavam	Myalapore Mama	Pradeep Ravi	
2000	Ennamma Kannu	Koyambedu Kokila	Deva	Deva & Murali
2000	En Sakhiye	Govindamma	Pradeep Ravi	
2000	Sandhitha Velai	Kobapadathe Munimaa Kobapadathe	Deva	
2000	Sandhitha Velai	Ceylon Singala Penne	Deva	Sukhwinder Singh
2000	Kannaal Pesavaa	Maami Siricha	Deva	Malgudi Subha
2000	Thai Poranthachu	Chinna Veedu Chithra	Deva	
2000	Uyirile Kalanthathu	Kulukki Vacha Coca Cola Pole	Deva	Deva
2000	Veeranadai	Kalaiyile	Deva	Krishnaraj, Jayalakshmi, Sushmitha, Amrutha, Yugendran, Prashanthini & Venkat Prabhu
2001	Engalukkum Kaalam Varum	Indhandai Central Jailu	Deva	
2001	En Purushan Kuzhandhai Maadhiri	Vaazhavaikkum	Deva	Krishnaraj
2001	Looty	Madurakara Viveku	Deva	Vadivelu
2001	Ninaikkatha Naalillai	Meenabakkam Meenu	Deva	Devan Ekambaram
2001	Sound Party	Pooparikkum	Deva	
2002	Nettru Varai Nee Yaaro	Arubadai Veedu	Deva	
2002	Raajjiyam	Namma Ooru Chennaiyile	Bharadwaj	
2002	Vivaramana Aalu	Adiye Azhagi Aaravalli	Deva	Anuradha Sriram & Chitra Sivaraman
2003	Military	Mama Mama	Deva	Deva, Murali, Ramji & Sundarrajan
2004	Aai	Aai Mailapuru	Srikanth Deva	Manikka Vinayagam, Ganga Sitharasu & Suchitra
2004	Ramakrishna	Peiyummazhiyamma	Deva	Deva, Sadhana Sargam, Karthik, Paravai Muniyamma & Jayalakshmi
2005	Aadhikkam	Black Ticket	Chandrabose	
2005	Ayodhya	Bhagavane Enn Kadhal	Sabesh–Murali	Chinmayi Sripada
2005	Devathaiyai Kanden	Ore Oru Thopula	Deva	Srilekha Parthasarathy
2005	Gurudeva	Saiva Karuvadu	Sabesh–Murali	Manikka Vinayagam & Srilekha Parthasarathy
2005	Thavamai Thavamirundhu	Ore Oru Oorukkulle	Sabesh–Murali	Jayakumar
2005	Mayandi Kudumbathar	Poottu Siricha	Sabesh–Murali	Krishnaraj
2005	Vanakkam Thalaiva	Suttapazham	Deva	Grace Karunas
2007	Ammuvagiya Naan	Kaadhale Kaadhale	Sabesh–Murali	
2007	Chennai 600028	Jalsa	Yuvan Shankar Raja	Gana Ulaganathan, Gana Pazhani, Karunas & Premgi Amaren
2008	Mittai	Adi Aathadi	Sabesh–Murali	Sunilkumar & Jayadev
2009	Anthony Yaar?	Yamma Yamma	Dhina	
2010	Goripalayam	Otta Odasal	Sabesh–Murali	Murali & Janani
2010	Milaga	Samy Vandhuruchu	Sabesh–Murali	Sriram
2012	Kadhal Pisase	Gank Star	Brunthan	Murali & Aravind

==== Murali ====
Year	Film	Song	Music	Co-Singer
1998	Santhosham	Subramani	Deva	Deva & Sabesh
2000	Ennamma Kannu	Koyambedu Kokila	Deva	Deva & Sabesh
2003	Military	Mama Mama	Deva	Deva, Sabesh, Ramji & Sundarrajan
2010	Goripalayam	Otta Odasal	Sabesh–Murali	Sabesh & Janani
2010	Goripalayam	Aapakari Aapakari	Sabesh–Murali	Senthildass Velayutham, Shyam & Mimicry Senthil
2012	Kadhal Pisase	Gank Star	Brunthan	Sabesh & Aravind

=== Television ===
Year	Name of Television Show	Song	Network	Notes
2019 - 2020	Rasaathi	Title song	Sun TV	
2024	Super Singer Season 10	—N/a	Star Vijay	Guest
