= Pratyush =

Pratyush is a given name commonly found among Indian people. Notable people with this name include:

- Pratyush Buddiga (born 1989), New Zealand-American poker player and spelling bee champion
- Pratyush Kumar (born 1995), Indian cricketer
- Pratyush Prakash (born 1991), Indian lyricist and poet
- Pratyush Singh (born 1994), Indian cricketer
- Pratyush Sinha, Indian civil servant serving from 2006 to 2010

== See also ==
- Pratyusha
