= Band Master =

- Theatrical release poster
- Directed by: K. S. Ravikumar
- Story by: A. C. Chandrakumar
- Produced by: A. G. Subramaniam
- Starring: R. Sarathkumar; Heera
- Cinematography: Ashok Rajan
- Edited by: K. Thanikachalam
- Music by: Deva
- Production company: A. G. S. Movies
- Release date: 2 July 1993
- Running time: 143 minutes
- Country: India
- Language: Tamil

Band Master is a 1993 Indian Tamil-language romantic drama film, directed by K. S. Ravikumar. The film stars R. Sarathkumar and Heera, with Ranjitha, Vijayakumar and Srividya in supporting roles. It was released on 2 July 1993.

== Plot ==
Ravi, a bandmaster, leads a happy and self-contented life. Circumstances make him fall in love with Gita without realising that she is a minister's only daughter.

== Cast ==
- R. Sarathkumar as Ravi
- Heera as Gita
- Ranjitha as Meenakshi
- Vijayakumar as Veeraraghavan
- Srividya
- Goundamani as Mani
- Senthil as Albert
- Chinni Jayanth as the driver
- Uday Prakash
- Pandu
- K. S. Ravikumar

== Soundtrack ==
Soundtrack was composed by Deva. Lyrics were written by Vaali and Kalidasan.

Song	Singers	Lyrics
"Kili Joshiyam Parthen"	K. S. Chithra, S. P. Balasubrahmanyam	Kalidasan
"Paattuku Yaaradi Pallavi"	S. P. Balasubrahmanyam, K. S. Chithra	Vaali
"Putham Puthu"	Malaysia Vasudevan, Swarnalatha	Kalidasan
"Pudhiya Nilave"	S. P. Balasubrahmanyam	Kalidasan
"Thiruneer Mala"	S. P. Balasubrahmanyam	Kalidasan

== Release and reception ==
Band Master was released on 2 July 1993. Malini Mannath of The Indian Express praised Ravikumar's handling of the film's humour, and also praised the performances of Sarathkumar, Heera and Chinni Jayanth, calling him the "scene-stealer".

== Controversy ==
In 2022, Lakshmi Priya, writing for The News Minute, criticised one scene where Ranjitha's character ill treats two dwarf characters by asking them to sniff food because "a sniff would be enough for their size" as insensitive, and a bad example of dwarfs being used for comic effect in Indian cinema.
