= Bava Nachadu =

2001 film by K. S. Ravikumar

- Directed by: K. S. Ravikumar
- Screenplay by: K. S. Ravikumar
- Story by: Janardhana Maharshi
- Produced by: M. Arjuna Raju
- Starring: Nagarjuna Akkineni; Simran; Reema Sen
- Cinematography: Shyam K. Naidu
- Edited by: Kola Bhaskar
- Music by: M. M. Keeravani
- Production company: Roja Movies
- Release date: 7 June 2001
- Running time: 146 minutes
- Country: India
- Language: Telugu

Bava Nachadu (transl. Brother-in-law I love you) is a 2001 Indian Telugu-language romantic film directed by K. S. Ravikumar. It stars Nagarjuna Akkineni, Simran and Reema Sen, with music scored by M. M. Keeravani. The film is loosely based on the Malayalam film Life Is Beautiful (2000). The film was released to mixed reviews. The film was dubbed in Tamil as Hello Mama.

== Plot ==
Ajay (Nagarjuna Akkineni) is an adman (director and actor) who has a definite idea about how his future wife should be. He marries a village belle Meenakshi (Simran), handpicked by his mother from her native town Kovvuru. Sometime later, Meenakshi meets with a hairline fracture and gets pregnant. Her entire family lands up at Ajay's house to take care of Meenakshi.

She has a beautiful and greedy sister called Lahari (Reema Sen). During that period Suma (Suman Ranganathan), the regular model of Ajay meets with a fracture and Lahari replaces her as the model opposite Ajay. Lahari is lured by the modeling profession and then falls in love with Ajay. But Ajay does not have any feelings for her. Meenakshi gets well and her family returns to their village.

Lahari tells Meenakshi about her desire to marry Ajay. Meenakshi gets mad and returns home to her husband. Meanwhile, Lahari attempts suicide. Meenakshi, being very close to Lahari, promises Lahari that she will get her married to Ajay. The rest of the film is about how Ajay manages to save his marriage without hurting Lahari.

== Cast ==
- Nagarjuna Akkineni as Ajay
- Simran as Meenakshi (Voice Dubbed by Savitha Reddy)
- Reema Sen as Lahari (Voice Dubbed by Sunitha)
- Suman Ranganathan as Suma
- Tanikella Bharani
- Mallikarjuna Rao
- M. S. Narayana
- Sudha
- Raja Ravindra
- Janardhana Maharshi
- Manorama
- Rajitha
- Gundu Sudarshan as Priest
- K. S. Ravikumar (cameo in "Anuragam Anuragamlo")

== Production ==
The film was tentatively titled Akka .. Bava Vachade. The film was launched on 16 November 2001 at a private building. The film was shot in about thirty days on a low budget. The songs "Anuragam Anuragamlo", "Chandamama Chandamama" and "Bang Bang" were shot in New Zealand.

== Soundtrack ==
Bava Nachadu

Soundtrack album by M. M. Keeravani
- Released: 2001
- Recorded: 2001
- Genre: Soundtrack
- Length: 30:37
- Label: Supreme Music; Aditya Music
- Producer: M. M. Keeravani

M. M. Keeravani chronology
Deepavali (2000)	Bava Nachadu (2001)	Akasa Veedhilo (2001)

The music was composed by M. M. Keeravani. The music was released on Supreme Audio company. Veturi told the media that he did not write the "Akka Bava Nachada" song.

Track listing
No.	Title	Lyrics	Singer(s)	Length
1.	"Anuragam Anuragamlo"	Chandrabose	Hariharan, Sujatha	5:22
2.	"Chandamama Chandamama"	Chandrabose	Udit Narayan, K.S. Chithra, Harini	4:49
3.	"Matotundhi Magada"	Sirivennela Seetarama Sastry	Shankar Mahadevan, Anuradha Sriram	5:31
4.	"Akka Bava Nachada"	Veturi	Harini	4:34
5.	"Bang Bang"	Sirivennela Seetarama Sastry	Shankar Mahadevan, Suneeta Rao	5:09
6.	"Very Sexy"	Chandrabose	Shankar Mahadevan, Ganga	5:12
Total length:				30:37

== Reception ==
Jeevi of Idlebrain.com rated the film three-and-a-half out of five and wrote that "This film is a sophisticated version of EVV's film sans vulgarity". A critic from Sify wrote that " On the whole the film just drags". Indiainfo wrote "It does not matter if you have a routine story line, but if you can present it well, it works. That is what the movie Baava Nachadu precisely is! The movie may not have an offbeat storyline but the impressive presentation makes it worth watching. It may not be as good as the other works of KS Ravi Kumar like Bhaamane Satya Bhaamane, but still he did make a good movie, we can say".
