= Arasangam =

- Theatrical release poster
- Directed by: R. Madhesh
- Written by: R. Madhesh
- Produced by: L. K. Sudhish
- Starring: Vijayakanth; Biju Menon
- Cinematography: Venkatesh Anguraj
- Edited by: Anthony
- Music by: Songs: Srikanth Deva; Background score: Sabesh–Murali
- Production company: Captain Cine Creations
- Distributed by: Pyramid Saimira
- Release date: 9 April 2008
- Running time: 156 minutes.
- Country: India
- Language: Tamil

Arasangam (transl. Government) is a 2008 Indian Tamil language political thriller film written and directed by R. Madhesh and produced by L. K. Sudhish. The film stars Vijayakanth in the lead role, making this his 150th film, along with Biju Menon in a dual role, while Navneet Kaur, Sheryl Pinto, Rahul Dev and Riyaz Khan play supporting roles. The film's soundtrack was composed by Srikanth Deva with cinematography by Venkatesh Anguraj and editing by Anthony. The film was released on 9 April 2008.

== Plot ==
Economically and strategically important CEOs, scientists, etc. are assassinated all over India. Since many of such murders take place in Chennai, the Home Minister of Tamil Nadu pressurises the DGP to speed up the investigation. ATS officer Manoj is invited to Chennai from Mumbai to help the Tamil Nadu Police Department. He mysteriously disappears during the flight. The police departments concludes there is a link between the assassinations and the disappearance of Manoj and hands over both the cases to criminologist and police trainer Arivarasu, who is also a close friend and brother-in-law of Manoj. Arivarasu's investigation takes him to Toronto, Canada, where he meets Manoj's lookalike Martin Jayapal, who has hatched a plot to destabilise India. How Arivarasu thwarts his intentions forms the rest of the story.

== Cast ==
- Vijayakanth as Arivarasu IPS, Police Trainer
- Biju Menon in a dual role as:
  - Manoj IPS, ATS
  - Martin Jayapal
- Navneet Kaur as Aarthi
- Sheryl Pinto as Lara
- Ravichandran as Home Minister of Tamil Nadu (guest appearance)
- Rahul Dev as Chandru
- Riyaz Khan as Jaffar
- Sriman as Terrorist
- Deepan Chakravarthy as DGP D. Dhanasekaran IPS
- Akila as Manisha, Manoj's sister
- Anjali Devi as Valliammal
- Rajendranath as Police inspector
- Rail Ravi as Doctor
- Pattinapakkam Jayaram as Cable TV operator
- Suzane George as Insurance sales agent
- Ramana Madhesh in a cameo appearance
- Leena Sidhu in a special appearance

== Production ==
A duet song featuring Vijayakanth and Navneet Kaur was shot at Coutrallam Falls.

== Soundtrack ==
Lyrics were written by Pa. Vijay and Kabilan.

Song	Singers	Lyrics
"Jil Jil"	Rita	Kabilan
"Pookkal Ethanai"	Prasanna, Swetha Mohan	Kabilan
"Ko Kuruvi"	Suchitra, Hemambika	Kabilan
"Cindrella"	Ujjayinee Roy	Pa. Vijay
"Adelaru Acham"	Ranjith, Megha	Pa. Vijay

== Critical reception ==
Pavithra Srinivasan of Rediff.com wrote, "Arasangam (Government) directed by Madhesh and starring 'Captain' Vijayakanth certainly didn't inspire wild hopes of an excellent movie. But fate has a way of throwing you off. This movie is one such pleasant surprise" and also noted "In the end though, its Madhesh's screenplay that wins, showing some signs of intelligence and hard work." Sify wrote, "For the undemanding masala fan, Arasangam is worth a look, when you compare it with the recent crop of over hyped super hero films that failed to deliver". IANS felt that Navneet Kaur was wasted, but added that "Vijaykanth acts his age and puts in a spirited performance. The action is slickly choreographed by 'Rocky' Rajesh" and the film "is a treat for diehard Vijaykanth fans thanks to a passably decent screenplay".
