= Muttom, Kanyakumari =

Village in Tamil Nadu, India

Muttom
- village
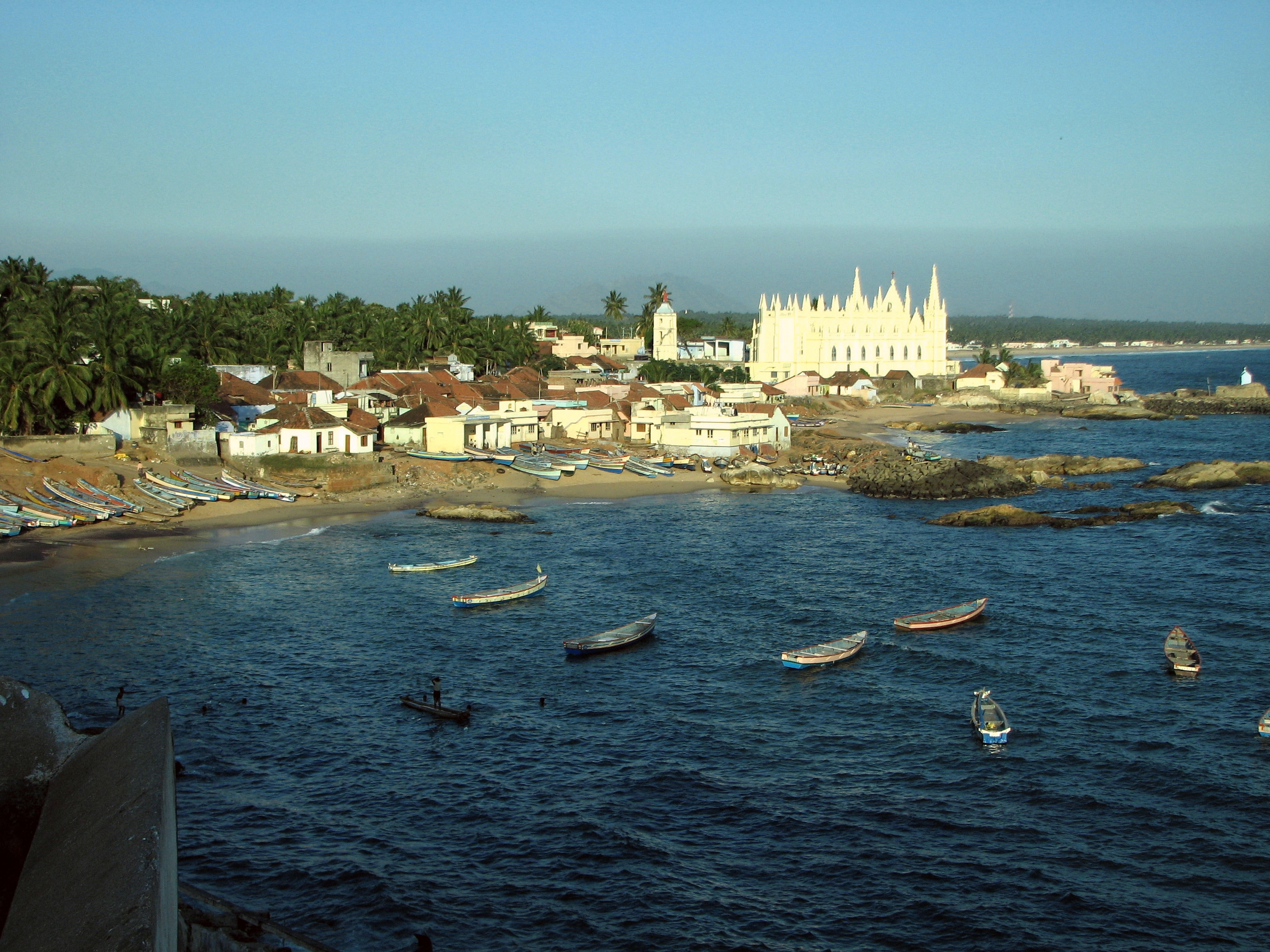
- Muttom Fishing Village
- Interactive map of Muttom
- Coordinates: +) 8.13°N 77.32°E
- Country: India
- State: Tamil Nadu
- District: Kanyakumari

Population (2012)
  - Total: 15,000 +

Languages
  - Official: Tamil
- Time zone: UTC+5:30 (IST)
- PIN: 629202
- Telephone code: 04651
- Vehicle registration: TN75
- Nearest city: Nagercoil, Trivandrum

Muttom is a village in Kanyakumari District of Tamil Nadu, India. It is a well-known beach with rocks and caves. The major occupation of people in Muttom is fishing. Due to the natural beauty of the beach, It attracts tourists from all over India. Many people come to the beach every day and spend their time on the seashore. This beach has one of the best sunsets in the district. Jeppiaar Fishing Harbour, the biggest private harbour in the state is located in Muttom.

== Geography ==
Muttom is one of the fishing villages, located 16 km from the capital town Nagercoil. It is well connected by road to the Nagercoil town. It is approximately 75 km from the Trivandrum International Airport. It is reachable from Kanyakumari by road with a distance of about 34 km. The nearest villages are Esanthangu, Ammandivillai, Pillaithoppu, Azhikal, Kadiyapattanam and Manavala Kurichi. Major roads reach Muttom via Ammandivillai, Esanthangu and Nagercoil. There is a lighthouse which was constructed by British India. The lighthouse, though near the sea, is situated 110 ft (34 m) above sea level. The structure was built when India was part of the British Empire until 1947.

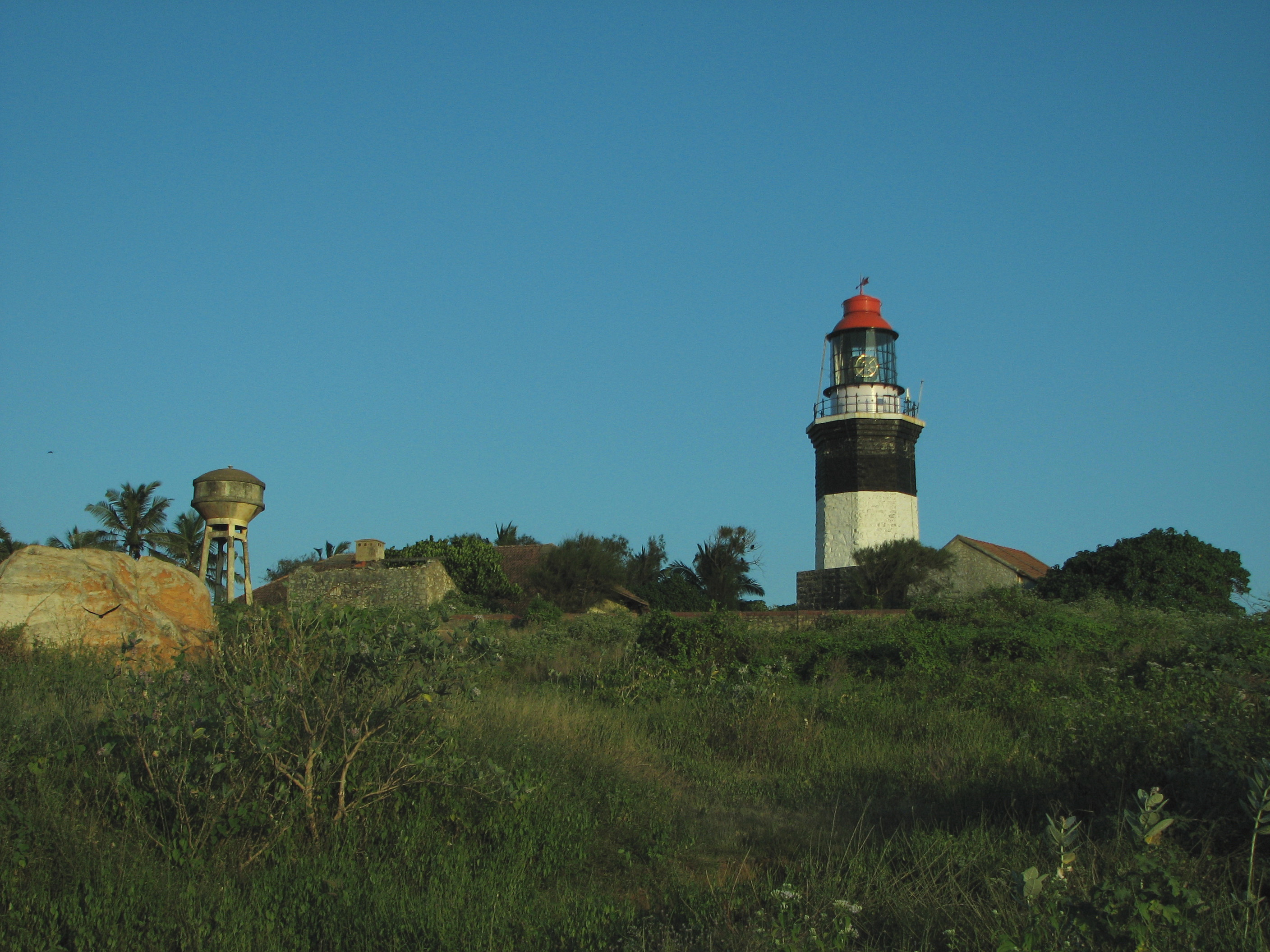
Muttom Lighthouse

== Demographics ==
More than 99% of the village are Christians and they do a variety of jobs. Majority of the people are fishermen who do fishing related works. Most of the people are educated at least to the school level. As most of the residents are Catholics, it has a catholic administration committee which is elected democratically and headed by the parish priest of the All Saints Church.

The Thirunanthikarai Cave Temple is one of the founding stones of the Jain religion. Currently, the Thirunanthikarai Cave Temple is under the purview and care of the Archaeological Survey of India. According to research, in 1003 AD, King Raja Raja Chola celebrated his birthday here. He conquered Muttom, and named Mummudi Chola Nalloor as stated in the stone carvings available in the temple. Around the eighth century AD an ascetic named Veeranandi came from Thirunarunkondai Melappalli and stayed here to preach Jainism.

== Education ==
Muttom has a primary school (St. John's primary school), managed by the catholic parish priest of Muttom and headed by the senior teacher as Headmaster. There also is a higher secondary school by the name of All Saints Higher Secondary School which is managed by the Monfort Brothers. This school has long-standing records in both sports and academics. Bishop Agniswamy College of Education is a self-financed college of education in Muttom administrated by the Bishop of the Roman Catholic Diocese of Kottar and is affiliated with Tamil Nadu Teachers Education University, Chennai. Kanyakumari Medical Mission research Centre (KMMC) is a Multi Super Speciality Hospital in Muttom and is administered by DMI Foundations, through DMI sisters, MMI fathers, and AMI associates. It is a state-of-art Hospital and Medical College along with Nursing and allied sciences. Model English School is a private primary school, that provides a quality education to the children of Muttom as well as neighbouring villages, which is a benefit to the small fishing villages.

== Light House ==
Muttom has a lighthouse, constructed by the British in colonial times. As recorded in international shipping charts, the lighthouse is situated 110 ft ( 34 m) above sea level. The Skelton was built when India was part of the British Empire until 1947. The British Government started lighthouse construction in 1857 and completed the work in 1882. The Lighthouse is now open for visitors, with 4-5000 visitors each year. A nominal entry fee of Rs.10 is charged for Adults and Rs.3 for students under age 12. Entry is free for School students in uniform.

== Beach ==
Muttom sports a tidy beach. Huge rocks standing on either side of the beach give the beach a pristine look. There is a children's park nearby. Muttom Beach is a prominent tourist destination that draws numerous visitors from both the local region and neighbouring states. Numerous films have been filmed against the scenic backdrop of Muttom beach such as Alaigal Oivathillai, Naan Paadum Paadal, Kadalora Kavithaigal, Kadal Pookkal, Unnai Kodu Ennai Tharuven and Guppy.

== Retreat Centres ==
- The Salvation Army Human Resource Development and Retreat Centre
- The Salvation Army Redshield House
- CSI Retreat Centre

== Transport ==
Buses serving this village :

- From Nagercoil 5C, 14A, 14C, 14DV,14EV,5F,
- From Thuckalay and Monday Market (alias Thingalchanthai or Thingalnagar) 47,47C,12G,46C
- From Kadiapattanam 14A, 14C, 14F, 46C, 47C
- From James Nager 14DV
- From kanyakumari SSS
- From Marthandam 46C
- From Ramanthurai 9k
- From Colachel 5C, SSS,9K,5F,14F

Nearest Rail Head

- Eraniel (ERL) - 10 km a small crossing station
- Nagercoil Town (NJT) - 17 km crossing station.
- Nagercoil Junction (NCJ) - 18 km Railway junction in Kanyakumari district for trains to all parts of India.

Nearest Airport

- Trivandrum (Thiruvananthapuram) 72 km by road

Nearest Seaport

- Muttom - Fishing Harbour
- Tuticorin (Thoothukudi) - 120 km Cargo Ship international/domestic, plans to ply passenger ships between Sri Lanka and India

Main town : Nagercoil for all kinds of accommodation and shopping. Just a 17 km away from Muttom.
