= Sheryl Pinto =

Indian actress

- Born: February 2, 1986 (age 40)
- Other name: Sheryl Brindo
- Occupation: Film actress
- Years active: 2008–2010

Sheryl Pinto is an Indian former actress who had primarily appeared in Tamil films. She made her debut in Vijayakanth's Arasangam (2008), before featuring in other films including Engal Aasan (2009) and Vaadaa (2010).

== Career ==
Sheryl Pinto made her acting debut with the Tamil language film Arasangam (2008) directed by Ramana Madhesh, co-starring Vijayakanth and Navaneet Kaur. She was signed again to feature alongside Vijayakanth in Engal Aasan (2009). She also appeared in the Telugu language film Satyameva Jayate (2009). In 2011, she was signed to play the lead role in Kalloori Desam but the film was shelved for unknown reasons. In 2012, she was chosen to act in Sakthi Chidambaram's Machan pairing opposite Ramesh Aravind. The film started production in early-2012 and was completed in late-2012 but it remained unreleased.

== Filmography ==
- All films are in Tamil, unless otherwise noted.

Year	Film	Role	Notes
2008	Arasangam	Lara	
2009	Engal Aasan	Jayanthi	
2009	Satyameva Jayate	Mahalakshmi	Telugu film
2010	Vaadaa	Anjali	
