= Paarai (film) =

- DVD cover
- Directed by: K. S. Ravikumar
- Story by: A. K. Lohithadas
- Based on: Mahayanam (Malayalam)
- Produced by: S. S. Durairaj
- Starring: R. Sarathkumar; Jayaram; Meena; Ramya Krishnan
- Cinematography: S. Sriram
- Edited by: K. Thanikachalam
- Music by: Sabesh–Murali
- Production company: Mass Movie Makers
- Release date: 13 June 2003
- Running time: 170 minutes
- Country: India
- Language: Tamil

Paarai (transl. Rock) is a 2003 Indian Tamil-language action drama film directed by K. S. Ravikumar. The film stars R. Sarathkumar, Jayaram, Meena and Ramya Krishnan. The music was composed by Sabesh–Murali. It is a remake of the Malayalam film Mahayanam and was released on 13 June 2003.

== Plot ==
Durairaj is a lorry driver who is tough as nails. He had a bitter childhood, has no relatives or friends, and his only solace is Jayaram, his cleaner who is just the opposite of him. Jayaram is a happy-go-lucky guy who dotes on his wife Mallika, mother, and daughter, and dreams of making enough money to build a small house for his family. Durai and Jayaram share a special bond as they understand each other well.

On his way to see his family, Jayaram dies in an accident, and Durai goes to his village with the body. There he finds that Jayaram's family needs his help, and out of sympathy, he decides to settle there and build a small house according to his friend's last wish. There, he comes across a local landlord Vijayan, who cheats the illiterate villagers by giving them loans and later taking over their property. Then there is a tea shop owner Vasantha, on whom the entire men folk lust. But she is hardworking, and at the same time foul-mouthed and a terror. Vasantha's brother, who is in love with Vijayan's daughter, starts the fight between Vijayan and Durai.

Durai works hard to make a house for Mallika, and when the villagers suspect his good intentions, he proves to them that he has a sisterly affection towards her, as he has a soft corner for Vasantha. As the fight goes on for Durai and Vijayan, Vijayan destroys the house that Durai built for his friends. Of this anger, he tries to get revenge. How Durai wins over the villagers and fights against injustice against Vijayan and his son forms the rest of the story.

== Cast ==
- R. Sarathkumar as Durai
- Jayaram as Jayaram
- Meena as Mallika
- Ramya Krishnan as Vasantha
- Vijayan as Vijayan
- Mansoor Ali Khan as Vijayan's son
- Vinu Chakravarthy as Chakravarthi
- Ramesh Khanna as Barber
- Chitti Babu as Sudalai
- Vadivukkarasi as Jayaram's mother
- Ajay Rathnam as Sub-Inspector
- Sabitha Anand as Rukmani, Durai's mother (Guest Appearance)
- Crane Manohar as Seller
- Dinesh Sha as childhood Durairaj
- K. S. Ravikumar in a special appearance as supervisor
- Ashok Raja special appearance in the "Aeroplane Parakkudhu"

== Soundtrack ==
Soundtrack was composed by Sabesh–Murali, with lyrics by Vairamuthu.

Track listing
No.	Title	Singer(s)	Length
1.	"Aeroplane Parakkudhu"	Udit Narayan
2.	"Naan Oru Kanaa Kanden"	Harish Raghavendra, Sujatha Mohan
3.	"Kannukkul Tick Tick"	Karthik Raja, Pop Shalini
4.	"Nanbane Nanbane"	Mano
5.	"Vinayaga Vinayaga"	Anuradha Sriram
6.	"En Thaai"	Krishnaraj

== Reception ==
Malini Mannath of Chennai Online called it "absorbing and sensitively crafted". Visual Dasan of Kalki wrote as the director believes in the combination of story plus character design, the rock oozes moisture. Malathi Rangarajan of The Hindu wrote, "Surely "Paarai" has provided ample scope for Sarath and the actor has made good use of the opportunity. All characters, major and minor, have definite, defining traits. Actually that is the strength of the film". Screen wrote "The combination of director KS Ravikumar and Sarath Kumar in Paarai has worked wonders. Ravikumar’s brilliant screenplay based on a plot of the Malayalam film Mahayanam with Sarath’s powerful performance as the silent loner makes the film a treat to watch." Sify wrote "Tamil cinema’s top commercial director K.S.Ravikumar who has been making light-hearted comedies recently understands that it is the age of rage. Nothing works better than an angry young man taking on the system. So Ravikumar who had the rights of an old Malayalam film Mahayanam has taken the central character of a rough and tough lorry driver and reworked the script to suit the Tamil milieu. Paarai is fast paced and has some good performance from the lead actors".
