= Satyameva Jayate (2009 film) =

2009 Telugu film by Jeevitha

Satyameva Jeyate
- Theatrical poster
- Directed by: Jeevitha Rajasekhar
- Screenplay by: Rajasekhar
- Story by: Rajkumar Santoshi; Shridhar Raghavan
- Produced by: Shivani; Shivathmika
- Starring: Rajasekhar; Sivaji; Sanjjana; Neetu Chandra; Milind Soman; Sayaji Shinde; Atul Kulkarni; Sheryl Pinto; Sai Kiran
- Cinematography: Loki P. Goud; P. S. Vamsi Krishna
- Edited by: Nandamuri Hari
- Music by: Chinna
- Production companies: Sivani & Sivatmika Films
- Release date: 13 February 2009
- Country: India
- Language: Telugu

Satyameva Jayate (transl. Truth alone triumphs) is a 2009 Indian Telugu-language action film directed by Jeevitha Rajasekhar. It is a remake of 2004 Hindi film Khakee and stars Rajasekhar, Sivaji, Sai Kiran, Neetu Chandra, Sanjjana and Sheryl Pinto, while Atul Kulkarni reprised his role as Dr. Iqbal Ansari from the original film. The music was composed by Chinna. The film did not fare well at the box office.

== Plot ==
DCP Sathya (Dr Rajashekhar) and his team are on an escorting mission to safely bring Ansari (Atul Kulkarni) from Vizag to Hyderabad. Ranadev (Milind Soman) and his team are out to eliminate Ansari on the orders of the Home minister (Sayaji Shinde). How DCP Sathya saves Ansari and the repercussions form the story.

== Cast ==
- Rajasekhar as DCP Sathya
- Sivaji as Prathap
- Neetu Chandra as SI Basara Papa
- Sanjjana as Sanjana
- Milind Soman as Ranadev (International Terrorist)
- Sayaji Shinde as Anand Rao
- Raghu Babu as Raghu IAS Commissioner
- Ali as Rama Rao, Sathya's friend
- Atul Kulkarni as Dr. Iqbal Ansari (Reprised his role from Khakee)
- Sheryl Pinto as Mahalakshmi
- Sai Kiran as Police Officer in DSP Sathya team
- Brahmanandam as Nandagopal "Nandu"
- Ahuti Prasad as Swamy Naidu IPS (Commissioner)
- Seema Kapoor as Inspector Damini
- M. Satyanarayana Rao in a special appearance

== Production ==
Rajasekhar revealed that he took the basic plot of Khakee and he himself created a different screenplay for Telugu version. Tusshar Kapoor's character from Khakee was changed into a female character in Telugu version, which was played by Neetu Chandra.

== Soundtrack ==
The music was composed by S. Chinna and released by Aditya Music. The tune of the track "Enthaa Jaadu" was reused from the track "Aisa Jadoo" from the original film, in which film Ram Sampath was the music director.

Satyameva Jayate

Soundtrack album by S. Chinna
- Released: 2009
- Recorded: 2009
- Genre: Soundtrack
- Length: 25:22
- Label: Aditya Music
- Producer: S. Chinna

Track list
No.	Title	Singer(s)	Length
1.	"Sathyameva Jayetha"	Rahul Nambiar, Naveen	3:53
2.	"Saaganee"	Karthik, Shweta	5:26
3.	"IPS Andale"	Rita	4:40
4.	"Love You Love You"	Rahul Nambiar, Chinmayee	4:39
5.	"Enthaa Jaadu"	Rahul Nambiar, Ujjaini	4:13
6.	"Sita Seemantham"	Rita	2:31
Total length:			25:22
