= Paattali =

- Title card
- Directed by: K. S. Ravikumar
- Screenplay by: K. S. Ravikumar
- Story by: Chinni Krishna
- Produced by: M. Kaja Mydeen
- Starring: R. Sarathkumar; Ramya Krishnan; Devayani
- Cinematography: Ashok Rajan
- Edited by: K. Thanikachalam
- Music by: S. A. Rajkumar
- Production company: Roja Combines
- Release date: 17 December 1999
- Country: India
- Language: Tamil

Paattali (transl. Proletariat) is a 1999 Indian Tamil-language action drama film directed by K. S. Ravikumar from a story by Chinni Krishna. It stars R. Sarathkumar, Ramya Krishnan and Devayani. The music is composed by S. A. Rajkumar. Paattali was released on 17 December 1999. The film was dubbed in Telugu as Narasimhudu and released on 26 October 2001, which was a failure.

== Plot ==
Shanmugam is the grandson of the rich landlord Kulasekaran based at the Karamadai area in the Coimbatore District of Tamil Nadu. Upon his parents' early death, Kulasekaran transfers all his wealth to Shanmugam and passes away. Shanmugam is raised by his paternal aunt Lakshmi. However, Lakshmi's husband Rajarathinam is greedy about money and tries to kill Shanmugam. To save Shanmugam from her cruel husband, Lakshmi lies with the help of their family lawyer Naachiyappan that the entire wealth is transferred to her name and let Shanmugam grow as a servant in the same home.

Shanmugam is very fond of Lakshmi and treats her as his own mother. Shanmugam falls in love with Shakuntala who is employed in the same house. Kannamma is the only daughter of Lakshmi and she returns to the village post completion of her studies from abroad. While Lakshmi dreams of marrying Kannamma to Shanmugam, she has other plans. Kannamma discloses that she is in love with her classmate Raja. Although not interested, Lakshmi agrees for the wedding. One day, Shanmugam is sick and Sakunthala plays a prank on him without knowing by making him jump in the river which makes his condition worse. However, Shakuntala saves him, but Shanmugam shivers in cold. Accidentally, they both enter into a physical relationship and Shanmugam promises to marry her. Meanwhile, on the day of Kannamma's marriage, Raja and his parents cancel the wedding knowing that all their properties actually belong to Shanmugam only. Rajarathinam gets shocked knowing the truth. To save the life of Kannamma, Lakshmi requests Shanmugam to marry her. As Shanmugam could not turn down her request, he agrees and marries Kannamma.

To Shanmugam's shock, Shakuntala gets pregnant so she decides to leave the village as she does not want to interrupt Shanmugam's life once again. But Shanmugam stops her and accommodates her in their farmhouse, which is managed by Mani, Rajarathinam's sidekick who was a corrupt person but has just reformed after seeing their sacrifices for each other and feels proud of them. Shanmugam secretly visits Shakuntala and takes her to hospital for periodical check-up. Kannamma also visits the same doctor once and she spots Shanmugam and Shakuntala together. Kannamma feels heartbroken but understands the situation of Shanmugam. Shakuntala discloses the truth and speaks in favour of Shanmugam. Rajarathinam's henchmen try to kill Shakuntala and her baby. But she is saved by Kannamma and the baby is delivered successfully. Shanmugam, with a greater upper hand, fights with and defeats both his own uncle and his henchmen. Finally, Shanmugam is married to Shakuntala but begins a fresh life with Kannamma, on Shakuntala's advice and hence the movie ends with a happy ending.

== Cast ==
- R. Sarathkumar as Shanmugam
- Ramya Krishnan as Kannamma
- Devayani as Shakuntala
- Sujatha as Lakshmi
- Manivannan as Mani
- Anandaraj as Rajarathinam
- Vadivelu as Vadivelan / Vadivu
- Kovai Sarala as Olaiyamma
- Vinu Chakravarthy as Kulasekaran
- R. Sundarrajan as Ramadurai
- Anu Mohan as Avudaiappan
- Crane Manohar as Senthil
- Pandu as Lawyer Naachiyappan
- Bharath Kalyan as Raja
- Vasu Vikram as Kalingarayan
- Idichapuli Selvaraj as Kathamuthu
- K. Natraj as Rathnam
- Kallukkul Eeram Ramanathan as Rangan
- Halwa Vasu as Manikkam
- Chaplin Balu as Kathavarayan
- Kovai Senthil as a priest
- Master Mahendran as Young Shanmugam
- Hemalatha as Young Shakuntala
- Cheenu Mohan as a servant
- K. S. Ravikumar as a flower decorator (cameo appearance)

== Production ==
During the filming of a stunt sequence, Sarathkumar dislocated his left hand joint and took almost two weeks to recover. Meena was first offered the female lead role, but could not sign on because of her commitment to Vaanathaippola (2000) and was replaced by Ramya Krishnan.

== Soundtrack ==
The music was composed by S. A. Rajkumar.

Track listing
No.	Title	Lyrics	Singer(s)	Length
1.	"Chinna Chinna Veettu"	Viveka	Anuradha Sriram, Sujatha Mohan	4:36
2.	"Kadhal Azhaga"	Kalaikumar	Hariharan, Sujatha Mohan	4:43
3.	"Siruvani Oothallo" (female)	S. A. Rajkumar	K. S. Chithra	5:08
4.	"Siruvani Oothallo" (male)	S. A. Rajkumar	S. A. Rajkumar	5:08
5.	"Srirangam Petru Thandha"	Kamakodiyan	Hariharan, Harini	4:24
6.	"Ulaga Azhagiya"	Kalidasan	Anuradha Sriram, Harini, Srinivas	5:07
7.	"Vanna Therodum"	Kalidasan	Mano	4:36
Total length:				33:42

== Reception ==
Malathi Rangarajan of The Hindu wrote, "With Chinni Krishna's stale storyline, K. S. Ravikumar, who is in charge of the screenplay, dialogue and direction, has tried to create a successful entertainer. But how appealing it is is anybody's guess". K. N. Vijiyan of New Straits Times praised Ramya Krishnan and Devayani for their acting, but criticised the weak plot. Deccan Herald wrote, "This Sarath Kumar starrer by K S Ravi Kumar is not bad at all. For anybody with an interest in the Tamil character, this is a must see". Dinakaran wrote, "Director K.S.Ravikumar has played much jubilantly by letting two girls in between the hero. The story moves on steadfastly, without any lagging". Chennai Online wrote "The film has shades of ‘Padayappa’ and ‘Arunachalam’ in it. It is a role Sharat Kumar has handled earlier". Vadivelu won the Dinakaran Cinema Award for Best Comedy Actor.
