= Perusu (2005 film) =

- Poster
- Directed by: GK
- Written by: GK
- Starring: Madhu
- Cinematography: Prabhakar
- Edited by: K. B. Shankar
- Music by: Sabesh–Murali
- Production company: Pindex Creations
- Release date: 1 November 2005
- Country: India
- Language: Tamil

Perusu (transl. Bigshot) (Note: Also a nickname for the title character.) is a 2005 Indian Tamil-language biographical crime film, based on the life of gangster Ayodhyakuppam Veeramani, who was shot dead in 2003. The film, written and directed by GK, stars Madhu as Veeramani. It was released on 1 November 2005, and failed at the box office.

== Cast ==
- Madhu as Ayodhyakuppam Veeramani
- Neepa as Porkodi
- Gemini Balaji as Karna
- Mohankumar as Nandu
- Deeptishri as Lily

== Critical reception ==
Malini Mannath of Chennai Online wrote, "For viewers fed up of the routine stuff, Perusu, intelligent and well-crafted, and sincerely attempting to break away from the routine grammar of film-making, is worth a watch". Cinesouth appreciated the casting choices and direction, but criticised the cinematography.
