= Thai Poranthachu =

- Poster
- Directed by: R. K. Kalaimani
- Story by: Prasanna Kumar
- Produced by: K. Prabhakaran
- Starring: Prabhu; Karthik; Kausalya
- Cinematography: K. S. Selvaraj
- Music by: Deva
- Production company: Anbalaya Films
- Release date: 19 February 2000
- Country: India
- Language: Tamil

Thai Poranthachu is a 2000 Indian Tamil-language drama film directed by R. K. Kalaimani. The film stars Prabhu, Karthik and Kausalya whilst Vivek and Ponnambalam play supporting roles. It was remade in Telugu as Choosoddaam Randi.

== Cast ==
- Prabhu as Vellaiyangiri
- Karthik as Aravind
- Kausalya as Geetha
- Vivek as Kutti
- Ponnambalam as Torcher Dharma
- Mayilsamy as 'Netrikkann' Netkundram
- Chinni Jayanth as James
- Vennira Aadai Moorthy
- Madhan Bob as Lalsan
- Vaiyapuri
- Pandu
- Scissor Manohar
- Thyagu
- Vichu Vishwanath
- Halwa Vasu
- Vijay Krishnaraj as Geetha's father
- K. R. Vatsala as Geetha's mother
- S. N. Lakshmi as Parvathiammal
- Lavanya
- Sridhar as dancer in "Gopala Gopala"

== Production ==
A fight sequence was shot at the electricity generating station near Gumdipoondi.

== Soundtrack ==
The music was composed by Deva.

Song	Singers	Lyrics
"Chinna Veedu Chithra"	Sabesh	Kalidasan
"Gopala Gopala"	Mano, Krishnaraj	Gangai Amaran
"Nilave Nilave"	Hariharan	Ilaya Kamban
"Sirippa Konjam"	Deva	Kalidasan
"Ulagathil Ulla" (Duet)	P. Unnikrishnan, Sujatha	Pa. Vijay
"Ulagathil Ulla" (Lady)	Sujatha	Pa. Vijay

== Critical reception ==
Tamil Star wrote "Thai Poranthachu' has a fairly good story line and would have been a good comedy film but for the treatment which often slips into medocrity". Krishna Chidambaram of Kalki praised Prabhu's acting, Vivek's comedy but felt the director who moved the story without confusion loses track like a train. Sify wrote that the film "has a fairly good story line and would have been a good comedy film but for the treatment which often slips into medocrity".

Indiainfo wrote "If you want to sacrifice your money and time for this stupid movie then go ahead. Prabhu with his funny wig and belly is a bad scene to look at but acts well. Kartik does his usual comic lover boy. The only new thing is stunt man Ponnambalam’s comedy". Malini Mannath of Chennai Online wrote "The film is fairly interesting in the earlier portions but soon falls into the familiar pattern". Savita Padmanabhan of The Hindu wrote "The film is quite entertaining in the first half. But in the second half, the director gets a little carried away and it drags a bit here and there".
