= Engal Aasan =

- Poster
- Directed by: R. K. Kalaimani
- Written by: R. K. Kalaimani
- Produced by: Thangaraj
- Starring: Vijayakanth; Vikranth; Sheryl Brindo; Akshaya; Suja Varunee
- Music by: Sabesh–Murali
- Release date: 17 July 2009
- Running time: 143 minutes
- Country: India
- Language: Tamil

Engal Aasan (transl. Our Mentor) is a 2009 Indian Tamil-language action comedy drama film directed by R. K. Kalaimani. The film stars Vijayakanth in the lead role and Vikranth, Sheryl Brindo, Akshaya and Suja Varunee playing supporting roles. The film was released on 17 July 2009. The film, upon release could not release in the big theatres and became a colossal flop.

== Plot ==
Mahendran, is a bank officer who is transferred to the branch of Village Nilakottai to sort out the perplexing situation of bank fraud carried on by a big shot named Ramki. Over there, he happens to find out that Ramki has borrowed a loan worth ₹250 million (equivalent to ₹630 million or US$6.6 million in 2023) in the name of villagers. Kumar and Muthu approach Ramki to return the money that he had illegally borrowed. When he refuses, he assures of arresting Ramki, and the very next day, Mahendran and his colleagues are pushed down in shock, for the entire bank is burnt down, and they are then dismissed. Mahendran, together with his mates, try to prove their innocence and reveal Ramki's true colors.

== Cast ==
- Vijayakanth as Mahendran
- Vikranth as Vasu
- Sheryl Brindo as Jayanthi
- Akshaya as Viji
- Suja Varunee as Usha
- Senthil as 'Aanikkaal' Ramasamy
- Ganja Karuppu as Yogiyan
- Ilavarasu as Muthu
- Sriman as Kumar
- Ramki as Marthandan
- Vasu Vikram as Pachatani Narayanan
- Aarthi as Jakkamma
- Balu Anand
- Madhan Bob
- Mayilsamy
- Singamuthu
- Mahanadi Shankar

== Production ==
Vijayakanth's role was originally supposed to be a cameo but later became a full-length role. The filming was held at Pollachi.

== Soundtrack ==
The music was composed by Sabesh–Murali.

Song	Singers	Length
"Ennai Enna"	Saindhavi	05:01
"Indha Oorukkuthan"	Mano	05:54
"Madhivadhana"	Kalyani Nair, Bhagyaraj	04:47
"Madhura Jilla"	Krishnaraj, Srilekha Parthasarathy	04:18
"Solli Tharava"	Vijay Yesudas, Anuradha Sriram	04:39
