= Pratyusha =

Pratyusha or Prathyusha is a feminine given name found among Indian people. Notable people with this name include:

- Prathyusha (1981–2002), Indian actress in Telugu and Tamil language cinema
- Pratyusha Banerjee (1991–2016), Indian television actress
- Bodda Pratyusha (born 1997), Indian chess Grandmaster
- Pratyusha Rajeshwari Singh, politician from Odisha state, India, serving since 2014

== See also ==
- Pratyush, the male variant
- Prathyusha Engineering College, an engineering college in Tamil Nadu, India founded in 2001
