= R. K. Kalaimani =

Indian director

- Occupation: Director
- Years active: 2000-2013

R. K. Kalaimani is an Indian film director who has worked on Tamil language films. He was active in the early 2000s and has worked on films featuring Prabhu and Vijayakanth.

== Career ==
Kalaimani apprenticed under directors including Arjun, Singeetham Srinivasa Rao and B. R. Vijayalakshmi, before making his directorial debut with the Prabhu starrer Thai Poranthachu (2000). He collaborated with the actor again in the following year, with the comedy drama Super Kudumbam (2001).

Kalaimani returned with Engal Aasan (2009), a drama film featuring Vijayakanth and Vikranth, with the team filming schedules around Vijayakanth's political commitments. In 2013, he made a film titled Apple Penne featuring newcomers in the lead roles, which had a low profile release and opened to poor reviews.

== Filmography ==
Year	Film	Notes
2000	Thai Poranthachu	
2001	Super Kudumbam	
2009	Engal Aasan	
2013	Apple Penne	
