= Chatrapatti, Madurai district =

Neighbourhood in Tamil Nadu, India

Chatrapatti is a village in madurai north Taluk in Madurai district of the Indian state of Tamil Nadu. This village has a police station, higher secondary school with lots of infrastructure, many sports players produced by this school and village, a river crossing this village above 100 acres of agricultural lands of rice and sugarcane, and is located 28 kilometres (17 mi) to the north from Madurai and 493.0 kilometres (306.3 mi) from Chennai.
