= K. S. Ravikumar =

Indian film director and actor

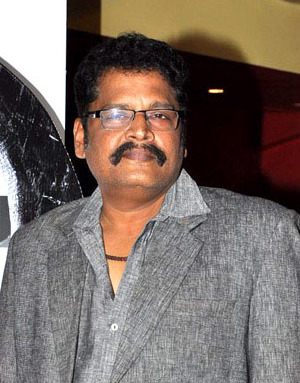
- Ravikumar in 2013
- Born: K. S. Ravikumar; 30 May 1958 (age 68); Vanganoor, Tamil Nadu, India
- Occupations: Film director, Film producer, Screenwriter, Actor
- Years active: 1990–present
- Spouse: Karpagam Ravikumar
- Children: 3

K. S. Ravikumar (born 30 May 1958) is an Indian film director, film producer, screenwriter and actor who primarily works in Tamil cinema and few Telugu films. He is one of the most commercially successful directors of Indian cinema. He has won many awards including one Filmfare Award South and five Tamil Nadu State Film Awards.

== Career ==
=== 1990–1997 ===
Ravikumar assisted various directors such as Bharathiraja, Vikraman, E. Ramdoss, Nagesh, Ramarajan and K. Rangaraj. Ravikumar worked as co-director on R. B. Choudary's production Pudhu Vasantham directed by Vikraman and the success of the film prompted the producer to give Ravikumar a chance to make his directorial debut. Ravikumar thus debuted as a film maker through Puriyaadha Pudhir (1990), a crime thriller starring Rahman and Raghuvaran. A remake of the Kannada film Tarka, the film won positive reviews upon release and remains as Ravikumar's only film outside the masala film genre. The success of the film meant that Ravikumar was able to expand his team of assistants and shortly after began work on a film under the same production house titled Pudhu Kaaviyam with Vikram in the lead role, though the venture was later shelved. He subsequently switched his genre of films to make a series of village action entertainers and regularly collaborated with actor Sarath Kumar, scoring successes with Cheran Pandiyan (1991) and Nattamai (1994), after which he became a highly sought after film maker in the Tamil film industry.

Ravikumar then signed on to make Muthu (1995), adapting Priyadarshan's Malayalam film Thenmavin Kombath, for a film produced by K. Balachander and starring Rajinikanth. Despite buying the official remake rights, he worked on his own screenplay, and the film consequently went on to gain "cult classic" status in India and Japan, as well as becoming one of the most profitable Tamil films till date at release. Soon after he worked with Kamal Haasan for the first time in Avvai Shanmugi (1996), an Indian adaptation of the American comedy film, Mrs. Doubtfire. The film, also featuring Meena and Gemini Ganesan, won positive reviews and performed well at the box office. The Hindu praised the film claiming "turns out to be entertainer, mouthful from start to finish". The success of his two films with the two leading Tamil actors prompted further opportunities in big productions in 1997, notably Vijayakanth's Dharma Chakkaram and the comedy Pistha featuring Karthik.

=== 1998–2010 ===
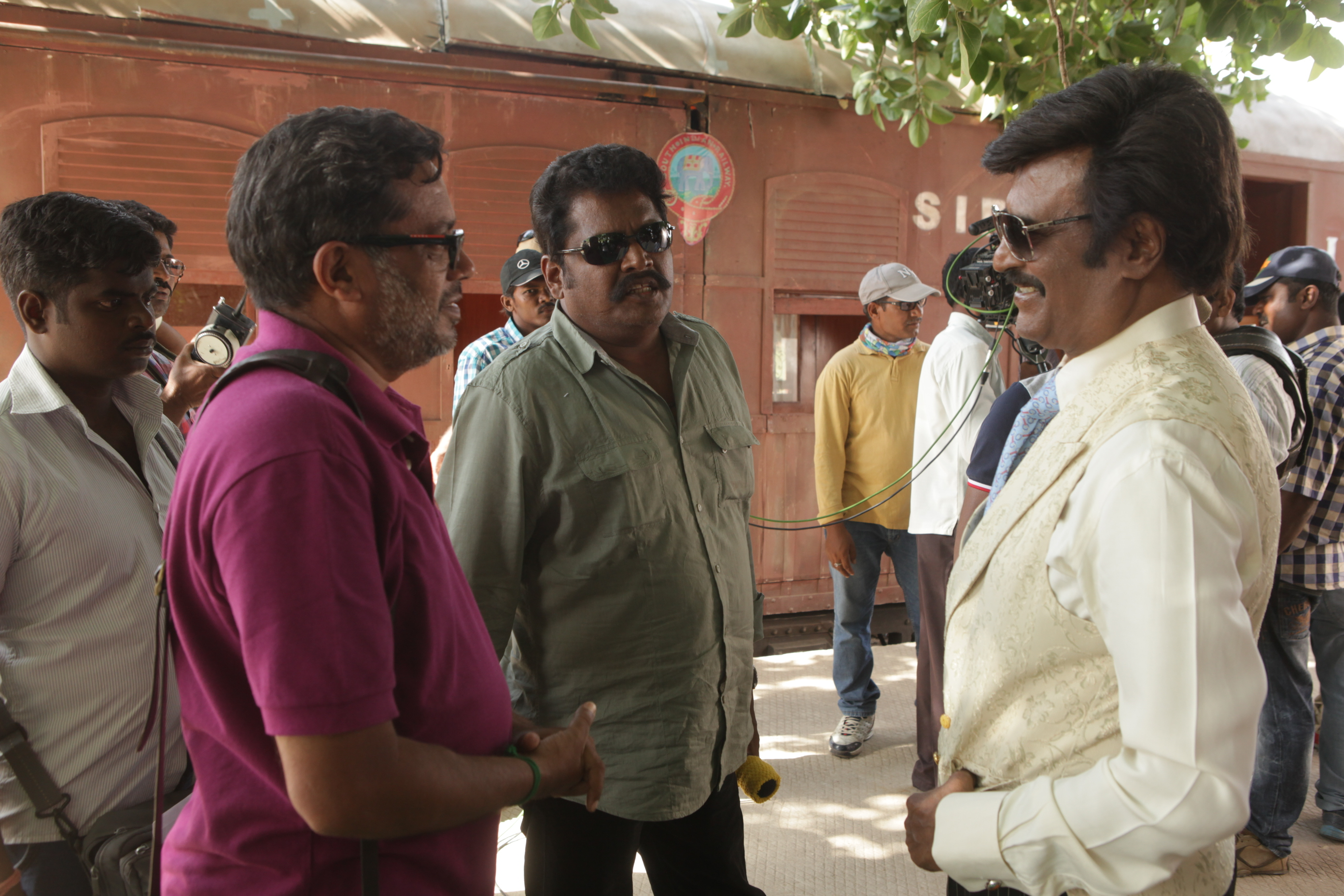
Ravikumar with Rajinikanth at Lingaa shooting

In December 1997, Ravikumar announced his next project Padayappa (1999) would feature Rajinikanth again as the lead actor with Sivaji Ganesan also in a pivotal role. Though principal photography for the film was supposed to have started in April 1998, the FEFSI strike that took place at that time delayed the project. After the strike ended, Ravikumar was able to complete Arjun's Kondattam and the successful drama with Sarath Kumar, Natpukkaga (1998). The film was further delayed when Ravikumar accepted to quickly remake Natpukkaga in Telugu as Sneham Kosam (1999) with Chiranjeevi in the lead. The shoot of Padayappa began in November 1998 and was subsequently completed in three months, with the film became a blockbuster upon release, as well as earning positive reviews from critics. Following the success of Padayappa, producer K. R. Gangadharan signed Ravikumar to direct a film and was insistent that the title should be Minsara Kanna (1999), after the popular song from Ravikumar's earlier film. His only collaboration with actor Vijay till date, the film opened to below average reviews collections. He then completed the village action film Paattali (1999) with Sarath Kumar within a month, as well as directing a portion of the record-breaking comedy drama Suyamvaram, bringing his release count for the year to five. Ravikumar consequently worked on his first home production through the comedy film Thenali (2000), starring Kamal Haasan in the titular role. While his wife Karpagam produced the film under his home studio RK Celluloids, Ravikumar worked on the screenplay and direction for the film also starring Jayaram, Jyothika and Devayani. Completing the film swiftly despite avid publicity, Thenali won critical and commercial acclaim, prompting grand felicitations of the director at the success meet. In 2001, he had two releases; the Telugu marital comedy Bava Nachadu and the family drama Samudhiram, in which he worked with Sarath Kumar again.

In 2002, Ravikumar made a third collaboration with Kamal Haasan through the comedy drama Panchathanthiram, which was produced by his manager P. L. Thenappan. Telling the story of five friends and a trip to Bangalore which goes awry, the film opened to rave reviews and made profits at the box office. Villain (2002), his first film featuring Ajith Kumar, was shot swiftly within forty days and also became a blockbuster upon release. He later remade the film in Telugu in 2003 under the same name with Rajasekhar in the lead role, after finishing Paarai (2003), another village action film with Sarath Kumar. In 2004, he began production on a third film starring Rajinikanth titled Jaggubhai. Ravikumar spent six months on pre-production works and missed out on the opportunity to direct Kamal Haasan in Vasool Raja MBBS during the period, but the film was later shelved after a photo shoot. Rajinikanth had asked for changes to the script and after several months of tinkering, the pair decided to part ways and abandon the project. He moved on to make Aethiree (2004), a film about an imposter gangster with Madhavan, before agreeing terms with NIC Arts to make a follow-up film with Ajith Kumar in three roles from November 2004, after Villain's success. Despite beginning production soon after the launch, financial problems meant that it progressed slowly and Varalaru, only had a theatrical release in late 2006. The film, however, won positive reviews and became the blockbuster hit for Ajith until that date. In between, he worked quickly on another action drama, Saravana (2006) with Silambarasan, a remake of the Telugu film Bhadra (2005).

Ravikumar collaborated with Kamal Haasan again in the high-budget venture Dasavathaaram (2008), where the actor portrayed ten different roles. Revealing that the film was an action adventure, encompassing mankind's concern for the environment, science and faith, Dasavathaaram became Ravikumar's most expensive and lengthy shoot till date. The film opened to positive reviews and became the most profitable Tamil film of 2008, with Ravikumar's work garnering a Filmfare Best Tamil Director Award nomination. Aadhavan (2009) featuring Suriya and Nayantara was his next release, and it saw him return to his standard "commercial packaging" and the film performed well at the box office. His shelved venture, the family-drama Jaggubhai (2010), re-began shoot with Sarath Kumar and Shriya Saran in mid 2008 but delays meant that the film was only released in January 2010, after a leaked copy had found itself online. He made a further collaboration with Kamal Haasan again in the romantic comedy Manmadan Ambu (2010), though the film opened to mixed reviews and collections.

=== 2013–present ===
After he completed his work, he began production on his first Hindi film, adapting director Hari's Tamil film Saamy (2003) in a venture titled Policegiri (2013) with Sanjay Dutt in the lead role. However, despite a high-profile launch, production was troubled as a result of Dutt's impending arrest. Subsequently, the film was rushed with Ravikumar only able to use ten days of Dutt's forty-day schedule for the film, and the director noted he mentally prepared himself for the subsequent box office failure. In January 2014, a felicitation event titled Endrendrum Ravikumar was held at the Nehru Indoor Stadium marking the director's 25th year in the industry and was attended by several of Ravikumar's contemporaries and colleagues. Following the completion of Kochadaiiyaan, Ravikumar began work on a new venture titled Lingaa (2014) with Rajinikanth, rather than reviving Rana. Signing on Anushka Shetty and Sonakshi Sinha in other lead roles, production began in May 2014 and period scenes were shot around sets in Karnataka. The film was completed in a period of 120 days, considerably shorter than any other film of equal budget or film starring Rajinikanth in recent times and opened to successful collections commercially. Prior to release, Ravikumar and his scriptwriter Ponkumaran, successfully evaded legal action from claims of plagiarism regarding the script. He has directed featuring Sudeep, Kotigobba 2 in Kannada language as the lead role. The film have been successful in their industry. He later directed two Telugu actions films with Nandamuri Balakrishna in Jai Simha (2018) and Ruler (2019).

He has since acted in several films and played the lead in Mathil (2021). In the science-fiction comedy Koogle Kuttappa (2022), the Tamil remake of the Malayalam film, Android Kunjappan Version 5.25, that has helped unearth the fine actor in director K. S. Ravikumar. As the hot-headed Subramani, the director-turned-actor effortlessly eases into the role whose success relies heavily on the chemistry he shares with the humanoid robot.

== Style of working ==
=== Production ===
Ravikumar's films are usually in the masala genre, with action, family sentiment, comedy, betrayal, revenge and redemption appearing as key themes. He consciously avoids marking experimental or art films, despite making his directorial debut with Puriyaadha Pudhir. Ravikumar has often associated with the same team of writers and assistants since his early career, with actor-director Ramesh Khanna being a near constant fixture in his team since a shelved venture titled Pudhu Kaaviyam was announced in 1990. Rather than considering his original storylines, Ravikumar has primarily gathered plots from other writers, refined them and adapted them into screenplays. He has regularly associated with Erode Soundar in village-based films, M. A. Kennedy in romantic comedies and Crazy Mohan in ventures featuring Kamal Haasan. Ravikumar often works on the script with his own story discussion team, away from his assistant directors, revealing that writing was "a personal process". However, for the production of Lingaa (2014), he revealed that the rush to finish the film by December 2014, meant he was unable to stay solely focused on the script and ventured out to help his assistants scout locations and arrange schedules.

Ravikumar is renowned for his quick schedules and his prompt completion of films, with Sify noting he is often considered a "film producer's delight" for being able to stay within time and budget allotments. He made an exception for his quick paced schedules with Dasavathaaram (2008), saying it was significantly more difficult to make than his previous ventures and involved extensive simultaneous CGI work to production. The shooting for Lingaa, one of the most expensive Tamil films to that point, was completed within 120 days. The duration was significantly smaller than any other Tamil film of equal budget, as well as for any recent film starring a leading actor, such as Rajinikanth, in the main role. Ravikumar has also made cameo appearances in most of his directorial ventures, likening them to Alfred Hitchcock's cameo appearances.

=== Approach to actors ===
Ravikumar has often chosen to work with established actors rather than newcomers, indicating that they are commercially more viable than newcomers, and are easier to handle them as they are more experienced. He has regularly worked on his scripts only after finalising the lead actor, adding changes in the original plot line in order to blend it into the actor's image. Describing his collaborations with Rajinikanth, Ravikumar noted he ensured that each scene was discussed with the actor during the making of Padayappa (1999) and that Rajinikanth decided exactly where to place punch dialogues in order to attract audiences. Referring to his work with Kamal Haasan, he noted that the actor would describe a detailed scene on how to make his core audience of "city-slickers" laugh during the making of Thenali (2000) and Panchatanthiram (2002), and then request Ravikumar to add a slapstick element to make it applicable to village audiences too. Ravikumar has also often collaborated with Sarath Kumar, who has since dedicated his success to the director's opportunities, with the pair working on several quickly shot village action films in the 1990s.

Ravikumar's temper with technicians has often been described to be "constantly on the edge", with assistant directors often remarking that Ravikumar yells regularly on set to ensure the production team work more efficiently. Director Cheran revealed that during his stint as an assistant director, he fell out with Ravikumar and was subsequently left out of the team of Purusha Lakshanam (1993) after irking the director.

== Filmography ==
Key
†	Denotes films that have not yet been released

=== As director and screenwriter ===
- Note: other than Suyamvaram, he wrote the screenplay of all of his films.

Year	Film	Language	Notes
1990	Puriyada Pudir	Tamil	Remake of Tarka
1991	Cheran Pandian	Tamil	
1991	Putham Pudhu Payanam	Tamil	
1992	Oor Mariyadhai	Tamil	
1992	Pondatti Rajyam	Tamil	
1993	Suriyan Chandran	Tamil	
1993	Band Master	Tamil	
1993	Purusha Lakshanam	Tamil	
1994	Sakthivel	Tamil	
1994	Nattamai	Tamil	Tamil Nadu State Film Award for Best Film; Tamil Nadu State Film Award for Best Director
1995	Muthukulikka Vaariyala	Tamil	
1995	Periya Kudumbam	Tamil	
1995	Muthu	Tamil	
1996	Parambarai	Tamil	
1996	Avvai Shanmugi	Tamil	
1997	Dharma Chakkaram	Tamil	
1997	Pistha	Tamil	
1998	Kondattam	Tamil	Also story writer
1998	Natpukkaga	Tamil	Filmfare Award for Best Film – Tamil; Tamil Nadu State Film Award for Best Film
1999	Sneham Kosam	Telugu	Remake of Natpukkaga; dual roles
1999	Padayappa	Tamil	Also story writer Tamil Nadu State Film Award for Best Film
1999	Suyamvaram	Tamil	
1999	Minsara Kanna	Tamil	
1999	Paattali	Tamil	
2000	Thenali	Tamil	25th film
2001	Bava Nachadu	Telugu	
2001	Samudhiram	Tamil	
2002	Panchathantiram	Tamil	
2002	Villain	Tamil	
2003	Paarai	Tamil	
2003	Villain	Telugu	Remake of the film of the same name
2004	Aethiree	Tamil	
2006	Saravana	Tamil	
2006	Varalaru	Tamil	Vijay Award for Favourite Director
2008	Dasavathaaram	Tamil	ITFA Best Director Award; Tamil Nadu State Film Award for Best Film; Nominated, Vijay Award for Favourite Film; Nominated, Vijay Award for Favourite Director; Nominated, Filmfare Award for Best Director
2009	Aadhavan	Tamil	Nominated, Vijay Award for Favourite Film; Nominated, Vijay Award for Favourite Director
2010	Jaggubhai	Tamil	
2010	Manmadhan Ambu	Tamil	
2013	Policegiri	Hindi	Remake of Saamy
2014	Lingaa	Tamil	Nominated, Vijay Award for Favourite Director
2016	Kotigobba 2	Kannada	Bilingual film
2016	Mudinja Ivana Pudi	Tamil	Bilingual film
2018	Jai Simha	Telugu	
2019	Ruler	Telugu	

=== As producer ===
Year	Film	Notes
2000	Thenali	Co-produced with R. Karpagam
2022	Koogle Kuttappa	Co-produced with Kallal Global Entertainment
2024	Hit List	Co-Produced With Ramesh Grand Creations

=== As writer ===
Year	Film	Director	Notes
2014	Kochadaiyaan	Soundarya Rajnikanth	

=== As actor ===
- All films are in Tamil, unless otherwise noted.

Year	Film	Role	Note
1986	Aayiram Pookkal Malarattum	Mohan's friend	Uncredited
1989	Raaja Raajathan	Priest	Uncredited
1990	Pudhu Vasantham	Watchman	Uncredited
1990	Puriyada Pudir	Cellmate	Guest appearance
1991	Cheran Pandian	Sundaram	
1991	Putham Pudhu Payanam	Sivalingam	
1992	Oor Mariyadhai	Rakappan	Guest appearance
1992	Pondatti Rajyam	Sandhegam	
1993	Suriyan Chandran		
1993	Madhumathi		
1993	Band Master	Band Master	Guest appearance
1993	Purusha Lakshanam	Photographer	Guest appearance
1994	Nattamai	Villager	Guest appearance
1995	Muthukulikka Vaariyala	Raja	
1995	Periya Kudumbam	Financial partner	
1995	Muthu	Landlord in Kerala	
1996	Avvai Shanmugi	Market man	Guest appearance
1997	Dharma Chakkaram	Inspector	Guest appearance
1997	Pistha	Devotee	Guest appearance
1997	Pagaivan	Durairaj	
1998	Kondattam	Photographer	Guest appearance
1998	Santhosham		
1998	Golmaal	ACP Bike Pandian & Chinna Pandi	Dual role
1998	Natpukkaga	Limping priest	Guest appearance
1999	Sneham Kosam	Airport passenger / Limping priest	Telugu film; Guest appearance (dual roles)
1999	Ponnu Veetukkaran	Jeeva's father	
1999	Padayappa	Guest at Anitha's birthday party	Guest appearance
1999	Minsara Kanna	Company GM	Guest appearance
1999	Paattali	Flower Decorator	Guest appearance
2000	Kannaal Pesavaa	Himself	Guest appearance
2000	Thenali	Himself	Guest appearance
2001	Bava Nachadu	ATV driver	Telugu film
2001	Dost	Boxing referee	Guest apperarance
2002	Thamizh	Police Inspector	
2002	Panchathantiram	Flight captain Kumar	Guest appearance
2002	Villain	Man requesting a photo	Guest appearance
2002	Kadhal Virus	Himself	Guest appearance
2003	Indru Mudhal	Dr. K. S. Ravikumar	
2003	Paarai	Building contractor	Guest appearance
2003	Villain	Himself	Telugu film
2004	Arul	Thirupathi	
2004	Aethiree	Bachelor	Guest appearance
2006	Thalai Nagaram	Assistant Commissioner	
2006	Thalaimagan		Guest appearance
2006	Saravana	Train passenger	Guest appearance
2006	Varalaru	Family doctor	Guest appearance
2007	Thottal Poo Malarum	Taxi driver	
2008	Dasavathaaram	Dancer	Special appearance in the song "Ulaganaygane"
2009	Satrumun Kidaitha Thagaval	Manickavel	
2009	Aadhavan	New servant	Guest appearance
2010	Vinnaithaandi Varuvaayaa	Himself	
2010	Jaggubhai	Airport supervisor	Guest appearance
2010	Manmadhan Ambu	Himself	Guest appearance
2013	Onbadhule Guru	DSP Balram Naidu	
2013	Policegiri	Drunk guest	Hindi film
2014	Ninaithathu Yaaro	Himself	
2014	Inga Enna Solluthu	Himself	
2014	Sigaram Thodu	Ravi	
2014	Aadama Jaichomada	K. Sathyamoorthy	
2014	Lingaa	"Finishing" Kumar	Guest appearance
2015	Thanga Magan	Vijayraghavan	
2016	Kotigobba 2	Dancer	Kannada film; cameo appearance in the title song
2016	Mudinja Ivana Pudi	Dancer	Cameo appearance in the song "Aisalamma"
2016	Rekka	Ratna	
2016	Remo	Himself	
2017	En Aaloda Seruppa Kaanom	Politician	
2017	Maayavan	Minister	
2017	Palli Paruvathile	Sarangan	
2018	Jai Simha	Court judge	Telugu film
2019	Ayogya	Head Constable Abdul Kader	
2019	Comali	MLA Dharmaraj	
2020	Ayya Ullen Ayya		
2020	Naan Sirithal	Dilli Babu	
2021	Mathil	Lakshmikanthan	
2021	Maaligai	O. K. Kumar	
2021	Obama Ungalukkaaga		
2022	Koogle Kuttappa	Subramani	
2022	Maayon	Vasudevan	
2022	Cobra	Nellaiappan	
2022	Miral	Rama's father	
2022	Varalaru Mukkiyam	Gopal	
2023	Ghosty	Dass	
2023	Japan	Minister Pazhanisamy	
2023	80s Buildup	Yama	
2023	Annapoorani	'Arusuvai' Annamalai	
2023	Sarakku	Judge	
2024	Lal Salaam	Ra. Sathyamoorthy	
2024	Aranmanai 4	DSP Jagadeesan	
2024	Saamaniyan	Murugavel	
2024	Vasco Da Gama	Uthaman & Binu	
2024	Andhagan	Dr. Sami	
2024	Kanguva	Nolasco Raposo	
2025	Rajabheema	Minister Mandranayagam	
2025	Dragon	Parasuram	
2025	School	Inspector Kaleeshwaran	
2026	Ustaad Bhagat Singh	Chief Minister Chandrasekhar Rao	Telugu film
2026	Kara	Kandhasaami	
2026	Love Oh Love	Rajendran	

=== Television ===
Year	Television show	Role	Network
2023	Kadhaippoma	Cameo	YouTube (Chapter - 10 )
2024	Super Singer Season 10	Guest	Star Vijay
2024	Sa Re Ga Ma Pa Seniors 4	Guest	Zee Tamil
