= Comagan =

Indian musician, actor, and philanthropist (died 2021)

Kalaimamani Comagan
- Born: 1972 or 1973
- Died: 6 May 2021 (aged 47–48)
- Genres: Playback singing, orchestra
- Occupations: Singer, composer
- Years active: 1991–2021
- Awards: Kalaimamani (2019)

Kalaimamani M. J. C. Comagan also spelt as either Comagan or Komagan (1972/1973 – 6 May 2021) was an Indian visually impaired musician, actor, educator and philanthropist from Tamil Nadu. He was best known for his appearance in the national award-winning song Ovvoru Pookalume which featured in the 2004 film Autograph. He ran the Comaganin Raaga Priya orchestra recording live stage performances.

== Career ==
Comagan pursued his career as a musician and composer starting up his own orchestra Comaganin Raaga Priya in 1991. He had also featured as a supporting actor in films such as Kanukkulle and Sura (2010) in minor roles. He made his film debut as music composer in the film Muthal Muthalai (2007). It also became the first ever Tamil film for which a visually impaired musician composed the entire soundtrack. Comagan was also a prominent integral part of the first ever Tamil Nadu Welfare Board for the Disabled which was established in 2008. He received the prestigious Kalaimamani award for the year 2019 from the Government of Tamil Nadu.

He had also reportedly conducted vocal and instrumental classes to students via online amid the COVID-19 pandemic.

=== Raaga Priya orchestra ===
Comagan founded the Raaga Priya orchestra in 1991 which was later known as Comaganin Raaga Priya. The orchestra was initially started with nine members and it was later expanded to around 25 members. The orchestra rose to limelight and prominence when they recorded a stage performance for about 16 hours continuously nonstop performing 183 songs. The milestone was recognized by the Limca Book of World Records. The Raaga Priya orchestra broke their own record in 2007 when they performed nonstop for about 50 hours with a group of 24 visually impaired musicians performing 682 songs. The performance was entered into the Guinness World Records.

The orchestra including its founder Comagan had performed over 3000 light music shows and also for fundraising charity purposes. The troupe had also toured to about nine countries and recorded stage performances. Raaga Priya received the Tamil Nadu State Award in 2006.

Raaga Priya orchestra members also made their entry in films when they performed in the national award-winning song Ovvoru Pookalume which featured in Cheran directorial Autograph. Comagan was lauded for his role as the conductor of the orchestra in the song and he had also reportedly sung the last few lines of the song "Manitha Un Manathai Keeri Vithai Podu Maramagum" alongside actress Sneha. According to the website of Raaga Priya orchestra, Comagan along with the troupe members gained wide reputation and gained popularity in the society only after director Cheran cast them in the film Autograph.

In addition, Raaga Priya orchestra also performed in Telugu-language song "Mounamgane Yedagamani" in Naa Autograph, the remake of Tamil film song "Ovvoru Pookalume" as well as in "Uyir Thantha Thaye" song which featured in 2007 film Pasupathi c/o Rasakkapalayam.

== Death ==
He died on 6 May 2021, at around 1 am, due to COVID-19 at the age of 48. He was hospitalized 12 days prior to his death.
