= Ottesi Cheputunna =

2003 Indian Telugu film

- DVD cover
- Directed by: E. Satthi Babu
- Screenplay by: E. Satthi Babu
- Dialogues by: Chintapalli Ramana
- Story by: Uday Raj
- Produced by: K. Anil Kumar
- Starring: Srikanth; Kaniha; Sivaji; Sunil
- Cinematography: C. Ramprasad
- Edited by: A. Sreekar Prasad
- Music by: Vidyasagar
- Production company: Sri Creations
- Release date: 11 April 2003
- Running time: 156 minutes
- Country: India
- Language: Telugu

Ottesi Cheputunna (transl. I swear and tell that) is a 2003 Indian Telugu-language romantic comedy-drama film directed by E. Satthi Babu. The film stars Srikanth, Kaniha (credited as Sravanthi), Sivaji and Sunil.

The film has music composed by Vidyasagar, cinematography by C. Ramprasad, and editing by A. Sreekar Prasad. Ottesi Cheputunna was released on 11 April 2003.

== Plot ==
Surya is the only child of two loving parents. He considers himself unlucky because he tends to lose whatever he wished for. Later, Surya loses both his parents in a car accident and is sent to an orphanage.

Surya grows to become an assistant manager in Corporation Bank. His childhood friend Nela Baludu joins the same bank as a peon. One day, Nela Baludu informs Surya that he was selected to be promoted as a manager, but it does not happen. Unhappy with his fate, a drunken Surya reaches his house to find a letter with a photo of an unknown girl. The letter asks for a reply. A careless Surya tears the letter into pieces. The following day, Surya wakes up and finds the girl to be beautiful. He reaches his office and learns that he has been promoted to manager. Surya considers the girl to be his lucky charm, but Nela Baludu brushes it off as a coincidence. Later, they see the girl on TV, and Surya anticipates that something good would happen to him. As expected, he receives a favorable judgement in his family's property dispute.

Surya is determined to find and marry the girl and offers Nela Baludu his flat if he helps him with it. They search all over Hyderabad and finally trace her address in Gachibowli thanks to a clue in the photo. They find out that the girl is Divya, and Surya manages to move into her penthouse by joining as Dileep's roommate. Divya, however, is already in love with Dileep for the past four years, but Dileep's unemployment acts as a hindrance to their marriage. Divya, who regards Surya highly, asks for his help to find Dileep a job so that they can marry. Surya unwillingly obliges but challenges God to marry Divya. To get rid of Dileep, Surya finds him a job in Dubai. Dileep politely rejects the offer saying that he wants to be in India with Divya. Divya gets angry at Dileep for rejecting the job but copes up with it nonetheless, vowing to marry him. Surya realizes that Divya is genuinely in love with Dileep and decides to sacrifice his love.

Nela Baludu is furious that Surya has given up on Divya for the sake of Dileep. He tries to badmouth Dileep, but all his efforts go in vain. It turns out that Dileep is in love with another girl, Rani, because she is rich. Nela Baludu tries to expose Dileep after knowing this, but Surya shuns him for lying. Meanwhile, Divya's parents propose Surya to marry Divya. Surya rejects the same by telling them about Dileep and Divya's love. Surya backs Dileep to get a job and convinces Divya's parents about their marriage.

Rani, on the other hand, asks Dileep to elope with her, leaving her property. Without property, Dileep chooses Divya over Rani. Still, he lies to Rani that he is ready to marry her. Divya and Dileep's wedding is fixed, and Divya accidentally meets Rani while distributing wedding cards. Divya invites Rani for her wedding, and they are surprised that both their fiances are named Dileep. Later, Rani arrives at Divya's wedding. Sensing the danger, Dileep diverts her by lying that he met with an accident with the help of his friend Venkat. Nala Baludu, nonetheless, gets hold of Rani. They expose Dileep on the wedding stage where Divya realizes Surya's love and the sacrifices he made for her. Divya and Surya unite.

== Cast ==
- Srikanth as Surya
  - Master Teja as young Surya
- Kaniha as Divya
- Sivaji as Dileep
- Sunil as Nela Baludu "Month"
- Anitha Patel as Rani
- Brahmanandam
- Ali
- M. S. Narayana as Reddy "Rena" Naidu
- L. B. Sriram as Rules Ranga Rao
- Babu Mohan
- Rajeev Kanakala as Venkat
- Banarjee as Surya's father
- Shanoor Sana as Surya's mother
- Sudha as Divya's mother
- Jaya Prakash Reddy as Veera Vankara Reddy
- Mallikarjuna Rao as Bank Clerk
- Raghunatha Reddy as Lawyer
- Kovai Sarala
- Kallu Chidambaram as the man asking for a loan in the bank.
- Krishna Bhagavaan
- Kondavalasa Lakshmana Rao
- Gautam Raju
- Jr. Relangi
- Asha Saini (special appearance in the song "Yelo Yelo Eluroda")

== Soundtrack ==
The soundtrack album consists of six singles composed by Vidyasagar and released on Aditya Music. Lyrics are written by Veturi, Sirivennela Seetharama Sastry, Bhuvana Chandra, and Chandrabose. The song "Yelo Yelo" was reused from "Vaadi Vaadi Naattu Katta" from Alli Thandha Vaanam (2001).

Ottesi Cheputunna (Original Motion Picture Soundtrack)
| No. | Title | Singer(s) | Length |
|---|---|---|---|
| 1. | "Vennello" | S. P. Balasubrahmanyam, Sadhana Sargam | 5:14 |
| 2. | "Kannathalli" | S. P. Balasubrahmanyam | 5:10 |
| 3. | "Bandar Lanti" | Shankar Mahadevan, Swarnalatha | 4:14 |
| 4. | "Otesi Cheputhunna" | Gopal, Sreenidhi | 5:01 |
| 5. | "Yelo Yelo" | Udit Narayan, Sujatha Mohan | 4:27 |
| 6. | "Padaharella" | Debashish, Sujatha Mohan | 4:29 |
| Total length: | | | 28:35 |

== Reception ==
Writing for Zamin Ryot, Griddaluru Gopalrao appreciated the screenplay. He stated that Sathhi Babu brought novelty to the story written by Uday Raj. Reviewing the performances, Gudipoodi Srihari of The Hindu wrote, "Srikanth, of late, is getting more opportunities to play lighter vein roles and this is one of them. Srikanth performs well. Debutante Sravanti is comfortable on screen. Sivaji has a slightly difficult role. His transformation into a villain is quite smooth," while appreciating the Vidyasagar's score and soundtrack. A reviewer from Sify called Ottesi Cheputunna a "sweet and watchable comedy."
