= Kaniha =

Indian Tamil actress

Kanika
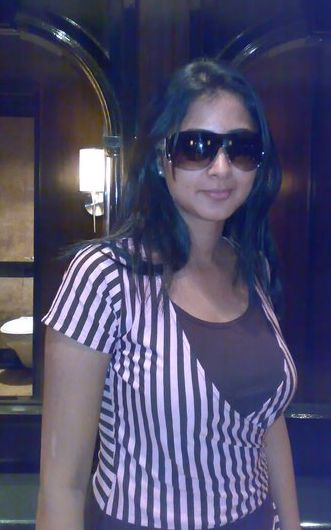
- Born: Divya Venkataraman; 3 July 1982 (age 44); Madurai, Tamil Nadu, India
- Other names: Kaniha, Sravanthi
- Education: BITS Pilani
- Occupations: Actress; Voice actor; Playback singer; TV anchor
- Years active: 2002-present
- Spouse: Shyam Radhakrishnan (m. 2008)
- Children: Sai Rishi
- Relatives: Jayashree (sister in law)

Divya Venkataraman, better known by her stage name Kaniha, is an Indian actress who predominantly works in Tamil cinema along with a few Malayalam, Telugu and Kannada movies. Kaniha made her debut in the 2002 Tamil film Five Star.

== Early life ==
Kanika was born 3 July 1982 as Divya Venkataraman in Madurai. Her father Venkata Subramaniam was an engineer. She won the Tamil Nadu State Award for Educational Excellence in 1999. She pursued her Mechanical engineering degree from 1999 to 2003 at BITS Pilani.

Having improved her singing talent since childhood by participating in pop music and light music shows, Divya was interested in performing arts. While she was still studying, she gave stage performances as a pop singer from time to time. When she was scheduled to perform at the Miss Chennai beauty pageant in 2001, she was selected to participate in the pageant after a model had backed out at the last minute. Despite lack of experience, she emerged victorious in the contest.

== Career ==
Susi Ganesan spotted Kanika on a magazine cover page and insisted on her performing the lead female role in his second feature film. Divya eventually entered the Film industry, accepting the offer, while her name was changed to Kanika. Her debut film was the Mani Ratnam-produced Five Star (2002) with Prasanna, who made his acting debut as well, in which Kaniha portrayed a traditional village girl. She completed the entire film during her summer holidays, since she was a student.

Kanika turned down all projects that were subsequently offered to her, including films by S. Shankar and P. C. Sreeram, and went on to complete her graduation. Even before she finished her graduation, she completed her Telugu debut film Ottesi Cheputunna during her winter vacations, acting under another stage name Sravanthi. In regard to her performance, Idlebrain wrote: "Sravanthy looks homely in the film and suited the character. She performed well. She is good at dances as well".

After completing her studies, Kanika decided to give herself a go at the Tinsel towns. She starred in the Kannada film Annavaru (2004), a remake of Mani Ratnam's Thalapathi (1991), stepping into Kannada filmdom, too. She followed the movie with a cameo role in Cheran's Autograph. Kaniha next appeared in a comedy oriented role in a commercial film by K. S. Ravikumar, Aethiree along with Madhavan, Sada, in which she portrayed a "naughty Brahmin girl". Sify labelled her performance in the film as "outstanding". She returned to Telugu cinema, accepting to reprise her role in the Telugu remake of Autograph, Naa Autograph, playing the same role as in the original version.

Kanika has ventured into playback singing and dubbing as well. Having a vast experience and being a professional singer before turning actress, Kanika got the offer to sing the theme song of her debut film Five Star. She then became a dubbing artiste, dubbing for actresses Genelia D'Souza in Sachein (2005), Sadha in Anniyan (2005) and Shriya Saran in Sivaji: The Boss (2007).

After her marriage, when she was supposed to bid adieu to the film industry, Kanika returned to Malayalam cinema in 2009, with the films Bhagyadevatha, directed by veteran Sathyan Anthikkad and starring Jayaram and Narain as well, and Pazhassi Raja, directed by reputed director Hariharan and starring Mammootty, Sarath Kumar and Padmapriya among others. While the former one, in which she played the role of a homely Christian girl, was highly successful at the box office, the latter one, a biographical historical film, in which she played the role of a queen opposite Mammootty. Her performance in Bhagyadevatha led to her winning several awards.

She was starred with Mammootty in Abrahaminte Santhathikal (2018) and Mamangam (2018). She working with Mohanlal and Prithviraj Sukumaran in the comedy drama Bro Daddy (2022).

She is best known for her stellar performance in the hit TV serial Ethirneechal (2022–2024). In a lesser-known but significant role, Kaniha made a cameo appearance in director Venkat Prabhu’s film The Greatest of All Time (2024), starring Vijay.

== Personal life ==
Kanika married Shyam Radhakrishnan, brother of Jayashree on 15 June 2008 who works as a US-based software engineer and had acted in the K. Balachander TV serial Premi. They have a son Sai Rishi born in November 2010. Initially she had decided to leave the film industry, finishing her career as an actress, and to settle down in the US, stating that she, however, would complete her hitherto signed films. In January 2009 then, Kanika, unexpectedly, announced her comeback with the Sathyan Anthikkad-directed Malayalam film Bhagyadevatha.

== Filmography ==
Key
†	Denotes films that have not yet been released

=== As actress ===
Year	Film	Role	Language	Notes
2002	Five Star	Eashwari	Tamil	
2003	Ottesi Cheputunna	Divya	Telugu	Credited as Sravanthi
2003	Annavaru	Subbulakshmi	Kannada	Credited as Sravanthi
2004	Aethiree	Gayathri Iyer	Tamil	
2004	Autograph	Thenmozhi Senthil	Tamil	
2005	Dancer	Divya	Tamil	
2006	Naa Autograph	Sandhya	Telugu	
2006	Sye	Renu	Kannada	
2006	Varalaru	Gayathri	Tamil	Nominated – Filmfare Award for Best Supporting Actress – Tamil
2006	Ennittum	Sneha	Malayalam	
2009	Bhagyadevatha	Daisy Benny	Malayalam	
2009	Rajakumari	Rajakumari	Kannada	
2009	Pazhassi Raja	Kaitheri Maakam	Malayalam	
2009	My Big Father	Ancy	Malayalam	
2010	Drona 2010	Tulasimani	Malayalam	
2011	Christian Brothers	Stella	Malayalam	
2012	Cobra	Annie	Malayalam	
2012	Spirit	Meera	Malayalam	
2012	Bavuttiyude Namathil	Mariam	Malayalam	
2013	Orissa	Chandrabhaga	Malayalam	
2014	To Noora with Love	Sainaba	Malayalam	
2014	How Old Are You	Susan David	Malayalam	Cameo appearance
2014	Mylanchi Monchulla Veedu	Waahida	Malayalam	
2015	Rudra Simhasanam	Mohini	Malayalam	
2015	O Kadhal Kanmani	Pregnant women	Tamil	Cameo appearance
2016	10 Kalpanakal	Sara	Malayalam	
2018	Abrahaminte Santhathikal	Diana Joseph	Malayalam	
2018	Drama	Mercy John Chacko (Kunjumol)	Malayalam	
2019	Lonappante Mamodeesa	Neelima	Malayalam	
2019	Mamangam	Chirudevi	Malayalam	
2022	Bro Daddy	Elsy Kurian	Malayalam	
2022	CBI 5: The Brain	Susan George / Ambika Unnithan	Malayalam	
2022	Paappan	Susan	Malayalam	
2022	Perfume: Her Fragnance	Abhirami	Malayalam	
2023	Yaadhum Oore Yaavarum Kelir	Kanagarani	Tamil	
2024	Weapon	Damini	Tamil	
2024	The Greatest of All Time	Abi Menon	Tamil	Special appearance
2024	Once Upon A Time in Madras	Kowsi	Tamil	Special appearance
2025	Niram Marum Ulagil	Fathima	Tamil	
2026	G.D.N	Ambalapara Krishna's wife	Tamil	

=== As dubbing artist ===
Year	Film	For	Language
2005	Sachein	Genelia D'Souza	Tamil
2005	Anniyan	Sadha	Tamil
2007	Sivaji: The Boss	Shriya Saran	Tamil

=== As playback singer ===
Year	Title	Film	Language	Composer	Notes
2002	"Engalukku"	Five Star	Tamil	Parasuram-Radha	
2021	"Thiruppavai"	Margazhi Thingal	Tamil	Ravi G	Also actress in the music album

== Television ==
=== Shows ===
Year	Program	Role	Channel	Language
2006	Kalakka Povathu Yaaru	Host	Vijay TV	Tamil
2007–2008	Mega Thangavettai	Host	Sun TV	Tamil
2008	Annual Chutti Vikatan Children's Quiz Show	Host	Sun TV	Tamil
2013	Sundari Neeyum Sundaran Njanum	Judge	Asianet	Malayalam
2015	Uggram Ujjwalam	Judge	Mazhavil Manorama	Malayalam
2016	comedy stars season 2	Judge	Asianet	Malayalam
2017	Grand Magical Circus	Judge	Amrita TV	Malayalam
2019	Kerala Dance League	Judge	Amrita TV	Malayalam
2020	Snehathode Veetil Ninnu	Herself	Mazhavil Manorama	Malayalam
2020	Health Desk	Herself	Asianet	Malayalam
2021	Red Carpet	Mentor	Amrita TV	Malayalam
2022	Vanakkam Tamizha	Guest	Sun TV	Tamil
2022	Cook with Comedy	Judge	Asianet	Malayalam
2023	Pongal Vilayattu	Participant	Sun TV	Tamil
2024–2025	Naanga Ready Neenga Ready Ah	Judge	Sun TV	Tamil
2025	Vanakkam Tamizha	Guest	Sun TV	Tamil
2025	Single Pasanga	Judge	Zee Tamil	Tamil

=== Serials ===
Year	Program	Role	Channel	Language	Notes
2008	Thiruvillayadal	Devi	Sun TV	Tamil	
2022	Mad Company	Podhum Ponnu	Aha	Tamil	Web series
2022–2024	Ethirneechal	Easwari Gunasekaran	Sun TV	Tamil	Won - Tamil Nadu State Television Awards for Best Character Actress
2024–2025	Ethirneechal Thodargiradhu	Easwari Gunasekaran	Sun TV	Tamil	Won - Indian Awards Television for Most Popular Actress

== Awards and nominations ==
Year	Film & TV shows	Award	Category	Result
2007	Varalaru	Filmfare Awards South	Filmfare Award for Best Supporting Actress – Tamil	Nominated
2010	Pazhassiraja	Asianet Film Awards	Special Jury Award	Won
2013	Bavuttiyude Namathil	Vanitha Film Awards	Best Supporting Actress	Won
2023	Ethirneechal	Behindwoods Gold Icons	Best Lead Cast On Television	Won
2023	Ethirneechal	Sun Kudumbam Viruthugal	Thanga Mangai	Won
2024	Ethirneechal	Ananda Vikatan Television Awards	Best Supporting Actress	Won
2025	Ethirneechal Thodargirathu	Sun Kudumbam Viruthugal	Thanga Mangai	Won
2026	Ethirneechal Thodargirathu	Indian Awards Television	Most Popular Actress	Won
2026	Ethirneechal	Tamil Nadu State Awards – Television	Best Character Actress –2022	Won

== See also ==
- List of BITS Pilani alumni
