= Naa Autograph =

- Directed by: S. Gopal Reddy
- Written by: Dialogues: Paruchuri Brothers; Satish Vegesna
- Screenplay by: Cheran
- Story by: Cheran
- Based on: Autograph by Cheran
- Produced by: Bellamkonda Suresh
- Starring: Ravi Teja; Bhumika Chawla; Gopika; Mallika; Kaniha; Prakash Raj
- Cinematography: Sameer Reddy
- Music by: M. M. Keeravani
- Production company: Sri Sai Ganesh Productions
- Release date: 11 August 2004
- Country: India
- Language: Telugu

Naa Autograph Sweet Memories (transl. My Autograph) is a 2004 Indian Telugu-language romantic drama film directed by S. Gopal Reddy. The film stars Ravi Teja alongside Bhumika Chawla, Gopika, and Mallika. Though the film had an above average run at the box office, with the years gone by it slowly gathered cult following due to its refreshing content, making and music. This film is a remake of the Tamil film Autograph. Gopika and Mallika reprised their roles from the original film. The film was also dubbed and released in Hindi as Thokar.

== Plot ==
The film begins with Seenu, who works in an advertising agency in Vijayawada, setting off on a journey, distributing wedding invitations for his forthcoming wedding. Along the way, he encounters various individuals from his past, who bring back memories of three women who have affected his love life.

First, Seenu returns to his village in Andhra Pradesh where he spent his childhood. He remembers his childhood antics, his school and his first love Vimala. After finishing school, Vimala got married and she never met Seenu again. In the present day, Seenu invites everyone from his village for his wedding including his friends, his old school master and Vimala, her husband and her three children.

Then, Seenu goes to a village in Kerala where he moved after his father Sriram, a postmaster, was transferred there. He had his college education there. He was constantly bullied by the students there as he did not know Malayalam, but eventually managed to become friends with a fellow student Satyam, whose mother tongue was also Telugu. Satyam served him as a translator. Seenu soon fell in love with Lathika, a Malayali girl. Lathika too reciprocated his feelings and soon their relationship becomes intimate. However, when Lathika's family discovered this, they expelled Seenu's family from the village and had her marry a local youth who also liked her. In the present day, Seenu reunites with Satyam in Kerala and invites him for his wedding. When they arrive at Lathika's house to invite her too, Seenu becomes upset to see that his former love had become a widow (her husband had died in a boating accident a couple of years prior).

After being expelled from the village in Kerala, Seenu and his parents moved to Hyderabad. Seenu had not got over Lathika and became an emotional wreck, and started to smoke and drink. He remained an emotional wreck until he met Divya, who worked in an advertisement agency headed by one Prakash. Divya, in fact, secured this job for Seenu after she saw him and his friend Bhagavan distributing pamphlets to the passengers in a bus, seeking job opportunities, hoping one of them may help them out in finding a job. Soon Seenu and Divya became close friends and Divya instilled confidence, unearthed his hidden talents and taught him the lesson that one has to proceed in life without looking back. Soon, Divya revealed that her widowed mother was a paralytic patient and that she worked to take care of her mother. As time passes by, she reveals that she was in love with someone and believed that he was the man of her life, but he cheated her. After Divya's mother died, she goes to orphanage and she lives with the orphanage children to build their carrier successful.

Finally, Seenu decided to marry a girl of his parents choice, Sandhya, for which he is distributing invitations in the present day. Everyone he invited, including Vimala, Lathika and Divya, attend his wedding. The film ends with Seenu reflecting on his life's journey to the audience.

== Cast ==
- Ravi Teja as Srinivas “Seenu”
  - Master Bharat as younger version of Seenu
- Bhumika Chawla as Divya, Seenu's best friend
- Gopika as Lathika, Seenu's love interest in Kerala
- Mallika as Vimala, Seenu's childhood lover
- Kanika in a special appearance as Sandhya, Seenu's wife
- Paruchuri Venkateswara Rao as Postmaster Venkatachalam Sriram, Seenu's father
- Chandra Mohan as Chandram, Seenu's friend, Divya and Sandhya's father
- Sudha as Janaki, Divya, and Sandhya's mother
- Vijaya Singh as Kamala, Seenu's mother
- Venu Madhav as Subba Rao aka Subbigadu, Seenu's childhood friend
- Dharmavarapu Subramanyam as Narayana Master, Seenu's friend master school
- Sunil as Satyam, Seenu's friend
- Prakash Raj as Ravi Prakash M.D Divya's boss, Lathika and Vimala's father
- Janaki Sabesh as Rajyalakshmi, Lathika and Vimala's mother
- Brahmanandam as Bangaraju, Seenu's friend
- Krishna Bhagavan as Bhagavan, a photographer, Seenu's friend
- Duvvasi Mohan as Mohan, Bhagavan's roommate
- Raja Ravindra as Suresh

== Production ==
The muhurat shot was held on 18 March 2004. After the success of the Tamil film Autograph (2004), Bellamkonda Suresh wanted to remake it into Telugu. Cinematographer S. Gopal Reddy turned director with this film.

== Soundtrack ==
The music was composed by M. M. Keeravani. The music was released under the Aditya Music label. Ajay Devgn attended the film's audio launch. A writer from The Hindu wrote that "VERY FEW times do music and lyrics appeal as a package. Naa Autograph reflects the brilliance of Keeravani and refreshing innovativeness of Chandrabose. While the tunes are soothing, lilting and most melodious, the lyrics are poetic and touching. And the singers are at their best".

The song "Mounamgane Yedagamani" also featured the performance of the members of Raaga Priya orchestra which also included its founder Comagan.

All lyrics are written by Chandrabose.

No.	Title	Singer(s)	Length
1.	"Mounamgane Yedagamani"	K. S. Chithra, M. M. Keeravani	5:19
2.	"Gurtukostunnayi"	KK	4:56
3.	"Duvvina Talane"	M. M. Keeravani, Sumangali	3:09
4.	"Manmadhude"	Sandeep, Ganga, M. M. Keeravani (Dialogues)	4:35
5.	"Gamma Gamma Hangamma"	S. P. Balasubrahmanyam, Srivardhini, Poornima	4:42
6.	"Nuvvante Pranamani"	Vijay Yesudas	3:57

== Critical reception ==
A critic from The Hindu opined that Gopika "is the most attractive one in the film, because of the touch of tradition and [her] performance" and praised Keeravani's music. A critic from Sify wrote that "The weird aspect of Naa Autograph is that there are no cinematic touches and the whole enterprise looks like a narcissistic affair! Consequently it becomes a Herculean effort to sit through the 165 minutes of the hero?s love life without lapsing into a siesta!" Jeevi of Idlebrain.com wrote that "This film is one example of remakes where the body is imported successfully without the soul".
