= Ovvoru Pookalume =

Song by Bharadwaj

from the album Autograph
- Released: 2004
- Recorded: Chennai, India
- Genre: Film score
- Label: Mass Audios
- Songwriter: Pa. Vijay
- Producer: Cheran

"Ovvoru Pookalume" (transl. Every Flower) is a Tamil language song from the soundtrack of the Indian film Autograph performed by Indian performer K. S. Chithra and composed by Bharadwaj in the raaga Sindhu Bhairavi. The song also featured the performance of the members of Raaga Priya orchestra which also included its founder Comagan.

== Overview ==
This song is placed in the movie's slot when an alcohol addicted youth is not having a hope about his life and the song makes some changes in him.

The song is picturised as being performed by Raagapriya—an orchestra group consisting of visually-impaired musicians. The timing of the song in the movie, lyrics and the picturisation seek to inspire the viewers to achieve something in life.

As it has a lot of inspirational quotes for youths, the lyrics of the song is added to the Madurai Kamaraj University's syllabus

== Awards ==
- Singer K. S. Chithra won National Film Award for Best Female Playback Singer for this song in May 2004.
- Lyricist Pa. Vijay won National Film Award for Best Lyrics for the song in May 2004.

== Other versions ==
The song was retained in the Kannada remake My Autograph (2006) as "Araluva Hoovugale" and Chitra won the Filmfare Award for Best Female Playback Singer – Kannada. The song's background music was reused in the film Care of Footpath (2006).
