= Bhagyadevatha =

2009 Indian film

- Poster
- Directed by: Sathyan Anthikkad
- Screenplay by: Sathyan Anthikkad
- Story by: Rajesh Jayaraman
- Produced by: M. M. Hamsa S Saifudeen
- Starring: Jayaram; Narain; Kaniha
- Cinematography: Venu
- Edited by: K. Rajagopal
- Music by: Ilaiyaraaja
- Production company: Kalasangham Films
- Distributed by: Kalasangham Films
- Release date: 1 April 2009
- Country: India
- Language: Malayalam
- Budget: ₹2.5 crore

Bhagyadevatha (transl. Goddess of luck) is a 2009 Indian Malayalam-language comedy-drama film written and directed by Sathyan Anthikkad from a story by Rajesh Jayaraman. It features Jayaram, Kaniha, Innocent, and Narain.

== Plot ==
Benny Chacko, a cable operator, is driven by an ambition to become wealthy. Acting on a suggestion from a friend, he decides to marry in hopes of receiving a substantial dowry to fulfill his dreams. He marries Daisy, but is dismayed to learn that her father has been unable to arrange the agreed-upon dowry. Though angered, Benny chooses to wait a few months before taking further action.

He informs Daisy that until the dowry is paid, their marriage will remain unconsummated. Three months pass, but Daisy's father is still unable to meet the financial demand. Frustrated, Benny sends Daisy back to her parental home, telling her family she can return only once the dowry is arranged.

Daisy and her family are deeply saddened by his actions but feel powerless. Benny's own family is also disappointed by his behavior, yet they too remain unable to intervene.

One day, Benny learns that Daisy has won a lottery worth two crore rupees. Seeing her newfound wealth, he tries to win her back, but Daisy firmly rejects all his attempts. Benny begins to suspect that she may be considering remarriage.

At the same time, Benny's sister, Sofie, develops a relationship with her colleague, Roshan. Eventually, both families come to know about the relationship. After some initial resistance, Roshan's mother agrees to the marriage but asks for a dowry of ten lakh rupees.

Benny tries hard to arrange the amount but fails. On the day of the wedding, overwhelmed and unable to face anyone, he leaves home. His friend Kunjabdulla finds him and brings him back. When they return, they see that the wedding preparations are in full swing and that the dowry has already been provided to Roshan's family.

Benny then learns that it was Daisy who gave the dowry. Despite how poorly he had treated her and her family, she had generously helped them. Realizing the depth of her kindness, Benny feels deep remorse and asks for her forgiveness. Daisy forgives him, and they reunite.

== Cast ==
- Jayaram as Benny Chacko
- Kaniha as Daisy Benny
- Narain as Sajan Joseph
- Samvrutha Sunil as Selin Sajan
- Nikhila Vimal as Sali Chacko
- Innocent as Mathew Palakkal
- Nedumudi Venu as Sadanandan Pillai
- Reshmi Boban as Laila, Pareethu's daughter
- K. P. A. C. Lalitha as Annamma Chacko
- Mamukkoya as Pareethu
- Venu Nagavalli as Anto
- Vettukili Prakash as Charlie
- Lakshmi Priya as Sofia
- Santhakumari as Nabeezumma
- P. Sreekumar as Puthumana Achan Fr. Zachariah
- Lakshmi Sanal
- Manjusha Sajish
- Vanitha Krishnachandran as Rosy
- Rugmini as Theyyamma, Benny's grandmother
- Sethu Lakshmi
- Deepika Mohan as Leelamma
- Manoj Nair as Hassankutty
- Sherly as Reetha
- Manjulan as Roshan

== Soundtrack ==
Bhagyadevatha's songs and background score are composed by Ilaiyaraaja. The lyrics were written by Vayalar Sarathchandra Varma. The music album has three songs:

Track	Song title	Singer(s)
1	"Allipoove Mallipoove"	Vijay Yesudas, Swetha Mohan
2	"Swapnangal Kannezhuthiya"	Rahul Nambiar, K. S. Chitra
3	"Aazhi Thira Thannil"	Karthik

== Reception ==
Sify gave film a three star-rating and the verdict good. The music score by Illayaraja was appreciated by Indiaglitz.com.

== Box office ==
The movie was commercially successful.
