= Pa. Vijay =

Indian poet (born 1974)

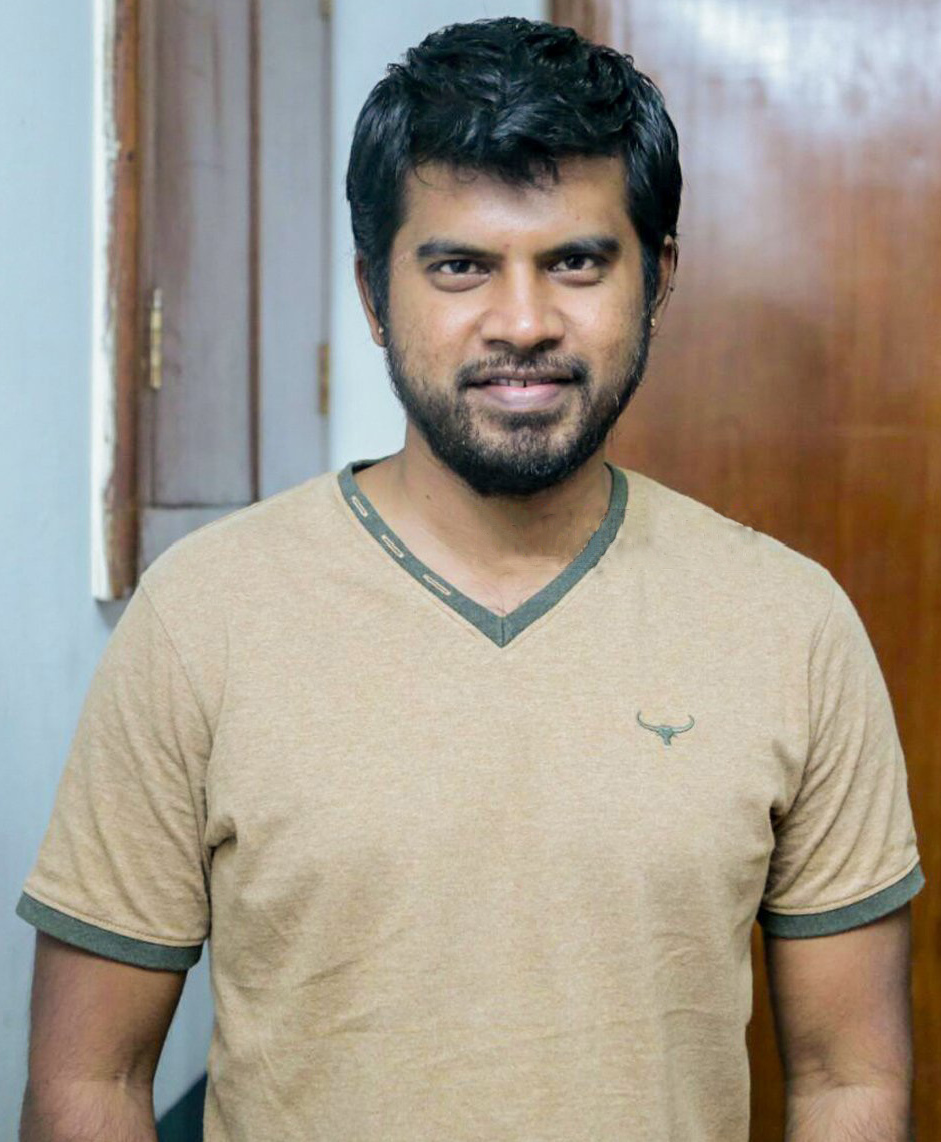
- Born: Balakrishnan Vijay; 20 October 1974 (age 51); Coimbatore, Tamil Nadu, India
- Occupations: Poet, lyricist, writer, actor, director, producer
- Spouse: Lena
- Children: 2
- Writing career
- Pen name: Vithaga Kavignar
- Language: Tamil
- Period: 1996–present
- Notable awards: Kalaimamani Award (2006)

Pa. Vijay is an Indian lyricist, poet, writer, director, producer and actor who predominantly works in Tamil cinema. He won the National Film Award for Best Lyrics in India for his song Ovvoru Pookalume in Cheran's Autograph (2004).

== Career ==
Vijay is a native of Jayankondam but grew up in Coimbatore where his father Balakrishnan was working with the national raw factory as a spinning man. His mother Saraswathi was a teacher in a government school in Coimbatore. He met K. Bhagyaraj through his brother, who was a family friend and worked with him in films and his magazine, Bhagya. Vijay made his debut as lyricist in Gnanapazham in 1996 and went on to write many popular songs.

Vijay was originally supposed to make his acting debut with Thaai Kaaviyam however the film was shelved after the launch. He then made his acting debut with Gnabagangal (2009) for which he also wrote the script.

Vijay then acted in Ilaignan (2011), scripted by M. Karunanidhi where he was portrayed as a bonded labour of a ship. Vijay made his debut as producer and director with Strawberry (2015). He wrote the dialogue for the Tamil dubbed version of the Telugu film Rudhramadevi (2015). Pa Vijay, plays as a TV reporter in Nayyapudai (2016). In 2018, he made his second film Aaruthra (2018). For his third directorial venture, Aghathiyaa (2025) is a horror fantasy drama which stars Jiiva and Arjun in the lead roles.

== Awards ==
- Kalaimamani Award - 2006

== Filmography ==
=== As a lyricist ===
Year	Film	Song(s)
1996	Gnanapazham	"Manimaada Kuyile"
1998	Vaettiya Madichu Kattu	All Songs except "Kichu Kichu Thamboolam"
1999	Ullathai Killathe	"Naan Musolini", "O Nenje" and "Nee Engey"
1999	Nee Varuvai Ena	"Paarthu Paarthu"
1999	Kadhal Solla Vandhen	"Sembaruthi Poove", "Shavina Shavina" and "Solla Vandhen"
2000	Vanathai Pola	"Engal Veetil Ella Naalum", "Nathiye Nayil Nathiye" and "Rojapoo Maalaiyile"
2000	Thai Poranthachu	"Ulagathil Ulla"
2000	Kannan Varuvaan	"Kadala Kaattu Kuyile", "Kaatrukku Pookal" and "Kooda Mela"
2000	Unnai Kodu Ennai Tharuven	"Idduppu Selaikkulla", "Unnai Kodu Ennai Tharuven" and "Sateliteil Yeri"
2000	Vetri Kodi Kattu	"Karupputhan Enakku Pidicha"
2000	Unnai Kann Theduthey	"Poo Poovaa", "Theduthe Unnai Kann" and "Vaada Vaada"
2000	Priyamanavale	"June July Maadhathil"
2000	Thenali	"Swaasame"
2000	Snegithiye	"Dhevathai Vamsam Neeye"
2001	Nageswari	"Ennidam Ennidam Vaa"
2001	Engalukkum Kaalam Varum	"Vennai Thirudum Kanna"
2001	Ullam Kollai Poguthae	"Kavithaigal Sollava", "Uyirae Enuyirae", "Puyale Puyale", "Oru Palaivanathai", "Kathavai Naan", "Anbe Anbe and "Adadaa Adadaa"
2001	Piriyadha Varam Vendum	"Dikki Dikki Lona" and "Vasco Da Gama"
2001	Rishi	"Kaatrodu Puyalai" and "Nilavai Konjum"
2001	Thaalikaatha Kaaliamman	"Laser Kathir Pole"
2001	Paarvai Ondre Podhume	"Yeh Asainthadum", "Thuli Thuliyaai" and "Thirumba Thirumba"
2001	Vinnukum Mannukum	"Unakenna Unakenna"
2001	Dumm Dumm Dumm	"Athan Varuvaga"
2001	Aanandham	"Gokulathil Seethai"
2001	Love Channel	"Desingu Raja", "Cherry Cherry" and "Sudithar Soodi Vantha"
2001	Lovely	"I Na Sabai", "Silve Nilavae" and "Vinodhamanavale"
2001	Dhill	"Dhill Dhill" and "Machan Meesai"
2001	Narasimha	"Egipthu Raani"
2001	Kalakalappu	"Ottava Sinungi"
2001	Viswanathan Ramamoorthy	
2001	Vedham	All songs except 'Malai Kaatru'
2001	Samudhiram	"Pine Apple"
2001	Manadhai Thirudivittai	"All Day Jolly Day", "Azhagaana Sooriyan", "Kutti Kutti Pani Thuliye" and "Sadugudugudu Aadathey"
2001	Nandhaa	"Amma Endrale"
2001	Thavasi	"Desingu Rajathan" "Thanthana Thanthana" and "Yele Imayamalai"
2001	Azhagana Naatkal	All songs except 'Kadhal Ok'
2001	Ladies and Gentleman	"Alai Alaiyai", "Jeya Jeya Kumba" and "Vennilave"
2001	Mr. Narathar	"Hey Vinmeene" and "Osho Baby"
2001	Naan Paada Ninaipathellam	"Anbe Kangalale", "Enna Enna", "Millenium Paadal" and "Nyabagam"
2001	Kadhal Galatta	"Yei Thoda Thoda", "Yetho Yetho Ennil" and "Mella Mella Vandhachu"
2002	Pammal K. Sambandam	"Dindukallu Poota"
2002	Punnagai Desam	"Doli Doli"
2002	Vivaramana Aalu	"Vaadaa Vaadaa Paalkaaraa"
2002	Shakalaka Baby	"Velvettu Devathai"
2002	Dhaya	"Thorakatha Pottiye"
2002	Charle Chaplin	"Muthalam Santhippil", "Ava Kanna Partha" and "Maamu Maamu"
2002	Junior Senior	All songs except "Anandham Pennukulle"
2002	Thulluvadho Ilamai	All songs except "Kannmunne"
2002	Unnai Ninaithu	"Ennai Thalattum", "Yaar Indha Devathai", "Yaar Indha Devathai" II, "Sil Sil Silala", "Ennai Thalattum" (solo) and "Pombalainga Kadhal"
2002	Pesadha Kannum Pesume	"Oh Nila", "Vinnaivittu" and "Chikkango"
2002	Raja	"Singari Singari" and "Chinna Chinna Silmishangal"
2002	Karmegham	"Sri Ranga Pattanam"
2002	Run	"Ichutha Ichutha"
2002	Sundhara Travels	"Malligai Poovukku" and "Adada Oor Kulathil"
2002	Maaran	All songs
2002	Namma Veetu Kalyanam	"Andha Vaanam Vittu"
2002	Samasthanam	All songs except 'Penne Penne'
2002	Bagavathi	"July Malargale"
2002	April Maadhathil	"Manase Manase" and "Sight Adippom"
2002	I Love You Da	"Kaatril Parandhuvandha" and "MTV Paarthuputta"
2002	Jaya	"Gundu Bangara Goli"
2002	Mutham	"Saturday Sunday"
2002	Bala	"Bailamo Bailamo" and "Theendi Theendi"
2002	Kadhal Virus	"Enthan Vaanin"
2002	Style	All Songs except 'Pottu Eduthu'
2003	Dhool	"Ithanundu Muthathile" and "Inthadi Kappakelange"
2003	Anbe Sivam	"Mouname Paarvayai"
2003	Chokka Thangam	"En Jannal" and "Ettu Jilla"
2003	Ramachandra	"Chinna Chinna" and "Thillaiyaadi"
2003	Vaseegara	"Aaha En Parkal", "Marriage Endral" and "Nenjam Oru Murai"
2003	Anbu	"Aval Yaraval"
2003	Yes Madam	"Samimelai Sathyam"
2003	Military	"Ammamma" and "Suriyane"
2003	Dum	All songs except 'Kannamma Kannamma'
2003	Punnagai Poove	"Jogging Seiyum Ceaser", "Thilaakkaeni Ganaa" and "En Kadhal"
2003	Well Done	"Thee Thee" and "Kathadicha"
2003	Indru Mudhal	All songs
2003	Pudhiya Geethai	"Manase" and "Mercury Poove"
2003	Parthiban Kanavu	"Buck Buck Buck" and "Adadaa Adadaa"
2003	Parasuram	"Dolna Dolna"
2003	Priyamaana Thozhi	All songs except Rojakkale
2003	Aahaa Ethanai Azhagu	"Aahaa Ethanai Azhagu"
2003	Kadhal Kisu Kisu	"Chinna Chinnathai" and "Kabadi Kabadi"
2003	Alaudin	"Yendi Ennai"
2003	Thennavan	"Desa Kaatre" and "Englishil Paadinaa"
2003	Diwan	"Ayyayyo", "Gundu Pakkara" and "Konjam Konjama"
2003	Boys	"Girl Friend" and "Dating"
2003	Thiruda Thirudi	"Mutham Mutham"
2003	Alai	"Solakattu Bommai" and "Thinga Kizhamaiyaana"
2003	Aalukkoru Aasai	"Iduppodu Sungidi"
2003	Winner	All songs except "Kozhi Kokkara"
2003	Thirumalai	"Dhimsu Katta"
2003	Kurumbu	All songs except "Aasai Nooru Vagai"
2003	Anbe Un Vasam	"Ore Oru Paarvaiyaal"
2003	Kadhal Kirukkan	"Paruva Thiruda"
2003	Joot	"Vedi Veesuran"
2003	Unnai Paartha Naal Mudhal	"Azhage Azhagallo", "Enge Aval", "Kadhal Kadhal Suduma" and "Neeye En Swasam"
2004	Engal Anna	"Konji Konji"
2004	Jai	"Kanna Simittina" and "Shockadikkuthu"
2004	Pudhukottaiyilirundhu Saravanan	"Baby Baby", "Where Do We Go" and "Naatu Sarakku"
2004	Varnajalam	"Oh Baby"
2004	Autograph	"Ovvoru Pookalume" and "Meesa Vecha Perande"
2004	Kangalal Kaidhu Sei	"Anarkali" and "Azhagiya Cinderella"
2004	Gambeeram	"Kannin Maniye", "Sembaruthipoove" and "Sambalkadu"
2004	Kuthu	"Otha Viral Kattuna"
2004	Ghilli	"Appadi Podu", "Sha La La" and "Kadhala Kadhala
2004	Aethirree	"Saithane Saithane" and "Ichu Thaariyaa"
2004	Perazhagan	"Kaatru Enbatha"
2004	Jana	"Poochandi Vanthutta" and "Thakathimi Thakathimi"
2004	Maanasthan	"Kaatha Naatha", "Vaada Thambi" and "Un E Mail"
2004	Sullan	"Adho Varaa" and "Kilu Kiluppaana
2004	Madhurey	"Elantha Pazham" and "Ice Katti"
2004	Gajendra	All songs except 'Gaja Varanda'
2004	Giri	"Kisu Kisu Manusa", "Dei Kaiya Vechukuttu" and "Dubukku Dubukku"
2004	M. Kumaran S/O Mahalakshmi	"Tamizh Nattu Maanava"
2004	Oru Murai Sollividu	"I Love You Solli"
2004	Bose	"Enna Enna Aachu" and "Vaitha Kann"
2004	Chatrapathy	"Nee Ragasiyamaga"
2004	Manmadhan	"Oh Mahire" and "En Aasai Mythiliye"
2004	Neranja Manasu	"Muthukulichi"
2004	Maha Nadigan	"Vayase Vayase"
2004	Aai	"Aai Mailapuru"
2004	Jaisurya	All songs
2004	Jananam	"Neethaane Emmele"
2004	Kadhal Thiruda	"Thiruda Thiruda"
2004	Manathil	"Mama Mama" and "Santhana Poove"
2005	Aayudham	"Hormone Surrakuthu" and "Koottaan Choru"
2005	Ayya	"Oru Vaarthai", "Suthipoda Venama" and "Thamiraparani Rani"
2005	Devathaiyai Kanden	"Azhage Brammanidam" and "Velakku Onnu"
2005	Anbu Sagotharan	All Songs
2005	Kannadi Pookal	"Hey Chillu Chillu", "Konjam Aasai" and "Dey Vasu"
2005	Ji	"Ding Dong"
2005	Maayavi	"Maayavi Maayavi"
2005	London	"Atho Atho" and "Badavaa"
2005	Kicha Vayasu 16	"Sila Neram" and "Solla Mudila"
2005	Thaka Thimi Tha	"Hoodibaba", "Kanne I Love You" and "Onna Roundu"
2005	Chandramukhi	"Athinthom"
2005	Priyasakhi	"Chinna Magaraniye" and "Mudhal Murai"
2005	Sachein	"Va Va Va En Thalaiva"
2005	6'2	"Maatengudhu", "Napoleya" and "Pottuthaka"
2005	Arinthum Ariyamalum	All Songs except "Yela Yela"
2005	Girivalam	"Nee Yaaro Nee Yaaro" and "Solvaaya Solvaaya"
2005	Ullam Ketkumae	"Kanavugal"
2005	Kaatrullavarai	"Naa Unnai Nee Ennai"
2005	Chinna	"Bailare Bailare" and "Tholaidhoora Nilave"
2005	14 February	"Nanba Nanba"
2005	Daas	"Yennoda Raasi", "Saami Kittay", "Shaheeba Shaheeba" and "Vaa Vaa"
2005	Varapogum Sooriyane	
2005	ABCD	"Anandin Arimugam", "Bharathiyin Arimugam", "Chandravin Arimugam" and "Divyavin Arimugam"
2005	Alaiyadikkuthu	"Mercury Baby"
2005	Ponniyin Selvan	All Songs except "Siru Thooral"
2005	Andha Naal Nyabagam	"Vaadi Vaadi"
2005	Thirudiya Idhayathai	All Songs except "Onnu Rendu"
2005	Ambuttu Imbuttu Embuttu	"Chella Thiruda"
2005	Majaa	"Hey Pangali","Ayyarettu Naattukettu", "Podhumadaa Saami"
2005	Aanai	"Hey Idupattum", "Kumru Kumrur" and "Midukkanavaney"
2005	Aaru	"Thottutea"
2005	Vetrivel Sakthivel	"En Chella"
2005	Sandakozhi	"Mundasu Sooriyane"
2005	Vanakkam Thalaiva	"Aandavan Kodutha"
2005	Kadhalanathey	"Nila Onnu"
2005	Unnai Enakku Pidichuruku	"Muthamitta Udhadugal"
2005	Aasa Vatchaen	"Masthu Masthu"
2006	Paramasivan	"Undivila"
2006	Saravana	"Gori Thera"
2006	Aathi	All Songs except "Ennai Konja Konja"
2006	Madrasi	"Yendha Ooro" and "Oru Unmai Sollava"
2006	Oru Kadhal Seiveer	"Mutham Koduda" and "Gigu Gimba"
2006	Mercury Pookal	All songs
2006	Pattiyal	All songs
2006	Kokki	"Ivana Yevana" and "Ore Oru Sogam"
2006	Thalai Nagaram	"City of Sins" and "Soo Matharakali"
2006	Kalinga	"Oruthi"
2006	Kusthi	"Masala Maharani" and "Roottu Pudichom"
2006	Thodamale	"Kadhal Oru" and "Kadhalanna"
2006	Yuga	All Songs
2006	Unakkum Enakkum	"Something Something"
2006	Thimiru	"Kattikko Rappa Rappa" and "Mani Mani"
2006	Nee Venunda Chellam	"Ennada Athisayam" and "Ethanai Jenmam"
2006	Em Magan	"Purinchiducha Purinchiducha"
2006	Jambhavan	"Halwa Ponnu"
2006	Kedi	"Aadhivasi Naane", "Kunguma Poove", "Kedi Paiya", "Kungumam Kalainthathe", "College Life Da" and "Chumma Chumma"
2006	Latchiyam	"Neruppai Endrum", "Star Vandha", "Vaada Vaada" and "Yaarum Illai"
2006	Rendu	"Yaaro Evalo"
2006	Sivappathigaram	"Kalloori Salaikkul", "Maari Magamaayi", "Mannarkudi Kalakalakka" and "Poranthiruchi Kalam"
2006	Nenjil Jil Jil	"Kannukkul Kalavaram", "Punnagaiye" and "Unakkagathaane"
2006	Nenjirukkum Varai	"Azhagana Ponnuthan" and "Kichu Kichu Moottadhada"
2006	Poi	"Hitler Penne", "Inge Inge Oru Paatu", "Kutti Kutti Kavithai" and "La La La"
2006	Uyir Ezhuthu	"Sithada Kattikittu"
2007	Pokkiri	"Dole Dole", "Nee Mutham Ondru" and "En Chella Peru"
2007	Lee	"Ada Naan Oru Mathiri Da" and "Yaaru Yaaru"
2007	Muni	"Assah Pussah", "Gulla Gulla Dracula" and "Varranda Muni"
2007	Maya Kannadi	"Konjam Konjam"
2007	Unnale Unnale	"June Ponal", "Mudhal Naal", "Unnale Unnale", "Ilamai Ulasam" and "Siru Siru Uravugal"
2007	Madurai Veeran	"Kalaiyum Neeye", "Mudhal Mudhalaga" and "Uyirum Uyirum"
2007	Naan Avanillai	"Kaakha Kaakha", "Aen Enakku Mayakkam", "Macha Kanni" and "Nee Kavidhai"
2007	Parattai Engira Azhagu Sundaram	"Nee Rasthali Palam"
2007	Ninaithaley	"Konji Konji"
2007	Thiru Ranga	"Onnu Rendu", "Ivane Ivana" and "Pollachi"
2007	Nee Naan Nila	"Kadhal Kadhal" and "Madham Pudicha"
2007	Pirappu	"Ithu Thaana Kadhal" and "Yaaradicha Yaaradicha"
2007	Sivaji	"Style"
2007	Thullal	"Kollathe"
2007	Aarya	All Songs
2007	Oru Ponnu Oru Paiyan	"So Sweet Da"
2007	Marudhamalai	"Hey Yenmama" and "Yenna Velay"
2007	Azhagiya Thamizh Magan	"Nee Marilyn Monroe" and "Maduraikku"
2007	Arai Enn 305-il Kadavul	Adada Daa
2007	Machakaaran	All songs except "Nee Nee Nee"
2007	Billa	All songs
2008	Bheemaa	"Oru Mugamo" and "Rangu Rangamma"
2008	Valluvan Vasuki	"Oor Oranga", "Sollamma" and "Thamarapoo"
2008	Thotta	"Mugam Poo" and "Venum Venum"
2008	Theekuchi	
2008	Vedha	"Ayyo Azhage"
2008	Arasangam	"Cindrella" and "Adelaru Acham"
2008	Santosh Subramaniam	"Senthamizh Pesum Azhagu Juliet"
2008	Arai En 305-il Kadavul	"Adada Daa"
2008	Kuruvi	"Palaanadhu" and "Mozha Mozhannu"
2008	Aayudham Seivom	"Nene Pettaiku" and "Innum Oru"
2008	Vallamai Tharayo	"Megam Illamal" and "Unnaithan"
2008	Kuselan	"Sollu Sollu"
2008	Sathyam	"Aaradi Kaathe" and "Ada Gada Gada"
2008	Dhaam Dhoom	"Pudhu Pudhu", "Thikku Thikku", "Uyyaalalo Uyyaalalo" and "Yaaro Manathile"
2008	Alibhabha	"Ara Ara Sambo" and "Krishna Krishna"
2008	Raman Thediya Seethai	"DJ DJ Disca Podu"
2008	Sakkarakatti	"Chinnamma", "Naan Epodhu" & "I Miss You Da"
2008	Aegan	"Yahoo Yaho", "Hey Baby" and "Kichu Kichu"
2008	Mahesh, Saranya Matrum Palar	"Thajam Thajam", "Vizhiyil Vizhiyil" and "Yaarathu Yaarathu"
2008	Naan Aval Adhu	"Kadhal Oru Kaatru"
2008	Kangalum Kavipaduthey	"Sollumvarai Kadhal"
2008	Dhik Dhik	"Uyir Ezhuthe"
2009	Villu	"Nee Kobapattal"
2009	Kadhalna Summa Illai	"Jai Sambo", "One Way" and "Juram"
2009	Padikathavan	"Hey Vetri Velaa" and "Raanki Rangamma"
2009	1977	"Arabi Kadal", "Hawai Theevil" and "Ore Oru"
2009	Ayan	"Oyaayiye" and "Honey Honey"
2009	Guru En Aalu	"Vaanam Vanthu", "Chellame Chellamae" and "Alaipayudhey"
2009	Mariyadhai	"Devathai Desathil" and "Unnai Ninaithen"
2009	Sarvam	All songs
2009	Thoranai	"Vaa Chellam" and "Manjasela Mandakini"
2009	Manjal Veiyil	All songs
2009	Maasilamani	"Dora Dora" and "O Divya O Divya"
2009	Muthirai	"Night Is Still Young" and "Night Is Still Young (Remix)"
2009	Unnai Kann Theduthe	"Kagetha Pooveni" and "Oh Nathiya"
2009	Sindhanai Sei	"Sindhanai Sei"
2009	Arumugam	All songs except 'Aarumugam'
2009	Aadhavan	"Hasile Fisiliye"
2009	Naan Avanillai 2	"Manmadha Leelai" and "Naangu Kangal"
2009	Ilamai Idho Idho	"Kuthu Paattu"
2010	Theeradha Vilaiyattu Pillai	All songs except 'Theeradha Vilaiyattu Pillai'
2010	Pen Singam	"Sil Silla Sil Silla"
2010	Enthiran	"Kilimanjaro" & "Pudhiya Manitha"
2010	Chikku Bukku	"Chikku Bukku", "Zara Zara", "Smile" and "Adi Saarale"
2011	Kaavalan	"Vinnai Kaapan"
2011	Siruthai	"Adi Rakkamma Rakku"
2011	Ilaignan	All songs
2011	Seedan	All songs except 'Enadhu Uyirai'
2011	Mappillai	"Onnu Rendu"
2011	Ko	"Aga Naga and Venpaniyae"
2011	Sadhurangam	"Ennanna" and "Enna Thandhi"
2011	7aam Arivu	"Oh Ringa Ringa" and "Innum Enna Thozha"
2011	Maharaja	"Hello Nanbaa"
2011	Kadhal 2 Kalyanam	"Enakkaga Unakkaga"
2012	Nanban	"Irukaana Illaiyaana Eliyana"
2012	Kalakalappu	All songs
2012	Mirattal	"Muga Moodi Pota Nilavie" and "Radio Radio"
2012	Maatraan	"Theeye Theeye"
2012	English Vinglish	All songs
2012	Ajantha	"Yaarum Thodatha Ondrai"
2012	Thuppakki	"Poi Varavaa" and "Alaikaa Laikka"
2013	Kodi	"Manmadhana", "Dhiluse" and "Kavithai Nethane"
2013	Puthagam	"Italica" and "Say That You Love Me"
2013	Alex Pandian	"Rayya Rayya"
2013	Vatthikuchi	"Amma Wake Me"
2013	Theeya Velai Seiyyanum Kumaru	All Songs
2013	Raja Rani	"Angnayaade", "Oday Od", "Imaye Imaye"
2013	Aarambam	All songs
2014	Oru Kaathal Oru Mootha	"Crystal Venila"
2014	Athithi	"Jaipuril.. Jaipuril", "Oru Vidai Theiriyamal"
2014	Balu Thambi Manasile	"Neethana"
2014	Thagadu Thagadu	"Oru cd Muppadhu Rooba", "Naan Naanaaga Illai"
2014	Kaviya Thalaivan	"Aye Mr.Minor", "Yaarumila", "Sollividu Sollividu" & "Sandi Kuthirai"
2014	Irumbu Kuthirai	"Hello Brother"
2014	Aranmanai	"Peeche Peeche", "Sonnathu Sonnathu"
2014	Yaan	"Latcham Calorie"
2014	Kaththi	"Nee Yaaro"
2014	Velmurugan Borewells	"Intha Ponnu Nenjil"
2014	Azhagiya Pandipuram	"Nenje Nenje"
2014	Mei Maranthean	"Isthanbul"
2014	Kadhal Solla Aasai	"Madai Thiranthu", "Thamizhachi"
2015	Nannbenda	"Nee Sunno New Moono"
2015	Sagaptham	"Enakkanavan"
2015	Strawberry	All songs
2015	Yatchan	All Songs
2015	Rudhramadevi	All songs
2016	Theri	"Eena Meena Teeka"
2016	Oru Melliya Kodu	All songs
2016	M.S. Dhoni: The Untold Story (Tamil)	All songs
2016	Vaaraayo Vennilaave	"Kannadi Parkkama", "Unnidam Ondrai", "Yuir Ennum", "Intha aylesa"
2017	S3	Oh Sone
2017	Yaakkai	"Ennullae" and "Naan Ini Kaatril"
2017	Thiruttu Payale 2	All songs
2017	Aakkam	"Solla Solla"
2018	Marainthirunthu Paarkum Marmam Enna	
2018	60 Vayadu Maaniram	"Iraivinai Thedi"
2018	Aaruthra	All songs
2019	Sindhubaadh	"Unnalathan"
2019	LKG	"Dappava Kizhichaan", "Tamizh Anthem", "Ini oru vidhi seivom"
2019	Kazhugu 2	"Yelamala Kaathu"
2019	Nerkonda Paarvai	"The Theme - Thee Mugam Dhaan" and "Agalaathey"
2019	Action	"Nee Sirichalum", "Maula Maula"
2019	Hero	"Aayiram Mugangal", "Overa Feel Pannuren" and "Hero Title Track"
2020	Mookuthi Amman	All songs
2021	Aranmanai 3	"Sengaandhale"
2022	Clap	"Konjam Chellama" and "Kaatrile Yeri Vaa"
2022	Veetla Vishesham	All songs
2022	Coffee with Kadhal	"Baby Gurl", "Naalaya Pozhudhu", "Maatram", "Hi Hello", "Baby Gurl" (Reprise)
2022	Maamanithan	"Thattiputta", "Ye Rasa", "Pannapurathu"
2022	The Legend	"Mosalo Mosalu"
2022	Cobra	"Adheeraa" and "Yele Ilanchingame"
2023	Makka Makka	"An independent music video with Music by Harris Jayaraj, sung by Sathyaprakash & Bamba Bakya"
2024	Indian 2	"Paaraa"
2024	Kozhipannai Chelladurai	"Yelay Yelay" and "Kaiyenthi"
2024	Devara: Part 1 (D)	"Ayudha Pooja"
2025	Madha Gaja Raja	"My Dear Loveru", "Nee Dhana Nee Dhana" and "Thumbakki Thumbai"
2025	Nesippaya	"Sol Nee Sol", "Tholanja Manasu" and "Solo Violin"
2025	Gangers	"Kuppan"
2026	Karuppu	"Karuppa Kooda Vaa" and "Aathi Raasathi"

=== Other roles ===
Year	Film	Director	Writer	Producer	Actor	Role	Notes
2009	Gnabagangal	No	Yes	Yes	Yes	Kadhiravan aka Meerapriyan	
2011	Ilaignan	No	No	No	Yes	Karky Arokkyasamy	
2015	Strawberry	Yes	Yes	Yes	Yes	Saravanan	
2015	Rudhramadevi	No	Dialogues	No	No		Tamil version
2016	Nayyapudai	No	No	No	Yes	Vijay	
2016	Appa	No	No	No	Yes	Himself	Guest appearance
2018	Aaruthra	Yes	Yes	Yes	Yes	Shivamalai (Shiva)	Also singer for song "Puli Onnu"
2021	Kalathil Santhippom	No	No	No	Yes	Himself	Guest appearance
2024	Thiru.Manickam	No	No	No	Yes	Himself	Guest appearance
2025	Aghathiyaa	Yes	Yes	No	No		
2026	Anantha	No	Dialogues	No	No		

== Television ==
=== TV Serials ===
- 2004 Kalki
- 2004 Manaivi
- 2004 Krishna Cottage
- 2005 Selvi
- 2006 Arasi
- 2006 Lakshmi
- 2006 Jaiyam
- 2007 Vasantham
- 2007 Porantha Veeda Puguntha Veeda
- 2007 Manjal Magimai
- 2008 Namma Kudumbam
- 2008 Rudhra
- 2008 Bharathi
- 2008 Sivasakthi
- 2008 Senthoora Poove
- 2009 Chellamay
- 2009 Rudhra
- 2009 Karunamanjari
- 2012 Merku Mambalathil Oru Kaadhal
- 2012 Paartha Gnabagam Illayo
- 2012 Aaha
- 2013 Vani Rani
- 2013 Mahabharatham
- 2015 Naagini
- 2018 Vinayagar
- 2018 Maya
- 2018 Lakshmi Stores
- 2019 Pandavar Illam
- 2019 Magarasi
- 2019 Chocolate
- 2020 Poove Unakkaga
- 2020 Vanathai Pola
- 2021 Aruvi
- 2021 Kayal
- 2022 Priyamaana Thozhi
- 2022 Sevvanthi
- 2022 Anandha Ragam
- 2023 Pudhu Vasantham
- 2023 Poova Thalaya

=== Reality shows ===
Year	Show	Role	Channel	Ref.
	Nenje Ezhu	himself	Kalaignar TV	
