= Ginger (2013 film) =

2013 Indian film

- Film poster
- Directed by: Shaji Kailas
- Written by: Rajesh Jayaraman
- Produced by: Jagadeesh Chandran
- Starring: Jayaram; Muktha George; Mallika
- Cinematography: Raja Ratnam
- Edited by: K. Sasi Kumar
- Music by: S. P. Venkatesh
- Production company: Kichu Films
- Release date: 2 November 2013
- Country: India
- Language: Malayalam

Ginger is a 2013 Indian Malayalam-language comedy road film directed by Shaji Kailas and written by Rajesh Jayaraman. It stars Jayaram, Muktha George, Mallika, Sudheesh, Jagadish, Suresh Krishna and Siddique. The film was released on 2 November 2013 to positive reviews, coinciding with the Diwali fest.

== Plot ==
The film tracks the life of an individual named Vivekanandan who is cheated by everyone and put in a pool of debts followed by frauds. He makes many attempts to pull himself out of the mess and takes revenge on the people who did harm to him, forms the rest of the story.

== Cast ==
- Jayaram as Vivekanandan
- Siddique as District Chief Judicial Magistrate K. C. Kuriakose
- Sudheesh as Najeeb Kecheri
- Muktha George as Roopa
- Mallika as Devika
- Jagadish as Sethumadhavan
- Suresh Krishna as Harinarayanan
- Kailash as Venkida Krishnan (Venkidi)
- Irshad as Mohan Menon
- P. Balachandran as Palathara Balakrishnan
- Lakshmi Gopalaswamy as Molykutty
- Kaviyoor Ponnamma as Vivekanandan's mother
- Kalasala Babu as Elamuttam Pappachan
- Priyanka Anoop as Shivakami
- Vijayaraghavan as IG Mathew Tharakan IPS (Cameo Appearance)
- Tini Tom as CI Radhakrishnan
- Santhosh as SI Ajith Kumar
- Anoop Chandran as Keshavan
- Lakshmi Priya as Geetha
- Thesni Khan as Saathi
- Manka Mahesh as Pappachan's wife
- Indrans (Cameo Appearance)
- Sidhartha Siva (Cameo Appearance)

== Critical reception ==
The film received mostly positive reviews from critics.
