= Ozhimuri =

2012 film by Madhupal

- Theatrical release poster
- Directed by: Madhupal
- Written by: Jeyamohan
- Produced by: P. N. Venugopal
- Starring: Lal; Asif Ali; Bhavana; Mallika; Shwetha Menon
- Cinematography: Alagappan N.
- Music by: Bijibal
- Production company: PNV Associates
- Distributed by: PNV Associates
- Release date: 7 September 2012 (India)
- Running time: 127 minutes
- Country: India
- Language: Malayalam

Ozhimuri (transl. divorce record) is a 2012 Indian Malayalam-language period drama film directed by Madhupal and written by Jeyamohan. The film stars Lal, Mallika, Asif Ali, Bhavana, and Shwetha Menon. The music was composed by Bijibal.

The film received critical acclaim but underperformed at the box office. It was selected for the Indian Panorama section at the 43rd International Film Festival of India. It has been described by critics as one of the notable films of the Malayalam New Wave cinema movement.

The film is based on the book Uravidangal by Jeyamohan. It explores the matrilineal system that existed in the Nair community in the former region of Travancore. In this system, property and lineage were historically traced through women, and divorce was formally recorded using documents known as ozhimuri, or divorce records written on palm leaves.

The narrative examines the transition from a matrilineal to a patrilineal social structure in the mid-20th century and its impact on gender roles and family systems in the region.

== Plot ==
The story exposes the ego clashes and complexities of a period through the eyes of its lead character Thanu Pillai (Lal), who witnesses the tale of three women, his mother, wife, and son's wife.

Fifty-five-year-old Meenakshi Pillai who is married to seventy-one-year-old Thanu Pillai files for divorce from her husband and demands the return of the properties he had her transfer in his name during their marriage. Advocate Balamany, the defense lawyer, tries to convince Meenakshi and her son Sarath Chandran to withdraw the case on various occasions. Sarath tells her that his father was abusive and harsh towards him and his mother. He also tells her about Kali Pillai, Thanu Pillai's mother, who was lord of a feudal family which followed matrilineal succession and had considerable power in the local politics and among people. Thanu Pillai was also very harsh towards his mother and even hated the matrilineal system. Hence, he married Meenakshi from a Nair family which followed the patrilineal system. Even though Meenakshi was from a poorer family, Kali Pillai loved her and even advised her many times to take a stronger stand against her husband instead of submitting to patriarchy. However, Meenakshi remained submissive to her husband all through their marriage. Sarath and Balamany slowly develop a relationship.

As the case progresses, more and more things from the past are revealed from the perspectives of various people in Thanu Pillai's life. Meenakshi lived through this cycle of abuse because she knew that her husband deeply loved his son. It is also revealed that the only reason Sarath is alive and in good health is because of his father. This makes Sarath change his view towards Thanu Pillai. It's also revealed that Sivan Pillai, Thanu Pillai's father, was a wrestler who died penniless because Kali Pillai divorced him to live with a younger, educated man. This scarred a young Thanu Pillai deeply, causing him to be harsher towards his mother and become abusive towards his wife even though he loved both of them. Kali Pillai before her death asks Meenakshi to call Thanu Pillai but he refuses to see her, which causes Kali to storm out of the house and die in the streets. Thinking about his mother's death caused Thanu Pillai to suffer a heart attack later a few months ago. After recovering, he asks his wife what caused his mother to leave the home, accuses his wife of hurting his mother, and even calls her a slave. This affects Meenakshi, driving her to file for divorce. She tells Balamany that she wants to live and die independently like her mother-in-law.

Thanu Pillai suffers another heart attack but he is cared for by Meenakshi and recovers. The next day in court, Thanu Pillai, Sarath, and Balamany are hopeful that Meenakshi Amma will withdraw her divorce petition as she took care of Thanu Pillai when he was ill. But she insists in court that she wants a divorce. A pained Thanu Pillai agrees to all demands of Meenakshi in court. On his way back home with Sarath, he reveals to his son that he was abusive towards Meenakshi and Kali Pillai because he was afraid of them due to his father's fate. He tells his son that Balamany is a strong woman and approves of their relationship, but also advises him to never be scared of her, and that fearing his wife made him try to put her under his feet always, which was a mistake. When they reach home, Thanu Pillai and Sarath are surprised to find Meenakshi at home. She has prepared a sweet dish and hands it to Thanu and says she will come to look after him when he is not well, but not as a wife. Meenakshi, a free woman now, spends the rest of her life in the house Kali Pillai had gifted her, with pride and self-respect like Kali Pillai did.

== Cast ==
- Lal as Thanu Pillai and his father Sivan Pillai (Double role)
- Asif Ali as Sarath Chandran, Thanu and Meenakshi's son
- Mallika as Meenakshi Pillai
- Bhavana as Adv. Balamani, Thanu Pillai's lawyer
- Shwetha Menon as Thengumpura Veettil Kali Pillai Kochamma, Thanu Pillai's mother
- Balaji Sarma as mahout Murugan, Meenakshi's elder brother
- Jagadish as Adv. Nanu Nair, Meenakshi's lawyer
- Ilavarasu as Vaidyan
- M. R. Gopakumar as Thanu Pillai's uncle
- Kochu Preman
- Nandu as Thanu Pillai's servant
- Sudheer Karamana as a local mahout

== Production ==
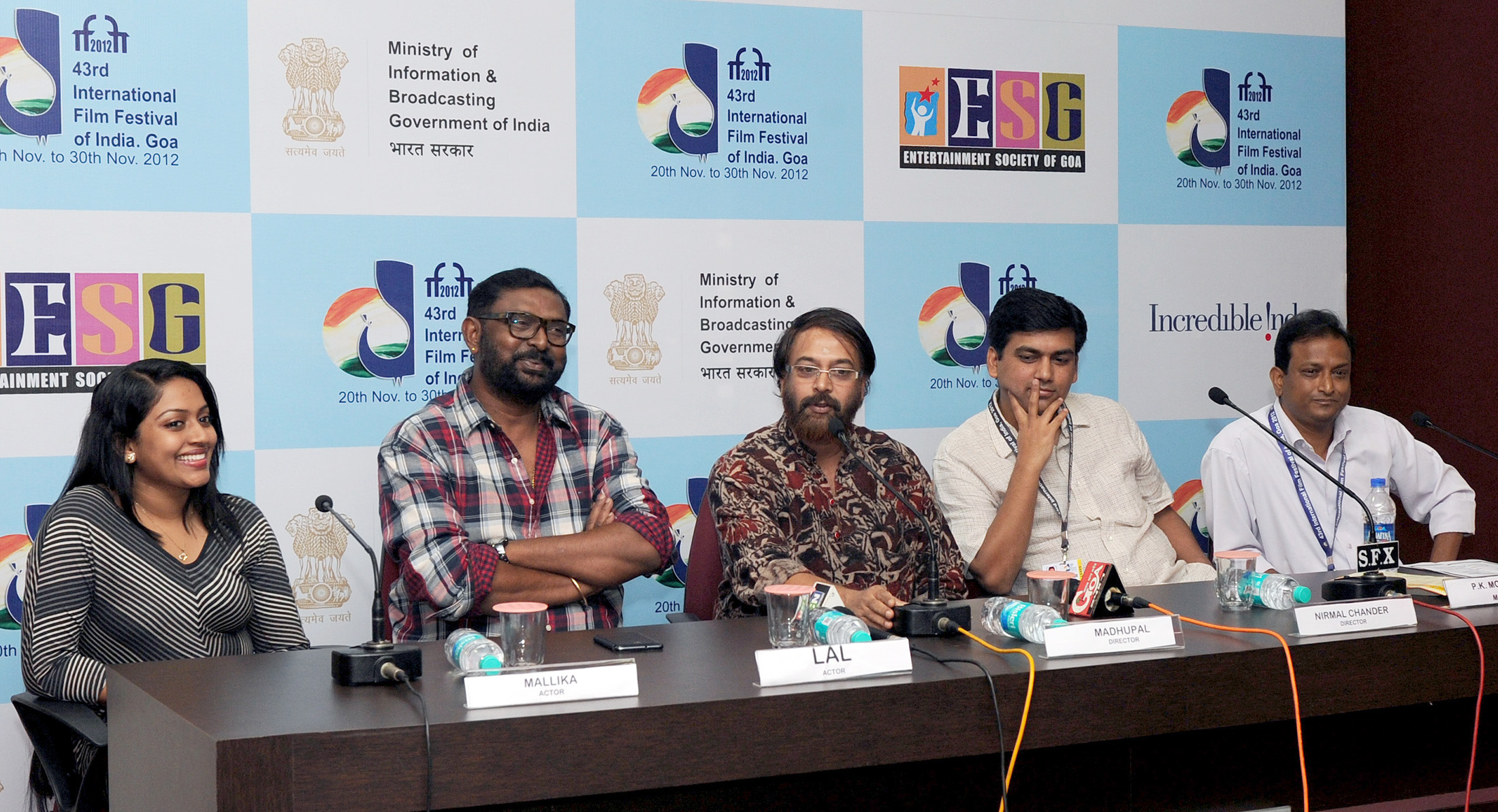
Press conference by the Director, Madhupal, Actress Mallika Film “Ozhimuri” and Nirmal Chander, Director of the Film “Dreaming Taj Mahal”, at the 43rd International Film Festival of India (IFFI-2012), in Panaji, Goa

Earlier it was reported that Padmapriya was selected to play one of the three female lead. But later Mallika replaced her. Actor-turned-director Madhupal invited 65 fresh faces in the age group of 10–70 years for this film.

== Reception ==
=== Critical response ===
Ozhimuri released with positive response.Metromatinee.com gave positive review with a verdict : "Impressive".Nowrunning.com gave 3/5 stars and concluded saying that "Ozhimuri burns slowly, spurting off those sparks every now and then, and even when the smoke and fire appears to have died out, you sense that crimson embers lie glowing and buried deep inside."IBN Live gave a mixed review by saying that the movie is "Satisfying".

== Accolades ==
- Best Second Film of the Year 2012 Kerala State Government Film Award
- Best Film 2012 Pearl Award Qatar Kerala Film Producers Film
- Best Director Award Jaihind Television 2012 film
- Best Director award Doordharsan Nirav award film
- Best Second Film Kerala Film Critics Award 2012 of the movie
- Best Actor Special Jury National award Government of India to Lal film
- Director of Excellence award from Indonesia Film Festival 2013 film
- Best Actor Lal Kerala Film Critics Award 2012
- Best Actress Swetha menon Kerala film critics award 2012
- Best Director of Photography Azhagappan Kerala Film Critics Award 2012
- Best Music Director Kerala state Government film award Bijibal 2012
- Best Costumer SB Satheeshan Kerala State Government Film Awards 2012
- Best Scriptwriter B Jeyamohan Kerala Film Critics Award 2012

Ceremony	Category	Nominee	Result
2nd South Indian International Movie Awards	Best Film	P. N. Venugopal	Nominated
2nd South Indian International Movie Awards	SIIMA Award for Best Director	Madhupal	Nominated
2nd South Indian International Movie Awards	SIIMA Award for Best Cinematographer	Azhagappan	Nominated
2nd South Indian International Movie Awards	Best Actor	Lal	Nominated
2nd South Indian International Movie Awards	SIIMA Award for Best Actress in a Supporting Role	Shweta Menon	Won
2nd South Indian International Movie Awards	SIIMA Award for Best Actress in a Supporting Role	Mallika	Nominated
60th Filmfare Awards South	Best Film	P. N. Venugopal	Nominated
60th Filmfare Awards South	Best Director	Madhupal	Nominated
60th Filmfare Awards South	Best Actor	Lal	Nominated
60th Filmfare Awards South	Best Actress	Shweta Menon	Nominated
