= Mallika (actress) =

Indian actress

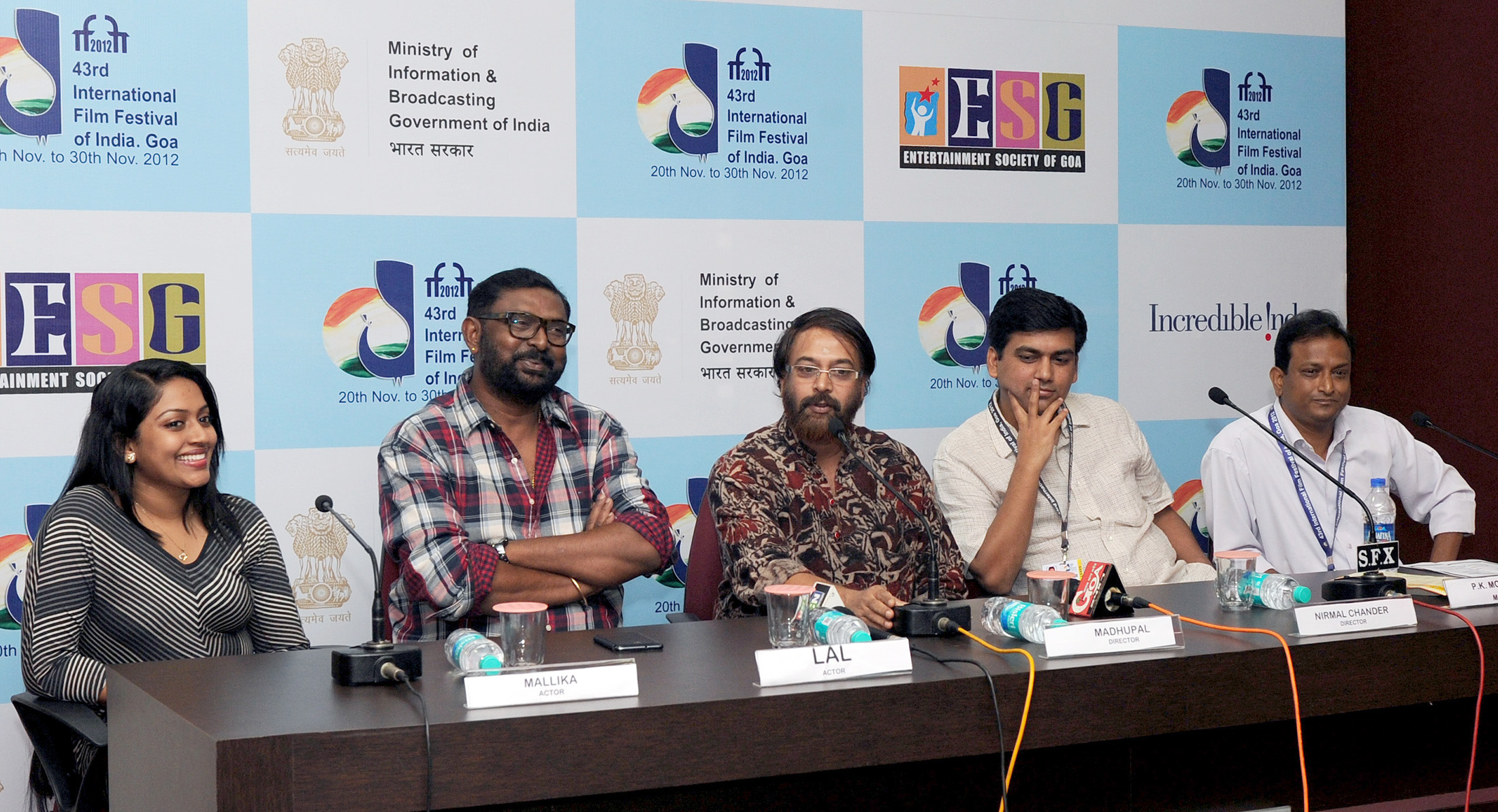
- Mallika, IFFI (2012)
- Born: Reeja Johnson; Thrissur, Kerala, India
- Occupation: Actress
- Years active: 2002–2013

Reeja Johnson, better known by her stage name Mallika, is a former Indian actress, who has mainly appeared in Malayalam and Tamil films.

== Career ==
After debuting in the Malayalam film Nizhalkuthu (2002), she played a significant role in Cheran's Autograph, following which she played supporting roles in several Tamil films. She later went on to play in a tele-serial called Anjali. She won the Filmfare Award for Best Supporting Actress for her role in Autograph. In 2012, she won a Special Mention from the Jury at the 59th National Film Awards for her performance in the film, Byari, the first feature film made in Beary language.

== Personal life ==
Mallika was born as Reeja Johnson to Johnson and Reetha, into a Syro-Malabar Syrian Christian family of Ollur in Thrissur, Kerala.

== Awards ==
- 2004 : Filmfare Award for Best Supporting Actress -Autograph
- 2012 : National Film Awards Special Mention from the Jury – Byari
- 2013 : Kerala Film Critics Association Awards – Second Best Actress – Various Movies

== Filmography ==
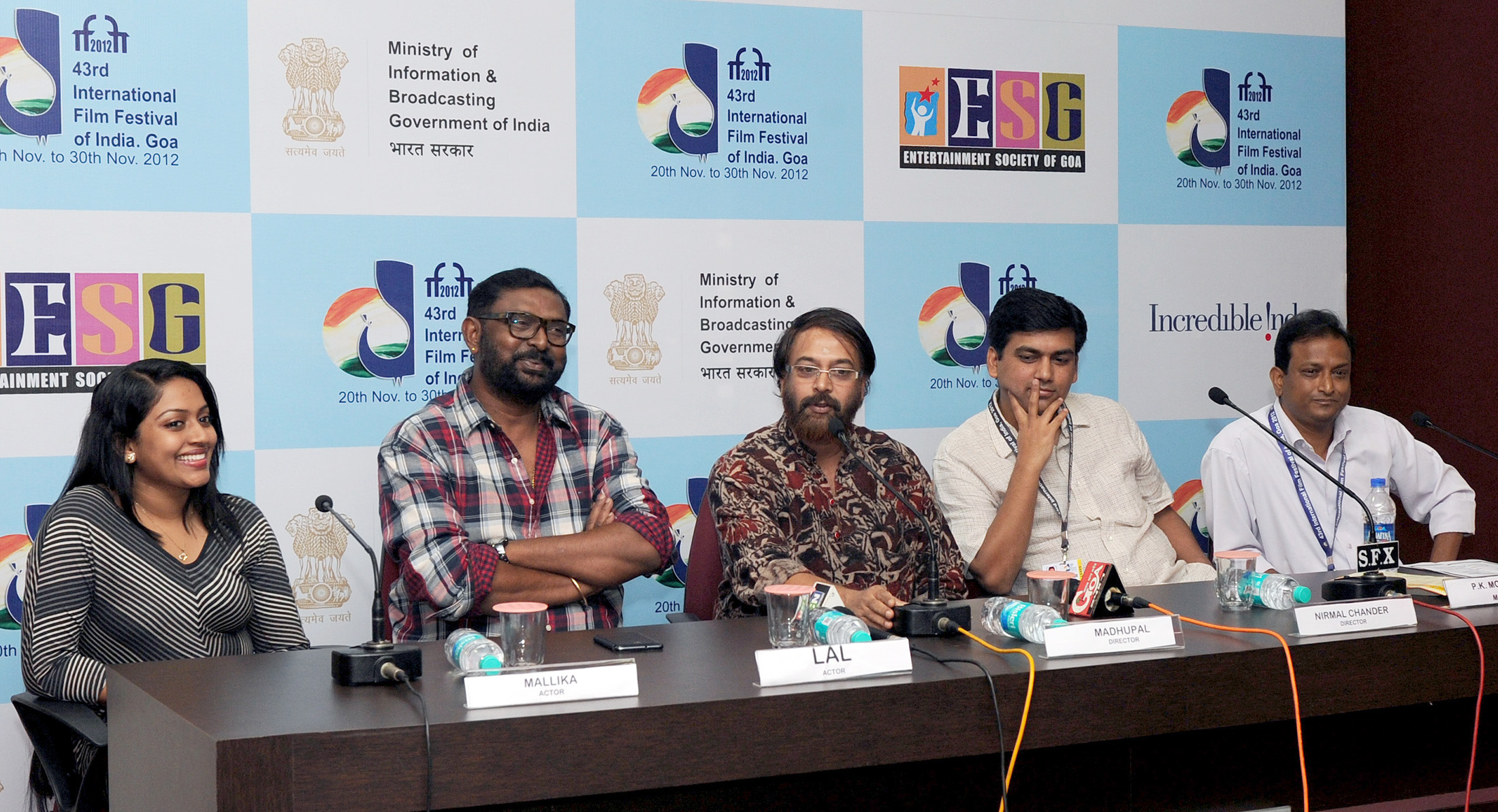
Press conference by the Director, Madhupal, Actress Mallika Film "Ozhimuri" and Nirmal Chander, Director of the Film "Dreaming Taj Mahal", at the 43rd International Film Festival of India (IFFI-2012), in Panaji, Goa

Year	Film	Role	Language	Notes
2002	Nizhalkuthu	Mallika	Malayalam	
2004	Autograph	Kamala	Tamil	Filmfare Award for Best Supporting Actress – Tamil
2004	Mahanadigan	Devaki	Tamil	
2004	Naa Autograph	Vimala	Telugu	
2004	Nerkku Nere	Janu	Malayalam	
2005	Thirupaachi	Karpagam	Tamil	Nominated – Filmfare Award for Best Supporting Actress – Tamil
2005	Kundakka Mandakka	Kavitha	Tamil	
2006	Thirupathi	Nurse Vasanthi	Tamil	
2006	Unakkum Enakkum	Valli	Tamil	
2006	Odahuttidavalu	Puttalakshmi	Kannada	
2008	Thotta	Gauri	Tamil	
2010	Ammanilavu	Neeraja	Malayalam	
2011	Priyappetta Nattukare	Ambily	Malayalam	
2011	Koratty Pattanam Railway Gate	Annie	Malayalam	
2011	Snehaveedu	Shanthi	Malayalam	
2011	Indian Rupee	Sajitha	Malayalam	
2011	Byari	Nadira	Beary	National Film Award – Special Mention
2012	No. 66 Madhura Bus	Bhavayami	Malayalam	
2012	Mr. Marumakan	Rohini	Malayalam	
2012	Ozhimuri	Meeenakshi Pillai	Malayalam	Nominated – SIIMA Award for Best Actress in a Supporting Role
2012	Puthiya Theerangal	Pushppa	Malayalam	
2013	Chennaiyil Oru Naal	Satyamoorthi's wife	Tamil	
2013	Ginger	Devika	Malayalam	
2013	Kathaveedu	Jameela	Malayalam	Kerala Film Critics Association Awards for Second Best Actress

== Television ==
Year	Title	Role	Channel	Language
2006–2008	Anjali	Anjali	Sun TV	Tamil
2008	Thiruvizhaiyadal	Gunavathy	Sun TV	Tamil
