= Autograph (2004 film) =

- Poster
- Directed by: Cheran
- Written by: Cheran
- Produced by: Cheran
- Starring: Cheran; Sneha; Kaniha; Gopika; Mallika
- Cinematography: Ravi Varman; Vijay Milton; Dwarakanath; Shanky Mahendran
- Edited by: S. Sathesh; J. N. Harsha
- Music by: Original songs: Bharadwaj; Background score: Sabesh–Murali
- Production company: Dream Theatres
- Release date: 19 February 2004
- Running time: 168 minutes
- Country: India
- Language: Tamil

Autograph is a 2004 Indian Tamil-language romantic drama film written, produced and directed by Cheran. The film's soundtrack is composed by Bharadwaj. Cheran also plays the lead role in his film for the first time, and other cast members include Sneha, Kaniha, Gopika, and Mallika.

This is both Gopika's and Mallika's debut film in Tamil cinema. The film was released in India on 19 February 2004, and was screened at the Lyon Asian Film Festival in France and at the Montreal World Film Festival in Canada. Upon release, the film met with critical acclaim and commercial success. It was remade in Telugu as Naa Autograph, Kannada as My Autograph, and in Bengali as Amar Aponjon and in Marathi with the same title (2023). The movie itself loosely based on Four Weddings and a Funeral.

== Plot ==
The film begins with Senthil Kumar, who runs an advertising agency, boarding a train on a journey to invite his friends and family for his forthcoming wedding. Along the way, he encounters various individuals from his past, who bring back memories of three women that have influenced his love life. During the journey, he reminisces his teenage days. The happenings in the school, his tussle with his friends and his first love with his classmate Kamala are all pictured with fun and drama. However, her father married her off early before her 11th grade. He meets Kamala 14 years later, and she is now a mother of three children, and a wife of a farmer. Senthil reaches the village and invites all including Kamala, who promises to come to the wedding.

Then, he goes to Kerala, where he had his college education. His major crush at that time was Lathika, a girl from Chalakudy, with whom he falls in love, but later, the affair proves to be short-lived as her parents marry her off to her cousin Madhavan after knowing about her love affair with Senthil. On reaching Chalakudy to invite her, Senthil is slightly disturbed to see her as a widow living with her grandmother for the past 12 years. He attempts to rekindle his love for her, but she corrects him.

On his journey, he comes across his trusted friend Divya, who instills confidence and elucidates him to the life lesson – that one has to go ahead in life without looking back. While she and Senthil travel on a bus, she reveals her tragic experience, that her mother is a paralytic patient and that she is the breadwinner of the family. As time passes by, she reveals that she was in love with someone and believed that he was the man of her life, but she was unfortunately let down. A poetic narration on the need for a good companion like Senthil who gives attention to her is stressed, even if it is not possible at his stage. In the end, Senthil marries the girl of his parents choice, Thenmozhi. All the three girls who were a part in his life, along with his school and college friends attend his wedding.

== Cast ==
- Cheran as Senthil Kumar
  - Sivaprakasam as young Senthil Kumar
- Sneha as Divya
- Kanika as Thenmozhi
- Gopika as Lathika
- Mallika as Kamala
- Ilavarasu as Narayanan teacher
  - Karuppiah Bharathi as Narayanan teacher, old age
- Krishna as Kamalakannan
- Benjamin as Oolamookkan Subramani
  - Lingeswaran as Oolamookkan Subramani, young age
- Rajesh as Pandian, Senthil's father
- Vijaya Singh as Kamala, Senthil's mother
- Pandian Raj as Mr. Rev. Albert Subramaniam, CEO of a US automobile company
- Ganesh Babu as Senthil's friend and a police inspector
- Ramesh Mali as Senthil's manager

== Production ==
Produced by Roja Combines, Cheran first cast Prabhu Deva in the lead role during October 2000, but the actor and producers later left the project. Cheran himself took over production under the banner Dream Theatres. Vikram was signed on as the new lead actor, but left as, according to Cheran, he did not want to do a romantic film after the success of his action film Gemini (2002). Vijay also showed interest after Cheran narrated the script, but the actor ultimately was unable to commit due to scheduling conflicts. Arvind Swamy revealed that he was also offered the main role, but he declined because he had retired from cinema in that time period. Cheran himself ultimately portrayed the role. He said the film was partly autobiographical. Four cinematographers worked on the film; Ravi Varman had shot the school episode in Senthil's early life with a 35 mm lens for which he used light angle, S. D. Vijay Milton shot the Kerala scenes, Dwaraknath shot the Chennai episode with a steady cam, and Shanky Mahendran shot the "'live' part" of the film when the camera uses the point of view of Senthil's character. Some of the scenes were shot at Alapuzha, Kerala.

== Music ==
The soundtrack was composed by Bharadwaj. The background was scored by the duo Sabesh–Murali. The song "Ovvoru Pookalume" also featured the performance of the members of Raaga Priya orchestra which also included its founder Comagan.

Track listing
No.	Title	Lyrics	Singer(s)	Length
1.	"Gyabagam Varuthe"	Cheran	Bharadwaj	5:02
2.	"Ninaivugal Nenjil"	Cheran	Unni Menon	4:38
3.	"Kizhakke Paarthen"	Snehan	Yugendran, Poni	4:32
4.	"Jagatho Tharana"	Purandara Dasar Keerthanai	Reshmi, Srividya	2:47
5.	"Ovvoru Pookalume"	Pa. Vijay	K. S. Chithra	5:25
6.	"Manasukkulle Dhagam"	Snehan	Reshmi, Harish Raghavendra	5:22
7.	"Maname Nalama"	Snehan	Bharadwaj	0:54
8.	"Meesa Vecha Perandi"	Pa. Vijay	Kovai Kamala, Karthik, Chorus	4:28
Total length:				33:08

== Release ==
Autograph faced delays in its release for over 8 months. It was eventually scheduled to release on 14 February 2004, during Valentine's Day, but was postponed to 19 February due to distribution issues.

=== Critical reception ===
Sify wrote, "A major plus point of Autograph is that Cheran has chosen three cameramen to do the three episodes in his life which makes the film lively and nostalgic." Dennis Harvey of Variety wrote, "Well-mounted production has too much familiar melodrama, and few real highlights (notably one delightful homage to '70s Tamil musicals), but remains an easy watch." Visual Dasan of Kalki wrote that Cheran's creative maturity, re-emerging not only as an actor but also as a fine artist, was recorded as an art form in Autograph. Malini Mannath of Chennai Online wrote "'Autograph' is nostalgia, tackled with sensitivity and sensibility. Yet another feather in Cheran's cap!". G. Ulaganathan of Deccan Herald wrote, "In Autograph, Cheran plays the lead role. Technique wise it is a novel attempt. Cheran tries to recreate the nostalgic moments in a young man's life which live in his memories for ever. As a director, he has not only succeeded in that part but also brought some good cinematic moments on the screen".

=== Accolades ===
Event	Category	Recipient(s)	Ref.
52nd National Film Awards	Best Popular Film Providing Wholesome Entertainment	Autograph	
52nd National Film Awards	Best Female Playback Singer	K. S. Chithra	
52nd National Film Awards	Best Lyrics	Pa. Vijay	
52nd Filmfare Awards South	Best Film – Tamil	Autograph	
52nd Filmfare Awards South	Best Director – Tamil	Cheran	
52nd Filmfare Awards South	Best Supporting Actress – Tamil	Mallika	
52nd Filmfare Awards South	Best Music Director – Tamil	Bharadwaj	
Tamil Nadu State Film Awards	Best Film	Autograph	
Tamil Nadu State Film Awards	Best Director	Cheran	
Tamil Nadu State Film Awards	Best Female Playback Singer	K. S. Chithra	

== Remakes and sequels ==
The film was remade in Telugu as Naa Autograph (2004), in Kannada as My Autograph (2006), in Bengali as Amar Aponjon (2017), and in Marathi with the same title (2023). A sequel was announced by Cheran, but did not materialise.

== Bibliography ==
- Dhananjayan, G. (2014). Pride of Tamil Cinema: 1931–2013. Blue Ocean Publishers. OCLC 898765509.
