= Koratty Pattanam Railway Gate =

- Theatrical release poster
- Directed by: Hafiz M Ismail
- Written by: Nelson Thomas
- Screenplay by: Nelson Thomas
- Story by: Nelson Thomas
- Produced by: A Marikar; Hafiz M Ismail
- Starring: Ajay Natraj Shafiqu Rahiman Mallika
- Edited by: Hemanth Harshan
- Music by: Gayoz Johnson
- Distributed by: A Marikar Release
- Release date: 23 September 2011
- Country: India
- Language: Malayalam

Koratty Pattanam Railway Gate is a 2011 Malayalam film directed by debutant Hafiz Ismail, starring mainly newcomers. The lead roles are by Ajay Natesh and Mallika.

== Plot ==
It is based on a Koratty colony where two gangs are in an open fight that often emerges from a long-standing cut throat rivalry between the two.

== Cast ==
- Ajay Nataraj
- Shafiqu Rahiman
- Mallika
- Premnath
- Rajeev Rajan
- Miraj Bhasker
- Shammi Thilakan
- T. S. Raju
- Kalasala Babu
- Narayanankutty
- Bineesh Kodiyeri
- Nelson
- Sajeer
- Seema G. Nair
- Zeenath
- Shalini
- Krishna
- Sonia
- Master Sreekailas
- Master Aashik
