= Aethirree =

- Poster
- Directed by: K. S. Ravikumar
- Screenplay by: K. S. Ravikumar
- Story by: Kamalesh Kumar
- Produced by: G. V. Prasad
- Starring: Madhavan; Sadha; Rahman; Kanika; Vivek; FEFSI Vijayan
- Cinematography: Ashok Rajan
- Edited by: K. Thanigachalam
- Music by: Yuvan Shankar Raja
- Production company: Damini Enterprises
- Distributed by: Mars Entertainmaent Group
- Release date: 23 April 2004
- Country: India
- Language: Tamil

Aethirree (alternatively spelt Ethiri; (Note: Spelt as Ethiri on the CBFC certificate.) transl. Enemy) is a 2004 Indian Tamil-language action comedy film directed by K. S. Ravikumar. The film starred Madhavan, Sadha, Vivek, Kanika, Rahman, Delhi Ganesh and FEFSI Vijayan in pivotal roles, and had a musical score composed by Yuvan Shankar Raja. It was released on 23 April 2004. In 2007, the film went on to be remade in Telugu as State Rowdy.

== Plot ==
Subramani aka Mani lives with his older sister and brother-in-law, who adopted him after his biological parents died. They are caring and loving to him, while having a daughter, who is like a sister to Mani. Mani's brother-in-law wants to get their daughter married to Mani. But Mani learns that she is in love with another guy, who is jobless like him and cancels the wedding plans paving way for his cousin's wedding with her lover. This angers Mani's brother-in-law and he forces him out of his home.

Natarajan Iyer is a naive Brahmin Tamilian house owner in Triplicane, Chennai, Tamil Nadu who lives with his daughter Gayatri Iyer, who is a college student near the Parthasarathy Temple. He is looking for the right tenant for the upper portion of his house. Since, he often fears that the prospective tenant might romance Gayathri, he filters all the people who come asking for the house. He rents out the house to five bachelor students, who pretend to be good. Natarajan wants to get rid of the students, who used to stay at a hostel, but were expelled due to bad behaviour. They had heard about Natarajan, his house, which includes a spare room apartment, which hasn't been used for about years and his conditions on living there including his fears and his filtering. They pretended to be good college students and were allowed to live in the house by Natarajan. Unfortunately, they end up showing their true nature to Natarajan and Gayatri, while causing Natarajan to have so much trouble. Natarajan tried to get them out of here, but was threatened by them along with Gayatri. He soon gets the help of "Auto" Sampath, an auto driver and friend of Mani. Auto Sampath suggest to Natarajan about hiring a rowdy to take care of the tenants, instead of hiring a lawyer, as by doing that, not only will the tenants get out of there, but also he and Gayatri. Natarajan accepted Auto Sampath's suggestion and Auto Sampath took him to see Mani at a prison.

Auto Sampath lied to Natarajan that Mani was in the prison because he killed a house owner, but really, Mani was actually visiting his brother-in-law in there to give him his lunch, as his brother-in-law is the jailer in the prison and has his lunch delivered by Mani every day. Mani was reluctant into acting and pretending to be a rowdy, but Auto Sampath convinced him otherwise, as Mani has to pay back a bank loan of interest. Mani receives money from Natarajan as payment and in turn, he gave to his cousin asking her to give it to her lover, so that he can get a job and that she can finally talk about him to her father. Auto Sampath introduces Mani to Natarajan as a gangster/rowdy named 'Bottle' Mani, in which coincidentally, there is an actual gangster/rowdy named 'Bottle' Mani. Mani comes to Natarajan's house and everyone in Mylapore is scared in believing Mani to be 'Bottle' Mani. Even the students were scared of Mani, but later warmed up to Mani and Auto Sampath and became fast friends with them. Mani and Auto Sampath started staying with them. Mani also became best friends with Gayatri and had helped save her from a gang of goons at a marketplace, who confused him to be 'Bottle' Mani and have harassed Gayatri. Gayatri kept on talking about Mani to Natarajan a lot later that day, causing him to think that Mani and Gayatri are in love with each other. Mani warns the students to get vacate the house immediately. The students accepted to vacate the home within a week. One of the students requests Mani to help him unite with his lover, when he attempted suicide, upon hearing that her family are doing an arranged marriage for her, but was mainly saved by his friends, Auto Sampath and Mani, who witnessed him doing his suicide attempt.

Mani and Auto Sampath kidnap Priya on the day of her marriage from the wedding hall thinking her to be the lover of the non-bachelor student. But in reality, they ended up in another wedding hall. They tried waking up Priya, but were unable and were forced to have her admitted in a hospital. Priya wakes up and upon realising what happened, attempted suicide, but was saved by Mani. Mani and Auto Sampath take Priya along with them to Natarajan's home, where Mani, Auto Sampath, and the students including the married student's wife questioned her and revealed to her, who her saviour was: Mani. Priya attempted suicide again, as her wedding is already cancelled due to the mishap, but was stopped by Mani. Mani apologises to Priya and requests to drop her back to her home, while having been to introduced to Natarajan and Gayatri as the sister of one of the students. Slowly, Priya gets attracted towards Mani seeing his kind nature and also after coming to know about the sacrifice made by him for the well-being of his cousin, while also of his help to get an acceptance from the family of the married student's wife of their marriage. Mani was then later confronted by the doctor that checked on Priya and he revealed to him that Priya was poisoned, when she was kidnapped by Mani and Auto Sampath at her wedding and at the time, she was admitted at the hospital.

Confronted by Mani, Priya reveals a flashback where she is the only daughter of a rich politician. Her father wants Priya to marry Assistant Commissioner of Police Raghavan, a corrupt cop and an affluent sadist, who was once married, but had killed his own wife in a sadistic manner. Although, Priya is not interested in the proposal having learned Raghavan's true nature from the priest, who is conducting her wedding and had conducted Raghavan's first wedding, her father wanted her to agree, just because Raghavan helped him escape from a police case. Priya decides to commit suicide on the day of her wedding with Raghavan, but luckily gets kidnapped and saved by Mani, whom she first met at a shopping mall mistaking him to be Raghavan, which is coincidentally the very day she and Raghavan first met. It was also the very day Mani and Raghavan first met each other in a scuffle Raghavan had with Mani over his engagement ring for Priya, that Mani accidentally got it pretty dirty, only for him to clean it up. Priya also met Mani again at his fight in the marketplace.

Meanwhile, Raghavan sets charge to find Priya and marry her. Priya's father found out where his daughter is and attempted to take her back with him, but eventually ended up having a fight with Mani and was defeated by him. Raghavan arrives there, holds Mani at gunpoint and arrests him under a false case of him being 'Bottle' Mani, while getting his colleagues to beat him up, as Priya was taken back home by her father. Mani escaped with the help of Auto Sampath, the tenants, and a sympathetic police officer, Inspector Dhanapathi, who is one of Raghavan's colleagues, when he was set to killed in an encounter by Raghavan. This causes Raghavan to kill Dhanapathi and one of the students, while covering up the murders and getting another of his colleagues, a police constable to be an eyewitness of this by pinning it all on Mani. Mani, on hearing of this, tries to get revenge by confronting and beating up all of Raghavan's colleagues including the constable, in which this in turn cause Raghavan to put and arrest Mani's brother-in-law, Natarajan, three of the students, and Auto Sampath behind bars.

Mani confronts Raghavan and a fight happens between them. Priya's father intervened and tried to help Raghavan to defeat Mani, but ended up being defeated by Mani and accidentally killed by Raghavan by throwing a knife mistargeted at him, which is originally meant for Mani. Raghavan attempted to use Priya as a hostage, only for him to be shot and killed by Mani, who was armed with Raghavan's gun, having managed to swipe it during the fight. Mani covers both murders by getting Priya to be an eyewitness to this crime, while also getting himself to be innocent by having the constable to reveal the entire truth to the press. Finally, in the end, Priya reunites with Mani. They along with Auto Sampath and the rest of the tenants depart the house, gave their farewells to Natarajan and Gayatri, and went on their own separate ways. The film ends with a group of bachelors wanting to be the new tenants of the house by being just like the students pretended to be: good boys. Natarajan accepted them, and while he and most of the tenants were gone, one of them made advances toward Gayatri, only for Gayatri to scold him. As she left, the tenant (K.S. Ravikumar) then said the very punchline of Auto Sampath to the audience, who commonly tells that to Natarajan throughout the entire and whole film: " Just kidding, just kidding."

== Cast ==
- Madhavan as Subramani aka Mani ('Bottle' Mani)
- Sadha as Priya
- Rahman as Asst. Commissioner of Police (ACP), Raghavan IPS
- Kanika as Gayathri Iyer (Gayu Maami)
- Vivek as 'Auto' Sampath
- Delhi Ganesh as Nataraja Iyer
- FEFSI Vijayan as Sundarpandian, Priya's father
- R. Sundarrajan as Subramani's uncle
- Manobala as Seshagopalan
- Vasu Vikram as the married student's brother-in-law
- Madhan Bob as a bike store owner
- Bosskey as a doctor
- Kanal Kannan as a police constable
- Thennavan as Inspector Dhanapathi
- Crane Manohar as a security guard
- Meera Krishnan as Priya's mother
- K. S. Ravikumar in a special appearance as one of the new tenants.

== Production ==
In late 2003, Damini Enterprises brought director K. S. Ravikumar and actor Madhavan together for a project titled Ethiri. Sadha and Vivek were added to the cast, while Yuvan Shankar Raja was announced as the film's music composer. Nikita Thukral initially began portraying the role of the second female lead actress in the film, but was replaced by Kanika midst production. Actor Rahman made a comeback to Tamil films and appeared as an antagonist for the first time through the venture. The film was launched on 28 November 2003 at Prasad Studios with several actors and directors from the Tamil film industry attending the event. A song was shot at AVM Studios and Prasad studios with three sets built by art director G. K. Some crucial scenes were shot at Triplicane, Chennai while a fight scene was shot in studios with a set resembling a market.

== Soundtrack ==
The music was scored by Yuvan Shankar Raja.

Song	Singer(s)	Duration	Lyricist
"Podu Nanba Sakkai Podu"	Karthik	4:00	Na. Muthukumar
"Thamizhnaatu Pennai"	Tippu, Shalini Singh	4:03	Kabilan
"Saithane Saithane"	Shankar Mahadevan, Srilekha Parthasarathy	4:55	Pa. Vijay
"Bottle Mani Rap"	Premji Amaran, Naveen, Chorus	2:09	Premji Amaran & Swathi
"Mudhal Mudhalaga"	Hariharan	5:14	Victor Doss
"Ichu Thaariyaa"	Shankar Mahadevan, Srivarthini	4:41	Pa. Vijay
"Kadhal Vandhu"	Ranjith, Sujatha	3:40	Kalidasan

== Reception ==
A reviewer from Sify stated that the film was an "entertainer" and "on the whole Ravikumar has churned out a hilarious film for the entire family", adding "he has successfully mixed comedy and action as the film moves at a fast pace". Visual Dasan of Kalki called it old wine in new bottle. Malini Mannath of Chennai Online wrote "The director has tried to make the whole experience a hilarious one. But, unfortunately for him, it falls flat, the laughs few and far between". Cinesouth wrote "This is a typical commercial film and the director has succeeded to a great extent". K. N. Vijiyan of New Straits Times wrote "What saves the movie is Madhavan's acting and Vivek's outrageous comedy. In fact, without Vivek, Ethiree would have been just average movie". G. Ulaganathan of Deccan Herald wrote "Ravikumar has successfully mixed comedy and action as the film moves at a fast pace".
