= Hariharan discography =

Discography of Indian singer Hariharan

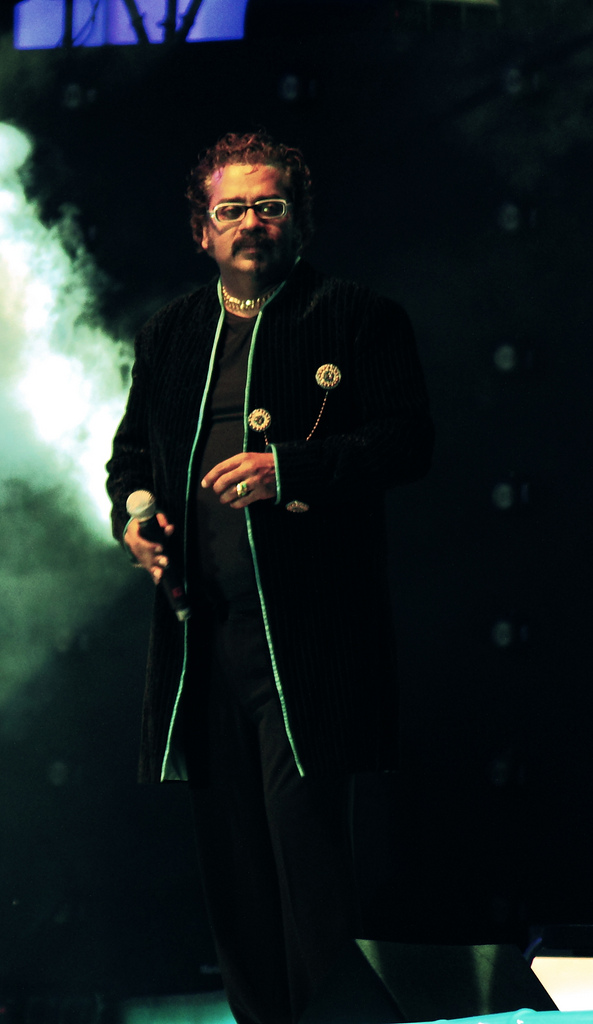
- Hariharan at A. R. Rahman Concert in Sydney, 2010
- Studio albums: 27
- Soundtrack albums: 1
- Live albums: 3
- Compilation albums: 5

This article includes the discography of Indian singer and composer Hariharan. Listed are all the albums and the notable film songs sung by him in order of their release. The discography consists of 27 studio albums, three live albums, five compilations, one film soundtrack and several film songs sung by him. Out of the 27 studio albums, 24 are solo albums and three are albums by the band Colonial Cousins, consisting Hariharan and Lesle Lewis.

Started his career in 1977, Hariharan established himself as a leading playback singer, and a ghazal singer and composer. In 1998, he with Lesle Lewis formed a band named Colonial Cousins. Within a span of few years, they became the pioneers of Indian pop music. They have 3 albums and a film soundtrack to their credit. They are indicated by "♦" in this discography.

Since the labels Magnasound and Bay Shore are now closed down and have not yet sold the rights of distribution, many of his albums are not available in stores and is declared unavailable in major music sales websites.

== Studio albums ==
Year	Title	Album details	Track listing
N A	Shamakhana	Digital Release Date: 1981: Label: N A; Genre: N A	N A
N A	Ghazal Ka Mausam	Digital Release Date: N A: Label: Music India; Genre: Ghazal	1. Hasti Apni Habaab Kisi Hai; 2. Khud Ko Behtar Hai; 3. Zabt-e-Gham Ka Sila; 4. Dayam Pada Hua; 5. Patthar Sulag Rahe The; 6. Nishaan Yun To
1983	Horizon	Digital Release Date: N A: Label: Pan Classics; Genre: N A	1. Awara; 2. Hamne Kaati; 3. Saqiya Jayen Kahan Hum; 4. la De Sharaab Saaki; 5. Phool Ke Aaspaas; 6. Sharab La Sharab De; 7. Ban Nahin Paya Jo Mera; 8. Sakiya Jaye Kahan; 9. Kya Khabar Thi
1983	Sukoon	Digital Release Date: N A: Label: Pan Classics; Genre: N A	1. Husn Ko Chand Jawani Ko (6:03); 2. Jab Se Woh Mahpara Gaya (4:37); 3. Peheli Baar Mile The Jaise; 4. Haath Mein Leke Mere Haath; 5. Roya Karenge Aap Bhi (4:21); 6. Ghar Chod Ke Bhi Zindagi (6:10)
1985	Aabshar-e-Ghazal	Digital Release Date: 1985: Label: N A; Genre: World Music; Re-released as Kuch Door Hamare Saath	1. Yahi Wafa Ka Sila Hai To (5:49); 2. Jab Raat Ki Tanhayee (6:34); 3. Kuch Door Hamare Saath (6:07); 4. Log Kehte Hain (6:28); 5. Sochte Sochte (5:13); 6. Kahin Tar Kahin Shabnam (5:16); 7. Pehle Bhi Jeete The (6:55); 8. Yun Na Thi (5:59)
1987	Reflections	Digital Release Date: 1987: Label : T-Series; Genre: World Music	1. Husn Walon Ka Khuda; 2. Tumhare Naam Se; 3. Muh Dekhne Walon Ke Liye; 4. Kab Tak Yun Hi; 5. Jaaye To Kahan Jaye; 6. Yunhi Besabab; 7. Bhar Ke Paimana; 8. Ab Koi Khwab
1988	Dil Nasheen	Digital Release Date: 1988: Label: T-Series; Genre: World Music; Re-release of Horizon	1. Aaj Bhi Hain Mere Kadman Ke (6:03); 2. Tujhe Kasa Hai Saqiya Sharab (5:59); 3. Saqiya Jayen Kahan Hum (5:46); 4. Phool Ke Aas Paas Rahte Hain (5:04); 5. Sagar Hai Mera Khali La De (5:19); 6. Kya Khabar Thi Ke Main Is (6:12); 7. Ban Nahin Paya Jo Mera (6:54); 8. Humne Kati Hain Teri Yaado (6:18); 9. Pahali Baar Mile The (5:28)
1989	Dil Ki Baat	Digital Release Date: 1989: Label: Bay Shore; Genre: World Music	1. Ruth Haseen Hain (5:05); 2. Ye Sochkar Us Se Milna (5:40); 3. Raat Bhar Tanha Raha (6:02); 4. Badan Mein Aag (6:48); 5. Ahista Chal (4:32); 6. Hum Ko Patthar Ko (6:51); 7. Bhige Hue Lamhe (6:19); 8. Ye Waqt Dil Pe Kada Hai (5:57)
1992	Hazir	Digital Release Date: 20 February 1992: Label: Omi Music; Genre: World Music	1. Jiya Jiya Na Jiya (7:26); 2. Jo Bhi Dukh.mp3 (4:45); 3. Zindagi Jaam Se (6:58); 4. Koi Saaya Zimilaya (6:47); 5. Phool Hai Chand Hai (5:22); 6. Shahar Dar Shahar (5:13); 7. Agar Yakin Nahi Aata (5:10); 8. Dard Ke Rishte (9:19)
1994	Gulfam	Digital Release Date: 1994: Label: Venus; Genre: World Music	1. Mujhe Phir Wahi" (5:23); 2. Koi Patta Hile" (5:00); 3. Ahede Wafa Aahista" (5:59); 4. Daro Deewar Pe" (6:42); 5. Who Pilaye To Zara" (6:02); 6. Aa Chandani Bhi" (6:13); 7. Aks Chehre Pe" (6:36); 8. Kabhi Khushi Se" (9:16)
1996	Intoxicating Hariharan	Digital Release Date: 23 April 1996: Label: Omi Music; Genre: World Music	1. Sakiya Jaye Kahan (6:30); 2. Ahde Masti Hai (7:06); 3. Halka Sa Ik Nasha (5:11); 4. Sharab La Sharab De (7:23); 5. Haton Mein Apne Jaam Nahin To (6:03); 6. Zindagi Jaam Se (6:54)
1996	Qaraar	Digital Release Date: 5 March 1996: Label: T-Series; Genre: World Music	1. Haalat Meri Ab Ye Ho Gai Hai (5:28); 2. Baante Hain Jisne Saare Jugnu Diye Sitare (6:27); 3. Ghame Zaat Se Maavara Kar Gaye (5:06); 4. Nazar Shanas Tha Kya Kaam Kar Gaya (6:42); 5. Zindane Suboh Shaam Mein Tu Bhi Hai (6:38); 6. Wafa Ki Raah Mein Ye to Zaroor Hona Tha (6:25); 7. Jitne Bhi Gham the Dil Ki Navaon Mein Aa Gaye (6:57); 8. Safar Aur Mausam Badalte Hue (5:28)
1996	Visaal – Ghazals for Connoisseurs	Digital Release Date: 1996: Label: Navras Records; Genre: World Music	1. Apne aaine men utaar mujhe – Mumtaz Rashid (11:27); 2. Daaim para hua tere dar pe nahin hun main – Ghalib (11:06); 3. Hava ka zor hi kafi bahaana hota hai – Shehryar (9:54); 4. Kyun hamen maut ke paigham diye jaate hain – Shamim Jaipuri (11:33); 5. Asar us par zara nahin hota – Momin (13:37)
1996	Jashn	Digital Release Date:1996: Label: Venus; Genre: World Music	1. Unse Jab Jab Bhi (6:00); 2. Sab Kuch Sun Na (6:21); 3. Aap Hamare Saath Nahi (5:49); 4. Khud Ko Padhta Hoon (5:21); 5. Koi Mausam Ho (6:04); 6. Muddaton Baad Surat (6:38); 7. Jane Kaisi Pasand (5:25); 8. Raat Khamosh Thi (6:16)
1996	Halka Nasha	Digital Release Date:1996: Label: Bay Shore; Genre: World Music	1. Tera Naya Naam" (5:22); 2. Halka Sa Ek Nasha (5:10); 3. Aankhon Se Baatein Kare (6:02); 4. Duniya Parayi Hui (4:22); 5. Kaise Jiyoon Main (3:47); 6. Jawaan Mausam (5:06); 7. Duniya Bahar Ki (7:07); 8. Hum Tera Intezaar (5:54)
1996	Colonial Cousins ♦	Digital Release Date: 1 October 1996: Label: Magnasound; Genre: World Music	1. It's Gonna Be Alright (6:53); 2. Indian Rain (6:33); 3. Feel Alright (5:59); 4. Krishna (5:50); 5. Let Me See The Love (4:23); 6. Sa Ni Dha Pa (5:05); 7. Forever Yours Forever Mine (5:59); 8. Adrian's Angel (4:42); 9. Teri Meri Aankhon Mein (6:02)
1997	Paigham	Digital Release Date: 1 January 1997: Label: Venus; Genre: World Music	1. Jab Who Mere Kareeb (6:41); 2. Lafzon Ki Taraha (6:05); 3. Yeh Tajruba (5:55); 4. Daag Duniya Ne (6:18); 5. Aayi Idhar Baharein (6:27); 6. Tadap Uthoon Bhi To (6:25); 7. Do Roz Mein (5:56); 8. Saaqi Sharab La (6:06)
1998	Aathwan Sur – The Other Side of Naushad	Digital Release Date: 1998: Label: Navras Records; Genre: World Music	1. Mujh Ko Muaff Kijiye (5:34); 2. Ghata Chhaayi Thi Saawan Khul Ke Barsa (7:18); 3. Saawan Kay Jab Baadal Chhaaye (6:49); 4. Peenay Waalay Bekhudi Say Kaam Lay (8:13); 5. Tanhaa Khud Say Baat Karoon (7:49); 6. Aabadiyon Mein Dusht Ka Munzar Bhi Aayega (7:07); 7. Kabhi Meri Yaad Unko Aati To Hogi (6:07); 8. Aaj Ki Baat Kal Pay Kyun Taalo (6:17)
1998	The Way We Do It ♦	Digital Release Date: 1998: Label: Sony BMG; Genre: World Music	1. The Way We Do It (3:59); 2. Feels So Good (4:58); 3. Stay Back Tonight (4:19); 4. Funky Freedom (6:01); 5. Jaar Ja (3:31); 6. Lady (6:04); 7. Virtual Reality (4:28); 8. Visions (5:15); 9. Dekhoon Mai Jahan (4:36); 10. Rhythm of The World (4:26); 11. No Longer Mine (6:25); 12. Speak Up (4:36)
2000	Kaash	Digital Release Date: 4 April 2000: Label: Bay Shore; Genre: World Music	1. Kaash (6:24); 2. Yeh Aaine Se (6:39); 3. Jhoom Le (6:34); 4. Hum Ne Ek Shaam (6:28); 5. Maikade (5:58); 6. Aadhi Raat (6:00); 7. Aandhiyan (7:15); 8. Ab Ke Baras (6:56)
2001	Aatma ♦	Digital Release Date: 1 January 2001: Label: Sony BMG; Genre: World Music	1. Guiding Star (5:35); 2. Mata Pita (3:20); 3. Dheem Dheem Dhirena (3:40); 4. Dil Mein Tu (6:33); 5. I Love You Girl (5:14); 6. Sri Rama (6:35); 7. Kai Zhala (4:25); 8. Turn Around Angle Eyes (6:05); 9. Sundar Balma (6:12)
2005	Lahore Ke Rang Hari Ke Sang	Digital Release Date: 26 September 2005: Genre: World Music	1. Mohay Upnay Hi Rang Mai Rang De (5:45); 2. Bhavain Tu Jaan Na Jaan (5:48); 3. Dil Se Hur Guzri Baat (5:04); 4. Rooth Gaye Moray Baankay (5:36); 5. Bohut Kathin Hai Dagar Punghut Ki (6:08); 6. Mur Ke Hum Khak-e-Raahay Yaar Huay (5:36); 7. Aa Vekh Asada Haal (6:07); 8. Piya Toray Aangun Mai (4:46); 9. Saanjh Dhalay Na (6:34); 10. Begana Vaar Unsay (6:15)
2006	Dil Aisa Kisi Ne Mera Toda	Digital Release Date: 21 November 2006: Label: Silverstreak; Genre: World Music	1. Tumhe Bhool Jaaoun (7:41); 2. Kho Gayee Hai (8:47); 3. Jab Shabnam Se (5:56); 4. Mayusi Ki Barf (7:16); 5. Raat Failegi To (5:17); 6. Dil Se Umdey Ankh Se (6:50); 7. Kabhi Chup Ke Se (6:34); 8. Mere Pyaar Ki (4:50)
2006	Tirupati Shri Balaji	Release date: 2006: Label: T-Series; Genre: Devotional	1. "Dekha Hai Ek Sapna"; 2. "Ganpati Sun Lo"
2007	Waqt Par Bolna	Digital Release Date: 6 August 2007: Label: Sony BMG; Genre: World Music	1. Waqt Par Bolna (3:56); 2. Dhoop Kitni Tej Ho (4:59); 3. Mujhko Chhuke Pighal Rahe Ho (4:38); 4. Jab Bhi Miltey Ho (5:02); 5. Mere Dil Ki Raakh (4:47); 6. Maine Teri Aankhon Mein (5:02); 7. Galat Hai Muskurana (5:54); 8. Kesaria Balamva (5:44); 9. Yun To Haste Huye (5:28); 10. Who Sarphiri Hawa (6:14)
2008	Lafzz...	Digital Release Date: 19 November 2008: Label: T-Series; Genre: World Music	1. Kya Toota Hai Andar; 2. Faisla Tumko Bhool Jane Ka; 3. Haalat Meri Abb Ye Ho Gaee Hai; 4. Wafa Ki Raah Mein Ye To Zaroor Hona Tha; 5. Humne Kaatti Hain Teri Yaadon Mein Raatein Aksar; 6. Bann Nahin Paya Jo Mera Humsafar Kehna Usey; 7. Zindane Suboh Shaam Mein Too Bhi Hai; 8. Saaqiya Jayein Kahan Hum Tere Maikhane Se; 9. Sagar Hai Mera Khaali, La De Sharab Saqi; 10. Pehli Baar Mile They; 11. Tujhe Kasam Hai Saqiya Sharab La Sharab De; 12. Ghar Chhod Ke
2013	Nandagopalam	Label: MC Audios and Videos; Genre: Devotional	1. Shree Krishna
N A	The Great Ghazals	Digital Release Date: N A: Label: Gramophone Company India; Genre: World Music	1. Mujhko Maaf Kijiye; 2. Ghataa Chayee To; 3. Sawaan Ke Badal Chaye; 4. Peene Wale Bekhudi Se; 5. Tanha Khud Se Baat; 6. Hasti Apni Habaab Kisi Hai; 7. Khud Ko Behtar Hai; 8. Patthar Sulag Rahe The
N A	Kuch Door Hamare Saath	Digital Release Date: N A: Label: BMG Crescendo; Genre: World Music; Re-release of Aabshar-e-Ghazal	1. Yahi Wafa Ka Sila Hai To (5:49); 2. Jab Raat Ki Tanhayee (6:34); 3. Kuch Door Hamare Saath (6:07); 4. Log Kehte Hain (6:28); 5. Sochte Sochte (5:13); 6. Kahin Tar Kahin Shabnam (5:16); 7. Pehle Bhi Jeete The (6:55); 8. Yun Na Thi (5:59)

== Live albums ==
Year	Title	Album details	Track listing
1990	Hariharan in Concert	Digital Release Date: 1990	1. Sakiya Jaye Kahan (6:29); 2. Ahde Masti Hai (7:05); 3. Beeti Bathein (7:18); 4. Kuch Door Hamare Saath (5:21); 5. Sharab La Sharab De (7:22); 6. Ek Bewafa (7:50); 7. Aaj Abhi Hai Mere Kadmon Ke Nishan Awara (8:07)
1996	Saptarishi	Digital Release Date: 1996: Label: Magnasound; Genre: World Music	1. Kadamon Ke Nishaan; 2. Usne Jab Mujhse Kiya Bewafa; 3. Mujhe Phir Wohi Yaad Aanay Lagi; 4. Koyee Sayaa Jhilmilaaya; 5. Daayam Padaa Huva; 6. Mareez Ishk Ka Kya Hai; 7. Mein Khayal Hoon Kisi Aur Ka
2001	Swar Utsav	Digital Release Date: 2001: Label: Music Today; Genre: World Music	1. Ranj Ki Guftagu; 2. Har Ek Rooh; 3. Log Kehte Hain; 4. Jahan Tak Yaadein; 5. Tumhare Khat Mein; 6. Patta Patta Boota Boota

== Compilations ==
Year	Title	Album details	Track listing
1989	The Very Best of Hariharan Ghazals	Digital Release Date: 1989	N A
1990	My Favourite Hits	Digital Release Date: 1990: Label: OMI Music; Genre: World Music	1. Ahde Masti Hai (5:55); 2. Main Khayal Hoon (6:09); 3. Kuch Door (5:18); 4. Ek Bewafaa (7:43); 5. Ye Sochkar Us Se Milna (5:35); 6. Beeti Batein (5:55); 7. Badan Mein Aag (6:42); 8. Sakiya Jaye Kahan (6:23); 9. Ye Waqt Dil Pe Kada Hai (5:54); 10. Bhige Hue Lamhe (6:13); 11. Sham Hai Pur Shabab (4:37); 12. Bahut Udas Faza Hai (4:49)
1999	Velvet Voice – Hariharan	Digital Release Date: 1999: Label: Venus; Genre: World Music	1. Muje Phir Wohi (5:20); 2. Unse Jab Jab Bhi (5:59); 3. Koi Patta Hile (5:02); 4. Aap Hamare Saath Nahin (6:24); 5. Saaqi Sharab La (6:08); 6. Jab Woh Mere Kareeb (6:42); 7. Kabhi Kushi Se (9:18); 8. Raat Khamoshi Thi (6:52)
N A	Hariharan - Down the Years	Digital Release Date: N A: Label: OMI Music; Genre: World Music	1. Ahdi Masti Hai; 2. Ahista Chal; 3. Bharath Humko Jaan Se Pyara Hai; 4. Jiya Jiya Na Jiya; 5. Kuch Door Hamare Saath; 6. Sharab la Sharab De; 7. Teri Meri Aankhon Mein
N A	Magic Moments	Digital Release Date: N A: Label: BMG Crescendo; Genre: World Music	1. Awara (6:26); 2. Hamne Kaati (6:23); 3. La De Sharaab Sakhi (5:25); 4. Pehle Bhi Jeete The (6:51); 5. Tum Gaye (4:54); 6. Sharaab La Sharaab De (6:04); 7. Moh Dekhne Valo (5:17); 8. Kuch Door Hamare Saath (6:03); 9. Haath Mein Leke Mera Haath (6:10); 10. Roya Karenge Aap Bhi (5:48)

== Duets ==
=== I ===
Year	Song name	Film/Album/Concert name	Music director(s)	Co-singer(s)	Language
1980	"Janma Janmanthara"	Swathu	G. Devarajan	P. Madhuri	Malayalam
1982	"Manhe Dhar Phan"	Ramnagari	Jaidev	Anuradha Paudwal	Hindi
1982	"Metho Khabu Se"	Ramnagari	Jaidev	Neelam Sahni	Hindi
1983	"Kare Kajrare Badra"	Amar Jyoti	Jaidev	Asha Bhosle	Hindi
1983	"Ae Jhuma Jhuma"	Abhilash	Saroj Patnaik	Aarti Mukherji	Odia
1984	"Jab Jab Aaye"	Dilavar	Manas Mukherjee	Asha Bhosle	Hindi
1985	"Kuch Door Hamare"	Aabshar-e-Ghazal	Hariharan	Asha Bhosle	Hindi
1985	"Pehle Bhi"	Aabshar-e-Ghazal	Hariharan	Asha Bhosle	Hindi
1985	"Rang Ras Barse"	Yaar Kasam	Usha Khanna	Usha Khanna	Hindi
1986	"Chhant Jaye"	Pachhtava	Gajanan	Aarti Mukherji	Hindi
1988	"Pyar Hua Iqrar"	UK Concert	Shankar–Jaikishan	Lata Mangeshkar	Hindi
1988	"Yeh Raat Bheegi"	UK Concert	Shankar–Jaikishan	Lata Mangeshkar	Hindi
1991	"Kabhi Main Kahoon"	Lamhe	Shiv-Hari	Lata Mangeshkar	Hindi
1992	"Jyotilingo Ka Dhyan Karo"	Shiv Mahima	Dilip Sen-Sameer Sen	Anuradha Paudwal	Hindi
1992	"Hey Shambhu Baba (Duet)"	Shiv Mahima	Dilip Sen-Sameer Sen	Anuradha Paudwal	Hindi
1992	"Hey Pita Parmatma (Duet)"	Anjaane Log	J. Jagdish	Shobha Joshi	Hindi
1992	"Dil Mein Hai Kya"	Jeena Marna Tere Sang	Dilip Sen-Sameer Sen	Anuradha Paudwal	Hindi
1992	"Asai Mella"	Annan Ennada Thambi Ennada	Gyan Varma	B.S. Sasirekha	Tamil
1993	"Likha Hai Yeh"	Darr	Shiv-Hari	Lata Mangeshkar	Hindi
1994	"Sanesh Wara"	Suryaputra Shanidev	Nandu Honap	Anuradha Paudwal	Hindi
1995	"Shivratri Ki Mahima"	Shiv Ke Charno Mein	Gulshan Kumar	Anuradha Paudwal	Hindi
1996	"Pakka Dil Bar Jaani"	Khel Khiladi Ka (Dubbed version)	A. R. Rahman	Asha Bhosle	Hindi
1996	"Tum Gaye (Duet)"	Maachis	Vishal Bhardwaj	Lata Mangeshkar	Hindi
1997	"Ek Duje Ke Vaaste"	Dil To Pagal Hai	Uttam Singh	Lata Mangeshkar	Hindi
1997	"Dil Ki Kalam Se"	Itihaas	Dilip Sen-Sameer Sen	Anuradha Paudwal	Hindi
1997	"Le Chalo Tum Jahan"	Angaarey	Dilip Sen	Anuradha Paudwal	Hindi
1997	"Karlo Karlo Charo Dham"	Char Dham	Surender Kohli	Anuradha Paudwal	Hindi
1997	"Shree Hanuman Chalisa (Duet)"	Shree Hanuman Chalisa Hanuman Ashtak	Lalit Sen & Chander	Anuradha Paudwal	Hindi
1997	"Engenge Engenge"	Nerukku Ner	Deva	Asha Bhosle	Tamil
1997	"Gare Dore"	Chachi 420	Vishal Bhardwaj	Asha Bhosle	Hindi
1997	"Sintha Mani"	Aahaa Enna Porutham	Vidhyasagar	S. Janaki	Tamil
1997	"Poothirukkum"	Pudhayal	Vidhyasagar	Uma Ramanan	Tamil
1997	"Yaaro Azhaithadhu"	Sishya	Deva	Uma Ramanan	Tamil
1998	"Hey Shiv Pita Parmatma"	Shiv Gungaan	Bhushan Dua	Anuradha Paudwal	Hindi
1998	"Aisi Subha Na Aaye (Duet)"	Shiv Gungaan	Bhushan Dua	Anuradha Paudwal	Hindi
1998	"Jai Ho Bholenath (Duet)"	Shankar Mera Pyara (vol. 1)	Surinder Kohli	Anuradha Paudwal	Hindi
1998	"Chalo Bhola Ke Dwar(Duet)"	Shree Kedarnath Amritwani	Surinder Kohli	Anuradha Paudwal	Hindi
1998	"Tu Mere Paas Bhi Hai"	Satya	Vishal Bhardwaj	Lata Mangeshkar	Hindi
1998	"Thum Dono Ver.1–2"	Sham Ghanasham	Vishal Bhardwaj	Lata Mangeshkar	Hindi
1999	"Iruvathu Vayadhu"	Kannodu Kaanbathellaam	Deva	S. Janaki	Tamil
1999	"Vaa Vaa Poove"	Rishi	Yuvan Shankar Raja	S. Janaki	Tamil
1999	"Chhai Chhap Chhai"	Hu Tu Tu	Vishal Bhardwaj	Lata Mangeshkar	Hindi
1999	"Itna Lamba Kash "	Hu Tu Tu	Vishal Bhardwaj	Lata Mangeshkar	Hindi
1999	"Jago Jago Hey Bhole"	Om Shiv Bhajan	Dilip Sen-Sameer Sen	Anuradha Paudwal	Hindi
1999	"Hum Saath Saath Hain"	Hum Saath Saath Hain	Raam-Laxman	Anuradha Paudwal	Hindi
1999	"Mahi Ribudami"	Hum Saath Saath Hain	Raam-Laxman	Anuradha Paudwal	Hindi
1999	"Poosu Manjal (Duet)"	Kanavae Kalayathae	Deva	Anuradha Paudwal	Tamil
2000	"Nee Partha"	Hey Ram	Ilaiyaraja	Asha Bhosle	Tamil
2000	"Janmon Ki Jawala Thi"	Hey Ram	Ilaiyaraja	Asha Bhosle	Hindi
2000	"Sai Sai Sai Preeth Sai"	Preethse	Hamsalekha	Anuradha Paudwal	Kannada
2000	"Yaarittari Chukki"	Preethse	Hamsalekha	Anuradha Paudwal	Kannada
2000	"Naaga Naagi"	Nagadevathe	Hamsalekha	Latha Hamsalekha	Kannada
2001	"Yeh Sochta Hai Kya"	Grahan	Karthik Raja	Asha Bhosle	Hindi
2001	"Nanna Preethiya"	Nanna Preethiya Hudugi	Mano Murthy	Anuradha Paudwal	Kannada
2001	"Yaaro Neenu"	Nanna Preethiya Hudugi	Mano Murthy	Anuradha Paudwal	Kannada
2003	"Bholaban Daree"	Shridiwale Sai Baba	Dilip Sen-Sameer Sen	Anuradha Paudwal	Hindi
2003	"Sirf Tum"	Sirf Tum	Nadeem-Shravan	Anuradha Paudwal	Hindi
2003	"Usko Paane Se (Duet)"	Ek Alag Mausam	Ravi	Anuradha Paudwal	Hindi
2006	"Shiv Sumiran Se (Duet)"	Shiv Sadhna	Devendra Dev	Anuradha Paudwal	Hindi
2007	"Jana Gana Mana (Duet)"	Jana Gana Manaa	A. R. Rahman	Lata Mangeshkar, Asha Bhosle	Hindi
2007	"Neenu Nannavanu"	Premigaagi Naa	Rajesh Ramanathan	S. Janaki	Kannada
2008	"Ruko Thoda Tum Thoda"	Chandramukhi Hindi dubbed	Vidyasagar	Anuradha Paudwal	Hindi
2010	"Aayiram Nilave Vaa"	Vijay TV Concert	KV Mahadevan	P. Susheela	Tamil
2011	"Geet Kab Sarhadein"	Sarhadein	Mayuresh Pai & Mehdi Hassan	Lata Mangeshkar, Usha Mangeshkar	Hindi
2014	"Ti Fa Ta Fa"	Sa re ga ma pa 2014	Hariharan, Asha Bhosle	Asha Bhosle	

=== II ===
Year	Song name	Film/Album/Concert name	Music director(s)	Co-singer(s)	Language
1987	"Ek Ta Dehiya Sukwar"	Godna	Chitragupta	Alka Yagnik	Bhojpuri
1987	"Patri Kamariya Lavangiya"	Godna	Chitragupta	Alka Yagnik	Bhojpuri
1989	"Samdhi Teri Ghodi"	Bade Ghar Ki Beti	Laxmikant–Pyarelal	Alka Yagnik	Hindi
1994	"Yeh Kanya Kunwari"	Aag	Dilip Sen-Sameer Sen	Alka Yagnik	Hindi
1994	"Gopa Re Badhuchi Kala Kanhei"	Gopa Re Badhuchi Kala Kanhei	Bachu Mukherjee	Sadhana Sargam	Odia
1995	"Tumhe Hum Bahut Pyar"	Jallad	Anand–Milind	Sadhana Sargam	Hindi
1995	"Dil Ne Dil Se"	Haqeeqat	Dilip Sen-Sameer Sen	Alka Yagnik	Hindi
1996	"Oru Theidi Parthaal"	Coimbatore Mappillai	Vidhyasagar	Sadhana Sargam	Tamil
1996	"Kannil Kannil"	Mustafa	Vidhyasagar	Sadhana Sargam	Tamil
1996	"Kuch Mere Dil Ne Kaha"	Tere Mere Sapne	Viju Shah	Sadhana Sargam	Hindi
1996	"Bhahoon Ke Dharmiya"	Khamoshi	Jatin–Lalit	Alka Yagnik	Hindi
1996	"Aakonge Baathe"	Halka Nasha	Utpal Biswas	Devaki Pandit	Hindi
1996	"Dhuniya Bhar Ki"	Halka Nasha	Utpal Biswas	Devaki Pandit	Hindi
1996	"Hum Tera"	Halka Nasha	Utpal Biswas	Devaki Pandit	Hindi
1996	"Halka Sa Ik Nasha"	Halka Nasha	Utpal Biswas	Devaki Pandit	Hindi
1996	"Kaise Jeeu Main"	Halka Nasha	Utpal Biswas	Devaki Pandit	Hindi
1997	"Raat Meheke"	Mrityudand	Anand–Milind	Sadhana Sargam	Hindi
1997	"Chanda Re"	Sapnay (Dubbed version)	A. R. Rahman	Sadhana Sargam	Hindi
1997	"Vennilave Vennilave"	Minsara Kanavu	A. R. Rahman	Sadhana Sargam	Tamil
1997	"Vennelave Vennelave"	Merupu Kalalu (Dubbed version)	A. R. Rahman	Sadhana Sargam	Telugu
1997	"Judaai Judaai 1–2"	Judaai	Nadeem-Shravan	Alka Yagnik	Hindi
1997	"Dil Ke Kalam 2"	Itihaas	Dilip Sen-Sameer Sen	Alka Yagnik	Hindi
1998	"Saawan Barse Tarse Dil"	Dahek	Anand–Milind	Sadhana Sargam	Hindi
1998	"Ajooba Hai"	Jeans (Dubbed version)	A. R. Rahman	Sadhana Sargam	Hindi
1998	"Tere Pyar Ki Aag"	Prem Aggan	Anu Malik	Sadhana Sargam	Hindi
1998	"Hardam Dam (Ver.1–2)"	Prem Aggan	Anu Malik	Sadhana Sargam	Hindi
1998	"Kattana Ponnu"	Naam Iruvar Namakku Iruvar	Karthik Raja	Sadhana Sargam	Tamil
1998	"Oonchi Oonchi Deewaron"	Achanak	Dilip Sen-Sameer Sen	Alka Yagnik	Hindi
1999	"Gup Chup Baatein"	Love You Hamesha	A. R. Rahman	Sadhana Sargam	Hindi
1999	"Chudidhar Adaindhu"	Poovellam Kettuppar	Yuvan Shankar Raja	Sadhana Sargam	Tamil
1999	"Konji Pesu"	Mannavaru Chinnavaru	Geethapriyan	Sadhana Sargam	Tamil
1999	"Manasae Manasae"	Nenjinile	Deva	Sadhana Sargam	Tamil
1999	"O Priya"	Arjun Pandit	Dilip Sen-Sameer Sen	Alka Yagnik	Hindi
1999	"Tere Dil Pe Naam Na Likh Do"	Kohram	Dilip Sen-Sameer Sen	Alka Yagnik	Hindi
1999	"Jawan Jawan Hai"	Bade Dilwala	Aadesh Shrivastav	Alka Yagnik	Hindi
2000	"Mottu Ondru"	Kushi	Deva	Sadhana Sargam	Tamil
2000	"Hum Bhi Samajh Rahe"	Ghaath	Anu Malik	Alka Yagnik	Hindi
2001	"Tu Hai Mere Dil Mein"	Chhupa Rustam	Anand–Milind	Sadhana Sargam	Hindi
2001	"Ragasiyamai"	Dumm Dumm Dumm	Karthik Raja	Sadhana Sargam	Tamil
2001	"Main Sochon"	Tera Mera Saath Rahen	Anand Raj Anand	Alka Yagnik	Hindi
2001	"Dil Hamara Hua Hai"	Albela	Jatin–Lalit	Alka Yagnik	Hindi
2001	"Aaye Jabse Woh"	Gori Teri Aankhein	Lucky Ali	Alka Yagnik	Hindi
2001	"Tum Lakh Chupe Ho"	Pyaar Ishq Aur Mohabbat	Viju Shah	Janki Parikh, Alka Yagnik	Hindi
2002	"Do Dil Humne-Hum Aur Tum"	Durga	Vidhyasagar	Sadhana Sargam	Hindi
2002	"Vennilavin Perai"	Ramanaa	Ilaiyaraja	Sadhana Sargam	Tamil
2002	"Vaanaville (Duet)"	Ramanaa	Ilaiyaraja	Sadhana Sargam	Tamil
2002	"Enna Solli Paduvadho"	En Mana Vaanil	Ilaiyaraja	Sadhana Sargam	Tamil
2002	"Mottugale Mottugale"	Roja Kootam	Bharadwaj	Sadhana Sargam	Tamil
2002	"Tere Bina Zindagi Se"	Dil Vil Pyar Vyar	R.D. Burman, Babloo Chakravorty	Alka Yagnik	Hindi
2002	"Chali Saat Phere Lekar"	Roshini	Anand–Milind	Alka Yagnik	Hindi
2002	"Om Jai Jagadish 1–2"	Om Jai Jagadish	Anu Malik	Alka Yagnik	Hindi
2002	"Aa Saath Aa"	Tum Aaye	Many..	Alka Yagnik	Hindi-Urdu
2002	"Kya Tumhe Bhi Aisa"	Tum Aaye	Many..	Alka Yagnik	Hindi-Urdu
2002	"Kya Tumhe Pata Hai"	Tum Aaye	Many..	Alka Yagnik	Hindi-Urdu
2002	"Meri Yaadon Mein Ab Tak"	Tum Aaye	Many..	Alka Yagnik	Hindi-Urdu
2002	"Mujhe Aaj Tune"	Tum Aaye	Many..	Alka Yagnik	Hindi-Urdu
2002	"Nazaare Jaage"	Tum Aaye	Many..	Alka Yagnik	Hindi-Urdu
2002	"Tum Aaye 1&2"	Tum Aaye	Many..	Alka Yagnik	Hindi-Urdu
2002	"Tum Jo Mile"	Tum Aaye	Many..	Alka Yagnik	Hindi-Urdu
2002	"Manasutho"	Manasutho	Ashirwad	Alka Yagnik	Telugu
2003	"Anbe Anbe"	Anbe Anbe	Bharadwaj	Sadhana Sargam	Tamil
2003	"Nilavinile Oliyeduththu"	Manasellam	Ilaiyaraja	Sadhana Sargam	Tamil
2003	"Neethoongum Nerathil (Duet)"	Manasellam	Ilaiyaraja	Sadhana Sargam	Tamil
2003	"Thavamindri Kidaitha 1 & 2"	Anbu	Vidhyasagar	Sadhana Sargam	Tamil
2003	"En Jannal"	Chokka Thangam	Deva	Sadhana Sargam	Tamil
2003	"Muthan Mudhalaga"	Engal Anna	Deva	Sadhana Sargam	Tamil
2003	"Udhaya Udhaya"	Udhaya	A.R. Rahman	Sadhana Sargam	Tamil
2003	"Maankuttiyae (Duet 2)"	Priyamana Thozhi	S. A. Rajkumar	Sadhana Sargam	Tamil
2003	"Tum Bhi Na Mano"	The Hero	Uttam Singh	Alka Yagnik	Hindi
2004	"Kitni Baatein"	Lakshaya	Shankar–Ehsaan–Loy	Sadhana Sargam	Hindi
2004	"Kitni Baatein (Reprise)"	Lakshaya	Shankar–Ehsaan–Loy	Sadhana Sargam	Hindi
2004	"Shatamana Mannadilee"	Mrugaraju	Mani Sharma	Sadhana Sargam	Telugu
2004	"Kaadu Thirande"	Vasool Raja MBBS	Bharadwaj	Sadhana Sargam	Tamil
2004	"Valaiyosai Valaikindrathe"	Gomathy Nayagam	M. Jayachandran	Sadhana Sargam	Tamil
2004	"Kuch Bhi Nahin"	Shaadi Karke Phas Gaya Yaar	Uttam Singh	Alka Yagnik	Hindi
2004	"Chilman Chilman"	Kisna: The Warrior Poet	Ismail Darbar	Alka Yagnik	Hindi
2004	"Thum Abhi (Duet)"	Dobara	Anu Malik	Alka Yagnik	Hindi
2004	"Sadhiyaan Shamaa"	Lakeer	A. R. Rahman	Madhushree	Hindi
2004	"Naa Kaatuka"	Intlo Srimathi Veedhilo Kumari	Ghantadi Krishna	Madhushree	Telugu
2005	"Uyire Piriyathe"	Adaikalam	Sabesh–Murali	Sadhana Sargam	Tamil
2005	"Maragatha Mazhaithuli"	Power of Women	Vidhyasagar	Sadhana Sargam	Tamil
2005	"Kaatril Varum Geethame"	Oru Naal Oru Kanavu	Ilaiyaraja	Sadhana Sargam	Tamil
2005	"Saanjh Jhali Tari (Duet)"	Sarivar Sari	Bhasakar Chandavarkar	Sadhana Sargam	Marathi
2005	"Khaali Hai Tere Bina"	Paheli	Aadesh Shrivastava, MM Kreem	Bela Shende	Hindi
2006	"Azhaga Azhaga"	By2	Vijay Antony	Sadhana Sargam	Tamil
2006	"Poovin Madiyil"	By2	Vijay Antony	Sadhana Sargam	Tamil
2006	"Roja Poovin"	By2	Vijay Antony	Sadhana Sargam	Tamil
2006	"Siggutho Chi Chi"	Stalin	Mani Sharma	Sadhana Sargam	Telugu
2006	"Orumurai Piranthen"	Nenjirukkum Varai	Srikanth Deva	Sadhana Sargam	Tamil
2006	"Jaadu Jaadu"	Sri Ram Mandir	M. M. Kreem	Sadhana Sargam	Hindi
2006	"Hylessaa"	Sri Ram Mandir	M. M. Kreem	Sadhana Sargam	Hindi
2006	"Charanome Ho Sannidhi"	Sri Ram Mandir	M. M. Kreem	Sadhana Sargam	Hindi
2006	"Badrasaila Raj Mandir"	Sri Ram Mandir	M. M. Kreem	Sadhana Sargam	Hindi
2006	"Ay Hairathe"	Guru	A. R. Rahman	Alka Yagnik	Hindi
2007	"Tamizh Chelvi"	Koodal Nagar	Sabesh–Murali	Sadhana Sargam	Tamil
2007	"Achuta Azaghai"	Manasae Mounama	Naga	Sadhana Sargam	Tamil
2007	"Mooga Manasu"	Navavasantham	S. A. Rajkumar	Sadhana Sargam	Telugu
2007	"Palavellila Nuvvu"	Sri Rama Chanrulu	Ghantadi Krishna	Sadhana Sargam	Telugu
2007	"Mallelo Illelo"	Anumanaspadam	Ilaiyaraja	Sadhana Sargam	Telugu
2007	"Enna Thavam Purindhaen"	Nenjaithodu	Srikanth Deva	Sadhana Sargam	Tamil
2007	"Neloori – Kurukku"	A. R. Rahman – Concert	A. R. Rahman	Sadhana Sargam	Telugu – Tamil
2007	"Vaaji Vaaji"	Sivaji	A. R. Rahman	Madhushree	Tamil
2007	"Vaaji Vaaji"	Sivaji	A. R. Rahman	Madhushree	Hindi
2007	"Vaaji Vaaji"	Sivaji	A. R. Rahman	Madhushree	Telugu
2007	"Ragasiya Kanavugal"	Bheema	Harris Jayaraj	Madhushree	Tamil
2007	"Rahasyapu Kalale"	Bheema	Harris Jayaraj	Madhushree	Telugu
2008	"Aa Vaipunna Ee Vaipunna"	Maska	Chakri	Sadhana Sargam	Telugu
2008	"Nee Hinde Bandaga"	Shivamani	Veer Samarth	Sadhana Sargam	Kannada
2008	"Solla Solla"	Thiruvannamalai	Srikanth Deva	Sadhana Sargam	Tamil
2008	"Ay Herathe"	A. R. Rahman – Delhi Concert	A. R. Rahman	Sadhana Sargam	Hindi
2008	"Ghanan Ghanan"	A. R. Rahman – Delhi Concert	A. R. Rahman	Sadhana Sargam	Hindi
2008	"Vaari Vaari"	A. R. Rahman – Dubai Concert	A. R. Rahman	Sadhana Sargam	Hindi
2008	"Kaadhal Rojave"	A. R. Rahman – Dubai Concert	A. R. Rahman	Sadhana Sargam	Tamil – Hindi
2008	"Naan Varainthu"	Jayam Kondaan	Vidhyasagar	Madhushree	Tamil
2008	"Nee Nee Nee"	Machchakaran	Yuvan Shankar Raja	Madhushree	Tamil
2009	"Guru Brahmma"	Sooriyan Satta kalluri	Deva	Sadhana Sargam	Tamil
2009	"Yaamini Yaamini"	Aarumugam	Deva	Sadhana Sargam	Tamil
2009	"Pyar Ki Parsayee"	Ruslaan	Raeess Jamal Khan	Sadhana Sargam	Hindi
2009	"Ay Hairathe (Unplugged)"	A. R. Rahman – Delhi Unplugged	A. R. Rahman	Sadhana Sargam	Hindi
2009	"Vaaji Vaaji"	A. R. Rahman – Pune Concert	A. R. Rahman	Sadhana Sargam	Tamil
2009	"Mumbai Antheme"	The Mumbai Antheme	Sonu Nigam	Alka Yagnik	Hindi
2010	"Arima Arima"	Enthiran	A. R. Rahman	Sadhana Sargam	Tamil
2010	"Arima Arima"	Robot (Dubbed version)	A. R. Rahman	Sadhana Sargam	Hindi
2010	"Arima Arima"	Robot (Dubbed version)	A. R. Rahman	Sadhana Sargam	Telugu
2010	"Ay Hairathe"	A. R. Rahman – Sydney Concert	A. R. Rahman	Sadhana Sargam	Hindi
2010	"Udhaya (Unplugged)"	A. R. Rahman – Sydney Concert	A. R. Rahman	Sadhana Sargam	Tamil
2010	"Naane Ennul Illai"	Naane Ennul Illai	Amresh Ganash	Sadhana Sargam	Tamil
2010	"Naane Ennul (Classic)"	Naane Ennul Illai	Amresh Ganash	Sadhana Sargam	Tamil
2010	"Kanuppa Pallo-Evare Manna"	Sambho Siva Sambho	Sundar C Babu	Sadhana Sargam	Telugu
2010	"Kandenae Kaadhal"	Maasi	Dhina	Sadhana Sargam	Tamil
2010	"Hanuman Chalisa (Duet)"	The Power Of Hanuman Chalisa	Ashit Desai	Sadhana Sargam	Hindu
2010	"Pillanagrovi "	Chethilo Cheyyesi	Bunty	Alka Yagnik	Telugu
2010	"Ada Da En Meedhu"	Pathiranu	Yuvan Shankar Raja	Bela Shende	Tamil
2011	"Solla Vanden (Duet)"	Suzhal	L.V. Ganeshan	Sadhana Sargam	Tamil
2011	"Naaku Oka Loverundi"	Naaku O Loverundi	K. M. Radhakrishnan	Sadhana Sargam	Telugu
2011	"Om Bhoor(Duet)"	The Power Of Gayatri	Ashit Desai	Sadhana Sargam	Hindu
2011	"Sri Krishna (Duet)"	The Magic Of Krishna	Ashit Desai	Sadhana Sargam	Hindu
2011	"Nau Meri"	Kashmakash	Raja Narayan Deb	Madhushree	Hindi
2012	"Kaatrilellam Inbam"	Udumban	Balan	Sadhana Sargam	Tamil
2012	"Chanda Re"	Sa re ga ma pa 2012	A. R. Rahman	Sadhana Sargam	Hindi
2012	"Kuch Mere Dil Ne Kaha (Bit)"	Sa re ga ma pa 2012	Viju Shah	Sadhana Sargam	Hindi
2012	"Na Gul Khile Hain (Bit)"	Sa re ga ma pa 2012		Sadhana Sargam	Hindi
2012	"Kya Pukaren Tumhen"	Rajnigandha	Sudeep Banerjee	Alka Yagnik	Hindi
2013	"Nee Partha Parvaikoru"	Ilaiyaraja – Toronto Concert	Ilaiyaraja	Sadhana Sargam	Tamil
2013	"Majhya Savve"	Koknasth	Akshay Hariharan	Sadhana Sargam	Marathi
2013	"Satrangi Jaadugar"	100 Years of Indian Cinema	Shantanu Moitra	Alka Yagnik, Sadhana Sargam	Hindi
2014	"Kaatril Varum Geethame"	Ilaiyaraja Madurai Concert	Ilaiyaraja	Sadhana Sargam	Tamil
2014	"Muthan Muthalil..."	Sa re ga ma pa 2014	Deva, Un known	Alka Yagnik	Hindi
2014	"Tum Jo Mil Gaye Ho"	Sa re ga ma pa 2014	Madan Mohan	Alka Yagnik	Hindi
2014	"Balla Balla Subhanallah (Bit)"	Sa re ga ma pa 2014	Hariharan, Alka Yagnik	Alka Yagnik	Hindi
2014	"Aaj Mausam Bada (Bit)"	Sa re ga ma pa 2014	Laxmikant Pyarela	Alka Yagnik	Hindi
2014	"Gulabi Ankhen"	Sa re ga ma pa 2014	R D Burman	Alka Yagnik	Hindi
2014	"Bhahoon Ke Dharmiya (Bit)"	Sa re ga ma pa 2014	Jatin–Lalit	Alka Yagnik	Hindi
2014	"Phoolon Ke Rang Se (Bit)"	Sa re ga ma pa 2014	S D Burman	Alka Yagnik	Hindi
2014	"Aaja Tujhko Pukare"	Sa re ga ma pa 2014	Ravi	Alka Yagnik	Hindi
2014	"Kutramulla"	Kalavadiya Pozhudhugal	Bharadwaj	Sadhana Sargam	Tamil
2015	"Avuna Neevena"	Rudramadevi	Ilaiyaraja	Sadhana Sargam	Telugu
2015	"Hai Rama (Bit)"	Dadagiri Unlimited Season 5	A. R. Rahman	Madhushree	Hindi
2015	"Unnal Un Munnal"	Rudramadevi (Dubbed version)	Ilaiyaraja	Sadhana Sargam	Tamil
2017	"Nee Paarththa Paarvaikkoru"	One Man Show -Ilaiyaraja	Ilaiyaraja	Sadhana Sargam	Tamil
2018	"Bhima Janna Tujha"	Yugandhar	Buphesh Sawai	Madhushree	Marathi

=== III ===
Year	Song name	Film/Album/Concert name	Music director(s)	Co-singer(s)	Language
1992	"Roja Janeman"	Roja (Dubbed version)	A. R. Rahman	Sujatha Mohan	Hindi
1995	"Hai Rama"	Rangeela	A. R. Rahman	Swarnalatha	Hindi
1995	"Hai Rama"	Rangeela (Dubbed version)	A. R. Rahman	Swarnalatha	Tamil
1995	"Hai Rama"	Rangeli (Dubbed version)	A. R. Rahman	Swarnalatha	Telugu
1995	"Kuchchi Kuchchi Raakamma"	Bombay	A. R. Rahman	Swarnalatha	Tamil
1995	"Kuchchi Kuchchi Kannamma"	Bombay (Dubbed version)	A. R. Rahman	Swarnalatha	Telugu
1995	"Konja Naal"	Aasai	Deva	Sujatha Mohan	Tamil
1995	"Konchem Agara"	Asha Asha Asha (Dubbed version)	Deva	Sujatha Mohan	Telugu
1995	"Mahire Mahire"	Haiyya	A. R. Rahman, Raju Singh	Kavita Paudwal	Hindi
1996	"Kadhala Kadhala"	Avvai Shanmughi	Deva	Sujatha Mohan	Tamil
1996	"En Manathai"	Kalloori Vaasal	Deva	Anuradha Sriram	Tamil
1996	"Un Uthatora"	Panchalankurichi	Deva	Anuradha Sriram	Tamil
1996	"Uchchi Muthal Patham"	Sengottai	Vidhyasagar	Bombay Mithili	Tamil
1997	"Chandiranai Thottathu"	Ratchagan	A. R. Rahman	Sujatha Mohan	Tamil
1997	"Chandrunni Dhakki"	Rakshakudu	A. R. Rahman	Sujatha Mohan	Telugu
1997	"Tum Ho Meri Nigahon Mein"	Kabhi Na Kabhi	A. R. Rahman	Sujatha Mohan	Hindi
1997	"Kal Nahi Tha Woh (Sad)"	Vishwavidhaata	A. R. Rahman	Sujatha Mohan	Hindi
1997	"Thilothamaa Priya"	Master	Deva	Sujatha Mohan	Telugu
1997	"Kadhala Kadhala"	Surya Vamsam	S. A. Rajkumar	Swarnalatha	Tamil
1997	"Rosaapoo (Duet)"	Surya Vamsam	S. A. Rajkumar	Sujatha Mohan	Tamil
1997	"Pappa Pappa"	Mannava	Deva	Swarnalatha	Tamil
1997	"Tajmahale Nee"	Periya Thambi	Deva	Anuradha Sriram	Tamil
1998	"Etho Etho Nenjil"	Manam Virumbuthe Unnai	Ilaiyaraja	Sujatha Mohan	Tamil
1998	"Chandamama"	Auto Driver	Deva	Sujatha Mohan	Telugu
1998	"Etho Orupaattu (Duet)"	Unnidathil Ennai Koduthen	S. A. Rajkumar	Sujatha Mohan	Tamil
1998	"Navami Dasami"	Bavagaru Bagunnara	Mani Sharma	Sujatha Mohan	Telugu
1998	"Rajaham Savo"	Ganesh	Mani Sharma	Sujatha Mohan	Telugu
1998	"Itharku Peyar"	Pooveli	Bharadwaj	Sujatha Mohan	Tamil
1998	"Chekka Sivanthavale"	Swayamvaram	Sirpy	Sujatha Mohan	Tamil
1998	"Malaiyum Nathiyum"	Kadhal Vedham	Utpal Biswas	Sujatha Mohan	Tamil
1998	"Iru Kannum"	Kadhal Vedham	Utpal Biswas	Sujatha Mohan	Tamil
1998	"En Nenjil"	Kadhal Vedham	Utpal Biswas	Sujatha Mohan	Tamil
1998	"Uyire Uyire Nalamthana"	Iniyavale	Deva	Swarnalatha	Tamil
1998	"Nandha Vaname"	Jolly	Kavi	Swarnalatha	Tamil
1998	"Malarodu Piranththavalaa"	Iniyavale	Deva	Anuradha Sriram	Tamil
1998	"Gnabagam Irukkiratha"	Sandhippoma	Deva	Anuradha Sriram	Tamil
1998	"Chinna Chinna Kiliye"	Kannedhirey Thondrinal	Deva	Anuradha Sriram	Tamil
1998	"Anbe Anbe"	Jeans	A. R. Rahman	Anuradha Sriram	Tamil
1998	"Tauba Tauba"	Jeans (Dubbed version)	A. R. Rahman	Anuradha Sriram	Hindi
1998	"Tum Hi Ho"	Angaarey	Raju Singh	Kavita Paudwal	Hindi
1998	"Intha Siripinai"	Naam Iruvar Namakku Iruvar	Karthik Raja	Vibha Sharma	Tamil
1999	"Kanulake Kanukale"	Time	Ilaiyaraja	Sujatha Mohan	Telugu
1999	"Neethaana Neethaana"	Unnai Thedi	Deva	Sujatha Mohan	Tamil
1999	"Solla Vanthein"	Kadhal Solla Vandhen	Deva	Sujatha Mohan	Tamil
1999	"Soolaikkuyil Paadum"	Anantha Poongatre	Deva	Sujatha Mohan	Tamil
1999	"Unpeyar Solla"	Anantha Poongatre	Deva	Sujatha Mohan	Tamil
1999	"Kadhal Azhaga"	Paattali	S. A. Rajkumar	Sujatha Mohan	Tamil
1999	"Oru Devathai"	Nee Varuvai Ena	S. A. Rajkumar	Solo	Tamil
1999	"Nuvve Nuvve"	Kalisundam Raa	S. A. Rajkumar	Sujatha Mohan	Telugu
1999	"Premante Yemitante"	Seenu	Mani Sharma	Sujatha Mohan	Telugu
1999	"Sandesham"	Annayya	Mani Sharma	Sujatha Mohan	Telugu
1999	"Nilave Nilave"	Periyanna	Bharani	Sujatha Mohan	Tamil
1999	"Iravaa Pagalaa"	Poovellam Kettuppar	Yuvan Shankar Raja	Sujatha Mohan	Tamil
1999	"Oh Mane Mane (duet)"	Rishi	Yuvan Shankar Raja	Sujatha Mohan	Tamil
1999	"Malare Oru"	Poomagal Oorvalam	Siva Shankar	Sujatha Mohan	Tamil
1999	"Yevaro Aa Sundari"	Yamajathakudu	Vandemataram Srinivas	Sujatha Mohan	Telugu
1999	"Nilavonnu Pattikichu"	Edhirum Pudhirum	Vidhyasagar	Swarnalatha	Tamil
1999	"O Nenje Nenje"	Mugavari	Deva	Swarnalatha	Tamil
1999	"Cheluvinoora Chendagaati"	O Premave	V. Ravichandran	Anuradha Sriram	Kannada
1999	"Nee Irunthaal Naan"	Aasaiyil Oru Kaditham	Deva	Anuradha Sriram	Tamil
1999	"Tholaivinile Vaanam"	Kodiesvaran	Kabileshwar	Anuradha Sriram	Tamil
1999	"Eruvaka"	Oke Okkadu (Dubbed version)	A. R. Rahman	Swarnalatha	Telugu
2000	"Pachai Marikozhunthu"	Azhagarsamy	Deva	Sujatha Mohan	Tamil
2000	"Puravea En"	Eazhaiyin Sirippil	Deva	Sujatha Mohan	Tamil
2000	"Uyirae Uyire Azhaiththa"	Uyirile Kalanthathu	Deva	Sujatha Mohan	Tamil
2000	"Kannazhaghe (Duet)"	Kannal Pesava	Deva	Sujatha Mohan	Tamil
2000	"Mazhai Mazhai"	Suthantiram	S. A. Rajkumar	Sujatha Mohan	Tamil
2000	"Ennenemo Matram"	Suthantiram	S. A. Rajkumar	Sujatha Mohan	Tamil
2000	"Kaathal-Vaanil Vennila"	Vanathai Pola	S. A. Rajkumar	Sujatha Mohan	Tamil
2000	"Kaathukku Pookkal"	Kannan Varuvan	Sirpy	Sujatha Mohan	Tamil
2000	"Melasatham"	Thaali Kaatha Kaaliamman	Sirpy	Sujatha Mohan	Tamil
2000	"Muthum Pavizhavum"	Darling Darling	Ouseppachan	Sujatha Mohan	Malayalam
2000	"Rasathi En"	Penn Ondru Kanden	Kavi	Swarnalatha	Tamil
2000	"Thuli Thuliyai"	Paarvai Ondre Podhume	Bharani	Swarnalatha	Tamil
2000	"Tere Hothon Ki Hansi"	Bichhoo	Anand Raj Anand	Swarnalatha	Hindi
2000	"Ammamma Mayagade"	Pelli Sambhandham	S. A. Rajkumar	Swarnalatha	Telugu
2000	"Manja Manja"	Simmasanam	S. A. Rajkumar	Swarnalatha	Tamil
2000	"Oru Ponnu"	Kushi	Deva	Anuradha Sriram	Tamil
2000	"Oka Konte Pillani"	Naaga	Deva	Anuradha Sriram	Telugu
2000	"Chiththiraiye Adi"	En Purusan Kuzhanthai Mathiri	Deva	Anuradha Sriram	Tamil
2000	"Raathiri Vejil Tharum"	Appu	Deva	Anuradha Sriram	Tamil
2000	"Nee Yaarele"	Preethsu Thappenila	V. Ravichandran	Anuradha Sriram	Kannada
2001	"Pengaloda Potti"	Friends	Ilaiyaraja	Sujatha Mohan	Tamil
2001	"Hai Rama"	A. R. Rahman – Dubai Concert	A. R. Rahman	Sujatha Mohan	Hindi
2001	"Aruppu Kotai"	Vallarasu	Deva	Sujatha Mohan	Tamil
2001	"Vinothamanavale En"	Lovely	Deva	Sujatha Mohan	Tamil
2001	"Kanchare Kanchare"	Kalasi Naduddam	S. A. Rajkumar	Sujatha Mohan	Telugu
2001	"Okka Sari Krindiki"	Kalasi Naduddam	S. A. Rajkumar	Sujatha Mohan	Telugu
2001	"Telusa Nestama"	Simharasi	S. A. Rajkumar	Sujatha Mohan	Telugu
2001	"Muthar Poo"	Vedham	Vidhyasagar	Swarnalatha	Tamil
2001	"Ammammama Thangadhu"	Middle Class Madhavan	Dhina	Sujatha Mohan	Tamil
2001	"Enno Enno"	Naalo Vunna Prema	Koti	Sujatha Mohan	Telugu
2001	"Chelia Nee Premalone"	Snehamante Idera	Siva Shankar	Sujatha Mohan	Telugu
2001	"Anuragam Anuragam"	Bava Nachadu	M.M. Keeravani	Sujatha Mohan	Telugu
2001	"Mamara Kavil"	Mazha Megapravukal	Sree Ram	Anuradha Sriram	Malayalam
2002	"Thaalattum Katre"	Devan	Ilaiyaraja	Sujatha Mohan	Tamil
2002	"Sakalakala Vallavane"	Pammal K Sambantham	Deva	Sujatha Mohan	Tamil
2002	"Sundari"	Kannathil Muthamittal	A. R. Rahman	Sujatha Mohan	Tamil
2002	"Chanda Mama"	Seema Simham	Mani Sharma	Sujatha Mohan	Telugu
2002	"Kadhale Kadhale"	Kadhale Swasam	D. Imman	Sujatha Mohan	Tamil
2002	"Megame Megame"	Kuruvamma	Sahitya	Sujatha Mohan	Tamil
2002	"Ringa Ringa"	Thaniyae Thannanthaniyae	Rajneesh	Sujatha Mohan	Tamil
2002	"Premave Premave"	Banallu Neene Buviyallu Neene	Prashanth Raj	Anuradha Sriram	Kannada
2003	"Dolnaa Dolnaa"	Parasuram	A. R. Rahman	Sujatha Mohan	Tamil
2003	"Megathil Ondrai"	Kadhal Sadugudu	Deva	Sujatha Mohan	Tamil
2003	"Entha Panjesindee"	Dongodu	Vidhyasagar	Sujatha Mohan	Telugu
2003	"Maan Kutiye"	Priyamana Thozhi	S.A. Rajkumar	Sujatha Mohan	Tamil
2003	"Ammo Amayena"	Vasantham	S.A. Rajkumar	Sujatha Mohan	Telugu
2003	"Samimela Sathiyama"	Yes Madam	Bharani	Sujatha Mohan	Tamil
2003	"Oru Murai Sonnal "	Anbe Diana	Gnani	Sujatha Mohan	Tamil
2004	"Yaaro Nee"	Sullan	Vidhyasagar	Sujatha Mohan	Tamil
2004	"Rokkam Irrukira"	Kasi	Ilaiyaraja	Sujatha Mohan	Tamil
2004	"Happy New Year"	Cheppave Chirugaali	S.A. Rajkumar	Sujatha Mohan	Telugu
2004	"O Hampi Bomma"	Leela Mahal Center	S.A. Rajkumar	Sujatha Mohan	Telugu
2004	"Kangal Theendi"	Vaanam Vasapadum	Mahesh	Sujatha Mohan	Tamil
2004	"Thongi Thongi"	Yagnam	Mani Sharma	Swarnalatha	Telugu
2004	"Aariya Udhadu"	Chellame	Harris Jayaraj	Swarnalatha	Tamil
2004	"Karunaadina"	Sarvabhouma	Hamsalekha	Anuradha Paudwal	Kannada
2005	"Mazhaiyae (Duet)"	June R	Sharreth	Sujatha Mohan	Tamil
2005	"Shahiba Shahiba"	Daas	Yuvan Shankar Raja	Sujatha Mohan	Tamil
2006	"Thadakku Thadak"	Aathi	Vidhyasagar	Sujatha Mohan	Tamil
2006	"Vennela Vennela"	Raja Babu	S.A. Rajkumar	Sujatha Mohan	Telugu
2007	"Ee Haayilo"	Gurukanth (Dubbed version)	A. R. Rahman	Sujatha Mohan	Telugu
2008	"Sollamma Sollamma"	Kuselan	G.V. Prakash Kumar	Sujatha Mohan	Tamil
2008	"Challe Challe "	Kathanayakudu	G.V. Prakash Kumar	Sujatha Mohan	Telugu
2009	"Andamaina Andama"	Ninnu Kalisaka	Sunil Kashyap	Sujatha Mohan	Telugu
2009	"Mogamma Illai"	Indira Vizha	Yadhish	Sujatha Mohan	Tamil
2009	"Annu Thonnaaththa (Duet)"	Sneham Enikk Sneham	S. Sanal Kumar	Sujatha Mohan	Malayalam
2009	"Indha Vaanam"	Katrathu Kalavu	Vinayak Manohar	Anuradha Sriram	Tamil
2010	"Aahko Chahiye"	Makaramanju	Ramesh Narayan	Sujatha Mohan	Malayalam-Hindi
2010	"Kaanuva Methe"	Makaramanju	Ramesh Narayan	Sujatha Mohan	Malayalam-Hindi
2010	"Unnai Ninaithadhume"	Aadu Puli	Sundar C Babu	Sujatha Mohan	Tamil
2010	"Neeya Yennai"	Ethirmarai	Murugan Mohan	Anuradha Sriram	Tamil
2012	"Pallikoodam Mudhalmani"	Udumban	S. Balan	Anuradha Sriram	Tamil
2012	"Malargale Malargale"	Idea Star Singer season 6 Grand Finale	A. R. Rahman	Anuradha Sriram	Tamil

=== IV ===
Year	Song name	Film/Album/Concert name	Music director(s)	Co-singer(s)	Language
1996	"Telephone Manipol"	Indian	A. R. Rahman	Harini	Tamil
1996	"Telephone"	Bharateeyudu (Dubbed version)	A. R. Rahman	Harini	Telugu
1996	"Appappo Thulluthu"	Ninne Pelladata	Sandeep Chowtha	Sowmya Raoh	Telugu
1996	"Abha Abha "	Unaiye Kalyaanam Pannikirein	Sandeep Chowtha	Sowmya Raoh	Tamil
1996	"Jawani Kyun"	Jab Dil Kisi Pe Aata Hai	Sandeep Chowtha	Sowmya Raoh	Hindi
1996	"Kotta Kottaga"	Sampradayam	S.V. Krishna Reddy	M. M. Srileka	Telugu
1997	"Konjum Manjal"	Ullasam	Karthik Raja	Harini	Tamil
1997	"Aalpsmalai Kaatru"	Thedinen Vanthathu	Sirpy	Bhavatharini	Tamil
1997	"All The Best"	Aravinthan	Yuvan Shankar Raja	Bhavatharini	Tamil
1997	"Nantri Solla"	Marumalarchi	S.A. Rajkumar	Amudha	Tamil
1997	"Cha Cha Cha"	Janakiraman	Sirpy	Nirmala	Tamil
1997	"Ennai Thaalatta"	Kadhalukku Mariyadhai	Ilaiyaraja	Bhavatharini	Tamil
1998	"Laila Laila"	Kaathala Kaathala	Karthik Raja	Bhavatharini	Tamil
1998	"Izhavenir Kaala"	Manam Virumbuthe Unnai	Ilaiyaraja	Bhavatharini	Tamil
1998	"Koottu Kuyilai"	Manam Virumbuthe Unnai	Ilaiyaraja	Bhavatharini	Tamil
1998	"Madona Saayala Nee"	Kaathala Kaathala	Karthik Raja	Bhavatharini	Tamil
1998	"Oivedu Oivedu"	Velai	Yuvan Shankar Raja	Bhavatharini	Tamil
1999	"Ootha Ootha"	Minsara Kanna	Deva	Harini	Tamil
1999	"Keechchu Kiliye (Duet)"	Mugavari	Deva	Harini	Tamil
1999	"Vanna Paravaigalai"	Masilaa Unmai Kaadhale	Deva	Harini	Tamil
1999	"Srirangam Petruthantha"	Paattali	S. A. Rajkumar	Harini	Tamil
1999	"Hima Semalloyallo"	Annayya	Mani Sharma	Harini	Telugu
1999	"Chinna Vennilave"	Poomagal Oorvalam	Siva Shankar	Harini	Tamil
1999	"Thavikiren Thavikiren"	Time	Ilaiyaraja	Bhavatharini	Tamil
1999	"Shock Adikum Poove"	Thodarum	Ilaiyaraja	Gopika Poornima	Tamil
2000	"Ae Deva Deva"	Uyirile Kalanthathu	Deva	Harini	Tamil
2000	"Ninaithal Nenjukuzhi"	Appu	Deva	Harini	Tamil
2000	"Velinaatu Kaatru "	Vanavil	Deva	Harini	Tamil
2000	"Love Is The Feeling"	Sakutumba Saparivara Sametam	S.V. Krishna Reddy	Harini	Telugu
2000	"Vanjikodi Vanthu"	Kanna Unnai Thedukiren	Ilaiyaraja	Bhavatharini	Tamil
2000	Vennilave Vennilave"	Kannan Varuvaan	Sirpy	Febi Mani	Tamil
2001	"Australia"	Citizen	Deva	Harini	Tamil
2001	"Kandupidi Kandupidi"	Samuthiram	Sabesh–Murali	Harini	Tamil
2001	"Thendral Varum"	Friends	Ilaiyaraja	Bhavatharini	Tamil
2001	"Sadugudu"	Manadhai Thirudivittai	Yuvan Shankar Raja	Bhavatharini	Tamil
2001	"Kombu Mulaitha"	Virumbukiren	Deva	Salpi	Tamil
2001	"Chick Chick"	Azhagana Naatkal	Deva	Isan	Tamil
2001	"Padha Padha"	Jabili	S.V. Krishna Reddy	Snehapanth	Telugu
2002	"Thamizhe Then"	Nilavinilae	Deva	Harini	Tamil
2002	"Sakiye Sakiye"	Youth	Mani Sharma	Harini	Tamil
2002	"Sirf Ehsaas"	Mitr, My Friend	Bhavatharini	Bhavatharini	Hindi
2002	"Manasa Thotta Kadhal"	Kaadhal Kavithai	Ilaiyaraja	Bhavatharini	Tamil
2002	"Geetham Sangeetham"	Nee Thodu Kavali	Sandeep & Valisha Baabji	Usha	Telugu
2002	"Innallu"	Andam	Gantadi Krishna	Usha	Telugu
2003	"Pudichirukku"	Saamy	Harris Jayaraj	Mahathi	Tamil
2004	"Thottaal Poo Malarum"	New	A. R. Rahman	Harini	Tamil
2004	"Vastha Neevenuka"	Naani	A. R. Rahman	Harini	Telugu
2004	"Kothaga Melukondi"	Maharani	Deva	Harini	Telugu
2004	"Oh Priya"	Premalo Pavini Kalyan	Ghantadi Krishna	Gopika Poornima	Telugu
2004	"Swasam Thantha"	Vaanam Vasappadum	Mahesh	Ganga	Tamil
2004	"Hrydaya Ragam"	Quotation	Sabeesh George	Manju Menon	Malayalam
2004	"Ee Velayee"	Maa Intikoste Em Testaru	Gantadi Krishna	Nishma	Telugu
2005	"Iyangaaru Veedu"	Anniyan	Harris Jayaraj	Harini	Tamil
2005	"Ayan Gaar Hi"	Aparichit (Dubbed version)	Harris Jayaraj	Harini	Hindi
2005	"Pookalin Desame"	Chinna	D. Imman	Harini	Tamil
2005	"Oh Ningi Jabilamma"	Kumkuma	Gantadi Krishna	Tina Kamal	Telugu
2006	"Jabiliki"	Ashok	Mani Sharma	Vardhini	Telugu
2006	"Namaha Namaha"	10th Class	Micky J Mayor	Shravani	Telugu
2006	"Sakhiya Sowkiyama"	Astram	Yuvan Shankar Raja	Shivani	Telugu
2007	"Thaaliyae Thevaiyillai"	Thaamirabharani	Yuvan Shankar Raja	Bhavatharini	Tamil
2007	"Mudhal Mazhai"	Bheema	Harris Jayaraj	Mahathi	Tamil
2007	"Paruvapu Vaana"	Bheema	Harris Jayaraj	Mahathi	Telugu
2007	"Narum Pookal"	Urchagam	Ranjit Barot	Nandini Srikar	Tamil
2007	"Nee Sa Sa Sa"	Kaadhal Valarthen	Srinivas	Shweta Mohan	Tamil
2008	"Hello Ondu Phonu"	Kempa	Gurukiran	Mahathi	Kannada
2008	"Ravi Varmana"	Budhivanta	Vijay Antony	Vinaya	Telugu
2009	"O Maha Zeeya"	Tamizh Padam	R. Kannan	Shweta Mohan	Tamil
2009	"Chinukai Varadai"	Villagelo Vinayakudu	Manikanth Kadri	Shweta Mohan	Telugu
2009	"Emantha Neram"	Tajmahal	M.M. Srilekha	Pranavi	Telugu
2009	"Yaar Paarthadhu"	Mariyadhai	Vijay Antony	Vinaya	Tamil
2009	"Kurukku Siruthavale"	Gandharva Sandhya Program	A. R. Rahman	Manjari	Tamil
2010	"Iduvarai Iduvarai"	Potta Potti	Aruldev	Mahathi	Tamil
2010	"Pal Hai Makhmaki"	Impatient Vivek	Aanamik & Neeraj	Asmita Dhuldhoye	Hindi
2010	"Srisha Srisha"	Ragada	S. Thaman	Srivardhini	Telugu
2010	"Punnagai Enna"	Murattu Kaalai	Srikanth Deva	Shraviya	Tamil
2010	"Bhor Bhagi (Bit)"	A. R. Rahman – Jai Ho Concert	A. R. Rahman	Harshdeep Kaur	Hindi
2010	"Ishq Bina (Bit)"	A. R. Rahman – Jai Ho Concert	A. R. Rahman	Harshdeep Kaur	Hindi
2010	"Dheem Dha"	A. R. Rahman – Jai Ho Concert	A. R. Rahman	Harshdeep Kaur	Hindi
2010	"Irava pagala (Unplugged)"	Yuvan Shankar Raja – Dubai Concert	Yuvan Shankar Raja	Shweta Mohan	Tamil
2011	"Ekkadi Daka"	Nagaram Nidrapothunna Vela	Yahso Krishna	Harini	Telugu
2011	"Raghupathi"	Experience The Feel Of India	Shankar Mahadevan	Harini	Hindi
2011	"Amali Thumali"	Ko	Harris Jayaraj	Shweta Mohan	Tamil
2011	"Yaaro Nee Yaaro "	Urumi (Dubbed version)	Deepak Dev	Shweta Mohan	Tamil
2011	"Atharu Peyyana"	Mohabath	S. Balakrishnan	Manjari	Malayalam
2011	"Atharu Peyyana (Remix)"	Mohabath	S. Balakrishnan	Manjari	Malayalam
2011	"Thennalin Kaikal"	Mohabath	S. Balakrishnan	Manjari	Malayalam
2011	"Vaanam Ellam"	Vellore Maavattam	Sundar C Babu	Shruthi	Tamil
2011	"Kinavinte Maranathil (Duet)"	Adaminte Makan Abu	Ramesh Narayan & Ousepachan	Madhushree Narayan	Malayalam
2011	"Ay Hairathe"	Kings In Concert	A. R. Rahman	Shweta Mohan	Hindi
2012	"Un Paarvai Podhum"	Vinmeengal	Jubin	Harini	Tamil
2012	"Sutiga Choodaku"	Ishq	Anoop Rubens & Aravindh-Shankar	Saindhavi	Telugu
2012	"Radhe Gopala"	Just In Love	Kelvin Jeyakanth	Sumitra & Subatra	Hindu
2012	"Enthaiyum Thayum"	Vandemaatharam	S. J. Jananiy	S.J. Jananiy	Tamil
2012	"Vande Matram"	Vandemaatharam	S.J. Jananiy	S.J. Jananiy	Tamil
2012	"Ramanavami"	Shirdi Sai	M.M. Keeravani	Malavika	Telugu
2012	"Balma Tose (Duet)"	Ragamorphism	Avra Banerjee	Nandini Bhattacharya	Hindi
2013	"Unnal Unnal"	Ambikapathy	A. R. Rahman	Pooja Vaidyanath	Tamil
2013	"Aaroral Manjupol"	"Single"	Satheesh Ramachandran	Archana Gopinath	Malayalam
2013	"Thanneer Vitta"	Pudhiya Bharathi	Dhina	Srisha	Tamil
2013	"Kuppai Thotti"	Rendavathu Padam	Kannan	Ujjainee	Tamil
2013	"Yaen Endral"	Idharkuthane Aasaipattai Balakumara	Siddharth Vipin	Vishnupriya & R Maalavika Manoj	Tamil
2013	"Manasula Manasula"	Alagu Magan	James Vasanthan	Pooja Vaidyanath	Tamil
2015	"Vellai Kanavondru"	Mellisai	C.S.Sam	Harini	Tamil

=== V ===
Year	Song name	Film/Album/Concert name	Music director(s)	Co-singer(s)	Language
1994	"Chinuku Thadi"	Priyaragalu	M.M. Keeravani	K. S. Chithra	Telugu
1995	"Uyire Uyire"	Bombay	A. R. Rahman	K. S. Chithra	Tamil
1995	"Vurike Chilaka"	Bombay (Dubbed version)	A. R. Rahman	K. S. Chithra	Telugu
1995	"Maname Thottaa (Duet)"	Thottachinungi	Philip & Jerry	K. S. Chithra	Tamil
1996	"Bachpan Ke Sathi Mere"	Kaalapaani	Ilaiyaraja	K. S. Chithra	Hindi
1996	"Zindagi Mein Tum Mile"	Kaalapaani	Ilaiyaraja	K. S. Chithra	Hindi
1996	"Thoda Thoda Pyar"	Priyanka (Dubbed version)	A. R. Rahman	K. S. Chithra	Hindi
1996	"Malargaley Malargaley"	Love Birds	A. R. Rahman	K. S. Chithra	Tamil
1996	"Milgaye Kilgaye"	Love Birds (Dubbed version)	A. R. Rahman	K. S. Chithra	Hindi
1996	"Manasuna Manasuga"	Love Birds (Dubbed version)	A. R. Rahman	K. S. Chithra	Telugu
1996	"Oh Dilruba"	Azhakiya Ravanan	Vidhyasagar	K. S. Chithra	Malayalam
1996	"Emain Do Emo"	Thaali	Vidhyasagar	K. S. Chithra	Telugu
1996	"Udaiyadha Vennila"	Priyam	Vidhyasagar	K. S. Chithra	Tamil
1996	"Kannukul Un Uruvame"	Unaiyeh Kalyaanam Pannikirein	Sandeep Chowtha	K. S. Chithra	Tamil
1996	"Kanulo Nee Roopame"	Ninne Pelladata	Sandeep Chowtha	K. S. Chithra	Telugu
1997	"Mera Yaara Dildara"	Kabhi Na Kabhi	A. R. Rahman	K. S. Chithra	Hindi
1997	"Indhu Maha"	Mannava	Deva	K. S. Chithra	Tamil
1997	"Nagumo Ei"	Arunachalam	Deva	K. S. Chithra	Tamil
1997	"Thuli Thuli"	Periya Manushan	Deva	K. S. Chithra	Tamil
1997	"Tu Mange Dil Main De"	Aflatoon	Dilip Sen-Sameer Sen	K. S. Chithra	Hindi
1997	"Hum Tumse Na Kuch"	Ziddi	Dilip Sen-Sameer Sen	K. S. Chithra	Hindi
1997	"Suswaa Gatham"	Suswaagatham	S. A. Rajkumar	K. S. Chithra	Telugu
1997	"Rojave Chinni (Duet)"	Suryavamsam	S. A. Rajkumar	K. S. Chithra	Telugu
1997	"Hai Hai Menaka"	Aahwanam	S.V. Krishna Reddy	K. S. Chithra	Telugu
1997	"Minsare Minsare"	Aahwanam	S.V. Krishna Reddy	K. S. Chithra	Telugu
1997	"Kadhal Solla Varthai"	Janakiraman	Sirpy	K. S. Chithra	Tamil
1997	"Minnal Oru Kodi"	V.I.P	Ranjit Barot	K. S. Chithra	Tamil
1998	"Kaalaiyil Pookum"	Kaadhale Nimmadhi	Deva	K. S. Chithra	Tamil
1998	"Unpeyar Sollavae"	Vaettiya Madichu Kattu	Deva	K. S. Chithra	Tamil
1998	"Muthan Muthalil"	Aahaa..!	Deva	K. S. Chithra	Tamil
1998	"1.2.98 ill (Duet)"	Pudhumai Pithan	Deva	K. S. Chithra	Tamil
1998	"Anbe Anbe"	Uyirodu Uyiraga	Vidhyasagar	K. S. Chithra	Tamil
1998	"Nee Kaatru"	Nilaave Vaa	Vidhyasagar	K. S. Chithra	Tamil
1998	"Mayika Yamam"	Siddhartha	Vidhyasagar	K. S. Chithra	Malayalam
1998	"Vaanum Mannum"	Kaadhal Mannan	Bharadwaj	K. S. Chithra	Tamil
1998	"Nee Pesum"	Golmaal	Bala Bharathi	K. S. Chithra	Tamil
1998	"Om Nama Nee"	Aavida Maa Aavide	Sree	K. S. Chithra	Telugu
1998	"Sollathey Solla"	Sollamaley	Bobby	K. S. Chithra	Tamil
1998	"Jili Bili Jabhili"	Manasichi Choodu	Mani Sharma	K. S. Chithra	Telugu
1999	"Intha Nimisham"	Hello	Deva	K. S. Chithra	Tamil
1999	"Malavika Malavika"	Unnai Thedi	Deva	K. S. Chithra	Tamil
1999	"En Kannaadi"	Malabar Police	S. A. Rajkumar	K. S. Chithra	Tamil
1999	"Kadalo Kadalo"	A.K.47	Hamsalekha	K. S. Chithra	Kannada
1999	"Yemani Cheppanu"	Seenu	Mani Sharma	K. S. Chithra	Telugu
2000	"Enna Solli Paaduvaen"	Vanna Thamizh Paatu	S. A. Rajkumar	K. S. Chithra	Tamil
2000	"Komma Komma"	Nuvvu Vasthavani	S. A. Rajkumar	K. S. Chithra	Telugu
2000	"Azhahu Sundari"	Budget Padbanaban	S. A. Rajkumar	K. S. Chithra	Tamil
2000	"Thodu Thodu"	Thullatha Manamum Thullum	S. A. Rajkumar	K. S. Chithra	Tamil
2000	"Vaarththai Illamal"	Suthantiram	S. A. Rajkumar	K. S. Chithra	Tamil
2000	"Kanulu Kalisayi"	Chirunavvuto	Mani Sharma	K. S. Chithra	Telugu
2000	"Sudigallilo Thadi"	Azad	Mani Sharma	K. S. Chithra	Telugu
2000	"Bharathappa Namma"	Devaramaga	Hamsalekha	K. S. Chithra	Kannada
2000	"Oho Channe Channe"	Sparsha	Hamsalekha	K. S. Chithra	Kannada
2000	"Tholivalape Theeyani"	Yuvaaraju	Ramana Gogula	K. S. Chithra	Telugu
2000	"Gudi Gantalu"	Vamshodharakudu	Koti	K. S. Chithra	Telugu
2001	"Enadaina Anukunnana"	Yeduruleni Manishi	S. A. Rajkumar	K. S. Chithra	Telugu
2001	"Manasunnadi Annadi"	Yeduruleni Manishi	S. A. Rajkumar	K. S. Chithra	Telugu
2001	"Thom Thom"	Allithantha Vaanam	Vidhyasagar	K. S. Chithra	Tamil
2001	"Sonnalthan Kathala"	Sonnal Thaan Kathala	T. Rajendar	K. S. Chithra	Tamil
2001	"Paalatho Kadigina"	Tolivalapu	Vandemataram Srinivas	K. S. Chithra	Telugu
2001	"Evarina Chosara"	Ishtam	D.G. Gopinath	K. S. Chithra	Telugu
2001	"Nuventa Istemani"	Ishtam	D.G. Gopinath	K. S. Chithra	Telugu
2001	"Dayanatha Vinayaha"	Sugghi	Hamsalekha	K. S. Chithra	Kannada
2002	"Gombe Gombe"	Sainika	Deva	K. S. Chithra	Kannada
2002	"Soldier Soldier"	Sainika	Deva	K. S. Chithra	Kannada
2002	"Kaathaliththaal ((Duet))"	Style	Bharani	K. S. Chithra	Tamil
2002	"Idena Prema"	Love U	Gurukiran	K. S. Chithra	Kannada
2002	"Olavu Shruvaythu"	Premakke Sai	Mani Sharma	K. S. Chithra	Kannada
2002	"Attarintiki"	Okkadu	Mani Sharma	Shreya Ghoshal, Priya Sisters	Telugu
2003	"Kuhu Kuhu Kogile"	Chandra Chakori	S. A. Rajkumar	K. S. Chithra	Kannada
2003	"Kuhu Kuhu Kokila"	Prema Pandiri	S. A. Rajkumar	K. S. Chithra	Telugu
2003	"Chinnaga Chinnaga"	Tagore	Mani Sharma	K. S. Chithra	Telugu
2003	"Baby Baby"	Nenu Premistunnanu	Sirpy	K. S. Chithra	Telugu
2003	"Modati Sparsa"	Rambabu Gadi Pellam	Kamalakar	K. S. Chithra	Telugu
2003	"Good Morning"	Rambabu Gadi Pellam	Kamalakar	K. S. Chithra	Telugu
2003	"Meghakke Megha"	Kiccha	Hamsalekha	K. S. Chithra	Kannada
2003	"Snehama Swapnama"	Pranam	Kamalakar	K. S. Chithra	Telugu
2003	"Thangaali Ellinda"	Heart Beats	Venkat-Narayan	K. S. Chithra	Kannada
2003	"Hrudhaya Sakhi"	Vellithira	Alphons Joseph	K. S. Chithra	Malayalam
2003	"Edho Cheppaleka"	Goa	Krishna Vasa	Shreya Ghoshal	Telugu
2003	"Subah Ke Dhoop Si"	Dhoop	Lalit Sen	Shreya Ghoshal	Hindi
2003	"Ye Dhoop Egsafar (Duet)"	Dhoop	Lalit Sen	Shreya Ghoshal	Hindi
2004	"Krishna Nuvvu Raaku"	Shiv Shankar	Ilaiyaraja	K. S. Chithra	Telugu
2004	"Rasa Rasa"	Manasthan	S. A. Rajkumar	K. S. Chithra	Tamil
2004	"Hagaluntu Suryanige"	Love Story	S. A. Rajkumar	K. S. Chithra	Kannada
2004	"Jinka Vetaki"	Adavi Ramudu	Mani Sharma	K. S. Chithra	Telugu
2004	"Yamuna Theram"	Anand	K.M. Radha Krishnan	K. S. Chithra	Telugu
2004	"Yedalo Ganam"	Anand	K.M. Radha Krishnan	K. S. Chithra	Telugu
2004	"Tumhen Arpan"	Charas	Raju Singh	K. S. Chithra	Hindi
2004	"Nilo Jargey"	Balu	Mani Sharma	Shreya Ghoshal	Telugu
2004	"Raveme Bangaru"	Abhimani	Varikuppala Yadagiri	Shreya Ghoshal	Telugu
2005	"Mann Hai Mera (Duet)"	Twinkle Twinkle Little Star	Ilaiyaraja	K. S. Chithra	Hindi
2005	"Varukirai"	Anbe Aaruyire	A. R. Rahman	K. S. Chithra	Tamil
2005	"Preethi Solode"	Hi Chinnu	Gopi Krishna	K. S. Chithra	Kannada
2005	"E Mayinaaa"	Mahanandi	Kamalakar	K. S. Chithra	Telugu
2005	"Chellu Chellu"	Nammanna	Gurukiran	K. S. Chithra	Kannada
2005	"Andala Srimathiki"	Sankranti	S. A. Rajkumar	Shreya Ghoshal	Telugu
2005	"Tananana Nananaa"	Varsha	S. A. Rajkumar	Shreya Ghoshal	Kannada
2005	"Vaasanthi Vaasanthi"	Varsha	S. A. Rajkumar	Shreya Ghoshal	Kannada
2005	"Saami Kittai"	Daas	Yuvan Shankar Raja	Shreya Ghoshal	Tamil
2005	"Dil Kahin-Tu kahan"	U, Bomsi & Me	Deepak Pandit	Shreya Ghoshal	Hindi
2005	"Khajiraho Kanavilo"	Oru Naal Oru Kanavu	Ilaiyaraja	Shreya Ghoshal	Tamil
2005	"Kaatril Varum Geethame"	Oru Naal Oru Kanavu	Ilaiyaraja	Shreya Ghoshal	Tamil
2006	"Megha Megha"	Sirivantha	S. A. Rajkumar	K. S. Chithra	Kannada
2006	"Aada Pilla"	Sainikudu	Harris Jayaraj	K. S. Chithra	Telugu
2006	"Bhadra Sheela"	Sri Ramadasu	M.M. Keeravani	K. S. Chithra	Telugu
2006	"Aalapana Na Manasuna"	Manasu Palike Mounaragam	K.M. Radha Krishnan	Shreya Ghoshal	Telugu
2006	"Preme Neramouna"	Maya Bazaar	K.M. Radha Krishnan	Shreya Ghoshal	Telugu
2006	"Solla Vaarthaikal 1–2"	Mercury Pookkal	Karthik Raja	Shreya Ghoshal	Tamil
2007	"Aankhon Ki"	Swami	Nitin Arora, Sony Chandy	K. S. Chithra	Hindi
2007	"De Jab Duaayen"	Swami	Nitin Arora, Sony Chandy	K. S. Chithra	Hindi
2007	"Risthonge Kusuboo"	Swami	Nitin Arora, Sony Chandy	K. S. Chithra	Hindi
2007	"Naa Tin Dhinna"	Swami	Nitin Arora, Sony Chandy	K. S. Chithra	Hindi
2007	"Ee Preethi Ontara"	Ee Preethi Ontara	Shameer	K. S. Chithra	Kannada
2007	"Ghazal Maina"	Malhar	Vishwajeet	K. S. Chithra	Malayalam
2008	"Nanna Kanase"	Kamannana Makallu	Vidhyasagar	K. S. Chithra	Kannada
2008	"Jiv Rangala"	Jogwa	Ajay–Atul	Shreya Ghoshal	Marathi
2009	"Enakkullae Iruppavan 1&2"	Sirithal Rasipen	Iniyavan	K. S. Chithra	Tamil
2009	"Jeeva Midiyutide "	Seena	A.T. Raveesh	K. S. Chithra	Kannada
2009	"Jiv Rangala (Flute Version)"	Jogwa	Ajay–Atul	Shreya Ghoshal	Marathi
2009	"Devadhai Desathil"	Mariyadhai	Vijay Antony	Shreya Ghoshal	Tamil
2009	"Rayilin Padhayil"	Appavi	Joshua Sridhar	Shreya Ghoshal	Tamil
2010	"Aaroo Paadum"	Katha Thudarunnu	Ilaiyaraja	K. S. Chithra	Malayalam
2010	"Poo Ondru Vendum"	Entrantrum	Vijay Karun	K. S. Chithra	Tamil
2010	"Poolu Kirhe"	Sadaa	Vijay Karun	K. S. Chithra	Hindi
2010	"Koghile Gu"	Hori	Renukumar	K. S. Chithra	Kannada
2010	"Yaaradi Nee Yaaradi"	Thambikku Indha Ooru	Dharan	Shreya Ghoshal	Tamil
2010	"Poochandi Kannazhagi"	Rattai Suzhi	Karthik Raja	Shreya Ghoshal	Tamil
2010	"Yeh Haseen Vadiyan"	A. R. Rahman – Sydney Concert	A. R. Rahman	Shweta Pandit	Hindi
2011	"Ikkuthae Kangal"	Vithagan	Joshua Sridhar	Shreya Ghoshal	Tamil
2011	"Vidhuramee Yathra"	Gadhaama	Bennet-Veetrag	Shreya Ghoshal	Malayalam
2011	"Mujhe Chod Ke (Duet)"	Dam 999	Ousephachan	Shreya Ghoshal	Hindi
2012	"Reppalapai"	Damarukam	Devi Sri Prasad	K. S. Chithra	Telugu
2012	"Vilaiyaataa (Duet)"	Dhoni	Ilaiyaraja	Shreya Ghoshal	Tamil
2012	"Engirunthu Mulaikku"	Therodum Veedhiyile	D. Imman	Shreya Ghoshal	Tamil
2013	"Kaadhal Rojave"	A. R. Rahman – Thai Manne Vanakam Concert	A. R. Rahman	K. S. Chithra	Tamil
2013	"Ennai Saithale"	Endrendrum Punnagai	Harris Jayaraj	Shreya Ghoshal	Tamil
2014	"Ye Aaine Se"	Sa re ga ma pa 2014	Hariharan	Monali Thakur	Hindi
2014	"Tum Jo Mil Gaye Ho"	Sa re ga ma pa 2014	Madan Mohan	Monali Thakur	Hindi
2015	"Vizhigalil Vizhundhavalo"	Pugazh	Vivek-Mervin	K. S. Chithra	Tamil
2016	"Ala Ala"	Loverboy	Saman	Shreya Ghoshal	Telugu
2017	"You & Me"	Khaidi No. 150	Devi Sri Prasad	Shreya Ghoshal	Telugu
2017	"Do Dilon Ke"	Viceroy's House (Dubbed version)	A. R. Rahman	Shreya Ghoshal	Hindi
2018	"Nombaram Ezhuthiya Mazhaye"	Rebuild Kerala	Ronnie Raphel	K. S. Chithra	Malayalam
2019	"Vaaney Vaaney"	Viswasam	D Imman	Shreya Ghoshal	Tamil
2022	"Nene Aa Nene"	Sita Ramam	Vishal Chandrashekhar	K. S. Chithra	Telugu
2022	"Thoodha"	Sita Ramam	Vishal Chandrashekhar	K. S. Chithra	Tamil

=== VI ===
Year	Song name	Film/Album/Concert name	Music director(s)	Co-singer(s)	Language
1983	"Hai Mubarak"	Boxer	R. D. Burman	Kavita Krishnamurthy	Hindi
1985	"Dhak Dhak Dhadke"	Ameer Aadmi Ghareeb Aadmi	R. D. Burman	Kavita Krishnamurthy	Hindi
1995	"Tu Hi Re"	Bombay (Dubbed version)	A. R. Rahman	Kavita Krishnamurthy	Hindi
1995	"Emito Emo"	Rangeli (Dubbed version)	A. R. Rahman	Kavita Krishnamurthy	Telugu
1996	"Telephone Dhun"	Hindustani (Dubbed version)	A. R. Rahman	Kavita Krishnamurthy	Hindi
1996	"Chamka Hai Teri"	Great Robbery	Raj Kote	Kavita Krishnamurthy	Hindi
1996	"Yeh Sama Yeh Sama"	Great Robbery	Raj Kote	Kavita Krishnamurthy	Hindi
1997	"Nazron-Kaliyon"	Vishwavidhaata	A. R. Rahman	Kavita Krishnamurthy	Hindi
1997	"Deewana Dil Kho Gaya"	Jab Dil Kisi Pe Aata Ha	Sandeep Chowta	Kavita Krishnamurthy	Hindi
1997	"Tera Gam Mera Gam"	Ghulam-E-Mustafa	Rajesh Roshan	Kavita Krishnamurthy	Hindi
1997	"Tera Gam (Sad)"	Ghulam-E-Mustafa	Rajesh Roshan	Kavita Krishnamurthy	Hindi
1997	"I love India"	Pardes	Nadeem-Shravan	Kavita Krishnamurthy	Hindi
1997	"Sunse Chena"	Judaai	Nadeem-Shravan	Jaspinder Narula	Hindi
1997	"Ek Main Aur Ek Tu"	Daayra	Anand–Milind	Jaspinder Narula	Hindi
1997	"Runa Laila"	Yegire Paavuramma	S. V. Krishna Reddy	Sunitha Upadrashta	Telugu
1997	"Na Kuch Diya"	Jaal Saaz	Dilip Sen-Sameer Sen	Purnima	Hindi
1997	"Ghoonghat Mein"	Ghoonghat	Anand Raj Anand		Hindi
1998	"I love India"	Sham Ghanasham	Vishal Bhardwaj	Kavita Krishnamurthy	Hindi
1998	"Wada Karke Sajan"	Barsaat Ki Raat	Laxmikant–Pyarelal	Kavita Krishnamurthy	Hindi
1998	"Meettaadha Oru"	Poonthottam	Ilaiyaraja	Mahalakshmi Iyer	Tamil
1998	"Aabadiyon Mein"	Aathwan Sur – The Other Side of Naushad	Naushad	Preeti Uttam	Hindi
1998	"Aaj Ki Baat"	Aathwan Sur – The Other Side of Naushad	Naushad	Preeti Uttam	Hindi
1998	"Peenay Waalay"	Aathwan Sur – The Other Side of Naushad	Naushad	Preeti Uttam	Hindi
1998	"Mujhko Maaf"	Aathwan Sur – The Other Side of Naushad	Naushad	Preeti Uttam	Hindi
1998	"Kadhal Nila"	Vennilave Vennilave	Adithyan	Nithyasree Mahadevan	Tamil
1999	"Jhonka Hawa Ka"	Hum Dil De Chuke Sanam	Ismail Darbar	Kavita Krishnamurthy	Hindi
1999	"Kurukku Siruthavale"	Mudhalvan	A. R. Rahman	Mahalakshmi Iyer	Tamil
1999	"Nelluri Nerajana"	Oke Okkadu (Dubbed version)	A. R. Rahman	Mahalakshmi Iyer	Telugu
1999	"ABCDEFGHI"	Hum Saath Saath Hain	Raam-Laxman	Hema Sardesai	Hindi
1999	"Happy Days"	Mother 98	Dilip Sen-Sameer Sen	Sapna Mukherjee	Hindi
2000	"Ae Dil Laya"	Kya Kehna	Rajesh Roshan & Majrooh Sultanpuri	Kavita Krishnamurthy	Hindi
2000	"Dil Ka Koyee"	Kya Kehna	Rajesh Roshan & Majrooh Sultanpuri	Kavita Krishnamurthy	Hindi
2000	"Kya Kehna"	Kya Kehna	Rajesh Roshan & Majrooh Sultanpuri	Kavita Krishnamurthy	Hindi
2000	"Ninna Kuttesinaadi"	Narasimha Naidu	Mani Sharma	Kavita Krishnamurthy	Telugu
2000	"Ae Dil Itna Bata (Duet)"	Deewane	Sanjeev-Darshan	Jaspinder Narula	Hindi
2000	"Kandu Konden"	Kandukonden Kandukonden	A. R. Rahman	Mahalakshmi Iyer	Tamil
2000	"Thongi Chuse"	Priyuralu Pilichindi (Dubbed version)	A. R. Rahman	Mahalakshmi Iyer	Telugu
2000	"Enakkoru Sinegidhi"	Priyamanavale	S. A. Rajkumar	Mahalakshmi Iyer	Tamil
2000	"Ennavo Ennavo"	Priyamanavale	S. A. Rajkumar	Mahalakshmi Iyer	Tamil
2000	"E Chota Nununna"	Ninnu Choodalani	S. A. Rajkumar	Mahalakshmi Iyer	Telugu
2000	"Kala Anuko"	Azad	Mani Sharma	Mahalakshmi Iyer	Telugu
2000	"Athini Chitini"	Thenali	A. R. Rahman	Chitra Sivaraman	Tamil
2001	"Tu Achcha Lagta Hai"	Nayak	A. R. Rahman	Kavita Krishnamurthy	Hindi
2001	"Ched Na Mujhko"	Rahul	Anu Malik	Kavita Krishnamurthy	Hindi
2001	"Kappalley Kappalley"	Chocolate	Deva	Mahalakshmi Iyer	Tamil
2001	"Malaikatru Vanthu"	Vedham	Vidhyasagar	Mahalakshmi Iyer	Tamil
2001	"Gulmuhar Malare"	Majunu	Harris Jayaraj	Anupama	Tamil
2001	"Teri Yeh Bindiya"	2011: Do Hazaar Ek	Anand Raj Anand	Preeti Uttam	Hindi
2001	"Yaadein (Duet)"	Yaadein	Anu Malik	Mahalakshmi Iyer, Sunidhi Chauhan	Hindi
2001	"Malli Kooyave"	Itlu Shravani Subramanyam	Chakri	Koushalya	Telugu
2002	"Gum Hai Kisi"	Dil Vil Pyar Vyar	R. D. Burman, Babloo Chakravorty	Kavita Krishnamurthy	Hindi
2002	"Prabhu Mere data"	Shani Vrat Ki Mahima	Ravindra Jain	Kavita Krishnamurthy	Hindi
2002	"November Madham"	Red	Deva	Mahalakshmi Iyer	Tamil
2002	"Oru Pournami"	Raja	S. A. Rajkumar	Mahalakshmi Iyer	Tamil
2002	"Ore Manam"	Villain	Vidhyasagar	Santhana Bala	Tamil
2002	"Neeli Neeli"	Aaduthu Paaduthu	Chakri	Koushalya	Telugu
2002	"Donda Pandu Lanti"	Pellam Oorelithe	Mani Sharma	Kalpana	Telugu
2002	"Ye Devi"	Amrutha (Dubbed version)	A. R. Rahman	Chinmayi	Telugu
2002	"Nanna Preethi Roja"	Roja	Hamsalekha	Divya Raghavan	Kannada
2003	"Ganga Behti Ho"	Gangajal	Bhupen Hazarika	Kavita Krishnamurthy	Hindi, Bangla
2003	"Khawabon Ke (Duet)"	Mudda – The Issue	Jeet, Pritam	Kavita Krishnamurthy	Hindi
2003	"Nit Nit Paap"	Hey Ram Hey Shyam	Hariprasad Chaurasia	Kavita Krishnamurthy	Hindi
2003	"Idu Yaavudu Yaavudu"	Vijaya Simha	Babji & Sandeep Chowta	Kavita Krishnamurthy	Kannada
2003	"Oho Priyatama"	Vijaya Simha	Babji & Sandeep Chowta	Kavita Krishnamurthy	Kannada
2003	"Hai Rama"	A. R. Rahman – Unity of Light Concert	A. R. Rahman	Mahalakshmi Iyer	Hindi
2003	"Jabilli Bugganugilli"	Khabadi Khabadi	Chakri	Koushalya	Telugu
2003	"Kinnerasani Vannela"	Veede	Chakri	Koushalya	Telugu
2003	"Mona Mona"	Sivamani	Chakri	Koushalya	Telugu
2003	"Preyasi Manohari"	Juniors	Chakri	Koushalya	Telugu
2003	"Koosind Koilaa"	Pellamtho Panenti	S.V. Krishna Reddy	Sunitha Upadrashta	Telugu
2003	"Okka Nimishamaina"	Pellamtho Panenti	S.V. Krishna Reddy	Sunitha Upadrashta	Telugu
2003	"Gadhilo Madhilo"	Premayanamaha	Ramesh Erra	Sunitha Upadrashta	Telugu
2003	"Nuvvuvunte Chaalu (Duet)"	Nenu Pelliki Ready	Chakri	Sunitha Upadrashta	Telugu
2003	"Vasiyakari"	Pudhiya Geethai	Yuvan Shankar Raja	Chitra Sivaraman	Tamil
2003	"Challa Galiki"	Dhum (Dubbed version)	Ramana Gogula	Nanditha	Telugu
2003	"Ee Reyi Tiyanidhi"	Johnny	Ramana Gogula	Nanditha	Telugu
2003	"Kadhal Kadhal"	Kadhal Dot Com	Bharadwaj	Priyadarshini	Tamil
2003	"Oru Thadavai"	Vaseegara	S. A. Rajkumar	Chinmayi	Tamil
2004	"Bhalo Bhashi Bengalili"	Omkara	Gurukiran	Kavita Krishnamurthy	Kannada
2004	"Janmabhoomi-Zindagi Hai "	Agnipankh	Pritam	Kavita Krishnamurthy	Hindi
2004	"Pisu Pisu"	Friendship	Mahesh	Mahalakshmi Iyer	Telugu
2004	"Naku Nuvvu"	Naani	A. R. Rahman	Purnima	Telugu
2004	"Chilipi Kanula"	Konchem Touchlo Vunte Cheputanu	Chakri	Koushalya	Telugu
2004	"Sarele Sarele"	Konchem Touchlo Vunte Cheputanu	Chakri	Koushalya	Telugu
2004	"Unnattuga Ennatuga"	Konchem Touchlo Vunte Cheputanu	Chakri	Koushalya	Telugu
2004	"Gunde Gundetho"	Pellam Premisthe	Chakri	Koushalya	Telugu
2004	"Maa Intiki"	Athade Oka Sainyam	S.V. Krishna Reddy	Sunitha Upadrashta	Telugu
2004	"Ottiyanam"	Arul	Harris Jayaraj	Madhumitha	Tamil
2004	"Teeyani Ee Nijam"	Kushi Kushiga	S. A. Rajkumar	Madhangi	Telugu
2004	"Ye Bandham Kalipindo"	Kaasi	Sree	Nitya Santoshini	Telugu
2005	"Band Aankhon Se"	Dus	Vishal–Shekhar	Mahalakshmi Iyer	Hindi
2005	"Neredu Pallu"	Subash Chandra Bose	Mani Sharma	Mahalakshmi Iyer	Telugu
2005	"Ajnabi Thehro Zara"	Taj Mahal: An Eternal Love Story	Naushad	Preeti Uttam	Hindi
2005	"Dilruba Dilruba"	Taj Mahal: An Eternal Love Story	Naushad	Preeti Uttam	Hindi
2005	"Mumtaz Tujhe Dekha"	Taj Mahal: An Eternal Love Story	Naushad	Preeti Uttam	Hindi
2005	"Taj Mahal"	Taj Mahal: An Eternal Love Story	Naushad	Preeti Uttam	Hindi
2005	"Chuku Buku Railu"	Jogi	Gurukiran	Sunidhi Chauhan, Bombay Jayashri	Kannada
2005	"Aankhon Mein Tum"	Umar	Shamir Tandon	Sunidhi Chauhan	Hindi
2005	"Maine Jaana"	Destiny	Hariharan, Daler Mehndi	Richa Sharma	Punjabi
2005	"Evaro Evaro"	Bhageeratha	Chakri	Koushalya	Telugu
2005	"Ku Koo"	Pandem	Chakri	Koushalya	Telugu
2005	"Kumbara Madike"	Raakshasa	Ranganath & Shashi Kumar	Nanditha	Kannada
2005	"Kathalai Yaaradi"	Thaka Thimi Tha	D. Imman	Madhangi	Tamil
2005	"Solla Mudiyala"	Kicha Vayasu 16	Dhina	Chinmayi	Tamil
2006	"Kohaye Hai"	Dil Aisa Kisi Ne Mera Toda	Triveni-Bhawani	Jaspinder Narula	Urdu
2006	"Raat Failegi To"	Dil Aisa Kisi Ne Mera Toda	Triveni-Bhawani	Jaspinder Narula	Urdu
2006	"Sanson Mein Bheegi"	Unns	Sujeet Shetty	Sunidhi Chauhan	Hindi
2006	"Sarasake Baaro"	Gandugali Kumararama	Gurukiran	Nithyasree Mahadevan	Kannada
2007	"Nuvvu Nenuga"	Pellaindi Kaani	Kamalakar	Sunitha Upadrashta	Telugu
2007	"Koi Sapna Banke"	Propose	Aadesh Shrivastava	Vijayta Pandit	Hindi
2007	"Kya Tumne Bhi"	Propose	Aadesh Shrivastava	Vijayta Pandit	Hindi
2007	"Neekai Nenu"	Don	Raghava Lawrence	Rita	Telugu
2008	"Ee Tampu Gaali"	Kaaranjji	Veer Samarth & Rajan Nagendra	Bombay Jayashri	Kannada
2008	"Punaha Punaha"	10th Class A Sec	Micky J Mayor	Vasundhara Das	Kannada
2008	"Chitti Chilakavo"	Keka	Chakri	Koushalya	Telugu
2008	"Thulasi Chediya"	Seval	G.V. Prakash Kumar	Deepa Miriam	Tamil
2009	"Hridayava Ake"	Hrudayadalli Idenidu	Dharma Prakash	Nanditha	Kannada
2009	"Ideyaa Maathu"	Devaru Kota Thangi	Hamsalekha	Nanditha	Kannada
2009	"Mumbai Antheme"	The Mumbai Antheme	Sonu Nigam	Sapna Mukherjee, Mahalakshmi Iyer	Hindi
2009	"Baachiko Baachiko"	Dubai Babu	V. Sridhar	Anuradha Bhat	Kannada
2009	"O Nene O Nuvvani"	Kalavaramaye Madilo	Sharreth	Kalpana	Telugu
2009	"Kulathil Mudhal"	Madurai Sambavam	John Peter	Chinmayi	Tamil
2009	"Chandrakala"	Adhurs	Devi Sri Prasad	Rita	Telugu
2009	"Ningiloni Chandhamama"	Bangaru Babu	M. M. Srilekha	Nitya Santoshini	Kannada
2009	"Yezhu Vannathil"	Jaggubhai	Rafee	Maheswari Rani	Tamil
2010	"Epothu Un Jenal"	Virunthali	S. S. Kumaran	Mahalakshmi Iyer	Tamil
2010	"Bangarukonda"	Simhaa	Chakri	Koushalya	Telugu
2010	"Malle Navvu"	Saradaga Kaasepu	Chakri	Koushalya	Telugu
2010	"Koorana Parvaigal"	Thoonga Nagaram	Sunder C Babu	Chinmayi	Tamil
2010	"Nee Sonnaal"	Pen Singam	Deva	Madhumitha	Tamil
2010	"Hajarea Hajarea "	Thambi Arjuna	Dhina	Rita	Tamil
2011	"Jana Gana Mana"	Jaya He		Usha Uthup	Hindi
2011	"Sajhvun Saanjh Ashi"	Aata Ga Baya	Ajay–Atul	Mahalakshmi Iyer	Marathi
2011	"Aaraam Se"	World Heart Day	Sanjeev Kapoor	Sunidhi Chauhan	Hindi
2011	"Geet Kab Sarhadein"	Sarhadein	Mayuresh Pai & Mehdi Hassan	Rekha Bhardwaj	Hindi
2011	"Enaku Oru Devathai"	Pillaiyar Theru Kadaisi Veedu	Chakri	Koushalya	Tamil
2011	"Amali Thumali"	Ko	Harris Jayaraj	Chinmayi	Tamil
2011	"Dhaare Jala Dhaare"	Lokave Helidha Maathidu	Venkat Narayan	Anuradha Bhat	Kannada
2011	"Ottha Panayaa"	Thalakonam	Jawahar & Subash	Lalitha Jawahar	Tamil
2011	"Rang Do"	Rang Do	Sushant-Shankar	Tanuja Nafde	Hindi
2011	"Yeah Ratein"	Rivaaz	Raj Inder Raj & Reeg Deb	Arpita Mukherjee	Hindi
2011	"Chirunagavu"	Christian Song	Ashirvad Luke	Gayatri	Telugu
2011	"Thiruda Thiruda"	Puli Vesham	Srikanth Deva	Vinaitha	Tamil
2011	"Raama Raama"	Coke Studio MTV – Episode 9	Lesle Lewis	Kavita Seth, Suzanne D'Mello	Hindi
2011	"Khajiraho Kanavilo"	Ilaiyaraja Nite	Ilaiyaraja	Chinmayi	Tamil
2011	"Ayangara Veetu"	Chennai Neru Stadium Concert	Harris Jayaraj	Deepa Miriam	Tamil
2011	"Bhahoon Ke Dharmiya"	Birmingham Concert	Jatin–Lalit	Ranina Reddy	Hindi
2012	"Bharat Path"	Rashtriya Gayan	Ashok Patki	Kavita Krishnamurthy	Hindi
2012	"Vennilave Tharaiyil"	Thuppakki	Harris Jayaraj	Bombay Jayashri	Tamil
2012	"Kutti Puli Kootam"	Thuppakki	Harris Jayaraj	Ranina Reddy	Tamil
2012	"Vennelave"	Thuppakki (Dubbed version)	Harris Jayaraj	Bombay Jayashri	Telugu
2012	"Chinni Chinni"	Thuppakki (Dubbed version)	Harris Jayaraj	Ranina Reddy	Telugu
2012	"Dekha Na Haye Re, All Izz Well"	IIFA Rocks	S. D. Burman, Shantanu Moitra	Usha Uthup	Hindi
2012	"Barsan Lagi"	Qutub Festival	Ghulam Ali		Hindi
2012	"Adikkadi Mudi"	Ponmalai Pozhuthu	Sathya C	Priya Hemesh	Tamil
2012	"Maahi"	Maahi	Hariharan	Lavanya	Hindi
2013	"Azhagu Malar Aada"	Ilaiyaraja – Toronto Concert	Ilaiyaraja	Surmukhi Raman	Tamil
2013	"The Blue Soul"	Indian Chill Harmonics	Raajesh Johri	Lalitya Munshaw	Hindi
2013	"Ye Kaisi Uljhan Hai"	Chehra The Unknown Mask	Deepak K Bajaj		Hindi
2013	"Raakozhi Raakozhi"	Irandam Ulagam	Harris Jayaraj	Megha	Tamil
2013	"Raakasi Raakasi"	Varna (Dubbed version)	Harris Jayaraj	Megha	Telugu
2013	"Satrangi Jaadugar"	100 Years of Indian Cinema	Shantanu Moitra	Sunidhi Chauhan, Kavita Krishnamurthy	Hindi
2014	"Sarigamale Sarigamale"	Veta	Chakri	Koushalya	Telugu
2014	"Thodu vanam"	Anegan	Harris Jayaraj	Shakthisree Gopalan	Tamil
2015	"Thaalam Puthu Mazha"	Kaattumaakkaan	Murali Guruvayoor	Rimi Tomy	Malayalam

== Hindi songs ==
Year	Film	Song	Composer(s)	Lyricist(s)	Co-singer(s)
1978	Gaman	"Ajeeb Saneha"	Jaidev	Shahryar	—N/a
1980	Aayi Teri Yaad	"Ye Khwab Sa Dekha Tha"	Jaidev	Naqsh Lyallpuri	—N/a
1980	Chemmeen Lahren	"Lahar Lahar Dole Re"	Salil Chowdhury	Yogesh	—N/a
1980	Chemmeen Lahren	"Pyasa Hai Man Kya Karoon"	Salil Chowdhury	Yogesh	—N/a
1980	Chemmeen Lahren	"Sun Mitwa Re"	Salil Chowdhury	Yogesh	Suresh Wadkar, Antara Chowdhury, Sabita Chowdhury
1981	Chashme Buddoor	"Pyar Lagaawat Pranay Mohabbat"	Raj Kamal	Indu Jain	Shailendra Singh, Anand Kumar C.
1981	Shama	"Pareshaan Haal Hoon"	Usha Khanna	Zafar Gorakhpuri	Anwar
1982	Aagaman	"Ab Toot Girengi"	Ustad Ghulam Mustafa Kham	Faiz Ahmad Faiz	—N/a
1982	Aagaman	"An Toot Girengi"(Version ll)	Ustad Ghulam Mustafa Kham	Faiz Ahmad Faiz	Ustad Ghulam Mustafa Kham
1982	Aagaman	"Junoon Ki Yaad"	Ustad Ghulam Mustafa Kham	Faiz Ahmad Faiz	—N/a
1982	Bekhabad	"Haan Magal Murat"	Usha Khanna		
1982	Dard Ka Rishta	"Ganapathi Bappa Moraya"	R. D. Burman		
1982	Ramnagari	"Main To Kab Se Teri"	Jaidev		
1982	Ramnagari	"Aa Baith Ja"	Jaidev		
1982	Ramnagari	"Man Ke Darpan Men"	Jaidev		
1982	Ramnagari	"Raaton Ko Maange Hai"	Jaidev		
1982	Teesri Aankh	"Om Namah Shivaya"	Laxmikant–Pyarelal		
1983	Katha	"Kaun Aaya"	Raj Kamal		
1983	Katha	"Kya Hua"	Raj Kamal		
1983	Mazdoor	"Nana Ho Gaya Diwana"	R. D. Burman		
1984	Boxer	"Hai Mubarak Aaj Ka Din"	R. D. Burman		Kavita Krishnamurthy
1984	Mashaal	"Footpaathon Ke Ham"	Hridaynath Mangeshkar		
1985	Yaar Kasam	"Rang Ras Bharse"	Usha Khanna		
1985	Zamana	"Taal Betaal Saara Jeevan"	Usha Khanna		
1986	Amma	"Tumhe Kasam Hai"	Raj Kamal		
1987	Sindoor	"Jhat Pat Ghunghat Khol"	Laxmikant–Pyarelal		
1988	Zalzala	"Mar Jayenge Hum"	R. D. Burman		
1989	Abhi To Main Jawan Hoon	" Main To Aarti Utaaroon Re"	Anand–Milind	Sameer	—N/a
1989	Bade Ghar Ki Beti	"Samdhi Teri Godhi"	Laxmikant–Pyarelal	Hasan Kamal	Alka Yagnik, Mohammed Aziz
1991	Lamhe	"Yeh Lamhe Yeh Pal"	Shiv-Hari	Anand Bakshi	—N/a
1991	Lamhe	"Yeh Lahme"(Sad)	Shiv-Hari	Anand Bakshi	—N/a
1991	Lamhe	"Kabhi Main Kahoon"	Shiv-Hari	Anand Bakshi	Lata Mangeshkar
1991	Pyar Hua Chori Chori	"Aayo Re Aayo Nandlal"	Laxmikant–Pyarelal	Anand Bakshi	Suresh Wadkar
1991	Pyar Ka Sawan	"O Sureele Saazon"	Ravindra Jain		—N/a
1992	Jeena Marna Tere Sang	"Dil Mein Hai Kya"	Lalit Sen	Mahendra Dehlvi	Anuradha Paudwal
1992	Roja	"Roja Jaaneman" (version - 2)	A. R. Rahman	P. K. Mishra	Sujatha Mohan
1992	Roja	"Bharat Hum Ko"	A. R. Rahman	P. K. Mishra	—N/a
1992	Shiv Mahima	"Chal Kanwariya Chal Kanwariya"	Arun Paudwal	Sachidananda Mishra	—N/a
1992	Shiv Mahima	"Hey Bhole Shankar Padharo"	Arun Paudwal	Balbir Nirdosh	—N/a
1992	Shiv Mahima	"Hey Shambhu Baba"	Arun Paudwal	Shyam Raj	—N/a
1992	Shiv Mahima	"Prabhu Mere Man Ko"	Arun Paudwal	Mahendra Dehlvi	—N/a
1992	Shiv Mahima	"Shiv Shankar Beda Paar Karo"	Arun Paudwal	Mahendra Dehlvi	—N/a
1992	Shiv Mahima	"Subah Subah Le Shiv Ka Naam"	Arun Paudwal	Nand Lal Pathak	—N/a
1992	Shiv Mahima	"Bum Bhole Kailashnath"	Arun Paudwal	traditional	—N/a
1992	Shiv Mahima	"Jyotirlingo Ka Dhyan Karo"	Arun Paudwal	Nand Lal Pathak	Anuradha Paudwal
1993	Darr	"Likha Hai Ye In Hawaaon Pe"	Shiv-Hari	Anand Bakshi	Lata Mangeshkar
1993	In Custody	"Aaj Bazaar Mein"	Zakir Hussain & Ustad Sultan Khan	Faiz Ahmad Faiz	—N/a
1993	Meherbaan	"Aao Guru Karen Peena Shuru"	Dilip Sen - Sameer Sen	Mahendra Dehlvi	Sudesh Bhonsle
1993	Sahibaan	"Bansuri Yeh Bansuri"	Shiv-Hari	Anand Bakshi	—N/a
1993	Teri Payal Mere Geet	"Chhoone Nahin Doongi"	Naushad	Hasan Kamal	—N/a
1994	Great Robbery	"Yeh Sama Yeh Sama"	Raj–Koti		
1994	Great Robbery	"Chamka Hai Teri"	Raj–Koti		
1994	Humse Hai Muqabala	"Sun Ri Sakhi"	A. R. Rahman	P. K. Mishra	
1994	Ikke Pe Ikka	"Tere Khayal Mein"	Mahesh Kishore		
1994	Khel Khiladi Ka	"Pakka Dilbar Jaani"	A. R. Rahman		
1994	Mohabbat Ki Arzoo	"Chand Sitaron Mein"	Laxmikant–Pyarelal		
1995	Bombay	"Tu Hi Re"	A. R. Rahman		
1995	Haqeeqat	"Dil Ne Dil Se Ikrar Kiya"	Dilip Sen - Sameer Sen		
1995	Muthu Maharaja	"Chhod Chala Nirmohi"	A. R. Rahman		
1995	Priyanka	"Khili Chandni Hame"	A. R. Rahman		
1995	Priyanka	"Thoda Thoda Pyar"(Version ll)	A. R. Rahman		
1995	Rangeela	"Hai Rama"	A. R. Rahman		
1995	Velu Nayakan	"Sitam Ki Andhi Se"	Ilaiyaraaja		
1996	Chal Kaanwariya Shiv Ke Dham	"Ganga Ki Har Mauj Mein"	Surinder Kohli	Balbir Nirdosh	—N/a
1996	Duniya Dilwalon Ki	"College Ke Saathi"	A. R. Rahman		KK, Aslam Mustafa
1996	Hindustani	"Telephone Dhoon Me"	A. R. Rahman		
1996	Jab Dil Kisi Pe Aata Hai	"Deewana Dil Kho Gaya"	Sandeep Chowta		
1996	Jab Dil Kisi Pe Aata Hai	"Jawani Kyun"	Sandeep Chowta		
1996	Khamoshi: The Musical	"Bahon Ke Darmiyan"	Jatin–Lalit		
1996	Love Birds	"Milgaye Milgaye"	A. R. Rahman		
1996	Maachis	"Chhod Aaye Hum"	Vishal Bhardwaj		
1996	Maachis	"Tum Gaye"(Male)	Vishal Bhardwaj		
1996	Maachis	"Chappa Chappa"	Vishal Bhardwaj		
1996	Mr. Romeo	"Romeo Teri Kismat"	A. R. Rahman		
1996	Saza-E-Kalapani	"Zindagi Mein Tum"	Ilaiyaraaja		
1996	Saza-E-Kalapani	"Bachpan Ke Saathi"	Ilaiyaraaja		
1996	Tere Mere Sapne	"Kuch Mere Dilne Kaha"	Viju Shah		
1997	Aahaa	"Bhaaga Sa"	Deva		
1997	Aahaa	"Gare Dore"	Deva		
1997	Aflatoon	"Tu Mange Dil Main"	Dilip Sen - Sameer Sen		
1997	Betaabi	"Hay Hay"	Vishal Bhardwaj		
1997	Border	"Mere Dushman Mere Bhai"	Anu Malik		
1997	Chachi 420	"Gare Dore"	Vishal Bhardwaj		
1997	Chachi 420	"Daudaa Daudaa"	Vishal Bhardwaj		
1997	Dil To Pagal Hai	"Ek Duje Ke Vaaste"	Uttam Singh		
1997	Ghulam-E-Mustafa	"Tera Ghum Mera Ghum"	Rajesh Roshan		
1997	Ghulam-E-Mustafa	"Tera Ghum Mera Ghum"(Sad)	Rajesh Roshan		
1997	Ghoonghat	"Ghoonghat Mein Chehra"	Anand Raaj Anand		
1997	Gundagardi	"Saila Saila"	Jatin–Lalit		
1997	Itihaas	"Dil Ke Qalam Se"	Dilip Sen - Sameer Sen		
1997	Jaal Saaz	"Na Kuchh Diya"	Dilip Sen - Sameer Sen		
1997	Judaai	"Judaai Judaai"	Nadeem–Shravan		
1997	Mrityudand	"Raat Maheke To Yun Bhi"	Anand–Milind		
1997	Pardes	"I Love My India"	Nadeem–Shravan	Anand Bakshi	Kavita Krishnamurthy, Aditya Narayan & Shankar Mahadevan
1997	Sapnay	"Chanda Re"(Version l)	A. R. Rahman		
1997	Sapnay	"Chanda Re"(Version ll)	A. R. Rahman		
1997	Tirupati Shree Balaji	"Dekha Hai Ik Sapna"	M. M. Kreem		
1997	Tirupati Shree Balaji	"Venkesh Sun Lo"	M. M. Kreem		
1997	Virasat	"Ek Tha Raja"	Anu Malik		
1997	Vishwavidhaata	"Kal Nahi Tha Woh"(Sad)	A. R. Rahman		
1997	Vishwavidhaata	"Kaliyon Se Palkhen Hain"	A. R. Rahman		
1997	Ziddi	"Hum Tumse"(Duet)	Dilip Sen - Sameer Sen		
1997	Ziddi	"Hum Tumse"(Solo)	Dilip Sen - Sameer Sen		
1998	2001: Do Hazaar Ek	"Teri Yeh Bindiya"	Anand Raaj Anand		
1998	Achanak	"Na Koi Awaaz De Humko"	Dilip Sen - Sameer Sen		
1998	Achanak	"Oonchi Oonchi Deewaron Mein"	Dilip Sen - Sameer Sen		
1998	Angaaray	"Le Chalo Tum Jahan"	Sukhwinder Singh		
1998	Angaaray	"Tum Hi Mere Humsashin"	Raju Singh		
1998	China Gate	"Hum Ko To Rahna Hai"	Anu Malik		
1998	Earth	"Dheemi Dheemi"	A. R. Rahman		
1998	Jeans	"Ajooba"	A. R. Rahman		
1998	Jeans	"Tauba Tauba"	A. R. Rahman		
1998	Kabhi Na Kabhi	"Mere Yaar Dildara"	A. R. Rahman		
1998	Kabhi Na Kabhi	"Tum Ho Meri Nigahon Mein"	A. R. Rahman		
1998	Prem Aggan	"Tere Pyar Ki Aag Mein"	Anu Malik		
1998	Prem Aggan	"Har Dam Dam Bedam"	Anu Malik		
1998	Prem Aggan	"Har Dam Dam Bedam"(Duet)	Anu Malik		
1998	Satya	"Tu Mere Paas Bhi Hai"	Vishal Bhardwaj		
1998	Sham Ghansham	"Maa Ki Mamta Pe Hum Honge Kurban"	Vishal Bhardwaj		
1998	Sham Ghansham	"Oh No Gussa Chodo"	Vishal Bhardwaj		
1998	Sham Ghansham	"Tum Dono Ho Ek Se Alag Ho Kaise Nam"	Vishal Bhardwaj		
1999	Arjun Pandit	"O Priya"	Dilip Sen - Sameer Sen		Alka Yagnik
1999	Bade Dilwala	"Jawan Jawan Hai"	Aadesh Shrivastava		
1999	Dahek	"Sawan Barse Tarse Dil"	Aadesh Shrivastava		
1999	Dil Hi Dil Mein	"Roja Roja"	A. R. Rahman	Mehboob Kotwal	
1999	Hu Tu Tu	"Itna Lamba Kash Lo Yaaro"	Vishal Bhardwaj		
1999	Hu Tu Tu	"Chhai Chhap Chhai"	Vishal Bhardwaj		
1999	Hum Dil De Chuke Sanam	"Jhonka Hawa Ka"	Ismail Darbar	Mehboob Kotwal	Kavita Krishnamurthy
1999	Hum Saath-Saath Hain	"Hum Saath Saath Hain"	Raamlaxman		
1999	Hum Saath-Saath Hain	"Yeh To Sach Hai Ki Bhagwan Hai"	Raamlaxman		
1999	Hum Saath-Saath Hain	"A B C D"	Raamlaxman		
1999	Hum Saath-Saath Hain	"Mhare Hiwda"	Raamlaxman		
1999	Hum Tum Pe Marte Hain	"O Mere Daddy"	Uttam Singh		
1999	Hum Tum Pe Marte Hain	"O Mere Bitwa"	Uttam Singh		
1999	Jahan Tum Le Chalo	"Atthanisi Zindagi"	Vishal Bhardwaj		
1999	Jahan Tum Le Chalo	"Kabhi Chaand Ki Tarah"	Vishal Bhardwaj		
1999	Kohram	"Palakon Ko Kalam Banaa Ke"	Dilip Sen - Sameer Sen		
1999	Love You Hamesha	"Gup Chup Baatein"	A. R. Rahman		
1999	Mother	Happy Days Are Here Again"	Dilip Sen - Sameer Sen		
1999	Sirf Tum	"Sirf Tum"	Nadeem–Shravan		
1999	Taal	"Nahin Samne"	A. R. Rahman		
1999	Vaalee	"Oh Sona Oh Sona"	Deva		
2000	Bichhoo	"Tere Hothon Ki Hansi"	Anand Raaj Anand		
2000	Deewane	"Ae Dil"	Sanjeev–Darshan		
2000	Dil Pe Mat Le Yaar	"Swagatham"	Vishal Bhardwaj		
2000	Gang	"Ye Karo Ye Nahin"	Anu Malik		
2000	Gang	"Aaj Tu Maang Le"	Anu Malik		
2000	Ghaath	"Hum Bhi Samajh"	Anu Malik		
2000	Hera Pheri	"Denewala Jab Bhi"	Anu Malik		
2000	Hera Pheri	"Humba Leela"	Anu Malik		
2000	Hey Ram	"Janmon Ki Jwala"	Ilaiyaraaja		
2000	Hey Ram	"Chahe Pandit Ho"	Ilaiyaraaja		
2000	Jung	"Yadaa Yadaa Hi"	Anu Malik		
2000	Kya Kehna	"Dil Ka Koi Tukda"	Rajesh Roshan		
2000	Kya Kehna	"Kya Kehna"	Rajesh Roshan		
2000	Mela	"Dekho 2000 Zamana"	Lesle Lewis		
2001	Aks	"Hum Bhool"(Male)	Anu Malik		
2001	Albela	"Dil Harama Hua Hai"	Jatin–Lalit		
2001	Chhupa Rustam: A Musical Thriller	"Tu Hai Mera Dil Mein"	Anand–Milind		
2001	Grahan	"Yeh Sochta Hai Kya"	Karthik Raja		
2001	Nayak	"Tu Accha Lagta Hain"	A. R. Rahman		
2001	Pyaar Ishq Aur Mohabbat	"Tum Lakh Chupe Ho"	Viju Shah		
2001	Rahul	"Ched Na Mujhko"	Anu Malik		
2001	Tere Liye	"Tanha Hoon Yaara"	Jeet - Pritam		
2001	Tera Mera Saath Rahen	"Main Sochon"	Anand Raaj Anand		
2001	Yaadein	"Yaadein"(Male)	Anu Malik		
2001	Yaadein	"Kuch Saal Pehle"	Anu Malik		
2001	Yeh Zindagi Ka Safar	"Zamane Mein Sabhie"	Daboo Malik		
2002	Dil Vil Pyar Vyar	"Gum Hai Kisi Ke"	Babloo Chakravarthy		
2002	Dil Vil Pyar Vyar	"O Hansini"	Babloo Chakravarthy		
2002	Dil Vil Pyar Vyar	"Tere Bina Zindagi Se"	Babloo Chakravarthy		
2002	Dil Vil Pyar Vyar	"Tum Bin Jaaon Kahan"	Babloo Chakravarthy		
2002	Dil Vil Pyar Vyar	"Yeh Jo Mohabbatein Hai"	Babloo Chakravarthy		
2002	Durga	"Hum Aur Tum"	Vidyasagar		
2002	Indra The Tiger	"Yeh Haseen Chehra"	Mani Sharma		
2002	Kuch Tum Kaho Kuch Hum Kahein	"Kuch Tum Kaho Kuch"	Anu Malik		
2002	Mitr, My Friend	"Ehsaas"	Bhavatharini		
2002	Om Jai Jagadish	"Om Jai Jagadish"	Anu Malik		
2002	Pyaar Diwana Hota Hai	"Deewane Dil"	Uttam Singh		
2002	Pyar Ki Dhun	"Gum Sum Si Ho"	Shantanu Moitra		
2002	Pyar Ki Dhun	"Ummeedein Dil Mein"	Shantanu Moitra		
2002	Shararat	"Ye Main Kahan"	Sajid–Wajid		
2002	Shararat	"Mastana Albela"	Sajid–Wajid		
2002	The Legend of Bhagat Singh	"Sarfaroshi Ki Tamanna"(Sad)	A. R. Rahman		
2003	Dhoop	"Ye Dhoop Ek Safar"(Male)	Lalit Sen		
2003	Dhoop	"Subah Ke Dhoop Si"	Lalit Sen		
2003	Ek Alag Mausam	"Uski Baari Jo Thi"	Ravi		
2003	Ek Alag Mausam	"Usko Paane Se Pehle"(Male)	Ravi		
2003	LOC: Kargil	"Main Kahin Bhi Rahoon"	Anu Malik		
2003	Paanch	"Paka Mat"	Vishal Bhardwaj		
2003	The Hero: Love Story of a Spy	"Tum Bhi Na Mano"	Uttam Singh		
2004	Agnipankh	"Zindagi Hai To Maut"	Pritam		
2004	Banana Brothers	"Banana Brothers"	Jaidev Kumar		
2004	Charas	"Tumhen Arpan"	Raju Singh		
2004	Dobara	"Tum Abhi"(Male)	Anu Malik		
2004	Hulchul	"Lee Humne Thi Kasam"	Vidyasagar	Sameer	
2004	Lakeer – Forbidden Lines	"Sadiyaan"	A. R. Rahman		
2004	Lakshya	"Kitni Baatein"	Shankar–Ehsaan–Loy		
2004	Lakshya	"Kandhon Se Milte"	Shankar–Ehsaan–Loy		
2004	Lakshya	"Kitni Baatein"(Reprise)	Shankar–Ehsaan–Loy		
2004	Raincoat	"Piya Tora Kaisa Abhiman"(Male)	Debajyoti Mishra		
2004	Swades	"Yun Hi Chala Chala"	A. R. Rahman		
2005	Aparichit	"Iyengaru Ghar Ki"	Harris Jayaraj		
2005	Chand Bujh Gaya	"Yaad Aye Woh Din"	Kanak Raj		
2005	Chandramukhi	"Ruko Thoda"	Vidyasagar		
2005	Dus	"Jaaniya Ve"	Vishal–Shekhar		
2005	Kisna: The Warrior Poet	"Chilman Uthegi Nahin"	Ismail Darbar		
2005	Paheli	"Khaali Hai"	M. M. Kreem		
2005	Taj Mahal: An Eternal Love Story	"Apni Zulfein Mere"	Naushad		
2005	Taj Mahal: An Eternal Love Story	"Dilruba"	Naushad		
2005	Taj Mahal: An Eternal Love Story	"Mumtaz Tujhe Dekha"	Naushad		
2005	Taj Mahal: An Eternal Love Story	"Taj Mahal"	Naushad		
2005	Taj Mahal: An Eternal Love Story	"Taj Mahal"(Crescendo)	Naushad		
2005	U, Bomsi n Me	"Dil Kahin Tu Kahan"	Deepak Pandit		
2006	Chingaari	"Dulhan Dulhan"	Aadesh Shrivastava		
2006	Sri Ram Mandir	"Jaadu Jaadu"	M. M. Kreem		
2006	Sri Ram Mandir	"Hylessaa"	M. M. Kreem		
2006	Sri Ram Mandir	"Charanome Ho Sannidhi"	M. M. Kreem		
2006	Sri Ram Mandir	"Badrasaila Raj Mandir"	M. M. Kreem		
2007	Bal Ganesh	"Aao Sunaata Hoon Sabko"	Shamir Tondon		
2007	Guru	"Ey Hairathe"	A. R. Rahman		
2007	Sivaji: The Boss	"Wahji Wahji"	A. R. Rahman		
2007	Swami	"Swami"	Nitin Arora - Sony Chandy		
2007	Swami	"Naa Tin Dhinna"	Nitin Arora - Sony Chandy		
2007	Swami	"De Jab Duaayen"	Nitin Arora - Sony Chandy		
2007	Swami	"Aankhon Ki"	Nitin Arora - Sony Chandy		
2007	Swami	"Radhe"	Nitin Arora - Sony Chandy		
2007	Traffic Signal	"Yeh Zindagi Hai"	Shamir Tondon		
2008	Bhoothnath	"Samay Ka Pahiya"	Vishal–Shekhar		
2008	Dashavtar	"Om Namo Narayan"	Himesh Reshammiya		
2008	Mukhbiir	"Dhoonde Dil"	Shashi Preetam		
2009	Aseema	"Aasuon Ka Pehra"	Shamir Tandon		
2009	Aseema	"Ek Safar Hai Zindagi"	Shamir Tandon		
2009	Aseema	"Jeene Ki Nayi Aasha"	Shamir Tandon		
2009	Aseema	"Tere Aane Se Pehle"	Shamir Tandon		
2009	Aseema	"Yoon Na Jao"	Shamir Tandon		
2009	Chal Chalein	"Tum Bhi Dhoondna"	Ilaiyaraaja		
2009	Chal Chalein	"Gup Chup Shaam"	Ilaiyaraaja		
2009	Maruti Mera Dost	"Jai Hanuman"	Karthik Shah		
2009	Road to Sangam	"Lab Pe Aati Hai Dua"	Nitin Kumar Gupta		
2009	Ruslaan	"Pyar Ki Parsayee"	Raeess Jaman Khan		
2010	Robot	"Arima Arima"	A. R. Rahman		
2011	Dam 999	"Mujhe Chodke"	Ouseppachan		
2011	Impatient Vivek	"Pal Hai Makhmali"	Shahdaab Barthiya		
2011	Kashmakash	"Khoya Kya"	Sanjoy - Raja		
2011	Kashmakash	"Nau Meri"	Sanjoy - Raja		
2011	Mummy Punjabi	"Hum Tum Akele Reh Gaye"	Aadesh Shrivastava	Sameer	
2012	Chhodo Kal Ki Baatein	"Dil Darpan"	Saleel Kulkarni		Shankar Mahadevan
2012	Phaans	"Yeh Ghadi Hai Kaisi"	Dilip Sen		
2013	Chehra	"Ye Kaisi Uljhan Hai"	Deepak K Bajaj		
2015	Black Home	"Sakhi Re Kahe"	Akshay Hariharan		
2015	Black Home	"Bhagi"(Version ll)	Akshay Hariharan		
2015	Eik Dastak	"Gumsum Hai"	Sanjoy Chowdhury		
2016	Ardhangini Ek Ardhsatya	"Jaane Ye Kya Hua"	Dinesh Arjuna		
2016	Nil Battey Sannata	"Maa"	Rohan & Vinayak		
2017	Partition: 1947	"Do Dilon Ki"	A. R. Rahman		
2020	Kaamyaab	"Sikandar"	Rachita Arora	Neeraj Pandey	
2021	Ye Mard Bechara	"Tum Sang"	Anup Thapa		
2021	Mera Fauji Calling	"Aa Zindagi Tujhe"	Vijay Verma		
2022	Dhaakad	"So Ja Re"	Dhruv Ghanekar		Sunidhi Chauhan
2023	Bholaa	"Aaraaro Aararo"	Ravi Basrur	Irshad Kamil	
2023	Samara	"Kiska Intezaar Hai"	Deepak Warrier	Mohammad Faheem	Gaytri Asokan
2023	Tejas	"Reh Jao Na"	Shashwat Sachdev		
2023	Pyaar Hai Toh Hai	"Mann Ka Mayura"	Anique	Dheeraj Kumar	Pratibha Singh Baghel
2025	Emergency	"Ae Meri Jaan"	Arko	Manoj Muntashir	

== Tamil songs ==
Year	Film	Song	Composer(s)	Co-artist(s)
1992	Roja	"Thamizha"	A. R. Rahman	
1992	Annan Ennada Thambi Ennada	"Asai Mella"	Gyan Varma	
1995	Bombay	"Uyire Uyire"	A. R. Rahman	K. S. Chithra
1995	Bombay	"Kuchi Kuchi"	A. R. Rahman	Swarnalatha, G. V. Prakash Kumar
1995	Indira	"Nila Kaikiradhu"(Male)	A. R. Rahman	
1995	Aasai	"Konja Naal Poru"	Deva	Sujatha Mohan
1995	Rangeela	"Ai Rama"	A. R. Rahman	Swarnalatha
1995	Muthu	"Vidukathaiya"	A. R. Rahman	
1996	Coimbatore Mappillai	"Oru Theithi Parthaal"	Vidhyasagar	Sadhana Sargam
1996	Love Birds	"Malargaley"	A. R. Rahman	K. S. Chithra
1996	Musthaffaa	"Kannukkum Kannukkum"	Vidyasagar	Sadhana Sargam
1996	Kalloori Vaasal	"En Manathai"	Deva	
1996	Indian	"Telephone Manipol"	A. R. Rahman	Harini
1996	Priyam	"Udaiyatha Vennila"	Vidyasagar	K. S. Chithra
1996	Kadhal Desam	"Kalluri Salai"	A. R. Rahman	A. R. Rahman, Aslam Mustafa
1996	Unnaiye Kalyanam Pannikiren	"Kannukkul Un"	Sandeep Chowta	K. S. Chithra
1996	Unnaiye Kalyanam Pannikiren	"Innum Yedho"	Sandeep Chowta	
1996	Avvai Shanmughi	"Kadhala Kadhala"	Deva	Sujatha Mohan
1996	Avvai Shanmughi	"Kadhali Kadhali"	Deva	
1996	Mr. Romeo	"Romeo Aatam Potal"	A. R. Rahman	Udit Narayan
1996	Panchalankurichi	"Un Uthattora"	Deva	Anuradha Sriram
1997	Iruvar	"Kannai Kattikolathey"	A. R. Rahman	
1997	Minsara Kanavu	"Vennilavae"	A. R. Rahman	Sadhana Sargam
1997	Periya Thambi	"Taj Mahale"	Deva	
1997	Pudhayal	"Poothirukkum Vaname"	Vidyasagar	Uma Ramanan
1997	Kaalamellam Kadhal Vaazhga	"Oru Mani Adithal"	Deva	
1997	Mannava	"Indhu Maha Samudrame"	Deva	
1997	Mannava	"Pa Pa Chinna Pappa"	Deva	
1997	Mannava	"Un Manathai"	Deva	
1997	Aravindhan	"All The Best"	Yuvan Shankar Raja	
1997	Arunachalam	"Nagumo"	Deva	
1997	Raasi	"Poomalai"	Sirpy	
1997	Sishya	"Yaro Azhaithadhu"	Deva	Uma Ramanan
1997	Sishya	"Thigu Thigura"	Deva	
1997	Ullaasam	"Konjum Manjal"	Karthik Raja	
1997	Suryavamsam	"Rosappu Chinna Rosappu" (Male)	S. A. Rajkumar	
1997	Suryavamsam	"Kadhala Kadhala"	S. A. Rajkumar	Swarnalatha
1997	V. I. P.	"Minnal Oru Kodi"	Ranjit Barot	K. S. Chithra
1997	Periya Idathu Mappillai	"Kanne Pasam"	Sirpy	
1997	Nerrukku Ner	"Engengey"	Deva	Asha Bhosle
1997	Nerrukku Ner	"Aval Varuvala"	Deva	
1997	Aahaa Enna Porutham	"Sinthamani Sinthamani"	Vidyasagar	S. Janaki
1997	Aahaa	"Hip Hip Hurry"	Deva	
1997	Aahaa	"Mudhan Mudhalil"(Duet)	Deva	K. S. Chithra
1997	Aahaa	"Mudhan Mudhalil"(Solo)	Deva	
1997	Periya Manushan	"Hollywood Mudhal"	Deva	
1997	Ratchagan	"Chandiranai Thottathu Yaar"	A. R. Rahman	Sujatha Mohan
1997	Thedinen Vanthathu	"Aalps Malaikkaattru"	Sirpy	
1997	Janakiraman	"Hey Cha Cha Kadalicha"	Sirpy	
1997	Janakiraman	"Kadal Solla Varthai"	Sirpy	
1997	Poochudava	"Nee Illai"	Sirpy	
1997	Poochudava	"Vaaliba Vayasukku"	Sirpy	
1997	Rettai Jadai Vayasu	"Kanchipattu Chellakatti"	Deva	
1997	Kadhalukku Mariyadhai	"Ennai Thaalaata"	Ilaiyaraaja	
1998	Moovendhar	"Kumudam Pol"	Sirpy	
1998	Moovendhar	"Naan Vaanavillaiye"	Sirpy	
1998	Kaadhale Nimmadhi	"Kaalaiyil"	Deva	
1998	Maru Malarchi	"Nandri Solla Unakku"	S. A. Rajkumar	
1998	Naam Iruvar Namakku Iruvar	"Intha Siru Pennai"	Karthik Raja	
1998	Naam Iruvar Namakku Iruvar	"Kattaana Ponnu"	Karthik Raja	Sadhana Sargam
1998	Velai	"Oyvedu Nilave"	Yuvan Shankar Raja	
1998	Kaadhal Mannan	"Vaannum Mannum"	Bharadwaj	
1998	Vaettiya Madichu Kattu	"Un Peyar"	Deva	
1998	Ninaithen Vandhai	"Vannanilavae"	Deva	
1998	Kaathala Kaathala	"Laila Laila"	Karthik Raja	
1998	Kaathala Kaathala	"Madonna Paadala"(Version ll)	Karthik Raja	
1998	Jeans	"Anbe Anbe"	A. R. Rahman	Anuradha Sriram
1998	Jeans	"Punnagayil Thee Mooti"	A. R. Rahman	
1998	Aval Varuvala	"Ooh Vandhadhu"	S. A. Rajkumar	
1998	Iniyavale	"Uyire Uyire"	Deva	
1998	Golmaal	"Nee Pesum"	Bala Bharathi	
1998	Priyamudan	"Aakasavani"	Deva	
1998	Sandhippoma	"Gnabagam Irukriadha"	Deva	
1998	Sandhippoma	"Radha Radha"	Deva	
1998	Poonthottam	"Vennilavukku Aasai Pattein"	Ilaiyaraaja	
1998	Poonthottam	"Meethaatha Oru Veenai"	Ilaiyaraaja	
1998	Sollamale	"Sollathae"(Duet)	Bobby	
1998	Sollamale	"Sollathae"(Solo)	Bobby	
1998	Nilaave Vaa	"Nee Kaatru"(Duet)	Vidyasagar	K. S. Chithra
1998	Nilaave Vaa	"Nee Kaatru"(Solo)	Vidyasagar	
1998	Unnidathil Ennai Koduthen	"Edho Oru"(Male)	S. A. Rajkumar	
1998	Unnidathil Ennai Koduthen	"Thottabedda"	S. A. Rajkumar	
1998	Uyire	"Thaiyya Thaiyya"	A. R. Rahman	
1998	Kannedhirey Thondrinal	"Chinna Chinna Kiliye"	Deva	
1998	Unnudan	"Vaanam Tharaiyil"	Deva	
1998	Unnudan	"Kobama"	Deva	
1998	Desiya Geetham	"En Kanavinai"	Ilaiyaraaja	
1998	Pudhumai Pithan	"Onnu Rendu"(Male)	Deva	
1998	Uyirodu Uyiraga	"Anbae Anbae"	Vidyasagar	K. S. Chithra
1998	Pooveli	"Itharku Peyar"(Duet)	Bharadwaj	
1998	Pooveli	"Itharku Peyar"(Solo)	Bharadwaj	
1998	Kaadhal Kavithai	"Diana Diana"	Ilaiyaraaja	
1998	Kaadhal Kavithai	"Kadhal Meethu"	Ilaiyaraaja	
1998	Kaadhal Kavithai	"Manasa Thotta Kadhal"	Ilaiyaraaja	
1998	Anandha Mazhai	"Orunaal Unai"	Deva	
1998	Anandha Mazhai	"Yen Manase"	Deva	
1999	Mannavaru Chinnavaru	"Konji Pesu"	Geethapriyan	Sadhana Sargam
1999	Ponnu Veetukkaran	"Nandhavana Kuyile"	Ilaiyaraaja	
1999	Thodarum	"Shockadikkum"	Ilaiyaraaja	
1999	Thullatha Manamum Thullum	"Thoda Thodu Enavae Vanavil"	S. A. Rajkumar	K. S. Chithra
1999	Thullatha Manamum Thullum	"Iruvathu Kodi"	S. A. Rajkumar	
1999	Ninaivirukkum Varai	"Oh Vennila"	Deva	
1999	Unnai Thedi	"Malavika"	Deva	
1999	Unnai Thedi	"Naalai Kalai Neril"	Deva	
1999	Unnai Thedi	"Neethana Neethana"	Deva	Sujatha Mohan
1999	Unnai Thedi	"Poralae Poralae"	Deva	
1999	Chinna Raja	"Paadavaa"	Deva	
1999	Endrendrum Kadhal	"Ulagellam"	Manoj–Gyan	
1999	Monisha En Monalisa	"Uyire Vaa Urave Vaa"	T. Rajendar	
1999	Periyanna	"Nilave Nilave"	Bharani	
1999	Nilave Mugam Kaattu	"Thendralai Kandu"	Ilaiyaraaja	
1999	Nilave Mugam Kaattu	"Vaigai Nadhi Karai"	Ilaiyaraaja	
1999	Poomagal Oorvalam	"Malare Oru Varthai"	Siva	
1999	Poomagal Oorvalam	"Chinna Vennilave"	Siva	
1999	Vaalee	"Sona Sona"	Deva	
1999	Rajasthan	"Jai Jawan"	Ilaiyaraaja	
1999	Anantha Poongatre	"Semeena"	Deva	
1999	Anantha Poongatre	"Solai Kuyil"(Duet)	Deva	
1999	Anantha Poongatre	"Vaikkasi Oram"	Deva	
1999	Anantha Poongatre	"Paatukku Paalaivanam"	Deva	
1999	Nenjinile	"Anbe Anbe"	Deva	
1999	Nenjinile	"Manasaey"	Deva	Sadhana Sargam
1999	Oruvan	"Chinna Roja"	Deva	
1999	Oruvan	"Gopala Gopala"	Deva	
1999	Kadhalar Dhinam	"Roja Roja"(Sad)	A. R. Rahman	
1999	Sangamam	"Mazhai Thulli"	A. R. Rahman	M. S. Viswanathan
1999	Sangamam	"Alaaala Kanda"	A. R. Rahman	M. S. Viswanathan
1999	Suyamvaram	"Sekka Sivanthavelea"	Sirpy	
1999	Rojavanam	"Unnai Partha Kangal"	Bharadwaj	
1999	Kanave Kalaiyadhe	"Poosu Manjal"(Male)	Deva	
1999	Malabar Police	"En Kannadi Thoppukkulle"	S. A. Rajkumar	
1999	Poovellam Kettuppar	"Chudithar Aninthu"	Yuvan Shankar Raja	Sadhana Sargam
1999	Poovellam Kettuppar	"Irava Pagala"	Yuvan Shankar Raja	Sujatha Mohan
1999	Kannodu Kanbathellam	"Iruvathu Vayadhuvarai"	Deva	S. Janaki
1999	Kannodu Kanbathellam	"Taj Mahal Ondru"	Deva	
1999	Kannodu Kanbathellam	"Iruvathu Vayadhuvarai"(Male)	Deva	
1999	Nee Varuvai Ena	"Oru Devathai"(Male)	S. A. Rajkumar	
1999	Thaalam	"Kalaimaane"	A. R. Rahman	
1999	Jodi	"Oru Poiyavadhu"(Male)	A. R. Rahman	
1999	Minsara Kanna	"Oodha Oodha"	Deva	Harini
1999	Minsara Kanna	"Un Per Solla"(Duet)	Deva	Sujatha Mohan
1999	Unakkaga Ellam Unakkaga	"Vennila Veliye"	Yuvan Shankar Raja	
1999	Nesam Pudhusu	"Meera Meera"	Bobby	
1999	Maravathe Kanmaniye	"Vaanirukku Nilavirukku"	Mahakumar	
1999	Maravathe Kanmaniye	"Venilavae Venilavae"	Mahakumar	
1999	Maravathe Kanmaniye	"Aiyo Honey Baby"	Mahakumar	
1999	Hello	"Intha Nimisham"	Deva	
1999	Kannupada Poguthaiya	"Mookuthi Muthazhaghu"	S. A. Rajkumar	
1999	Mudhalvan	"Kurukku Chiruththavale"	A. R. Rahman	Mahalakshmi Iyer
1999	Mudhalvan	"Ulundhu Vithakkaiyilae"	A. R. Rahman	
1999	Ooty	"India India"	Deva	
1999	Time	"Thavikkiren"	Ilaiyaraaja	
1999	Azhagarsamy	"Eranju Maadham"	Deva	
1999	Azhagarsamy	"Pachchai Marikozhunthu"	Deva	
1999	Aasaiyil Oru Kaditham	"Nee Irunthal Naan"	Deva	
1999	Manam Virumbuthe Unnai	"Ilavenirkala Panjami"	Ilaiyaraaja	
1999	Manam Virumbuthe Unnai	"Kutti Kuyilai"	Ilaiyaraaja	
1999	Manam Virumbuthe Unnai	"Yetho Yetho"	Ilaiyaraaja	
1999	Paattali	"Kadhal Azhaga"	S. A. Rajkumar	
1999	Paattali	"Srirangam Petru Thandha"	S. A. Rajkumar	
2000	Kannukkul Nilavu	"Nilavu Paatu"	Ilaiyaraaja	
2000	Vaanathaippola	"Kadhal Vennila"	S. A. Rajkumar	
2000	Eazhaiyin Sirippil	"Purave En"	Deva	Sujatha Mohan
2000	Hey Ram	"Nee Partha"	Ilaiyaraaja	Asha Bhosle
2000	Hey Ram	"Ramaranalum"	Ilaiyaraaja	Kamal Haasan, Jolly Mukherjee
2000	Sudhandhiram	"Ennammo Matram"	S. A. Rajkumar	Sujatha Mohan
2000	Sudhandhiram	"Varthai Illamal"	S. A. Rajkumar	K. S. Chithra
2000	Sudhandhiram	"Mazhai Mazhai"	S. A. Rajkumar	Sujatha Mohan
2000	Thai Poranthachu	"Nilave Nilave"	Deva	
2000	Mugavaree	"Oh Nenje"	Deva	Swarnalatha
2000	Mugavaree	"Keechu Kiliye"(Male)	Deva	
2000	Alaipayuthey	"Pachchai Nirame"	A. R. Rahman	Clinton Cerejo
2000	Vallarasu	"Aruppukottai Akka"	Deva	Sujatha Mohan
2000	Kandukondain Kandukondain	"Kandukondain Kandukondain"	A. R. Rahman	Mahalakshmi Iyer
2000	Kandukondain Kandukondain	"Suttum Vizhi"	A. R. Rahman	
2000	Kushi	"Oru Ponnu Onnu"	Deva	Anuradha Sriram
2000	Kushi	"Mottu Onru"	Deva	Sadhana Sargam
2000	Kannan Varuvaan	"Kaatrukku Pookal"	Sirpy	Sujatha Mohan
2000	Kannan Varuvaan	"Vennilavae Vennilavae"	Sirpy	
2000	Unnai Kodu Ennai Tharuven	"Ithayathai Kanavillai"	S. A. Rajkumar	
2000	Karisakattu Poove	"Aayiram Kodi"	Ilaiyaraaja	
2000	Appu	"Yeno Yeno"	Deva	Sujatha Mohan, Harini
2000	Appu	"Koila Koila"	Deva	Anuradha Sriram
2000	Simmasanam	"Manja Manja Kizhangu"	S. A. Rajkumar	K. S. Chithra, Swarnalatha
2000	Doubles	"Naan Ippo"	Srikanth Deva	
2000	Kannaal Pesavaa	"Kann Azhage"	Deva	
2000	Budget Padmanabhan	"Azhagusundari"	S. A. Rajkumar	K. S. Chithra
2000	Puratchikkaaran	"Thaazhntha"	Vidyasagar	
2000	Uyirile Kalanthathu	"Uyire Uyire Alzaithathenna"	Deva	Sujatha Mohan
2000	Uyirile Kalanthathu	"Deva Deva Devathaiye"	Deva	Harini
2000	Priyamaanavale	"Ennavo Ennavo"	S. A. Rajkumar	Mahalakshmi Iyer
2000	Priyamaanavale	"Enakoru Snegidhi"	S. A. Rajkumar	Mahalakshmi Iyer
2000	Thenali	"Athini Sithini"	A. R. Rahman	Chitra Sivaraman, Kamal Haasan
2000	Vaanavil	"Velinattu Kaatru"	Deva	Harini
2000	Seenu	"Madhava Sethumadhava"	Deva	
2000	Seenu	"Vanakkam"	Deva	
2000	Anbudan	"Oru Kadhal Devathai"	Jai	
2000	Vanna Thamizh Pattu	"Enna Solli Paaduven"	S. A. Rajkumar	K. S. Chithra
2000	Vanna Thamizh Pattu	"Velicham Adikuthadi"	S. A. Rajkumar	
2000	Ennavalle	"Adi Kadhal Enbathu"	S. A. Rajkumar	
2001	Dheena	"Sollamal Thottu Chellum"	Yuvan Shankar Raja	
2001	Friends	"Thendral Varum"	Ilaiyaraaja	Bhavatharini
2001	Friends	"Kuyilikku Koo Koo"	Ilaiyaraaja	S. P. Balasubrahmanyam, Shankar Mahadevan
2001	Friends	"Penkaloda Potti"	Ilaiyaraaja	Sujatha Mohan
2001	Friends	"Poonkatrae"	Ilaiyaraaja	
2001	Ullam Kollai Poguthae	"Uyirae Enuyirae"	Karthik Raja	
2001	Ullam Kollai Poguthae	"Oru Palaivanathai"	Karthik Raja	
2001	Ullam Kollai Poguthae	"Kavithaikal Sollava"	Karthik Raja	
2001	Ullam Kollai Poguthae	"Kathavai Naan"	Karthik Raja	Karthik Raja
2001	Ullam Kollai Poguthae	"Adadaa Adadaa"	Karthik Raja	
2001	Piriyadha Varam Vendum	"Privondrai Santhithen"	S. A. Rajkumar	
2001	Rishi	"Vaa Vaa Poove Vaa"	Yuvan Shankar Raja	S. Janaki
2001	Rishi	"Oh Mane Mane"(Male)	Yuvan Shankar Raja	
2001	Thaalikaatha Kaaliamman	"Mela Satham"	Sirpy	Sujatha Mohan
2001	En Purushan Kuzhandhai Maadhiri	"Chithiraye"	Deva	Anuradha Sriram
2001	Paarvai Ondre Podhume	"Thuli Thuliyaai Kottum Mazhai"	Bharani	Swarnalatha
2001	Dumm Dumm Dumm	"Ragasiyamai"	Karthik Raja	Sadhana Sargam, Ramanathan
2001	Middle Class Madhavan	"Ammamma Thaankaadhu"	Dhina	Sujatha Mohan
2001	Aanandham	"Enna Idhuvo"	S. A. Rajkumar	
2001	Sonnal Thaan Kaadhala	"Sonnalthaan"(Duet)	T. Rajendar	K. S. Chithra
2001	Sonnal Thaan Kaadhala	"Sonnalthaan"(Solo)	T. Rajendar	
2001	Citizen	"Australia Desam"	Deva	Harini
2001	Lovely	"Vinodhamanavale"(Duet)	Deva	Sujatha Mohan
2001	Lovely	"Vinodhamanavale"(Solo)	Deva	
2001	Kanna Unnai Thedukiren	"Oor Urangum Nerathil"	Ilaiyaraaja	
2001	Kanna Unnai Thedukiren	"Vanchi Kodi"	Ilaiyaraaja	Bhavatharini
2001	Vedham	"Malai Kaatru"	Vidyasagar	Mahalakshmi Iyer
2001	Vedham	"Mudhal Poo"	Vidyasagar	Sujatha Mohan
2001	Samudhiram	"Kandupidi"	Sabesh–Murali	Ganga
2001	Chocolate	"Kappaleh Kappaleh"	Deva	Mahalakshmi Iyer
2001	Alli Thandha Vaanam	"Thom Thom"	Vidyasagar	Harini, K. S. Chithra
2001	Kasi	"Aathorathile Aalamaram"	Ilaiyaraaja	
2001	Kasi	"En Mana Vaanil"	Ilaiyaraaja	
2001	Kasi	"Maanu Tholu"	Ilaiyaraaja	
2001	Kasi	"Naan Kaanum Ulagangal"	Ilaiyaraaja	
2001	Kasi	"Punniyam Thedi Kasikku"	Ilaiyaraaja	
2001	Kasi	"Rokkam Irukura Makkal"	Ilaiyaraaja	Sujatha Mohan
2001	Manadhai Thirudivittai	"Sadugudugudu Aadathey"	Yuvan Shankar Raja	Bhavatharini
2001	Azhagana Naatkal	"Chik Chik Chinnakiliye"	Deva	Shaisan
2001	Majunu	"Gulmohar Malare"	Harris Jayaraj	Timmy, Annupamaa
2001	Kaadhale Swasam	"Kadhale Kadhale Swasam"	D. Imman	
2001	Kaadhale Swasam	"Manma Valikkude"	D. Imman	
2002	Pammal K. Sambandam	"Sakalakala Vallavane"	Deva	Sujatha Mohan
2002	Punnagai Desam	"Ennai Pada Vaitha"	S. A. Rajkumar	
2002	Red	"Roja Kaathu"	Deva	
2002	Red	"November Madham"	Deva	Mahalakshmi Iyer
2002	Kannathil Muthamittal	"Sundari"	A. R. Rahman	Tippu, Sujatha Mohan, Karthik, Srimathumitha
2002	Kamarasu	"Chinna Chinna Vilakke"	S. A. Rajkumar	
2002	Roja Kootam	"Mottugale Mottugale"	Bharadwaj	Sadhana Sargam
2002	Unnai Ninaithu	"Yaar Indha Devathai"	Sirpy	
2002	Pesadha Kannum Pesume	"Oh Nila"	Bharani	
2002	Devan	"Thaalaattum Kaatre"	Ilaiyaraaja	Sujatha Mohan
2002	Raja	"Oru Pouranami"	S. A. Rajkumar	Mahalakshmi Iyer
2002	Samurai	"Moongil Kaadugale"	Harris Jayaraj	Tippu
2002	Guruvamma	"Megame"	Sahithya	
2002	Youth	"Sagiyea Sagiyea"	Mani Sharma	Harini
2002	Run	"Poi Solla Koodathu"	Vidyasagar	Sadhana Sargam
2002	En Mana Vaanil	"Enna Solli Paduvatho"	Ilaiyaraaja	Sadhana Sargam
2002	En Mana Vaanil	"Unnai Kannum Pothu"	Ilaiyaraaja	
2002	En Mana Vaanil	"Unnai Thedi"	Ilaiyaraaja	
2002	Album	"Chellame Chellam"	Karthik Raja	Shreya Ghoshal
2002	Ramanaa	"Vennilavin Perai"	Ilaiyaraaja	Sadhana Sargam
2002	Ramanaa	"Vaanaville"(Duet)	Ilaiyaraaja	Sadhana Sargam
2002	Villain	"Orae Manam"	Vidyasagar	Chandana Bala Kalyan
2002	I Love You Da	"Oh Priya"	Bharadwaj	
2002	Mounam Pesiyadhe	"Chinna Chinnathai"	Yuvan Shankar Raja	Yuvan Shankar Raja
2002	Mounam Pesiyadhe	"Eh Nanbane Kopam"	Yuvan Shankar Raja	Shankar Mahadevan
2002	Style	"Kadhalithal"(Male)	Bharani	
2002	Virumbugiren	"Kombu Mulaitha"	Deva	Sophia, Satish
2003	Chokka Thangam	"En Jannal"	Deva	Sadhana Sargam
2003	Vaseegara	"Poopola Theepola"	S. A. Rajkumar	
2003	Vaseegara	"Oru Thadavai Sollvaya"	S. A. Rajkumar	Chinmayi
2003	Pop Corn	"Antha Semai Thurai"	Yuvan Shankar Raja	Manikka Vinayagam, Sujatha Mohan
2003	Pop Corn	"En Isaikku"	Yuvan Shankar Raja	Sriram Parthasarathy
2003	Anbu	"Thavamindri Kidaitha"	Vidyasagar	Sadhana Sargam
2003	Yes Madam	"Samimelai Sathyam"	Bharani	Sujatha Mohan
2003	Manasellam	"Nee Thoongum Nerathil"	Ilaiyaraaja	Sadhana Sargam
2003	Manasellam	"Nilaviniley"	Ilaiyaraaja	Sadhana Sargam
2003	Dum	"Manase Manase"	Deva	
2003	Kadhal Sadugudu	"Magathil Ondrai Nindrom"	Deva	Sujatha Mohan
2003	Anbe Anbe	"Anbe Anbe"	Bharadwaj	Sadhana Sargam
2003	Saamy	"Pudichirukku"	Harris Jayaraj	Mahathi
2003	Pudhiya Geethai	"Vasiyakaara"(Version ll)	Yuvan Shankar Raja	Chitra Sivaraman
2003	Parasuram	"Dolna Dolna"	A. R. Rahman	Sujatha Mohan
2003	Priyamaana Thozhi	"Maankuttiye"	S. A. Rajkumar	Sujatha Mohan
2003	Priyamaana Thozhi	"Vaanam Enna Vaanam"	S. A. Rajkumar	
2003	Priyamaana Thozhi	"Entha Desathil"	S. A. Rajkumar	
2003	Kaiyodu Kai	"Iru Manam"	Banapathra	
2003	Jay Jay	"Unnai Naan"	Bharadwaj	
2003	Anbe Un Vasam	"Aasarai Vaithai"	Dhina	
2003	Soori	"Kadavullae Kadavullae"	Deva	
2004	Engal Anna	"Mudhan Mudhalaga"	Deva	Sadhana Sargam
2004	Kangalal Kaidhu Sei	"Azhagiya Cinderella"	A. R. Rahman	
2004	Udhaya	"Pookum Malarai"	A. R. Rahman	
2004	Udhaya	"Udhaya Udhaya"	A. R. Rahman	Sadhana Sargam
2004	Kadhal Dot Com	"Kadhal Kadhal"	Bharadwaj	Priyadarshini
2004	Aethirree	"Mudhal Mudhalaga"	Yuvan Shankar Raja	
2004	Vaanam Vasappadum	"Uyirae"	Mahesh Mahadevan	Ganga
2004	Vaanam Vasappadum	"Kangal Theendi"	Mahesh Mahadevan	Shweta Mohan
2004	Arul	"Oddiyaanam"	Harris Jayaraj	Srimathumitha
2004	Perazhagan	"Orae Oru Piravi"	Yuvan Shankar Raja	
2004	Maanasthan	"Raasa Raasa"	S. A. Rajkumar	K. S. Chithra
2004	Machi	"Maname"	A. R. Reihana	
2004	New	"Thootal Poo Malarum"	A. R. Rahman	Harini
2004	Sullan	"Yaaro Nee"	Vidyasagar	Sujatha Mohan
2004	Vasool Raja MBBS	"Kaddu Thiranthae"	Bharadwaj	Sadhana Sargam
2004	Chellamae	"Aariya Udhadugal"	Harris Jayaraj	Swarnalatha
2004	Gomathy Nayagam	"Valaiyosai Valaikindrathe"	M. Jayachandran	Sadhana Sargam
2005	Desam	"Unnai Kelai"	A. R. Rahman	T. L. Maharajan
2005	Kicha Vayasu 16	"Solla Mudiyala"	Srikanth Deva	Chinmayi
2005	Thaka Thimi Tha	"Kadhalai Yaaradi"	D. Imman	Mathangi Jagdish
2005	Priyasakhi	"Chinna Magaraniye"	Bharadwaj	Zambia Raja
2005	Power of Women	"Penne Undhan"	Vidyasagar	
2005	Power of Women	"Maragatha Mazhaithuli"	Vidyasagar	Sadhana Sargam
2005	Power of Women	"Malare Nee Vazhga"	Vidyasagar	Sujatha Mohan
2005	Ullam Ketkumae	"O Maname"	Harris Jayaraj	
2005	Anniyan	"Iyengaaru Veetu"	Harris Jayaraj	Harini
2005	Daas	"Saami Kittay"	Yuvan Shankar Raja	Shreya Ghoshal
2005	Daas	"Shaheeba"	Yuvan Shankar Raja	Sujatha Mohan
2005	Oru Naal Oru Kanavu	"Kaatril Varum"	Ilaiyaraaja	Bhavatharini, Shreya Ghoshal, Sadhana Sargam
2005	Oru Naal Oru Kanavu	"Khajiraho"	Ilaiyaraaja	Shreya Ghoshal
2005	Anbe Aaruyire	"Varugiraai"	A. R. Rahman	K. S. Chithra
2005	Aaru	"Dhrogam"	Devi Sri Prasad	
2006	Aathi	"Ennai Konja Konja"	Vidyasagar	Sujatha Mohan
2006	Amirtham	"Enn Kadhale"	Bhavatharini	Mathangi Jagdish
2006	Chithiram Pesuthadi	"Aaahayam Aaahayam"	Sundar C. Babu	
2006	June R	"Mazhaye Mazhaye"	Sharreth	
2006	Mercury Pookkal	"Solla Vaarthaigal"	Karthik Raja	Ganga, Udit Narayan
2006	Uyir	"Kan Simittum Nerame"	Joshua Sridhar	
2006	Vettaiyaadu Vilaiyaadu	"Manjal Veyil"	Harris Jayaraj	Krish, Nakul
2006	E	"Kadhal Enbathu"	Srikanth Deva	
2006	Iruvar Mattum	"Azhaga Azhaga"	Vijay Antony	Sadhana Sargam
2006	Iruvar Mattum	"Poovin Madiyil"	Vijay Antony	Sadhana Sargam
2006	Iruvar Mattum	"Roja Poovin"	Vijay Antony	Sadhana Sargam
2006	Nenjirukkum Varai	"Oru Murai Piranthen"	Srikanth Deva	Sadhana Sargam
2006	Adaikalam	"Uyirae Priyathe"	Sabesh–Murali	Sadhana Sargam
2007	Thaamirabharani	"Thaaliyae Thevaiyillai"	Yuvan Shankar Raja	Bhavatharini
2007	Pori	"Pookkalellam"	Dhina	
2007	Koodal Nagar	"Tamil Selvi"	Sabesh–Murali	Sadhana Sargam
2007	Karuppusamy Kuththagaithaarar	"Oorellam"	Dhina	
2007	Nee Naan Nila	"Ooria Marandhom"	Dhina	
2007	Sivaji: The Boss	"Vaaji Vaaji"	A. R. Rahman	Madhushree
2007	Viyabari	"Aasai Patta"	Deva	Vaishali Unnikrishnan
2007	Urchagam	"Narum Pookkal"	Ranjit Barot	Nandini Srikar
2007	Manase Mounama	"Achutha Azhage"	Naga	Sadhana Sargam
2007	Machakaaran	"Nee Nee Nee"	Yuvan Shankar Raja	Madhushree
2007	Kanna	"Aayiram Kelvigal"	Ranjit Barot	
2008	Bheemaa	"Ragasiya Kanavugal"	Harris Jayaraj	Madhushree
2008	Bheemaa	"Mudhal Mazhai"	Harris Jayaraj	Mahathi, R. Prasanna
2008	Yaaradi Nee Mohini	"Vennmegam"	Yuvan Shankar Raja	
2008	Dasavathaaram	"Kallai Mattum"	Himesh Reshammiya	
2008	Kuselan	"Sollamma"	G. V. Prakash Kumar	
2008	Satyam	"Aaradi Kaathe"	Harris Jayaraj	
2008	Jayamkondaan	"Naan Varaindhu Vaitha"	Vidyasagar	Madhushree
2008	Seval	"Thulasi Chediyum Aralipoovum"	G. V. Prakash Kumar	Deepa Miriam
2008	Vaaranam Aayiram	"Nenjukkul Peidhidum"	Harris Jayaraj	Devan Ekambaram, R. Prasanna
2008	Thiruvannamalai	"Solla Solla"	Srikanth Deva	Sadhana Sargam
2009	Adada Enna Azhagu	"Unnai Enakku"	Jeevan Thomos	
2009	Ayan	"Pala Pala"	Harris Jayaraj	
2009	Mariyadhai	"Devathai Desathil"	Vijay Antony	Shreya Ghoshal
2009	Mariyadhai	"Yaar Paarthathu"	Vijay Antony	Vinaya
2009	Naadodigal	"Ulagil Yentha"	Sundar C. Babu	
2009	Naadodigal	"Pain Of Love"	Sundar C. Babu	
2009	Sirithal Rasipen	"Enakulle Irupaval"	Iniyavan	K. S. Chithra
2009	Indira Vizha	"Mogamma"	Yathish Mahadev	Sujatha Mohan
2009	Modhi Vilayadu	"Modhi Vilayaadu"	Colonial Cousins	Deva
2009	Modhi Vilayadu	"Vellaikaari"	Colonial Cousins	Lesle Lewis, Achu
2009	Madurai Sambavam	"Kulathil"	John Peter	Chinmayi
2009	Arumugam	"Yamini"	Deva	Sadhana Sargam
2009	Suriyan Satta Kalloori	"Guru Brahmma Guru Vishnu"	Deva	Sadhana Sargam
2009	Kanden Kadhalai	"Suthudhu Suthudhu"	Vidyasagar	
2010	Jaggubhai	"Yezhu Vannathil"	Rafee	Maheshwari Rani
2010	Tamizh Padam	"O Maha Zeeya"	Kannan	Shweta Mohan
2010	Thambikku Indha Ooru	"Yaaradi"	Dharan Kumar	Shreya Ghoshal
2010	Rettaisuzhi	"Naan Endru"(Version l)	Karthik Raja	Haricharan, Sriram Parthasarathy
2010	Rettaisuzhi	"Poochandi Kannazhagi"	Karthik Raja	Shreya Ghoshal
2010	Rettaisuzhi	"Naan Endru"(Version ll)	Karthik Raja	
2010	Kattradhu Kalavu	"Indha Vaanam Indha Bhoomi"	Paul Jacob	Anuradha Sriram
2010	Pen Singam	"Nee Sonnal Theipirai"	Deva	Srimathumitha
2010	Madrasapattinam	"Kaatrile"	G. V. Prakash Kumar	Zia
2010	Virunthali	"Eppodhu Un Jannal"	S. S. Kumaran	Mahalakshmi Iyer
2010	Thambi Arjuna	"Hajarea Hajarea"	Dhina	Fardeen Khan, Rita
2010	Enthiran	"Arima Arima"	A. R. Rahman	Sadhana Sargam, Benny Dayal, Naresh Iyer
2010	Naane Ennul Illai	"Naane Ennul"(Version l)	Amresh Ganesh	Sadhana Sargam
2010	Naane Ennul Illai	"Naane Ennul"(Version ll)	Amresh Ganesh	Sadhana Sargam
2010	Chikku Bukku	"Thooral Nindralum"	Colonial Cousins	Wadali Brothers, Anuradha Sriram
2010	Virudhagiri	"Devathai Ondru"	Sundar C. Babu	Chinmayi
2011	Sollitharava	"Azhagiya Selai"(Version ll)	E K Bobby	
2011	Ilaignan	"Thozha Vaanam"	Vidyasagar	
2011	Pathinaaru	"Adada En Meethu"	Yuvan Shankar Raja	Bela Shende
2011	Thoonga Nagaram	"Koorana Paarvaigal"	Sundar C. Babu	Chinmayi
2011	Nandhi	"Idhuthaan Kaathal"(Version l)	Bharadwaj	
2011	Aadu Puli	"Unnai Ninaithadume"	Sundar C. Babu	Sujatha Mohan
2011	Seedan	"Saravana Samaiyal"	Dhina	Dhanush, K. J. Yesudas
2011	Kullanari Koottam	"Kadhal Enbadhai"	V. Selvaganesh	
2011	Urumi	"Yaaro Nee Yaaro"	Deepak Dev	Shweta Mohan
2011	Ko	"Amali Thumali"	Harris Jayaraj	Shweta Mohan, Chinmayi
2011	Pillaiyar Theru Kadaisi Veedu	"Enakkoru Devathai"	Chakri	Kousalya
2011	Potta Potti	"Iduvarai Iduvarai"	Aruldev	Mahathi, Aruldev
2011	Puli Vesham	"Thiruda Thiruda"	Srikanth Deva	Vinaitha
2011	Vandhaan Vendraan	"Mudivilla Mazhaiyodu"	S. Thaman	
2011	Vellore Maavattam	"Vaanam Ellam"	Sundar C. Babu	Shruthi
2011	Maharaja	"Mexi Mexican Lady"	D. Imman	
2011	Margazhi 16	"Konjam Veyilaga"	E K Bobby	
2012	Udumban	"Kaatrilellam"	Ramji S Bala	
2012	Udumban	"Kandavudan Kadhal"	Ramji S Bala	
2012	Udumban	"Pallikoodam Mudhalmani'	Ramji S Bala	
2012	Dhoni	"Vilayaattaa Padagotty"(Male)	Ilaiyaraaja	
2012	Maasi	"Kandene"(Version I)	Dhina	Sadhana Sargam
2012	Maasi	"Kandene"(Version II)	Dhina	Anbulakshmi
2012	Vinmeengal	"Un Paarvai"	Jubin	Harini
2012	Murattu Kaalai	"Punnagai Enna Vilai"	Srikanth Deva	Shraviya
2012	Thuppakki	"Kutti Puli Kootam"	Harris Jayaraj	Tippu, Dr. Narayanan, Sathyan, Ranina Reddy
2012	Thuppakki	"Vennilave"	Harris Jayaraj	Bombay Jayashree
2013	Ambikapathy	"Unnaal Unnaal"	A. R. Rahman	Pooja Vaidyanath, Haricharan
2013	Endrendrum Punnagai	"Ennai Saaithaalae"	Harris Jayaraj	Shreya Ghoshal
2013	Idharkuthane Aasaipattai Balakumara	"Yaen Endral"	Siddharth Vipin	Vishnupriya Ravi, R Maalavika Manoj
2013	Irandaam Ulagam	"Raakkozhi Raakkozhi"	Harris Jayaraj	Palakkad Sriram
2013	Ponmaalai Pozhudhu	"Adikadi Mudi"	C. Sathya	Priya Himesh
2013	Singam II	"Vidhai Pola"	Devi Sri Prasad	
2014	Kabadam	"Unnale Naan Maarinen"	Sazzy	Sachin
2014	Aal	"Poda Po"(Ver l)	Johan Shevanesh	
2014	Aal	"Poda Po"(Ver ll)	Johan Shevanesh	
2015	Anegan	"Thodu Vaanam"	Harris Jayaraj	Shakthisree Gopalan
2015	Papanasam	"Vinaa Vinaa"	Ghibran	
2015	Rudhramadevi	"Unnal Un Munnal"	Ilaiyaraaja	Sadhana Sargam
2015	Sivappu	"Sadugudu Vizhiyil"	N. R. Raghunanthan	
2016	Kadalai	"Otha Mazhaiyila"	Sam C. S.	
2016	Pugazh	"Vizhigalil Vizhundhavalo"	Vivek–Mervin	K. S. Chithra
2016	Theri	"En Jeevan"	G. V. Prakash Kumar	Saindhavi
2016	Uyire Uyire	"Devadhai Paarkiral"	Aravind Shankar	Saindhavi
2017	Nenjil Thunivirundhal	"Aram Seyya Virumba"	D. Imman	
2017	Puriyatha Puthir	"Vellai Kanavu"	Sam C. S.	Harini
2018	Azhagumagan	"Manasula Manasula"	James Vasanthan	
2018	Kalari	"Yaaradhu"	V V Prasanna	M M Monisha
2019	Viswasam	"Vaaney Vaaney"	D. Imman	Shreya Ghoshal
2019	Dev	"Anangae Sinungalama"	Harris Jayaraj	Christopher Stanley, Tippu, Krish, Arjun Chandy, Bharath Sundar, Sharanya Gopinath
2019	Rocky: The Revenge	"Sanjari"	Charan Arjun	Sreedhip, Naina Nayar
2020	Yaadhumagi Nindraai	"Aayiram Kavidhaigal"	Bharadwaj	
2021	Aranmanai 3	"Theeyaga Thondri"	C. Sathya	Shankar Mahadevan
2022	Ayngaran	"Uyirinum Uyarndha"	G. V. Prakash Kumar	
2022	Sita Ramam	"Thoodha"	Vishal Chandrashekhar	K. S. Chithra
2023	Ariyavan	"Yaarayum Velgira"	James Vasanthan	K. S. Chithra
2024	Rathnam	"Yeduvaraiyo"	Devi Sri Prasad	
2024	Dhruva Natchathiram: Chapter One – Yuddha Kaandam	"Arugil"	Harris Jayaraj	Tanvi Shah

== Telugu Songs ==
Year	Movie	Song	Composer(s)	Writer(s)	Co-singer(s)
1995	Aasha Aasha Aasha	"Konchem Aagara"	Deva	Sirivennela Sitaramasastri	
1995	Bombay	"Urike Chilaka"	A. R. Rahman	Veturi Sundaramurti	K. S. Chithra
1995	Bombay	"Kuchi Kuchi"	A. R. Rahman	Veturi Sundaramurti	Swarnalatha
1995	Gulabi	"Class Roomlo"	Shashi Preetam	Sirivennela Sitaramasastri	
1995	Indira	"Laali Laali"(Male)	A. R. Rahman	Sirivennela Sitaramasastri	
1995	Muthu	"Visirinadha"	A. R. Rahman	Bhuvana Chandra	
1995	Rangeli	"Hai Rama"	A. R. Rahman	Sirivennela Sitaramasastri	Swarnalatha
1995	Rangeli	"Emito Emo"	A. R. Rahman		Kavita Krishnamurti
1996	Bharatheeyudu	"Telephone Dhwanila"	A. R. Rahman		
1996	Love Birds	"Manasuna Manasuga"	A. R. Rahman		K. S. Chithra
1996	Mr. Romeo	"Romeo Natyam"	A. R. Rahman		
1996	Ninne Pelladata	"Kannullo Nee Roopame"	Sandeep Chowta		K. S. Chithra
1996	Ninne Pelladata	"Inka Yedho Kavalantu"	Sandeep Chowta		
1996	Prema Desham	"College Style"	A. R. Rahman		S.P. Balasubrahmanyam, KK
1996	Sampradhayam	"Kotha Kothaga Unnadi"	S. V. Krishna Reddy		
1997	Arunachalam	"Evarevaru Sonthamura"	Deva		
1997	Aahvaanam	"Hai Hai Menaka"	S. V. Krishna Reddy		K. S. Chithra
1997	Aahvaanam	"Minsare Minsare"	S. V. Krishna Reddy		K. S. Chithra
1997	Iddharu	"Kallaku Ganthalu"	A. R. Rahman		
1997	Master	"Thilothama"	Deva		Sujatha Mohan
1997	Merupu Kalalu	"Vennelave Vennelave"	A. R. Rahman		
1997	Merupu Kalalu	"Vennelave Vennelave"(Sad)	A. R. Rahman		
1997	Nenu Premisthunnanu	"Baby Baby"	Sirpy		K. S. Chithra
1997	Priyaragalu	"Chinuku Thadi"	M. M. Keeravani		K. S. Chithra
1997	Rakshakudu	"Chandhuruni Thakinadhi"	A. R. Rahman		
1997	Thaali	"Emaindho Emo"	Vidyasagar		K. S. Chithra
1997	Egire Paavurama	"Runa Laila Vanalaaga"	S. V. Krishna Reddy		
1998	Aavida Maa Aavide	"Om Namami"	Sri Kommineni		K. S. Chithra
1998	Auto Driver	"Chandamama"	Deva		
1998	Baavagaru Bagunnaraa	"Navami Dashami"	Mani Sharma		
1998	Choodalani Vundi	"Yamaha Nagari"	Mani Sharma		
1998	Ganesh	"Raja Hamsavo"	Mani Sharma		
1998	Manasichi Choodu	"Jili Bili Jaabili"	Mani Sharma		K. S. Chithra
1998	Suryavamsam	"Rojave Chinni"(Male)	S. A. Rajkumar		
1998	Suswagatham	"Suswagatham Navaragama"	S. A. Rajkumar		K. S. Chithra
1999	Alludugaaru Vachcharu	"Marugela Musugela"	M. M. Keeravani		
1999	Hello My Dear Monisha	"O Prema"	T. Rajendar		
1999	Jodi	"Nanu Preminchananu"(Male)	A. R. Rahman		
1999	Oke Okkadu	"Nelluri Nerajana"	A. R. Rahman		
1999	Prema Gharshana	"Taj Mahal Okati"	Deva		
1999	Seenu	"Premante Emitante"	Mani Sharma		
1999	Seenu	"Emani Cheppanu"	Mani Sharma		
1999	Swapna Lokham	"Premisthunna"	Vandemataram Srinivas		
1999	Time	"Kanulake Theliyani"	Ilaiyaraaja		
1999	Vaalee	"Sona Sona"	Deva		
1999	Vichithram	"Manninchava Aparadham"	M. M. Keeravani		K. S. Chithra
1999	Yama Jathakudu	"Evaro Aa Sundhari"	Vandemataram Srinivas		
2000	Annayya	"Himaseemallo"	Mani Sharma		
2000	Annayya	"Vana Vallappa"	Mani Sharma		
2000	Azad	"Kala Anuko"	Mani Sharma		
2000	Azad	"Sudigaalilo"	Mani Sharma		K. S. Chithra
2000	Bagunnara	"Kallu Kallu Kalisaaka"	Deva		
2000	Chiru Navvutho	"Kanulu Kalisaayi"	Mani Sharma		K. S. Chithra
2000	Kalisundam Raa	"Nuvve Nuvve"	S. A. Rajkumar		
2000	Maa Annayya	"Neeli Ningilo"(Happy)	S. A. Rajkumar		
2000	Maa Annayya	"Neeli Ningilo"(Sad)	S. A. Rajkumar		
2000	Maharani	"Kothaga Melukundhi"	Deva		Harini
2000	Maharani	"Rathiri Gadavani"	Deva		Anuradha Sriram
2000	Manoharam	"Chooda Chakkani"	Mani Sharma		
2000	Ninne Premistha	"Premalekha Raasenu"	S. A. Rajkumar		
2000	Ninnu Choosaka	"Are Kasini Dhaachi"	S. A. Rajkumar		
2000	Nuvvu Vastavani	"Komma Komma"	S. A. Rajkumar		K. S. Chithra
2000	Pelli Sambandham	"Ammammo Mayagade"	S. A. Rajkumar		
2000	Priyuralu Pilichindi	"Thongi Choose"	A. R. Rahman		
2000	Priyuralu Pilichindi	"Velige Nee Kanule"	A. R. Rahman		
2000	Rayalaseema Ramanna Chowdary	"Allade Allade"	Mani Sharma		
2000	Sakhi	"Pachhan Dhaname""	A. R. Rahman		
2000	Sakutumba Saparivaara Sametam	"Love Is The Feeling"	S. V. Krishna Reddy		
2000	Sardukupodaam Randi	"Vagalaadi"	S. V. Krishna Reddy		
2000	Vamsoddharakudu	"Gudi Gantalu"(Version ll)	Koti		K. S. Chithra
2000	Yuvaraju	"Tholi Valape"	Ramana Gogula		K. S. Chithra
2001	Ammayi Kosam	"Anjali Anjali"	Vandemataram Srinivas		
2001	Andham	"Innallu"	Ghantadi Krishna		
2001	Bava Nachadu	"Anuragam Anuragamlo"	M. M. Keeravani		
2001	Citizen	"O Priyathama"	Deva		
2001	Daddy	"Gummadi Gummadi"	S. A. Rajkumar		
2001	Eduruleni Manishi	"Enaadaina Anukunnana"	S. A. Rajkumar		K. S. Chithra
2001	Eduruleni Manishi	"Manasannadi Annadi"	S. A. Rajkumar		K. S. Chithra
2001	Eduruleni Manishi	"Emaindamma Eenadu"	S. A. Rajkumar		
2001	Idhe Naa Modhati Prema Lekha	"Idhe Naa Modhati"	Ghantadi Krishna		
2001	Ishtam	"Nuvvante Ishtamani"	DJ Gopinath		K. S. Chithra
2001	Ishtam	"Evaraina Choosara"	DJ Gopinath		K. S. Chithra
2001	Itlu Sravani Subramanyam	"Malli Kuyave"	Chakri		
2001	Jabili	"Pada Pada Nee"	S. V. Krishna Reddy		
2001	Kalisi Naduddham	"Okka Saari Kindhika"	S. A. Rajkumar		
2001	Kalisi Naduddham	"Kanchaare Kanchaare"	S. A. Rajkumar		
2001	Mrugaraju	"Shatamaanam Annadhile"	Mani Sharma		
2001	Naalo Unna Prema	"Enno Enno"	Koti		
2001	Narasimha Naidu	"Ninna Kuttesinadhi"	Mani Sharma		
2001	Ninnu Choodalani	"Ye Chota Nenunna"	S. A. Rajkumar		
2001	Simharasi	"Thelusa Nesthama"	S. A. Rajkumar		
2001	Snehamante Idera	"Chelia Nee Premalone"	Shiva Shankar		
2001	Snehamante Idera	"Nesthama Nesthama"	Shiva Shankar		
2001	Subhakaryam	"Theeyani Oohani"	S. A. Rajkumar		K. S. Chithra
2001	Subhakaryam	"Vennela Vennela"	S. A. Rajkumar		
2001	Tholi Valapu	"Paalatho Kadigina"	Vandemataram Srinivas		K. S. Chithra
2002	Aaduthu Paaduthu	"Neeli Neeli"	Chakri		
2002	Amrutha	"Ye Devi Varamu"	A. R. Rahman		
2002	Bobby	"Adugadugu"	Mani Sharma		
2002	Cheliya Cheliya Chiru Kopama	"Cheli Ninnu Choosi"	Ashirvad		
2002	Indhra	"Bham Bham Bhole"	Mani Sharma		Shankar Mahadevan
2002	Kanulu Moosina Neevaye	"Chinna Navvu Challipove"	Chakri		
2002	Manasunte Chaalu	"Prathi Raathri Padhi"	Shiva Shankar		
2002	Manasutho	"Manasutho"	Ashirvad		Alka Yagnik
2002	Mandharam	"Kallallo"	Ghantadi Krishna		
2002	Neetho	"Navvaali Neetho"	Vidyasagar		
2002	Nee Thodu Kavali	"Geetham Sangeetham"	Valisha - Sandeep		
2002	Premalo Pavani Kalyan	"O Priya"	Ghantadi Krishna		
2002	Run	"Mounale Elane"	Vidyasagar		Sadhana Sargam
2002	Seema Simham	"Chandamama"	Mani Sharma		Sujatha Mohan
2003	Aadanthe Ado Type	"Chinanavvu Thone"	Yuvan Shankar Raja		
2003	Dhum	"Challa Galiki"	Ramana Gogula		
2003	Dhum	"Challa Galiki"(Bit)	Ramana Gogula		
2003	Dongodu	"Entha Panchesindhi"	Vidyasagar		
2003	Goa	"Edho Cheppalekha"	Krishna Vasa		
2003	Johnny	"Ee Reyi Theeyanidhi"	Ramana Gogula		
2003	Juniors	"Preyasi Manohari"	Chakri		
2003	Kabaddi Kabaddi	"Jaabilli Bugganugilli"	Chakri		
2003	Naaga	"Oka Konte Pillane"	Deva		
2003	Nenu Pelliki Ready	"Nuvvunte Chalu"(Male)	Chakri		
2003	Okkadu	"Attarintiki Ninu"	Mani Sharma		Shreya Ghoshal, Priya Sisters
2003	Pellam Oorelithe	"Dhonda Pandu Lanti"	Mani Sharma		
2003	Pellam Premisthe	"Gunde Gundetho"	Chakri		
2003	Pellamtho Panenti	"Koosindhi Koyila"	S. V. Krishna Reddy		
2003	Pellamtho Panenti	"Okka Nimishamaina"	S. V. Krishna Reddy		
2003	Praanam	"Snehama Swapnama"	Kamalakar		K. S. Chithra
2003	Prema Pandhiri	"Kuhu Kuhu"(Duet)	S. A. Rajkumar		K. S. Chithra
2003	Prema Pandhiri	"Andhamaina"	S. A. Rajkumar		
2003	Premayanamaha	"Gadhilo Madhio"	Ramesh Erra		
2003	Sivamani	"Mona Mona Mona"	Chakri		
2003	Sriramachandrulu	"Paalavellila"	Ghantadi Krishna		
2003	Tagore	"Chinnaga Chinnaga"	Mani Sharma		K. S. Chithra
2003	Vasantham	"Ammo Ammayena"	S. A. Rajkumar		
2003	Vasantham	"Ninu Choodaka"	S. A. Rajkumar		
2003	Vasantham	"Ammo Ammayena"(Bit)	S. A. Rajkumar		
2003	Veede	"Kinnerasani"	Chakri		
2004	Adavi Ramudu	"Jinka Vetaki"	Mani Sharma		K. S. Chithra
2004	Anand	"Yamuna Theeram"	K. M. Radha Krishnan		K. S. Chithra
2004	Anand	"Yadhalo Gaanam"	K. M. Radha Krishnan		K. S. Chithra
2004	Athade Oka Sainyam	"Maa Intiki Ninnu Pilichi"	S. V. Krishna Reddy		
2004	Cheppave Chirugali	"Andhaala Devatha"	S. A. Rajkumar		
2004	Cheppave Chirugali	"Happy New Year"	S. A. Rajkumar		
2004	Cheppave Chirugali	"Paapa Poothota"	S. A. Rajkumar		
2004	Intlo Srimathi Veedhilo Kumari	"Naa Kaatuka Kannullo"	Ghantadi Krishna		
2004	Kaasi	"Ye Bandham Kalipindho"	Sri Kommineni		
2004	Konchem Touchlo Vunte Cheptanu	"Chilipi Kanula Theeyani"	Chakri		
2004	Konchem Touchlo Vunte Cheptanu	"Sarele Sarele"(Duet)	Chakri		
2004	Konchem Touchlo Vunte Cheptanu	"Unnattuga Lenattuga"	Chakri		
2004	Kushi Kushiga	"Theeyani Ee Nijam"	S. A. Rajkumar		
2004	Leela Mahal Center	"O Hampi Bomma"	S. A. Rajkumar		
2004	Love Today	"Walking In The Moon"	Vidyasagar		
2004	Mee Intikosthe Yemistharu Maa Intikosthe Yem Thestharu	"Ee Vela Ee Kalyana"	Ghantadi Krishna		
2004	Naani	"Vastha Nee Venuka"	A. R. Rahman		
2004	Naani	"Naaku Nuvvu Neeku Nenu"	A. R. Rahman		
2004	Shiva Shankar	"Neeti Meedha Kaagithaka"	Ilaiyaraaja		
2004	Shiva Shankar	"Krishna Nuvvu Raaku"	Ilaiyaraaja		K. S. Chithra
2004	Valliddaru Okkate	"Ninne Ninne"	Vandemataram Srinivas		
2004	Vidyardhi	"Virise Prathi Puvvu"	Mani Sharma		
2004	Yagnam	"Thongi Thongi"	Mani Sharma		
2005	Abhimani	"Raaveme Bangaru"	Varikuppala Yadagiri		Shreya Ghoshal
2005	Balu	"Neelo Jarige"	Mani Sharma		Shreya Ghoshal
2005	Bhageeratha	"Evaro Evaro"	Chakri		
2005	Kumkuma	"O Ningi Jabilamma"	Ghantadi Krishna		
2005	Mahanandi	"Yemaina Yedhemaina"	Kamalakar		K. S. Chithra
2005	Pandhem	"Kukku Kukku"	Chakri		
2005	Political Rowdy	"Are Pachi Pachiga"	Sandeep Chowta		
2005	Sankranti	"Andhala Srimathiki"	S. A. Rajkumar		Shreya Ghoshal
2005	Subash Chandra Bose	"Neredu Pallu"	Mani Sharma		Mahalakshmi Iyer
2006	10th Class	"Namaha Namaha"	Mickey J. Meyer		
2006	Ashok	"Jabiliki Vennelanistha"	Mani Sharma		
2006	Asthram	"Sakhiya"(Version ll)	S. A. Rajkumar		
2006	Manasu Palike Mouna Raagam	"Aalapana"	K. M. Radha Krishnan		Shreya Ghoshal
2006	Mayabazar	"Preme Neramouna"	K. M. Radha Krishnan		Shreya Ghoshal
2006	Rajababu	"Vennela Vennela"	S. A. Rajkumar		Sujatha Mohan
2006	Sainikudu	"Aadapilla Aggipulla"	Harris Jayaraj		K. S. Chithra
2006	Sri Ramadasu	"Bhadhra Sheela"	M. M. Keeravani		K. S. Chithra
2006	Stalin	"Siggutho Chi Chi"	Mani Sharma		Sadhana Sargam
2007	Anumanaspadam	"Mallello Illese"	Ilaiyaraaja		
2007	Don	"Neekai Nenu"	Raghava Lawrence		
2007	Guru Kanth	"Ee Haayilo"	A. R. Rahman		Sujatha Mohan
2007	Kotha Katha	"Mandhara Puvvalle"	Ghantadi Krishna		
2007	Nava Vasantham	"Mooga Manase"	S. A. Rajkumar		
2007	Pellaindi Kaani	"Nuvvu Nenuga"	Kamalakar		
2007	Shivaji	"Vaaji Vaaji"	A. R. Rahman		
2008	Bheema	"Paruvapu Vaana"	Harris Jayaraj		
2008	Bheema	"Rahashyapu Kalale"	Harris Jayaraj		
2008	Dasavathaaram	"Raayini Maathram"	Himesh Reshammiya		
2008	Kathanayakudu	"Chele Chele Chele"	G. V. Prakash Kumar		
2008	Keka	"Chitti Chilakavo"	Chakri		
2008	Salute	"Nammara Nestham"	Harris Jayaraj		
2009	Bangaru Babu	"Ningiloni"	M. M. Srilekha		
2009	Kalavaramaye Madilo	"O Nene O Nuvvani"	Sharreth		
2009	Maska	"Aa Vaipunna Ee VaiPunna"	Chakri		
2009	Ninnu Kalisaka	"Andhamaina Andhama"	Sunil Kashyap		
2009	Oy	"Tholisari Nee Deevene"	Yuvan Shankar Raja		
2009	Veedokkade	"Pela Pela"	Harris Jayaraj		
2009	Vidheyudu	"Nidhuralechina"	Sai Karthik		
2009	Villagelo Vinayakudu	"Chinukai Varadhai"	Manikanth Kadri		
2010	Adhurs	"Chandrakala"	Devi Sri Prasad		
2010	Chapter 6	"Beethoven Sangeetham"	Mohan Sithara		
2010	Chethilo Cheyyesi	"Pillanagrovi"	Bunty		
2010	Inkosaari	"Inkosaari"	Mahesh Shankar		
2010	Love To Love	"Cheruve Ayina"	Colonial Cousins		
2010	Ragada	"Shirisha Shirisha"	S. Thaman		
2010	Rambabu Gaadi Pelli	"Good Morning"	Kamalakar		K. S. Chithra, S. P. Sailaja
2010	Rambabu Gaadi Pelli	"Modati Sparsha"	Kamalakar		K. S. Chithra
2010	Robo	"Harima Harima"	A. R. Rahman		
2010	Saradaga Kasepu	"Malle Navvu"	Chakri		
2010	Shambo Shiva Shambo	"Evaremanna Prema"	Sundar C. Babu		
2010	Simha	"Bangaru Konda"	Chakri		
2010	Taj Mahal	"Emantha Neram"	Abhimann Roy		
2011	Naaku O Loverundhi	"Naaku O Loverundhi"	K. M. Radha Krishnan		Sadhana Sargam
2011	Nagaram Nidrapotunna Vela	"Ekkadi Dakka"	Yasho Krishna		
2012	Damarukam	"Reppalapai Reppalapai"	Devi Sri Prasad		K. S. Chithra
2012	Genius	"Om Om Haraha"	Joshua Sridhar		
2012	Ishq	"Sutiga Choodaku"	Aravindh Shankar		
2012	Naalo Nuvvai Neelo Nenai	"Andhamtho"	Sabu John Prince		
2012	Shirdi Sai	"Ramanavami"	M. M. Keeravani		
2012	Thuppakki	"Chinni Chinni"	Harris Jayaraj		
2012	Thuppakki	"Vennelave"	Harris Jayaraj		Bombay Jayashri
2013	Jagadguru Adi Shankara	"Shivoham"	Naga Raju		
2013	Varna	"Raakkaasi"	Harris Jayaraj		
2014	Govindudu Andarivadele	"Neelirangu Chiralona"	Yuvan Shankar Raja		
2014	Shiva Keshav	"Ye Yugalakaina"	Sri Vasanth		
2014	Veta	"Sarigamale Sarigamale"	Chakri		Kousalya
2015	Rudhramadevi	"Avuna Neevena"	Ilaiyaraaja		Sadhana Sargam
2015	Soukhyam	"Naakem Thochadhe"	Anup Rubens		
2016	Policeodu	"Kannullo Unnavu"	G. V. Prakash Kumar		
2016	Soggade Chinni Nayana	"Vasthane Vasthane"	Anup Rubens		Kousalya
2016	Sri Sri	"Enni Janmala Bandhamo"	E S Murthy		
2016	Sri Sri	"Varamulichi Devudu"	E S Murthy		
2017	Lover Boy	"Ala Ala"(Male)	Ashirvad		
2017	C/o Surya	"Sadha Manchikoraku"	D. Imman		
2017	Khaidi No. 150	"You And Me"	Devi Sri Prasad		Shreya Ghoshal
2018	Divya Mani	"Shivoham"	Giridhar Gopal		
2018	Divya Mani	"Neevey Naa Jeevitham"	Giridhar Gopal		Malavika
2018	Saakshyam	"Sapdha Gunakam"	Harshavardhan Rameshwar		
2018	Saakshyam	"Shivam Shivam"	Harshavardhan Rameshwar		
2019	Dev	"Cheliya Adugudhama"	Harris Jayaraj		
2019	Mismatch	"Kannaale Kalalenno"	Oruganti Dharmateja		
2021	Pushpaka Vimanam	"Malli Raava"	Siddharth Sadhasivuni		
2022	Sita Ramam	"Nene Aa Nene"	Vishal Chandrashekhar		K. S. Chithra, Sindhuri
2022	Neetho	"Lalanaa"	Vivek Sagar	Varun Vamsi B	
2023	Ponniyin Selvan: II	"PS Anthem"	A. R. Rahman	Chandrabose	Benny Dayal, Nabyla Maan
2023	Prem Kumar	"Nuvve Leni Lokame"	S Ananth Srikar	Kittu Vissapragada	Yamini Ghantasala
2023	Calling Sahasra	"Merupe Nee Menai"	Mohith Rahmaniac	Suddala Ashok Teja	Harika Narayan
2024	Rathnam	"Yetuvaipo"	Devi Sri Prasad		

== Kannada songs ==
Year	Film	Song	Composer(s)
1997	Kalavida	"Prema Prema"	Hamsalekha
1999	A. K. 47	"Kadalo Kadalo"	Hamsalekha
1999	A. K. 47	"Hey Ram This Is India"	Hamsalekha
1999	O Premave	"Cheluvinoora Chendagathi"	V. Ravichandran
1999	Sparsha	"Ivale Avalu"	Hamsalekha
1999	Sparsha	"Oho Chenne"	Hamsalekha
1999	Suggi	"Hoy Hoy Suggi"	Hamsalekha
1999	Suggi	"Daaya Mado Vinayaka"	Hamsalekha
2000	Devara Maga	"Bharathappa Namma"	Hamsalekha
2000	Naga Devathe	"Naaga Naagi"	Hamsalekha
2000	Preethse	"Sai Sai Preethsai"	Hamsalekha
2000	Preethse	"Yaarittaree Chukki"	Hamsalekha
2000	Preethsu Thappenilla	"Nee Yaarele"	V. Ravichandran
2001	Banallu Neene Bhuviyallu Neene	"Premave Premave"	Prashanth Raj
2001	Hoo Anthiya Uhoo Anthiya	"Baana Kolminchu"	Karthik Raja
2001	Nanna Preethiya Hudugi	"Yaaro Neenu"	Mano Murthy
2001	Nanna Preethiya Hudugi	"Naana Preethiya Hudugi"	Mano Murthy
2001	Premakke Sai	"Olavu Shuruvayitu"	Mani Sharma
2001	Vaalee	"O Sona O Sona"	Rajesh Ramanath
2002	Dhumm	"Mataadu Mathaadu"	Gurukiran
2002	Ekangi	"Nannale Kele Nanna Pranave"	V. Ravichandran
2002	H2O	"Bida Beda Bida Beda"	Sadhu Kokila
2002	Kodanda Rama	"Baalangochi Illade"	V. Ravichandran
2002	Love You	"Edhena Prema"	Gurukiran
2002	Parva	"Elli Hode"	Hamsalekha
2002	Roja	"Moda"	Hamsalekha
2002	Sainika	"Gombe Gombe"	Deva
2002	Sainika	"Soldier Soldier"	Deva
2002	Super Star	"Rajkumar Rajkumar"	Hamsalekha
2002	Super Star	"Thumba Thumba"	Hamsalekha
2003	Laali Haadu	"Dina Belago"	Sadhu Kokila
2003	Heart Beats	"Tangaali"	Venkat Narayan
2003	Kiccha	"Dankanakka"	Hamsalekha
2003	Kiccha	"Karna Kundala"	Hamsalekha
2003	Kiccha	"Meghakke Megha"	Hamsalekha
2003	Chandra Chakori	"Andagaathi Kanna Thumba"	S. A. Rajkumar
2003	Chandra Chakori	"Kuhu Kuhoo Mobile"	S. A. Rajkumar
2003	Game	"Nanna Prithiya"	Babji - Sandeep
2003	Namma Preethiya Ramu	"Nannede Baanali"	Ilaiyaraaja
2003	Namma Preethiya Ramu	"Thegda Marakadidu"	Ilaiyaraaja
2003	Namma Preethiya Ramu	"Joli Joli Jokaaliyalli"	Ilaiyaraaja
2003	Partha	"O Nalle"	Gurukiran
2003	Vijaya Simha	"Oho Priyathama"	Gurukiran
2003	Vijaya Simha	"Idu Yaduvo"	Gurukiran
2004	Y2K	"Ambola Jambola"	Nag - Mahesh
2004	Rama Krishna	"Mugutthi Muthu Chanda"	S. A. Rajkumar
2004	Sarvabhouma	"Karunaadina Koravanngi"	Hamsalekha
2004	Apthamitra	"Kaalavannu Tadeyoru"	Gurukiran
2004	Praana	"Premaa"	Allwyn Fernandes
2004	Omkara	"Bhalo Bhashi Bengalili"	Gurukiran
2004	Sahukara	"Yarilli Ee Tharaha"	Rajesh Ramanath
2004	Santhosha	"Oh My Love"	Stephen Prayog
2004	Santhosha	"Manasella Thumbiruve"	Stephen Prayog
2005	Rakshasa	"Kumbara Madike Maadida"	Sadhu Kokila
2005	Varsha	"Thananana Thananana"	S. A. Rajkumar
2005	Varsha	"Vaasanthi Vaasanthi"	S. A. Rajkumar
2005	Gowramma	"Aakashakke Chappara"	S. A. Rajkumar
2005	Jogi	"Chikubuku Railu"	Gurukiran
2005	Green Signal	"Manasaare Manasaare"	Venkat Narayan
2005	Shambu	"Dheemthananaa"	Ramesh Krishna
2005	Hai Chinnu	"Nanna Kanasina"	Gopi Krishna
2005	Hai Chinnu	"Preethi Solode"	Gopi Krishna
2005	Nammanna	"Chellu Chellu"	Gurukiran
2005	Love Story	"Hagulu Untu Suryanige"	S. A. Rajkumar
2006	O Priyathama	"Avale Nannavalu"	Valisha - Sandeep
2006	My Autograph	"Savi Savi Nenapu"	Bharadwaj
2006	Naaga	"Naati Koli"	Venkat Narayan
2006	Gandugali Kumara Rama	"Sarasake Baaro"	Gurukiran
2006	Sirivantha	"Megha Megha"	S. A. Rajkumar
2007	Ee Preethi Onthara	"Ee Preethi Onthara"	Shameer
2007	Amrutha Vaani	"Manase Helu Manase"	M P Naidu
2007	Anatharu	"Ello Hutti Ello Haridu"	Sadhu Kokila
2007	Krishna	"Hey Hudugi"	V. Harikrishna
2007	Right Adare	"Preethi Preethi"	A M Neel
2007	Preethigaagi	"Kanninalli Kanaside"	S. A. Rajkumar
2007	Preethigaagi	"Ellinda Bande"	S. A. Rajkumar
2008	Gooli	"Jeevana Hudukutha"	Anoop Seelin
2008	Neene Neene	"Kusumari Kusumari"	Sri Murali
2008	Kaamannana Makkalu	"Nanna Kanase"	Vidyasagar
2008	Taj Mahal	"Hoovantha Preethi"	Abhimann Roy
2008	Buddhivantha	"Ravivarmana"	Vijay Antony
2008	Premigaagi Naa	"Neenu Nannavanu"	Rajesh Ramanath
2008	Navagraha	"Naramanasa"	V. Harikrishna
2008	Rocky	"Kareyale Ninna"	Venkat-Narayan
2009	Kempa	"Huva Chelliro"	Gurukiran
2009	Shivamani	"Nee Hinde Bandaga"	Veer Samarth
2009	Seena	"Jeeva Midiyuthide"	AT Raveesh
2009	Dubai Babu	"Baachiko"	V. Sridhar
2009	Karanji	"Ee Thampu Gali"	Veera Samarth
2009	Karanji	"Yaaru Haadada"	Veera Samarth
2009	Kabaddi	"Jhallanta Kaadutaalivalu"	Hamsalekha
2009	Venki	"Helo Geleya"	AM Neel
2009	10th Class A Sec	"Punaha"	R N Abhilash
2009	Devaru Kotta Thangi	"Thangi Madhuve"	Hamsalekha
2010	Bisile	"Ninnanda Nodalande"	Gagan - Hari
2010	Hrudayadhalli Idhenidhu	"Hrudayave Eke Heegade"	Dharma Prakash
2010	Mathe Mungaru	"Belagayitu"	X Paulraj
2010	Olave Vishmaya	"Kaadal Kaadal"(Version ll)	Veer Samarth
2010	Preethiya Theru	"Prema Tharo Romanchana"	Prasad
2011	Hori	"Koghilegu"	Renukumar
2011	Sogasugara	"Manase Ninna Manase"	Rajesh Ramanath
2013	Jatta	"Aarada Ondu Gaya"	Ashley Mendonca & Abhilash Lakra
2014	Aryan	"Nee Barada Dariyalli"	Jassie Gift
2014	Huchudugaru	"Summaniradene"	Joshua Sridhar
2014	Rangan Style	"Khanditha Ninna"	Gurukiran
2017	Upendra Matte Baa	"Premave"	V. Sridhar
2021	Manjra	"Yen Beauty"	Dr. Chinmaya M Rao
2021	Premam Poojyam	"Premam Poojyam"	Raghavendra BS

== Malayalam songs ==
Year	Film	Song	Composer(s)	Co-singer(s)
1996	Azhakiya Ravanan	"Oh Dilruba"	Vidyasagar	K. S. Chithra
1998	Daya	"Neeyen Kaamamohini"	Vishal Bhardwaj	
1998	Sidhartha	"Maayika Yaamam"	Vidyasagar	K. S. Chithra
1999	Garshom	"Parayaan Maranna"(Male)	Ramesh Narayan	
1999	Garshom	"Ethu Kaalaraathrikalkkum"	Ramesh Narayan	
1999	Monisha Ente Monalisa	"Uyire Vaa"	T. Rajendar	
2000	Darling Darling	"Darling Darling"(Version ll)	Ouseppachan	
2000	Darling Darling	"Muthum Pavizhavum"	Ouseppachan	Sujatha Mohan
2000	Sathyam Sivam Sundaram	"Walking In The Moonlight"	Vidyasagar	
2003	Vellithira	"Hridayasakhee"(Male)	Alphons Joseph	
2003	Vellithira	"Hridayasakhee"(Duet)	Alphons Joseph	K. S. Chithra
2004	Quotation	"Hridayaraagamazha"(Duet)	Sabish George	
2004	Quotation	"Hridayaraagamazha"(Male)	Sabish George	
2007	Kaiyoppu	"Venthinkalkkalayude"	Vidyasagar	
2008	Pakal Nakshatrangal	"Pakaruka Nee"	Shahabaz Aman	
2008	Rathri Mazha	"En Nenjile"	Ramesh Narayan	
2009	Angel John	"Thirakkumbol"	Ouseppachan	
2009	Daddy Cool	"Kadhayoru"	Bijibal	
2009	Dr. Patient	"Mazha Njaanarinjirunnilla"	Bennet–Veetraag	
2010	Kadha Thudarunnu	"Aaro Paadunnu"	Ilaiyaraaja	K. S. Chithra
2010	Paattinte Palazhy	"Paattu Paaduvaan"	Dr Suresh Manimala	
2011	Adaminte Makan Abu	"Kinaavinte Minaarathil"(Male)	Ramesh Narayan	
2011	Doubles	"Aaru Nee Arike"	James Vasanthan	
2011	Khaddama	"Vidhuramee"(Duet)	Bennet–Veetraag	Shreya Ghoshal
2011	Khaddama	"Vidhuramee"(Male)	Bennet–Veetraag	
2011	Makaramanju	"Aah Ko Chaahiye"	Ramesh Narayan	
2011	Makaramanju	"Kaanuvaan Ere Vaiki"	Ramesh Narayan	
2011	Mohabbath	"Atharu Peyyana"	S. Balakrishnan	
2011	Mohabbath	"Thennalin Kaikal"	S. Balakrishnan	
2011	Mohabbath	"Atharu Peyyana"(Version 2)	S. Balakrishnan	
2011	Snehaveedu	"Amruthamaayi Abhayamaai"	Ilaiyaraaja	
2012	Father's Day	"Aarude Nashta Pranayathin"	M. G. Sreekumar	
2012	Njanum Ente Familiyum	"Akale Karimukilo"	M. G. Sreekumar	
2012	Puthiya Theerangal	"Maarppeelikkaatte"	Ilaiyaraaja	
2014	Vellivelichathi	"Bajo Shahnayi"	Deepankuran	
2015	Anarkali	"Sahibaa"	Vidyasagar	
2015	Pathemari	"Padiyirangunnu"	Bijibal	
2016	Kattumakkan	"Thaalam Puthumazha"	Murali Guruvayoor	
2017	Hadiyya	"Surumayil Neela Kanpeeli"	Sharreth	
2018	Ankaraajyathe Jimmanmaar	"Nenchin Ninave"(Male)	Girish Surya Narayan	
2018	Ankaraajyathe Jimmanmaar	"Nenchin Ninave"(Duet)	Girish Surya Narayan	
2023	RDX: Robert Dony Xavier	"Veyilinte Punjiri"	Sam C. S.	
2024	Marivillin Gopurangal	"Manam Manam"	Vidyasagar	

== Marathi songs ==
Year	Film	Song	Composer(s)	Co-singer(s)
2005	Sarivar Sari	"Saanjh Jhali Tari"(Male)	Bhaskar Chandavarkar	Solo
2009	Gaiir	"Ye Na Mithit Mazya"	Avinash - Vishwajeet	Solo
2009	Jogwa	"Jeev Rangla"	Ajay–Atul	Shreya Ghoshal
2011	Aataa Ga Baya	"Sajvun Saanjh Ashi"	Ajay–Atul	Mahalakshmi Iyer
2011	Hello Jai Hind!	"Ganjyaleela"	Ilaiyaraaja	Solo
2012	Jagran	"Manaranjani"	Adi Ramchandra	Solo
2012	Kashala Udyachi Baat	"Man Vede"	Salil Kulkarni	Shankar Mahadevan
2012	Kashala Udyachi Baat	"Man Vede"(Reprise)	Salil Kulkarni	Shankar Mahadevan
2012	Shyamache Vadil	"Saare Punha Athwe"	Soham Pathak	Solo
2012	Tukaram	"Korad Aabhal"	Ashok Patki	Solo
2013	Rannbhoomi	"Wyatha Aganit Suyancha"	Saii-Piyush	
2013	Are Avaaj Konacha	"Re Swami Raya"	Shailendra Barve	
2013	Kokanastha	"Majhya Savve"	Akshya Hariharan	Sadhana Sargam
2013	Kokanastha	"Aga Pawna Ye Aata"	Akshya Hariharan	
2013	Kokanastha	"Maha Mrityunjaya"	Akshya Hariharan	
2013	Shrimant Morya	"Ganesh Gaakar Stotram"	Various	
2014	Andolan Ek Suruvat Ek Shevat	"Jiv Tutato"	Harshit Abhiraj	
2014	Postcard	"Nili Shai"	Gandhaar	
2014	Miss Match	"Bolna"	Neeraj	
2015	3:56 Killari	"Tu Ekaki"	Chinar - Mahesh	
2015	Online Binline	"Oho Kai Zhala"	Lesle Lewis	
2016	Ghantaa	"Unbreakable"	Samir Saptiskar	Shannon Donald
2017	Aarti - The Unknown Love Story	"Man Bavare"	Prashanth Satose, Sujit - Tejas	Deepali Sathe
2018	Mol	"Ek Ajeebsa Khalipan"	Shyam Kshirsagar	
2020	Tattaad	"Bhidal Bhidal"	Rohit Nagbhide	
2020	Prawaas	"Kaun Hain Hum"	Salim–Sulaiman	
2021	Jivan Sandhya	"Aaj Punha Navyane"	Dhananjay Dhumal	
2023	Aani Baani	"Aas Lagali"	Pankajj Padghan	Sayali Pankajj

== Bengali Songs ==
Year	Film	Song	Composer(s)	Writer(s)	Co-artist(s)
1999	Swapna Niye	"Konodin Bujhi"	Ajoy Chakrabarty	Bishnu Pal Chowdhary	Solo
2000	Single (non-film)	"Jono Gono Mono"	Rabindranath Tagore		Lata Mangeshkar, Kavita Krishnamurthy, P. Unnikrishnan, Asha Bhosle, S. P. Balasubrahmanyam, Kaushiki Chakraborty, Bhimsen Joshi
2005	Parinam	"Poth Bhola"	Babul Bose		solo

== Odia Songs ==
Year	Film	Song	Composer(s)	Co-artist(s)
1983	Abhilasha	"Ei Jhuma Jhuma"	Saroj Patnaik	Arati Mukherjee
1994	Gopare Badhuchi Kala Kanhei	"Gopare Badhuchi Kala Kanhei"	Bachu Mukherjee	Sadhana Sargam

== Bhojpuri Songs ==
Year	Film	Song	Composer(s)	Co-artist(s)
2006	Humka Aisa Waisa Na Samjha	"Bada Neek Baate Hamar Gaon"		

== Sinhala Songs ==
Year	Song	Composer(s)	Co-artist(s)
2009	"Yalpaname"	Bathiya and Santhush	Randhir Witana
