= List of songs recorded by KK =

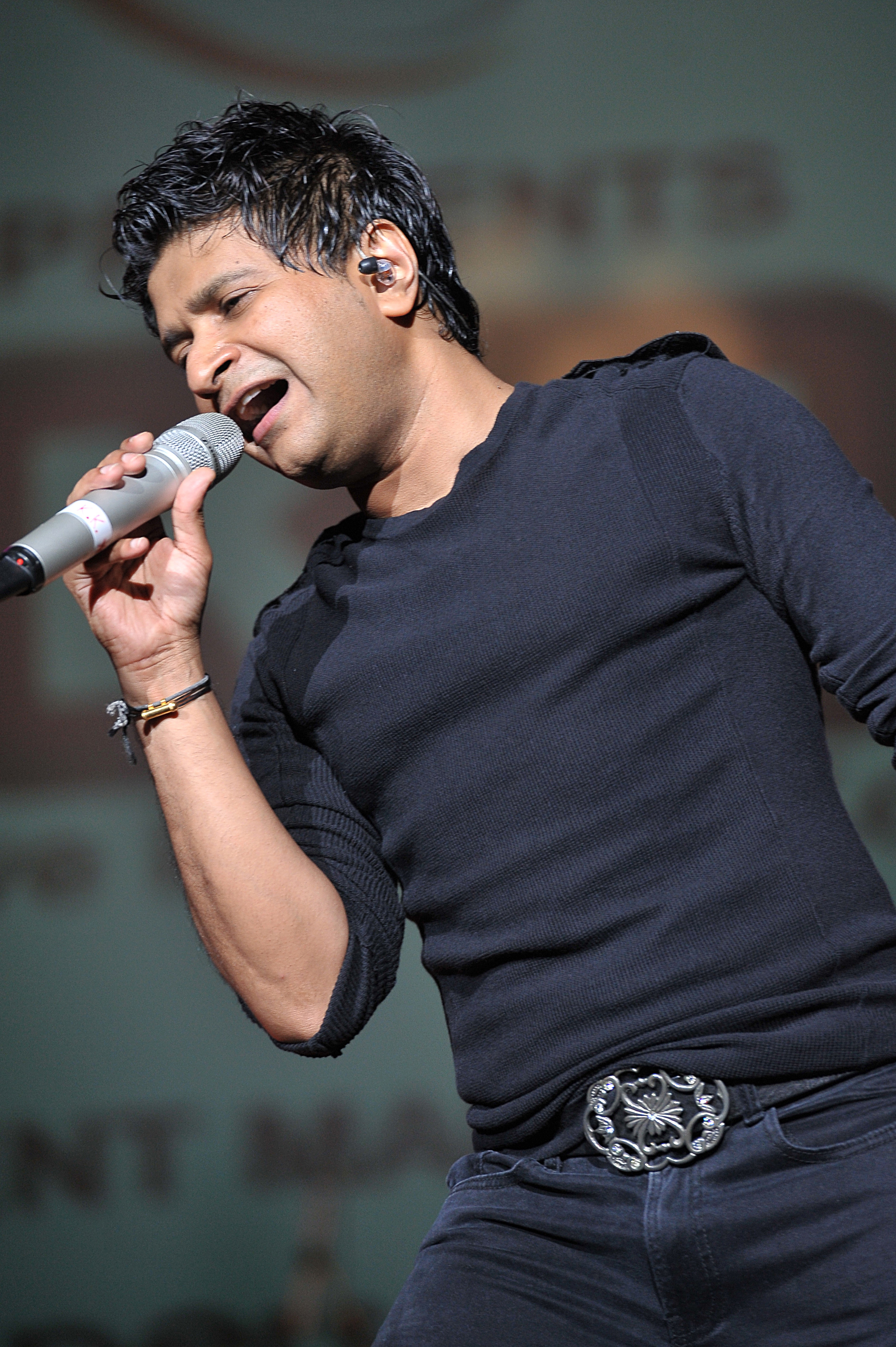
KK performing live at The Jockey Club Auditorium, Hong Kong

KK (1968–2022) was an Indian playback singer. His music features in Hindi, Tamil, Telugu, Kannada, Malayalam, Marathi, Bengali and Gujarati language films.

== Hindi Songs ==
=== 1996 ===
Film	Song	Composer(s)	Lyrics Writer(s)	Co-singer(s)	Ref.
Maachis	"Chhod Aaye Hum"	Vishal Bharadwaj	Gulzar	Hariharan, Suresh Wadkar, Vinod Sehgal	
Duniya Dilwalon Ki (Dubbed version)	"College Ke Saathi"	A. R. Rahman		Hariharan, Aslam Mustafa	
Duniya Dilwalon Ki (Dubbed version)	"Hello Doctor"	A. R. Rahman		Storms, Noel James	

=== 1997 ===
Film	Song	Composer(s)	Writer(s)	Co-singer(s)	Ref.
Betaabi	"Jhoothi Moothi"	Vishal Bhardwaj	Sameer	Suresh Wadkar, Devaki Pandit	
Sapnay	"Strawberry Aankhen"	A. R. Rahman	Javed Akhtar	Kavita Paudwal	

=== 1999 ===
Film	Song	Composer(s)	Writer(s)	Co-singer(s)	Ref.
Hum Dil De Chuke Sanam	"Kaipoche"	Ismail Darbar	Mehboob Kotwal	Shankar Mahadevan, Jyotsna Hardikar, Damayanti Bardai	
Hum Dil De Chuke Sanam	"Tadap Tadap"	Ismail Darbar	Mehboob Kotwal	Dominique Cerejo	
Pyaar Mein Kabhi Kabhi	"Koi To Mujhe Bata De"	Salim–Sulaiman	Salim Bijnori, Raj Kaushal	Jeanne Michael, Salim Merchant	
Pyaar Mein Kabhi Kabhi	"Lakhon Deewane"	Vishal-Shiraz-Samrat	Vishal Dadlani		
Pyaar Mein Kabhi Kabhi	"Pyar Mein Kabhi Kabhi"	Vishal–Shekhar	Vishal Dadlani		
Rockford	"Yaaron"	Lesle Lewis	Mehboob Kotwal		

=== 2000 ===
Film	Song	Composer(s)	Writer(s)	Co-singer(s)	Ref.
Dhai Akshar Prem Ke	"O Mere Rabba"	Jatin–Lalit	Sameer	Anuradha Paudwal	
Dil Pe Mat Le Yaar	"Haule Haule"	Vishal Bhardwaj	Abbas Tyrewala		
Har Dil Jo Pyar Karega	"Sahiba Sahiba"	Anu Malik	Sameer		
Hera Pheri	"Jab Bhi Koi Haseena"	Anu Malik	Sameer		
Ghaath	"Jo Dar Gaya Wo Mar Gaya"	Anu Malik	Sameer	Shaan, Anu Malik	

=== 2001 ===
Film	Song	Composer(s)	Writer(s)	Co-singer(s)	Ref.
Aks	"Aaja Gufaon Mein Aa"	Anu Malik	Gulzar	Vasundhara Das	
Aks	"Banda Bindas"	Anu Malik	Gulzar	Clinton Cerejo, Kunal Ganjawala	
Bas Itna Sa Khwaab Hai	"Chhota Sa Mann Hai"	Aadesh Shrivastava	Goldie Behl, Mona Alvi	Alka Yagnik, Roopkumar Rathod	
Deewaanapan	"Doston Naam Karna Hai"	Aadesh Shrivastava	Sameer	Shaan, Hema Sardesai, Shraddha Pandit	
Deewaanapan	"Hum Deewane"	Aadesh Shrivastava	Sameer	Shaan, Hema Sardesai	
Dil Chahta Hai	"Koi Kahe Kehta Rahe"	Shankar–Ehsaan–Loy	Javed Akhtar	Shankar Mahadevan, Shaan	
Ehsaas: The Feeling	"Tumse Milkar Hua Hai Ehsaas"	Anand Raaj Anand	Praveen Bharadwaj	Bela Shende	
Farz	"Jhanak Jhanak Baaje"	Aadesh Shrivastava	Sameer	Sunidhi Chauhan, Richa Sharma	
Lajja	"Jiyo Jiyo"	Anu Malik	Sameer		
Love Ke Liye Kuch Bhi Karega	"Dhan Dhan"	Vishal Bhardwaj	Abbas Tyrewala		
Love Ke Liye Kuch Bhi Karega	"Socho Kya Karogi"	Vishal Bhardwaj	Abbas Tyrewala	Asha Bhosle	
Mujhe Kucch Kehna Hai	"Mujhe Kucch Kehna Hai"	Anu Malik	Sameer		
Mujhe Kucch Kehna Hai	"Pyaar Re"	Anu Malik	Sameer		
Rehnaa Hai Terre Dil Mein	"Sach Keh Raha Hai"	Harris Jayaraj	Sameer		
Rehnaa Hai Terre Dil Mein	"Na Sone Ke Bangle Mein"	A.M.M.	Sameer	Anuradha Sriram	
Style	"Miss Dil & Mr. Dil"	Nitin Raikwar	Nitin Raikwar	Hema Sardesai	
Style	"Yeh Hai Style"	Sanjeev–Darshan	Tejpal Kaur	Abhijeet	
Taj Mahal – A Monument Of Love	"Taj Mahal Ki Ba Zabaani" (Version 1)	Santosh Nair	Rahul B. Seth	Sunidhi Chauhan	
Taj Mahal – A Monument Of Love	"Taj Mahal Ki Ba Zabaani" (Version 2)	Santosh Nair	Rahul B. Seth	Sunidhi Chauhan	
Taj Mahal – A Monument Of Love	"Aye Khuda"	Santosh Nair	Rahul B. Seth	Roop Kumar Rathod	
Yaadein	"Aye Dil Dil Ki Duniya Mein"	Anu Malik	Anand Bakshi	Udit Narayan, Sneha Pant	
Yeh Teraa Ghar Yeh Meraa Ghar	"Mil Jaye Khazana"	Anand–Milind	Ibrahim Ashk	Shaan	
Tere Liye	"Tere Liye" (Sad Version)	Jeet-Pritam	Abbas Tyrewala	Sonu Nigam	
Tere Liye	"Jee Lenge"	Jeet-Pritam	Abbas Tyrewala	Kavita Krishnamurthy, Sonu Nigam	

=== 2002 ===
Film	Song	Composer(s)	Writer(s)	Co-singer(s)	Ref.
16 December	"Dil Yeh Tera"	Vikesh Mehta	P.K.Mishra		
Aap Mujhe Achche Lagne Lage	"Meri Jaan"	Rajesh Roshan	Dev Kohli	Alka Yagnik	
Aap Mujhe Achche Lagne Lage	"We Wish You"	Rajesh Roshan	Dev Kohli	Alka Yagnik, Jack Gaud	
Agni Varsha	"Dole Re"	Sandesh Shandilya	Javed Akhtar	K. S. Chithra	
Ansh	"Mumbai Mein"	Nadeem–Shravan	Sameer	Hozef, Tauseef Akhtar, Shaan	
Badhaai Ho Badhaai	"Teri Zindagi Mein Pyar Hai" (Version 1)	Anu Malik	Javed Akhtar	Alka Yagnik	
Badhaai Ho Badhaai	"Teri Zindagi Mein Pyar Hai" (Version 3)	Anu Malik	Javed Akhtar		
Chhal	"Chhal"	Viju Shah	Amitabh Verma		
Chhal	"Chhal" (Extended Mix Version)	Viju Shah	Amitabh Verma		
Deewangee	"Deewangee"	Ismail Darbar	Nusrat Badr	Mahalakshmi Iyer	
Devdas	"Dola Re Dola"	Ismail Darbar	Nusrat Badr	Shreya Ghoshal, Kavita Krishnamurti	
Devdas	"Maar Dala"	Ismail Darbar	Nusrat Badr, Prakash Kapadia	Kavita Krishnamurthy	
Encounter: The Killing	"Jhum Jhum"	Amar Mohile, Arun Paudwal	N/A		
Encounter: The Killing	"Prashna Chinha"	Amar Mohile, Arun Paudwal	N/A		
Filhaal...	"Naya Naya"	Anu Malik	Gulzar	K.S. Chitra	
Ghaav: The Wound	"Maane Ya Na Maane"	Suresh Raheja	Arun Bhairav	Sapna Mukherjee	
Humraaz	"Bardaasht" (Version 1)	Himesh Reshammiya	Sudhakar Sharma	Sunidhi Chauhan	
Humraaz	"Bardaasht" (Version 2)	Himesh Reshammiya	Sudhakar Sharma		
Jeena Sirf Merre Liye	"Kash Ke Tujhse Main"	Nadeem–Shravan	Sameer	Alka Yagnik	
Kitne Door Kitne Paas	"Rulati Hain Mohabbatein"	Sanjeev–Darshan	Anwar Sagar		
Kuch Tum Kaho Kuch Hum Kahein	"Yeh Kya Majboori Hai"	Anu Malik	Sameer	Prashant	
Kya Yehi Pyaar Hai	"Dil Pe Chaane Laga"	Sajid–Wajid	Jalees Sherwani	Sunidhi Chauhan	
Leela	"Kanha Tere Bansuri"	Shantanu Moitra	Abbas Tyrewala	Falguni Pathak, Karsan Sagathia	
Mere Yaar Ki Shaadi Hai	"Hum Dono Jaisa"	Jeet-Pritam	Javed Akhtar	Sunidhi Chauhan	
Om Jai Jagadish	"Om Jai Jagadish" (Version 1)	Anu Malik	Sameer	Abhijeet, Hariharan, Alka Yagnik	
Om Jai Jagadish	"Om Jai Jagadish" (Version 2)	Anu Malik	Sameer	Abhijeet, Hariharan, Alka Yagnik	
Om Jai Jagadish	"Jeena Kya"	Anu Malik	Sameer		
Road	"Toofan Se"	Nitin Raikwar	Nitin Raikwar	Sunidhi Chauhan	
Saathiya	"Mangalyam"	A. R. Rahman	Gulzar	Shaan, Kunal Ganjawala, Srinivas	
Saathiya	"O Humdum Suniyo Re"	A. R. Rahman	Gulzar	Shaan, Kunal Ganjawala	
Shararat	"Mehki Hawaon Mein"	Sajid–Wajid	Sameer	Sonu Nigam	
Soch	"Dil Dhoonde"	Jatin–Lalit	Sameer	Asha Bhosle	
Yeh Kya Ho Raha Hai?	"Ooh Yeh!"	Shankar–Ehsaan–Loy	Javed Akhtar	Mahalakshmi Iyer	
Om	"Dil Diya Hai Tujhe"	Amar Mohile	Sameer Anjaan	Hema Sardesai	R

=== 2003 ===
Film	Song	Composer(s)	Writer(s)	Co-singer(s)	Ref.
Bas Yun Hi	"Ek Ajnabi"	Rajeev-Merlin	Subha		
Bas Yun Hi	"Bas Yun Hi"	Rajeev-Merlin	Subha		
Bas Yun Hi	"Ehsaas"	Rajeev-Merlin	Subha	Mahalakshmi Iyer	
Bas Yun Hi	"Jao Naa"	Rajeev-Merlin	Subha	Mahalakshmi Iyer	
Chupke Se	"Jeele Jeele"	Vishal Bhardwaj	Gulzar	Alka Yagnik, Ranjit Barot	
Ek Aur Ek Gyarah	"Beimaan Mohabbat"	Shankar–Ehsaan–Loy	Sameer	Shankar Mahadevan, Gayatri Ganjawala	
Footpath	"Soorat Pe Teri Pyar Aave"	Himesh Reshammiya	Sameer	Hema Sardesai, Jayesh Gandhi	
Freaky Chakra	"Dil Main Kuch Ho Raha Hai"	Ouseppachan	Shiven Surendranath, Roohi Dixit		
Freaky Chakra	"Freaky Chakra Title Song"	Ouseppachan	Shiven Surendranath, Roohi Dixit	Ouseppachan, Ziba Bhagwagar, Ashvin Naidu, Venugopal, Franco Seven	
Fun 2shh	"Hold"	Pritam	Amitabh Verma	Shaan, Sunidhi Chauhan	
Jhankaar Beats	"Jab Kabhi"	Vishal–Shekhar	Vishal Dadlani	Mahalakshmi Iyer	
Jhankaar Beats	"Jo Gaya Woh Gaya"	Vishal–Shekhar	Vishal Dadlani	Vishal Dadlani	
Jhankaar Beats	"Humein Tumse Pyar Kitna"	Vishal–Shekhar	Vishal Dadlani		
Jhankaar Beats	"Tu Aashiqui Hai"	Vishal–Shekhar	Vishal Dadlani		
Jism	"Awaarapan Banjarapan"	M. M. Kreem	Sayeed Quadri		
Indian Babu	"I Wanna Take You"	Nadeem-Shravan	Sameer		
Kal Ho Naa Ho	"It's The Time To Disco"	Shankar–Ehsaan–Loy	Javed Akhtar	Vasundhara Das, Shaan, Loy Mendonsa	
Khushi	"Hai Re Hai Re"	Anu Malik	Sameer	Hema Sardesai	
Khwahish	"Jaan-E-Man"	Milind Sagar	Faaiz Anwar	Asha Bhosle	
Kucch To Hai	"Aisa Kyon Hota Hai"	Anu Malik	Sameer	Sunidhi Chauhan	
Kucch To Hai	"Ding Dong"	Anu Malik	Sameer	Sunidhi Chauhan	
Kyon?	"Tadak Tadak"	Bhupen Hazarika	Prasoon Joshi	Dominique Cerejo, Sonu Nigam, KK	
Kyon?	"Aise Koi Jata Hai"	Bhupen Hazarika	Prasoon Joshi		
Kyon?	"Sun Le Saara Jahaan"	Bhupen Hazarika	Prasoon Joshi		
Main Prem Ki Diwani Hoon	"Ladka Yeh Kehta Hai"	Anu Malik	Dev Kohli		
Main Prem Ki Diwani Hoon	"Chali Aayee"	Anu Malik	Dev Kohli	K. S. Chithra	
Main Prem Ki Diwani Hoon	"O Ajnabi" (Happy Version)	Anu Malik	Dev Kohli	K. S. Chithra	
Main Prem Ki Diwani Hoon	"Sanjana I Love You"	Anu Malik	Dev Kohli	K. S. Chithra	
Main Prem Ki Diwani Hoon	"Prem! Prem! Prem!"	Anu Malik	Dev Kohli	K. S. Chithra	
Miss India	"Sun Sun"	Anand–Milind	Jalees Sherwani	Sowmya Raoh	
Mumbai Matinee	"Sex Is Good"	Farhad Wadia	Farhad Wadia	Farhad Wadia	
Oops!	"Bhadka De"	Ravi Pawar	Ajay Jhingran	Sunidhi Chauhan	
Oops!	"Bhadka De" (Sad Version)	Ravi Pawar	Ajay Jhingran		
Paanch	"Main Khuda"	Vishal Bhardwaj	Abbas Tyrewala		
Paanch	Pakka Mat	Vishal Bhardwaj	Abbas Tyrewala		
Rules: Pyaar Ka Superhit Formula	"Uljhano Ko De Diya"	Sandesh Shandilya	Subrat Sinha, R.N. Dubey	Sanjivani	
Saaya	"Kabhi Khushboo"	Anu Malik	Sayeed Quadri		
Stumped	"Sona Chandi"	Pritam	Anil Bhardwaj		
Stumped	"Aise Hi Bada Hua Gavaskar"	Pritam	Gaurav Pandey	Shaan, Aanjjan Srivastav	
Stumped	"Humko Toh Hai Poora Yakeen"	Pritam	Abbas Tyrewala	Sunidhi Chauhan, Sagarika, Shankar Mahadevan, Shraddha Pandit, Shubha Mudgal, Shweta Pandit, Shweta Shetty, Sudesh Bhosale	
Stumped	"Humko Toh Hai Poora Yakeen" (Remix Version)	Pritam	Abbas Tyrewala	Sunidhi Chauhan, Sudesh Bhosale	
Supari	"Bombay Town"	Vishal–Shekhar	Javed Akhtar		
Tere Naam	"O Jaana"	Himesh Reshammiya	Sameer	Udit Narayan, Alka Yagnik, Shaan, Kamaal Khan	
Zameen	"Dilli Ki Sardi"	Himesh Reshammiya	Sameer	Shweta Shetty	
Zameen	"Dilli Ki Sardi" (Remix Version)	Himesh Reshammiya	Sameer	Shweta Shetty	
Zameen	"Tere Sang Ek Simple Si Coffee"	Himesh Reshammiya	Sameer	Hema Sardesai	
Zameen	"Sarzameen Se"	Himesh Reshammiya	Sameer	Shaan	
Valentine Days	"Jeena Jeena"	Jayanta Pathak	Roop Johari	Zubeen Garg, Mehnaaz	

=== 2004 ===
Film	Song	Composer(s)	Writer(s)	Co-singer(s)	Ref.
Alibaba Aur 40 Chor	"Sher Agar Aa Jaye"	Anand–Milind	Jalees Sherwani		
Aabra Ka Daabra	"Love Hoya"	Himesh Reshammiya	Sameer	Hema Sardesai	
Aitraaz	"Yeh Dil Tumpe Aa Gaya"	Himesh Reshammiya	Sameer	Alisha Chinai	
Asambhav	"Main Sada Hoon"	Viju Shah	Sameer		
Dhoom	"Shikdum" (The Bedroom Mix Version)	Pritam	Sameer	Gayatri Ganjawala, Indee	
Dil Maange More	"O Makhna Ve"	Himesh Reshammiya	Sameer	Sunidhi Chauhan	
Dil Ne Jise Apna Kahaa	"Go Balle Balle"	Himesh Reshammiya	Sameer	Alisha Chinai	
Inteqam: The Perfect Game	"Ishq Sarfira"	Anand–Milind	Jalees-Rashid	Sadhna Sargam	
Ishq Hai Tumse	"Lutf De Gayee"	Himesh Reshammiya	Sameer	Hema Sardesai	
King of Bollywood	"Dhak Dhak"	Smoke	Piyush Jha		
Main Hoon Na	"Chale Jaise Hawaien"	Anu Malik	Javed Akhtar	Vasundhara Das	
Main Hoon Na	"Ye Fizaein"	Anu Malik	Javed Akhtar	Alka Yagnik	
Main Hoon Na	"Gori Gori"	Anu Malik	Javed Akhtar	Shreya Ghoshal, Anu Malik, Sunidhi Chauhan	
Musafir	"Door Se Paas"	Vishal–Shekhar	Dev Kohli		
Popcorn Khao! Mast Ho Jao	"Le Chale"	Vishal–Shekhar		Mahalakshmi Iyer	
Rudraksh	"Dil Ki Aahein"	Shashi Pritam	Mast Ali	K. S. Chithra	
Rakht	"Rakht"	Shamir Tandon	Sandeep Nath	Mahesh Manjrekar	
Shaadi Ka Laddoo	"Biwi Ka Belan"	Vishal–Shekhar	Vishal Dadlani	Shaan	
Shukriya: Till Death Do Us Apart	"Aankhon Aankhon Mein"	Vishal–Shekhar	Sameer	Sunidhi Chauhan	
Silence Please... The Dressing Room	"Phir Se Khelenge"	Jawahar Wattal	Anmol Saxena		
Taarzan: The Wonder Car	"O Lala Re"	Himesh Reshammiya	Sameer	Alka Yagnik	
Thoda Tum Badlo Thoda Hum	"No Tension"	Amar Mohile	Nida Fazli		
Thoda Tum Badlo Thoda Hum	"Uff Yuh Ma"	Amar Mohile	Nida Fazli	Asha Bhosle	
Uuf Kya Jaadoo Mohabbat Hai	"Dekar Dil"	Sandesh Shandilya	Mehboob Kotwal	Vinod Rathod, Sunidhi Chauhan, Runa	
Hum Jo Kehna Paaye	"Dil Ko Kabhi Na Roko"	Uttam Singh			
Hum Jo Kehna Paaye	"Kya Hai Mohabbat"	Uttam Singh		Shreya Ghoshal	
Hum Jo Kehna Paaye	"Hum Jo Kehna Paaye"	Uttam Singh		Shankar Mahadevan	

=== 2005 ===
Film	Song	Composer(s)	Writer(s)	Co-singer(s)	Ref.
Aashiq Banaya Aapne	"Dilnashin Dilnashin"	Himesh Reshammiya	Sameer		
Aashiq Banaya Aapne	"Dilnashin Dilnashin" (Remix Version)	Himesh Reshammiya	Sameer		
Anjaane	"Soni Re"	Himesh Reshammiya	Sameer	Sapna Mukherjee	
Chocolate	"Zahreeli Raatein"	Pritam	Sameer	Sapna Mukherjee	Praveen Bharadwaj
Dus	"Dus Bahane"	Vishal–Shekhar	Panchhi Jalonvi	Shaan	
Ek Ajnabee	"Soniye"	Amar Mohile	Sameer	Sunidhi Chauhan	
Ek Ajnabee	"Soniye" (Mix N Match Remix)	Amar Mohile	Sameer	Sunidhi Chauhan	
Elaan	"Dil Mein Hulchul"	Anu Malik	Sameer	Sunidhi Chauhan	
Garam Masala	"Dill Samander"	Pritam	Sameer	Sunidhi Chauhan	
Home Delivery	"Chand Ki Roshni"	Vishal–Shekhar	Vishal Dadlani		
Iqbal	"Aashayein" (Slow Version)	Salim–Sulaiman	Irfan Siddiqui		
Iqbal	"Aashayein"	Salim–Sulaiman	Irfan Siddiqui	Salim Merchant	
Iqbal	"Mutthi Mein Aasman"	Kedar-Sarosh	Vimal Kashyap		
Jackpot	"Mehbooba"	Dhrubajyoti Phukan	Sham Balkan	Shreya Ghoshal	
Jurm	"Rabba Rabba"	Anand Raaj Anand	Dev Kohli	Gayatri Ganjawala	
Kyaa Kool Hai Hum	"Kyaa Kool Hai Hum"	Anu Malik	Sameer	Kunal Ganjawala, Anu Malik	
Kyaa Kool Hai Hum	"Kyaa Kool Hai Hum" (Remix Version)	Anu Malik	Sameer	Kunal Ganjawala, Anu Malik	
Mumbai Xpress	"Aila Re" (Version 1)	Ilaiyaraaja	Dev Kohli	Sunidhi Chauhan, Sonu Nigam, Shreya Ghoshal, Shaan	
Mumbai Xpress	"Aila Re" (Version 2)	Ilaiyaraaja	Dev Kohli	Sunidhi Chauhan, Sonu Nigam, Shreya Ghoshal, Shaan	
Mumbai Xpress	"Bander Ki Dug Dugi"	Ilaiyaraaja	Dev Kohli	Sunidhi Chauhan, Sonu Nigam, Shaan	
My Brother…Nikhil	"Le Chale"	Vivek Philip	Amitabh Verma		
Nazar	"Nazar Nazar"	Anu Malik	Sayeed Quadri		
Nazar	"Nazar Nazar" (Remix Version)	Anu Malik	Sayeed Quadri		
Neal 'n' Nikki	"Neal ‘n’ Nikki"	Salim–Sulaiman	Anvita Dutt Guptan	Shweta Pandit	
Neal 'n' Nikki	"N 'n' N" (The Naughty Mix Version)	Salim–Sulaiman	Anvita Dutt Guptan	Shweta Pandit	
No Entry	"Ishq Mein"	Anu Malik	Sameer	Alisha Chinai	
No Entry	"Dil Paagal Hai"	Anu Malik	Sameer	Kumar Sanu, Alka Yagnik	
Padmashree Laloo Prasad Yadav	"Padmashree Laloo Prasad Yadav"	Nitin Raikwar	Nitin Raikwar	Vinod Rathod, Nitin Raikwar	
Rog	"Guzar Na Jaye"	M.M. Kreem	Neelesh Misra	Shreya Ghoshal	
Rog	"Maine Dil Se Kaha"	M.M. Kreem	Neelesh Misra		
Rog	"Tere Is Jahan Mein"	M.M. Kreem	Sayeed Quadri		
Sauda: The Deal	"Dhuaan"	Anand–Milind	Praveen Bharadwaj	Sapna Awasthi	
Shikhar	"Fitna Dil"	Viju Shah	Chandrashekhar Rajit	Sunidhi Chauhan, Udit Narayan	
Shikhar	"Fitna Dil" (Remix Version)	Viju Shah	Chandrashekhar Rajit	Sunidhi Chauhan, Udit Narayan	
Shikhar	"Dheere Dheere"	Viju Shah	Manohar Iyer		
Socha Na Tha	"Main Seedhey Saade Dhang Se"	Sandesh Shandilya	Irshad Kamil		
Tezaab – The Acid of Love	"Kaash Yeh Pyar Na Hota"	Roop Kumar Rathod	Shakeel Azmi		
U, Bomsi n Me	"Halki Halki"	Deepak Pandit	Manoj Muntashir		
Vaah! Life Ho Toh Aisi!	"Teri Yaad...Yaad"	Himesh Reshammiya	Sameer	Jayesh Gandhi	
Vaah! Life Ho Toh Aisi!	"Teri Yaad...Yaad" (Remix Version)	Himesh Reshammiya	Sameer	Jayesh Gandhi	
Zeher	"Aye Bekhabar"	Roop Kumar Rathod	Shakeel Azmi		

=== 2006 ===
Film	Song	Composer(s)	Writer(s)	Co-singer(s)	Ref.
Aap Ki Khatir	"I Love You for What You Are"	Himesh Reshammiya	Sameer	Alisha Chinai, Kunal Ganjawala, Jayesh Gandhi	
Aap Ki Khatir	"I Love You for What You Are" (Remix Version)	Himesh Reshammiya	Sameer	Alisha Chinai, Kunal Ganjawala, Jayesh Gandhi	
Ahista Ahista	"Ishq Ne Tere"	Himesh Reshammiya	Irshad Kamil	Jayesh Gandhi	
Ahista Ahista	"Ishq Ne Tere" (Remix Version)	Himesh Reshammiya	Irshad Kamil	Jayesh Gandhi	
Ahista Ahista	"Tanha Tere Bagair"	Himesh Reshammiya	Irshad Kamil	Sunidhi Chauhan	
Ahista Ahista	"Tanha Tere Bagair" (Remix Version)	Himesh Reshammiya	Irshad Kamil	Sunidhi Chauhan	
Aksar	"Soniye"	Himesh Reshammiya	Sameer	Sunidhi Chauhan	
Aksar	"Soniye" (Remix Version)	Himesh Reshammiya	Sameer	Sunidhi Chauhan	
Anthony Kaun Hai?	"No Way! No Way!"	Himesh Reshammiya	Sameer	Himesh Reshammiya	
Anthony Kaun Hai?	"No Way! No Way!" (Remix Version)	Himesh Reshammiya	Sameer	Himesh Reshammiya	
Ankahee	"Ek Pal Ke Liye"	Pritam	Amitabh Verma		
Aparichit - The Stranger	"Chori Hai"	Harris Jayaraj	Mehboob Kotwal	Shreya Ghoshal	
Bas Ek Pal	"Bas Ek Pal"	Mithoon	Amitabh Verma	Dominique Cerejo	
Bas Ek Pal	"Bas Ek Pal" (Remix Version)	Mithoon	Amitabh Verma	Dominique Cerejo	
Bas Ek Pal	"Zindagi Hosh Main"	Vivek Philip	Amitabh Verma	Zubeen Garg	
Bas Ek Pal	"Ashq Bhi Muskuraye"	Vivek Philip	Amitabh Verma	Sunidhi Chauhan	
Bas Ek Pal	"Dheemey Dheemey"	Vivek Philip	Amitabh Verma	Sunidhi Chauhan	
Bas Ek Pal	"Hai Ishq Ye Kya Ek Khata"	Pritam	Amitabh Verma	Sunidhi Chauhan	
Bhagam Bhag	"Afreen"	Pritam	Sameer	Sunidhi Chauhan	
Bhagam Bhag	"Afreen" (Remix Version)	Pritam	Sameer	Sunidhi Chauhan	
Chup Chup Ke	"Ghoomar"	Himesh Reshammiya	Sameer	Sunidhi Chauhan	
Chup Chup Ke	"Ghoomar" (Remix Version)	Himesh Reshammiya	Sameer	Sunidhi Chauhan	
Dhoom 2	"Touch Me"	Pritam	Sameer	Alisha Chinai	
Fight Club – Members Only	"Yeh Khuda"	Pritam	Mayur Puri		
Fight Club – Members Only	"Yeh Khuda" (Remix Version)	Pritam	Mayur Puri		
Gangster	"Tu Hi Meri Shab Hai"	Pritam	Sayeed Quadri		
Gangster	"Tu Hi Meri Shab Hai" (Version 1)	Pritam	Sayeed Quadri		
Gangster	"Tu Hi Meri Shab Hai" (Version 2)	Pritam	Sayeed Quadri		
Gangster	"Ya Ali" (Remix)	Pritam	Sayeed Quadri		
Golmaal: Fun Unlimited	"Golmaal" (Version 2)	Vishal–Shekhar	Kumaar	Vishal Dadlani, Shaan	
Humko Deewana Kar Gaye	"Fanah"	Anu Malik	Sameer	Anu Malik	
Humko Deewana Kar Gaye	"Fanah" (Remix Version)	Anu Malik	Sameer	Anu Malik	
Jawani Diwani: A Youthful Joyride	"Jiska Mujhe Intezaar"	Sajid–Wajid	Shabbir Ahmed	Suzanne D'Mello	
Kabul Express	"Banjar" (Revisited Version)	Raghav Sachar	Aditya Dhar		
Kachchi Sadak	"Kachchi Sadak"	Uttam Singh	Prabha Thakur		
Mr. Khulji	"Kool Baby Kool"	Prem Paras	Anwar Khan	Rajesh Mishra, Tarannum Malik	
Naksha	"U & I (Let's Do Balle Balle)"	Pritam	Sameer	Pritam	
Taxi No. 9211	"Ek Nazar Mein Bhi"	Vishal–Shekhar	Vishal Dadlani	Sunidhi Chauhan	
The Killer	"O Sanam"	Sajid–Wajid	Jalees Sherwani	Shreya Ghoshal	
The Killer	"Teri Yaadon Mein"	Sajid–Wajid	Jalees Sherwani	Shreya Ghoshal	
The Killer	"Teri Yadoon Mein" (Remix Version)	Sajid–Wajid	Jalees Sherwani	Shreya Ghoshal	
We R Friends	"Holiday Holiday"	Anand–Milind	Jalees Sherwani		
Woh Lamhe...	"Kya Mujhe Pyaar Hai"	Pritam	Neelesh Misra		
Woh Lamhe...	"Kya Mujhe Pyaar Hai" (Remix Version)	Pritam	Neelesh Misra		
36 China Town	"Badi Dilchaspi Hai"	Himesh Reshammiya	Sameer Anjaan		
36 China Town	"Badi Dilchaspi Hai-Remix"	Himesh Reshammiya	Sameer Anjaan		

=== 2007 ===
Film	Song	Composer(s)	Writer(s)	Co-singer(s)	Ref.
Bhool Bhulaiyaa	"Allah Hafiz"	Pritam	Sameer & Sayeed Quadri		
Bhool Bhulaiyaa	"Labon Ko"	Pritam	Sameer & Sayeed Quadri		
Bhool Bhulaiyaa	"Labon Ko" (Remix Version)	Pritam	Sameer & Sayeed Quadri		
Bhool Bhulaiyaa	"Sajda"	Pritam	Sameer & Sayeed Quadri		
Bhool Bhulaiyaa	"Sajda" (Remix Version)	Pritam	Sameer & Sayeed Quadri		
Chain Kulii Ki Main Kulii	"Khula Aasman"	Salim–Sulaiman	Irfan Siddiqui	Salim Merchant	
Chak De! India	"Ek Hockey Doongi Rakh Ke"	Salim–Sulaiman	Jaideep Sahni	Shah Rukh Khan	
Dhokha	"Kab Tujhe"	M.M. Kreem	Sayeed Quadri	Shreya Ghoshal	
Dhokha	"Anjana" (Version 1)	M.M. Kreem	Shakeel Azmi		
Dus Kahaniyaan	"Bin Tum"	Anand Raj Anand	Panchhi Jalonvi		
Dus Kahaniyaan	"Dus"	Anand Raj Anand	Panchhi Jalonvi	Anchal Datta Bhatia	
Dus Kahaniyaan	"Dus Kahaniyaan" (Remix Version)	Anand Raj Anand	Panchhi Jalonvi	Anchal Datta Bhatia	
Dus Kahaniyaan	"O Maahiya"	Anand Raj Anand	Panchhi Jalonvi	Shweta Vijay	
Dus Kahaniyaan	"O Maahiya" (Remix Version)	Anand Raj Anand	Panchhi Jalonvi	Shweta Vijay	
Game	"Bheege Naina"	Bapi–Tutul	Sandeep Nath		
Hattrick	"Ek Pal Mein"	Pritam	Mayur Puri		
Jhoom Barabar Jhoom	"Jhoom Barabar Jhoom"	Shankar–Ehsaan–Loy	Gulzar	Sukhwinder Singh, Mahalakshmi Iyer, Shankar Mahadevan	
Laaga Chunari Mein Daag	"Ik Teekhi Teekhi Si Ladki"	Shantanu Moitra	Swanand Kirkire	Shreya Ghoshal	
Laaga Chunari Mein Daag	"Kachchi Kaliyaan"	Shantanu Moitra	Swanand Kirkire	Sonu Nigam, Sunidhi Chauhan, Shreya Ghoshal	
Life Mein Kabhie Kabhiee	"Hum Tum Hum Tum"	Lalit Pandit	Sameer	Gayatri Ganjawala	
Life in a... Metro	"Alvida"	Pritam	Amitabh Verma		
Life in a... Metro	"O Meri Jaan"	Pritam	Amitabh Verma		
Life in a... Metro	"O Meri Jaan" (Reprise)	Pritam	Amitabh Verma	Suhail Kaul	
MP3: Mera Pehla Pehla Pyaar	"Mera Pehla Pehla Pyaar"	Ashutosh Phatak, Dhruv Ghanekar	Vipin Mishra		
MP3: Mera Pehla Pehla Pyaar	"Mera Pehla Pehla Pyaar" (Remix Version)	Ashutosh Phatak, Dhruv Ghanekar	Vipin Mishra		
Nehlle Pe Dehlla	"Parvar Digara"	Pritam	Panchhi Jalonvi	Tulsi Kumar	
Nehlle Pe Dehlla	"Parvar Digara" (Remix Version)	Pritam	Panchhi Jalonvi	Tulsi Kumar	
Om Shanti Om	"Aankhon Mein Teri"	Vishal–Shekhar	Javed Akhtar		
Raqeeb	"Jaane Kaise"	Pritam	Sameer		
Raqeeb	"Jaane Kaise" (Remix Version)	Pritam	Sameer		
Showbiz	"Duniya Ne Dil Toda"	Lalit Pandit	Sayeed Quadri		
Showbiz	"Mere Falak Ka Tu Hi Sitara"	Lalit Pandit	Sayeed Quadri		
Showbiz	"Mere Falak Ka Tu Hi Sitara" (Unplugged Version)	Lalit Pandit	Sayeed Quadri		
Showbiz	"Tu Mujhse Jab Se Mila Hai"	Lalit Pandit	Sayeed Quadri		
Showbiz	"Tu Mujhse Jab Se Mila Hai" (Rap By Earl)	Lalit Pandit	Sayeed Quadri		
Ta Ra Rum Pum	"Ab Toh Forever"	Vishal–Shekhar	Javed Akhtar	Shreya Ghoshal, Vishal Dadlani	
The Train	"Beete Lamhein"	Mithoon	Sayeed Quadri	Kshitij Tarey	
The Train	"Beete Lamhein" (Lounge Mix Version)	Mithoon	Sayeed Quadri		
The Train	"Teri Tamanna"	Mithoon	Sayeed Quadri	Shilpa Rao, Zubeen Garg	
The Train	"Teri Tamanna" (Euro Mix Version)	Mithoon	Sayeed Quadri	Shilpa Rao, Zubeen Garg	
The Train	"Teri Tamanna" (Club Mix Version)	Mithoon	Sayeed Quadri	Shilpa Rao, Zubeen Garg	

=== 2008 ===
Film	Song	Composer(s)	Writer(s)	Co-singer(s)	Ref.
Bachna Ae Haseeno	"Khuda Jaane"	Vishal–Shekhar	Anvita Dutt Guptan	Shilpa Rao	
Bachna Ae Haseeno	"Khuda Jaane" (Remix Version)	Vishal–Shekhar	Anvita Dutt Guptan	Shilpa Rao	
Bhram	"Lagdaa Naa Lagdaa"	Siddharth-Suhas	Kumaar		
Bombay to Bangkok	"Same Same But Different"	Salim–Sulaiman	Mir Ali Husain	Lena Christensen, Shreyas Talpade	
Bombay to Bangkok	"Same Same But Different" (Remix Version)	Salim–Sulaiman	Mir Ali Husain	Lena Christensen, Shreyas Talpade	
C Kkompany	"Jaane Kya"	Bappi Lahiri	Shabbir Ahmed	Shreya Ghoshal	
Dashavatar	"Bolo Bolo Ramchandra Ki Jai"	Anand Kurhekar	Sandeep Khare		
De Taali	"Tooti Phooti"	Vishal–Shekhar	Vishal Dadlani	Shaan, Sunidhi Chauhan	
Hijack	"Aksar"	Justin-Uday	Kumaar		
Hijack	"Aksar" (Remix Version)	Justin-Uday	Kumaar	Joy	
Hijack	"Koi Na Jaane"	Justin-Uday	Kumaar	Shilpa Rao	
Jannat	"Haan Tu Hai"	Pritam	Sayeed Quadri		
Jannat	"Zara Sa"	Pritam	Sayeed Quadri		
Jannat	"Zara Sa" (Power Ballad Version)	Pritam	Sayeed Quadri		
Khushboo	"Paake Tujhe"	Adnan Sami	Javed Akhtar		
Khushboo	"Paake Tujhe" (Lovers Mix Version)	Adnan Sami	Javed Akhtar		
Love Story 2050	"Aa Gaya Hun Mein"	Anu Malik	Javed Akhtar		
Love Story 2050	"Meelon Ka Jaisa Tha Fasla" (Happy Version)	Anu Malik	Javed Akhtar	Alka Yagnik	
Love Story 2050	"Meelon Ka Jaisa Tha Fasla" (Sad Version)	Anu Malik	Javed Akhtar	Alka Yagnik	
Mukhbiir	"Tu Salaamat"	Pritam	P.K. Mishra, Iqbal Patni		
My Name is Anthony Gonsalves	"Allah Beley"	Sachin–Jigar	Sameer		
My Name is Anthony Gonsalves	"Tum Mile"	Himesh Reshammiya	Sameer	Sunidhi Chauhan	
My Name is Anthony Gonsalves	"Tum Mile" (Remix Version)	Himesh Reshammiya	Sameer	Sunidhi Chauhan	
Race	"Dekho Nashe Mein"	Pritam	Sameer	Shaan, Sunidhi Chauhan	
Race	"Dekho Nashe Mein" (Asian RnB Mix)	Pritam	Sameer	Shaan, Sunidhi Chauhan	
Race	"Dekho Nashe Mein" (Latin Feista Mix)	Pritam	Sameer	Shaan, Sunidhi Chauhan	
Rafoo Chakkar	"Khuda Hafez"	Siddharth-Suhas	Salim Bijnori	Shaan	
Rama Rama Kya Hai Dramaa?	"Dekha Tujhe Sau Martaba"	Siddharth-Suhas	Kumaar		
Rama Rama Kya Hai Dramaa?	"Dekha Tujhe Sau Martaba"	Siddharth-Suhas	Kumaar		
Roadside Romeo	"Chhoo Le Na"	Salim–Sulaiman	Jaideep Sahni	Sudesh Bhosle, Sunidhi Chauhan	
Roadside Romeo	"Chhoo Le Na" (Moonlight Club Mix Version)	Salim–Sulaiman	Jaideep Sahni	Sudesh Bhosle, Sunidhi Chauhan	
Sirf	"Mumbai Nagariya"	Sohail Sen, Shibani Kashyap	Mehboob Kotwal, Vipul Saini	Tarannum Mallik	
Sorry Bhai!	"Jalte Hain" (Version 2)	Gaurav Dayal	Amitabh Verma		
Sorry Bhai!	"Mere Khuda"	Gaurav Dayal	Amitabh Verma		
Sorry Bhai!	"Mere Khuda" (Remix Version)	Gaurav Dayal	Amitabh Verma		
Sorry Bhai!	"Sorry Bhai"	Vivek Philip	Amitabh Verma	Abhishek Nailwal, Sunidhi Chauhan	
Welcome to Sajjanpur	"Bheeni Bheeni Mehki Mehki"	Shantanu Moitra	Swanand Kirkire	Shreya Ghoshal	
Welcome to Sajjanpur	"Sita Ram Sita Ram"	Shantanu Moitra	Swanand Kirkire		
Welcome to Sajjanpur	"Sita Ram Sita Ram" (Remix Version)	Shantanu Moitra	Swanand Kirkire		

=== 2009 ===
Film	Song	Composer(s)	Writer(s)	Co-singer(s)	Ref.
42 Kms	"Chaand Zameen Pe"	Tubby-Parik	Shahab Allahabadi	Rags, Clinton Cerejo	
99	"Punjabi Size"	Mahesh Shankar	Chintan Gandhi	Labh Janjua, Kalyani, Roopa	
99	"What's Up"	Shamir Tandon	Shabbir Ahmed	Sunidhi Chauhan	
99	"What's Up Grooving Blues Mix"	Shamir Tandon	Shabbir Ahmed	Sunidhi Chauhan	
Aasma	"Aasma"	Afsar-Sajid	Shahab Allahabadi	Shaan, Mahalakshmi Iyer	
Ajab Prem Ki Ghazab Kahani	"Main Tera Dhadkan Teri"	Pritam	Irshad Kamil	Hard Kaur, Sunidhi Chauhan	
Ajab Prem Ki Ghazab Kahani	"Main Tera Dhadkan Teri" (Remix Version)	Pritam	Irshad Kamil	Hard Kaur, Sunidhi Chauhan	
All the Best: Fun Begins	"Haan Main Jitni Martaba"	Pritam	Kumaar	Yashita Yashpal Sharma	
All the Best: Fun Begins	"Haan Main Jitni Martaba" (Remix Version)	Pritam	Kumaar	Yashita Yashpal Sharma	
Billu	"Ae Aa O"	Pritam	Neeraj Shridhar	Rana Mazumder, Suraj Jagan	
Billu	"Ae Aa O" (Remix Version)	Pritam	Neeraj Shridhar	Rana Mazumder, Suraj Jagan	
Billu	"Marjaani Marjaani" (Balkan Mix Version)	Pritam	Gulzar	Akriti Kakar	
Dil Bole Hadippa!	"Discowale Khisko"	Pritam	Jaideep Sahni	Rana Mazumdar, Sunidhi Chauhan	
Do Knot Disturb	"Mere Naal"	Nadeem–Shravan	Sameer	Shreya Ghoshal, Earl E.D, Nitika Kanwar	
Fox	"Yaadein"	Monty Sharma	Sandeep Nath		
Horn 'Ok' Pleassss	"Oya Oya"	Lalit Pandit	Farhaad, Salim Bijnori	Shilpa Rao	
Jashnn	"Aaya Re"	Sharib–Toshi	Kumaar		
Jashnn	"Nazrein Karam"	Sharib–Toshi	Kumaar	Shreya Ghoshal	
Jashnn	"Nazrein Karam" (Remix Version)	Sharib–Toshi	Kumaar	Shreya Ghoshal	
Kambakkht Ishq	"Kambakkht Ishq"	Anu Malik	Anvita Dutt Guptan	Sunidhi Chauhan	
Kambakkht Ishq	"Kambakkht Ishq" (Remix Version)	Anu Malik	Anvita Dutt Guptan	Sunidhi Chauhan	
Love Aaj Kal	"Main Kya Hoon"	Pritam	Irshad Kamil		
Maruti Mera Dosst	"Ayege Nindiya Ankheionke"	Kartik Shah	Subrat Sinha	Shreya Ghoshal	
New York	"Hai Junoon"	Pritam	Sandeep Srivastava		
New York	"Hai Junoon" (Remix Version)	Pritam	Sandeep Srivastava		
Raaz: The Mystery Continues	"Kaisa Ye Raaz Hai"	Pranay M. Rijia	Sayeed Quadri		
Raaz: The Mystery Continues	"O Jaana"	Raju Singh	Kumaar		
Raaz: The Mystery Continues	"O Jaana" (Dance With Me Mix Version)	Raju Singh	Kumaar		
Runway	"Teri Yaadein Leke Dil Mein" (Sad Version)	Shamir Tandon	Shabbir Ahmed		
Runway	"Teri Yaadein" (Remix Version)	Shamir Tandon	Shabbir Ahmed		
Sikandar	"Gulon Mein" (Version 1)	Sandesh Shandilya	Neelesh Misra		
Tum Mile	"Dil Ibaadat"	Pritam	Sayeed Quadri		
Tum Mile	"Dil Ibaadat" (Rock Version)	Pritam	Sayeed Quadri		
Tum Mile	"O Meri Jaan"	Pritam	Sayeed Quadri		
Victory	"Aisa Toh Socha Na Tha"	Anu Malik	Amitabh Verma		

=== 2010 ===
Film	Song	Composer(s)	Writer(s)	Co-singer(s)	Ref.
Action Replayy	"Luk Chhup Jaana"	Pritam	Irshad Kamil	Tulsi Kumar	
Badmaash Company	"Ayaashi"	Pritam	Anvita Dutt Guptan		
Badmaash Company	"Ayaashi" (Remix Version)	Pritam	Anvita Dutt Guptan		
Click	"Yaadein Yaad Aati Hain"	Shamir Tandon	Shabbir Ahmed	Sunidhi Chauhan, Vijay Prakash	
Crook	"Mere Bina" (Unplugged Version)	Pritam	Kumaar		
Crook	"Tujhi Mein"	Pritam	Kumaar		
Crook	"Tujhi Mein" (Reprise Version)	Pritam	Kumaar		
Golmaal 3	"Golmaal"	Pritam	Kumaar	Anushka Manchanda, Monali Thakur	
Golmaal 3	"Golmaal" (Remix Version)	Pritam	Kumaar	Anushka Manchanda, Monali Thakur	
Guzaarish	"Daayein Baayein"	Sanjay Leela Bhansali	A.M. Turaz		
Guzaarish	"Jaane Kiske Khwaab"	Sanjay Leela Bhansali	A.M. Turaz		
Guzaarish	"Guzaarish"	Sanjay Leela Bhansali	A.M. Turaz	Shail Hada	
Hum Tum Aur Ghost	"Dekho Raste Mein"	Shankar–Ehsaan–Loy	Javed Akhtar	Shreya Ghoshal	
Hum Tum Aur Ghost	"Dekho Raste Mein" (Remix Version)	Shankar–Ehsaan–Loy	Javed Akhtar	Shreya Ghoshal	
Karthik Calling Karthik	"Jaane Ye Kya Hua"	Shankar–Ehsaan–Loy	Javed Akhtar		
Khatta Meetha	"Sajde Kya"	Pritam	Irshad Kamil	Sunidhi Chauhan	
Khatta Meetha	"Sajde Kya" (remix)	Pritam	Irshad Kamil	Harshdeep Kaur, Suzanne D'Mello	
Kites	"Dil Kyun Yeh Mera"	Rajesh Roshan	Nasir Faraaz		
Kites	"Dil Kyun Yeh Mera" (Remix Version)	Rajesh Roshan	Nasir Faraaz		
Kites	"Zindagi Do Pal Ki"	Rajesh Roshan	Nasir Faraaz		
Kites	"Zindagi Do Pal Ki" (Remix Version)	Rajesh Roshan	Nasir Faraaz		
Knock Out	"Tuhi Mere Hum Navaa"	Gourav Dasgupta	Panchhi Jalonvi		
Krantiveer: The Revolution	"Khuda Mere Khuda"	Sachin–Jigar	Sameer	Shreya Ghoshal	
Lahore	"Ab Ye Kaafila"	M.M. Kreem	Junaid Wasi	Karthik, M.M. Kreem	
Mallika	"Chahoon Tujhe"	Pritam	Sudhakar Sharma	Sunidhi Chauhan	
Mr. Singh Mrs. Mehta	"Barhaan Dil" (Male Version)	Shujaat Khan	Amitabh Verma		
Muskurake Dekh Zara	"Sahi Bola"	Ranjit Barot	Mehboob Kotwal		
Once Upon a Time in Mumbaai	"I Am In Love" (Dance Version)	Pritam	Neelesh Misra	Dominique Cerejo	
Once Upon a Time in Mumbaai	"I Am In Love" (Duet Version)	Pritam	Neelesh Misra	Dominique Cerejo	
Ramaa: The Saviour	"Sunlena Sunlena"	Siddharth-Suhas	Kumaar		
Ramayana: The Epic	"Tu Hi Tu Hai"	Shaarang Dev Pandit	Ramendra Mohan Tripathi	Shreya Ghoshal	
Red Alert: The War Within	"Poochta Hai Mann Ye Tera"	Lalit Pandit	Javed Akhtar		
Swaha	"Barbadiyan"	Praveen Bharadwaj	Praveen Bharadwaj	Rikkee	

=== 2011 ===
Film	Song	Composer(s)	Writer(s)	Co-singer(s)	Ref.
7 Khoon Maaf	"O' Mama"	Vishal Bhardwaj	Ajinkya Iyer	Clinton Cerejo	
7 Khoon Maaf	"O' Mama" (Acoustic Version)	Vishal Bhardwaj	Ajinkya Iyer	Clinton Cerejo	
Always Kabhi Kabhi	" Antenna" (Reloaded – SRK Mix Version)	Pritam	Amitabh Bhattacharya	Anupam Amod, Apeksha Dandekar	
Desi Boyz	"Make Some Noise for the Desi Boyz"	Pritam	Kumaar	Bob	
Desi Boyz	"Make Some Noise for the Desi Boyz" (Remix Version)	Pritam	Kumaar	Bob	
Don 2	"Mujhko Pehchaanlo"	Shankar–Ehsaan–Loy	Javed Akhtar		
Don 2	"Mujhko Pehchaanlo" (Remix Version)	Shankar–Ehsaan–Loy	Javed Akhtar		
Force	"Khwabon Khwabon"	Harris Jayaraj	Javed Akhtar	Suchitra	
Game	"Kaun Hai Ajnabi"	Shankar–Ehsaan–Loy	Javed Akhtar	Aditi Singh Sharma	
Game	"Kaun Hai Ajnabi" (Remix Version)	Shankar–Ehsaan–Loy	Javed Akhtar	Aditi Singh Sharma	
Haunted – 3D	"Tum Ho Mera Pyar"	Chirrantan Bhatt	Shakeel Azmi	Suzanne D'Mello	
I Am	"Bojhal Se"	Rajiv Bhalla	Amitabh Verma		
I Am	"Bojhal Se" (Remix Version)	Rajiv Bhalla	Amitabh Verma		
I Am	"Issi Baat Pe"	Amit Trivedi	Amitabh Bhattacharya		
I Am	"Issi Baat Pe" (The Bombay Bounce Club Mix Version)	Amit Trivedi	Amitabh Bhattacharya		
I Am Kalam	"Chand Taare"	Abhishek Ray	Manavendra		
Jo Hum Chahein	"Abhi Abhi"	Sachin Gupta	Kumaar	Sasha Tirupati	
Jo Hum Chahein	"Ishq Hothon Se"	Sachin Gupta	Kumaar	Shreya Ghoshal	
Lanka	"Barham Hain Hum"	Gaurav Dagaonkar	Seema Saini	Shabab Sabri	
Loot	"Ajab Hulchal Si"	Shamir Tandon	Shabbir Ahmed	Kunal Ganjawala, Shaan, Vasundhara Das, Pinky Chinoy	
Mere Brother Ki Dulhan	"Mere Brother Ki Dulhan"	Sohail Sen	Irshad Kamil		
Mumbai Mast Kallander	"Sunn Zara"	Afsar, Sajid Khan	Panchhi Jalonvi		
Mumbai Mast Kallander	"Sunn Zara" (Remix Version)	Anaamik Chauhan	Panchhi Jalonvi		
Mumbai Mast Kallander	"Sunn Zara" (Reprise Version)	Teenu Arora	Panchhi Jalonvi		
My Friend Pinto	"Yaadon Ki Album"	Ajay–Atul	Amitabh Bhattacharya		
Pyaar Ka Punchnama	"Life Sahi Hai"	Clinton Cerejo	Luv Ranjan	Vishal Dadlani, Benny Dayal, Sidd Coutto	
Ready	"Humko Pyar Hua"	Pritam	Neelesh Misra	Tulsi Kumar	
Ready	"Humko Pyar Hua" (Remix Version)	Pritam	Neelesh Misra	Tulsi Kumar	
Ye Stupid Pyar	"Tere Naam Se"	Vipin Patwa	Yusuf Alikhan	Joy	
Ye Stupid Pyar	"Tere Naam Se" (Remix Version)	Vipin Patwa	Yusuf Alikhan	Joy	

=== 2012 ===
Film	Song	Composer(s)	Writer(s)	Co-singer(s)	Ref.
1920: Evil Returns	"Jaavedaan Hai"	Chirrantan Bhatt	Shakeel Azmi	Suzanne D'Mello	
Ek Tha Tiger	"Laapata"	Sohail Sen	Anvita Dutt Guptan	Palak Muchhal	
Ek Tha Tiger	"Laapata" (Remix Version)	Sohail Sen	Anvita Dutt Guptan	Palak Muchhal	
Jannat 2	"Jannatein Kahan"	Pritam	Mayur Puri		
Jannat 2	"Tujhe Sochta Hoon"	Pritam	Sayeed Quadri		
Jism 2	"Abhi Abhi" (Duet Version)	Arko Pravo Mukherjee	Arko Pravo Mukherjee, Manish Makhija	Akriti Kakar, Shreya Ghoshal	
Jism 2	"Abhi Abhi" (Male Version)	Arko Pravo Mukherjee	Arko Pravo Mukherjee, Manish Makhija		
Kahaani	"Kahaani" (Male Version)	Vishal–Shekhar	Vishal Dadlani		
Life! Camera Action...	"Chalte Jaana Hain"	Manoj Singh	Rohit Gupta		
Makkhi (Dubbed version)	"Are Are Are"	M.M. Kreem	Neelesh Misra		
Qasam Se Qasam Se	"Tum Kahan Ho"	Shailendra-Sayanti	Dr. Moauzzam Azam, Panchhi Jalonvi		
Raaz 3D	"Rafta Rafta"	Jeet Gannguli	Sanjay Masoom		
Shirin Farhad Ki Toh Nikal Padi	"Kaafir Andhere"	Jeet Gannguli	Amitabh Bhattacharya		
Shirin Farhad Ki Toh Nikal Padi	"Ishq Mein Tere Bina"	Jeet Gannguli	Amitabh Bhattacharya	Shreya Ghoshal	
Zindagi Tere Naam	"Tu Mujhe Soch Kabhi"	Sajid–Wajid	Jalees Sherwani		

=== 2013 ===
Film	Song	Composer(s)	Writer(s)	Co-singer(s)	Ref.
3G	"Kaise Bataaoon"	Mithoon		Sonal Chauhan	
Akaash Vani	"Pad Gaye Ji"	Hitesh Sonik	Luv Ranjan	Sunidhi Chauhan	
Aashiqui 2	"Piya Aaye Na"	Jeet Gannguli	Irshad Kamil	Tulsi Kumar	
Bloody Isshq	"Ajab Hai Ye Zindagi"	Ashok Bhadra	Kumaar		
Bloody Isshq	"Falsafa"	Ashok Bhadra	Kumaar		
Bombay Talkies	"Apna Bombay Talkies"	Amit Trivedi	Swanand Kirkire	Udit Narayan, Alka Yagnik, Kumar Sanu, Abhijeet Bhattacharya, S. P. Balasubrahmanyam, Kavita Krishnamurthy, Sudesh Bhonsle, Shreya Ghoshal, Shaan, Sunidhi Chauhan, Sukhwinder Singh, Shilpa Rao, Mohit Chauhan, Sonu Nigam	
Luv U Soniyo	"Tumsa Nahin Hai Koi"	Vipin Patwa	DR Sagar	Anwesha Sarkar	
Murder 3	"Mat Aazma Re"	Pritam	Sayeed Quadri		
Race 2	"Party On My Mind"	Pritam	Prashant Ingole, Yo Yo Honey Singh	Shefali Alvares, Yo Yo Honey Singh	
Race 2	"Party On My Mind" (Remix Version)	Pritam	Prashant Ingole, Yo Yo Honey Singh	Shefali Alvares, Yo Yo Honey Singh	
Special 26	"Tujh Sang Lagee"	M. M. Keeravani	Irshad Kamil	M. M. Keeravani	

=== 2014 ===
Film	Song	Composer(s)	Writer(s)	Co-singer(s)	Ref.
Yaariyan	"Meri Maa" (Version 1)	Pritam	Irshad Kamil		
Yaariyan	"Meri Maa" (Reprise Version)	Pritam	Irshad Kamil		
Paranthe Wali Gali	"Tere Bin Ho Na Sakega Gujara"	Vasundhara Das	Vipin Mishra		
Gunday	"Tune Maari Entriyaan"	Sohail Sen	Irshad Kamil	Vishal Dadlani, Neeti Mohan, Bappi Lahiri	
Heartless	"Soniye"	Gaurav Dagaonkar	Seema Saini		
Purani Jeans	"Dil Aaj Kal"	Ram Sampath	Prashant Ingole		
Manjunath	"The Rock Song"	Parikrama	Rajneesh Bisht, Sandeep A. Varma		
Hate Story 2	"Kabhi Aayine Pe Likha Tujhe"	Rashid Khan	Tanveer Ghazi		
Hate Story 2	"Kabhi Aayine Pe Likha Tujhe" (Remix Version)	Rashid Khan	Tanveer Ghazi		
Happy New Year	"India Waale"	Vishal–Shekhar	Irshad Kamil	Vishal Dadlani, Neeti Mohan, Shankar Mahadevan	
Happy New Year	"India Waale" (Electronic Version)	Vishal–Shekhar	Irshad Kamil	Vishal Dadlani, Neeti Mohan, Shankar Mahadevan	
Happy New Year	"World Dance Medley"	Vishal–Shekhar	Irshad Kamil	Neeti Mohan, Vishal Dadlani, Sukhwinder Singh, Shankar Mahadevan, Shahrukh Khan	
D Gangs Of Mumbai	"Maula"	Liyaqat Ajmeri	A.M. Turaz	Ali Aslam	

=== 2015 ===
Film	Song	Composer(s)	Writer(s)	Co-singer(s)	Ref.
Roy	"Yaara Re"	Ankit Tiwari	Sandeep Nath		
Ishq Ke Parindey	"Dil Tod Ke"	Vijay Vermaa	Manoj Muntashir		
Bajrangi Bhaijaan	"Tu Jo Mila"	Pritam	Kausar Munir		
Drishyam	"Kab Kahan Se"	Vishal Bhardwaj	Gulzar		
Ranviir the Marshal	"Kisne Yun Mujhko Chhua"	Ricky Mishra	Dr.Sagar		

=== 2016 ===
Film	Song	Composer(s)	Writer(s)	Co-singer(s)	Ref.
Airlift	"Tu Bhoola Jise"	Amaal Mallik	Kumaar		
Rhythm	"Ye Nasha"	Pranay M. Rijia	Sameer Anjaan	Natalie Di Luccio	
Awesome Mausam	"Kaisi Yeh Pyaas Hai"	Ishan Ghosh	Yogesh Bhardwaj	Priya Bhattacharya	
Fredrick	"Waqt Gaya Thum"	Sunjoy Bose	Rajesh Butalia		
Fredrick	"Khuda Tune Khuda Cheena Mujhse"	Sunjoy Bose	Rajesh Butalia		
Azhar	"Jeetne Ke Liye"	Amaal Mallik	Kumaar		
1920 London	"Aafreen Aafreen"	Kaushik-Akash	Prashant Ingole	Antara Mitra	
Raaz: Reboot	"O Meri Jaan"	Sangeet-Siddharth	Kausar Munir		
Ek Tera Saath	"Pakeeza"	Liyakat Ajmeri	Ahmed Siddiqui	Swati Sharma, Ali Aslam	
In Rahon Se	"In Rahon Se" (Title Track)	Vijay Verma	Ravi Kant	Madhushree	R

=== 2017 ===
Film	Song	Composer(s)	Writer(s)	Co-singer(s)	Ref.
Prakash Electronic	"Ishq Jo Karein"	Praveen Bharadwaj	Praveen Bharadwaj		
Rangoon	"Julia"	Vishal Bhardwaj	Gulzar	Sukhwinder Singh, Kunal Ganjawala	
Jeena Isi Ka Naam Hai	"Jeena Issi Ka Naam Hai"	Deepak Agrawal	Deepak Agrawal		
Raees	"Saanson Ke"	JAM8 (Aheer)	Manoj Yadav		
Laali Ki Shaadi Mein Laaddoo Deewana	"Bezubaan"	Vipin Patwa	Mahima Bhardwaj		
Shab	"Musafir Main Hoon"	Mithoon	Amitabh S. Verma		
Tubelight	"Main Agar" (Reprise)	Pritam	Amitabh Bhattacharya		
Raagdesh	"Hawaon Mein Woh Aag Hai"	Rana Mazumder	Sandeep Nath	Shreya Ghoshal	
Raagdesh	"Tujhe Namaami Ho"	Rana Mazumder	Sandeep Nath	Shreya Ghoshal, Sunidhi Chauhan, Rana Mazumder	
The Rally	"Main Jo Dekhu Na Tujhe"	Viju Shah	Sameer Anjaan		
The Rally	"Naiyo Jeena"	Viju Shah	Sameer Anjaan		

=== 2018 ===
Film	Song	Composer(s)	Writer(s)	Co-singer(s)	Ref.
Gold	"Khel Khel Mein"	Sachin–Jigar	Javed Akhtar	Sachin–Jigar	
Lashtam Pashtam	"Lashtam Pashtam"	Sana	Mehboob	Benny Dayal	
Lashtam Pashtam	"Rua Rua"	Sana	Mehboob		
Jalebi	"Tera Mera Rishta"	Tanishk Bagchi	Arafat Mehmood	Shreya Ghoshal	
Jalebi	"Tera Mera Rishta" (Solo)	Tanishk Bagchi	Arafat Mehmood		
Jalebi	"Pehle Ke Jaisa"	Abhishek Mishra	Rashmi Virag		

=== 2019 ===
Film	Song	Composer(s)	Writer(s)	Co-singer(s)	Ref.
Badla	"Tum Na Aaye"	Amaal Mallik	A. M. Turaz		
Downtown	"Tumhi To Ho"	Sanjeev–Darshan	Nasir Faraz		
Chhichhore	"Kal Ki Hi Baat Hai"	Pritam	Amitabh Bhattacharya		
Sye Raa Narasimha Reddy (Dubbed version)	"Saansein Teri Desh Hai"	Amit Trivedi	Swanand Kirkire		

=== 2020 ===
Film	Song	Composer(s)	Writer(s)	Co-singer(s)	Ref.
Love Aaj Kal	"Aur Tanha"	Pritam	Irshad Kamil		
Baaghi 3	"Dus Bahane 2.0"	Vishal–Shekhar	Panchhi Jalonvi	Vishal–Shekhar, Shaan, Tulsi Kumar	
Sadak 2	"Dil Ki Purani Sadak"	Samidh Mukerjee & Urvi	Vijay Vijawatt		
Sadak 2	"Purani Sadak" (Reprise)	Samidh Mukerjee & Urvi	Vijay Vijawatt		
Sadak 2	"Shukriya (Reprise)"	Jeet Gannguli	Rashmi Virag	Jubin Nautiyal	
Sadak 2	"Shukriya (Rendition)"	Jeet Gannguli	Rashmi Virag	Arijit Singh, Jubin Nautiyal	
It's My Life	"Idiot"	Shankar–Ehsaan–Loy	Neelesh Misra	Earl D'Souza	

=== 2021 ===
Film	Song	Composer(s)	Writer(s)	Co-singer(s)	Ref.
Bob Biswas	"Mujhe Mujhse Kaun Bachayega"	Anupam Roy	Siddhant Kaushal		Ref
83	"Yeh Hausle"	Pritam	Kausar Munir		Ref

=== 2022 ===
Film	Song	Composer(s)	Writer(s)	Co-singer(s)	Ref.
Sherdil	"Dhoop Paani Bahne De"	Shantanu Moitra	Gulzar	Rituraj	
Gumnaam (Hindi version)	"Tune Jaana Tha Doli Mein"	Liyakat Ajmeri	Amit Khan		
Gumnaam (Hindi version)	"Dhage Ishq Ke"	Liyakat Ajmeri	Amit Khan	Neeti Mohan	
Chakki	''Kyun''	Indian Ocean	Piyush Mishra		

=== 2023 ===
Film	Song	Composer(s)	Writer(s)	Co-singer(s)	Ref.
Lost	''Mon Re''	Shantanu Moitra	Swanand Kirkire		
Samara	''Dilbaro''	Deepak Warrier	Shaik Tabrez, Yusuf Baig	Lakshmi Mohan	

=== 2024 ===
Film	Song	Composer(s)	Writer(s)	Co-singer(s)	Ref.
Savi	"Vada Humse Karo"	Piyush Shankar	Rashmi Virag		
Savi	"Vada Humse Karo (Version 2)"	Piyush Shankar	Rashmi Virag		
Krispy Rishtey	Khwaab Jeete	Vijay Verma	Rajesh Manthan		

=== 2025 ===
Film	Song	Composer(s)	Writer(s)	Co-singer(s)	Ref.
Humein Asha Hai	Humein Asha Hai	Rahul R, Santosh Nair		-	

== Tamil songs ==
Year	Film	Song	Composer	Co-singer(s)	Writer
1997	Minsara Kanavu	"Strawberry Kannae"	A. R. Rahman	Febi Mani	Vairamuthu
1997	VIP	"Eechankaattu"	Ranjit Barot	Anupama	
1998	Uyirodu Uyiraga	"Poovukkellam"	Vidyasagar	Srinivas, Harini	Vairamuthu
1999	Kodiesvaran	"Naan Khelnaatu"	Agosh	Anupama, K. S. Chithra	Vairamuthu
1999	Kodiesvaran	"Alva Pappa"	Agosh	Anuradha Sriram	Vairamuthu
2001	12B	"Love Pannu"	Harris Jayaraj	Prashanthini	Vairamuthu
2001	12B	"Mutham Mutham"	Harris Jayaraj	Mahalakshmi Iyer	Vairamuthu
2001	Shahjahan	"Kadhal Oru"	Mani Sharma		Vairamuthu
2001	Little John	"Paadava Paadava"	Pravin Mani		Vairamuthu
2002	Pammal K. Sambandam	"Penne Kadhal"	Deva		Vaali
2002	Red	"Ollikuchi Udambukaari"	Deva	Anuradha Sriram	Vairamuthu
2003	Alai	"Nee Oru Desam"	Vidyasagar	Sujatha Mohan	Yugabharathi
2003	Anbe Anbe	"Roobanottil"	Bharadwaj	Anuradha Sriram	Kabilan
2003	Dhool	"Kundu Kundu"	Vidyasagar	Sunidhi Chauhan, Pop Shalini	Arivumathi
2003	Dum	"Polladha Padava"	Deva	Mahalakshmi Iyer	Pa. Vijay
2003	Jay Jay	"Pengal Nenjai"	Bharadwaj	Mahalakshmi Iyer	Vairamuthu
2003	Kaakha Kaakha	"Uyirin Uyirae"	Harris Jayaraj	Suchitra	Thamarai
2003	Paarai	"Vinayaga Vinayaga"	Sabesh–Murali	Anuradha Sriram	Vairamuthu
2003	Saamy	"Kalyaanam Thaan"	Harris Jayaraj	Yugendhar, Srilekha Parthasarathy	Snehan
2003	Success	"Marathi Kutti"	Deva	Mahalakshmi Iyer	Snehan
2004	7G Rainbow Colony	"Ninaithu Ninaithu"(Male)	Yuvan Shankar Raja		Na. Muthukumar
2004	Bose	"Nijama Nijama"	Yuvan Shankar Raja	Shreya Ghoshal	Na. Muthukumar
2004	Chellamae	"Kadhalikkum Asai"	Harris Jayaraj	Chinmayi, Mahathi, Premgi Amaren	Vairamuthu
2004	Ghilli	"Appadi Podu"	Vidyasagar	Anuradha Sriram	Pa. Vijay
2004	M. Kumaran Son of Mahalakshmi	"Neeye Neeye"	Srikanth Deva		Vaali
2004	M. Kumaran Son of Mahalakshmi	"Vacchuka Vacchukava"	Srikanth Deva	Srilekha Parthasarathy	Srikanth Deva
2004	Manmadhan	"Kadhal Valarthen"	Yuvan Shankar Raja		Na. Muthukumar
2004	Vasool Raja MBBS	"Pathukulle Number"	Bharadwaj	Shreya Ghoshal	Vairamuthu
2005	Aayudham	"Hormone Surrakuthu"	Dhina	Harini	Pa. Vijay
2005	Anniyan	"Andangkaka"	Harris Jayaraj	Shreya Ghoshal, Jassie Gift, Saindhavi	Vairamuthu
2005	Ayya	"Thamirabharani Raani"	Bharadwaj	Shreya Ghoshal	Pa. Vijay
2005	Ayya	"Oru Vaartha Kekka"	Bharadwaj	Sadhana Sargam	Pa. Vijay
2005	Chandramukhi	"Annanoda Pattu"	Vidyasagar	Sujatha Mohan, Karthik, Chinnaponnu	Kabilan
2005	Chinna	"Kaalangathala"	D. Imman	Anuradha Sriram	Palani Bharathi
2005	Daas	"Sakka Podu"	Yuvan Shankar Raja	Sadhana Sargam	Viveka
2005	Ji	"Vamba Velaikku"	Vidyasagar		Kabilan
2005	Kanda Naal Mudhal	"Pani Thuli"	Yuvan Shankar Raja	Shreya Ghoshal, Tanvi Shah	Thamarai
2005	Karka Kasadara	"A Joke"	Prayog	Mahalakshmi Iyer	R. V. Udayakumar
2005	Karka Kasadara	"Aithalakka"	Prayog	Malathy Lakshman	R. V. Udayakumar
2005	Oru Kalluriyin Kathai	"Kangal Kandadhu"	Yuvan Shankar Raja	Sujatha Mohan	Na. Muthukumar
2005	Oru Kalluriyin Kathai	"Pangu Podu"	Yuvan Shankar Raja	Ranjith	Na. Muthukumar
2005	Ponniyin Selvan	"Kola Kolayaa"	Vidyasagar	Sujatha Mohan	Pa. Vijay
2005	Sivakasi	"Deepavali"	Srikanth Deva	Vasundhara Das	Perarasu
2006	Aathi	"Lelakku Lelakku"	Vidyasagar	Sujatha Mohan	Pa. Vijay
2006	Idhaya Thirudan	"Unnai Thotta"	Bharadwaj		Vairamuthu
2006	Nenjil Jil Jil	"Kaadhalthaana"	D. Imman	K. S. Chithra	Pa. Vijay
2006	Nenjil Jil Jil	"Kannukkul Kalavaram"	D. Imman		Pa. Vijay
2006	Thirupathi	"Aathadi Aathadi"	Bharadwaj		Perarasu
2006	Thiruttu Payale	"Poi Solla Poren"	Bharadwaj	Kanmani	Vairamuthu
2007	Thaamirabharani	"Vaartha Onnu"	Yuvan Shankar Raja		Na. Muthukumar
2007	Deepavali	"Dhol Bhaje"	Yuvan Shankar Raja	Shweta Mohan	Na. Muthukumar
2007	Lee	"Jelina O Jelina"	D. Imman	Pop Shalini	Yugabharathi
2007	Thirumagan	"Shock Adikkuthu"	Deva	Anuradha Sriram	Vairamuthu
2007	Unnale Unnale	"Mudhal Naal"	Harris Jayaraj	Mahalakshmi Iyer, Pop Shalini	Pa. Vijay
2007	Billa	"My Name Is Billa"	Yuvan Shankar Raja	Naveen	Pa. Vijay
2008	Aegan	"Odum Varaiyil"	Yuvan Shankar Raja		Snehan
2008	Kuruvi	"Mozha Mozhannu"	Vidyasagar	Anuradha Sriram	Pa. Vijay
2008	Vedha	"Azhage Ahzage"	Srikanth Deva	Chinmayi	Thanga Senthilkumar
2009	1977	"Hawai Theevil"	Vidyasagar	Sowmya Raoh	Pa. Vijay
2009	Siva Manasula Sakthi	"Thithikum Theeyai"	Yuvan Shankar Raja	Shweta Mohan	Na. Muthukumar
2009	Peraanmai	"Kaattu Puli Adichu"	Vidyasagar	Jassie Gift	Vairamuthu
2010	Kutty	"Feel My Love"	Devi Sri Prasad		Viveka
2011	Kaavalan	"Pattampoochi"	Vidyasagar	Rita Thyagarajan	Kabilan
2011	Aadukalam	"En Vennilave"	G. V. Prakash Kumar		V. I. S. Jayapalan
2014	Yaan	"Nee Vandhu Ponadhu"	Harris Jayaraj	Bombay Jayashree, Ramya NSK, Megha	Thamarai
2014	Idhu Kathirvelan Kadhal	"Sara Sara Saravedi"	Harris Jayaraj	M. K. Balaji, Srilekha Parthasarathy	Yugabharathi
2019	Pettikadai	"Keelvanam Sivanthiruchi"	Maria Manohar		Marathamizh Vaenthan
2022	The Legend	"Konji Konji"	Harris Jayaraj	Shreya Ghoshal	Kabilan
2022	The Legend	"Popopo"	Harris Jayaraj	Prasad S.N, Jonita Gandhi	Madhan Karky

== Telugu songs ==
Year	Film	Song	Composer(s)	Writer(s)	Co-artist(s)
1996	Prema Desam	"College Style"	A. R. Rahman		S.P. Balasubrahmanyam, Hariharan
1996	Prema Desam	"Hello Doctor"	A. R. Rahman		Srinivas, Anupama, Noel James
1997	V. I. P.	"Ninna Nono Repu Nono"	Ranjit Barot		Anupama
1999	Samudram	"Hoosh Hoosh"	Shashi Preetam		
2001	Muthyam	"Vuchitam Vuchitam"	Vandemataram Srinivas		
2001	Chandu	"Kalalo Neeve"	K. Veeru		Preeti Pinky
2001	Kushi	"Ye Mera Jaha"	Mani Sharma		
2001	Jabili	"Ganga Yamuna Godari"	S. V. Krishna Reddy		K.S Chithra
2001	Tholi Valapu	"First Rank Manadera"	Vandemataram Srinivas		
2001	Tholi Valapu	"Kurrakaruki Bikeunte"	Vandemataram Srinivas		
2001	Prematho Raa	"Chandamamatho"	Mani Sharma		
2001	Subbu	"Miva Miva"	Mani Sharma		
2001	Manasantha Nuvve	"Aakashana"	R. P. Patnaik		Sujatha Mohan
2001	Manasantha Nuvve	"Evvarineppudu"	R. P. Patnaik		
2001	Nuvvu Nenu	"Nee Kosame"	R. P. Patnaik		
2001	Nuvvu Nenu	"Nuvve Naku Pranam"	R. P. Patnaik		Usha
2001	Student No.1	"Okariki Okarai"	M. M. Keeravani		Srivarthini
2002	Vasu	"Paataku Pranam"	Harris Jayaraj		Swarnalatha
2002	Vasu	"Sportive Boys"	Harris Jayaraj		
2002	Holi	"Aadapillalu"	R. P. Patnaik		Kavitha Krishnamurthy
2002	Holi	"O Cheliya"	R. P. Patnaik		Sadhana Sargam
2002	Holi	"Priyathama"	R. P. Patnaik		
2002	Jayam	"Prema Prema"	R. P. Patnaik		
2002	Nee Sneham	"Ooruko Hrudayama"	R. P. Patnaik		
2002	Santosham	"Devude Digi Vachina"	R. P. Patnaik		Usha
2002	Santosham	"Diri Diri Diridi Vareva"	R. P. Patnaik		Usha
2002	Yuvaratna	"Sandhya Sandhya"	M. M. Keeravani		Hrithika
2002	Neetho	"Panchaboothala"	Vidyasagar		Sadhana Sargam
2002	Dreams	"Thythaka"	Chakri		Kousalya
2002	Premaku Swagatam	"Chelive Vipu Chusi"	S. V. Krishna Reddy		
2002	Takkari Donga	"Aleba Aleba"	Mani Sharma		
2002	Indra	"Daayi Daayi Damma"	Mani Sharma		Mahalakshmi Iyer
2002	Ninu Choodaka Nenundalenu	"Aa Kondapalli"	Ilaiyaraaja		Sadhana Sargam
2002	Ninu Choodaka Nenundalenu	"Edo Mounaragam"	Ilaiyaraaja		
2002	Nuvve Nuvve	"I Am Very Sorry"	Koti		
2002	Idi Maa Ashokgadi Love Story	"Chali Chaliga"	Anand–Milind		Sowmya Raoh
2002	Idi Maa Ashokgadi Love Story	"Malli Janmistha"	Anand–Milind		
2002	Idi Maa Ashokgadi Love Story	"Aatallo Athletic"	Anand–Milind		
2003	Johnny	"Naalo Nuvokasagami"	Ramana Gogula		Usha
2003	Vishnu	"Nelluri Nerajana"	Ismail Darbar		Kavitha Krishnamurthy
2003	Juniors	"Chesindi Ok"	Chakri		Ravi Varma, Chakri
2003	Neeku Nenu Naaku Nuvvu	"Gummare Gummare"	R. P. Patnaik		Usha
2003	Ninne Ishtapaddanu	"Clean Bowled"	R. P. Patnaik		Ali
2003	Dil	"CM PM"	R. P. Patnaik		
2003	Dil	"Oka Nuvvu Oka Nenu"	R. P. Patnaik		
2003	Evare Athagadu	"Prema Intha Goppadani"	M. M. Keeravani		Ganga Sitharasu
2004	Malliswari	"Cheli Soku"	Koti		K.S. Chithra
2004	Arya	"Feel My Love"	Devi Sri Prasad		Clinton Cerejo
2004	Shankar Dada M.B.B.S.	"Chaila Chaila"	Devi Sri Prasad		Chiranjeevi
2004	Gharshana	"Cheliya Cheliya"	Harris Jayaraj		Suchitra
2004	Suryam	"Naakai Puttinadana"	Chakri (composer)		Shreya Ghoshal
2004	Naa Autograph	"Gurtukostunnayi"	M. M. Keeravani		
2004	Nenunnanu	"Neekosam Neekosam"	M. M. Keeravani		Shreya Ghoshal
2004	Gudumba Shankar	"Le Le Lele"	Mani Sharma		
2004	Prem Nagar	"Yedu Rangula Prema"	Anu Malik		Sadhana Sargam
2004	Prem Nagar	"Maargayare"	Anu Malik		Jolly Mukherjee, Kalpana
2004	7G Brindhavan Colony	"Thalachi Thalachi"(Male)	Yuvan Shankar Raja		
2005	Manasu Maata Vinadu	"Gubulendukey	Kalyani Malik		
2005	Manasu Maata Vinadu	"Aravailo"	Kalyani Malik		Shreya Ghoshal
2005	Andhrudu	"Osari Preminchaka"	Kalyani Malik		
2005	Avunanna Kaadanna	"Anaganaganaga Oka"	R. P. Patnaik		Usha
2005	Andarivaadu	"MTV Figuralle"	Devi Sri Prasad		Sunitha Sarathy
2005	Evadi Gola Vaadidhi	"Bangala Kaathaam"	Kamalakar		
2005	Dhairyam	"Naa Pranam"	Anup Rubens		Pooja, Shravani, Lavanya, Srinu, Pramod, Balaji
2005	Balu ABCDEFG	"Inte Inthinthe"	Mani Sharma		
2005	Kaadante Avunanele	"Santhoshaalane"	Sathyam		
2005	Nuvvante Naakishtam	"Enduke Paruvama"	Koti		K.S. Chithra
2005	Nuvvante Naakishtam	"Chupultho"	Koti		Shalini
2005	Mr. Errababu	"Yenduko"	Koti		
2005	Sada Mee Sevalo	"Yem Navvulivile"	Vandemataram Srinivas		Shreya Ghoshal
2005	Kumkuma	"Sannajaji Puvvu"	Ghantadi Krishna		Srilekha
2005	Aparichithudu	"Kondakaki Kondedana"	Harris Jayaraj		Jassie Gift, Sujatha Mohan
2005	Athadu	"Avunu Nijam"	Mani Sharma		Sunitha
2005	Jai Chiranjeeva	"Hey Jana"	Mani Sharma		
2006	Happy	"Yegire Mabbulalona"(version 2)	Yuvan Shankar Raja		
2006	Bangaram	"Chedugudante "	Vidyasagar		Anuradha Sriram, Sahithi, Dharani
2006	Style	"Rock & Roll"	Mani Sharma		Sunitha Sarathy
2006	Ashok	"Oka Chinni"	Mani Sharma		
2006	Ranam	"Ghana Ghana"	Mani Sharma		Sangeetha
2006	Veerabhadra	"Jujibeelallo"	Mani Sharma		Mahalakshmi Iyer
2006	Kokila	"Varshinche Megam"	Madhukar		Shaan, Tippu
2006	Sainikudu	"Go Go Go Adhigo"	Harris Jayaraj		
2006	Boss	"Andagadu Muttukunte"	Kalyani Malik		Sunitha
2006	Boss	"Anaganaganaga"	Kalyani Malik		Sunitha
2006	Boss	"Veluthunna"	Kalyani Malik		Sunitha
2007	Chirutha	"Ivvale"	Mani Sharma		Sunitha
2007	Lakshmi Kalyanam	"Gunde Gontulo"	R. P. Patnaik		
2007	Munna	"Kadhulu Kadhulu"	Harris Jayaraj		Karthik
2007	Munna	"Vasthava Vasthava"	Harris Jayaraj		Shalini
2007	Godava	"Hutch Phone"	Mani Sharma		Kousalya, Deepa
2008	Jalsa	"My Heart is Beating"	Devi Sri Prasad		
2008	Jalsa	"My Heart is Beating (Remix)"	Devi Sri Prasad		
2008	Chintakayala Ravi	"Valla Valla"	Vishal–Shekhar		Sunidhi Chauhan
2009	Oy!	"Waiting For You"	Yuvan Shankar Raja		
2009	Sankham	"Dakku Dakku"	S. Thaman		Rahul Nambiar, Priyadarshini, Megha
2009	Arya 2	"Uppenantha"	Devi Sri Prasad		
2010	Darling	"Hosahore"	G. V. Prakash Kumar		Lesle Lewis
2011	Prema Kavali	"Manasanta Mukkalu Chesi "	Anoop Rubens		
2011	Don 2	"Lokana Yavaraina"	Shankar–Ehsaan–Loy		
2012	Life Is Beautiful	"Life Is Beautiful"	Mickey J. Meyer		
2012	Naa Ishtam	"O Sathiya"	Chakri		
2012	Malli Kalusthaa	"Aanadhame Ambaram"	Brinda HK		
2013	Ramayya Vasthavayya	"Pandaga Chesko"	S. Thaman		
2014	Yevadu	"Cheliya Cheliya"	Devi Sri Prasad		
2014	Nee Jathaga Nenundali	"Kanabadunaa" (Piya Aaye Na)	Jeet Gannguli		Arpita Chakraborty

== Kannada songs ==
Year	Film	Song	Composer(s)	Writer(s)	Co-singer(s)
2001	Premakke Sai	"Premada Loka"	Mani Sharma		
2003	Hello	"Singapuralli"	Srishaila		Sunidhi Chauhan
2004	Love	"Elu Bannada"	Anu Malik		Sunidhi Chauhan
2004	Love	"Maargayare"	Anu Malik	Kaviraj	Kalpana, Nalini, Jolly
2004	Rowdy Aliya	"Nannahinde Yaaru"	Koti	K. Kalyan	Sunidhi Chauhan
2004	Sarvabhouma	"Selfish Selfishu"	Hamsalekha		
2005	News	"Gira Gira"	Gurukiran		Priyadarshini
2005	Anna Thangi	"Hubbaliya Sheharadaaga"	Hamsalekha	Hamsalekha	Anuradha Sriram
2006	Madana	"Kannu Ninnadu"	Yuvan Shankar Raja	K. Kalyan	
2007	Kshana Kshana	"Madhira Madhura"	R. P. Patnaik		Malgudi Subha
2008	Neenyare	"Super Computer"	V. Manohar		
2009	Parichaya	"Nadedaduva Kamanabillu"	Jessie Gift	Kaviraj	Rajalakshmi
2009	Manasaare	"Kanna Haniyondige"	Mano Murthy		Shreya Ghoshal
2009	Male Barali Manju Irali	"Vidayada Veleyalli"	Mano Murthy		
2009	Yogi	"Brucelee Vamsha"	Emil Mohammed		
2010	Sanchari	"Marethoda Maatide"	Arjun Janya		Anuradha Bhat
2014	Bahuparak	"Sneha Yembudu"	Bharath B. J.	Suni	Rajalakshmy
2014	Aryan	"Ondhu Haadu Mella"	Jassie Gift	Kaviraj	Shreya Ghoshal

== Marathi songs ==
Year	Film	Song	Composer(s)	Writer(s)	Co-singer(s)
2017	Spandan	"Hi Tarunai"	Anamik Chauhan	Shailesh Kulkarni	
2014	Friendship Dot com	"Ved he lagale (Ye na tu) "			
2023	Umbrella	"Ekant Hawa "	Santosh Mulekar	Mangesh Kangane	

== Bengali songs ==
Year	Film	Song	Composer(s)	Writer(s)	'Co-singer(s)
2012	Faande Poriya Boga Kaande Re	"Akasher Nile" (Male)	Jeet Gannguli	Prasen	
2019	Password	"Aye Khuda" (Hindi song)	Savvy	Soham Majumder	

== Malayalam songs ==
Year	Film	Song	Composer(s)	Writer(s)	Co-singer(s)
2009	Puthiya Mukham	"Rahasyamay"	Deepak Dev	Kaithapram	Shilpa Rao
2023	Samara	"Dilbaro" (Hindi portions)	Deepak Warrier	Yusuf Baig, Sarath R Nath	Lakshmi Mohan

== Gujarati songs ==
Year	Film	Song	Composer(s)	Writer(s)	Co-singer(s)
2019	Order Order Out of Order	"Tari Mari Vato"	Rahul Munjariya	Bhargav Purohit	

== Assamese songs ==
Year	Album	Song	Composer	Lyricist	Co-singer	Ref.
2000	Mann	"Man Dilo"	Anupam Saikia		Sadhana Sargam	
2000	Mann	"Kajol Tumi"	Anupam Saikia		Solo	

== Albums & EPs ==
Year	Album	Song	Composer(s)	Writer(s)	Co-singer(s)
1999	Pal	"Aap Ki Dua"	Lesle Lewis	Mehboob	
1999	Pal	"Yaaron"	Lesle Lewis	Mehboob	
1999	Pal	"Pal"	Lesle Lewis	Mehboob	
1999	Pal	"Dil Se Mat Khel"	Lesle Lewis	Mehboob	
1999	Pal	"Yeh Tanhai"	Lesle Lewis	Mehboob	
1999	Pal	"Mehki Hawa"	Lesle Lewis	Mehboob	
1999	Pal	"Ishara"	Lesle Lewis	Mehboob	
1999	Pal	"Din Ho Ya Raat"	Lesle Lewis	Mehboob	
2008	Humsafar	"Aasman Ke"	KK	Mehboob	
2008	Humsafar	"Dekho Na"	KK	Mehboob	
2008	Humsafar	"Yeh Kahan Mil Gaye Hum"	KK	Mehboob	
2008	Humsafar	"Rain Bhai Kaari (Maajhi)"	KK	Mehboob	
2008	Humsafar	"Masti"	KK	Mehboob	Nakul Krishna
2008	Humsafar	"Deewana Hai Mera Dil"	KK	Mehboob	
2008	Humsafar	"Humsafar"	KK	KK, Mehboob	
2008	Humsafar	"Cineraria"	KK	KK	
2008	Humsafar	"Din Ho Ya Raat"	Lesle Lewis	Mehboob	
2008	Humsafar	"Mehki Hawa"	Lesle Lewis	Mehboob	
2022	1992 Unreleased Album	Ae Dil Ae Dil Ae Dil	Radha Sharma	Renu Singhal	Charu, Shyama
2022	1992 Unreleased Album	Shivam Sha Sha	Radha Sharma	Renu Singhal	Charu, Shyama
2022	1992 Unreleased Album	Meri Saheli	Radha Sharma	Renu Singhal	Charu, Shyama
2022	1992 Unreleased Album	Baahon Mein Aao	Radha Sharma	Renu Singhal	Charu, Shyama
2022	1992 Unreleased Album	AC DC	Radha Sharma	Renu Singhal	Charu, Shyama

== TV Title Songs ==
Year	TV Show	Song	Composer(s)	Writer(s)	Co-singer(s)
1996	Just Mohabbat	"Just Mohabbat"	Raju Singh		
1998	Hip Hip Hurray	"Hip Hip Hurray"	Louis Banks	Vinay Pathak	Hema Sardesai
1999	Sansaar		Shantanu Moitra	Amitabh Verma	Antara Chowdhury
2001	Shaka Laka Boom Boom	"Shakalaka"			
2002	Annamalai (Tamil)	"Uyirgal Pirandhadhu"	Dhina	Vairamuthu	K. S. Chithra
2002	Kuchh Jhuki Palkain	Kuchh Jhuki Si Palkein	Lalit Sen	Nawab Arzoo	Mahalakshmi Iyer
2005	Kkavyanjali	Woh Mile The....	Pritam		
2010	Star Parivaar Awards				Shreya Ghoshal
2011	Just Dance (TV series)		Pritam		

== TV Performances ==
Year	Show	Song	Composer(s)	Writer(s)	Co-singer(s)
2001-02	Channel V Jammin	"Mujhe Pyaar Ho Gaya"	Zubeen Garg, KK, Suneeta Rao	KK, Suneeta Rao, Aslam	Suneeta Rao
2011	Coke Studio(India)-Season 1	"Chadta Suraj"	Aziz Nazan	Aziz Nazan	Sabri Brothers
2011	Coke Studio(India)-Season 1	"Khilte Hai Gul Yahan"	S. D. Burman	Gopaldas Neeraj	Mathangi Rajshekhar & Sanjay Vidyarthi
2011	Coke Studio(India)-Season 1	"Tu Aashiqui Hai"	Vishal–Shekhar	Vishal Dadlani	
2011	Coke Studio(India)-Season 1	"Tu Hai Yahan"	Lesle Lewis	Prashant Ingole	Leslie Lewis, Mathangi, Sabri Brothers & Sanjay Vidyarthi
2014	MTV Unplugged(India)-Season 3	"Pal"	Mehboob		
2014	MTV Unplugged(India)-Season 3	"Yaaron"	Mehboob		
2014	MTV Unplugged(India)-Season 3	"Tadap Tadap"	Mehboob		Ismail Darbar
2014	MTV Unplugged(India)-Season 3	"O Meri Jaan"	Pritam		Sandeep Shrivastav
2014	MTV Unplugged(India)-Season 3	"Beete Lamhein"	Mithoon		Sayeed Quadri
2014	MTV Unplugged(India)-Season 3	"Mujhko Pehchaanlo"	Shankar–Ehsaan–Loy		Javed Akhtar

== Other TV & Pop Songs ==
Year	TV & Pop Albums, EPs & Singles	Song	Composer(s)	Writer(s)	Co-singer(s)
1998	Coffee Aur Kreem	"Main Pagal Hoon"	M.M Keeravani	Nitin Raikwar	Hema Sardesai
1999	Cricket Meri Jaan	"Josh Of India"	Vishal Bhardwaj	Dr.Bashir Badr	
2008	The Ghost	"Tanha Chala"	Farrukh Abid & Shoiab Farrukh	Momina Duraid	
2010	Bandish	"Tere Bin"	Chris Powell		Deepak Nair
2010	Bandish	"Tere Bin Remix"	Chris Powell		Deepak Nair
	Hanuman Chalisa		Adesh Shrivastav	Tulsidas	Amitabh Bachchan & Various singers
2013	Maula Zubaan	"Yaad"	Siddharth	Sanket Vashisht	Siddharth
2013	Rise Up (Colors of Peace)	"Rose Of My Heart"	Gaurav Dhingra		Reet
2015	Electric & Alive	"Yo! Be the Power"	Queen Be & Massive Vibe Live	Queen Be	Massive Vibe Live, Akriti Kakar, Karthik, Bhoomi Trivedi
2021	Brawl	"Zindagani"	Ankit Kholia	Ankit Kholia	
2023	Ishq Mein Doob Jaunga	Ishq Mein Doob Jaunga	Avishek Majumder	Jairaj Selwan	Anweshaa
2025	Humein Asha Hai	Humein Asha Hai	Rahul R, Santosh Nair	Rahul R	
