= List of awards and nominations received by KK =

KK awards and nominations
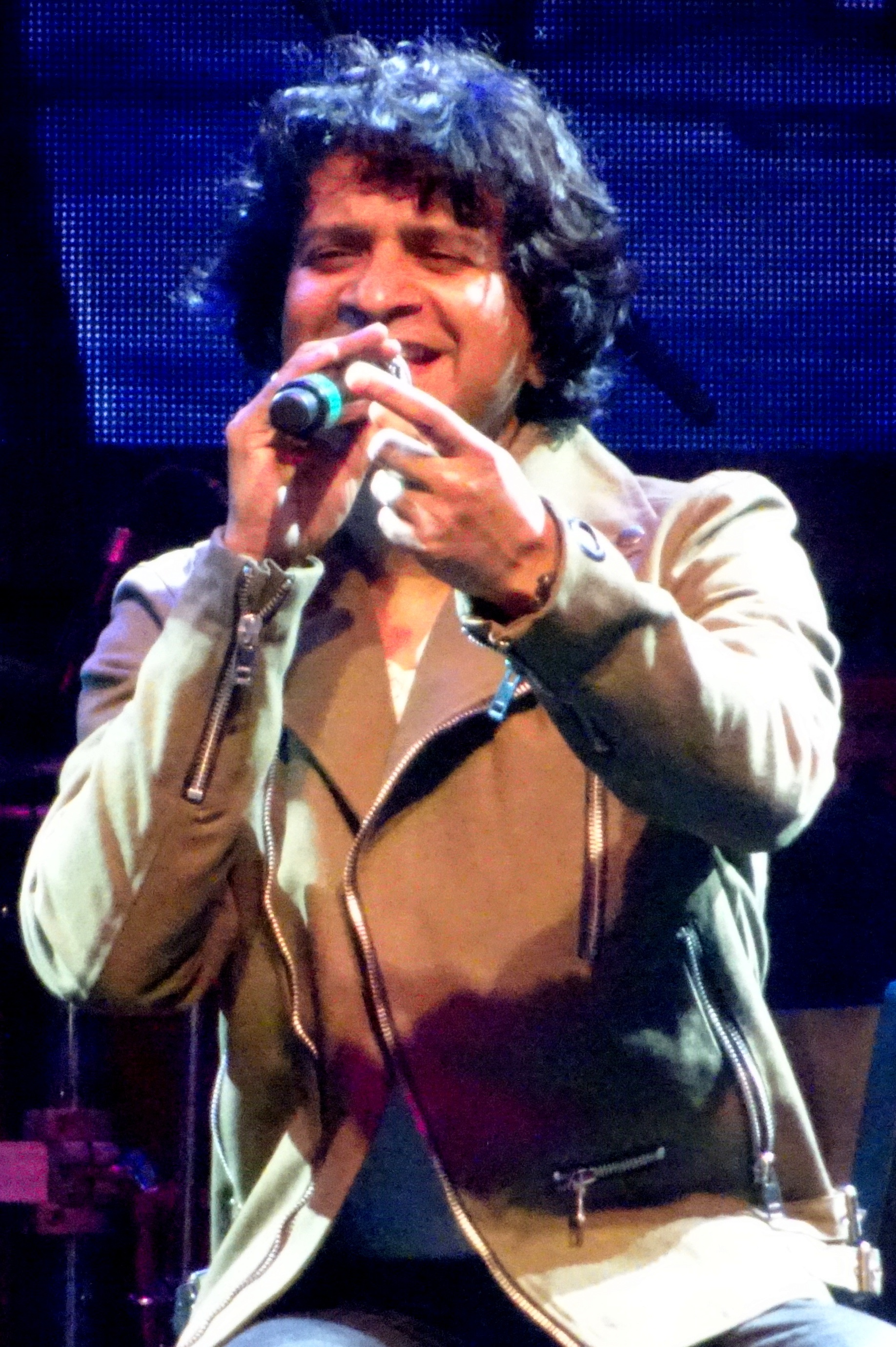
- KK at a concert in 2016
Awards and nominations
Award	Wins	Nominations
Filmfare Awards	0	6
Screen Awards	2	6
International Indian Film Academy Awards	0	6
Mirchi Music Awards	1	1
Zee Cine Awards	0	3
RMIM Puraskaar	4	5
Other Awards	4	9

Totals (Note: Certain award groups do not simply award one winner. They acknowledge several different recipients, have runners-up, and have third place. Since this is a specific recognition and is different from losing an award, runner-up mentions are considered wins in this award tally. For simplification and to avoid errors, each award in this list has been presumed to have had a prior nomination.)
- Wins: 11
- Nominations: 36

Krishnakumar Kunnath (23 August 1968 – 31 May 2022), popularly known as KK, was an Indian playback singer. He recorded songs primarily in Hindi, Tamil, Telugu and Kannada language. Noted for his versatility in a variety of music genres, KK is regarded among the greatest playback singers of India. He was a recipient of two Screen Awards, along with nominations for six Filmfare Awards.

KK received the Screen Awards for Best Singer – Male (non-film music) for his song "Pal" and Screen Award for Best Male Playback for "Khuda Jaane", from the film Bachna Ae Haseeno. In a Hindustan Times interview, KK was asked if he was bothered by being nominated for a number of awards but seldom winning. He said no: "As a singer, I haven't felt any lesser by not getting an award. Winning or not winning an award doesn't affect me. I just like to do my work in the best possible manner. I am happy getting good songs. I am happy not getting awards."

== BIG Star Entertainment Awards ==
Year	Category	Song	Film	Result	Ref.
2010	Most Entertaining Singer – Male	"Zindagi Do Pal KI"	Kites	Nominated	

== Eenam-Swaralaya Awards ==
Year	Category	Song	Film	Result	Ref.
2012	Singer of the Year	All songs	—	Won	

== Filmfare Awards ==
Year	Category	Song	Film	Result	Ref.
2000	Best Male Playback Singer	"Tadap Tadap"	Hum Dil De Chuke Sanam	Nominated	
2003	Best Male Playback Singer	"Bardaasht Nahi Kar Sakta"	Humraaz	Nominated	
2006	Best Male Playback Singer	"Dus Bahane"	Dus	Nominated	
2008	Best Male Playback Singer	"Ajab Si"	Om Shanti Om	Nominated	
2009	Best Male Playback Singer	"Zara Sa"	Jannat	Nominated	
2009	Best Male Playback Singer	"Khuda Jane"	Bachna Ae Haseeno	Nominated	

== FOI Online Awards ==
Year	Category	Song	Film	Result	Ref.
2021	Best Playback Singer – Male	"Aur Tanha"	Love Aaj Kal	Won	

== Global Indian Music Academy Awards ==
Year	Category	Song	Film	Result	Ref.
2011	Best Male Playback Singer	"Zindagi Do Pal Ki"	Kites	Nominated	

== Goldie Film Awards ==
Year	Category	Song	Film	Result	Ref.
2013	Best Song	"Chalte Jaana Hain"	Life! Camera Action...	Won	

== Koimoi Bollywood Audience Poll ==
Year	Category	Song	Film	Result	Ref.
2015	Best Male Singer	"Tu Jo Mila"	Bajrangi Bhaijaan	Won	
2020	Best Male Singer	"Aur Tanha"	Love Aaj Kal	Nominated	

== International Indian Film Academy Awards ==
Year	Category	Song	Result	Ref.
2000	Best Playback Singer – Male	"Tadap Tadap" (Hum Dil De Chuke Sanam)	Nominated	
2004	Best Playback Singer – Male	"Tu Aashiqui Hai" (Jhankaar Beats)	Nominated	
2006	Best Playback Singer – Male	"Dus Bahane" (Dus)	Nominated	
2007	Best Playback Singer – Male	"Tu Hi Meri Shab Hai" (Gangster)	Nominated	
2008	Best Playback Singer – Male	"Aankhon Mein Teri" (Om Shanti Om)	Nominated	
2009	Best Playback Singer – Male	"Khuda Jaane" (Bachna Ae Haseeno)	Nominated	

== Mirchi Music Awards ==
Year	Category	Song	Film	Result	Ref.
209	Male Vocalist of The Year	"Khuda Jaane"	Bachna Ae Haseeno	Nominated	
2014	Album of the Year	"Piya Aaye Na"	Aashiqui 2	Won	

== Producer Guilds Film Awards ==
Year	Category	Song	Result	Ref.
2008	Best Playback Singer – Male	"Aankhon Mein Teri" (Om Shanti Om)	Nominated	
2009	Best Playback Singer – Male	"Khuda Jane" (Bachna Ae Haseeno)	Nominated	
2011	Best Playback Singer – Male	"Sajde" (Khatta Meetha)	Nominated	

== RMIM Puraskaar ==
Year	Category	Song	Film	Result	Ref.
2008	Male Singer of the Year	"Khuda Jane"	Bachna Ae Haseeno	Nominated	
2008	Best Sung Song – Duet (with Shilpa Rao)	"Khuda Jane"	Bachna Ae Haseeno	Won	
2019	Best Sung Song – Solo	"Kal Ki Hi Baat Hai"	Chhichhore	Won	
2020	Best Sung Song – Solo	"Aur Tanha"	Love Aaj Kal	Won	
2020	RMIM Sammaan	"Aur Tanha"	Love Aaj Kal	Won	

== Screen Awards ==
Year	Category	Song	Film/Album	Result	Ref.
1999	Best Singer – Male (non-film music)	"Pal"	Pal	Won	
2000	Best Playback Singer – Male	"Tadap Tadap"	Hum Dil De Chuke Sanam	Nominated	
2007	Best Playback Singer – Male	"Tu Hi Meri Shab Hai"	Gangster	Nominated	
2008	Best Playback Singer – Male	"Aankhon Mein Teri"	Om Shanti Om	Nominated	
2009	Best Playback Singer – Male	"Khuda Jaane"	Bachna Ae Haseeno	Won	

== Zee Cine Awards ==
Year	Category	Song	Film	Result	Ref.
2007	Best Playback Singer – Male	"Tu Hi Meri Shab Hai"	Gangster	Nominated	
2008	Best Playback Singer – Male	"Aankhon Mein Teri"	Om Shanti Om	Nominated	
2011	Best Playback Singer – Male	"Zindagi Do Pal KI"	Kites	Nominated	

== Other recognitions ==
Year	Organisation	Category	Result	Ref.
2018	India TV	Top 10 Bollywood Singers	#9	
2022	Google	Top 100 Most Searched Asians	#30	
