= Mehboob Kotwal =

Indian songwriter and poet

- Born: 7 October 1961 (age 64); Bandra West, Mumbai, India
- Occupations: Lyricist, writer

Mehboob Kotwal (born 1961) known professionally simply as Mehboob, is an Indian film lyricist.

== Early life ==
Mehboob was born and brought up in Mumbai, Maharashtra, where he also received his primary education, first in English and later in Urdu.

== Career ==
In 1986, Mehboob met music composer Ismail Darbar who played violin in film orchestras those days. It was Darbar who taught him the difference between poetry and film lyrics. Darbar introduced Mehboob to filmmaker Ram Gopal Varma and he began his songwriting career with Varma's 1992 film Drohi whose music was composed by R.D. Burman. He then worked with A.R. Rahman on Varma's Rangeela. Rahman liked his work and introduced him to Mani Ratnam and Mehboob penned the lyrics for the Hindi (dubbed) version of Bombay. Mehboob went on to work with A.R. Rahman on films such as Thakshak, Doli Saja Ke Rakhna and Dubbed version of Dil Hi Dil Mein. He has also written lyrics for A.R. Rahman's non-film album Maa Tujhe Salaam as well as Mani Ratnam's Yuva.

Mehboob collaborated with Ismail Darbar on Sanjay Leela Bhansali's 1999 film Hum Dil De Chuke Sanam, and on Shakti - The Power in 2002. He has also written the lyrics for Kamaal Khan's Hindi pop album "Kal Raat" (2003) and KK's albums - Pal and Humsafar.

== Filmography ==
- Drohi (1992)
- Rangeela (1995)
- Bombay (1995) - Hindi dubbed version
- Yash (1996)
- Daud (1997)
- Vande Mataram (1997) - Non-film album
- Doli Saja Ke Rakhna (1998)
- Trishakti (1999)
- Thakshak (1999)
- Rockford (1999)
- Hum Dil De Chuke Sanam (1999)
- Kadhalar Dhinam (2000) - Hindi dubbed version
- Khauff (2000)
- One 2 Ka 4 (2001)
- Yeh Raaste Hain Pyaar Ke (2001)
- Grahan (2001)
- Bas Itna Sa Khwaab Hai (2001)
- Desh Devi (2002)
- Shakti - The Power (2002)
- Baaz: A Bird in Danger (2003)
- Tujhe Meri Kasam (2003)
- Calcutta Mail (2003)
- Lakeer (2004)
- Uff Kya Jaadoo Mohabbat Hai (2004)
- Yuva (2004)
- Anniyan (2005) - Hindi dubbed version
- Dil Ne Jise Apna Kaha (2006)
- Holiday (2006)
- Iqraar by Chance (2006)
- Ek Chalis Ki Last Local (2007)
- Apna Asmaan (2007)
- Contract (2008)
- Tahaan (2008)
- Halla Bol (2008)
- Sirf (2008)
- Lamhaa (2010)
- Muskurake Dekh Zara (2010)
- Itra (2015)
- Heropanti 2 (2022)
- Ponniyin Selvan: I (2022) - Hindi dubbed version

== Awards ==
- 1996: Filmfare RD Burman Award for New Music Talent - Rangeela
