= Humsafar (album) =

Studio album by KK
- Released: 22 January 2008
- Length: 50:20
- Label: Sony BMG

KK chronology
Pal (1999)	Humsafar (2008)

Humsafar (transl. Companion) is the second album sung by KK released on 22 January 2008. The music was composed by KK himself and lyrics were by Mehboob in Hindi, and KK in English. An audio launch party event was held, where KK mainly presented the event. Apart from him, other singers such as Mahalakshmi Iyer, Sunidhi Chauhan, Shibani Kashyap, Raageshwari, Kailash Kher, Colonial Cousins, Shankar Mahadevan, and others also attended the event.

== Overview ==
Humsafar, came eight years after the release of KK's super-hit debut album Pal. It belongs to the pop-rock genre and has a total of 10 songs.

Humsafar has two additional songs — "Din Ho Ya Raat" and "Mehki Hawa"—from Pal, KK's earlier album. The album has a fun-filled romantic number—"Aasman Ke", featuring the singer and a south Indian model, Suhasi Goradia Dhami, in the video. "Humsafar", the title track, an interplay of English and Hindi lyrics, is about one's conscience and how it is a constant companion in the journey of life.

One of the songs, "Yeh Kahan", was penned seven years before the release and "Dekho Na", a rock number, was written six years ago. The rest of the six songs came about in the last two years before the release. Other songs in the album include "Rain Bhai Kaari", a mix of Bengali Baul with rock and a tinge of S. D. Burman, and "Cineraria", a fun-filled English ballad. KK's 13-year-old son, Nakul, also sang a song "Masti" in the album with his father.

== Track listing ==
No.	Title	Lyrics	Music	Length
1.	"Aasman Ke"	Mehboob	KK	4:19
2.	"Dekho Na"	Mehboob	KK	4:02
3.	"Yeh Kahan Mil Gaye Hum"	KK	KK	5:27
4.	"Rain Bhai Kaari (Maajhi)"	Mehboob	KK	5:37
5.	"Masti" (Featuring: Nakul Krishna)	Mehboob	KK	4:28
6.	"Humsafar"	KK, Mehboob	KK	4:48
7.	"Deewana Hai Mera Dil"	Mehboob	KK	4:27
8.	"Cineraria"	KK	KK	6:57
9.	"Din Ho Ya Raat"	Mehboob	Lesle Lewis	5:32
10.	"Mehki Hawa"	Mehboob	Lesle Lewis	4:43
