= Pal (album) =

Studio album by KK
- Released: 16 April 1999
- Genre: Indipop
- Length: 40:06
- Language: Hindi
- Label: Sony Music
- Producer: Lesle Lewis

KK chronology
Pal (1999)	Humsafar (2008)

Lesle Lewis chronology
The Way We Do It (1998)	Pal (1999)	Yeh Mera Dil (2000)

Pal (transl. Moment) is the debut solo album by Indipop playback singer KK. It was released on 16 April 1999 by Sony. The album was arranged and produced by Lesle Lewis while lyrics were written by Mehboob. All tracks were sung by KK.

In 2008, after a gap of eight years, KK released his second album Humsafar.

== Background ==
The lyrics are by Mehboob, while the music was composed by Lesle Lewis. After its release in 1999, it was an instant hit, and brought much recognition to KK.

With no formal training to count, KK released the album Pal with support from his friend, Lesle Lewis in Mumbai. The songs—"Aap Ki Dua", "Yaaron" and the title-track "Pyaar ke Pal" in no time ruled the lips of the youngsters and KK's quick march to celebrity-hood commenced.

== Track listing ==
All lyrics are written by Mehboob; all music is composed by Lesle Lewis.

No.	Title	Length
1.	"Aap Ki Dua"	4:18
2.	"Yaaron"	4:33
3.	"Pyar Ke Pal"	6:02
4.	"Dil Se Mat Khel"	5:04
5.	"Yeh Tanhai"	4:26
6.	"Mehki Hawa"	4:43
7.	"Ishara"	5:28
8.	"Din Ho Ya Raat"	5:32

== Reception ==
All the songs from the album were massive hits all over India. Singer KK always considered the title track as his best song so far, and has performed it at numerous live shows and concerts.

KK won the Star Screen Award for best singer for the song "Pal".
