= KK (singer) =

Indian playback singer (1968–2022)

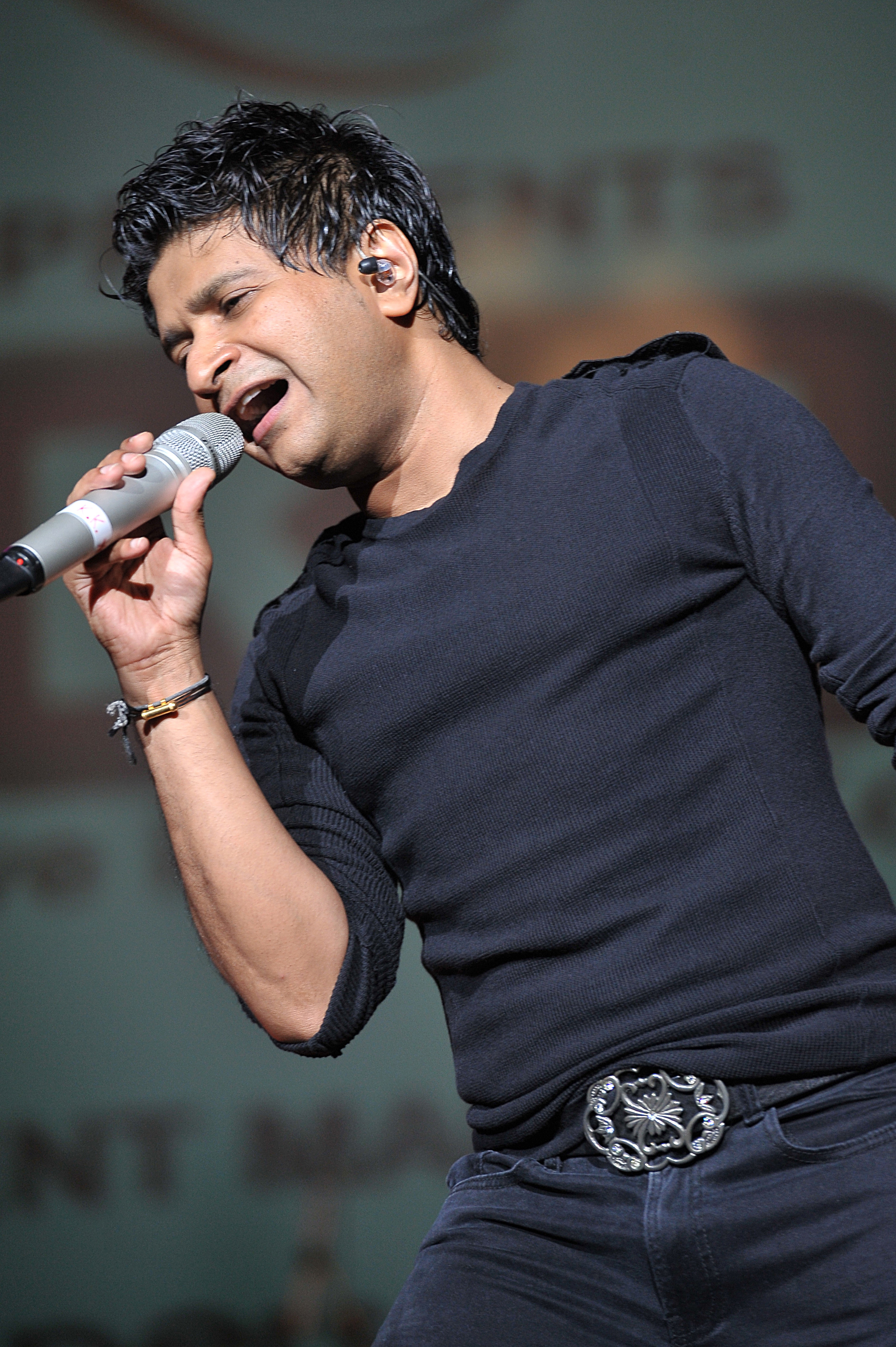
- KK performing at the Jockey Club Auditorium in Hong Kong, 2012
- Born: Krishnakumar Kunnath; 23 August 1968; Delhi, India
- Died: 31 May 2022 (aged 53); Kolkata, West Bengal, India
- Education: Kirori Mal College (University of Delhi)
- Occupations: Playback singer; composer; songwriter; performer
- Years active: 1994–2022
- Spouse: Jyothy Krishna (m. 1991)
- Children: 2
- Musical career
- Genres: Pop; Rock; Soft Rock; Ballad; Blues; Bollywood music
- Instruments: Vocals, Drums
- Labels: Sony Music, T-Series, Tips Music, Universal Music India, YRF Music, Saregama, Madhura Entertainment

Krishnakumar Kunnath (23 August 1968 – 31 May 2022), popularly known as KK, was an Indian playback singer. KK is regarded as one of the greatest playback singers in India. Noted for his versatility in a variety of music genres, he recorded songs primarily in Hindi, Telugu, Tamil, Kannada and Malayalam language. KK was a recipient of several accolades including two Screen Awards, along with six Filmfare Awards nominations.

KK began his career by singing advertising jingles and made his film debut in 1996 with a song in Maachis. KK released his debut album, Pal in 1999. The songs "Pal" and "Yaaron" from the album became popular, and are used in school graduations. The album turned out to be his career breakthrough. The song "Tadap Tadap Ke" from the 1999 film Hum Dil De Chuke Sanam, earned him his first Filmfare Award for Best Male Playback Singer nomination.

KK went onto establish himself as one of the leading singers of the 2000s with successful songs in various languages. His most popular songs include — "Koi Kahe Kehta Rahe" from Dil Chahta Hai (2001), "O Humdum Suniyo Re" from Saathiya (2002), "Dola Re Dola" from Devdas (2002), "Uyirin Uyirae" from Kaaka Kaaka (2003), "Apadi Podu" from Ghilli (2004), "Dus Bahane" from Dus (2005), "Kya Mujhe Pyaar Hai" from Woh Lamhe... (2006), "Tu Hi Meri Shab Hai" from Gangster: A Love Story (2006), "Ajab Si" from Om Shanti Om (2007), "Khuda Jane" from Bachna Ae Haseeno (2008), "Zara Sa" from Jannat (2008), "Sajde" from Khatta Meetha (2010), "Piya Aaye Na" from Aashiqui 2 (2013), "Mat Aazma Re" from Murder 3 (2013), "India Wale" from Happy New Year (2014), and "Tu Jo Mila" from Bajrangi Bhaijaan (2015).

KK was popularly known as "The Mesmerizer", for his romantic songs. KK received the Screen Awards for Best Singer – Male (non-film music) for his song "Pal" and Best Playback Singer – Male for "Khuda Jaane", from the film Bachna Ae Haseeno.

== Early life and work ==
Krishnakumar Kunnath was born on 23 August 1968 in Delhi to Malayali Nair parents, Kanakavalli Kunnath and C. S. Nair. He grew up in New Delhi. He got his family name, Kunnath, through matrilineal succession. He sang 3,500 jingles before breaking into Bollywood.

KK attended Delhi's Mount St Mary's School, and Kirori Mal College, Delhi University. He appeared in the song "Josh of India", released to support the Indian national team during the 1999 Cricket World Cup.

After receiving a degree in commerce from Kirori Mal College, KK spent six months as a marketing executive before pursuing his love of music. He struggled to establish himself in the competitive recording industry, singing at hotels to make ends meet. KK moved to Mumbai in 1994.

== Career ==
=== Playback singing ===
In 1994, KK gave a demo tape to Louis Banks, Ranjit Barot and Lesle Lewis. He was called by UTV, and sang a jingle for a Santogen Suiting ad. In a four-year period, KK sang over 3,500 jingles in 11 languages. He considered Lesle Lewis his mentor for giving him his first jingle to sing in Mumbai. KK then became a playback singer, beginning with A. R. Rahman's songs, "Kalluri Saalai" and "Hello Dr.", from Kathir's Kadhal Desam (1996) and "Strawberry Kannae" from AVM Productions's 1997 musical film, Minsara Kanavu.

==== Hindi ====
KK made his Bollywood debut with the song "Tadap Tadap Ke Is Dil Se" in Hum Dil De Chuke Sanam (1999). Before this song, however, he had sung parts of "Chhod Aaye Hum" in Gulzar's Maachis (1996). KK considered "Tadap Tadap Ke Is Dil Se" the turning point of his career. Other popular songs included "Dola Re Dola" in Devdas (2002), "Kya Mujhe Pyaar Hai" in Woh Lamhe... (2006), "Aankhon Mein Teri" in Om Shanti Om (2007), "Khuda Jane" in Bachna Ae Haseeno (2008), "Piya Aaye Na" in Aashiqui 2 (2013), "Mat Aazma Re" in Murder 3 (2013), "India Wale" in Happy New Year (2014) and "Tu Jo Mila" from Bajrangi Bhaijaan (2015).

KK received six Filmfare Awards nominations for his songs: "Tadap Tadap", "Bardaasht Nahi Kar Sakta", "Dus Bahane", "Ajab Si", "Zara Sa" and "Khuda Jane". He received the 2009 Screen Award for Best Playback Singer – Male for "Khuda Jaane", from the film Bachna Ae Haseeno. In 2022, KK worked with filmmaker Srijit Mukherji and lyricist Gulzar on a song for Sherdil: The Pilibhit Saga. The song, "Dhoop Paani Bahne De", was the first song released since his death.

==== Tamil ====
KK sang popular songs in several languages, including Tamil. According to Outlook, his songs defined Tamil film music during the 2000s and became part of Tamil culture. In 2004, KK's Tamil song "Appadi Podu" became popular across India and was played at clubs and weddings. He worked with A. R. Rahman on "Strawberry Kanne", a popular song, in 1997.

He had a decade of hit songs during the 2000s. KK sang "Love Pannu" for Harris Jayaraj in 2001, followed by "Kadhal Oru Thani Katchi" and "Gundu Gundu Ponne". In 2003, he had two hits composed by Harris Jayaraj: "Uyirin Uyire" and "Kalyanam Dhaan Kattitkittu". "Uyirin Uyire" was popular in cities, and "Kalyanam Dhaan Kattitkittu" became popular across Tamil Nadu.

KK sang "Kadhal Valarthen", composed by Yuvan Shankar Raja. He worked with Harris Jayaraj and Yuvan Shankar Raja to produce two hit songs: "Kadhalikkum Aasai" and "Ninaithu Ninaithu". "Andankaaka Kondaikaari", composed by Harris Jayaraj, was another successful song. KK sang "Annanoda Paatu" in the film Chandramukhi. Other Tamil hit songs by were "Pani Thuli", "Olikuchi Udambukari", and "Lelakku Lelakku Lela". Despite his birth to a Malayali family in Thrissur, KK sang only one Malayalam song in his 25-year career: "Rahasyamay" in Puthiya Mukham (2009).

=== Albums ===
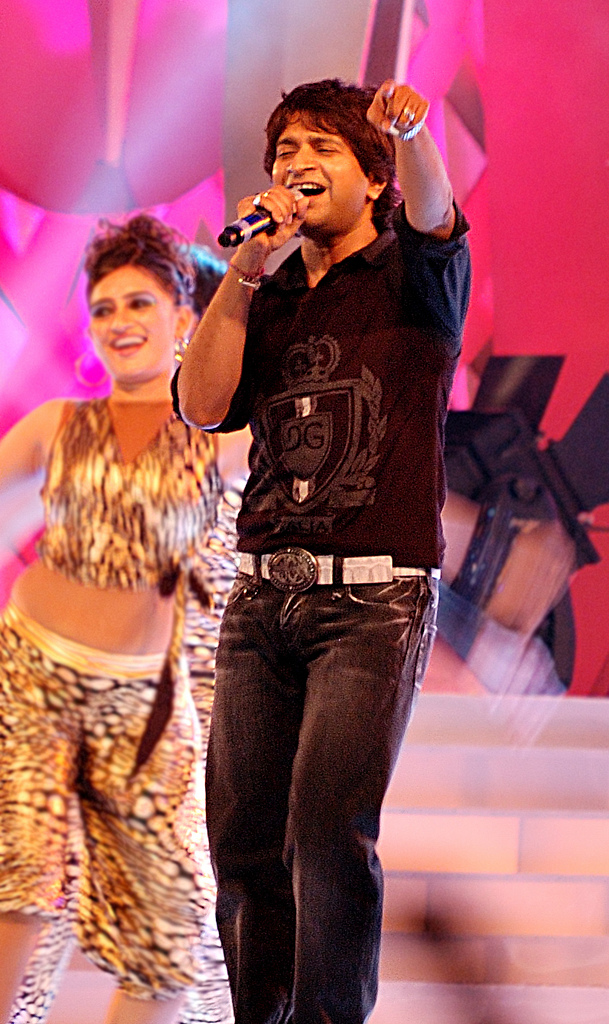
KK at a concert in 2009

In 1999, Sony Music had been launched in India and wanted to introduce a new artist. KK was selected, and released his debut solo album: Pal, with music by Lesle Lewis of the duo Colonial Cousins (who also arranged and produced the album). Pal was a pop rock album. and the songs "Aap Ki Dua", "Yaaron" and the title track, "Pal" were popular with audiences and on the music charts; "Pal" and "Yaaron" are frequently played at school farewells. KK received the 1999 Screen Award for Best Singer – Male (non-film music) for the album.

He released his next album, Humsafar, on 22 January 2008. Humsafar featured "Aasman Ke", "Dekho Na", "Yeh Kahan Mil Gaye Hum", "Rain Bhai Kaari (Maajhi)", and the English-language ballad "Cineraria". The lyrics of its title track are a mixture of English and Hindi, and eight songs on the album were composed by KK.

=== Television ===
He sang many songs for television serials, including Just Mohabbat, Shaka Laka Boom Boom, Kuch Jhuki Si Palkein, Hip Hip Hurray, Kkavyanjali and Just Dance. KK was a jury member on the talent-hunt show, Fame Gurukul.

He sang "Tanha Chala" on the Pakistani TV show The Ghost, which aired on Hum TV in 2008. The song was composed by Farrukh Abid and Shoaib Farrukh, with lyrics by Momina Duraid.

KK appeared on the MTV India musical programme Coke Studio, singing the qawwali "Chadta Suraj" with the Sabri Brothers and a reprise of "Tu Aashiqui Hai" from Jhankaar Beats. He appeared on Surili Baat, on the Aaj Tak channel. KK performed on Sony Mix and MTV Unplugged, which aired on MTV on 11 January 2014. He presented his Salaam Dubai 2014 concert in Dubai in April 2014, and performed in concert in Goa, Dubai, Chennai and Hong Kong.

On 29 August 2015, KK appeared in season two of the television singing-reality show Indian Idol Junior as a judge and guest jury member. On 13 September of that year, he appeared on the Sony Mix show Baaton Baaton Mein. In a 2019 Hindustan Times interview, KK said that he was active in the music industry with live performances and playback singing. Live performances made him happy; he did not want to abandon his "commitment to the audience", and wanted to release a new album after the 2008 success of his second album.

== Personal life ==
KK married his childhood friend Jyothy Krishna in 1991. His son, Nakul, sang "Masti" (from his album, Humsafar) with him. KK also has a daughter, named Taamara.

== Artistry ==
=== Vocals and musical style ===
KK had no formal musical training. According to film director Mahesh Bhatt, "KK had an emotional bandwidth which echoed all the seasons of the heart. He could be frivolous, romantic and anguished. He could go into the depths, talk about the wonder and magic of life."

KK believed that it was unimportant for a singer's face to be seen, but "a singer must be heard". In a 2019 interview, he said that he felt comfortable with a microphone but awkward in front of a camera. KK valued and "fiercely" protected his privacy. He did not want his singing to be associated with a particular actor and preferred singing for a number of actors. He is widely regarded as a highly versatile singer. Elaborating on his singing style, Ilina Acharya of Film Companion noted: "KK's smooth, honey-textured voice flowed like water. It could project any tone and tenor. He could mould his pitch to reach and resonate with the ups and downs of the human experience."

=== Inspiration ===
KK has often termed legendary singer Kishore Kumar as his inspiration. On not taking any formal training, KK stated his idol as one of the reason and added, "From the beginning, I was able to learn a song by just hearing it, it is something that I’ve been blessed with. I later learned that Kishoreda had never learned music, so I had even more reasons to not go to a music class." Sneha Bengani from CNBC TV18 compared him to his inspiration and noted, "Much like Kumar’s, KK’s songs are standalone entities too, larger than the films or the albums they belong to."

== Impact and recognition ==
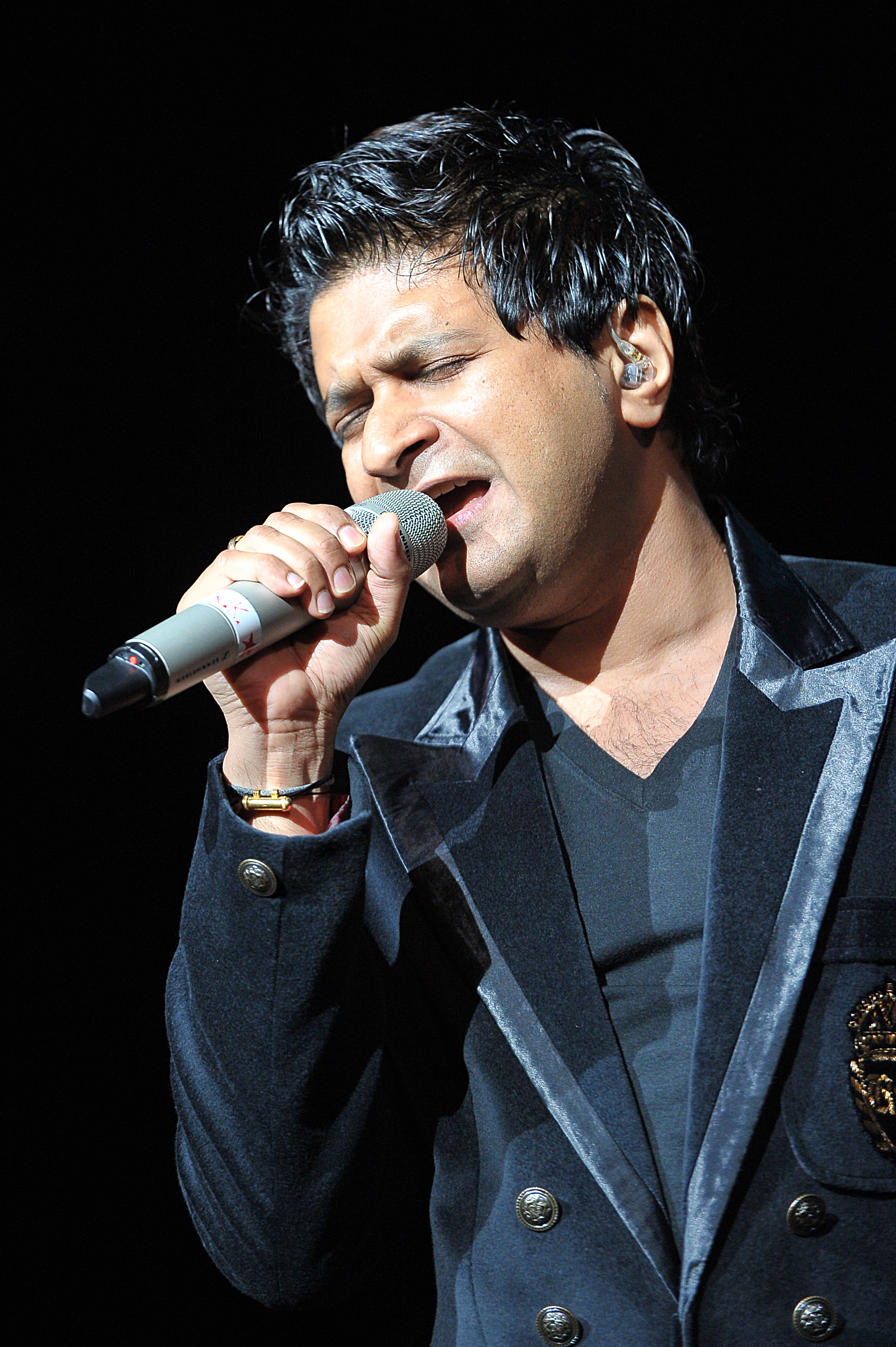
KK at an event in 2012

KK is described in the media as one of the most popular and versatile singers of Indian cinema. S. R. Praveen termed him a "rare Malayali singer" who made it big in Bollywood. India TV placed him in its "Top 10 Bollywood Singers" of all time list. KK was placed 30th in Google's "Top 100 Most Searched Asians" list of 2022. A total of nine songs of KK were placed in BBC's "Top 40 Bollywood Soundtracks of all time" list.

KK's work has received praises from several artists. Arijit Singh considered KK as his favourite singer and mentor. In 2023, Singh gave a tribute to him and sang his song "Dil Ibadat" in one of his concert. Calling him a "path-breaking singer", Abhijeet Bhattacharya added, "KK was a trendsetting singer, which still continues. He was the last playback singer we had… those who came after him, I don’t count them as playback singers. His songs were written for the screen and heroes." Anupam Roy called KK his idol and added that he was a "livewire performer", who drew his energy from the crowd. Shaan praised KK's work ethics and added, "We had some of our best times while recording songs together or while performing on stage. KK was very disciplined. He’d be on time and his preparation – for a song recording or stage show – was always on point. We did some great duets together." Sunidhi Chauhan called him her favourite and added, "I used to go insane with KK on stage and I will never forget the few shows we have done together. I am personally a fan of KK, so much so that I would love to be a little bit of KK."

Several other artists such as A. R. Rahman, Richa Sharma, Amit Mishra, Usha Uthup, Shreya Ghosal, Sonu Nigam, Vishal Dadlani and Mohit Chauhan have often praised his musical abilities and songs. Many actors have also termed KK their favourite. Pankaj Tripathi stated, "I have been a huge fan of KK, he is one of my favourite singers. The song that he sang is a very soulful and wonderful track." KK sang several songs for Emraan Hashmi who said, "A voice and talent like no other… They don't make them like him anymore. Working on the songs KK sang was always that much more special."

== Illness and death ==
On 31 May 2022, KK performed a concert at a college festival at Nazrul Mancha in South Kolkata. After the concert, he returned to his hotel in Esplanade. He complained of feeling unwell on the way back to his hotel, where he experienced cardiac arrest. He collapsed, and efforts to revive him at the hotel were unsuccessful. KK was rushed to Calcutta Medical Research Institute (CMRI) at about 10:30 pm, where he was declared dead. He was 53 years old.

On 1 June 2022, Kolkata Police registered a case of unnatural death to investigate KK's death. His autopsy was videographed; the report cited myocardial infarction (heart attack) as the probable cause of death, ruling out foul play. According to the doctor who conducted the autopsy, KK could have survived if he had received cardiopulmonary resuscitation (CPR) immediately after losing consciousness. He had complained to his wife about pain in his shoulder and arm for several days before his death, thinking it was caused by digestive problems. According to the autopsy report, KK's heart had an 80-percent blockage. Three public interest litigations (PILs) related to the singer's death were registered in the Calcutta High Court.

=== Funeral ===
KK was given a gun salute by the West Bengal government at Rabindra Sadan in Kolkata. West Bengal chief minister Mamata Banerjee was present for the salute; film- and music-industry figures and politicians, including Prime Minister Narendra Modi, offered their condolences. KK's remains were brought to Mumbai, and his funeral was held at the Versova Hindu Cemetery on the following day (2 June). It was attended by family members, friends and colleagues.

== Discography ==
"Pal" ("Moments")

Whether we are there tomorrow or not,
These moments will nevertheless be remembered.
Moments - these are moments of love,
Come, come along with me.
Come, what are you thinking,
Life is short
If we do get a tomorrow, it would be good fortune.

— English translation of KK's "Pal", the last song at his final concert

Year	Album(s)	Music director	Ref.
Solo
1999	Pal	Lesle Lewis	
2008	Humsafar	KK	
Compilations
2002	Humraaz	Himesh Reshammiya	
2011	Soulful Voice KK	Various	
2014	#Now Playing: KK Hits	Various	
2013	KK: Best Of Me	Various	
2015	Musical Bond: Pritam & KK	Pritam Chakraborty	

== Filmography ==
=== Television ===
Year	Title	Role	Notes	Ref.
2005	Fame Gurukul	Jury member		
2011	Coke Studio 1	Himself	Episode: 1,7	
2014	Surili Baat	Himself		
2015	Indian Idol Junior 2	Judge	Guest appearance	
2015	Baaton Baaton Mein	Himself		

== Accolades ==
In a Hindustan Times interview, KK was asked if he was bothered by being nominated for a number of awards but seldom winning. He said no: "As a singer, I haven't felt any lesser by not getting an award. Winning or not winning an award doesn't affect me. I just like to do my work in the best possible manner. I am happy getting good songs. I am happy not getting awards."

== Tribute and honours ==
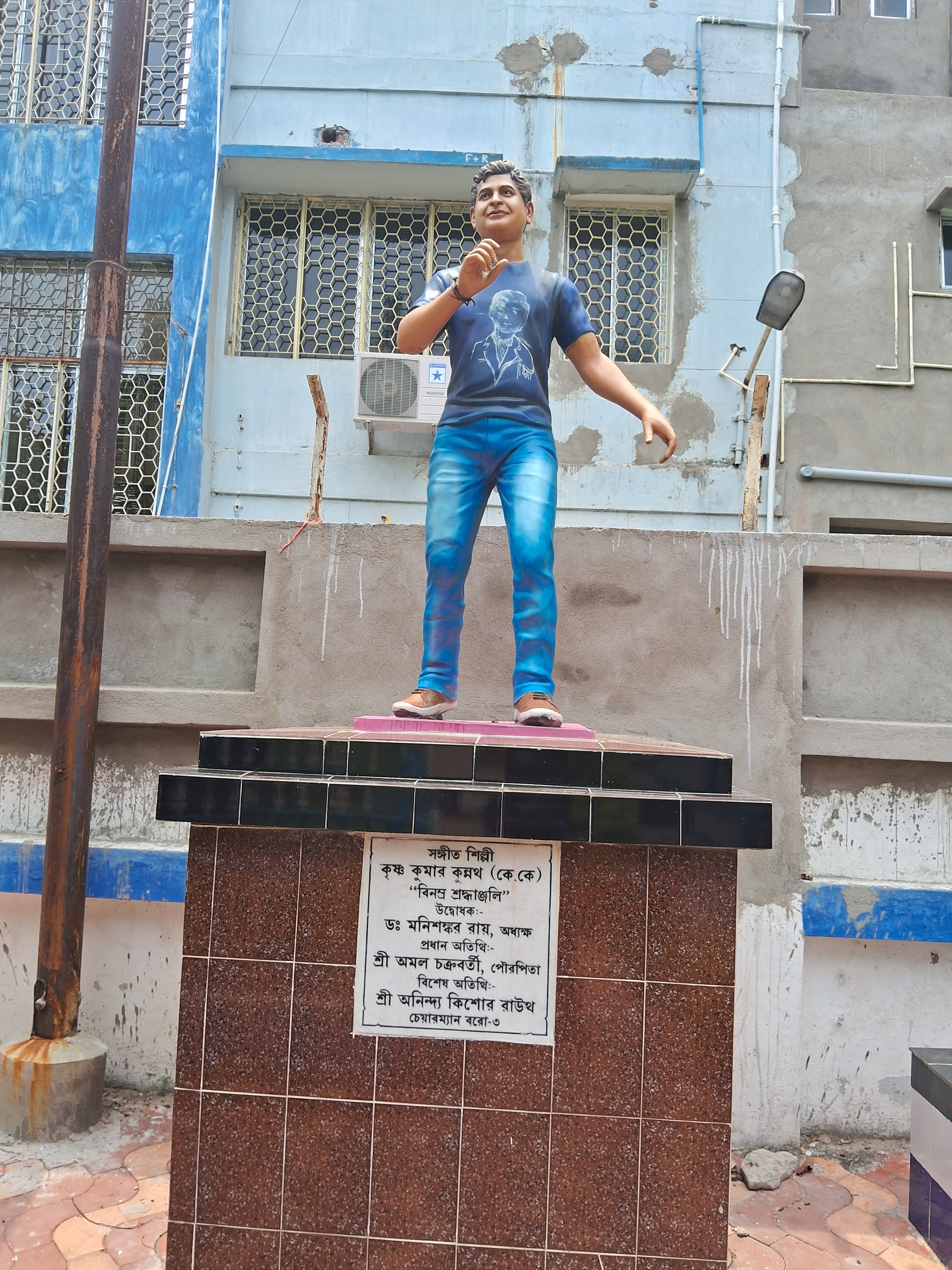
KK's statue installed in 2023, at the place where he gave his last performance

Reporting KK's death, Deccan Herald called him the "voice of love". According to The Times of India, he was Bollywood's most versatile singer. An article in The Hindu said, "Till the end, he remained a rage in the concert circuit and will be remembered as the singer who became the voice of the heart".

In 2023, a statue of KK was installed at Gurudas Mahavidyalaya in Kolkata, the same place where he performed his last concert. Several singers like Arijit Singh, Raageshwari, Shaan, Sunidhi Chauhan, Sonu Nigam, Shilpa Rao, Zubeen Garg and others have given a tribute to KK, by singing his songs during their concerts.

On 25 October 2024, Google honoured him with a Google Doodle to celebrate the anniversary of his debut as a playback singer in 1996 when he sang Chhod Aaye Hum in the film Maachis.

In 2025, Shruti Music School UK released "Humein Asha Hai", recorded by KK in 2008, via Musecoinx, a blockchain platform.
