= Gulfam =

Gulfam may refer to:

- Gulfam (writer) (1861–1936), Gujarati writer
- Gulfam Khan (born 1975), Indian actress
- Gulfam Joseph (born 1999), Pakistani sports shooter
- Gulfam (album), a 1994 album by Hariharan
