= Raajesh Johri =

Indian poet and lyricist

Rajesh Johri
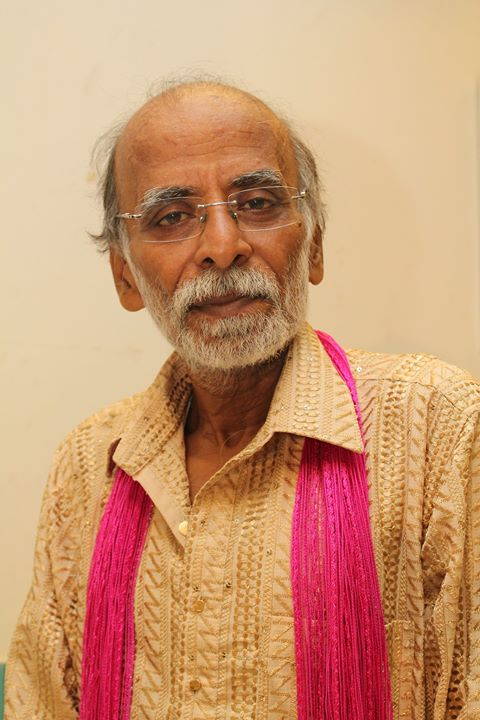
- Johri in 2016
- Born: 19 June 1952; Pilani, Rajasthan, India
- Died: 1 March 2017 (aged 64); Mumbai, Maharashtra, India
- Education: M.sc in Physics
- Occupations: Poet, lyricist, Scriptwriter, Compere
- Years active: 1972–2017
- Spouse: Archana Johri (m. 1986)

Signature
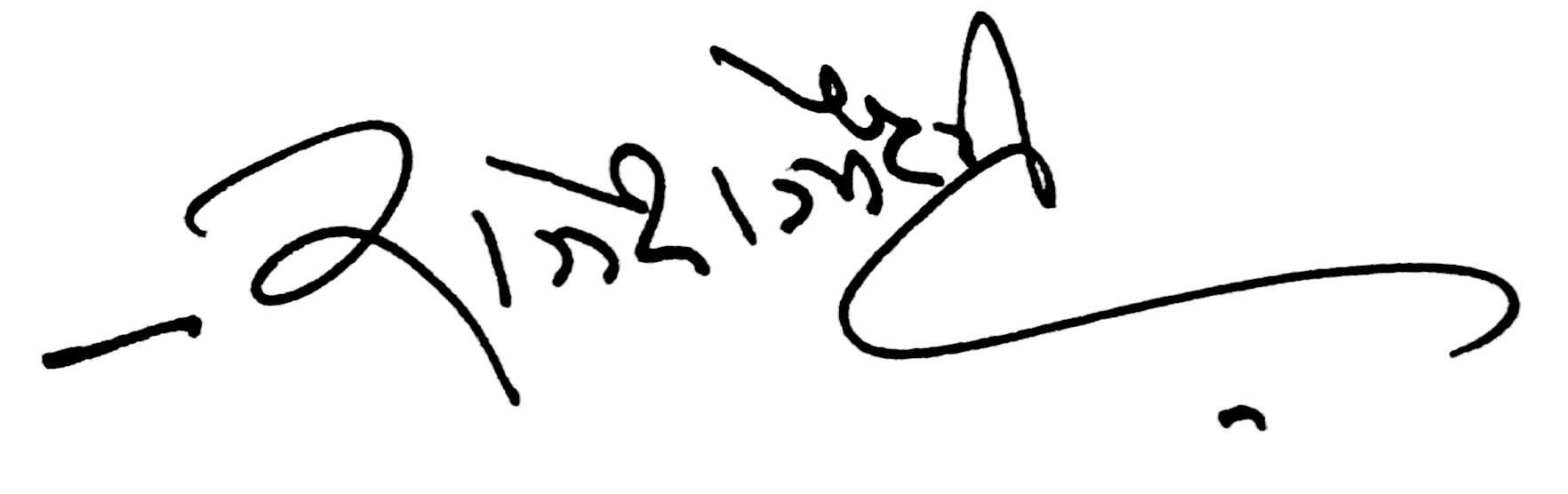

Rajesh Johri (Hindi: राजेश जौहरी راجیش سنار; 19 June 1952 – 1 March 2017) was an Indian poet, Lyricist, Ad Film Maker, Voice Over Artist, and Anchor based in Mumbai.

== Early life and education ==
Rajesh belonged to Uttar Pradesh and was born in 1952 in Pilani. His father, Dr. A. N. Johri, was a professor of English Literature and an author, and his mother, Chandra Johri, was well-educated. Rajesh was the youngest of three brothers and also had two sisters. Artistically inclined from a very young age, he penned his first poem at the age of 10. He had a deep interest in music and literature. In one of his interviews, he was quoted saying that his father's paternal grandmother, Heera Kunwar, used to pen bhajans in praise of Lord Krishna, and that she is who he got it from.

Rajesh received his primary education from Pilani in Rajasthan and since his father was in a transferable job, he travelled during his childhood to Chandausi, Khurja and finally, Saharanpur where he completed his graduation in science stream from Jain College, in 1972. His parents' dream was that he would become an engineer, and so they enrolled him for an MSc course in physics. However, following his passion for writing, one day before his 20th birthday, he boarded a train to Mumbai from Saharanpur for the purpose of fulfilling his creative dreams. Having no connection whatsoever with the music industry leading to a single-handed struggle, he left for his journey to the city of his dreams.

== Career ==
=== 1972–1990 ===
Rajesh Johri's first song was sung by Chandru Aatma, "Chanchal Nain Tihare" and soon after that his career picked up wonderfully, crossing milestone after milestone. Soon after this bhajan, "Hari ka Dhyaan Laga", "Mere Shyaam Tera Naam" and "Mann Re Tan Hai Dukh Ka Gaon" were sung by Mohammed Rafi which became quite popular. Johri gave his voice for numerous ad-jingles of that era namely Ajanta watches for Ajanta Group, Nescafe, and "Vardhman Knitting Yarn" For Vardhman Group of Companies. He worked closely with Pandit Vinod Sharma and voice-over legend Ameen Sayani whom he considered his mentors. He was a regular anchor for Sur Singar Samsad in which he shared stage with the best of artists and musicians such as Bismillah Khan, Ram Narayan, Kavita Krishnamurthy, Suresh Wadkar, and others. Johri Penned numerous bhajans for Anup Jalota of which "Hey Sharde Maa", "Tere Tan Mein Ram", "Jo Tu Mitaana Chahe" and many more. Another very popular album by Johri was "Baby Doll" by Alisha Chinai.

=== 1990–2017 ===
Johri created a niche for himself in the world of Indian pop. The album Halka Nasha was very well received, which had ghazals sung by Hariharan. The song "Sa Ni Dha Pa" from the Colonial Cousins, a fusion album by Hariharan and Lewis, was the first ever offering that was a part of MTV Unplugged. He worked for many online projects in this era of online channels, giving his services as a lyricist, voice over artist and also as a brand ambassador for teleshopping product English Guru. His notable works include "Asian Sky Shop", Theme Songs for Border Security Force, Delhi Police and many more. He designed programs for online radio channel "2B! Radio" and also contributed as a voice-over artist and a scriptwriter.

=== Discography ===
He was credited as a lyricist for the film Thank You for Coming (2023), the song "Pari Hoon Main" is remake version of the famous Suneeta Rao's song "Paree Hoon Main" from the album Dhuan (1991).

== Personal life ==
Rajesh married Archana Johri, a scriptwriter, anchor and poet in the year 1986. He had two daughters, Ratika Johri and Rashee Johri. The elder one, Ratika is a singer and lending her voice for many albums, serials and films. The younger one, Rashee is an anchor, choreographer, director and founder of an event company - 'Zodiac events'.

== Death ==
Johri suffered from kidney disease in the last few years of his life. As a result, he suffered cardiac arrest on 1 March 2017 and died at the Bhartiya Aaroya Nidhi Hospital in Mumbai.
