= Keka (2008 film) =

- DVD cover
- Directed by: Teja
- Written by: Teja
- Produced by: Teja; K. Jagadeesh Reddy
- Starring: Ajay; Anoop Kumar; Ishana
- Cinematography: P. C. Sreeram
- Edited by: Shankar
- Music by: Chakri
- Release date: 26 October 2008
- Country: India
- Language: Telugu

Keka (transl. Scream) is a 2008 Indian Telugu-language romantic drama film directed by Teja and starring Ajay, Anoop Kumar and Ishana. The film was released to highly negative reviews.

== Cast ==
- Ajay as Raja
- Anoop Kumar as Kiran
- Ishana as Sujata
- Soumya as Meghna
- Dharmavarapu Subramanyam as Constable
- Rallapalli as Doctor
- Thalaivasal Vijay as Kiran's father
- Nimu Bhowmik as Head of orphanage
- Duvvasi Mohan as Orphanage Helper
- Vaiyapuri as Police Inspector
- Mayilsamy as Shopkeeper

Dubbing artists

- Navdeep for Raja
- Ajay for Kiran
- Raasi for Ishana

== Production ==
The film featured 36 newcomers including Sirivennela Seetharama Sastry's son Raja. Bubbly was renamed Ishana by Teja although officially she is unnamed by her family due to astrological reasons. Initially Chennai-based Ilaiyaraaja was to compose the music but after Teja fell sick and couldn't shift between cities, he opted for Hyderabad-based Chakri. The film was shot in 60 days in Bangalore, Kolkata, Hyderabad and Rajasthan. The film was simultaneously shot in Tamil as Manase Manase, but that version was never released.

== Soundtrack ==
All music is composed by Chakri.

Soundtrack
No.	Title	Lyrics	Singer(s)	Length
1.	"Jhum Jhum Jhummani"	Sirivennela Seetharama Sastry	Venu, Pranavi
2.	"Adigava Mataina"	Sirivennela Seetharama Sastry	Hemachandra, Kousalya
3.	"Gayalu Palike Geyam"	Chandrabose	Harshika, Sudha
4.	"Keka Petti Keka Petti"	Chandrabose	Chakri
5.	"Love You I Love You"	Chandrabose	Chakri
6.	"Chitti Chilakavo"	Veturi	Hariharan, Kousalya

== Reception ==
The film was released on 26 October 2008. A critic from Rediff.com rated the film two-and-a-half out of five stars and wrote that "Director Teja seems to have got embroiled in the stereotypical pattern of filmmaking. Gone is the freshness associated with his films (as his earlier films Chitram and Jayam reflect). One can't help but wonder if he has lost his touch". A critic from IANS rated the film one out of five and wrote that "Keka is a movie three years too late".
