= Kathikappal =

- Directed by: Dinesh Selvaraj
- Written by: Dinesh Selvaraj
- Produced by: V. Bhakta
- Starring: V. N. Anoop Kumar; Meera Vasudevan; Poornitha
- Cinematography: Abdul Kalam
- Edited by: K. M. K. Palanivel
- Music by: Sree Sai
- Production company: Gajanana Movies
- Release date: 25 July 2008
- Running time: 115 minutes
- Country: India
- Language: Tamil

Kathikappal (transl. Paper Boat) is a 2008 Indian Tamil-language thriller film written and directed by Dinesh Selvaraj in his debut. The film stars V. N. Anoop Kumar, Meera Vasudevan and Poornitha, with Chandrabose, Thalaivasal Vijay, Prem, Thennavan, Jayaprakasam, Sakthivel and Vinoth Kumar playing supporting roles. It was released on 25 July 2008.

== Plot ==
Set in 1988, the notorious forest brigand Veeraiyyan abducted a former minister and held him captive in the forest of Kodaikanal. To release him, Veeraiyyan demanded a ransom of 3 crores. Police Commissioner Chandrabose and his squad – Thennavan, Jayaprakash, Sakthivel, and Vinoth Kumar – killed Veeraiyyan, but they could not save the minister, and in the process, the respected doctor Pari Vallal was shot dead. Pari Vallal worked in a remote village to exercise his profession. He met the orphan Sara, who grew up in a church and decided to assist him. They fell in love with each other and got married.

In 2008, during the annual death ceremony of Pari Vallal in Kodaikanal, an injured Joshua Prakash appears and proclaims to be the Pari Vallal in his previous birth. Sara, Pari Vallal's widow who now lives with her adopted daughter Kabini, is astonished and could not believe it. The inhabitants, who think it was a practical joke, beat Joshua Prakash up and tie him with a rope to control him. The next day, Mallika comes to the village and claims to be Joshua Prakash's wife. After their marriage, Joshua Prakash claimed to be Pari Vallal and told that his parents locked him in a room for 12 years. The villagers first cannot believe him, but his perfect recollections of Kodaikanal and its inhabitants baffle many. The psychiatrist Elangovan, Pari Vallal's brother, interviews Joshua Prakash and confirms that he is Pari Vallal. Annoyed by her husband's eccentric behavior, Mallika decides to leave the place, but Joshua Prakash confesses that he loves her and wants to get ahold of the money hidden by Veeraiyyan. Chandrabose and his team track Joshua Prakash and abduct him in a cabin in the woods. They force him to show the place and then find Thennavan's corpse. Sara, armed with a rifle, threatens to kill them.

In 1988, Chandrabose, his squad, and Veeraiyyan were actually partners in crime. Chandrabose and his squad then double-crossed Veeraiyan and killed the minister. Veeraiyyan, who tried to escape, was shot in the back. An injured Veeraiyyan begged Pari Vallal to save him and told him the place where he had hidden the money, but Thennavan killed Pari Vallal and Veeraiyyan died from his injuries.

In 2008, Joshua Prakash reveals that he is not Pari Vallal's rebirth but the son of the minister who was killed by them. With Sara, he has planned to take revenge on Chandrabose and his squad. Joshua Prakash and Sara eventually kill them, and he then tells her to keep the money. The film ends with Joshua Prakash and Mallika adopting Kabini and leaving the village.

== Cast ==
- V. N. Anoop Kumar as Joshua Prakash
- Meera Vasudevan as Sara
- Poornitha as Mallika
- Chandrabose as Chandrabose
- Thalaivasal Vijay as Elangovan
- Prem as Pari Vallal
- Thennavan as Thennavan
- Jayaprakasam as Jayaprakash
- Sakthivel as Sakthivel
- Vinoth Kumar as Vinoth Kumar
- W. Afsar Babu as Police Commissioner
- Baby Prahasitha as Kabini
- Kottai Perumal as Chinnadurai
- Ayyappan Gopi as Church Father
- R. Karthikeyan
- Sathyandra
- Rail Vijayakumar
- Rathnaraj
- Apeksha

== Production ==
Dinesh Selvaraj, erstwhile assistant to Mani Ratnam, made his directorial debut with Kathikappal. V. N. Anoop Kumar, who did a small role in Vattaram and was a dancer, played the lead role in the film in addition to producing it.

== Soundtrack ==
The soundtrack was composed by Sree Sai, with lyrics written by N. Annamalai.

Song	Singer(s)	Duration
"Aal Illa Kaatukulla Vettaiaadava"	Abhilash, Karthika, Kalyani	5:15
"Aiya Vandharu Ithu Nalla Neramthan"	Tippu	5:15
"Idhayame En Idhayame"	Prasanna	4:38
"Swasame Ennthan"	Karthik	5:22
"Theme Music"	-	3:26

== Reception ==
Pavithra Srinivasan of Rediff.com rated the film 1 1/2 out of 5 and said, "It's a pretty short movie but the predominant feeling you get when everything's over is that it could all have gone much better".
