= Online Binline =

2015 film

- Directed by: Kedar Gaekwad
- Written by: Hemant Edlabadkar
- Produced by: Neeta Jadhav; Shreyash P. Jadhav
- Starring: Siddharth Chandekar Hemant Dhome; Rutuja Shinde
- Cinematography: Kedar Prabhakar Gaekwad
- Edited by: Ashish Mhatre; Apurva Motiwale
- Music by: Hrishikesh; Jasraj Joshi; Nilesh Moharir; Saurabh
- Production company: Ganraj Associates
- Release date: 3 July 2015
- Running time: 128 minutes
- Country: India
- Language: Marathi

Online Binline is a 2015 Marathi-language romantic comedy film directed by Kedar Prabhakar Gaekwad. It stars Siddharth Chandekar, Rutuja Shinde and Hemant Dhome in lead roles. The film was theatrically released on 3 July 2015.

== Synopsis ==
Online Binline shows how two friends fall in love with the same girl, and how they set off on a mission to achieve the love of their life, using internet.

== Cast ==
- Siddharth Chandekar as Sid
- Rutuja Shinde as Kimaya
- Hemant Dhome as Idya
- Arun Nalawade as Idya's Father
- Prasad Kamat as Sid's Father
- Pratibha Bhagat as Idya's mother

== Soundtrack ==
Online Binline

Soundtrack album by Hrishikesh, Saurabh, Jasraj, Nilesh Moharir & Lesle Lewis
- Released: 4 June 2015
- Genre: Feature film soundtrack
- Length: 18:38
- Label: Zee Music Company
External audio
- Audio Jukebox on YouTube

The soundtrack is composed by Hrishikesh, Saurabh, Jasraj, Nilesh Moharir and Lesle Lewis while the lyrics were written by Vaibhav Joshi and Mandar Cholkar. Hrishikesh, Saurabh, Jasraj compose only one track of the film and other three tracks composed by Nilesh Moharir. The song Oho Kai Zala song composed arranged by Lesle Lewis written by Shreyash Jadhav and Mandar Cholkar originally written by Munawar Masoom, Milind Joshi exclusively released on 17 June 2015.

No.	Title	Singer(s)	Length
1.	"Re Din Na Na"	Jasraj Joshi	3:44
2.	"Tu Havishi"	Sonu Nigam, Priyanka Barve	4:28
3.	"Gondhal"	Prasenjit Kosambi	2:46
4.	"Haralo Viralo"	Hrishikesh Ranade, Aanandi Joshi (singer)	3:47
5.	"Oho Kai Zhala"	Hariharan, Lesle Lewis, Shreyash Jadhav	3:53
Total length:			18:38

== Critical reception ==
Mihir Bhanage of The Times of India gave the film a rating of 2.5 out of 5 saying that, "There are funny situations, romantic pursuits and a social message to the younger generation- that of preventing mobiles and internet addiction- but weaving this together is where it takes a beating."
