= Colonial Cousins (album) =

Studio album by Colonial Cousins
- Released: 1 October 1996
- Recorded: 1996
- Genre: Indian pop
- Length: 51:31
- Label: Magnasound

Colonial Cousins chronology
Colonial Cousins (1996)	The Way We Do It (1998)

Hariharan chronology
Halka Nasha (1996)	Colonial Cousins (1996)	Paigham (1997)

Lesle Lewis chronology
Bombay Girl (1994)	Colonial Cousins (1996)	Haseena (1998)

Singles from Colonial Cousins
- 1. "Sa Ni Dha Pha" Released: 20 May 1996; 2. "Krishna" Released: 2 February 1997

Colonial Cousins is the debut studio album by Indian duo Colonial Cousins, which is formed by singer Hariharan and singer-composer Leslee Lewis. It was released on 1 October 1996 through Magnasound Records. Three songs — "Krishna", "Indian Rain" and "Sa Ni Dha Pa" — were well received.

== Track listing ==
No.	Title	Lyrics	Music	Length
1.	"It's Gonna Be Alright"	Lezz	Hari, Lezz	6:53
2.	"Indian Rain"	Lezz	Hari, Lezz	6:33
3.	"Feel Alright"	Lezz	Lezz	5:59
4.	"Krishna"	Lezz	Hari, Lezz	5:50
5.	"Let Me See The Love"	Lezz	Hari, Lezz	4:23
6.	"Sa Ni Dha Pa"	Lezz, Raajesh Johri	Hari, Lezz	5:05
7.	"Forever Yours Forever Mine"	Lezz	Lezz	5:59
8.	"Adrian's Angel"	Lezz	Hari, Lezz	4:42
9.	"Teri Meri Aankhon Mein"	Raajesh Johri	Lezz	6:02
Total length:				51:31

== Personnel ==
- Lezz - acoustic guitars
- Keith LeBlanc - drums
- Doug Wimbish - bass
- Errol Reeds - piano, keyboards
- Andy Whitmore - programming
- Vernon Reid - guitars
- Skip McDonald - guitars
- Talvin Singh - tabla, djembe
- Deepak Borkar - Indian percussion
- Madhav Pawar - Indian percussion
- Vijay Jadhav - Indian percussion
- Steve Sidwell - flugel horn
- Ramakant Patil - flute
- Liyaquat Ali - sarangi
- Vishwa Mohan Bhatt - Indian slide guitar
- Akabu - backing vocals
- Sipra Bose - Indian female vocals
- Najma Akhtar - guest Indian vocal

== Legacy ==
In 2026, Indian Prime Minister Narendra Modi gifted Australian Prime Minister Anthony Albanese a vinyl record of the album while visiting the country.
