= Aatma =

Aatma may refer to:

- Athma (film), a 1993 horror film
- Aatma (2006 film), a 2006 horror film
- Aatma - Feel It Around You, a 2013 psychological horror film
- Aatma (album), 2001, by Colonial Cousins
