= Marumugam =

2014 Indian film by Kamal

- Directed by: Kamal
- Produced by: Sanjay
- Starring: Daniel Balaji; Preethi Das; Anoop Kumar
- Cinematography: G. Kanakaraj
- Edited by: R. T. Annadurai
- Music by: Agastya; Praveen Savi (1 song)
- Production company: Entertainment Unlimited
- Distributed by: Star Studio Release
- Release date: 14 March 2014
- Running time: 160 minutes
- Country: India
- Language: Tamil

Marumugam (transl. Other side) is a 2014 Indian Tamil-language psychological thriller directed by Kamal and starring Daniel Balaji, Preethi Das, and Anoop Kumar.

== Plot ==
Mayazhagan, a clay sculptor, kills women who are attracted to him. He uses their bodies to model his clay sculptures. He falls in love with Radhika, who is in love with Ram. Mayazhagan gets engaged to Radhika. When he learns about Radhika's love affair, he decides to kill her. Whether or not Radhika escapes and reunites with Ram form the rest of the story.

== Cast ==
- Daniel Balaji as Mayazhagan
- Preethi Das as Radhika
- Anoop Kumar as Ram
- Bhanu Chander
- Uma
- Swaminathan
- Krish Raj
- Kumaresan
- Laskhmi
- Shilpi Shukla
- Kishi
- Rathna Kumar
- Isaac

== Production ==
The film is directed by Kamal, who previously wrote the story and screenplay for the Malaysian Tamil film 12 Hours. He previously worked under Aabavanan and R. Aravindraj and this film marks his directorial debut. The film began production in early 2012. The film is produced by Subramaniam's Sanjay, who works with imported furniture. The songs are scored by guitarist Agastya, who worked on several Telugu-language films. He was signed after he showed Subramaniam his songs from a Telugu film. Daniel Balaji was cast to play a serial killer. This film marks the second time he plays the lead role after Muthirai (2009). Newcomer Preethi Das was signed to portray a 12th standard student. Anoop Kumar, who played one of the leads in Chikku Bukku, was brought in to play Preethi Das's lover. His character is that of a romantic hero. Kumar did several risky stunts for his character. The film was shot in Kodaikanal, where two songs were shot, and one song was shot in the Tamil Nadu and Kerala border.

== Soundtrack ==
All the songs were composed by Agastya except for "Nee Illatha Vazhkai", which was composed by Praveen Savi. K. S. Ravikumar, Manivannan and Aabavanan attended the audio release function.

Song	Singer	Lyricist
"Kuru Kuru Kannale"	Saindhavi	Eknath
"Kattre Kadhal Kattre"	Agastya	Eknath
"Kathadi Kattukule"	Ranina Reddy	Eknath
"Boom Boom"	Belliraj, Chinmayi	Eknath
"Nee Illatha Vazhkai"	Praveen Savi, Ranina Reddy	Praveen Savi

== Release ==
The Times of India gave the film a rating of one out of five stars and wrote that " The only appreciable thing here is the title credits sequence, which captures the vibe of lurid pulp thrillers, something that the film tragically fails to realize". A critic from Maalai Malar praised Daniel Balaji's acting, the screenplay, and the cinematography.
