= V. N. Anoop Kumar =

Indian actor

- Born: Chennai, India
- Other name: Anup Tej (in Telugu)
- Occupation: Actor
- Years active: 2006–2014

V. N. Anoop Kumar is a former Indian actor who has appeared in Tamil and Telugu films. He made his debut in the 2006 film, Vattaram directed by Saran.

== Career ==
Anoop is the grandson of Telugu film director V. Madhusudhana Rao. He is originally from Vijayawada and grew up in Chennai. He learned dance at The Swingers in Chennai and also taught there. Director Saran launched Anoop in the Tamil film Vattaram, where he played a character role in love with Vasundhara Kashyap's character. Thereafter, Anoop produced a film, Kathi Kappal, in which he played the lead role. The film, which featured him alongside Meera Vasudevan, won poor reviews with a critic noting "after a point, his scruffy face makes you want to shake him out of misery". He then signed on to play a role in Keka, a Telugu film and then also appeared in a second lead role in Chikku Bukku with Arya and Shriya Saran.

In 2014, he starred in the Tamil film Marumugam co-starring Daniel Balaji, and the Telugu films Jabilli Kosam Aakashamalle and Ninnu Chusi Vennele Anukunna, the latter of which remains unreleased.

== Filmography ==
| Year | Film | Role | Language | Notes |
|---|---|---|---|---|
| 2006 | Vattaram | Ramesh | Tamil | |
| 2008 | Kathi Kappal | Joshua Prakash | Tamil | Also producer |
| 2008 | Keka | Kiran | Telugu | |
| 2010 | Chikku Bukku | Ammaiyappan | Tamil | |
| 2012 | Ishtam | Akash | Tamil | |
| 2014 | Marumugam | Ram | Tamil | |
| 2014 | Jabilli Kosam Aakashamalle | Raj | Telugu | |
