= Chikku Bukku =

- Theatrical Poster
- Directed by: G.K.Manikandan
- Written by: G.K.Manikandan; S. Ramakrishnan
- Produced by: Sunanda Murali Manohar
- Starring: Arya; Preetika; Shriya Saran
- Cinematography: R. B. Gurudev
- Edited by: V. T. Vijayan
- Music by: Colonial Cousins (songs); Pravin Mani (score)
- Production companies: Mediaone Global Entertainment; Majestic Multimedia
- Release date: 3 December 2010
- Country: India
- Language: Tamil
- Budget: ₹6.5 crore

Chikku Bhukku is a 2010 Indian Tamil romance film written and directed by G.K.Manikandan and produced by Sunanda Murali Manohar, starring Arya, debutante Preetika and Shriya Saran, in the lead roles, with Santhanam and Anoop Kumar in supporting roles. The film was released on 3 December 2010. The movie is based on the 2003 South Korean movie The Classic. The name of the film is based on the song of the same name from Gentleman (1993).

== Plot ==
The film is narrated in a nonlinear manner.

In the present, Arjun is a London-based DJ, leads a happy life. Also, there is Anu, who is pursuing her MBA in a London university. One day, Arjun is forced to come to his native village in Karaikudi to ensure that his ancestral property is not sold in an auction. Also, Anu too is forced to come to Karaikudi to meet her father, who is injured in an accident. The two strangers meet in a train. There begins their journey towards their respective destinations. Meanwhile, a diary of Arjun's father pops out from his bag. He browses through it to understand his father's love life.

In flashback, the movie goes back to 1985. It is revealed that Sekhar returns to his village after getting selected as a police officer. Sekhar falls in love with Meenal, but when their romance is revealed, Sekhar's family resists the relationship due to class differences. A dejected Sekhar leaves to begin training as a police officer. There, he becomes acquainted with Ammaiyappan, a young colleague. He learns that Ammaiyappan is in love with his uncle's daughter. A sequence of events reveals that both men love the same girl, Meenal, who in turn loves only Sekhar. After learning that Sekhar and Meenal are already in love with each other, a heartbroken Ammaiyappan attempts suicide. Feeling guilty for hiding about his love from his friend Ammaiyappan, Sekhar breaks up with Meenal and leaves his village forever leaving Meenal heartbroken.

Returning to the film's contemporary setting, we find that Arjun and Anu, after crossing several hurdles in their journey, reach their respective houses. They then realize that they have fallen for each other. Meanwhile, the film employs a Deus ex machina in the form of Anu's father Ammaiyappan to ensure that all story arcs are resolved. When Anu's father Ammaiyappan realizes that Anu is in love with Sekhar's son Arjun, he tells Anu that Arjun's father Sekhar was his old friend who had sacrificed his own life and happiness for Ammaiyappan's well-being, adding greatness to their friendship. Regretting his past mistake, Ammaiyappan immediately approves of their relationship and advises Anu to go after Arjun. On learning about Arjun's love for her, a happy Anu rushes to the airport with Ammaiyappan, succeeds in stopping Arjun and happily unites with him. It is implied that Anu and Arjun are then to stay happily together.

== Cast ==
- Arya in a dual role as Arjun Sekhar and Sekhar
- Preetika as 'Ammu' Meenal
- Shriya Saran as Anu Ammaiyappan
- Anoop Kumar as Ammaiyappan
- Santhanam as L. Vijay
- Jagan as Sekhar's friend
- Vanitha Krishnachandran as Ammu's mother
- Sukumari as Sekhar's grandmother
- Swaminathan as Vijay's father
- Manobala as Sekhar's cousin
- Vaiyapuri as Singaram
- Pandu as Sadhasivam
- T. P. Gajendran
- Singamuthu
- Halwa Vasu
- George Maryan as Porter
- T. M. Karthik as Fake Station Master
- Isaac Varghese as Police Training Officer

== Production ==
Following the success of Mediaone's previous venture, Dhaam Dhoom (2008), the production house opted to invest in another Tamil language production. They associated their interest with director Manikandan, who had worked in completing Dhaam Dhoom after the original director Jeeva had suffered a heart attack and died during the shooting in 2007. Manikandan along with Aneez Jeeva, the late director's wife, completed the film under the production of Metro Films. Chikku Bukku was announced to the general public on 10 February 2009.

With the initial announcement, the cast was revealed. Arya, who had enjoyed critical and commercial success with his role of an aghori in Naan Kadavul, was signed up for his second successive love story after completing his shoot for Sarvam. Vidya Balan was earlier being considered to play the main female lead in the film but she was unavailable due to earlier commitments. hence Preetika, the younger sister of Hindi actress Amrita Rao, was chosen in her place. Preetika who has been a model and a journalist-columnist will make her film industry debut in Chikku Bhukku. Touted to be a triangular love subject, Genelia D'Souza was considered for a third lead role in the film as well, however, a week after the announcement of the film, it was revealed that Shriya Saran had replaced Genelia in the film, due to the latter's insistence for a relatively high salary. R. B. Gurudhev was selected as cinematographer, while Hariharan and Lesle Lewis operated as the music directors for their second film, following Modhi Vilayadu.

Filming began in February 2009, with a 22-day schedule in Karaikudi being completed immediately after with Arya and Preetika. Shriya Saran began her shoot in April 2009. Other filming sites included the South Indian hill resort Ooty, London, and Tiruchirapalli International Airport.

== Soundtrack ==
The songs are composed by Colonial Cousins and Lesle while the background score is composed by Pravin Mani.

Chikku Bukku

Soundtrack album by Colonial Cousins
- Released: 13 November 2010
- Genre: Feature film soundtrack
- Label: Think Music

| No. | Song | Singers | Lyrics |
|---|---|---|---|
| 1 | "Chikku Bukku" | Benny Dayal, Maya, Rahul Nambiar, Sricharan. | Pa. Vijay |
| 2 | "Oru Nila" | Chandrayee Battacharya, Shankar Mahadevan, Uma Padmanabhan | Vaali |
| 3 | "Zara Zara" | Benny Dayal, Lavanya | Pa. Vijay |
| 4 | "Smile" | Suchith Suresan | Pa. Vijay |
| 5 | "Thooral Nindralum" | Hariharan, Wadali Brothers, Anuradha Sriram | Vaali |
| 6 | "Vizhi Oru Paadhi" | Adnan Sami, Sujatha Mohan | Vaali |
| 7 | "Adi Saarale" | Pradeep Vijay, Suvi Suresh | Pa. Vijay |

== Release and reception ==
The satellite rights of the film were secured by STAR Vijay. On 16 November 2010, the film was cleared by the Indian Censor Board.Chikku Bukku sold 2 million tickets worldwide. The release date was confirmed as 3 December 2010, following several postponements. It was released in 300 theatres worldwide. The film gained average reviews from critics, with a reviewer from Rediff stating "Chikku Bukku could have been a neat romantic tale, but the journey breaks down too much to ever hold your attention for long", concluding it as "tedious". Behindwoods offered a similar review, though stated "On the dot, if there is one perfect reason to get you intact with the show, the brilliant visuals stand out as a substantial ingredient." The Hindu stated "Chikku Bukku is a neat film that moves on parallel tracks, before the lines meet and culminate in a joyous climax. And though guessable, the narration sustains your interest. A feel-good romance!"
