= Aabshar-e-Ghazal =

Aabshaar-E-Ghazal

Studio album by Asha Bhosle, Hariharan
- Released: 1985
- Recorded: 1985
- Studio: Western Outdoor Studios
- Genre: Ghazal
- Label: CBS
- Producer: Hariharan

Asha Bhosle, Hariharan chronology
Sukoon (1983)	Aabshaar-E-Ghazal (1985)	Reflections (1987)

Aabshaar-E-Ghazal is a ghazal album by legendary Indian singers Asha Bhosle and Hariharan. It was released in the year 1985. The album featured 8 songs, all of them composed by Hariharan and sung by Asha Bhosle (including 2 duets with Hariharan). After many years, Aabshaar-e-Ghazal was re-released as Kuch Door Hamare Saath, in which all tracks were sung by Hariharan alone.

== Track listing ==
All music composed by Hariharan. Lyrics as noted.

#	Song	Singer
1	Kuch Door Hamare Saath (lyrics: Ibrahim Ashq)	Hariharan, Asha Bhosle
2	Pehle Bhi Jeete The (lyrics: Nida Fazli)	Hariharan, Asha Bhosle
3	Yahi Wafa Ka Sila Hai To (lyrics: Shakeel Badayuni)	Asha Bhosle
4	Jab Raat Ki Tanhayee (lyrics: Bashir Badr)	Asha Bhosle
5	Log Kehte Hain (lyrics: Badr)	Asha Bhosle
6	Sochte Sochte (lyrics: Naqsh Lyalpuri)	Asha Bhosle
7	Kahin Tar Kahin Shabnam (lyrics: Mumtaz Raashid)	Asha Bhosle
8	Yun Na Thi (lyrics: Saeed Rahi)	Asha Bhosle

== Reception ==
Aabshar-e-Ghazal got an overwhelming response and was a cult favorite by fans of both singers. It is perhaps Hariharan's most successful effort. It was awarded the prestigious Diva Award for The Best Album of the Year in 1994.
