= S. Ramakrishnan =

Indian writer

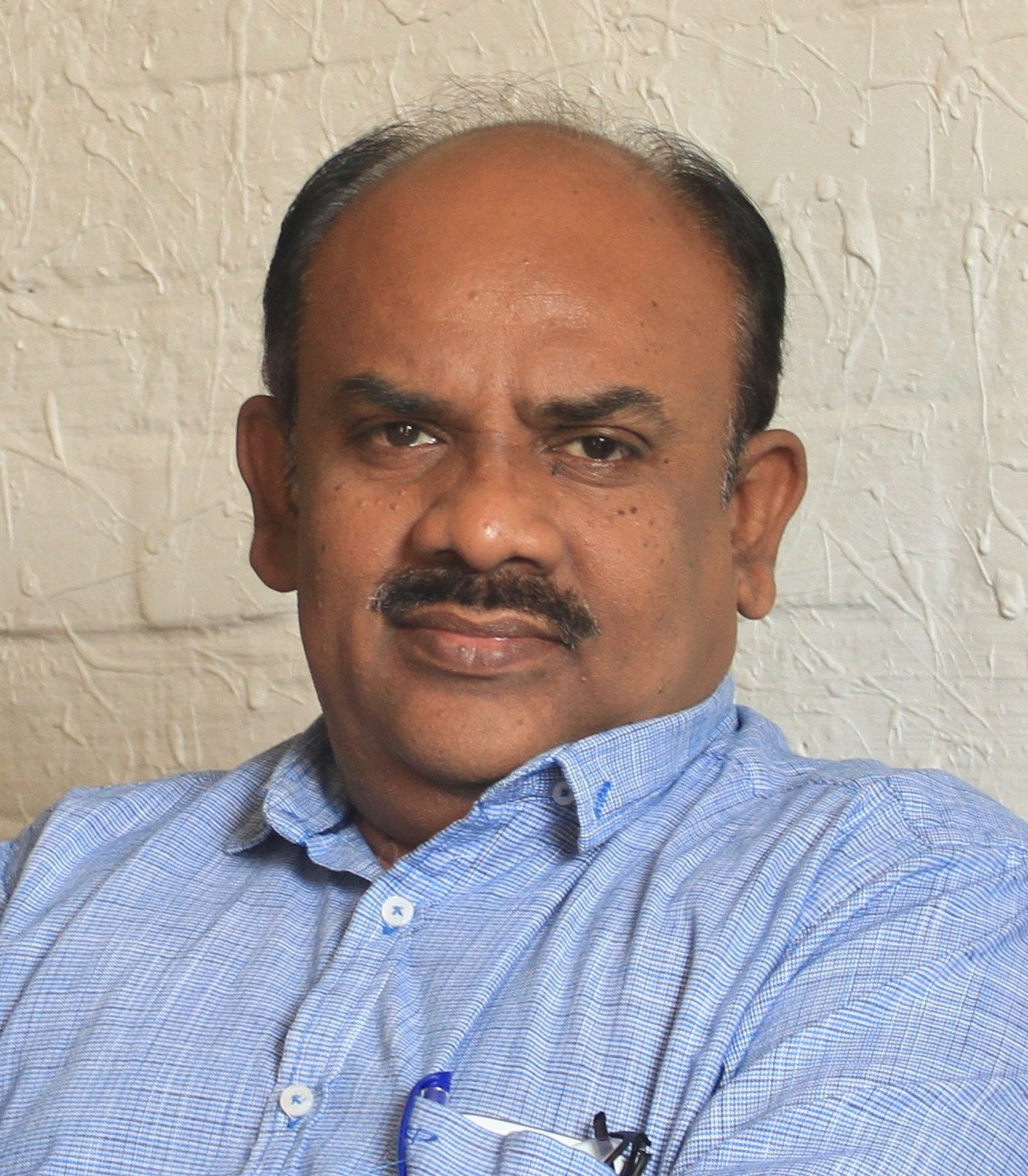
- Ramakrishnan in c. 2016
- Born: S. Ramakrishnan; 13 April 1966 (age 60); Mallankinaru, composite Ramanathapuram district, Madras State (now Virudhunagar district, Tamil Nadu), India
- Spouse: Mrs.Chandraprabha
- Children: Mr.Hari; Mr.Akash
- Parent(s): Mr.N.Shanmugam & Mrs.S.Mangayarkarasi
- Writing career
- Pen name: S.Ra
- Language: Tamil
- Genres: Short Story, Novel, Novella, Translation
- Subject: Literature
- Notable awards: Sahitya Akademi Award (2018)
- Website: Official website; Desanthiri Publication

S. Ramakrishnan is a writer from Tamil Nadu, India. He is a full-time writer who has been active over the last 27 years in areas of Tamil literature like short stories, novels, plays, children's literature and translations. He has written and published 12 novels, 22 collections of short stories, 3 plays, 24 books for children, 3 books of translation, 24 collections of articles, 19 books on world cinema, 16 books on world literature including seven of his lectures, 3 books on Indian history, 3 on painting and 4 edited volumes including a Reader on his own works. He also has 2 collections of interviews to his credit. He won the Sahitya Akademi award in 2018 in Tamil language category for his novel Sanjaaram.

== Writing career ==
About his first book he says: "I was not a writer when my first book 'veLiyil oruvan' was published. Until then I was just writing whatever I wanted to write, but I was not a writer; even after my first book came out…" and "…but now I know the direction, purpose and strength of the written word. I didn't know that then. It is like how a child with a camera takes pictures of whatever she sees… I was like that child."

His short stories and articles have been translated and published in English, Malayalam, Hindi, Bengali, Telugu, Kannada and French.

His novel Upa Paandavam, written after a deep research into Mahabharata, was selected as the best novel in Tamil. It was widely well received by the readers.

The novel Nedum Kuruthi, which spoke of the dark and tragic existential experiences of the tribe of oppressed people cruelly stamped as criminal tribe by the British, secured the Gnanavaani award for the Best Novel.

His novel Yaamam, is a historical novel that portrays the social and cultural transformations of Chennai across different periods of its history.

His Urupasi is a novel that conveys the stirring mental agonies of a young man who was unemployed because he took his degree majoring in Tamil language.

He established a wide reader base in Tamil literature through his column series, including Thunai Ezhuthu, Desandhri, Kathavilaasam, Kelvikuri and Siridhu Velicham which were published in the Tamil weekly magazine Ananda Vikatan.

== Writing style ==
His short stories are noted for their modern story-telling style in Tamil. He says in an interview: "As a storyteller, it's vital that I observe people, their mannerisms and keep myself aware of present trends…" and "…I keep myself surrounded by youngsters who I learn a lot from. I think it is such company that keeps me revitalised to write more and more stories".

He explains the magical nature of his stories quite simply – "The reason why my stories have a magical aspect is because I am unable to separate Magic from Realism."

== Literary activism ==
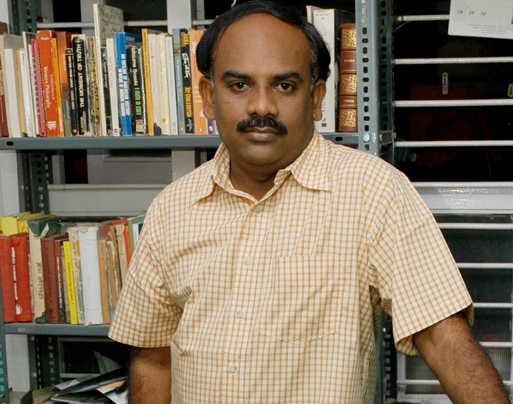
Ramakrishnan in c. 2010

He has organized over thirty story-telling camps for school children, all over Tamil Nadu. He has organized a special story-telling camp for children with dyslexia-related learning disabilities.

He says in an interview: "We have a rich tradition of PaaNans and Koothars going around places singing and creating poetry in the Sangam period. I am just a modern day PaaNan who goes to places, meets people, talks to them and tells their stories."

He had, as Editor, brought out the literary publication, Atcharam for five long years.

His website www.sramakrishnan.com serves as a resource for literature aimed at a younger audience. It has secured 5 million visits from readers all over the world.

== Publishing House 'Desanthiri' ==
In December 2017, he started his own publishing house in the name of one of his most famous books, Desanthiri. It was started to publish his own works, old ones which are not in print at present as well as his upcoming works.

== Films and other adoptions (contributions in movie and theatre performances) ==
A connoisseur of world cinema, he has compiled an introductory compendium on world cinema with thousand pages called Ulaga Cinema. He has written ten important books on cinema such as Ayal Cinema, Pather Panchali, Chithirangalin Vichithirangal and Paesa Therindha Nizhalgal. Irul Inithu Oli Inithu, Chaplinudan Pesungal.

He has organized screenplay writing camps for short film directors and students of cinema creation in important cities like Chennai, Coimbatore, etc.

His collection of 9 plays, Aravaan (Uyirmmai Publications), 3 plays, Sindhubaadhin Manaivi (Kayalkavin Publications) and Sooriyanai sutrum boomi (translated plays, Kayalkavin Publications) create new possibilities for theater space on facing power, breaking up historical and cultural images and focusing on psychological eccentricities. These plays have received good appreciation while they were staged and have been performed at the national drama festival of Sangeetha Natak Academy. The play 'Aravaan', included in this collection has been translated in to English, Malayalam and Kannada.

The short film Karna Motcham with his screenplay won the National Award for Best Short Film and went on to win, so far, 27 important awards in Indian and International Film Festivals.

Another short film Matraval has won three coveted awards as the best Tamil Short Film.

He has worked as Screenplay and Dialogue writer in Tamil feature films like Baba, Album, Chandaikkozhi, Unnale Unnale, Bhima, Dhaam Dhoom, Chikku Bukku, Modhi Vilaiyadu, Yuvan Yuvathi and Avan Ivan, Samar and Idam PoruL EvaL.

== Rewards and recognition ==
No	Award	Year	Remarks
1	Sangeetha Nataka Academy Award	1993	For Best Young playwright
2	Best Novel Award	2001	From Progressive Writers' Union
3	Gnanavaani Award	2004	For the best literary contribution
4	Best book Award	2006	From Tamil Nadu Government
5	Tagore Literary Award	2010	For Yaamam novel
6	Wisdom Young Achiever Award	2010	For the best literary contribution
7	Salem Tamil Sangam award	2010	For the best literary contribution
8	Iyal award	2011	For Lifetime achievement from the Tamil Literary Garden, Canada
9	Thisai Ettum Award	2014	Sponsored by Nalli
10	Periyar award	2014	For the best literary contribution
11	Maxim Gorky award	2015	For introduced the Russian literature
12	CKK Literary Award	2015	For the best literary contribution
13	Kannadasn Literary Award	2015	For the best literary contribution
14	Sahitya Akademi Award	2018	For the Novel Sanjaaram

Three Doctorates and 21 M.Phil. Degrees have been awarded to scholars for researching into his writings. His books have been prescribed as part of syllabi of 2 Universities and 9 Autonomous Colleges.

== Bibliography ==
=== Novels ===
No	Title	தலைப்பு	Year of publication
1	Upapaandavam	உபபாண்டவம்	2000
2	Nedungurudhi	நெடுங்குருதி	2003
3	Urupasi	உறுபசி	2005
4	Yaamam	யாமம்	2007
5	Thuyil	துயில்	2010
6	Nimitham	நிமித்தம்	2013
7	Sanjaaram	சஞ்சாரம்	2014
8	Idakkai	இடக்கை	2016
9	Padhin	பதின்	2017
10	Oru Siriya Vidumurai kala kadhal kadhai	ஒரு சிறிய விடுமுறைக்கால காதல் கதை	2019
11	Mandiyidungal thanthaiyee	மண்டியிடுங்கள் தந்தையே	2022
12	Veedu thirumbathaval	வீடு திரும்பாதவள்	2025

=== Short stories ===
No	Title	தலைப்பு	Year of Publication
1	Veliyil Oruvan	வெளியில் ஒருவன்	1990
2	Kaattin Uruvam	காற்றின் உருவம்	1993
3	Veyilai Kondu Vaarungal	வெயிலைக் கொண்டு வாருங்கள்	2001
4	Paalyanadhi	பால்ய நதி	2003
5	Nadandu Sellum Neerootru	நடந்து செல்லும் நீருற்று	2006
6	Thaavarangalin Uraiyaadal	தாவரங்களின் உரையாடல்	2007
7	Peyarillaadha Oorin Pagalvelai	பெயரில்லாத ஊரின் பகல் வேளை	2008
8	Padhinettaam Nootraandin Mazhai	பதினெட்டாம் நூற்றாண்டின் மழை	2008
9	Nagulan Veettil Yaarumillai	நகுலன் வீட்டில் யாருமில்லை	2009
10	Appodhum Kadal Paarthukondirundhadhu	அப்போதும் கடல் பார்த்துக் கொண்டிருந்தது	2010
11	Buddanaavadhu Sulabam	புத்தனாவது சுலபம்	2011
12	Mazhai Maan	மழைமான்	2012
13	Gandhiyodu Pesuven	காந்தியோடு பேசுவேன்	2013
14	KudhiraigaL Pesa Marukkinrana	குதிரைகள் பேச மறுக்கின்றன	2013
15	S.Ramakrishnan KadhaigaL Volume 1	எஸ்.ராமகிருஷ்ணன் கதைகள் - I	2014
16	S.Ramakrishnan KadhaigaL Volume 2	எஸ்.ராமகிருஷ்ணன் கதைகள்- II	2014
17	S.Ramakrishnan KadhaigaL Volume 3	எஸ்.ராமகிருஷ்ணன் கதைகள்-III	2014
18	Neerilum Nadakkalaam	நீரிலும் நடக்கலாம்	2014
19	Enna Solgirai Sudare	என்ன சொல்கிறாய் சுடரே	2015
20	Cycle Kamalathin Thangai	சைக்கிள் கமலத்தின் தங்கை	2016
21	Thanimaiyin Veettirku Nooru Jannalgal	தனிமையின் வீட்டிற்கு நூறு ஜன்னல்கள்	2017
22	Kutra Mugankal	குற்ற முகங்கள்	2025

=== Plays ===
No	Title	தலைப்பு	Year of Publication
1	Aravaan	அரவான்	2006
2	Sindhubaathin manaivi	சிந்துபாத்தின் மனைவி	2013
3	Sooriyanai chutrum bhoomi	சூரியனை சுற்றும் பூமி	2013

=== Children literature ===
No	Title	Year of Publication
1	Ezhu thalainagaram	2005
2	Kiru kiru vaanam	2006
3	Kaal MuLaitha Kathaigal	2006
4	Neela Naaku	2011
5	Pampazhaapam	2011
6	Ezhudha Therindha Puli	2011
7	Kaasu Kallan	2011
8	Thalaiyillaadha Paiyan	2011
9	Enaku Ean Kanavu Varudhu	2011
10	laali Pale	2011
11	Akkadaa	2013
12	Sirikum Vagupparai	2013
13	Vellai Raani	2014
14	Andasaraasaram	2014
15	Socrates in Sivappu Noolagam	2014
16	Karpanai Kudhirai	2014
17	Padikka Therindha Singam	2016
18	Meesaiyillaadha Apple	2016
19	Poonaiyin Manaivi	2016
20	Irakai Virikum Maram	2016
21	Ulagin Miga Chiriya ThavaLai	2016
22	Eliyin Password	2017
23	Thabalpeti Ezhithiya Kaditham	2024
24	Bommaikalin Perarasan	2025

=== Seven Lectures ===
No	Title	Year of Publication
1	Tolstoy	2013
2	Dostoyevsky	2013
3	Basho	2013
4	Shakespeare	2013
5	Hemingway	2013
6	Homer	2013
7	aayirathu oru araabia iravugaL	2013

=== Essays on World Literature ===
No	Title	Year of Publication
1	Vaakiyangalin Saalai	2002
2	Vizhithirupavanin Iravu	2005
3	Nam Kaalathu Novelhal	2008
4	Adhe Iravu Adhe Varigal	2008
5	Endraar Borges	2009
6	Chekovin Meedhu Pani Peigiradhu	2010
7	Galileo Mandiyidavillai	2011
8	Enadharumai Tolstoy	2011
9	Kafka Ezhudhaadha Kaditham	2014
10	Ulagai Vaasippom	2017
11	Novelenum Symphony	2017

=== Essays on Poetry ===
No	Title	Year of Publication
1	Koozhaangarkal Paaduginrana	2011
2	Kavignum Kavithaiyum	2023

=== Essays on Painting ===
No	Title	Year of Publication
1	Chithirangalin Visithirangal	2008
2	Picassovin Kodugal	2012
3	Aayiram Vannangal	2016
4	Nirangalai Isaiththal	2023
5	Oliyin Kaikal	2024

=== Essays on Cinema ===
No	Title	Year of Publication
1	Padher Paanjaali	2006
2	Ayal Cinema	2007
3	Ulaga Cinema	2008
4	Pesatherindha Nizhalgal	2009
5	Chaplinodu Pesungal	2011
6	Paravai Konam	2012
7	Samuraigal Kaathirukkiraargal	2013
8	Naangaavathu Cinema	2014
9	Irul Inidhu Oli inidhu	2014
10	Kutrathin Kangal	2016
11	Kaatchigalukku Appaal	2017
12	Peyarattra Natchathiram	2018
13	Innoru Parathal	2019
14	Vennira Ninaivugal	2020
15	Arupathin Nadanam	2020
16	Thirai Engum Mugangal	2021
17	Nagarangaley Saatchi	2023
18	Thotram Solatha Unmai	2023
19	Manjal Tharunangal	2025

=== Anthologies of Essays ===
No	Title	Year of Publication
1	Thunaiyezhuthu	2004
2	Kadhaavilaasam	2005
3	Desandhri	2006
4	Kelvikuri	2007
5	Ilaigalai Viyakkum Maram	2007
6	Aadhalinaal	2008
7	Kaatril Yaaro Nadakkiraargal	2008
8	Malaigal Sapthamiduvathillai	2009
9	Vaasaga Parvam	2009
10	Kurathi Mudukkin Kanavuga	2010
11	Kaan Enradhu Iyarkai	2010
12	Siridhu Velicham	2010
13	Rayileriya Graamam	2012
14	Ialkkillaadha Payani	2013
15	Pullinum Siriyadhu	2014
16	Hiroshimavil Manigal Olikkinrana	2014
17	Unavu Yuddham	2014
18	Veedilla Puthagangal	2015
19	India Vaanam	2016
20	Indrillai Eninum	2016
21	Chekov Vaazhgiraar	2016
22	Nilam Keattadhu kadal Sonnadhu	2016
23	Nilavazhi	2016
24	Ezhuthe Vaazhkkai	2017
25	Kadavulin Naakku	2017
26	Rayil Nilayagalin Tholamai	2018
27	Siriya Unmaigal	2022
28	Vaan Ketkirathu	2022
29	Novel Vasikal	2025

=== History - Non fiction ===
No	Title	Year of Publication
1	kodugal illaadha varaipadam	2008
2	enadhu India	2012
3	maraikkapatta India	2013

=== Interviews ===
No	Title	Year of Publication
1	eppodhumirukkum kadhai	2007
2	pesi kadandha thooram	2011

=== Other books - Edited volumes ===
No	Title	Year of Publication
1	Endrum Sujatha	2011
2	S.Ramakrishnan Ezhuthulagam	2011
3	Vaanengum Paravaigal	2012
4	Nooru Sirandha Sirukadhaigal	2013

=== Translation ===
No	Title	Year of Publication
1	Alice in Arpudha Ulagam	1993
2	Nambikkaiyin Parimaanangal	1994
3	Paadhaiyillaadha Payanam	2002

=== Filmography ===
Year	Title
2002	Baba
2002	Album
2003	Popcorn
2005	Sandakozhi
2007	Unnale Unnale
2008	Bheemaa
2008	Dhaam Dhoom
2009	Modhi Vilayadu
2010	Chikku Bukku
unreleased	Pesu
2011	Avan Ivan
2013	Samar
unreleased	Idam Porul Eval
2017	Sandakozhi 2
2021	Jail
2021	Enemy
2023	Ayothi

=== Short films ===
No	Title	Year of release
1	Karna Motcham	2012
2	Tharamaniyil Karapaanpoochigal	2012
3	Matraval	2014
4	Kokkarako	2014
5	Veettu Kanakku	2014
6	Pidaaran	2014
7	Vaazhkkai	2014
8	Thingal	2015
9	Oru Koppai Theneer	2015
10	Iru Kumizhigal	2015
11	Clean Bowled	2016

== See also ==
- List of Sahitya Akademi Award winners for Tamil
- List of Indian writers
- List of Tamil-language writers

== Video links ==
- Actor Rajinikanths speech at S.Ramakrishnan's felicitation function
- Vairamuthu speech at S Ramakrishnan felicitation function
- KARNAMOTCHAM-short film
- Kokkarako-short film
- Tharamaniyil Karapaanpoochigal-short film
- S.Ramakrishnan speech about Dostoyevsky
- S.Ramakrishnan speech about Hiroshima
- Ki.Ra is a True Indian Writer - S.Ramakrishnan Speech
- Karl Marx History - S.Ramakrishnan speech
