= Lahore Ke Rang Hari Ke Sang =

Studio album by Hariharan
- Released: September 26, 2005
- Recorded: 2005
- Genre: Ghazal

Hariharan chronology
Kaash (2000)	Lahore Ke Rang Hari Ke Sang (2005)	Dil Aisa Kisi Ne Mera Toda (2006)

Lahore Ke Rang Hari Ke Sang is an album of the Indian singer and Ghazal composer Hariharan, released on September 26, 2005. The album had 10 songs, all of them sung by Hariharan. This album had lot of expectations as Hariharan's last album came five years back.

== Track listing ==
Track #	Song	Singer	Composer	Lyrics	Length
1	Mohay Upnay Hi Rang Mai Rang De	Hariharan	Wazir Afzal	Amir Khusrow	5:45
2	Bhavain Tu Jaan Na Jaan	Hariharan	Wazir Afzal	Bulleh Shah	5:48
3	Dil Se Hur Guzri Baat	Hariharan	Nazar Hussain	Majeed Amjad	5:04
4	Rooth Gaye Moray Baankay	Hariharan	Qadir Shaggan	Traditional	5:36
5	Bohut Kathin Hai Dagar Punghut Ki	Hariharan	Wazir Afzal	Amir Khusrow	6:08
6	Mur Ke Hum Khak-e-Raahay Yaar Huay	Hariharan	Hariharan	Hasrat Mohani	5:36
7	Aa Vekh Asada Haal	Hariharan	Wazir Afzal	Mushtaq Soofi	6:07
8	Piya Toray Aangun Mai	Hariharan	Wazir Afzal	Tajjamul	4:46
9	Saanjh Dhalay Na	Hariharan	Hariharan	Adeen Taji	6:34
10	Begana Vaar Unsay	Hariharan	Nazar Hussain	Nasir Kazmi	6:15
