= Leslee Lewis =

Indian singer and composer (born 1960)

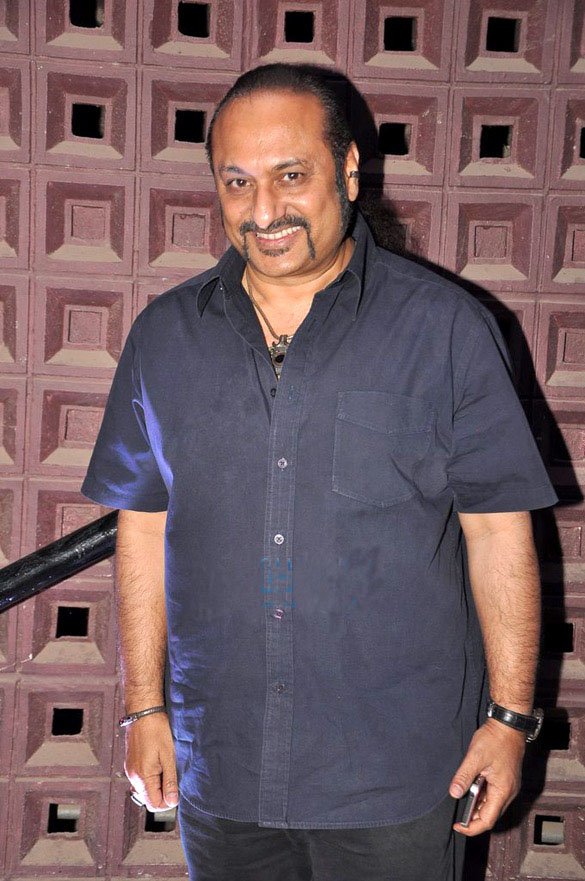

Background information
- Born: Leslee Peter Lewis; 20 June 1960 (age 66); Mumbai, India
- Genres: Indi-pop, filmi, rock
- Occupations: Singer, composer, producer
- Instruments: Guitar, bass, keys
- Years active: 1987–present

Leslee Peter Lewis (formerly spelled Leslie and Lesle; born 20 June 1960), popularly known as Lezz Lewis, is an Indian singer and composer known for his work with Hariharan as the duo Colonial Cousins. They won the MTV Asia Viewer's Choice Award and then the U.S. Billboard Viewer's Choice Award for 'Colonial Cousins', their debut album. He conceived and created all the music for Coke Studio, MTV India debut season.

Lewis is one of the first Indian composers to have introduced the Indian audiences to rock and pop music. Lewis's creative side comes as an inherited value from his father, P. L. Raj, noted choreographer from the film industry.

== Early life ==
Leslee Lewis is the son of P. L. Raj, a prolific film choreographer. He was educated at Bombay Scottish School, Mahim

As a child, Lewis was greatly influenced by The Beatles, Jimi Hendrix and Eric Clapton and with further working on his musical capabilities bagged the opportunity of recording with renowned music directors.

He played guitar at the Cafe Royal, Oberoi Towers, Mumbai and recorded with Kalyanji–Anandji, Laxmikant–Pyarelal, R. D. Burman and Louis Banks.

== Biography ==
=== Jingles ===
From 1987, he composed advertising jingles and was nominated for awards from the Indian Academy of Advertising Film Art (IAAFA). In 1989 received an award for his work. He went on to make some famous jingles such as Doodh-Doodh-Doodh (Piyo full glass), Mango Fruity fresh and juicy, Thums up taste the thunder, Santoor Santoor, etc.

=== Mainstream music ===
Lewis remixed Asha Bhosle's album Rahul and I and composed songs for Janam samjha karo, O mere sona, Piya Tu- ab toh aaja. He also composed and produced the music for Paree Hu Main by Suneeta Rao, Bombay Girl by Alisha Chinai and for KK's album Pal. He composed songs such as "Bombay Girl" and "De De- Mujh Ko" for Alisha Chinai.

He also launched Indipop boy band A Band of Boys and gave music for their hit songs such as "Meri Neendh", "Gori" and "Aa Jaa Meri Jaan".

In 1998, Lewis recorded his first solo album, Haseena. He composed the score for the Hindi films Mela and Jahd and the Tamil films Modhi Vilayadu and Chikku Bukku.

=== Colonial Cousins ===
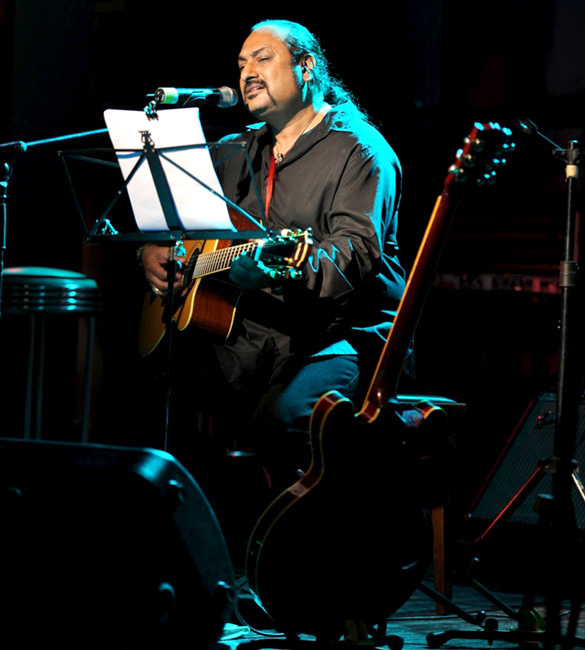
Lewis at the launch of his album 'Tanha Sa Hoon'

Lewis first worked with ghazal singer Hariharan in 1992, creating a jingle. They formed Colonial Cousins in 1996 and recorded an album, Colonial Cousins. They were the first Indian duo to be featured on MTV Unplugged. It won the MTV Indian Viewers' Choice award and Billboard Award for the Best Asian Music Group. They released the albums The Way We Do It (1998) and Aatma (2001) and composed the soundtrack for the Tamil films Modhi Vilayadu and Chikku Bukku.

== Discography ==
=== As composer ===
==== Albums ====
- Dhuan (Suneeta Rao Album) (1991)
- Bombay Girl (1994)
- Colonial Cousins (1996)
- Haseena (1998)
- The Way We Do It (1998)
- Pal (1999)
- Aatma (2001)
- Meri Neend (2002)
- Gori (2002)
- Elements (2002)
- Ye Bhi Woh Bhi (2002)
- Once More (2012)

==== Films ====
- Rockford (1999 - English)
- Mela (2000 - Hindi)
- Apna Asmaan (2007 - Hindi)
- Modhi Vilayadu (2009 - Tamil)
- Chikku Bukku (2010 - Tamil)
- Poshter Boyz (2014 - Marathi)
- Online Binline (2015 - Marathi)

=== As singer ===
Year	Film	Language	Song	Composer(s)	Writer(s)	Co-artist(s)
1999	Rockford	English	"Feels So Good"	Colonial Cousins		Hariharan
2000	Mela	Hindi	"Dekho 2000 Zamana Aa Gaya"	Leslee Lewis	Dharmesh Darshan	Hariharan, Aamir Khan
2005	Anniyan	Tamil	"Kannum Kannum Nokia"	Harris Jayaraj	Kabilan	Andrea Jeremiah, Vasundhara Das, Ranjith
2005	Aparichit	Hindi (dubbed)	"Gora Gora Aankh"	Harris Jayaraj	Mehboob Kotwal	Vasundhara Das
2006	Sainikudu	Telugu	"Byla Bylamo"	Harris Jayaraj	Chandrabose	Anushka Manchanda, Sunitha Sarathy
2008	King	Telugu	" King Title Song"	Devi Sri Prasad	Ramajogayya Sastry	Mamta Mohandas, Devi Sri Prasad
2009	Modhi Vilayadu	Tamil	"Vellaikaari"	Colonial Cousins	Vairamuthu	Hariharan
2009	Modhi Vilayadu	Tamil	"Sikki Mukki"	Colonial Cousins		Surmukhi Raman
2010	Darling	Telugu	"Hosahore"	G. V. Prakash Kumar	Ananth Sreeram	K.K.
2015	Online Binline	Marathi	"Oho Kai Zhala"	Leslee Lewis		Hariharan, Shreyash Jadhav
2019	Kaappaan	Tamil	"Hey Amigo"	Harris Jayaraj	Vairamuthu	Jonita Gandhi

== Awards and achievements ==
- 1997: MTV Asia Viewer's Choice Award for Colonial Cousins in Radio City Hall - New York
- US Billboard Viewer's Choice Award - Las Vegas
- Awarded 'Indian of the Year 2017
