= The Way We Do It =

Studio album by Colonial Cousins
- Released: November 19, 1998
- Recorded: 1998
- Genre: Indian pop
- Labels: Sony Music India, Epic Records

Colonial Cousins chronology
Colonial Cousins (1996)	The Way We Do It (1998)	Aatma (2001)

Hariharan chronology
Aathwan Sur – The Other Side of Naushad (1998)	The Way We Do It (1998)	Kaash (2000)

Lesle Lewis chronology
Haseena (1998)	The Way We Do It (1998)	Pal (1999)

The Way We Do It is the second studio album of Colonial Cousins, an Indian duo composed of singer Hariharan and singer-composer Lesle Lewis. It was released on November 19, 1998 under the label Sony Music India & Epic Records.

== Track listing ==
From iTunes.

No.	Title	Length
1.	"The Way We Do It"	3:59
2.	"Feels So Good"	4:58
3.	"Stay Back Tonight"	4:19
4.	"Funky Freedom"	6:01
5.	"Jaa Re Jaa"	3:31
6.	"Lady"	6:04
7.	"Virtual Reality"	4:28
8.	"Visions"	5:15
9.	"Dekhoon Mai Jahan"	4:36
10.	"Rhythm of The World"	4:26
11.	"No Longer Mine"	6:25
12.	"Speak Up"	4:36
