= Once More (Colonial Cousins album) =

Studio album by Colonial Cousins
- Released: October 29, 2012
- Recorded: 2012
- Genre: Pop
- Label: Universal

Colonial Cousins chronology
Aatma (2001)	Once More (2012)

Once More is the fourth studio album of Colonial Cousins, an Indian band formed by Indian duo composed of singer Hariharan and singer-composer Lesle Lewis. It was released on October 29, 2012, under the label Universal.

== Reception ==
Since the inception of Colonial Cousins in 1996, they have enjoyed massive popularity and their unique blend of traditional and contemporary music won over the hearts of audiences all over the country. The two have had three successful career albums, with their last work in 2001 with the release of 'Aatma' post which they went on to explore in their own individual careers.

To launch their latest album, the duo took to Carter Road in the suburb of Bandra, Mumbai, in a musical ensemble that worked its way from Otters Club to the amphitheater, all along performing music from their new album on top of a 40-foot canter. The event concluded with the official unveiling of album Colonial Cousins 'Once More'.

== Track listing ==
From in.com.

No.	Title	Length
1.	"Aaiyo Re"	4:49
2.	"Janaabe Ali"	3:58
3.	"Kaise Samjhayein"	4:13
4.	"Ma Ma Re - Ma Ma Re"	3:34
5.	"Radhe Govind Gopal"	6:06
6.	"Sajnave"	3:53
7.	"Tak Dhina Dhin"	4:48
