= Gulfam (album) =

Studio album by Hariharan
- Released: 1994
- Recorded: 1993
- Genre: Ghazal
- Label: Venus Stereo

Hariharan chronology
Hazir (1992)	Gulfam (1994)	Intoxicating Hariharan (1996)

Gulfam is an album of the Indian singer and Ghazal composer Hariharan, released in the year 1994 by Indian label Venus. It was composed and sung by Hariharan.

== Track listing ==
All music composed by Hariharan.

Gulfam
No.	Title	Length
1.	"Mujhe Phir Wahi"	5:23
2.	"Koi Patta Hile"	5:00
3.	"Ahede Wafa Aahista"	5:59
4.	"Daro Deewar Pe"	6:42
5.	"Who Pilaye To Zara"	6:02
6.	"Aa Chandani Bhi"	6:13
7.	"Aks Chehre Pe"	6:36
8.	"Kabhi Khushi Se"	9:16
