= Vattaram =

2006 Indian Tamil-language action gangster film by Saran

- DVD cover
- Directed by: Saran
- Written by: Saran
- Produced by: Saran
- Starring: Arya; Napoleon; Kirat Bhattal
- Cinematography: Venkatesh Anguraj
- Edited by: Suresh Urs
- Music by: Bharadwaj
- Production company: Gemini Productions
- Distributed by: Gemini Productions
- Release date: 21 October 2006
- Running time: 165 minutes
- Country: India
- Language: Tamil

Vattaram is a 2006 Indian Tamil-language action gangster film written, produced, and directed by Saran. The film stars Arya, Napoleon and Kirat Bhattal, while Ramji, Raaghav, Kadhal Dhandapani, and Avinash play supporting roles. The score and soundtrack are composed by Bharadwaj. The film was released on 21 October 2006 and was an average grosser.

== Plot ==
Burma (Arya) is the son of Thayumanavan (Nassar), who works as the personal chauffeur to Gurupadam (Napoleon), a powerful businessman secretly operating a massive illegal firearms empire in Chennai. Fascinated by Gurupadam's absolute authority, a young Burma grows up idolising the crime lord and dreams of achieving a similar status. During a childhood meeting, Burma establishes himself in Gurupadam's good graces by acting as a human shield and saving him from an assassination attempt.

This burgeoning proximity draws the jealousy of Ayravadham (Kadhal Dhandapani), Gurupadam’s ruthless right-hand man. Seeking to eliminate any future competition, Ayravadham maliciously frames Thayumanavan for theft. Unable to bear the crushing humiliation of being cast out, the chauffeur commits suicide. Distraught and orphaned, Burma is thrown into the streets of Chennai's Burma Bazaar. He hardens over the years, operating as a shrewd, underground gun dealer while meticulously planning to infiltrate Gurupadam’s syndicate and exact revenge.

Years later, Burma leverages his tactical acumen and resources to engineer a way back into Gurupadam's inner circle. By proving his efficiency, he wins the kingpin’s absolute trust and quickly rises to become his indispensable lieutenant. During this time, Gurupadam's daughter, Sangeetha (Kirat Bhattal), becomes drawn to Burma's masculine and enigmatic demeanor, eventually falling in love with him, completely oblivious to his hidden vendetta.

Burma’s rapid ascent sparks immediate hostility within the family. Ayravadham and Gurupadam’s eldest son, Veeravel (Ramji), are tooth-and-nail opposed to Burma's presence, fearing that the outsider will usurp their multi-million underworld empire. The duo orchestrates multiple machinations to kill Burma and create a rift between him and Gurupadam. However, Burma matches them with superior cunning, outmaneuvering their traps and systematically exposing their vulnerabilities from within.

To completely dismantle the syndicate, Burma plays a high-stakes game of underworld chess by subtly aligning with Karuppusamy alias A.K. Samy (Avinash), a bitter rival gang lord who was once Gurupadam's close friend turned foe. By stoking the flames of animosity between Gurupadam’s faction and Samy’s group, Burma orchestrates widespread chaos. In the ensuing power play, Burma ensures the downfall of his father Thayumanavan's wrongdoers, including Gurupadam, Veeravel and Ayravadham, where he kills Gurupadam in a fistfight with the upper hand during the climax, and the latter two by shooting them alive. Then Burma successfully claims the territory of Gurupadam as its undisputed ruler, eventually understands and reciprocates Sangeetha's pure hearted and selfless love for him since her childhood, and happily marries her, although he initially disliked her for focusing on his revenge and missions. Hence the movie concludes with a happy ending.

== Cast ==
- Arya as Burma (Vattaram)
- Napoleon as Gurupadam
- Kirat Bhattal as Sangeetha Gurupadam, Gurupadam's daughter and Burma's love interest turned wife
- Vasundhara as Veena
- Nassar as Thayumanavan
- Avinash as Karuppusamy alias A. K. Samy
- Kadhal Dhandapani as Ayravadham (Ayra)
- Ramesh Khanna as Dilli, Burma's sidekick
- Vaiyapuri as Burma's sidekick
- Ramji as Veeravel Gurupadam, Gurupadam's elder son
- Balu Anand as Inspector
- Raaghav as Vetrivel Gurupadam, Gurupadam's younger son
- Srinath as Veena's brother
- Adithya Menon as Corrupt Assistant Commissioner
- Anoop Kumar as Ramesh
- Nellai Siva
- Vijay Ganesh

== Production ==
Saran had initially cast Vasundhara Kashyap in the lead role and rechristened her with the stage name of Adhisaya, before his team convinced him to cast someone else. He also initially cast Kamna who left the film due to date issues while also considered Anushka Shetty, Amogha, Reema Sen and Deepika Padukone but finally zeroed in debutant Kirat as the lead actress after seeing her in an advertisement.

== Music ==
The soundtrack was composed by Bharadwaj with lyrics by Vairamuthu.

Title	Artist
"Naana Idhu Naana"	Kalyani
"Mudhal Mudhala"	Rajesh Krishnan & Janani Bharadwaj
"Ovvoru Pillaiyum"	Mukesh
"Idhu Kadhal Kadhal"	Rajesh Krishnan
"Unnai Partha"	Pop Shalini & Chorus
"Yaar Tharuvaar"	Bharadwaj
"Star Hotel Vendam"	Kavitha, Mrinalini & Sathyan

== Release and reception ==
Vattaram was released on 21 October 2006 on Diwali festival alongside Varalaru, Vallavan, Thalaimagan and Dharmapuri. Sify wrote, "Saran's Vattaram is an engaging action packed masaala entertainer which moves at rapid pace. Director Saran has spiffily shot and stylishly packaged the film with a milieu that is new to Kollywood – Gun running trade". Lajjavathi of Kalki wrote for people who is used of seeing gangsters with sickles, Saran has shown a different world stylishly. Cinesouth wrote, "Though a bit slow in the first half, the second half is all action and energy, making Saran's 'Vattaram' a good entertainer". Chennai Online wrote, "The backdrop is unusual for a Tamil film. The script is focused, with no silly comedy track or distracting scenes. 'Vattaram' is one of Saran's best efforts to date both as a scenarist and director. There is a lot more maturity and consistency that he reveals here than he has done in his earlier films". The film's performance at the box office was impacted by the sudden release of delayed films including Varalaru and Vallavan.
