= Aatma (album) =

Studio album by Colonial Cousins
- Released: January 1, 2001
- Recorded: 2000
- Genre: Indian pop
- Label: Sony BMG

Colonial Cousins chronology
The Way We Do It (1998)	Aatma (2001)	Once More (2012)

Aatma is the third studio album of Colonial Cousins, an Indian duo composed of singer Hariharan and singer-composer Lesle Lewis. It was released on January 1, 2001 under the label Sony BMG.

== Overview ==
Aatma was the third studio album by Indian pop band Colonial Cousins. The album was released on January 1, 2001 by Sony BMG after three years of their previous release. The album featured 9 songs, composed by Lesle Lewis and Hariharan. The music direction was done by Hariharan, Leslie Lewis, Jaidev & Ustad Ghulam Mustafa Khan. The songs were written by Munawar Masoom, Leslie Lewis, Milind Joshi, Thyagaraja, Tahir Faraz, Dev Kohli and Traditional by Ustad Ghulam Mustafa Khan and Ibrahim Ashq.

The vocals are provided by Hariharan and Lesle Lewis. The English portions are sung by Lewis, who is a singer of pop music, and the Hindi portions are sung by Hariharan, who is an exponent of various genres of Indian and Pakistani music including Hindustani, Carnatic and ghazal music.

Hariharan's child was the inspiration for I Love You Girl.

== Track listing ==
Aatma
No.	Title	Length
1.	"Guiding Star"	5:35
2.	"Mata Pita"	3:20
3.	"Dheem Dheem Dhirena"	3:40
4.	"Dil Mein Tu"	6:33
5.	"I Love You Girl"	5:14
6.	"Sri Rama"	6:35
7.	"Kai Zhala"	4:25
8.	"Turn Around Angel Eyes"	6:05
9.	"Sundar Balma"	6:12
