= Halka Nasha =

Studio album by Hariharan
- Released: September 1996
- Recorded: 1996
- Genre: Ghazal
- Length: 42:53
- Label: Bayshore

Hariharan chronology
Jashn (1996)	Halka Nasha (1996)	Colonial Cousins (1996)

Halka Nasha is a popular Hindi ghazal album of the Indian singer and Ghazal composer Hariharan. It was released on 1996 by Bayshore, and later re-released by the same label in 2004 for its popularity. The album consists of 8 songs composed by Utpal Biswas and sung by Hariharan. Hariharan's 3-year-old son Karan Hariharan faced the camera with him for popular track ‘Halka Nasha’ along with Dr Tinku Bali. The album was also simultaneously released in Punjabi of the same name and in Tamil of Kadhal Vedham.

== Track listing ==
All music composed by Utpal Biswas

Halka Nasha
No.	Title	Length
1.	"Tera Naya Naam"	5:22
2.	"Halka Sa Ek Nasha"	5:10
3.	"Aankhon Se Baatein Kare"	6:02
4.	"Duniya Parayi Hui"	4:22
5.	"Kaise Jiyoon Main"	3:47
6.	"Jawaan Mausam"	5:06
7.	"Duniya Bhar Ki"	7:07
8.	"Hum Tera Intezaar"	5:54

== Album credits ==
- Utpal Biswas - composer
- Hariharan - singer

Recorded, Mixed and Mastered- Shantanu Mukherjee Arranged by-Bhavdeep Jaipurwale
