= Vasundhara Kashyap =

Indian actress and model

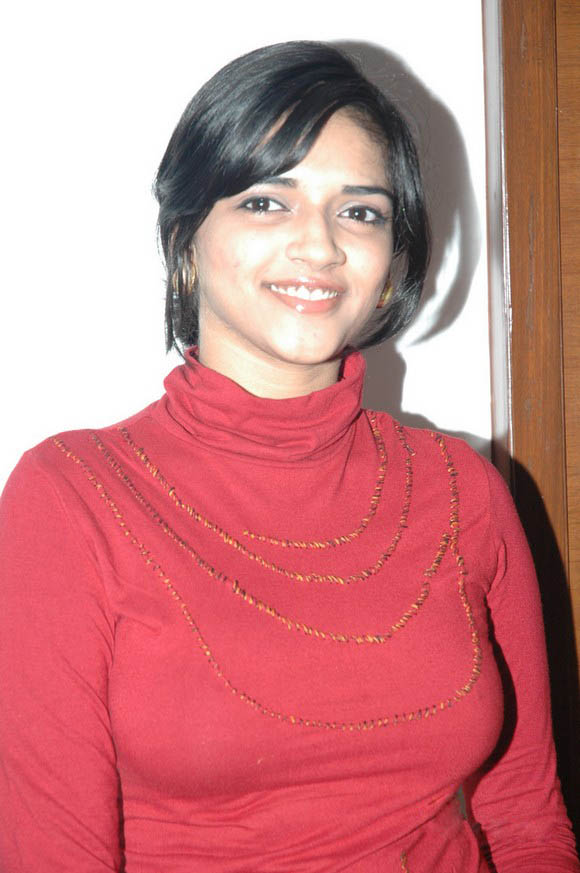
- Vasundhara Kashyap at the Thenmerku Paruvakaatru press meet.
- Born: Vasundhara; New Delhi, India
- Other names: Adhisaya; Vasundhra Chiyertra
- Occupations: Actress; author; model
- Years active: 2006–present

Vasundhara Kashyap is an Indian actress, author and model in Tamil language films.

== Career ==
Vasundhara was born to a Tamil father and a Maharashtrian mother. She first appeared in the 2006 Tamil film Vattaram and later starred in films including Kaalaipani, Jeyamkondaan and Peraanmai. She took part in the Miss Chennai contest and was crowned Miss Creativity, following which she took up modelling. She changed her name to Vasundhara Kashyap while filming Thenmerku Paruvakaartru.

She turned author with The Accused, a murder mystery, published by Westland in 2025.

== Filmography ==
- All films are in Tamil, unless otherwise noted.

List of Vasundhara Kashyap film credits
| Year | Film | Role | Notes |
|---|---|---|---|
| 2006 | Vattaram | Veena | Credited as Adhisaya |
| 2007 | Unnale Unnale | Jhansi's friend | Credited as Adhisaya |
| 2008 | Kaalaipani | Samvedhna | Credited as Adhisaya |
| 2008 | Jayamkondaan | Poongodhai | |
| 2009 | Peraanmai | Kalpana | |
| 2010 | Thenmerku Paruvakaatru | Pechi | |
| 2011 | Poraali | Maari | |
| 2012 | Tuneega Tuneega | Neetu | Telugu film |
| 2013 | Sonna Puriyathu | Anjali | |
| 2014 | Chithirayil Nilachoru | Gauri | |
| 2019 | Kanne Kalaimaane | Muthulakshmi | |
| 2019 | Bakrid | Geetha | |
| 2023 | Thalaikkoothal | Kalaiselvi | |
| 2023 | Kannai Nambathey | Vasundhara "Vasu" | |
| 2024 | Kanguva | Aeral | |
| 2026 | Angikaaram | | |

=== Television ===
List of Vasundhara Kashyap television credits
| Year | Film | Role | Network | Ref. |
|---|---|---|---|---|
| 2023 | Modern Love Chennai | Vaijayanti | Amazon Prime Video | |
| 2026 | Exam | Saranya | Amazon Prime Video | |
