= Gulfam (writer) =

- ગુલ્ફામ
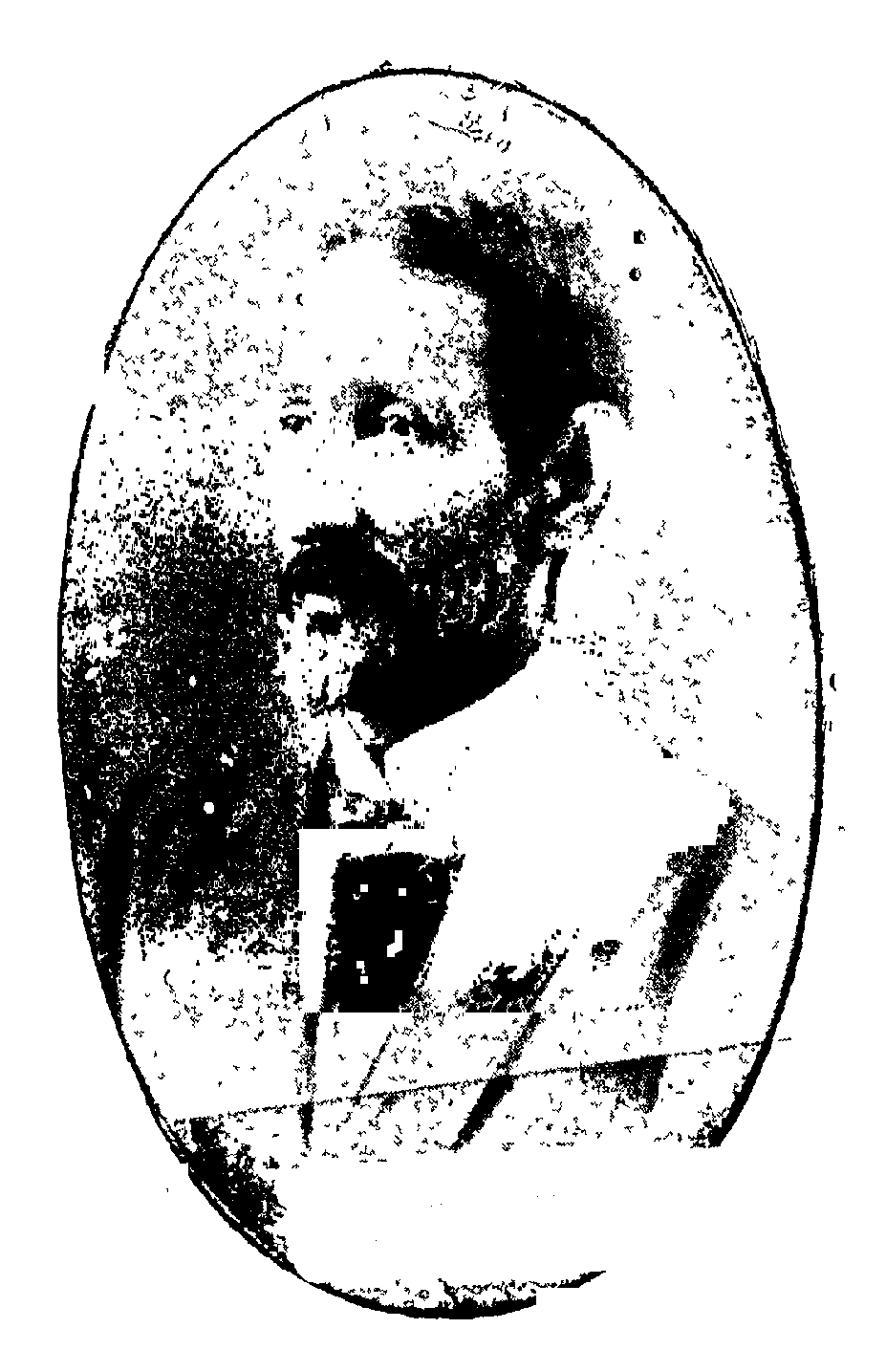
- Born: Jahangir Nasharvanji Patel; 14 July 1861; Bombay, British India
- Died: 24 August 1936 (aged 75)
- Occupations: Humour writer, journalist
- Writing career
- Pen name: Gulfam
- Language: Gujarati

Signature
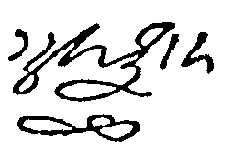

Gulfam, born Jahangir Nasharvanji Patel alias Pestonji, was a Gujarati humour writer and journalist from Bombay, India.

== Life ==
Gulfam was born on 14 July 1861 in Parsi Patel family living in a large and one of the oldest houses in Fort area of Bombay which was used as a court and jail during Portuguese rule in city. His father was a translator. He started writing at the age of nine and published his first book Sonarna Gadh at the age of 13. He started writing in spreads then. As he believed that his host would not like it, he published in spreads under name of his sister. His first writing was published in Gul-afshan spreadsheet. He received a nickname Gulfam as he played a role of it in a play in his school. Initially he did not like it but he later proudly accepted it. At the age 16, his ghazal was published in Gyanvardhak magazine. At the age of 53, in 1931, he had written his autobiography Mari Potani Jindagino Hewal and wished it to be published posthumously which was later published by Jahangir B. Karani & Sons. He died on 24 August 1936.

== Works ==
Gulfam had written large number of works under several pen names. It is not known how many of his works survived. His writing used to publish in several magazines and newspapers like Kaiser-e-Hind, Fursad, Gyanvardhak, Laxmi, Akhbar-e-Sodagar, Gapsap, Jam-e-Jamshed and Bombay Samachar. His first book was Sonarna Gadh. He had written large number of humorous sketches which were so popular that they were often plagiarised by other publishers.

In 1909, Firozshah Jahangir Marzban, the founder of Jam-e-Jamshed, had written in introduction of his book Khen Kotak, "The writer of nearly 50 stories, several original anecdotes and original plays, column writer in half-dozen newspapers and quarter-less-in-dozen magazines, specialist of jokes and sketches, person who swam across an ocean of poetry and short stories, favourite of goddess of writing; Jahangir Patel".

Khen Kotak is filled with solid wit in its more than 200 pages. Guldaste Ramuj is 325 pages filled with jokes. He had translated a thousand year old Arabic work on dream interpretation as Swapnani Tasir. Sugandhma Sado and Mote Gharna Bai Saheb are suspense stories based on Parsi householder life. English writer H. Rider Haggard had written two popular novels; She: A History of Adventure and Ayesha which were translated by him as Mashukno Ijaro. Pratapi Laxmi Prasad was a historical story set before arrival of British in India. Naval Nanavati was a humorous story of a dumb Parsi boy, a duff lady, a gullible villager and honest Zoroastrian lady. It was considered as the most humorous story of all his work by himself.

He has published 52 story-plays and if his plays and dramas for drama clubs and amateur clubs are considered then it rises to 63. He has written more than 60 short stories. His sketches and jokes are counted in thousands. He had written one-act plays.

He had written a book on European etiquette, Bhulsho Na – Aa Adab Ada (Etiquette) Mateni Suchnao which was published posthumously in 1937. It included his short biography.

== Criticism ==
Amrit Keshav Nayak, a prolific stage actor had said, "I love whatever Jahangir writes as he is first born actor and second born writer among Parsis."
