= Modhi Vilayadu =

- Theatrical release poster
- Directed by: Saran
- Written by: S. Ramakrishnan; Saran
- Produced by: Murali Manohar
- Starring: Vinay; Kajal Aggarwal; Santhanam
- Cinematography: A. D. Karun
- Edited by: V. T. Vijayan
- Music by: Colonial Cousins
- Distributed by: Mediaone Global Entertainment Ltd. Gemini Industries & Imaging Private Ltd.
- Release date: 24 July 2009
- Country: India
- Language: Tamil

Modhi Vilayadu (transl. Play by clashing) is a 2009 Indian Tamil-language romantic action film directed by Saran and produced by Murali Manohar. It stars Vinay, Kajal Aggarwal and Santhanam, while Kalabhavan Mani, Cochin Haneefa, Yuva and others play supporting roles. The music was composed by Colonial Cousins with cinematography by A. D. Karun and editing by V. T. Vijayan. The film was released on 24 July 2009.

== Plot ==
Rajan Vasudev is an intolerable business tycoon who runs the great OPM Group of companies spread across the globe. He meaninglessly topples companies by either buying or taking the majority shares so that his company can spread across the globe. His wife was killed 20 years ago by a rival mafia, which turned him this way. Udhay Vasudev is his only son, a spoilt kid who drives a Ferrari, spends lakhs of rupees everyday, and lives in one of the most sophisticated houses in Chennai. He is the sponsor for his constant companion Madhan, who lives with him and local friend Kadukku along with 12 bodyguards. Udhay meets Easwari, a music student in Chennai in an accident, and falls head on for her. He wants to get close to her and blackmails her by saying that she has damaged his car and could work for him to compensate the 10 lakh she owes him in damages, and in a funny turn of events, he makes her his domestic help. Soon, Madhan falls in love with Easwari, who has fallen for Udhay.

An assassin is hired by Rajan's rival, whose son-in-law commits suicide due to Rajan's pressure, to knock off Udhay, the only heir to the business empire. But in a bizarre twist, the hitman accidentally kills Madhan, and Rajan is heartbroken as it is revealed that Madhan is his real son whereas Udhay was just a proxy for Madhan. Udhay, who does not know this, now spends a lot money. Suddenly, he is thrown out of his house, and his bank account is wiped clean by OPM. Multiple assassination attempts are made on him, and he meets Rajan in rags.

Rajan reveals the truth to him and challenges him to live for 3 days as he will not reveal the truth to anyone else. Udhay ends up on the streets overnight as he is not needed any longer. He then goes to Mumbai to meet Easwari, who turns out to be the daughter of the chairman of the very rich Lakshmiraman. Though Easwari has enough shares to become the next chairwoman, her stepmother's relatives refuse her because both of her parents are not Hindi-speaking by birth. Easwari denounces her claim and heads back to Chennai with a shocked Udhay. Udhay then decides to teach his father a lesson. He convinces all of his father's daily staff to act as if they had forgotten him for two days. As a result, Rajan is refused entry into his own office where none of his staff recognises him and his personal belongings are stolen. He is down to rags and has to sleep on the streets. The next day, he tries to complain to the police, but sees another person's face with his name under his company's posters. He is then arrested by the police under false accusation but is released the next day. He is recognised by everyone and returns to his office.

In his absence, Udhay has assumed office as acting chairman and has called for general body meeting the next day to officially confirm him as the next chairman. Udhay blackmails Rajan that if he reveals the truth about his son to the public, Udhay will immediately resign from office and get out of Rajan's sight. Rajan seemingly agrees. An assassin is sent to kill Udhay, as his business rivals still believe that he is Rajan's son. Rajan deceives Udhay, claims he is his son, and says he is proud of him. The assassin attempts to shoot Udhay, but shoots Rajan. Udhay chases the killer and gets him apprehended.

Udhay, who is down to tears as the world will never know the truth, is surprised to see a video of dying Rajan telling the truth to public in a video. Udhay, with the help of Chanakya, establishes a charitable trust under the name of his deceased companion Madhan and continues with his love.

== Cast ==
- Vinay as Udhay Vasudev
- Kajal Aggarwal as Easwari Lakshmiram
- Santhanam as Kadukku
- Kalabhavan Mani as Rajan Vasudev
- Cochin Haneefa as Chanakya
- Yuva as Madhan
- Amit Dhawan as Iqbal
- Alse Ram as Alse
- Raviprakash as Lakshmiram
- Mayilsamy as T. M. Sekhar
- Mahadevan as Madhan's uncle
- Sathnam Singh

Deva, Hariharan, and Lesle Lewis appear in the promotional video of the song "Modhi Vilayadu".

== Soundtrack ==
The music is composed by the Colonial Cousins duo (consisting of Hariharan and Leslee Lewis) in their Tamil debut. The audio launch was held on 28 April 2009.

Song title	Singers	Length
"Modhi Vilayaadu"	Deva, Hariharan	4:37
"Latcham Varthaigal"	Ranjani	3:08
"Ottrai Vaarthayil"	Shaan	3:26
"Vellaikaari"	Hariharan, Lesle Lewis, Achu	3:44
"Chikki Mukki"	Surmukhi Raman, Lesle Lewis	4:28
"Paathi Kadhal"	Sunitha Sarathy, Bombay Jayashree	3:44

== Critical reception ==
Pavithra Srinivasan of Rediff.com wrote, "If only Saran had backed up the lavish sets, costumes, songs and dialogues with a story free of loop-holes". The New Indian Express wrote, "In Modhi Vilayadu, a glossy and stylish film, Saran has tried hard to regain his touch but the end result is no different from his earlier films".
