= Colonial Cousins =

Indian musical duo

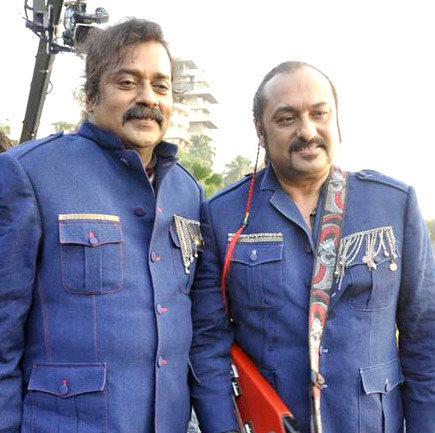
- Hariharan and Leslee Lewis at the launch of their album Once More (2012)

Background information
- Origin: Mumbai, India
- Genres: Indian fusion, Pop, rock, soundtrack
- Years active: 1992–present
- Labels: Magnasound; Sony Music; Universal
- Members: Hariharan; Leslee Lewis

Colonial Cousins is an Indian duo, formed by singer Hariharan (Hari) and singer-composer Leslee Lewis (Lezz), who also have successful solo careers. Their eponymous first album hit platinum in sales in India and consistently headed the Indian music charts in 1996. The duo have received numerous awards, notably the MTV Asia Viewers' Choice Award, 1996, and the US Billboard's Viewers' Award, 1996. On 19 November 1998, the Colonial Cousins released their second album, The Way We Do It. They released their third album Aatma on 1 January 2001. They have scored two Tamil films, Modhi Vilayadu (2009), Chikku Bukku (2010). Their fourth album Once More was released in 2012.

== History ==
=== Formation ===
It was during Lezz's career of writing jingles that the idea of Colonial Cousins came out. Lezz had called in Hari to sing a jingle for him one evening in 1992. The lyrics for the jingle were late coming in, so the restless Lezz began crooning something while strumming on his guitar. Hari felt inspired to jam with as in classical music.

Being a ghazal singer in the Indian music industry for over two decades, Hari is well versed in Carnatic and Hindustani music. Besides releasing several ghazal albums, Hari has also lent his voice to many Hindi and Tamil films, and ended up winning several awards including the National Award as Best Singer for his song "Mere Dushman Mere Bhai" from the film Border.

=== Albums ===
==== Debut album ====
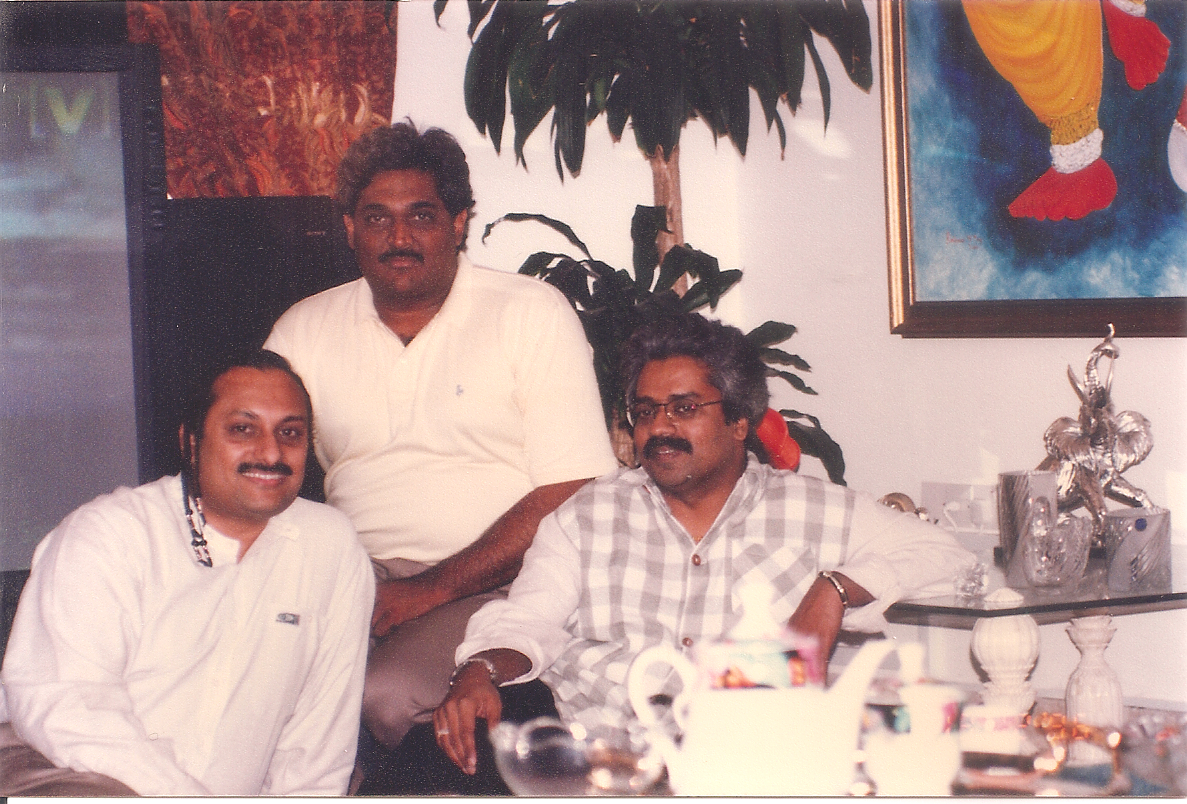
L-R: Lezz, Shashi Gopal, Hari

In October 1996, under Magnasound Label, the duo released their debut album self-titled Colonial Cousins. The album broke all records including hitting platinum sales in India. The duo also won the MTV Asia Viewer's Choice Award and then later on collected the US Billboard Viewer's Choice Award too. The song "Krishna" won the Star Videocon Award for Best Music Video.

The style is essentially fusion, with a lot of songs opening with recognisable Hindustani or Carnatic ragas and then segueing into a more pop style. The musicians who worked on it range from Vishwa Mohan Bhatt to sessions musicians who have worked with the likes of Madonna, Boy George, Annie Lennox, Vernon Reid, and other well-known Western musicians. It was the first Indian act to be featured on MTV Unplugged.

==== The Way We Do It ====
On 19 November 1998, their second album, a sophomore effort, The Way We Do It, was a continuation of, and a departure from, that first effort.

The album was a continuation in musical terms to the extent that Hari and Lezz had done what they do best individually, and fused it into a format that enriches and complements each other. The album was also a departure sound-wise from their eponymous first album. While that has a softer sound to it, their second album was edgier and groovier.

==== Aatma ====
After two-and-a-half years in hibernation, Colonial Cousins, recorded their third album Aatma. Released in April 2001, on the Sony Music label, the nine-track album was a fusion of Indian vocals and contemporary instrumentation. Besides being busy in playback singing Hariharan had cut a ghazal album Kaash the previous year, while Lezz had been busy composing jingles and producing music.

There is also a song "I Love You Girl" which Lezz has dedicated to his daughter Divya.

==== Once More ====
In 2012, 11 years after their previous album, the duo came together to release their brand new album Once More. To launch their latest album, the duo took to the jostling promenade of Carter Road in the busy suburb of Bandra, Mumbai, in a musical ensemble that worked its way from Otters Club to the amphitheater, all along performing music from their new album on top of a 40-foot canter. The event concluded with the official unveiling of the album Once More.

=== Films ===
==== Modhi Vilayadu ====
In 2009, the Colonial Cousins made a debut as music composers for Tamil film Modhi Vilayadu directed by Saran. The director of the film required a new trend of music and therefore brought in the Indipop duo, thus opening doors for them to the Tamil Film Industry.

==== Chikku Bukku ====
Colonial Cousins scored their second soundtrack for the film Chikku Bukku (2010). Its audio was released on 13 August.

== Discography ==
Albums

- Colonial Cousins (1996)
- The Way We Do It (1998)
- Aatma (2001)
- Once More (2012)
- Rediscovered Gems (2015)

Films

- Modhi Vilayadu (2009)
- Chikku Bukku (2010)

== Awards and achievements ==
- 1997: MTV Asia Viewer's Choice Award for Colonial Cousins
- US Billboard Viewer's Choice Award
