= Hariharan (singer) =

Indian playback singer (born 1955)

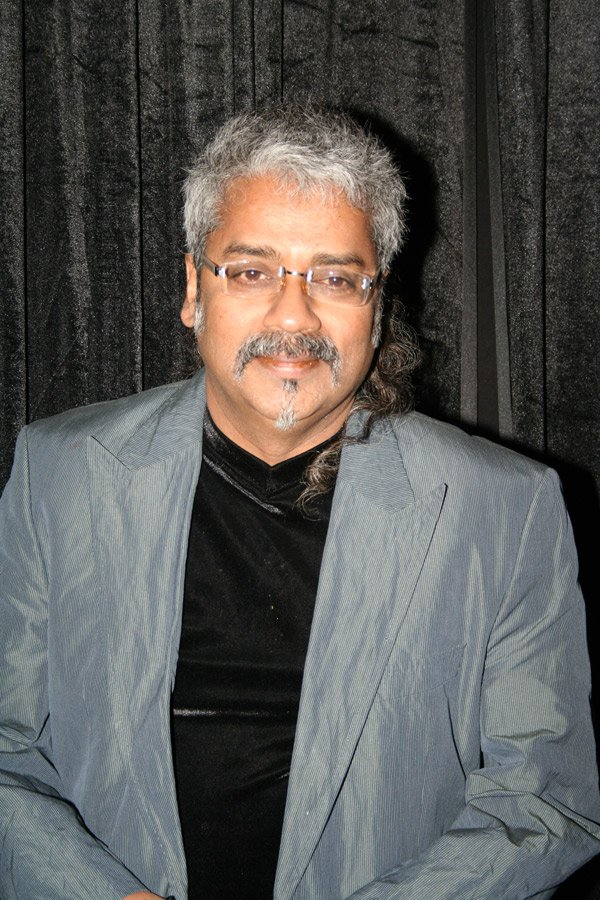
- Hariharan in February 2014
- Born: Ananthasubramani Hariharan; 3 April 1955 (age 71); Mumbai, Maharashtra, India
- Occupation: Playback singer
- Years active: 1977–present
- Honours: Padma Shri (2004); Kalaimamani (2005)
- Musical career
- Genres: Indian classical music; Indian devotional songs; Playback singing; Filmi; Ghazal
- Instruments: Vocals, harmonium

Ananthasubramani Hariharan (born 3 April 1955) is an Indian playback, bhajan and ghazal singer who predominantly sings in Hindi, Tamil, Malayalam, Kannada and Telugu languages. He has also sung over 15,000 notable songs in 10+ languages including Marathi, Sinhala, Maithili, Bhojpuri, Odia, Bengali, Sanskrit, Gujarati and English. He is an established ghazal singer and one of the pioneers of Indian fusion music. Hariharan is widely regarded as one of the greatest playback singers in Indian cinema.

In 2004, he was honoured with the Padma Shri by the Government of India and is a two-time National Award winner. Hariharan, associating with Lesle Lewis, formed the duo Colonial Cousins. They have cut many private music albums and also scored music for a few feature films in Tamil and Hindi. In 1992, Hariharan and late Gulshan Kumar's Hanuman Chalisa recorded under the label of T-Series crossed the 5.7 billion + views mark on YouTube, making it the first devotional song in the world to do so.

== Early life and education ==
Hariharan was born in Mumbai, Maharashtra, on 3 April 1955, into a Tamil Brahmin family, to classical musicians H. A. S. Mani and Alamelu Mani. His father, H. A. S. Mani, affectionately called Chellamani, groomed many Carnatic singers in Mumbai, where he died in his early 40s due to cardiac arrest in 1963. His mother Alamelu Mani (born 1935) has had a long career as Carnatic vocalist and a distinguished teacher and was honoured with the title Sangeeta Pracharya in 2019.

Hariharan did his schooling at Don Bosco High School, Matunga. He then graduated from SIES College of Arts, Science & Commerce, Mumbai. Thereafter he pursued his studies at the St. Xavier's College, Mumbai.

== Career ==
=== Film career ===
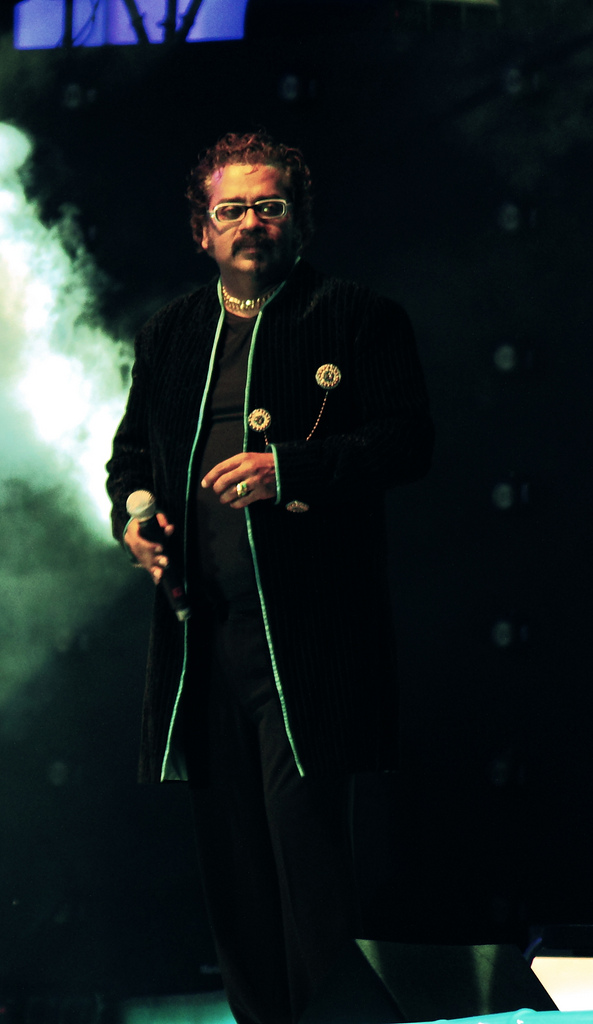
Hariharan performing at A R Rahman's concert, Sydney (2010)

At the start of his career, Hariharan did the concert circuit and also performed on TV. He sang for many TV serials (e.g., Junoon). His debut song "Ajeeb Sa Neha Mujh Par Guzar Gaya Yaaron" won him an Uttar Pradesh State Film Award and a National Award nomination.

Hariharan entered the world of Tamil films in 1992, introduced by debutant music director A. R. Rahman with the patriotic song "Thamizha Thamizha" in Maniratnam's film Roja. He was judged best male playback singer in the 1995 Tamil Nadu State Government Film Awards for his soulful rendition of the song "Uyire Uyire" also by music director A. R. Rahman in Maniratnam's Bombay (Hariharan sang the song with K. S. Chithra). Hariharan has been one of the most trusted singers of Rahman and has sung many songs for him in long list of movies that includes Muthu, Minsara Kanavu, Jeans, Indian, Mudhalvan, Taal, Rangeela, Indira, Iruvar, Anbe Aaruyire, Kangalal Kaithu Sei, Sivaji, Alai Payuthey, Kannathil Muthamittal, Guru, Enthiran etc. He composed music for the Indo-Polish FilmNo Means No. In 1998, Hariharan won the National Award for the soulful rendition of the song "Mere Dushman Mere Bhai" from the Hindi movie Border, composed by Anu Malik. Hariharan got another National Award for the Marathi song "Jiv Rangla" from Jogwa.

He has sung more than 500 Tamil songs and nearly 200 Hindi songs. He has also sung hundreds of songs in Malayalam, Telugu, Kannada, Marathi, Bengali and Odia languages. Hariharan has acted in a Tamil film with Khushbu, Power of Women (2005), and played cameo roles in the Tamil film Boys and the Malayalam film Millennium Stars.

=== Ghazals ===
Hariharan is one of the foremost Indian ghazal singers and composers with more than thirty albums to his credit. In his early career, he cut several successful ghazal albums, writing most of the scores himself. One of Hariharan's first ghazal albums was Aabshar-e-Ghazal with Asha Bhosle, which went gold in sales.

Another outstanding ghazal album was Gulfam, which not only hit double platinum in sales but also fetched Hariharan the Diva Award for the Best Album of the Year in 1995.

The other ghazal albums from him Hazir (1992), Jashn (1996), Halka Nasha (1996), Paigham (1997), Kaash (2000), and Lahore Ke Rang Hari Ke Sang (2005). His live concert recordings, Hariharan in Concert (1990), Saptarishi (1996) and Swar Utsav (2001). His latest ghazal album is Lafzz... (2008).

The album Lahore Ke Rang Hari Ke Sang won rave reviews and critical acclaim inside and outside India. A. R. Rahman was an avid listener of his ghazals way before roping him in to sing his first song in Tamil film music, "Thamizha Thamizha", for the film Roja.

=== Colonial Cousins ===
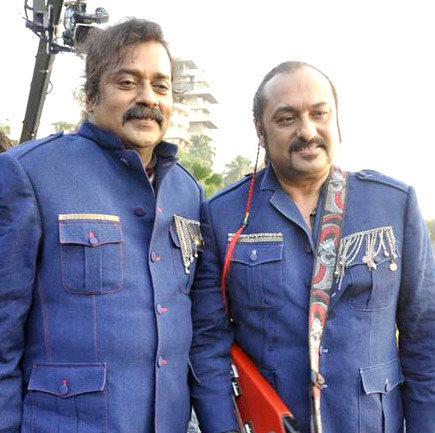
Hariharan (left) and Leslie Lewis at the launch of "Once More", 2012

The year 1996 was a career milestone; he formed the band Colonial Cousins with Mumbai-based composer and singer Lesle Lewis. Their first album, Colonial Cousins was a fusion album and was the first Indian act to be featured on MTV Unplugged. It won a string of awards including the MTV Indian Viewers' Choice award and Billboard Award for the Best Asian Music Group.

The next albums by this band were The Way We Do It (1998) and Aatma (2001). Colonial Cousins released their fourth studio album "Once More" on 29 October 2012 under the label Universal. The 2009 Tamil film Modhi Vilayadu had score and soundtrack composed by Colonial Cousins. They also scored the 2010 Tamil film Chikku Bukku.

=== Recent years ===
In 2004, he was awarded the Padma Shri and Yesudas Award for his outstanding performance in music.

Hariharan collaborated with Pakistan based band Strings for a track called "Bolo Bolo". He released an album called Destiny with Punjabi/bhangra artist Daler Mehndi.

He coined the terminology "Urdu Blues" with his fairly successful album Kaash which featured musicians like Anandan Sivamani the percussion maestro, Ustad Rashid Mustafa on tabla, Ustad Rais Khan on sitar and Ustad Sultan Khan on sarangi.

He also performed the Swagatham song in the 2010 Commonwealth Games opening ceremony held in New Delhi on 3 October.

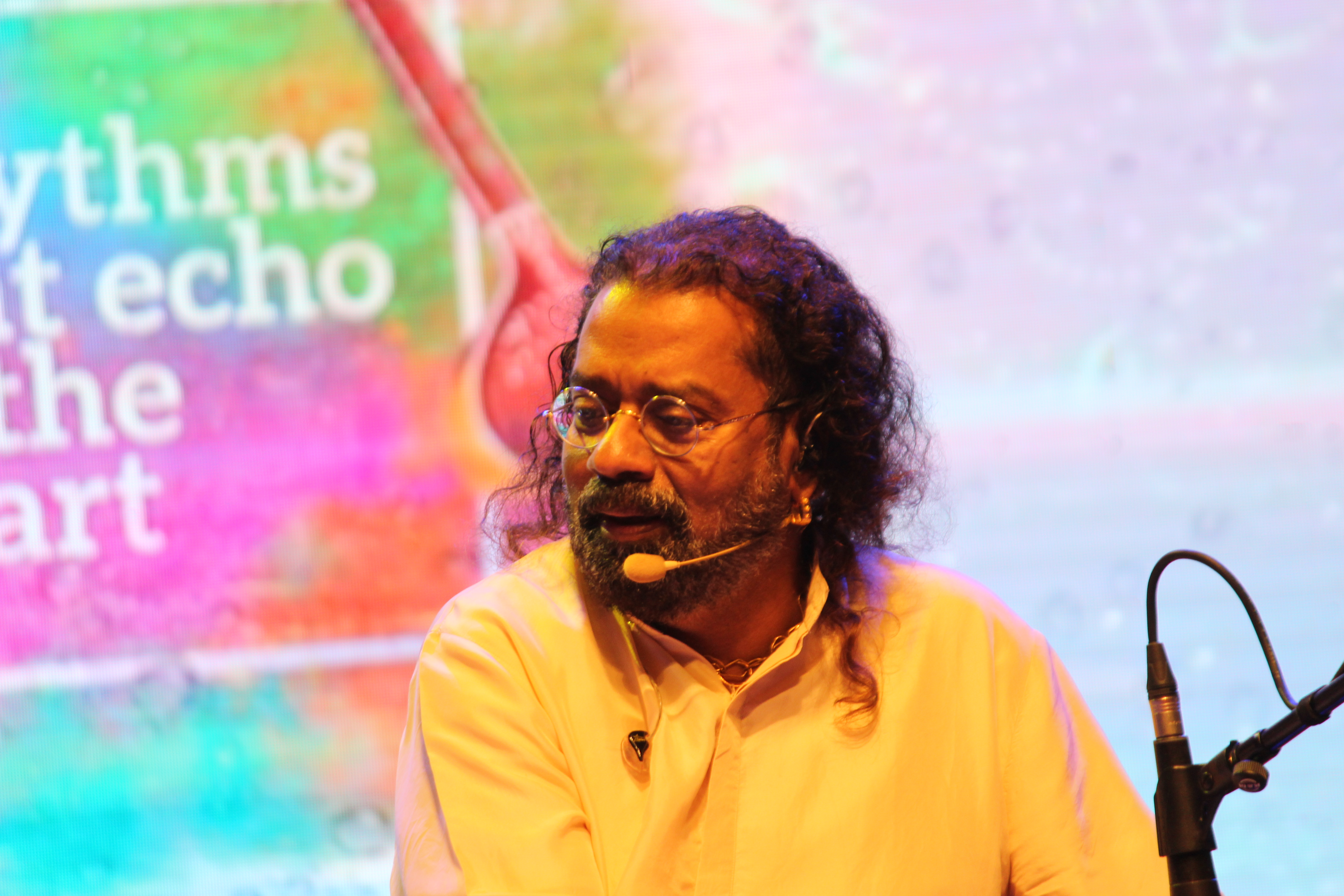
Hariharan at a concert in Thiruvananthapuram, 2018

During 2010–2011, he appeared in a music show on Jaya TV named Hariyudan Naan which was aired every Thursday, Friday and Saturday.

Hariharan collaborated with Sarangan Sriranganathan for "Sruthi" at the Sydney Hill Centre and the Melbourne Robert Blackwood Hall, Australia, in 2011. He unofficially released ghazal singer Adithya Srinivasan's first international single 'Gham e Duniya' at the Gateway Hotel, Bangalore. In an interview in 2012, he said that he was no longer receiving offers to sing for Bollywood as music composers wanted to experiment with singers from the younger generation. He was selected as a judge for the Asianet Star Singer Season 6 programme, a very popular music contest television show for upcoming singers in Malayalam. Hariharan was a part of the 'Royal Stag Barrel Select MTV Unplugged', aired in December 2015.

== Major awards ==
Civilian Awards

- 2004 – Padma Shri

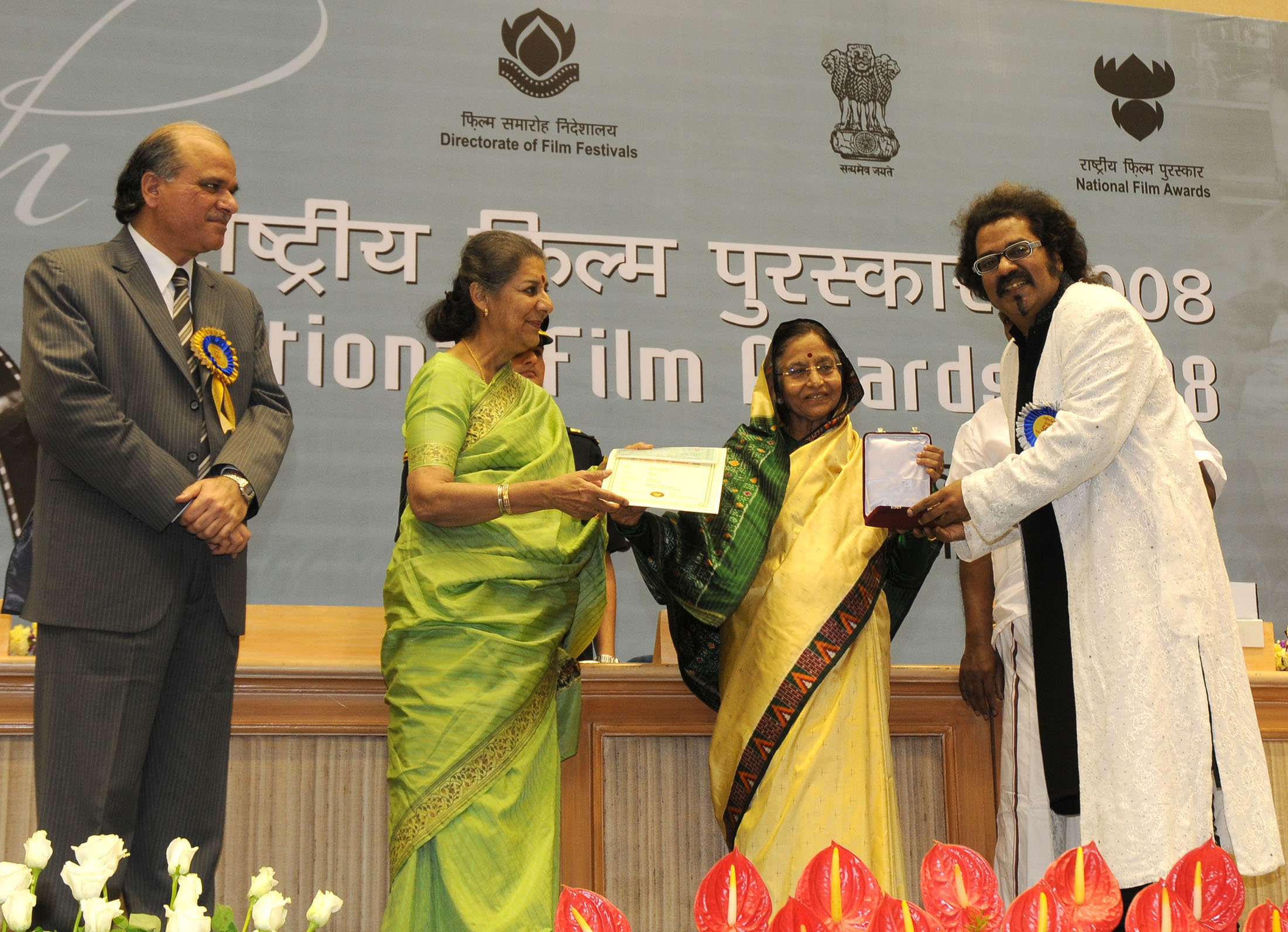
Hariharan receiving National Film Award for Best Male Playback Singer for Marathi film ‘Jogva’, 2010.

National Film Awards

- 1998 – National Film Award for Best Male Playback Singer: "Mere Dushman", Border
- 2009 – National Film Award for Best Male Playback Singer: "Jeev Dangla Gungla Rangla", Jogwa

Kerala State Film Awards

- 2011 – Kerala State Film Award for Best Singer – for the song "Pattu Paaduvaan" in the film Pattinte Palazhi music by Suresh Manimala

Swaralaya-Kairali-Yesudas Award

- 2004 – for his outstanding contribution to Indian film music

Tamil Nadu State Film Awards

- 2004 – Best Male Playback Singer – for various films
- 1995 – Best Male Playback Singer – for the song "Koncha Naal" in the film Aasai

Nandi Awards

- 1999 – Best Male Playback Singer – for the song "Hima Semalloyallo" in the film Annayya

Asianet Film Awards

- 2012 – Best Male Playback Singer – for Amrithamayi from Snehaveedu
- 2011 – Best Male Playback Singer – for "Aaro Padunnu" from Katha Thudarunnu

Kalakar Awards

- 8th Kalakar Awards 2000 – for Best Male Playback Singer

Filmfare Awards South

- 2011 – Best Male Playback Singer – for "Aaro Padunnu" from Katha Thudarunnu

Vijay Awards

- 2009 – Best Male Playback Singer – for "Nenjukkul Peithidum" from Vaaranam Aayiram
- 2021 - Lokmat Sur Jyotsna National Music Award 2021 for his contribution to Indian music

Channel V Music Awards

- 1997 - Album of the Year - for Colonial Cousins album.

== Television ==
Reality show as Judge

Year	Title	channel	language
2023	Sa Re Ga Ma Pa Seniors (Season 3)	Zee Tamil	Tamil
2019	Surya super singer	Surya TV	Malayalam
2017	Super Star junior 5	Amrita TV	Malayalam
2014	Saregamapa	Zee Bangla	Bengali
2011	Super Star 2	Amrita TV	Malayalam
2010–11	Hariyudan Naan	Jaya TV	Tamil

== Discography ==
- Aabshar-e-Ghazal
- Aathwan Sur – The Other Side of Naushad
- Colonial Cousins
- Dil Aisa Kisi Ne Mera Toda
- Dil Ki Baat
- Dil Nasheen
- Ghazal Ka Mausam
- Gulfam
- Halka Nasha
- Hariharan - Down the Years
- Hariharan in Concert
- Horizon
- Intoxicating Hariharan
- Jashn
- Kaash
- Kuch Door Hamare Saath
- Lafzz...
- Lahore Ke Rang Hari Ke Sang
- Magic Moments
- Paigham
- Qaraar
- Reflections
- Saptarishi
- Swar Utsav
- Sukoon
- The Great Ghazals
- The Very Best of Hariharan Ghazals
- Visaal – Ghazals for Connoisseurs
- Waqt Par Bolna

Albums by Colonial Cousins

- Colonial Cousins – MTV Unplugged
- Colonial Cousins – The Way We Do It
- Colonial Cousins – Aatma
- Modhi Vilayadu (soundtrack album)
- Chikku Bukku (soundtrack album)
- Colonial Cousins – Once More

== Featured albums ==
- Jana Gana Mana – by A. R. Rahman
- 1995 Meghutam – The Cloud Messenger (Pt. Vishwamohan Bhatt)
- 2000 Sartaj
- 2002 Tum Aaye
- 2004 Dhaani
- 2008 Tum Jo Mile
- 2009 Lajwaab – Tribute to Medi Hasan
- Asha Wali Dhoop
- Chand Ke Saath
- 2011 Hasrat
- 2011 Sarhadein: Music Beyond Boundaries
- 2014 JIL (Just In Love): Music By Dr. Kelvin Jeyakanth

== As actor ==
Hariharan has debuted as an actor in the Malayalam movie Dhaya Bharati released on 25 October 2024.

He also acted in a lead role in the movie below:

Name: Power of Women (2005), Language: Tamil
